= Labathude =

- Commune
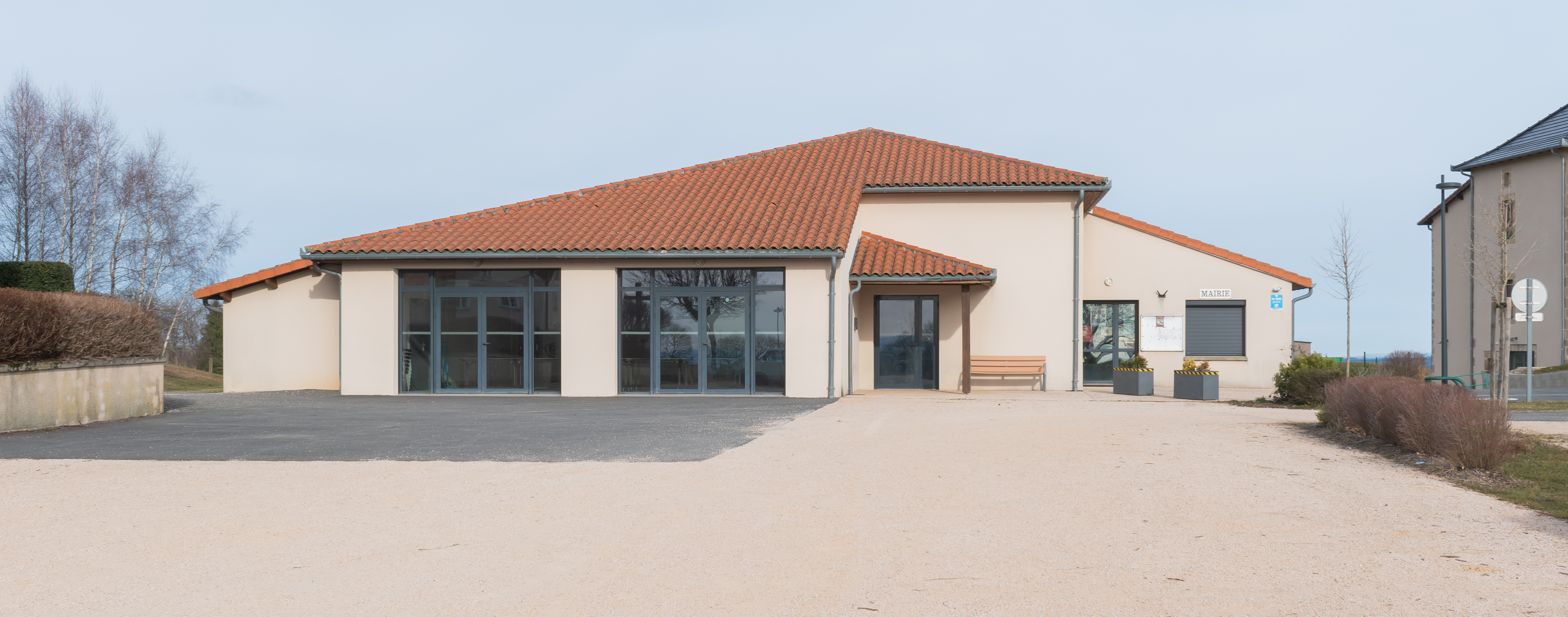
- Town hall of Labathude
- Location of Labathude
- Location within France Location within Occitanie
- Coordinates: 44°44′21″N 1°59′36″E
- Country: France
- Region: Occitania
- Department: Lot
- Arrondissement: Figeac
- Canton: Lacapelle-Marival
- Intercommunality: CC Grand-Figeac

Government
  - Mayor (2020–2026): Jacques Virole
- Area^{1}: 10.05 km^{2} (3.88 sq mi)
- Elevation: 613 m (2,011 ft)
- Highest elevation: 615 m (2,018 ft)
- Lowest elevation: 370 m (1,210 ft)
- Population (2023): 203
  - Density: 20.2/km^{2} (52.3/sq mi)
- Time zone: UTC+01:00 (CET)
  - Summer (DST): UTC+02:00 (CEST)
- INSEE/Postal code: 46139 /46120
- ^{1} French Land Register data, which excludes lakes, ponds, glaciers > 1 km^{2} (0.386 sq mi or 247 acres) and river estuaries.

Labathude (French pronunciation: [labatyd]; Occitan: Labatuda) is a commune in the Lot department in south-western France.

== Geography ==
Labthude is located in Quercy, in Ségala. Positioned at the beginning of Massif Central, Labathude is located between 310m (minimum) and 613m (maximum) above sea level.

== Location ==
Labathude is a commune located between Lacapelle-Marival and Latronquière. The biggest city next to Labathude is Figeac (at about 20 km).
