= Lac du Tolerme =

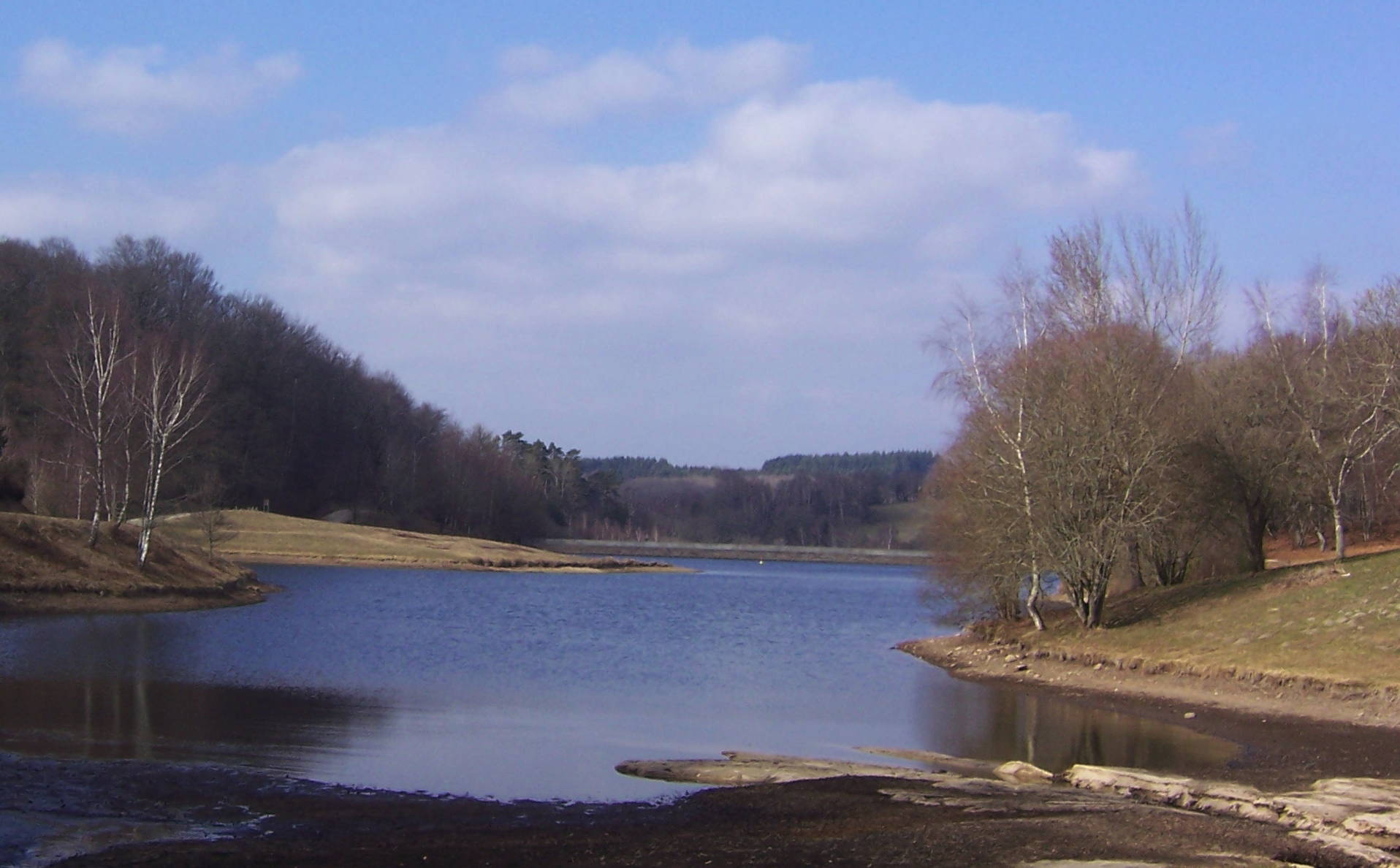

- Location within France
- Location: Lot
- Coordinates: 44°49′30″N 2°2′55″E
- Type: reservoir
- Primary outflows: Tolerme
- Catchment area: 24 km^{2} (9.3 sq mi)
- Basin countries: France
- Surface area: 0.38 km^{2} (0.15 sq mi)
- Max. depth: 20 m (66 ft)
- Surface elevation: 532 m (1,745 ft)

Lac du Tolerme is a lake in Lot, France. At an elevation of 532 m, its surface area is 0.38 km^{2}.

The Lac de Tolerme is located between the communes of Gorses and Sénaillac-Latronquière.
