= Rueyres =

Rueyres may refer to:

- Rueyres, Switzerland
- Rueyres-les-Prés, Switzerland
- Rueyres-Saint-Laurent, Switzerland
- Rueyres-Treyfayes, Switzerland
- Rueyres, Lot, a commune of the Lot department, southwestern France
