= Mialet =

Mialet is the name or part of the name of several communes in France:

- Mialet, in the Dordogne department
- Mialet, in the Gard department
- Mialet, former commune of the Lot department, now part of Saint-Bressou
