= Bretèche =

Type of castle architectural element

In medieval fortification, a bretèche or brattice is a small balcony with machicolations, usually built over a gate and sometimes in the corners of the fortress' wall, with the purpose of enabling defenders to shoot or throw objects at the attackers huddled under the wall. Depending on whether they have a roof, bretèches are classified in two types: open and closed. The open ones were accessed from the battlement's wall walk, or from a crenel.

Medieval latrines (called garderobes) were fairly similar in construction, but they were not placed over doors. In Catalan (lladronera) and Portuguese (ladroneira) the word for bretèche was in fact derived from the Byzantine latreys (latrine), but this regionalism did not carry over to other languages. Because the places protected by bretèches were usually vital, they were usually manned by professional soldiers, often mercenaries in the Middle Ages. As a result of these circumstances, the word for latrine even denoted a mercenary in some regions.

A bretèche is pictured in Bellifortis, Livro das Fortalezas, and in several other medieval military texts.

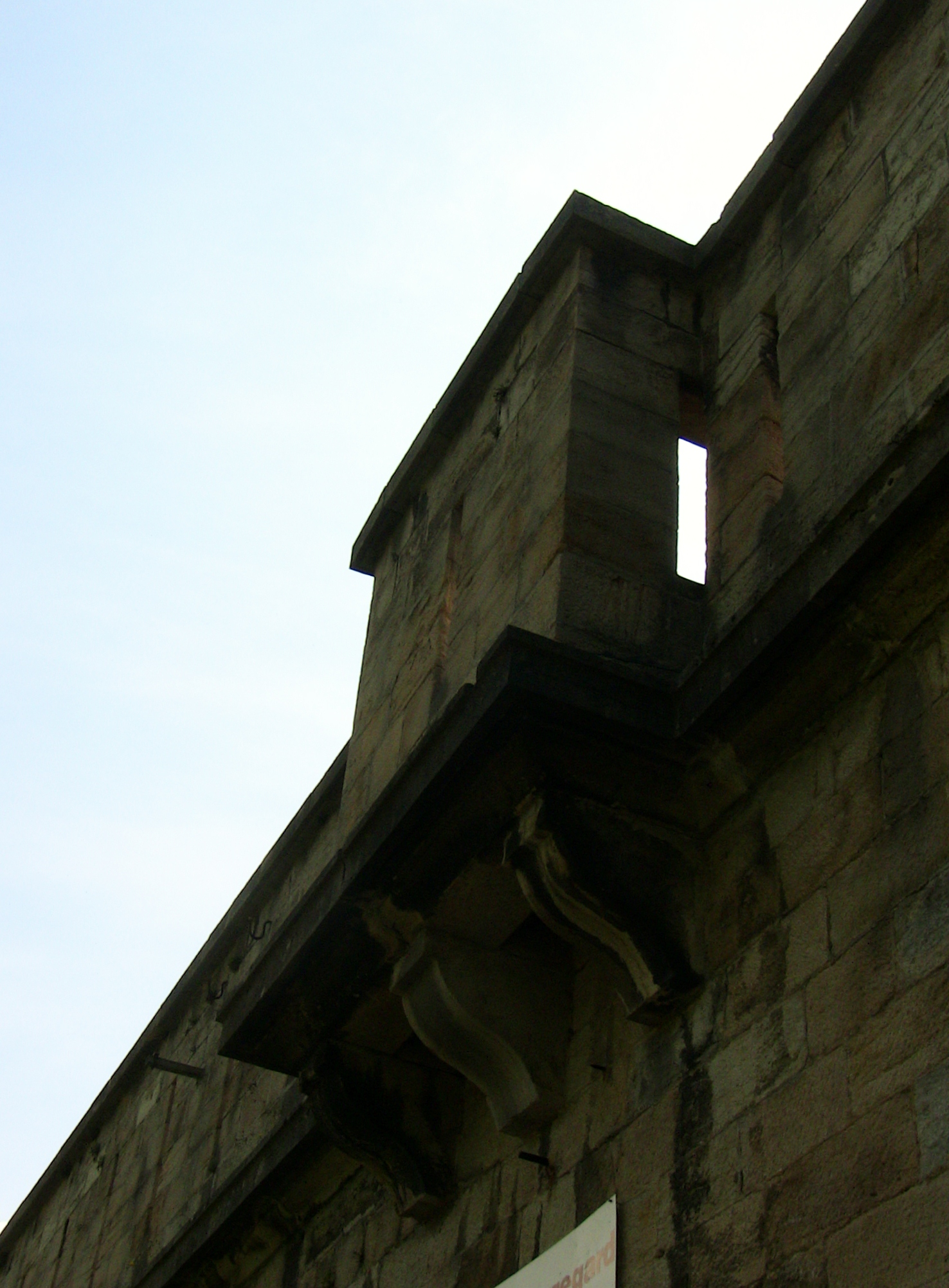
An open bretèche at the Fort of Beauregard, Besançon

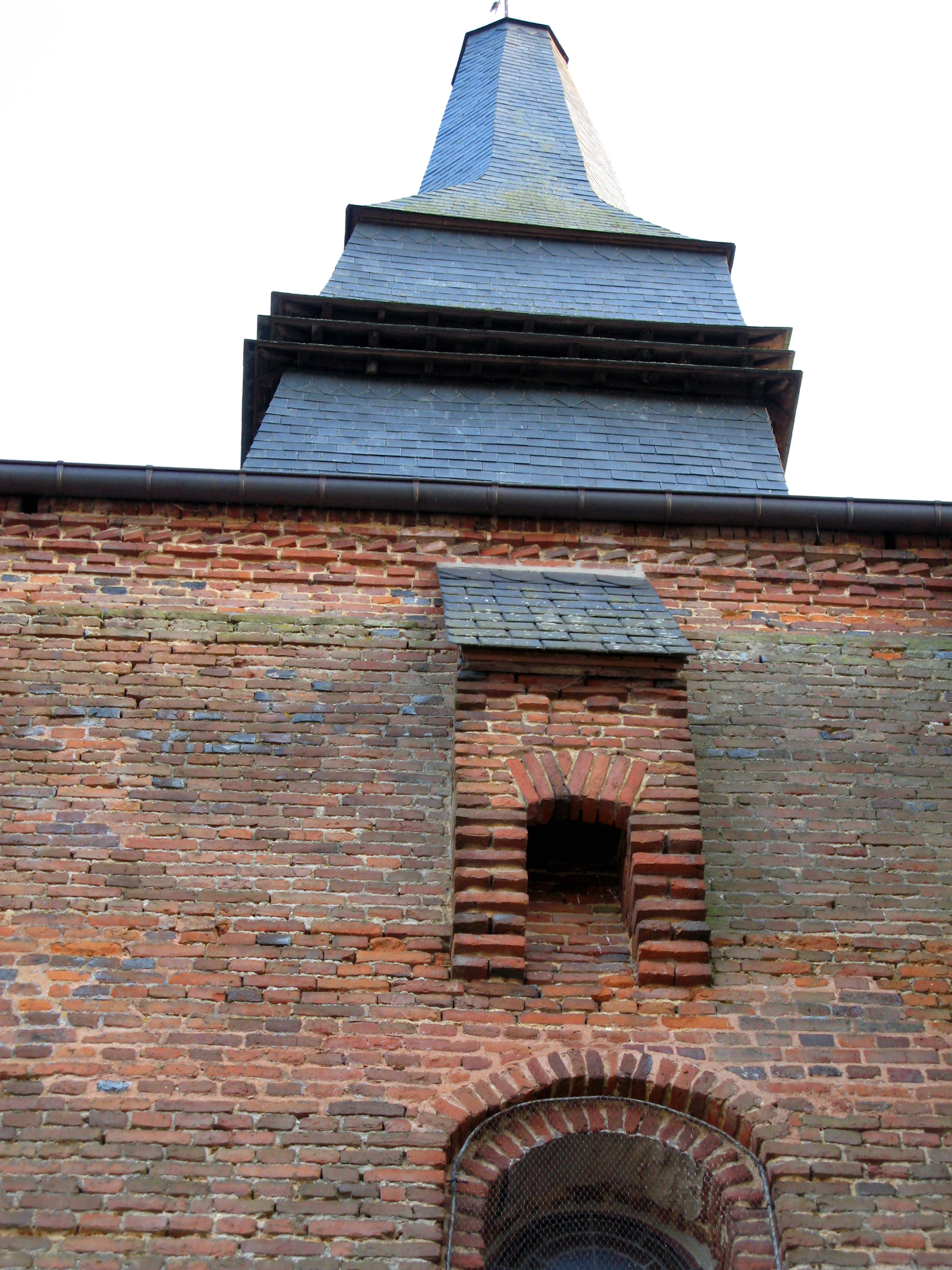
A closed bretèche of the fortified church at Archon, Aisne

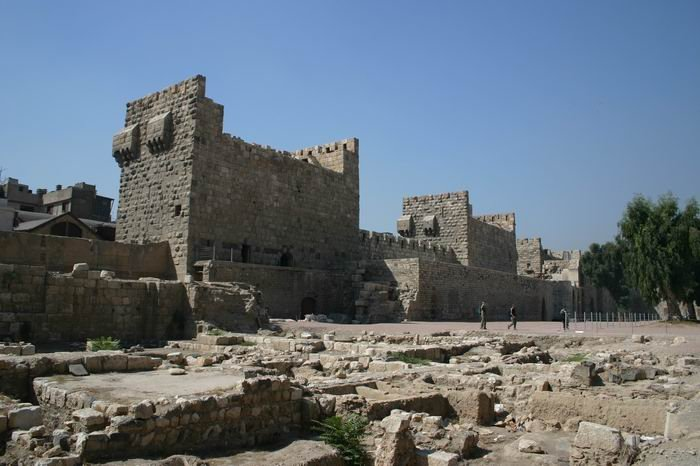
Inside view of the Citadel of Damascus; twin bretèches project from each tower overseeing a section of the curtain wall

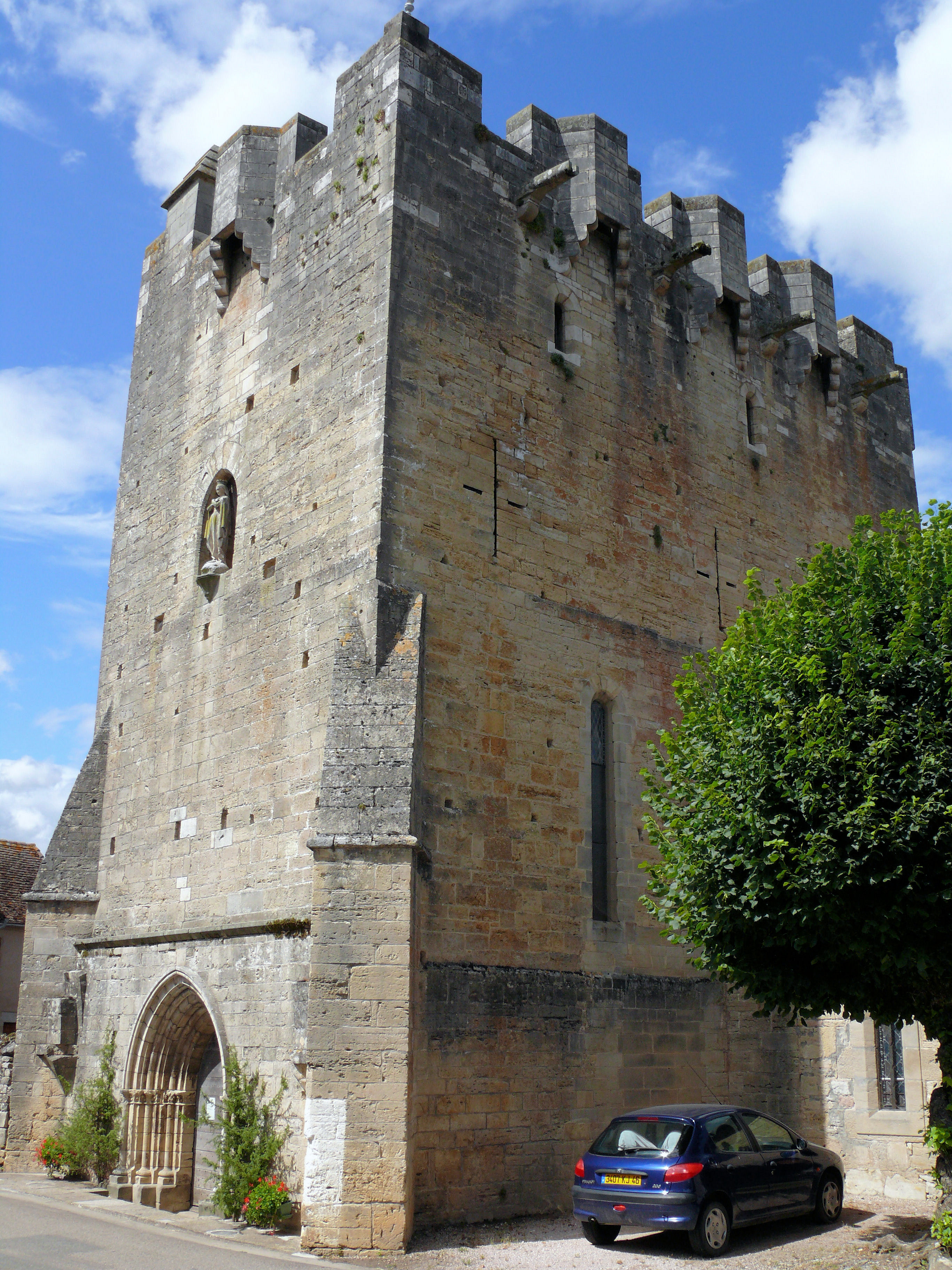
Bretèches protecting the door and windows of the fortified church at Rudelle, France

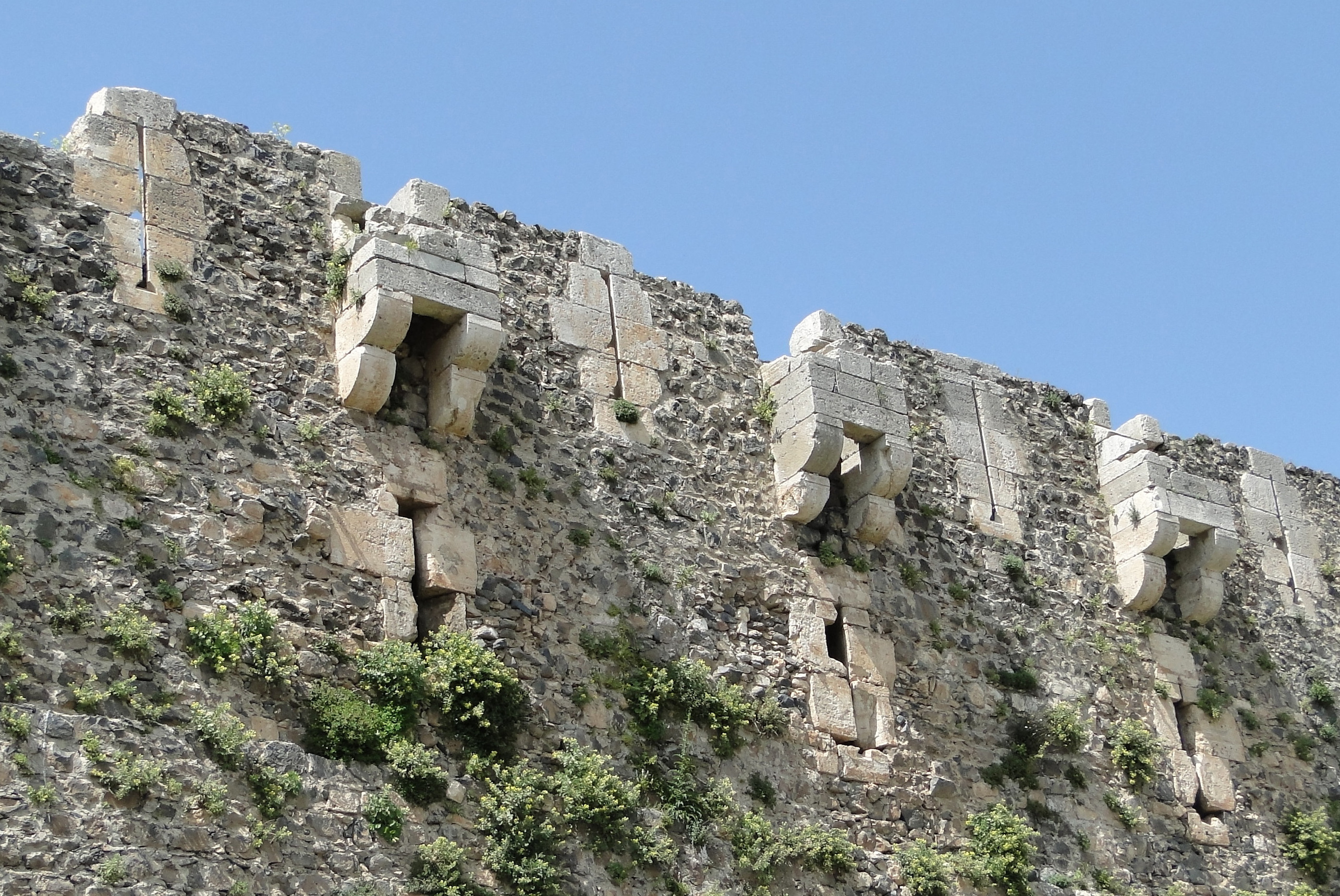
Three open bretèches at Krak des Chevaliers

== See also ==
- Bartizan
- Murder-hole
