= Arrondissement of Figeac =

Coordinates: 44°37′N 2°02′E

Figeac
- Arrondissement
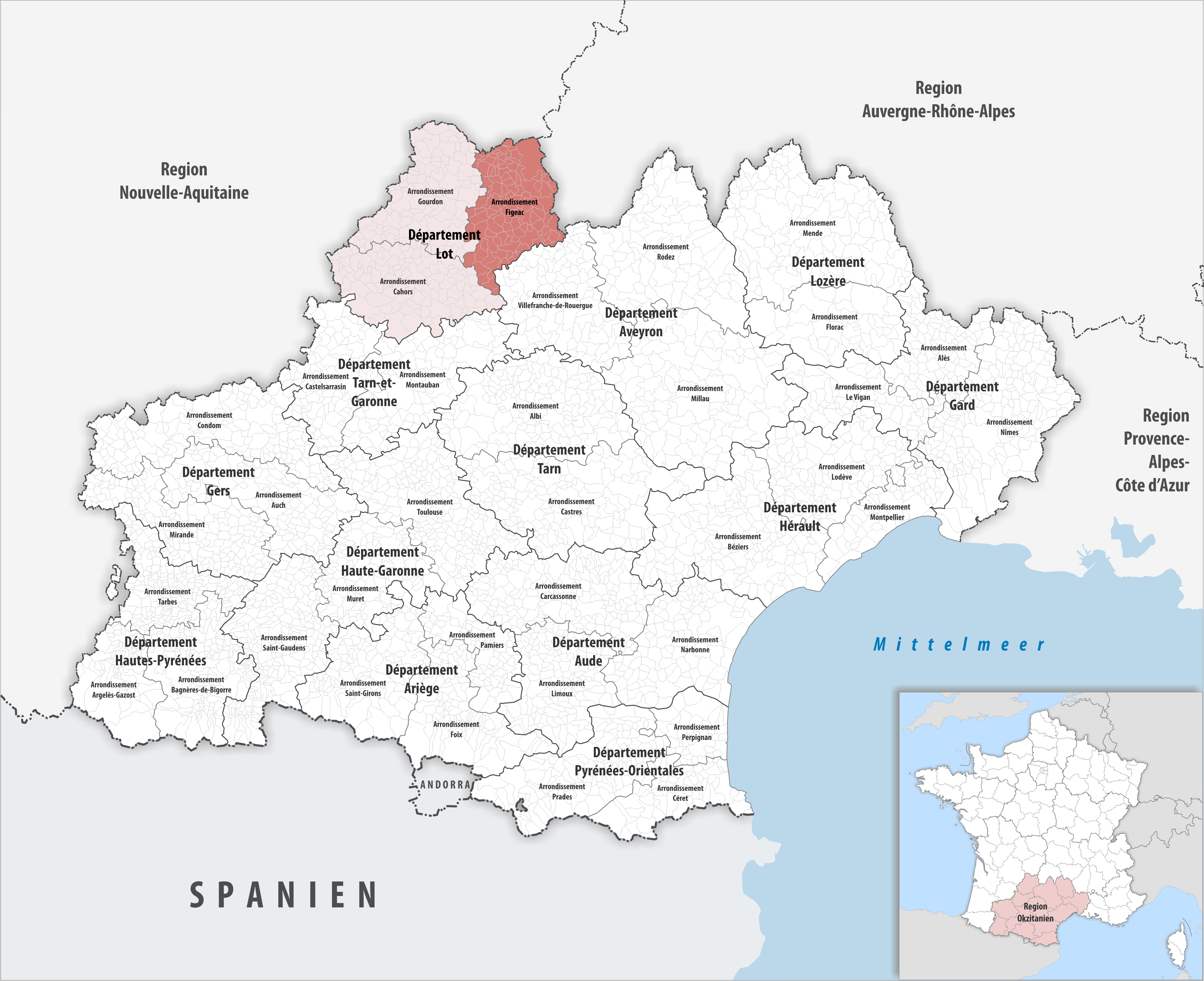
- Location within the region Occitanie
- Country: France
- Region: Occitania
- Department: Lot
- No. of communes: {{{nbcomm}}}
- Area: 1,593.3 km^{2} (615.2 sq mi)
- Population (2023): 55,076
  - Density: 34.567/km^{2} (89.529/sq mi)
- INSEE code: 462

The arrondissement of Figeac is an arrondissement of France in the Lot department in the Occitanie region. It has 118 communes. Its population is 54,750 (2021), and its area is 1,593.3 km^{2} (615.2 sq mi).

== Composition ==
The communes of the arrondissement of Figeac, and their INSEE codes, are:

1. Albiac (46002)
2. Anglars (46004)
3. Assier (46009)
4. Autoire (46011)
5. Aynac (46012)
6. Bagnac-sur-Célé (46015)
7. Bannes (46017)
8. Béduer (46021)
9. Belmont-Bretenoux (46024)
10. Bessonies (46338)
11. Biars-sur-Cère (46029)
12. Le Bourg (46034)
13. Boussac (46035)
14. Le Bouyssou (46036)
15. Brengues (46039)
16. Bretenoux (46038)
17. Cadrieu (46041)
18. Cahus (46043)
19. Cajarc (46045)
20. Calvignac (46049)
21. Cambes (46051)
22. Camboulit (46052)
23. Camburat (46053)
24. Capdenac (46055)
25. Carayac (46056)
26. Cardaillac (46057)
27. Corn (46075)
28. Cornac (46076)
29. Cuzac (46085)
30. Durbans (46090)
31. Espagnac-Sainte-Eulalie (46093)
32. Espédaillac (46094)
33. Espeyroux (46096)
34. Estal (46097)
35. Faycelles (46100)
36. Felzins (46101)
37. Figeac (46102)
38. Flaujac-Gare (46104)
39. Fons (46108)
40. Fourmagnac (46111)
41. Frayssinhes (46115)
42. Frontenac (46116)
43. Gagnac-sur-Cère (46117)
44. Gintrac (46122)
45. Girac (46123)
46. Glanes (46124)
47. Gorses (46125)
48. Gréalou (46129)
49. Grèzes (46131)
50. Issendolus (46132)
51. Issepts (46133)
52. Labastide-du-Haut-Mont (46135)
53. Labathude (46139)
54. Lacapelle-Marival (46143)
55. Ladirat (46146)
56. Larnagol (46155)
57. Larroque-Toirac (46157)
58. Latouille-Lentillac (46159)
59. Latronquière (46160)
60. Lauresses (46161)
61. Laval-de-Cère (46163)
62. Lentillac-Saint-Blaise (46168)
63. Leyme (46170)
64. Linac (46174)
65. Lissac-et-Mouret (46175)
66. Livernon (46176)
67. Loubressac (46177)
68. Lunan (46180)
69. Marcilhac-sur-Célé (46183)
70. Mayrinhac-Lentour (46189)
71. Molières (46195)
72. Montbrun (46198)
73. Montet-et-Bouxal (46203)
74. Montredon (46207)
75. Planioles (46221)
76. Prendeignes (46226)
77. Prudhomat (46228)
78. Puybrun (46229)
79. Puyjourdes (46230)
80. Quissac (46233)
81. Reilhac (46235)
82. Reyrevignes (46237)
83. Rudelle (46242)
84. Rueyres (46243)
85. Sabadel-Latronquière (46244)
86. Saignes (46246)
87. Saint-Bressou (46249)
88. Saint-Céré (46251)
89. Saint-Chels (46254)
90. Saint-Cirgues (46255)
91. Sainte-Colombe (46260)
92. Saint-Félix (46266)
93. Saint-Hilaire (46269)
94. Saint-Jean-de-Laur (46270)
95. Saint-Jean-Lagineste (46339)
96. Saint-Jean-Lespinasse (46271)
97. Saint-Jean-Mirabel (46272)
98. Saint-Laurent-les-Tours (46273)
99. Saint-Maurice-en-Quercy (46279)
100. Saint-Médard-de-Presque (46281)
101. Saint-Médard-Nicourby (46282)
102. Saint-Michel-Loubéjou (46284)
103. Saint-Paul-de-Vern (46286)
104. Saint-Perdoux (46288)
105. Saint-Pierre-Toirac (46289)
106. Saint-Simon (46292)
107. Saint-Sulpice (46294)
108. Saint-Vincent-du-Pendit (46295)
109. Sauliac-sur-Célé (46299)
110. Sénaillac-Latronquière (46302)
111. Sonac (46306)
112. Sousceyrac-en-Quercy (46311)
113. Tauriac (46313)
114. Terrou (46314)
115. Teyssieu (46315)
116. Thémines (46318)
117. Théminettes (46319)
118. Viazac (46332)

== History ==
The arrondissement of Figeac was created in 1800. At the January 2017 reorganisation of the arrondissements of Lot, it gained two communes from the arrondissement of Cahors.

As a result of the reorganisation of the cantons of France which came into effect in 2015, the borders of the cantons are no longer related to the borders of the arrondissements. The cantons of the arrondissement of Figeac were, as of January 2015:

1. Bretenoux
2. Cajarc
3. Figeac-Est
4. Figeac-Ouest
5. Lacapelle-Marival
6. Latronquière
7. Livernon
8. Saint-Céré
9. Sousceyrac
