= Thémines =

- Commune
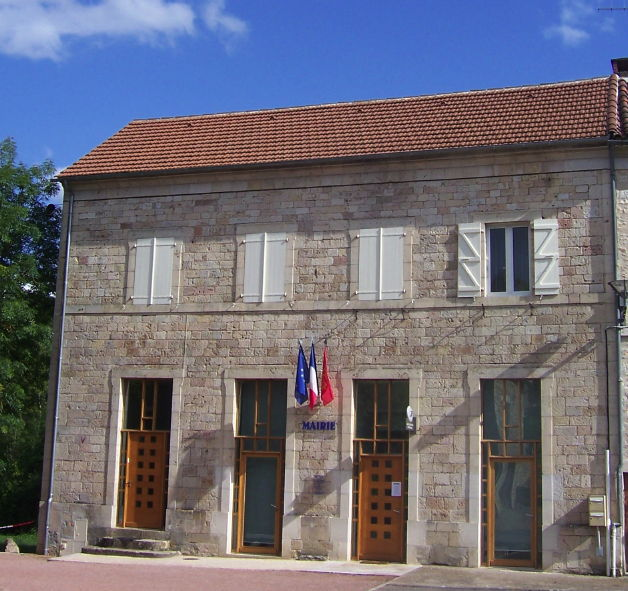
- The town hall in Thémines
- Location of Thémines
- Location within France Location within Occitanie
- Coordinates: 44°44′26″N 1°49′45″E
- Country: France
- Region: Occitania
- Department: Lot
- Arrondissement: Figeac
- Canton: Lacapelle-Marival
- Intercommunality: CC Grand-Figeac

Government
  - Mayor (2020–2026): Catherine Prunet
- Area^{1}: 13.35 km^{2} (5.15 sq mi)
- Elevation: 327 m (1,073 ft)
- Highest elevation: 423 m (1,388 ft)
- Lowest elevation: 306 m (1,004 ft)
- Population (2023): 240
  - Density: 18/km^{2} (47/sq mi)
- Time zone: UTC+01:00 (CET)
  - Summer (DST): UTC+02:00 (CEST)
- INSEE/Postal code: 46318 /46120
- ^{1} French Land Register data, which excludes lakes, ponds, glaciers > 1 km^{2} (0.386 sq mi or 247 acres) and river estuaries.

Thémines (French pronunciation: [temin]; Occitan: Teminas) is a commune in the Lot department in south-western France. It is located to the south-west of Rueyres, on the road between Figeac and Gramat.

== See also ==
- Communes of the Lot department
