= Château de Lacapelle-Marival =

Castle in France

Coordinates: 44°23′47″N 1°55′36″E

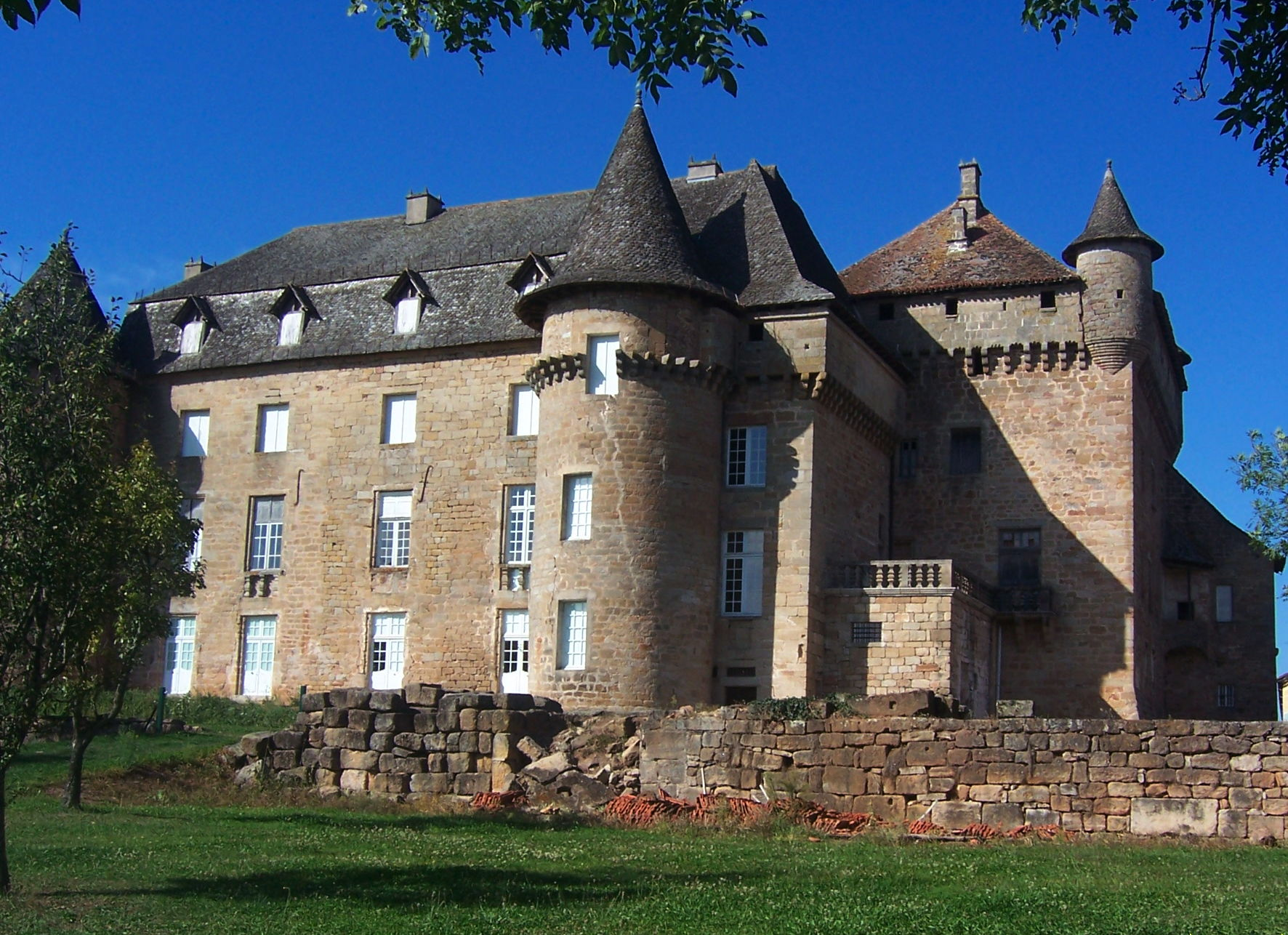
South facade of Château de Lacapelle-Marival

The Château de Lacapelle-Marival is a castle in the commune of Lacapelle-Marival in the Lot département of France.

The castle dates originally from the 12th century, with further building and alterations in the 15th and 16th centuries.

The building is owned by the commune and used as offices. It is open to the public. It has been listed since 1939 as a monument historique by the French Ministry of Culture.

== See also ==
- List of castles in France
