= Bessonies =

- Commune
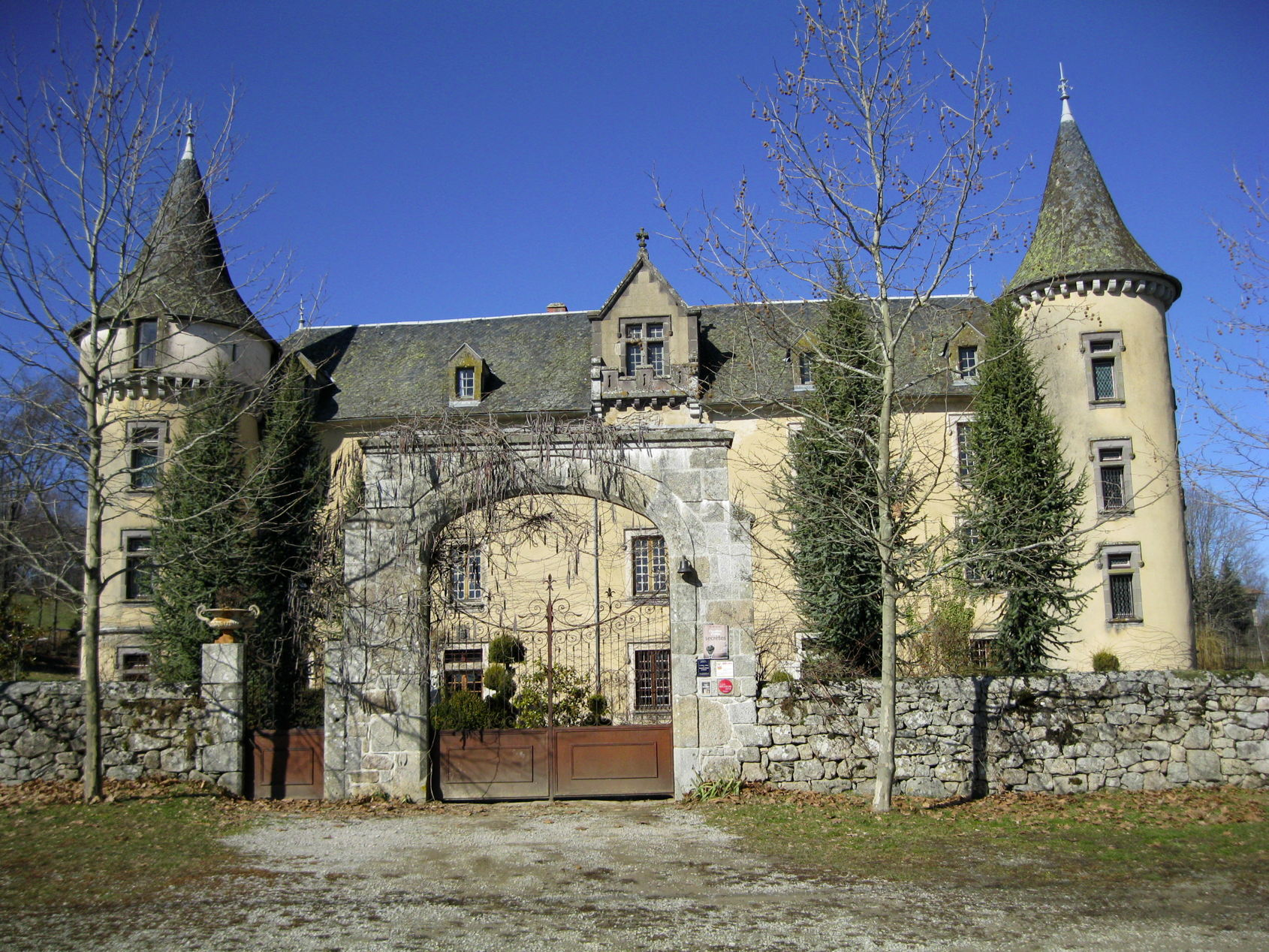
- The entrance to the chateau in Bessonies
- Location of Bessonies
- Location within France Location within Occitanie
- Coordinates: 44°48′40″N 2°09′05″E
- Country: France
- Region: Occitania
- Department: Lot
- Arrondissement: Figeac
- Canton: Lacapelle-Marival

Government
  - Mayor (2020–2026): Francis Thers
- Area^{1}: 7.41 km^{2} (2.86 sq mi)
- Elevation: 520 m (1,710 ft)
- Highest elevation: 682 m (2,238 ft)
- Lowest elevation: 510 m (1,670 ft)
- Population (2023): 72
  - Density: 9.7/km^{2} (25/sq mi)
- Time zone: UTC+01:00 (CET)
  - Summer (DST): UTC+02:00 (CEST)
- INSEE/Postal code: 46338 /46210
- ^{1} French Land Register data, which excludes lakes, ponds, glaciers > 1 km^{2} (0.386 sq mi or 247 acres) and river estuaries.

Bessonies (French pronunciation: [bɛsɔni]; Occitan: Bessoniás) is a commune in the Lot department in southwestern France.

The commune was created in 1947 by detaching a territory from Saint-Hilaire.

== Population ==
Historical population
Year	Pop.	±% p.a.
1968	184	—
1975	169	−1.21%
1982	143	−2.36%
1990	124	−1.77%
1999	120	−0.36%
2007	106	−1.54%
2012	100	−1.16%
2017	81	−4.13%
2023	72	−1.94%
Source: INSEE

== See also ==
- Communes of the Lot department
