= Larroque-Toirac =

- Commune
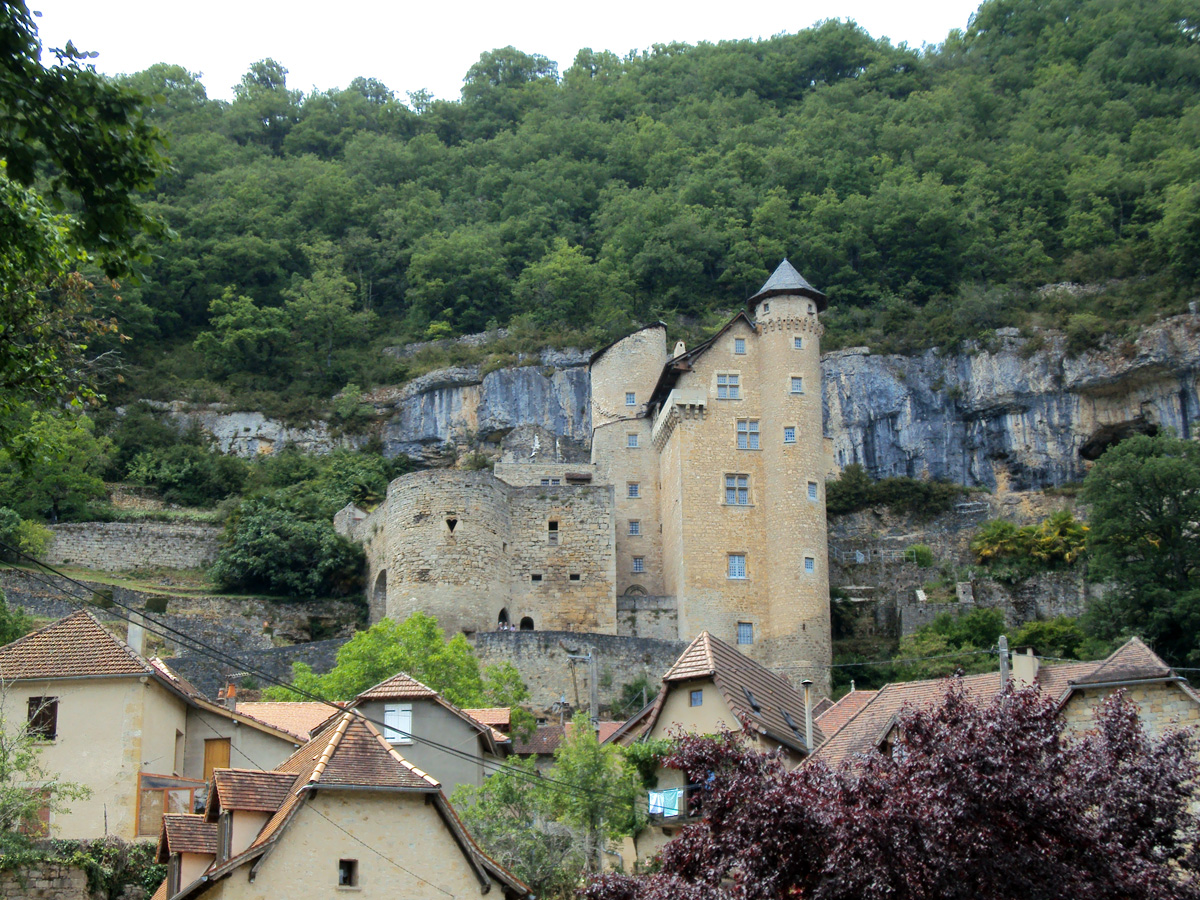
- The château in Larroque-Toirac
- Location of Larroque-Toirac
- Location within France Location within Occitanie
- Coordinates: 44°31′16″N 1°56′31″E
- Country: France
- Region: Occitania
- Department: Lot
- Arrondissement: Figeac
- Canton: Causse et Vallées

Government
  - Mayor (2020–2026): Fabrice Pradines
- Area^{1}: 6.56 km^{2} (2.53 sq mi)
- Elevation: 160 m (520 ft)
- Population (2023): 126
  - Density: 19.2/km^{2} (49.7/sq mi)
- Time zone: UTC+01:00 (CET)
  - Summer (DST): UTC+02:00 (CEST)
- INSEE/Postal code: 46157 /46160
- ^{1} French Land Register data, which excludes lakes, ponds, glaciers > 1 km^{2} (0.386 sq mi or 247 acres) and river estuaries.

Larroque-Toirac (French pronunciation: [laʁɔk twaʁak]; Languedocien: La Ròca de Toirac) is a commune in the Lot department in south-western France.

Overlooked by a medieval castle, the village lies halfway between Figeac and Cajarc in the valley of the Lot.

The castle (Château de Larroque-Toirac) was built in the 12th century and improved over the following 300 years. It is now a popular tourist attraction.

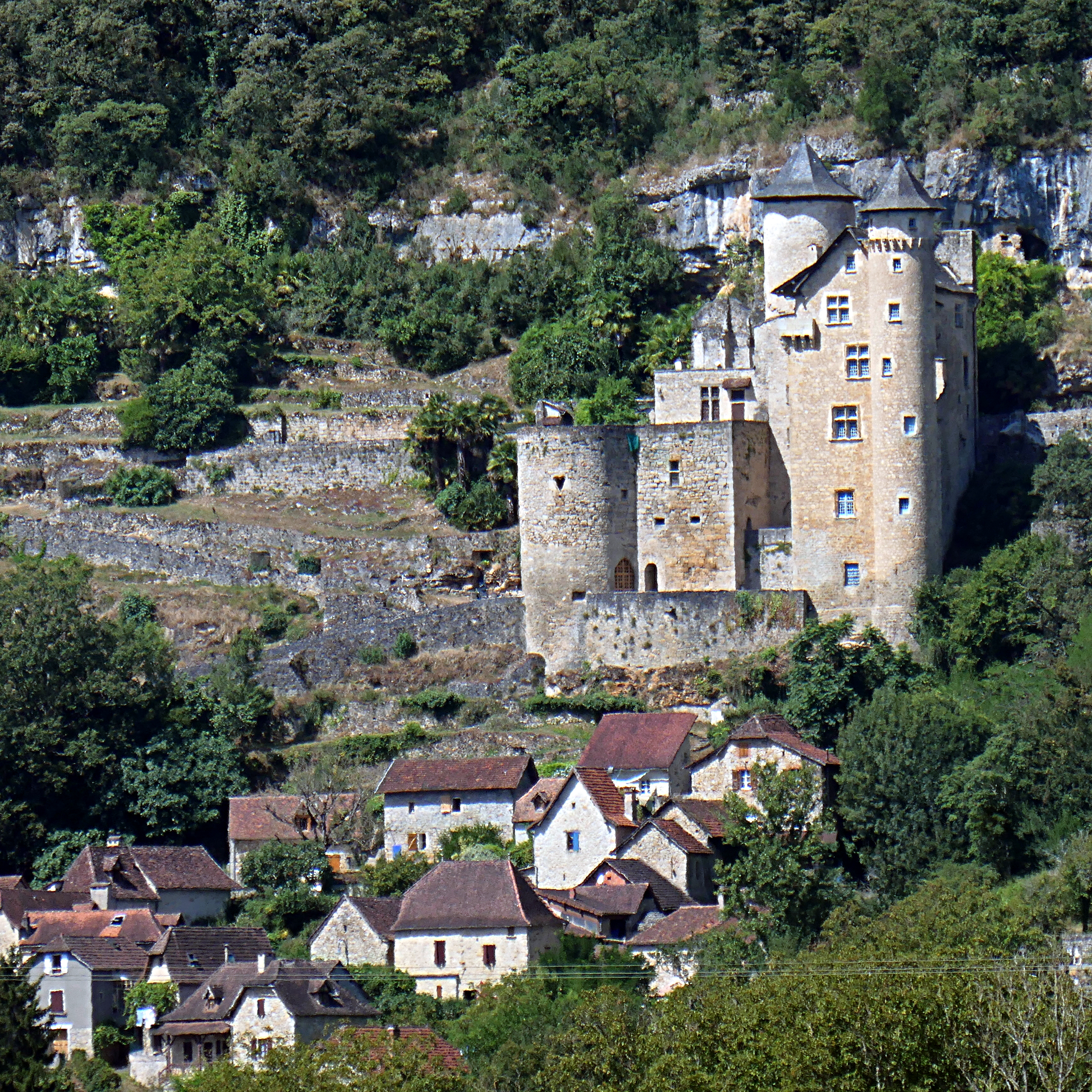
Castle of Larroque-Toirac (12th-15th century)

== See also ==
- Communes of the Lot department
