= Sabadel-Latronquière =

- Commune
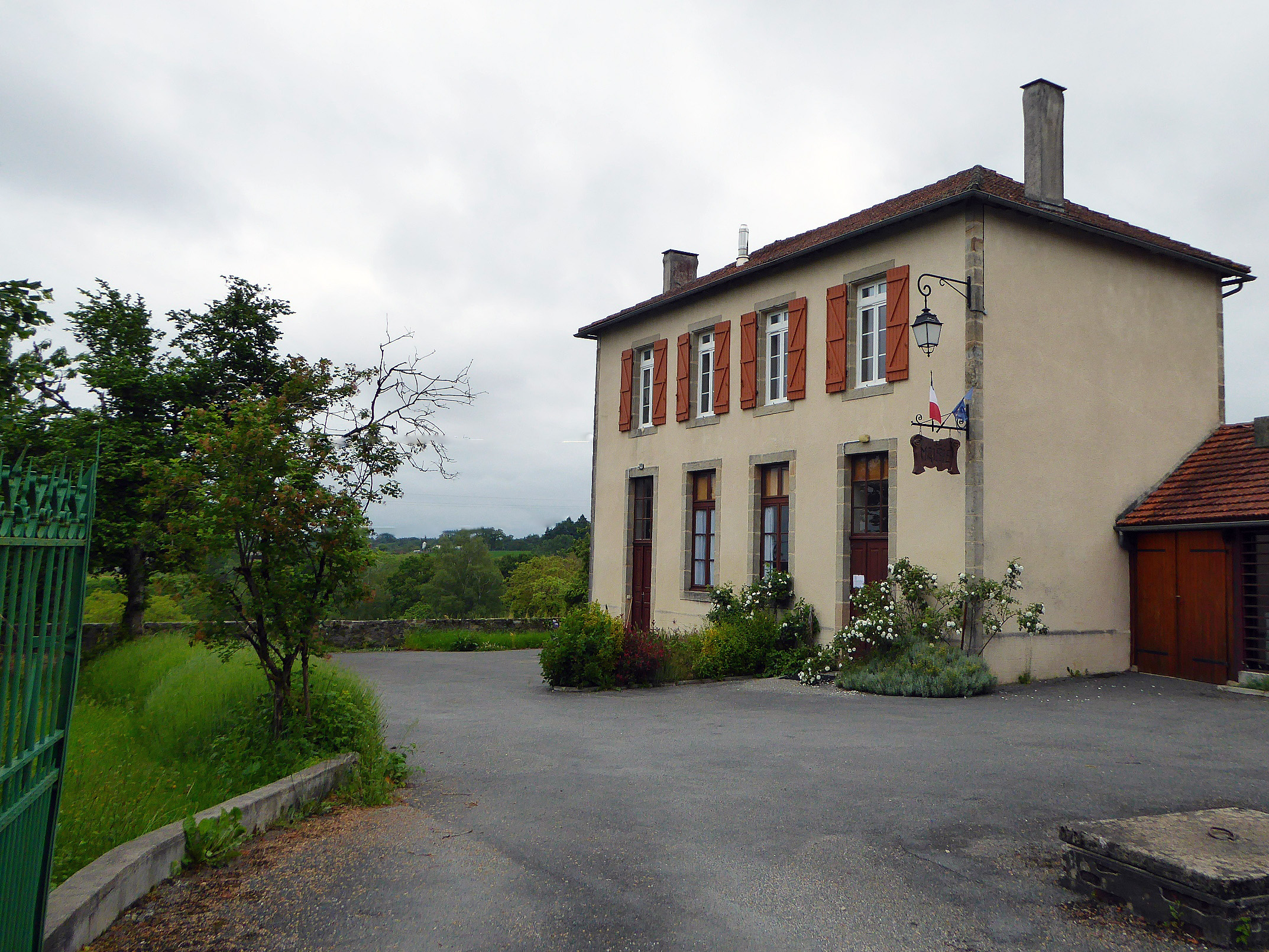
- Town hall
- Location of Sabadel-Latronquière
- Location within France Location within Occitanie
- Coordinates: 44°44′11″N 2°03′41″E
- Country: France
- Region: Occitania
- Department: Lot
- Arrondissement: Figeac
- Canton: Lacapelle-Marival
- Intercommunality: Grand-Figeac

Government
  - Mayor (2020–2026): Jean Laporte
- Area^{1}: 12.29 km^{2} (4.75 sq mi)
- Elevation: 575 m (1,886 ft)
- Highest elevation: 633 m (2,077 ft)
- Lowest elevation: 329 m (1,079 ft)
- Population (2023): 92
  - Density: 7.5/km^{2} (19/sq mi)
- Time zone: UTC+01:00 (CET)
  - Summer (DST): UTC+02:00 (CEST)
- INSEE/Postal code: 46244 /46210
- ^{1} French Land Register data, which excludes lakes, ponds, glaciers > 1 km^{2} (0.386 sq mi or 247 acres) and river estuaries.

Sabadel-Latronquière (French pronunciation: [sabadɛl latʁɔ̃kjɛʁ]; Occitan: Sabadèl de la Tronquièra) is a commune in the Lot department in south-western France. In the village centre there is a church dedicated to St Martial, a library (bibliothèque municipale) and a village hall (maison des associations).

== Population ==
Historical population
Year	Pop.	±% p.a.
1968	181	—
1975	156	−2.10%
1982	140	−1.53%
1990	112	−2.75%
1999	89	−2.52%
2007	98	+1.21%
2012	84	−3.04%
2017	96	+2.71%
2023	92	−0.71%
Source: INSEE

== See also ==
- Communes of the Lot department
