= Labastide-du-Haut-Mont =

Labastide-du-Haut-Mont La Bastida (Occitan)
- Commune
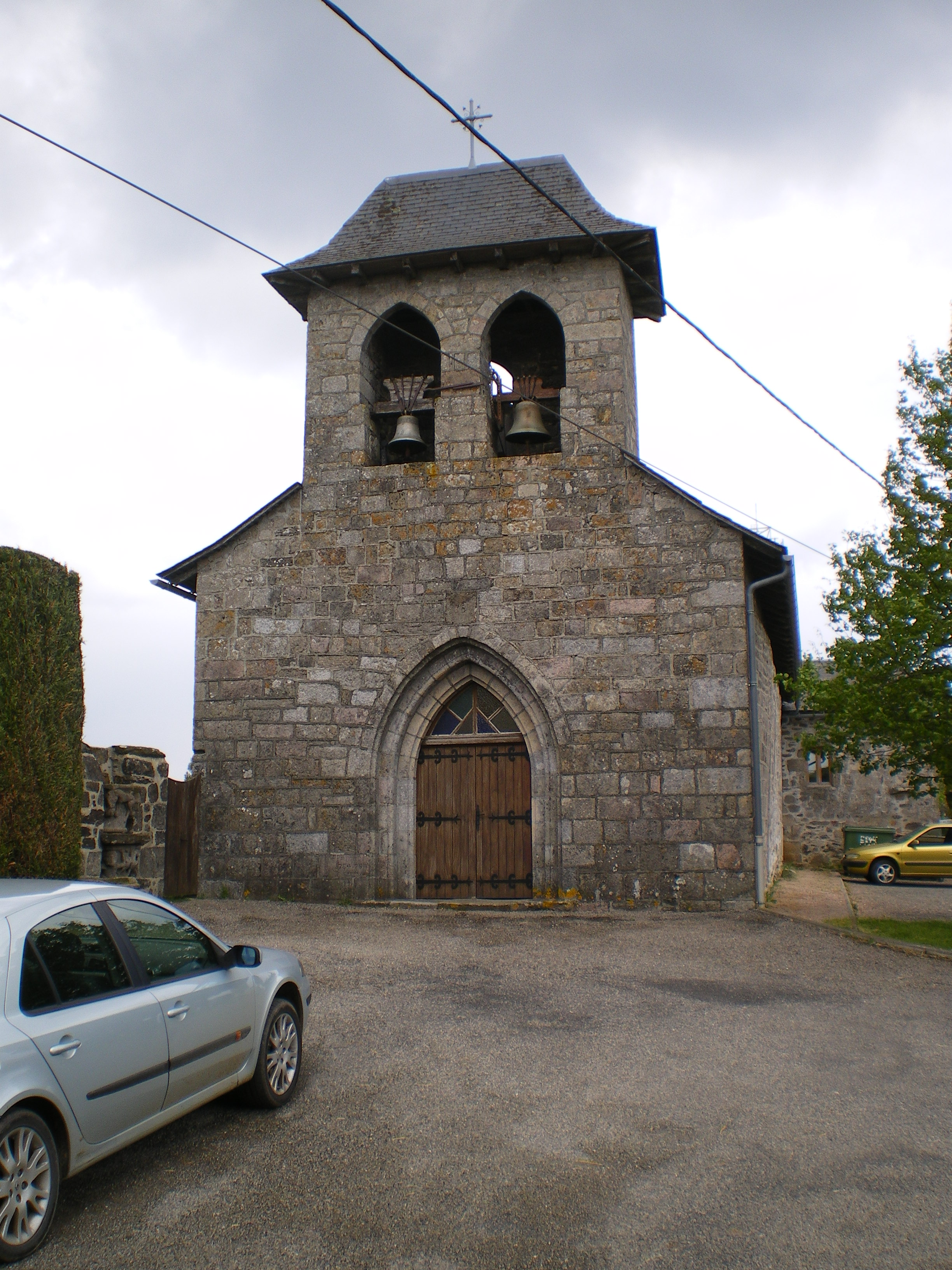
- Église de l'Assomption-de-la-Vierge
- Location of Labastide-du-Haut-Mont
- Location within France Location within Occitanie
- Coordinates: 44°50′08″N 2°07′18″E
- Country: France
- Region: Occitania
- Department: Lot
- Arrondissement: Figeac
- Canton: Lacapelle-Marival

Government
  - Mayor (2020–2026): Sandrine Gavoille
- Area^{1}: 9.85 km^{2} (3.80 sq mi)
- Elevation: 784 m (2,572 ft)
- Highest elevation: 776 m (2,546 ft)
- Lowest elevation: 577 m (1,893 ft)
- Population (2023): 44
  - Density: 4.5/km^{2} (12/sq mi)
- Time zone: UTC+01:00 (CET)
  - Summer (DST): UTC+02:00 (CEST)
- INSEE/Postal code: 46135 /46210
- ^{1} French Land Register data, which excludes lakes, ponds, glaciers > 1 km^{2} (0.386 sq mi or 247 acres) and river estuaries.

Labastide-du-Haut-Mont (French pronunciation: [labastid dy o mɔ̃]; Occitan: La Bastida) is a rural commune in the Lot department in the Occitania region in Southwestern France. It is located on the departmental border with Cantal, which is also the regional border with Auvergne-Rhône-Alpes. As of 2023, the population of the commune was 44.

== See also ==
- Communes of the Lot department
