= Cardaillac =

- Commune
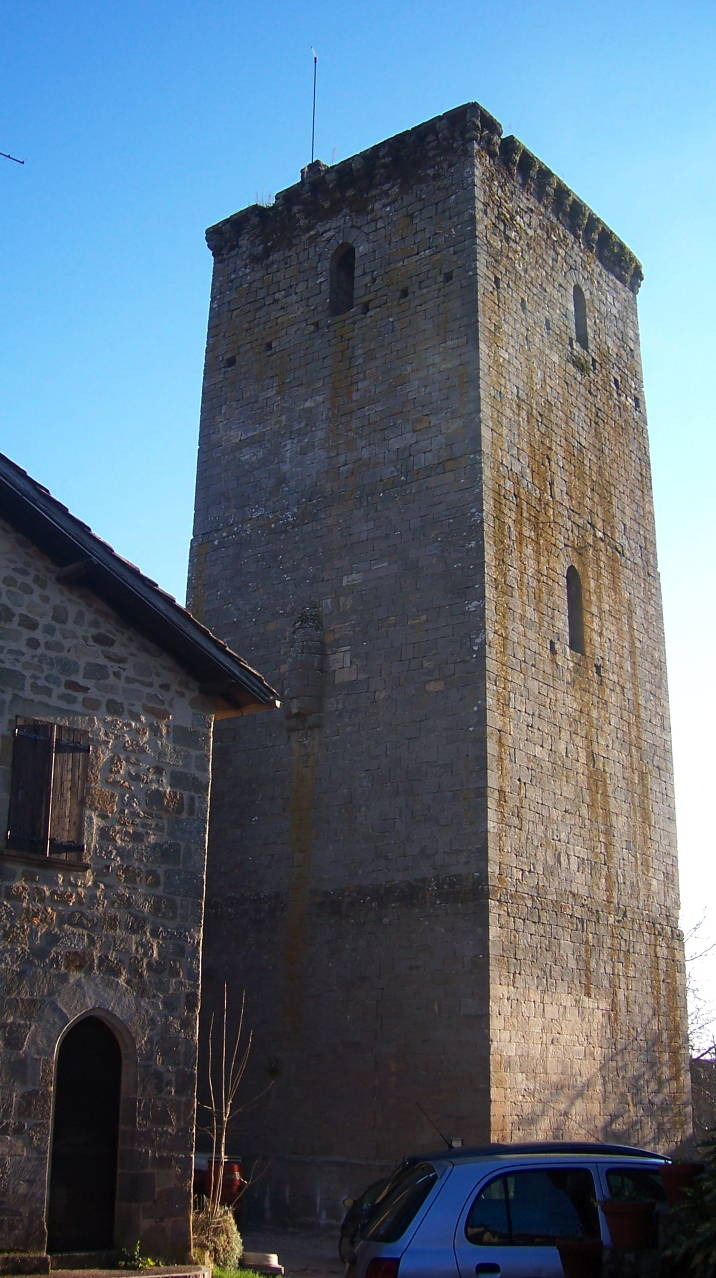
- Tour Sagnes
- Location of Cardaillac
- Location within France Location within Occitanie
- Coordinates: 44°40′51″N 1°59′52″E
- Country: France
- Region: Occitania
- Department: Lot
- Arrondissement: Figeac
- Canton: Lacapelle-Marival

Government
  - Mayor (2020–2026): Sophie Picard
- Area^{1}: 18.1 km^{2} (7.0 sq mi)
- Elevation: 375 m (1,230 ft)
- Highest elevation: 575 m (1,886 ft)
- Lowest elevation: 226 m (741 ft)
- Population (2023): 623
  - Density: 34.4/km^{2} (89.1/sq mi)
- Time zone: UTC+01:00 (CET)
  - Summer (DST): UTC+02:00 (CEST)
- INSEE/Postal code: 46057 /46100
- ^{1} French Land Register data, which excludes lakes, ponds, glaciers > 1 km^{2} (0.386 sq mi or 247 acres) and river estuaries.

Cardaillac (French pronunciation: [kaʁdajak]; Occitan: Cardalhac) is a commune in the Lot department in south-western France.

It is located 9 km (5.6 mi) northwest of Figeac.

The village is located on the edge of the Limargue—a rich agricultural region—and Ségala, a poor rye-and chestnut-producing region. It has a rich medieval history and is a member of Les Plus Beaux Villages de France (The Most Beautiful Villages of France) Association.

A stronghold was built on a rocky promontory above Cardaillac from 1064 at the orders of Hugo, Lord of Cardaillac. Today only three towers remain, dating from the thirteenth century. In 1188 it was attacked by Richard the Lionheart soon before his accession to the throne.

On 11 May 1944, three youths were executed by the "Das Reich" division, which subsequently massacred the population of Oradour-sur-Glane.

== Bibliography ==
- Des blasons pour le Hérisson Laure and Jean-Luc Angélis, Téqui éditions, ISBN 2-7403-0638-5.

== See also ==
- Communes of the Lot department
