= Saint-Simon, Lot =

Saint-Simon
- Commune
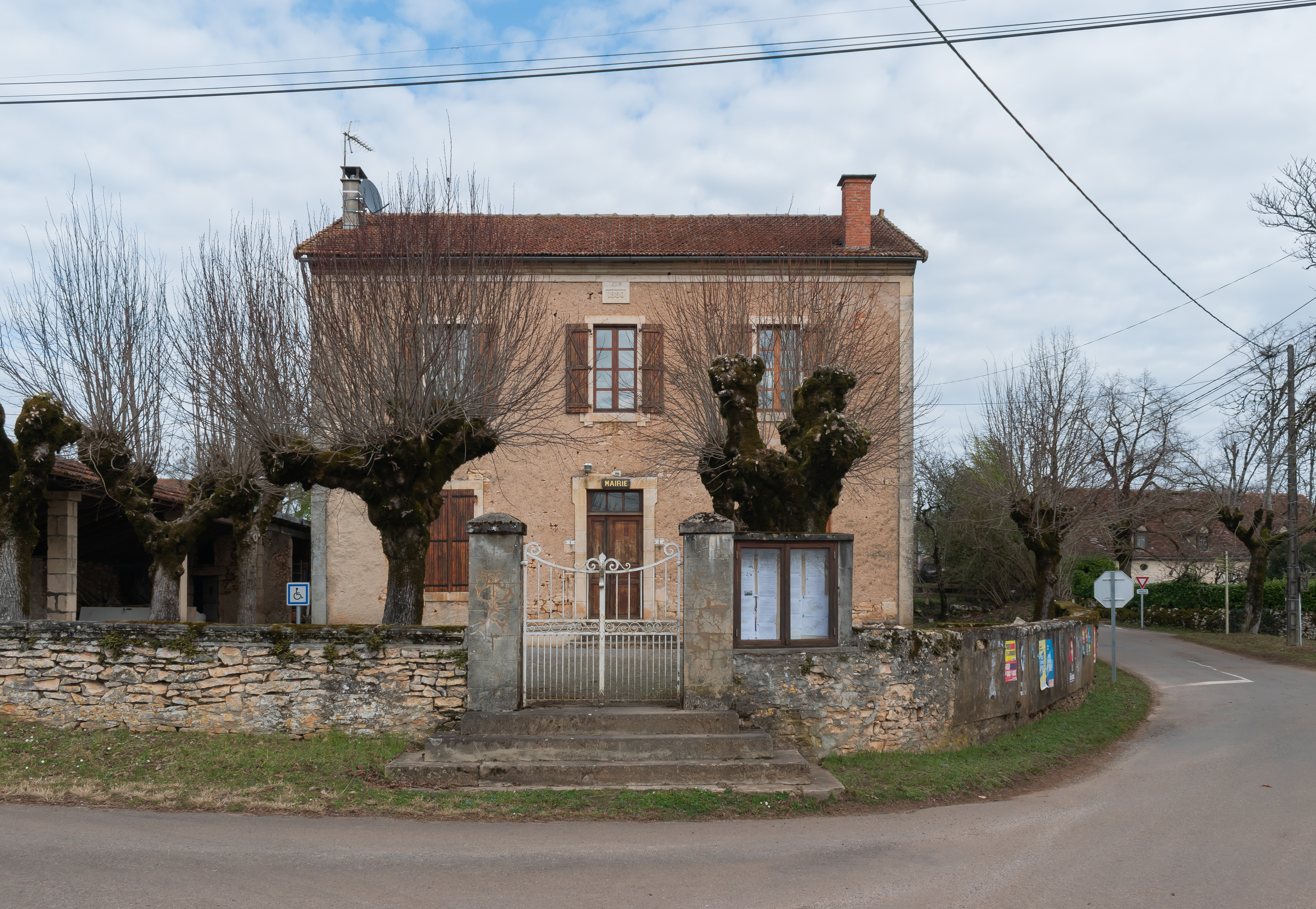
- Town hall of Saint-Simon, Lot
- Location of Saint-Simon
- Location within France Location within Occitanie
- Coordinates: 44°41′57″N 1°50′45″E
- Country: France
- Region: Occitania
- Department: Lot
- Arrondissement: Figeac
- Canton: Lacapelle-Marival

Government
  - Mayor (2020–2026): Patrick Calmon
- Area^{1}: 9.26 km^{2} (3.58 sq mi)
- Elevation: 340 m (1,120 ft)
- Highest elevation: 392 m (1,286 ft)
- Lowest elevation: 309 m (1,014 ft)
- Population (2023): 195
  - Density: 21.1/km^{2} (54.5/sq mi)
- Time zone: UTC+01:00 (CET)
  - Summer (DST): UTC+02:00 (CEST)
- INSEE/Postal code: 46292 /46320
- ^{1} French Land Register data, which excludes lakes, ponds, glaciers > 1 km^{2} (0.386 sq mi or 247 acres) and river estuaries.

Saint-Simon (French pronunciation: [sɛ̃ simɔ̃]; Languedocien: Sant Simon) is a commune in the Lot department in south-western France.

== See also ==
- Communes of the Lot department
