= Saint-Cirgues, Lot =

Saint-Cirgues
- Commune
- Location of Saint-Cirgues
- Location within France Location within Occitanie
- Coordinates: 44°44′18″N 2°07′30″E
- Country: France
- Region: Occitania
- Department: Lot
- Arrondissement: Figeac
- Canton: Lacapelle-Marival
- Intercommunality: CC Grand-Figeac

Government
  - Mayor (2020–2026): Alain Hebert
- Area^{1}: 32.5 km^{2} (12.5 sq mi)
- Elevation: 555 m (1,821 ft)
- Highest elevation: 657 m (2,156 ft)
- Lowest elevation: 283 m (928 ft)
- Population (2023): 324
  - Density: 9.97/km^{2} (25.8/sq mi)
- Time zone: UTC+01:00 (CET)
  - Summer (DST): UTC+02:00 (CEST)
- INSEE/Postal code: 46255 /46210
- ^{1} French Land Register data, which excludes lakes, ponds, glaciers > 1 km^{2} (0.386 sq mi or 247 acres) and river estuaries.

Saint-Cirgues (French pronunciation: [sɛ̃ siʁɡ]; Occitan: Sant Cirgue) is a commune in the Lot department in south-western France.

== See also ==
- Communes of the Lot department
