= Reyrevignes =

- Commune
- Location of Reyrevignes
- Location within France Location within Occitanie
- Coordinates: 44°39′20″N 1°54′56″E
- Country: France
- Region: Occitania
- Department: Lot
- Arrondissement: Figeac
- Canton: Lacapelle-Marival
- Intercommunality: CC Grand-Figeac

Government
  - Mayor (2020–2026): Jean Tremoulet
- Area^{1}: 12.44 km^{2} (4.80 sq mi)
- Elevation: 380 m (1,250 ft)
- Highest elevation: 388 m (1,273 ft)
- Lowest elevation: 282 m (925 ft)
- Population (2023): 371
  - Density: 29.8/km^{2} (77.2/sq mi)
- Time zone: UTC+01:00 (CET)
  - Summer (DST): UTC+02:00 (CEST)
- INSEE/Postal code: 46237 /46320
- ^{1} French Land Register data, which excludes lakes, ponds, glaciers > 1 km^{2} (0.386 sq mi or 247 acres) and river estuaries.

Reyrevignes (French pronunciation: [ʁɛʁviɲ]; Occitan: Rèirevinhas) is a commune in the Lot department in south-western France.

== See also ==
- Communes of the Lot department
