= Terrou =

- Commune
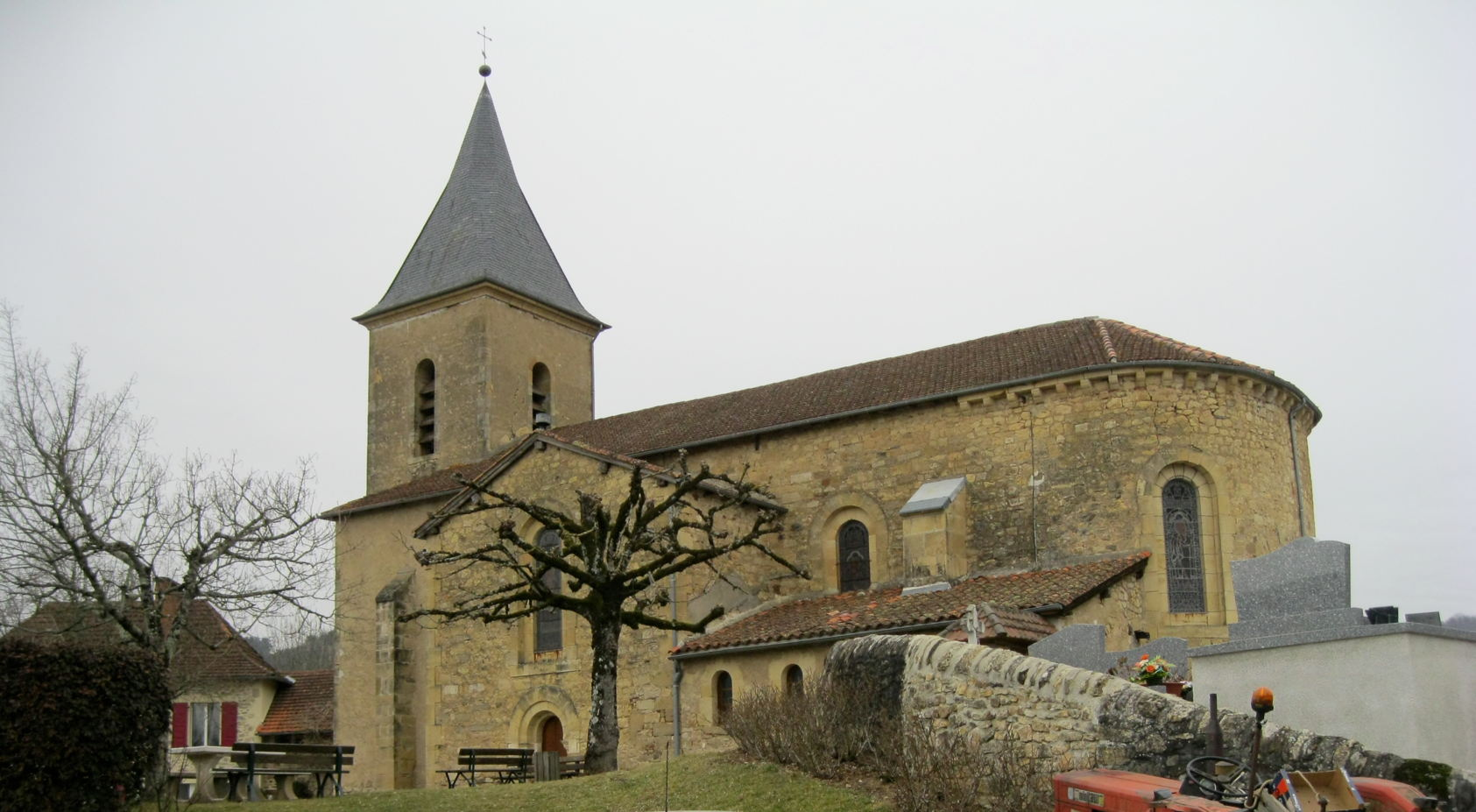
- The church of Terrou
- Location of Terrou
- Location within France Location within Occitanie
- Coordinates: 44°47′05″N 1°59′04″E
- Country: France
- Region: Occitania
- Department: Lot
- Arrondissement: Figeac
- Canton: Lacapelle-Marival
- Intercommunality: Grand-Figeac

Government
  - Mayor (2020–2026): Jean-Pierre Dufourcq
- Area^{1}: 9.94 km^{2} (3.84 sq mi)
- Elevation: 339 m (1,112 ft)
- Highest elevation: 570 m (1,870 ft)
- Lowest elevation: 273 m (896 ft)
- Population (2023): 171
  - Density: 17.2/km^{2} (44.6/sq mi)
- Time zone: UTC+01:00 (CET)
  - Summer (DST): UTC+02:00 (CEST)
- INSEE/Postal code: 46314 /46120
- ^{1} French Land Register data, which excludes lakes, ponds, glaciers > 1 km^{2} (0.386 sq mi or 247 acres) and river estuaries.

Terrou (French pronunciation: [tɛʁu]; Languedocien: Terron) is a commune in the Lot department in south-western France.

== See also ==
- Communes of the Lot department
