= Lauresses =

- Commune
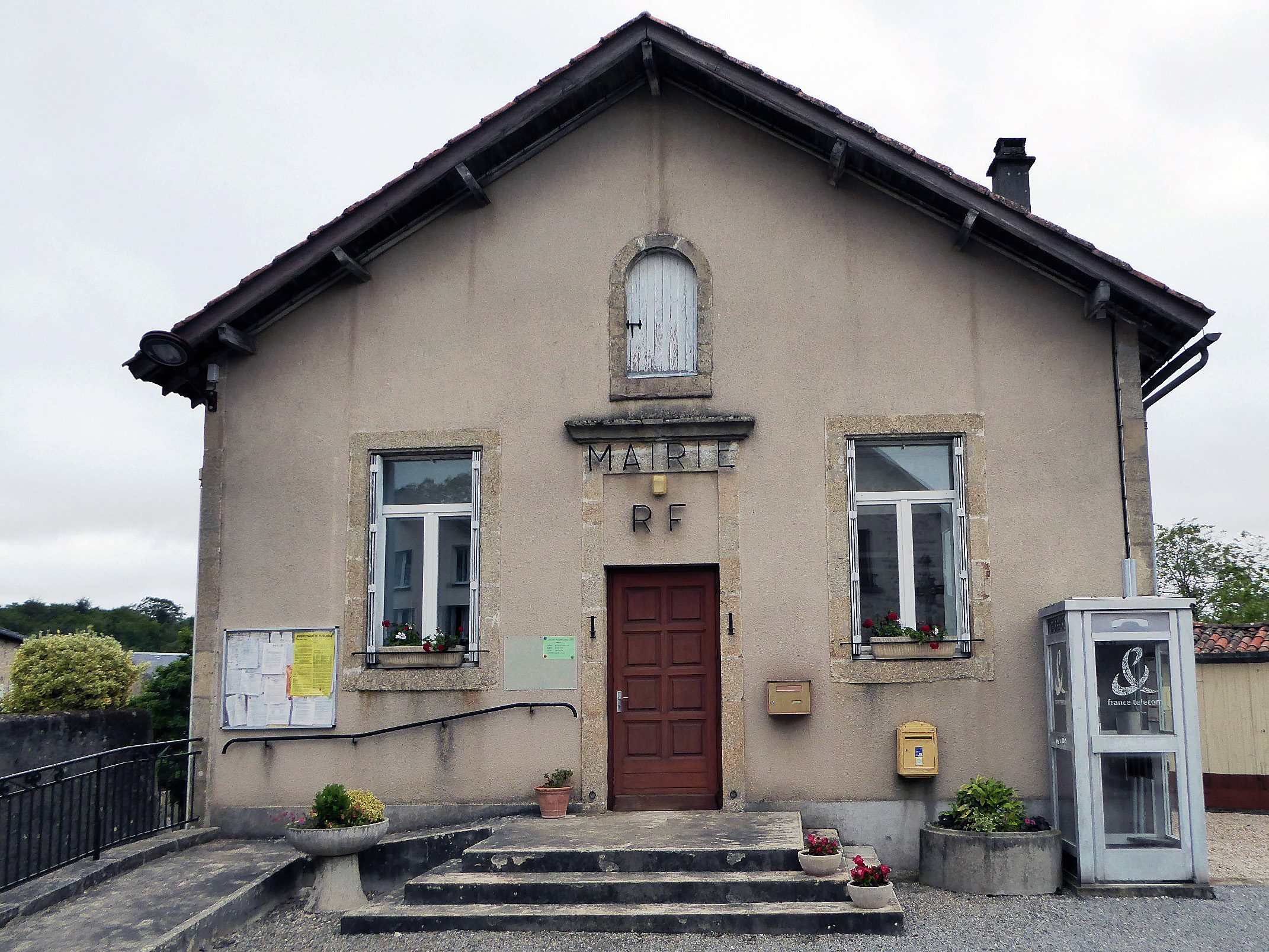
- LAURESSES Town Hall
- Location of Lauresses
- Location within France Location within Occitanie
- Coordinates: 44°46′06″N 2°07′26″E
- Country: France
- Region: Occitania
- Department: Lot
- Arrondissement: Figeac
- Canton: Lacapelle-Marival
- Intercommunality: CC Grand-Figeac

Government
  - Mayor (2020–2026): Martial Juliac
- Area^{1}: 23.73 km^{2} (9.16 sq mi)
- Elevation: 607 m (1,991 ft)
- Highest elevation: 718 m (2,356 ft)
- Lowest elevation: 473 m (1,552 ft)
- Population (2023): 239
  - Density: 10.1/km^{2} (26.1/sq mi)
- Time zone: UTC+01:00 (CET)
  - Summer (DST): UTC+02:00 (CEST)
- INSEE/Postal code: 46161 /46210
- ^{1} French Land Register data, which excludes lakes, ponds, glaciers > 1 km^{2} (0.386 sq mi or 247 acres) and river estuaries.

Lauresses (French pronunciation: [loʁɛs]; Occitan: Laureças) is a commune in the Lot department in south-western France.

== See also ==
- Communes of the Lot department
