= Montet-et-Bouxal =

- Commune
- Location of Montet-et-Bouxal
- Location within France Location within Occitanie
- Coordinates: 44°44′27″N 2°01′10″E
- Country: France
- Region: Occitania
- Department: Lot
- Arrondissement: Figeac
- Canton: Lacapelle-Marival
- Intercommunality: CC Grand-Figeac

Government
  - Mayor (2020–2026): Stéphane Leprettre
- Area^{1}: 11.51 km^{2} (4.44 sq mi)
- Elevation: 594 m (1,949 ft)
- Highest elevation: 643 m (2,110 ft)
- Lowest elevation: 415 m (1,362 ft)
- Population (2023): 213
  - Density: 18.5/km^{2} (47.9/sq mi)
- Time zone: UTC+01:00 (CET)
  - Summer (DST): UTC+02:00 (CEST)
- INSEE/Postal code: 46203 /46210
- ^{1} French Land Register data, which excludes lakes, ponds, glaciers > 1 km^{2} (0.386 sq mi or 247 acres) and river estuaries.

Montet-et-Bouxal (French pronunciation: [mɔ̃tɛ e buksal]; Occitan: Lo Montet e Bojal) is a commune in the Lot department in south-western France.

== See also ==
- Communes of the Lot department
