= Château de Larroque-Toirac =

Castle in Occitania, France

Coordinates: 44°31′17″N 1°56′23″E

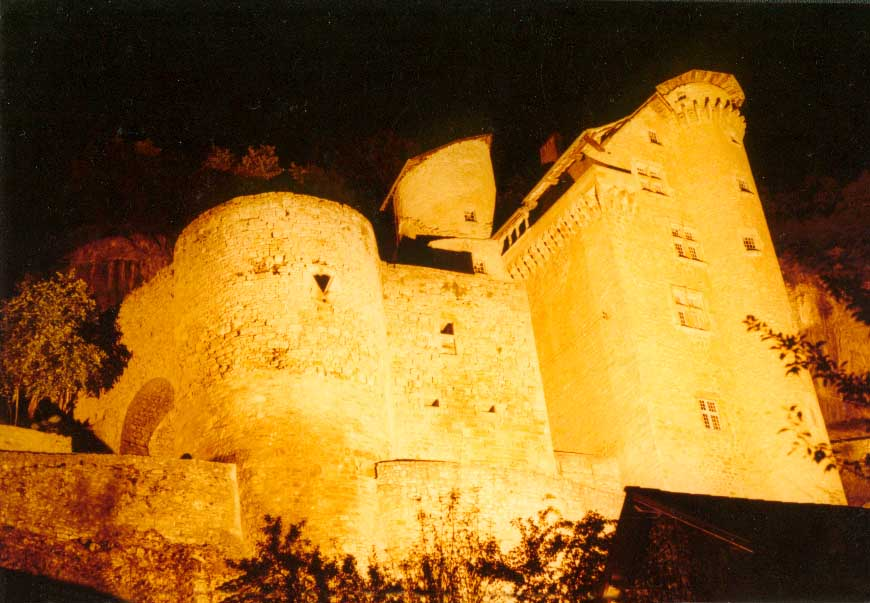
Larroque-Toirac castle at Night

The Château de Larroque-Toirac is a mediaeval castle in the commune of Larroque-Toirac in the Lot département of France. Its origins go back to the 13th century and it was modified at various times up to the last quarter of the 17th century.

Hanging from the side of a high cliff and dominating the village and the valley of the river Lot in an exceptionally defensive site, the castle, which was on several occasions taken by the English, has preserved its mediaeval defence system.

Built as a fortified site in the 13th century, an enceinte was developed during the 14th. A new castle was built in the second half of the 15th century. Decoration from around 1515–1531 survives, as well as work carried out in the 17th century.

The seigneurial residence, where the original kitchen remains, includes chimneys from the 15th century as well as frescos from the 16th century. The cliff behind the castle contains caves which served as trogloditic habitations in ancient times.

The castle entered the Wagner-Autesserre family in 1923. Previously, it had been used by the town hall of Larroque-Toirac as a school or accommodation for teachers.

In 1926, the castle was added to the supplementary list of historic monuments by the French Ministry of Culture, though this was later annulled. It was classified as a monument historique in 1995. Though privately owned, the castle is open to visitors every summer.

== See also ==
- List of castles in France
