= Sonac =

- Commune
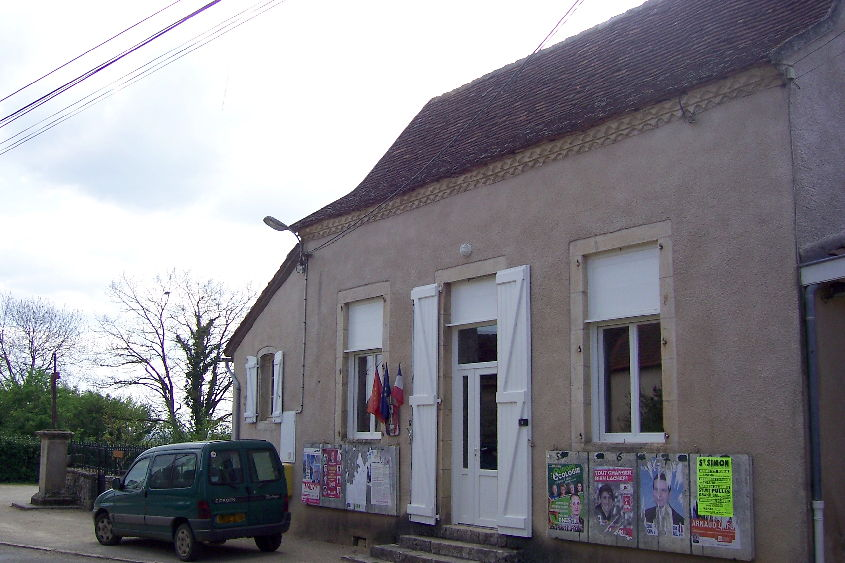
- The town hall in Sonac
- Location of Sonac
- Location within France Location within Occitanie
- Coordinates: 44°41′50″N 1°51′38″E
- Country: France
- Region: Occitania
- Department: Lot
- Arrondissement: Figeac
- Canton: Lacapelle-Marival
- Intercommunality: CC Grand-Figeac

Government
  - Mayor (2020–2026): Claudine Bessede
- Area^{1}: 7.34 km^{2} (2.83 sq mi)
- Elevation: 340 m (1,120 ft)
- Highest elevation: 421 m (1,381 ft)
- Lowest elevation: 305 m (1,001 ft)
- Population (2023): 94
  - Density: 13/km^{2} (33/sq mi)
- Time zone: UTC+01:00 (CET)
  - Summer (DST): UTC+02:00 (CEST)
- INSEE/Postal code: 46306 /46320
- ^{1} French Land Register data, which excludes lakes, ponds, glaciers > 1 km^{2} (0.386 sq mi or 247 acres) and river estuaries.

Sonac (French pronunciation: [sɔnak]) is a commune in the Lot department in south-western France.

== See also ==
- Communes of the Lot department
