= Espeyroux =

- Commune
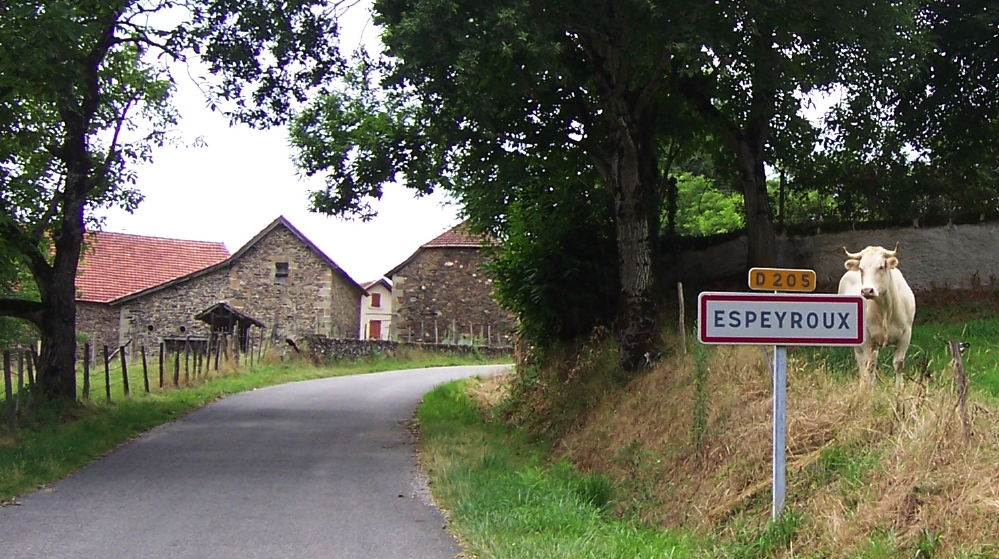
- The D205 road into Espeyroux
- Location of Espeyroux
- Location within France Location within Occitanie
- Coordinates: 44°45′48″N 1°55′25″E
- Country: France
- Region: Occitania
- Department: Lot
- Arrondissement: Figeac
- Canton: Lacapelle-Marival
- Intercommunality: Grand-Figeac

Government
  - Mayor (2020–2026): Josiane Pradayrol
- Area^{1}: 7.64 km^{2} (2.95 sq mi)
- Elevation: 500 m (1,600 ft)
- Highest elevation: 627 m (2,057 ft)
- Lowest elevation: 395 m (1,296 ft)
- Population (2023): 98
  - Density: 13/km^{2} (33/sq mi)
- Time zone: UTC+01:00 (CET)
  - Summer (DST): UTC+02:00 (CEST)
- INSEE/Postal code: 46096 /46120
- ^{1} French Land Register data, which excludes lakes, ponds, glaciers > 1 km^{2} (0.386 sq mi or 247 acres) and river estuaries.

Espeyroux is a commune in the Lot department in south-western France.

== See also ==
- Communes of the Lot department
