= Le Bouyssou =

- Commune
- Location of Le Bouyssou
- Location within France Location within Occitanie
- Coordinates: 44°41′35″N 1°56′37″E
- Country: France
- Region: Occitania
- Department: Lot
- Arrondissement: Figeac
- Canton: Lacapelle-Marival

Government
  - Mayor (2020–2026): Daniel Salis
- Area^{1}: 5.62 km^{2} (2.17 sq mi)
- Elevation: 440 m (1,440 ft)
- Highest elevation: 594 m (1,949 ft)
- Lowest elevation: 291 m (955 ft)
- Population (2023): 121
  - Density: 21.5/km^{2} (55.8/sq mi)
- Time zone: UTC+01:00 (CET)
  - Summer (DST): UTC+02:00 (CEST)
- INSEE/Postal code: 46036 /46120
- ^{1} French Land Register data, which excludes lakes, ponds, glaciers > 1 km^{2} (0.386 sq mi or 247 acres) and river estuaries.

Le Bouyssou (French pronunciation: [lə bwisu]; Occitan: Lo Boisson) is a commune in the Lot department in southwestern France.

== Population ==
Historical population
Year	Pop.	±% p.a.
1968	130	—
1975	87	−5.58%
1982	113	+3.81%
1990	114	+0.11%
1999	111	−0.30%
2007	137	+2.67%
2012	128	−1.35%
2017	139	+1.66%
2023	121	−2.28%
Source: INSEE

== See also ==
- Communes of the Lot department
