= Sainte-Colombe, Lot =

Sainte-Colombe
- Commune
- Location of Sainte-Colombe
- Location within France Location within Occitanie
- Coordinates: 44°43′28″N 2°00′11″E
- Country: France
- Region: Occitania
- Department: Lot
- Arrondissement: Figeac
- Canton: Lacapelle-Marival

Government
  - Mayor (2020–2026): Roger Landes
- Area^{1}: 11.35 km^{2} (4.38 sq mi)
- Elevation: 580 m (1,900 ft)
- Highest elevation: 612 m (2,008 ft)
- Lowest elevation: 361 m (1,184 ft)
- Population (2023): 236
  - Density: 20.8/km^{2} (53.9/sq mi)
- Time zone: UTC+01:00 (CET)
  - Summer (DST): UTC+02:00 (CEST)
- INSEE/Postal code: 46260 /46120
- ^{1} French Land Register data, which excludes lakes, ponds, glaciers > 1 km^{2} (0.386 sq mi or 247 acres) and river estuaries.

Sainte-Colombe (French pronunciation: [sɛ̃t kɔlɔ̃b]; Languedocien: Senta Colomba) is a commune in the Lot department in south-western France.

== See also ==
- Communes of the Lot department
