= Saint-Médard-Nicourby =

- Commune
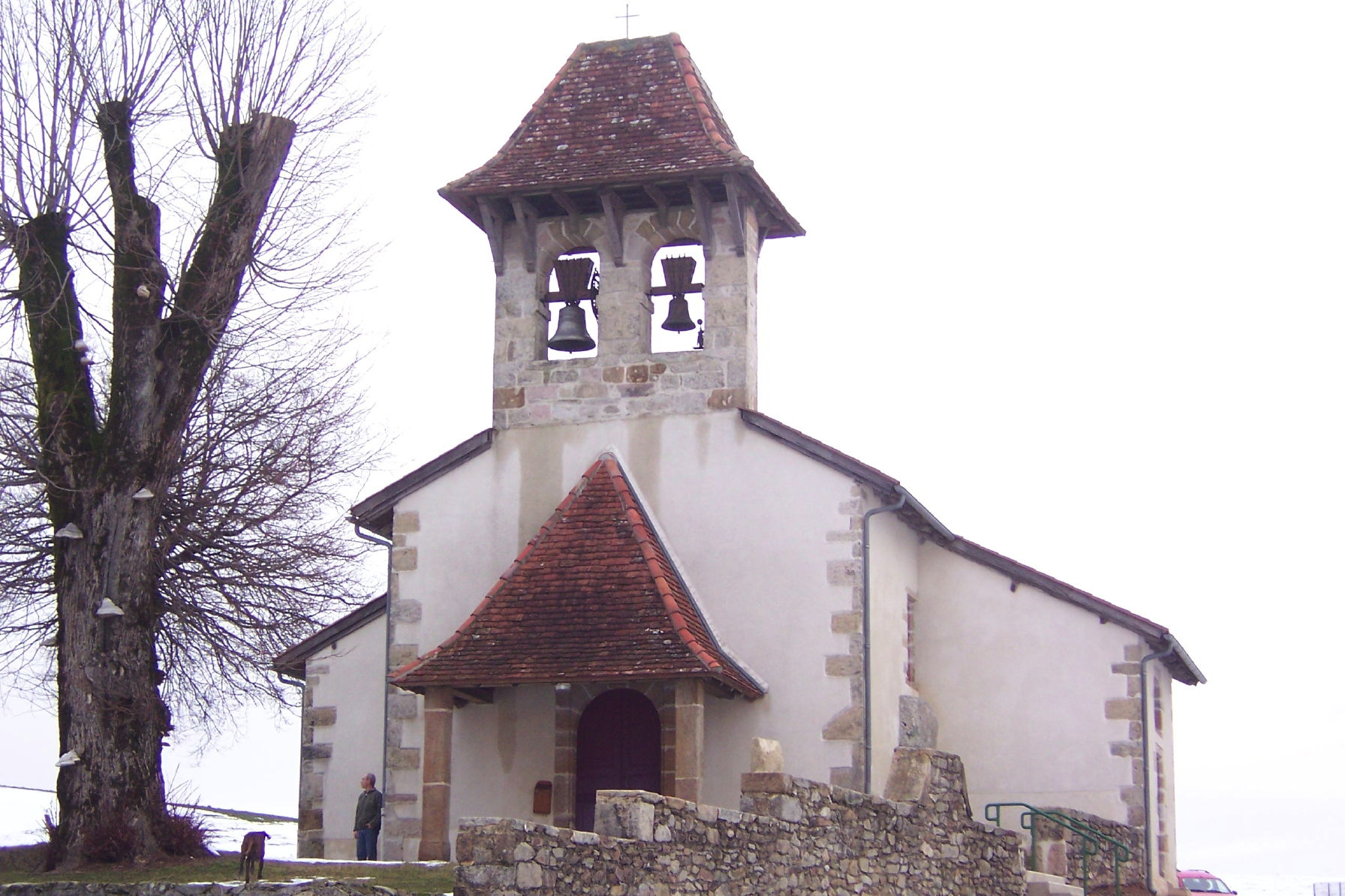
- The church of Saint-Medard-Nicourby
- Location of Saint-Médard-Nicourby
- Location within France Location within Occitanie
- Coordinates: 44°46′04″N 2°01′16″E
- Country: France
- Region: Occitania
- Department: Lot
- Arrondissement: Figeac
- Canton: Lacapelle-Marival

Government
  - Mayor (2020–2026): Jean-Marie Roussiès
- Area^{1}: 7.77 km^{2} (3.00 sq mi)
- Elevation: 560 m (1,840 ft)
- Highest elevation: 608 m (1,995 ft)
- Lowest elevation: 347 m (1,138 ft)
- Population (2023): 99
  - Density: 13/km^{2} (33/sq mi)
- Time zone: UTC+01:00 (CET)
  - Summer (DST): UTC+02:00 (CEST)
- INSEE/Postal code: 46282 /46210
- ^{1} French Land Register data, which excludes lakes, ponds, glaciers > 1 km^{2} (0.386 sq mi or 247 acres) and river estuaries.

Saint-Médard-Nicourby (French pronunciation: [sɛ̃ medaʁ nikuʁbi]; Languedocien: Sant Miard (Nicorbin)) is a commune in the Lot department in south-western France.

== See also ==
- Communes of the Lot department
