= Latronquière =

- Commune
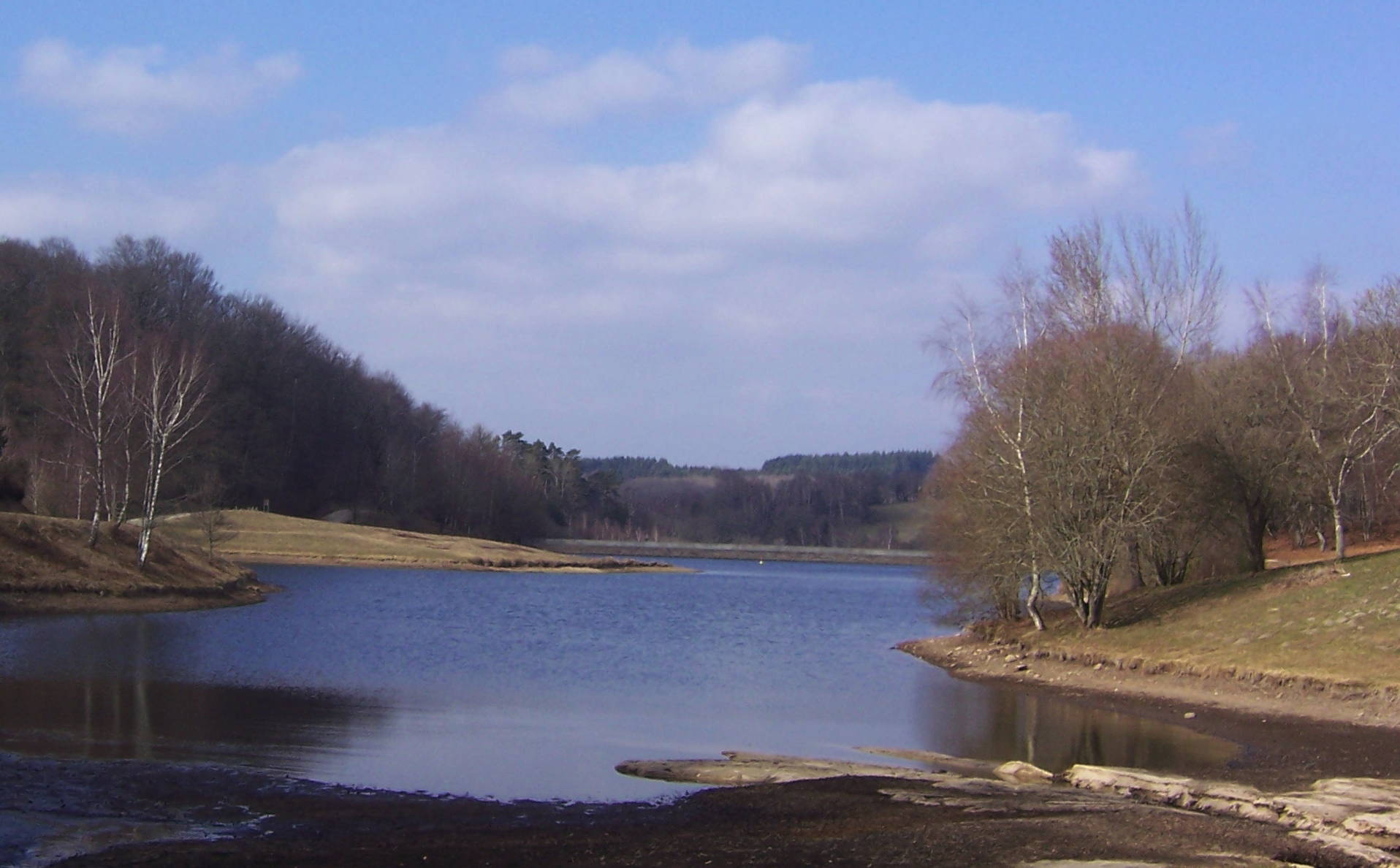
- Tolerme Lake
- Location of Latronquière
- Location within France Location within Occitanie
- Coordinates: 44°48′02″N 2°04′44″E
- Country: France
- Region: Occitania
- Department: Lot
- Arrondissement: Figeac
- Canton: Lacapelle-Marival
- Intercommunality: Grand-Figeac

Government
  - Mayor (2020–2026): Éliane Lavergne
- Area^{1}: 10.37 km^{2} (4.00 sq mi)
- Elevation: 650 m (2,130 ft)
- Highest elevation: 694 m (2,277 ft)
- Lowest elevation: 549 m (1,801 ft)
- Population (2023): 447
  - Density: 43.1/km^{2} (112/sq mi)
- Time zone: UTC+01:00 (CET)
  - Summer (DST): UTC+02:00 (CEST)
- INSEE/Postal code: 46160 /46210
- ^{1} French Land Register data, which excludes lakes, ponds, glaciers > 1 km^{2} (0.386 sq mi or 247 acres) and river estuaries.

Latronquière (French pronunciation: [latʁɔ̃kjɛʁ]; Occitan: La Tronquièra) is a commune in the Lot department in south-western France.

== See also ==
- Communes of the Lot department
