= Théminettes =

- Commune
- Location of Théminettes
- Location within France Location within Occitanie
- Coordinates: 44°42′50″N 1°51′12″E
- Country: France
- Region: Occitania
- Department: Lot
- Arrondissement: Figeac
- Canton: Lacapelle-Marival

Government
  - Mayor (2020–2026): Alain Cipière
- Area^{1}: 8.71 km^{2} (3.36 sq mi)
- Elevation: 350 m (1,150 ft)
- Highest elevation: 411 m (1,348 ft)
- Lowest elevation: 312 m (1,024 ft)
- Population (2023): 181
  - Density: 20.8/km^{2} (53.8/sq mi)
- Time zone: UTC+01:00 (CET)
  - Summer (DST): UTC+02:00 (CEST)
- INSEE/Postal code: 46319 /46120
- ^{1} French Land Register data, which excludes lakes, ponds, glaciers > 1 km^{2} (0.386 sq mi or 247 acres) and river estuaries.

Théminettes (French pronunciation: [teminɛt]; Occitan: Teminetas) is a commune in the Lot department in south-western France.

== See also ==
- Communes of the Lot department
