= Issepts =

- Commune
- Coat of arms
- Location of Issepts
- Location within France Location within Occitanie
- Coordinates: 44°40′33″N 1°55′36″E
- Country: France
- Region: Occitania
- Department: Lot
- Arrondissement: Figeac
- Canton: Lacapelle-Marival
- Intercommunality: CC Grand-Figeac

Government
  - Mayor (2023–2026): Sophie Loubeyre
- Area^{1}: 9.15 km^{2} (3.53 sq mi)
- Elevation: 281 m (922 ft)
- Highest elevation: 444 m (1,457 ft)
- Lowest elevation: 267 m (876 ft)
- Population (2023): 266
  - Density: 29.1/km^{2} (75.3/sq mi)
- Time zone: UTC+01:00 (CET)
  - Summer (DST): UTC+02:00 (CEST)
- INSEE/Postal code: 46133 /46320
- ^{1} French Land Register data, which excludes lakes, ponds, glaciers > 1 km^{2} (0.386 sq mi or 247 acres) and river estuaries.

Issepts is a commune in the Lot department in south-western France.

== See also ==
- Communes of the Lot department
