= Le Bourg =

- Commune
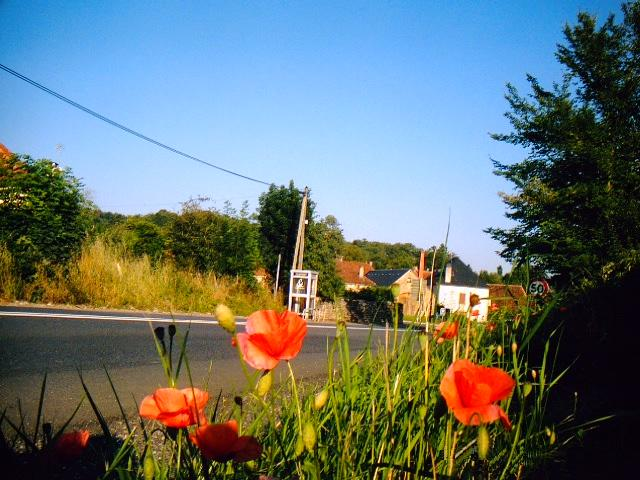
- The road into Le Bourg
- Location of Le Bourg
- Location within France Location within Occitanie
- Coordinates: 44°42′36″N 1°54′15″E
- Country: France
- Region: Occitania
- Department: Lot
- Arrondissement: Figeac
- Canton: Lacapelle-Marival

Government
  - Mayor (2020–2026): Serge Moulènes
- Area^{1}: 13.15 km^{2} (5.08 sq mi)
- Elevation: 360 m (1,180 ft)
- Highest elevation: 565 m (1,854 ft)
- Lowest elevation: 336 m (1,102 ft)
- Population (2023): 298
  - Density: 22.7/km^{2} (58.7/sq mi)
- Time zone: UTC+01:00 (CET)
  - Summer (DST): UTC+02:00 (CEST)
- INSEE/Postal code: 46034 /46120
- ^{1} French Land Register data, which excludes lakes, ponds, glaciers > 1 km^{2} (0.386 sq mi or 247 acres) and river estuaries.

Le Bourg (French pronunciation: [lə buʁ]; Occitan: Lo Borg) is a commune located in the Lot department and Occitanie region of southwestern France.

== Population ==
Historical population
Year	Pop.	±% p.a.
1968	228	—
1975	218	−0.64%
1982	222	+0.26%
1990	229	+0.39%
1999	246	+0.80%
2007	297	+2.38%
2012	296	−0.07%
2017	331	+2.26%
2023	298	−1.74%
Source: INSEE

== See also ==
- Communes of the Lot department
