= Livernon =

- Commune
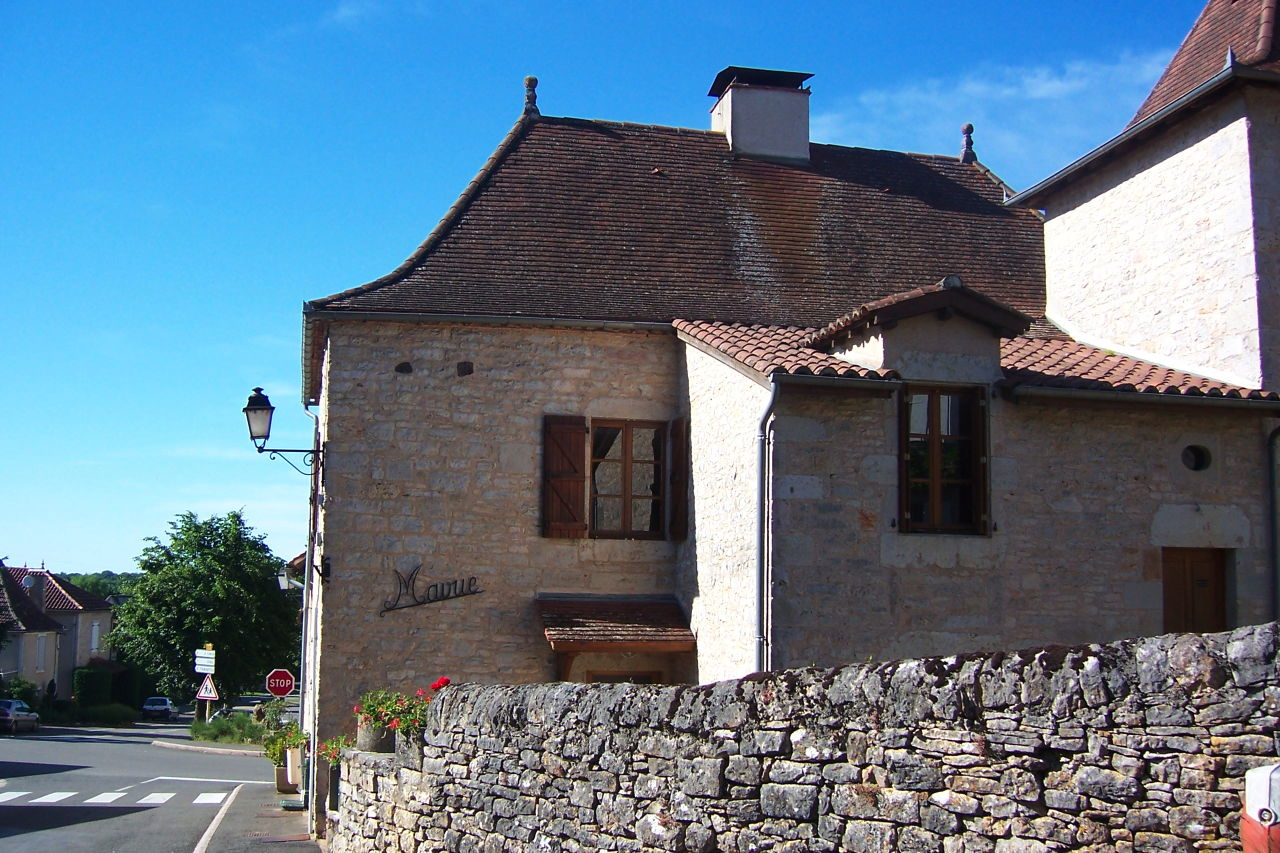
- Livernon town hall

- Coat of arms
- Location of Livernon
- Location within France Location within Occitanie
- Coordinates: 44°38′53″N 1°50′36″E
- Country: France
- Region: Occitania
- Department: Lot
- Arrondissement: Figeac
- Canton: Lacapelle-Marival
- Intercommunality: CC Grand-Figeac

Government
  - Mayor (2020–2026): Jacques Coldefy
- Area^{1}: 25.86 km^{2} (9.98 sq mi)
- Elevation: 328 m (1,076 ft)
- Highest elevation: 358 m (1,175 ft)
- Lowest elevation: 275 m (902 ft)
- Population (2023): 722
  - Density: 27.9/km^{2} (72.3/sq mi)
- Demonym(s): Livernonais, Livernonaises
- Time zone: UTC+01:00 (CET)
  - Summer (DST): UTC+02:00 (CEST)
- INSEE/Postal code: 46176 /46320
- ^{1} French Land Register data, which excludes lakes, ponds, glaciers > 1 km^{2} (0.386 sq mi or 247 acres) and river estuaries.

Livernon (French pronunciation: [livɛʁnɔ̃]) is a commune in the Lot department in south-western France.

== See also ==
- Communes of the Lot department
