= Saint-Maurice-en-Quercy =

- Commune
- Location of Saint-Maurice-en-Quercy
- Location within France Location within Occitanie
- Coordinates: 44°44′39″N 1°56′53″E
- Country: France
- Region: Occitania
- Department: Lot
- Arrondissement: Figeac
- Canton: Lacapelle-Marival
- Intercommunality: CC Grand-Figeac

Government
  - Mayor (2020–2026): Gilbert Destruel
- Area^{1}: 13 km^{2} (5.0 sq mi)
- Elevation: 500 m (1,600 ft)
- Highest elevation: 605 m (1,985 ft)
- Lowest elevation: 368 m (1,207 ft)
- Population (2023): 202
  - Density: 16/km^{2} (40/sq mi)
- Time zone: UTC+01:00 (CET)
  - Summer (DST): UTC+02:00 (CEST)
- INSEE/Postal code: 46279 /46120
- ^{1} French Land Register data, which excludes lakes, ponds, glaciers > 1 km^{2} (0.386 sq mi or 247 acres) and river estuaries.

Saint-Maurice-en-Quercy (French: [sɛ̃ mɔʁis ɑ̃ kɛʁsi]; literally "Saint-Maurice in Quercy"; Occitan: Sent Maurice de Carcin) is a commune in the Lot department in south-western France.

== See also ==
- Communes of the Lot department
