= Anglars =

- Commune
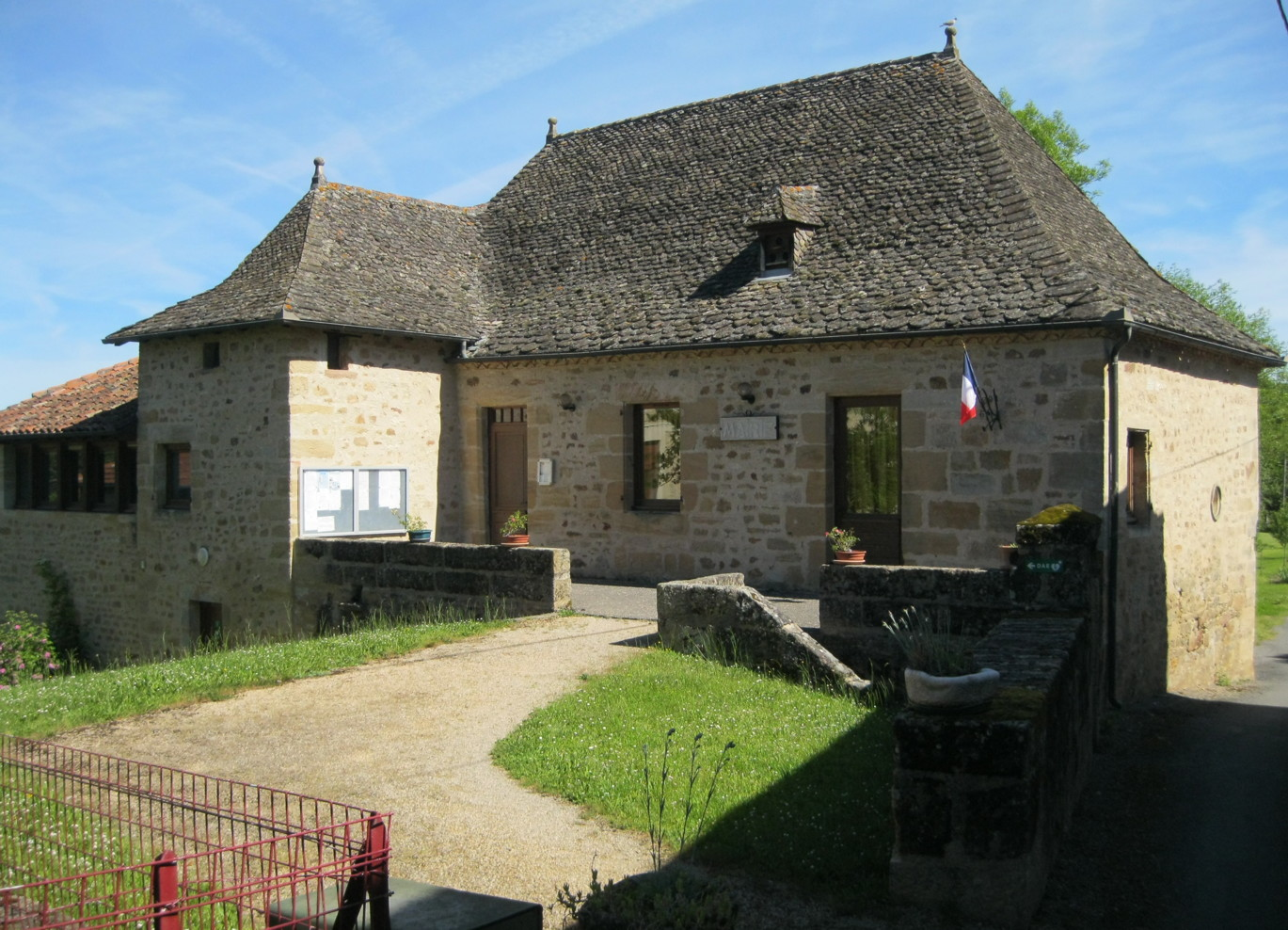
- Town hall
- Location of Anglars
- Location within France Location within Occitanie
- Coordinates: 44°44′26″N 1°54′23″E
- Country: France
- Region: Occitania
- Department: Lot
- Arrondissement: Figeac
- Canton: Lacapelle-Marival
- Intercommunality: Grand-Figeac

Government
  - Mayor (2020–2026): Claudine Vermande
- Area^{1}: 9.99 km^{2} (3.86 sq mi)
- Elevation: 400 m (1,300 ft)
- Highest elevation: 561 m (1,841 ft)
- Lowest elevation: 328 m (1,076 ft)
- Population (2023): 218
  - Density: 21.8/km^{2} (56.5/sq mi)
- Time zone: UTC+01:00 (CET)
  - Summer (DST): UTC+02:00 (CEST)
- INSEE/Postal code: 46004 /46120
- ^{1} French Land Register data, which excludes lakes, ponds, glaciers > 1 km^{2} (0.386 sq mi or 247 acres) and river estuaries.

Anglars (French pronunciation: [ɑ̃ɡlaʁ]) is a commune in the Lot department in southwestern France.

== Population ==
Historical population
Year	Pop.	±% p.a.
1968	193	—
1975	170	−1.80%
1982	182	+0.98%
1990	172	−0.70%
1999	163	−0.60%
2007	156	−0.55%
2012	201	+5.20%
2017	214	+1.26%
2023	218	+0.31%
Source: INSEE

Inhabitants are called Anglarsois in French.

== See also ==
- Communes of the Lot department
