= Saint-Hilaire, Lot =

Saint-Hilaire
- Commune
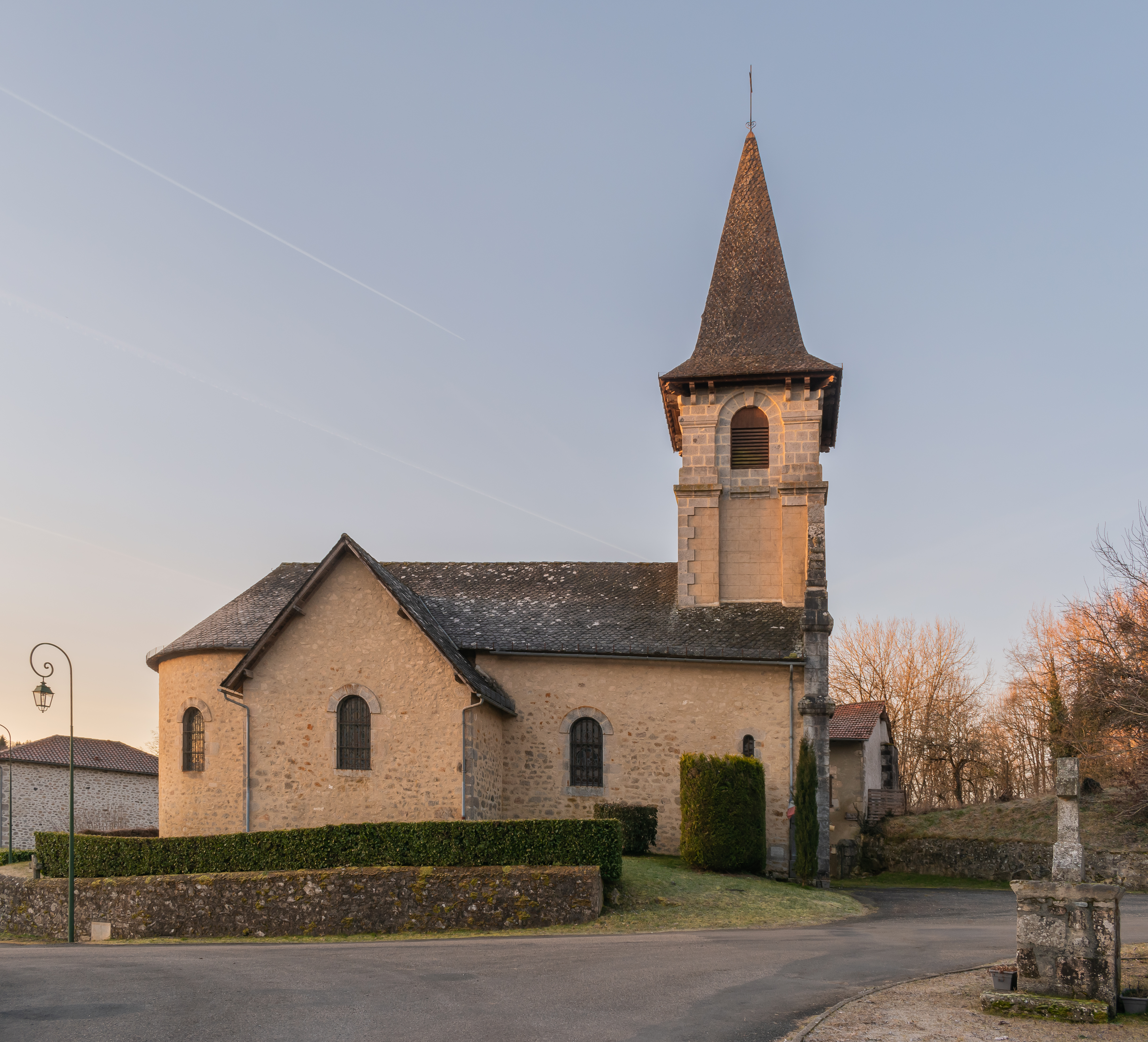
- The church in Saint-Hilaire
- Location of Saint-Hilaire
- Location within France Location within Occitanie
- Coordinates: 44°46′34″N 2°09′21″E
- Country: France
- Region: Occitania
- Department: Lot
- Arrondissement: Figeac
- Canton: Lacapelle-Marival

Government
  - Mayor (2020–2026): Guy Lafon
- Area^{1}: 7.93 km^{2} (3.06 sq mi)
- Elevation: 520 m (1,710 ft)
- Highest elevation: 693 m (2,274 ft)
- Lowest elevation: 469 m (1,539 ft)
- Population (2023): 65
  - Density: 8.2/km^{2} (21/sq mi)
- Time zone: UTC+01:00 (CET)
  - Summer (DST): UTC+02:00 (CEST)
- INSEE/Postal code: 46269 /46210
- ^{1} French Land Register data, which excludes lakes, ponds, glaciers > 1 km^{2} (0.386 sq mi or 247 acres) and river estuaries.

Saint-Hilaire (French pronunciation: [sɛ̃.t‿ilɛʁ]; Occitan: Sent Alari) is a commune in the Lot department in south-western France.

== See also ==
- Communes of the Lot department
