= Sénaillac-Latronquière =

- Commune
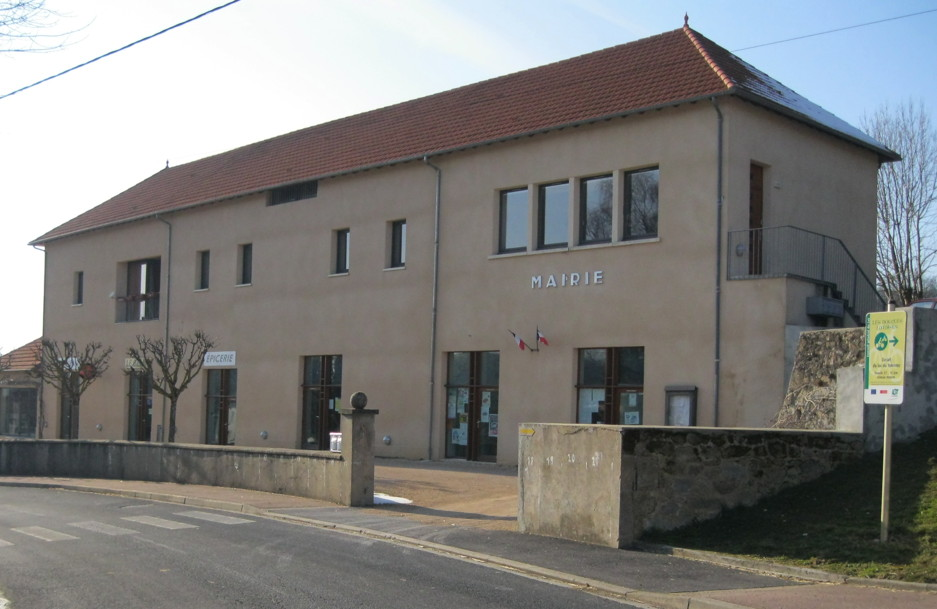
- The town hall of Senaillac-Latronquiere
- Location of Sénaillac-Latronquière
- Location within France Location within Occitanie
- Coordinates: 44°49′34″N 2°03′39″E
- Country: France
- Region: Occitania
- Department: Lot
- Arrondissement: Figeac
- Canton: Lacapelle-Marival
- Intercommunality: CC Grand-Figeac

Government
  - Mayor (2020–2026): Michel Le Roux
- Area^{1}: 11.26 km^{2} (4.35 sq mi)
- Elevation: 557 m (1,827 ft)
- Highest elevation: 725 m (2,379 ft)
- Lowest elevation: 516 m (1,693 ft)
- Population (2023): 127
  - Density: 11.3/km^{2} (29.2/sq mi)
- Time zone: UTC+01:00 (CET)
  - Summer (DST): UTC+02:00 (CEST)
- INSEE/Postal code: 46302 /46210
- ^{1} French Land Register data, which excludes lakes, ponds, glaciers > 1 km^{2} (0.386 sq mi or 247 acres) and river estuaries.

Sénaillac-Latronquière (French pronunciation: [senajak latʁɔ̃kjɛʁ]; Occitan: Senalhac de la Tronquièra) is a commune in the Lot department in south-western France.

== See also ==
- Communes of the Lot department
