= Canton of Lacapelle-Marival =

Coordinates: 44.73°N 1.93°E

The canton of Lacapelle-Marival is an administrative division of the Lot department, southern France. Its borders were modified at the French canton reorganisation which came into effect in March 2015. Its seat is in Lacapelle-Marival.

It consists of the following communes:

1. Anglars
2. Assier
3. Bessonies
4. Le Bourg
5. Le Bouyssou
6. Cardaillac
7. Espeyroux
8. Gorses
9. Issepts
10. Labastide-du-Haut-Mont
11. Labathude
12. Lacapelle-Marival
13. Latronquière
14. Lauresses
15. Livernon
16. Montet-et-Bouxal
17. Reyrevignes
18. Rudelle
19. Rueyres
20. Sabadel-Latronquière
21. Saint-Bressou
22. Saint-Cirgues
23. Sainte-Colombe
24. Saint-Hilaire
25. Saint-Maurice-en-Quercy
26. Saint-Médard-Nicourby
27. Saint-Simon
28. Sénaillac-Latronquière
29. Sonac
30. Terrou
31. Thémines
32. Théminettes
