= Gorses =

- Commune
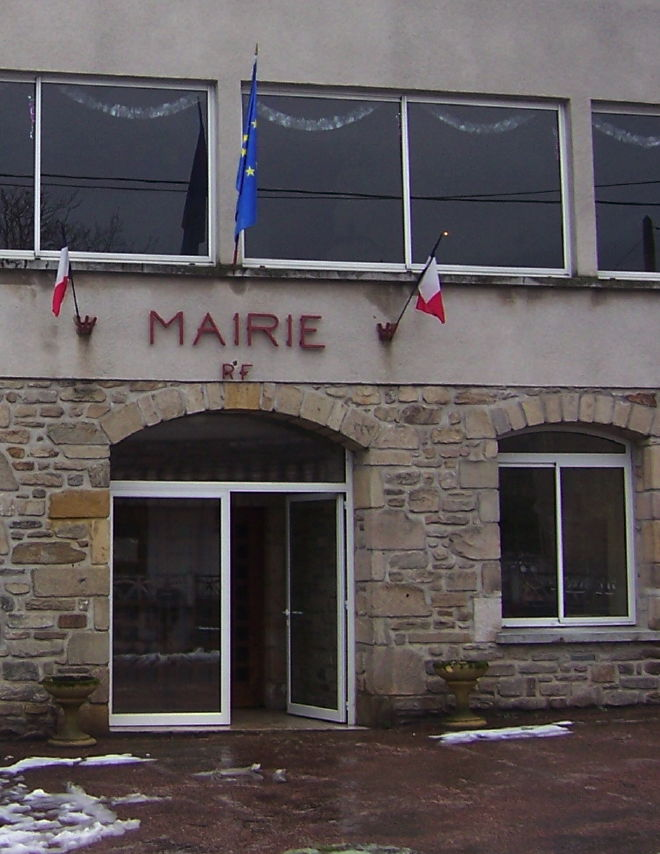
- The town hall in Gorses
- Location of Gorses
- Location within France Location within Occitanie
- Coordinates: 44°47′43″N 2°01′33″E
- Country: France
- Region: Occitania
- Department: Lot
- Arrondissement: Figeac
- Canton: Lacapelle-Marival

Government
  - Mayor (2020–2026): Claudine Rigal
- Area^{1}: 35.60 km^{2} (13.75 sq mi)
- Elevation: 642 m (2,106 ft)
- Highest elevation: 692 m (2,270 ft)
- Lowest elevation: 234 m (768 ft)
- Population (2023): 345
  - Density: 9.69/km^{2} (25.1/sq mi)
- Time zone: UTC+01:00 (CET)
  - Summer (DST): UTC+02:00 (CEST)
- INSEE/Postal code: 46125 /46210
- ^{1} French Land Register data, which excludes lakes, ponds, glaciers > 1 km^{2} (0.386 sq mi or 247 acres) and river estuaries.

Gorses (French pronunciation: [ɡɔʁs]; Occitan: Gòrsas) is a commune in the Lot department in south-western France.

== See also ==
- Communes of the Lot department
