= Saint-Bressou =

- Commune
- Location of Saint-Bressou
- Location within France Location within Occitanie
- Coordinates: 44°42′19″N 1°58′22″E
- Country: France
- Region: Occitania
- Department: Lot
- Arrondissement: Figeac
- Canton: Lacapelle-Marival

Government
  - Mayor (2020–2026): Jean-Louis Griffoul
- Area^{1}: 10.03 km^{2} (3.87 sq mi)
- Elevation: 550 m (1,800 ft)
- Highest elevation: 619 m (2,031 ft)
- Lowest elevation: 274 m (899 ft)
- Population (2023): 124
  - Density: 12.4/km^{2} (32.0/sq mi)
- Time zone: UTC+01:00 (CET)
  - Summer (DST): UTC+02:00 (CEST)
- INSEE/Postal code: 46249 /46120
- ^{1} French Land Register data, which excludes lakes, ponds, glaciers > 1 km^{2} (0.386 sq mi or 247 acres) and river estuaries.

Saint-Bressou (French pronunciation: [sɛ̃ bʁesu]; Occitan: Sent Berçon) is a commune in the Lot department in south-western France.

== See also ==
- Communes of the Lot department
