= Rudelle =

- Commune
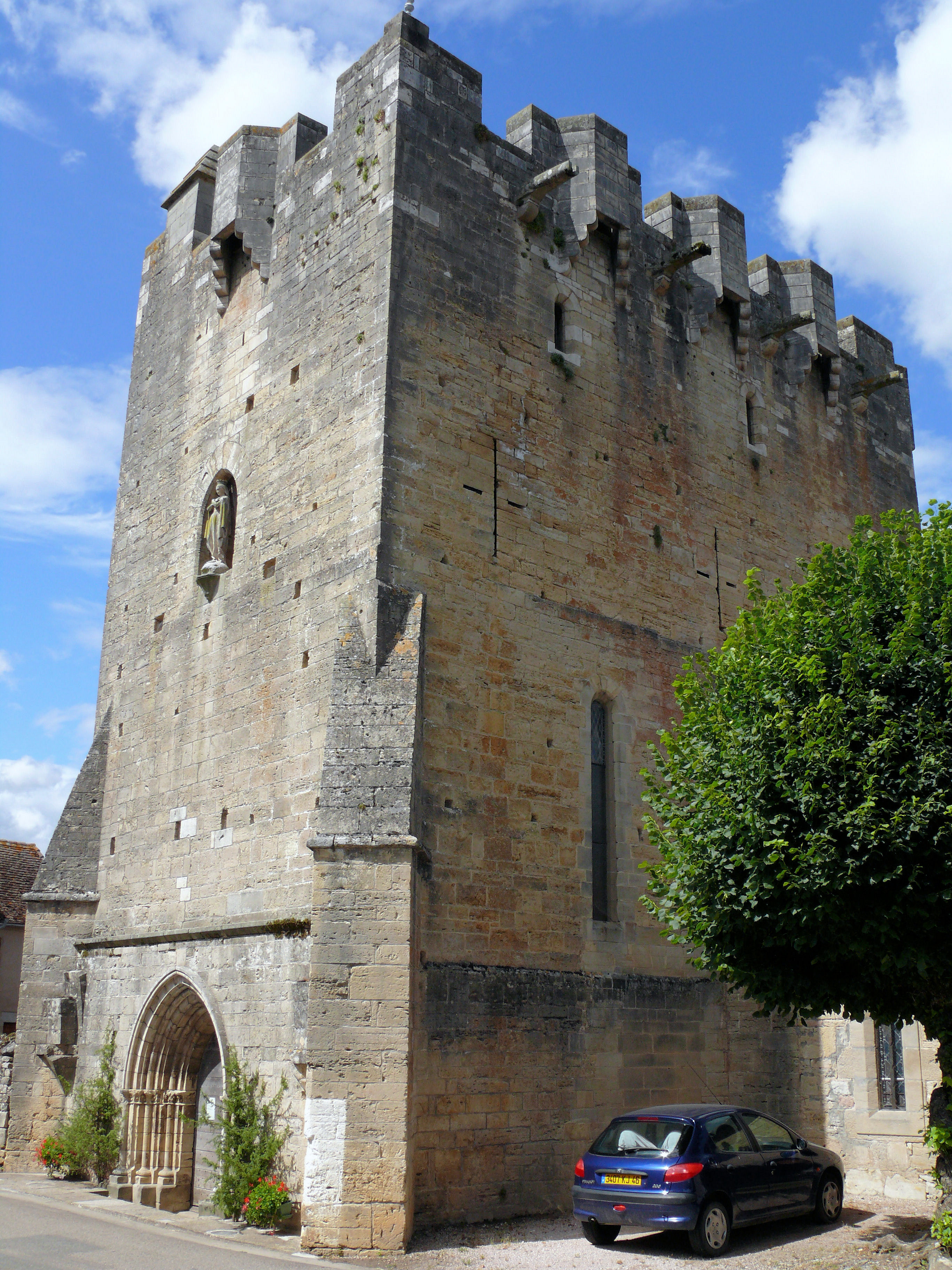
- Saint Martial fortified church, dating from the 13th century.
- Location of Rudelle
- Location within France Location within Occitanie
- Coordinates: 44°43′25″N 1°52′47″E
- Country: France
- Region: Occitania
- Department: Lot
- Arrondissement: Figeac
- Canton: Lacapelle-Marival
- Intercommunality: Grand-Figeac

Government
  - Mayor (2020–2026): Jean-Luc Nayrac
- Area^{1}: 6.83 km^{2} (2.64 sq mi)
- Elevation: 350 m (1,150 ft)
- Highest elevation: 435 m (1,427 ft)
- Lowest elevation: 326 m (1,070 ft)
- Population (2023): 187
  - Density: 27.4/km^{2} (70.9/sq mi)
- Time zone: UTC+01:00 (CET)
  - Summer (DST): UTC+02:00 (CEST)
- INSEE/Postal code: 46242 /46120
- ^{1} French Land Register data, which excludes lakes, ponds, glaciers > 1 km^{2} (0.386 sq mi or 247 acres) and river estuaries.

Rudelle (French pronunciation: [ʁydɛl]; Occitan: Rudèla) is a commune in the Lot department in south-western France.

== See also ==
- Communes of the Lot department
