= Rueyres, Lot =

Rueyres
- Commune
- Location of Rueyres
- Location within France Location within Occitanie
- Coordinates: 44°44′53″N 1°50′49″E
- Country: France
- Region: Occitania
- Department: Lot
- Arrondissement: Figeac
- Canton: Lacapelle-Marival

Government
  - Mayor (2020–2026): Jean-Pierre Delmas
- Area^{1}: 9.31 km^{2} (3.59 sq mi)
- Elevation: 321 m (1,053 ft)
- Highest elevation: 428 m (1,404 ft)
- Lowest elevation: 309 m (1,014 ft)
- Population (2023): 198
  - Density: 21.3/km^{2} (55.1/sq mi)
- Time zone: UTC+01:00 (CET)
  - Summer (DST): UTC+02:00 (CEST)
- INSEE/Postal code: 46243 /46120
- ^{1} French Land Register data, which excludes lakes, ponds, glaciers > 1 km^{2} (0.386 sq mi or 247 acres) and river estuaries.

Rueyres (French pronunciation: [ʁɥɛʁ]; Occitan: Ruèiras) is a commune in the Lot department in south-western France.

== See also ==
- Communes of the Lot department
