= Lacapelle-Marival =

- Commune
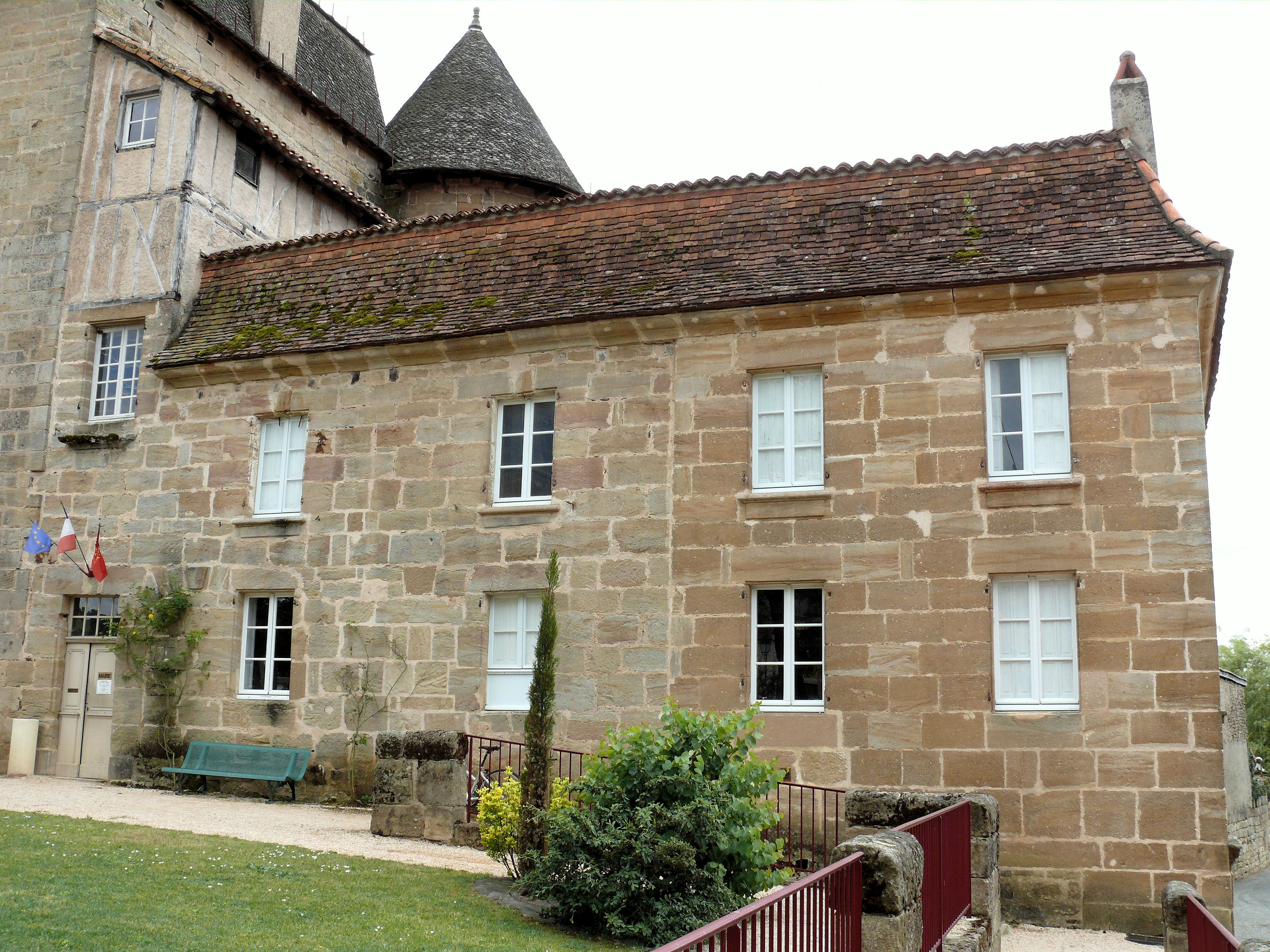
- The town hall in Lacapelle-Marival

- Coat of arms
- Location of Lacapelle-Marival
- Location within France Location within Occitanie
- Coordinates: 44°43′47″N 1°55′36″E
- Country: France
- Region: Occitania
- Department: Lot
- Arrondissement: Figeac
- Canton: Lacapelle-Marival
- Intercommunality: CC Grand-Figeac

Government
  - Mayor (2020–2026): Pascal Lewicki
- Area^{1}: 11.61 km^{2} (4.48 sq mi)
- Elevation: 385 m (1,263 ft)
- Highest elevation: 596 m (1,955 ft)
- Lowest elevation: 353 m (1,158 ft)
- Population (2023): 1,268
  - Density: 109.2/km^{2} (282.9/sq mi)
- Time zone: UTC+01:00 (CET)
  - Summer (DST): UTC+02:00 (CEST)
- INSEE/Postal code: 46143 /46120
- ^{1} French Land Register data, which excludes lakes, ponds, glaciers > 1 km^{2} (0.386 sq mi or 247 acres) and river estuaries.

Lacapelle-Marival (French pronunciation: [lakapɛl maʁival]; Languedocien: La Capèla de Marival) is a commune in the Lot department in south-western France.

== See also ==
- Communes of the Lot department
