= Assier =

- Commune
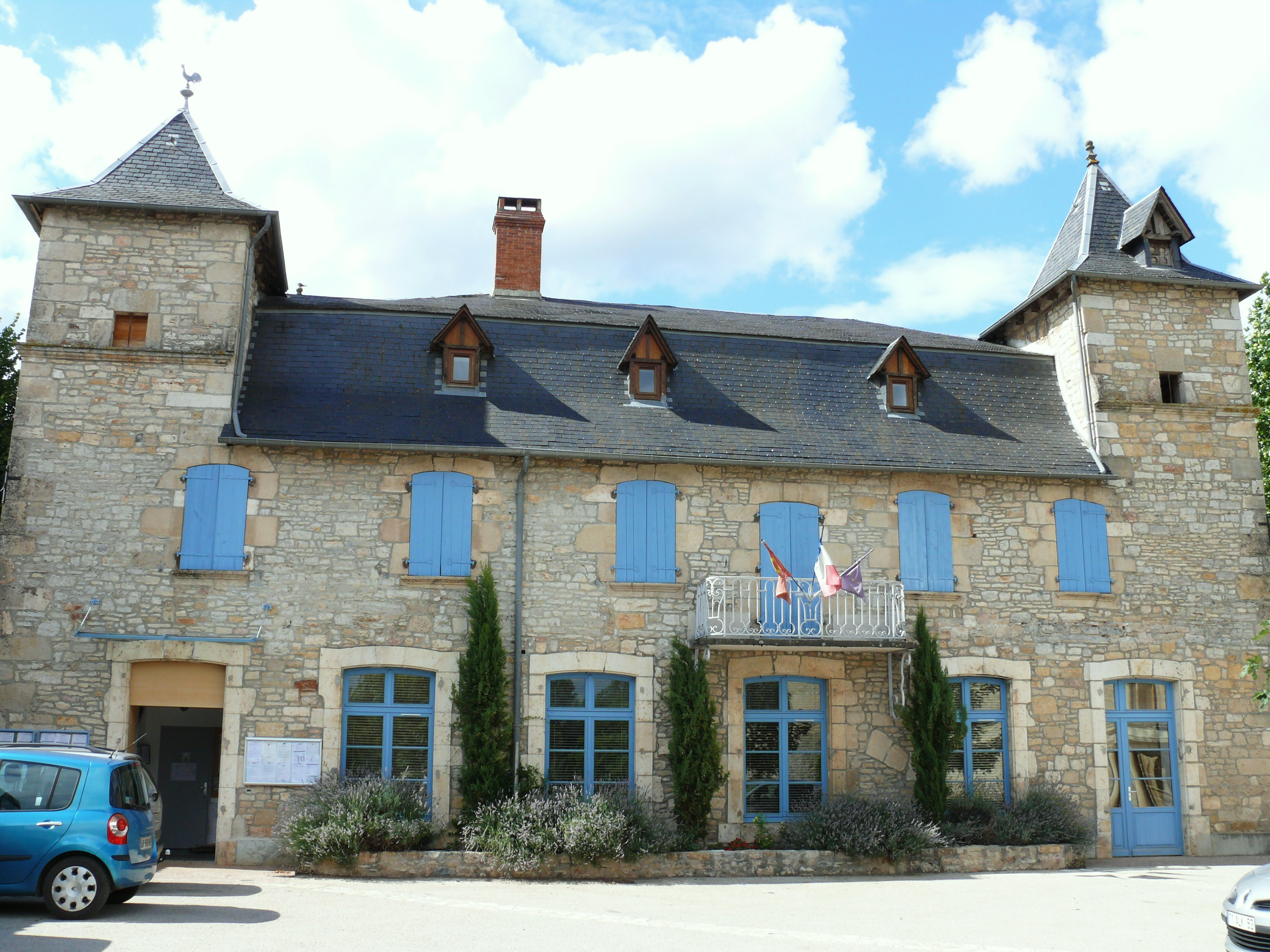
- Assier Town Hall

- Coat of arms
- Location of Assier
- Location within France Location within Occitanie
- Coordinates: 44°40′34″N 1°52′39″E
- Country: France
- Region: Occitania
- Department: Lot
- Arrondissement: Figeac
- Canton: Lacapelle-Marival
- Intercommunality: Grand-Figeac

Government
  - Mayor (2020–2026): Maxime Hug
- Area^{1}: 16.49 km^{2} (6.37 sq mi)
- Elevation: 342 m (1,122 ft)
- Highest elevation: 420 m (1,380 ft)
- Lowest elevation: 294 m (965 ft)
- Population (2023): 709
  - Density: 43.0/km^{2} (111/sq mi)
- Time zone: UTC+01:00 (CET)
  - Summer (DST): UTC+02:00 (CEST)
- INSEE/Postal code: 46009 /46320
- ^{1} French Land Register data, which excludes lakes, ponds, glaciers > 1 km^{2} (0.386 sq mi or 247 acres) and river estuaries.

Assier (French pronunciation: [asje]; Occitan: Assièr) is a commune in the Lot department in the Occitanie region of south-western France.

== Geography ==
=== Location and access ===
Assier is located some 12 km north-west of Figeac and some 18 km south-east of Gramat. The village is in the centre of the commune at the intersection of two highways: the D11 from Saint-Simon in the north-west which continues to Reyrevignes in the south-east and the D653 from Livernon in the south-west which continues to join the D840 north-east of the commune.

The Brive-la-Gaillarde to Rodez railway passes through the commune from north-west to south-east with Assier station just west of the village.

=== Relief ===
The highest parts of the commune are to the north-east (about 400 metres above sea level). The Limargue landscape provides grazing for cattle. A small stream flows with a slight slope parallel to the D653 in a wide valley flooded during heavy rain. After two ponds and an old mill, its water is lost near the centre of the village (altitude 350 metres).

In the south the rocky terrain forms a slightly undulating limestone plateau (320–330 metres above sea level) pierced by a few sinkholes around ten metres deep. This plateau is covered with short grass (dry grasslands) which supports flocks of sheep. There are also forests of contorted downy oaks that are used for firewood.

=== Geology ===
Assier is located at the end of an Early Jurassic formation called Limargue at the edge of the Causses limestone.

In the south-east the Causse de Gramat is composed of Karstified limestone from the Middle and Late Jurassic.

The oldest Early Jurassic terrain is in the Ruisseau d'Assier to the north-west:

- on the level in a tarn of black marl and layers of impervious schist from the Toarcian period;
- permeable calcareous sandstone from the Pliensbachian period in which there are emergences of Routabous and Tour de Maroc to the north at Vialans;
- from a place called Le Parc (in Le Bourg commune), a thin strip of less than 50 metres of semi-permeable marls, Argillites (of mixed clay and quartz), and limestones from the middle and upper Early Jurassic.

The valley floor consists of alluvium brought down by modern streams.

=== Hydro-geology ===
Assier is on the edge of the Causse de Gramat. The waters from the Limargue to the north-east come across impermeable marl from the Early Jurassic the descend below the permeable limestone from the Middle and Late Jurassic. The limit of the Drainage basin is located to the north of Assier, water flows towards the south towards the Célé: this is the system called "Gramat-Sud" which drains 330 square kilometres.

To the north-west, north of Vialans, there are the emergences of Routabous and Tour de Maroc of calcareous sandstone from the Pliensbachian period.

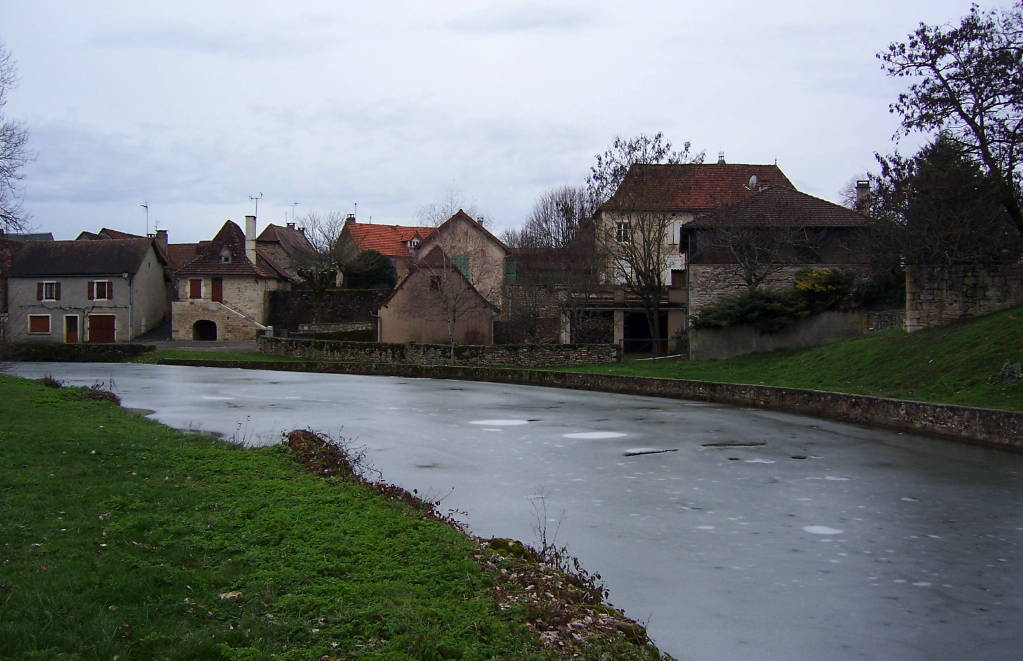
The dam and its retaining wall next to the Chateau of Assier

The small streams or Biales sink into the limestone through karstic openings. From north-west to south-east, these are:.

- The Ruisseau de l'Homme has its source near the Chapel of Saint-Médard (in the Issepts commune). It flows towards the two Pertes d'Assier sinkholes: the first is at the foot of the east wall of the chateau in the ruins of an old mill that was still functioning at the beginning of the 20th century, 75 metres south of the pond formed by the Ruisseau d'Assier at the entry to the town. The second sinkhole is 20 metres east of the pond. These waters flow in the stream that passes near the ponds along the D653 road towards Lacapelle-Marival. The re-emergences are at Saint-Sulpice in the Célé valley 13.5 km away. The time of passage of the water is 12 days.
- The Perte de l'Abois: a temporary sinkhole consisting of an entrance three metres high located in a small valley that crosses the D11 between Assier and Reyrevignes.
- The Perte du Cayre and the Grotte du Pech d'Amont: these cavities are the head of the hydro-geological system that drains water toward the re-emergence of the Diège at Espagnac-Sainte-Eulalie, nine kilometres away. The transit time for the water is 40 hours.

Previously, other cavities at a higher altitude would have been of old sinkholes or were connected to the existing water systems: the Grotte du Cirque and the Grotte du Fennet.

=== Potholing ===
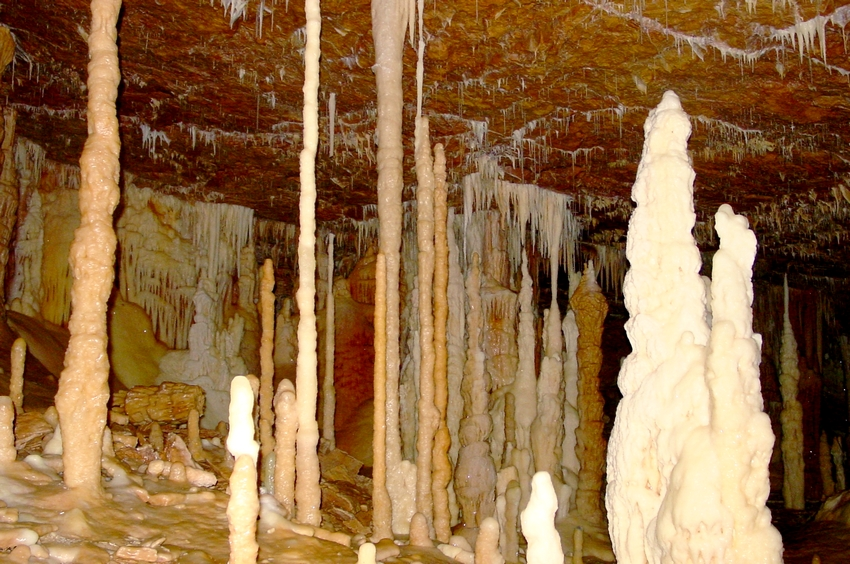
The Grotte du Cirque.

In addition to the sinkholes in the Limargue-Causse contact zone, many caves and Pit caves open up on limestone terrain. The best known are:

- The Grotte du Cirque. This hole is adorned with beautiful concretions. This has been a classified site since 29 April 1997 and monitoring arrangements for visits have been defined since 27 January 2009;
- The Grotte du Fennet. This hole was mentioned in 1894 by Édouard-Alfred Martel. It opens on the side of a sinkhole through a low passage and a corridor 60 metres long leading to a shaft 15 metres deep then a large gallery 45 metres long, 20 m wide and 30 m high. A narrow passage and a shaft lead to a low point of about 45 metres underground.

== Toponymy ==
The name Assier could be related to the name of a watercourse according to Ernest Nègre. According to others Assier has a Germanic origin after a person called Anshari. This name decomposes to: ans, a pagan deity, and hari meaning "army".

== History ==
=== Prehistory ===
The territory of Assier has been inhabited from the earliest times. Three dolmens and tumuli are visible on the limestone of the plateau to the east of the village.

The dolmens around Assier were made from thick strata of limestone. They are located on the Causse de Gramat and were emptied of their contents in the past.

- The Dolmen in the Bois des Bœufs is covered with a slab 3.7 metres long, 2.6 m wide and 0.3 m thick with an approximate mass of about 8 tonnes. This capstone rests on two orthostats with a length of about 3 m and 0.6 m high. It has been a historical monument since 1889;
- At an altitude 200 metres higher than the preceding dolmen, the Dolmen of Garivals has a slab 2.3 metres long, 2m wide, and 0.3m thick resting on two orthostats of unequal length: 2.9 and 2.3 metres. This dolmen includes a Dry stone wall;
- The Dolmen of the Table de Roux has a slab 3.3 metres long, 2.5 m wide, and 0.3 m thick placed on two orthostats 4 metres long.

Four other dolmens and a menhir were also present north-west of the village in the hamlet of Mons at a place called Le champ de Belair. At least two of these dolmens are still visible. The menhir was removed in the past but was returned flat near its original location by the landowner.

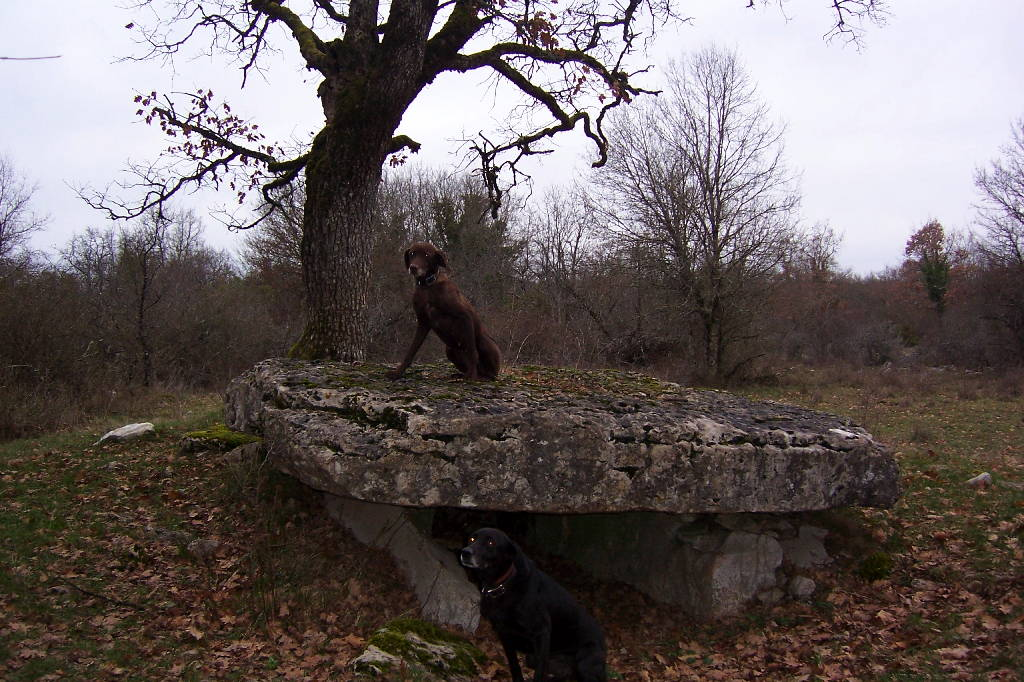
The Dolmen in the Bois des bœufs

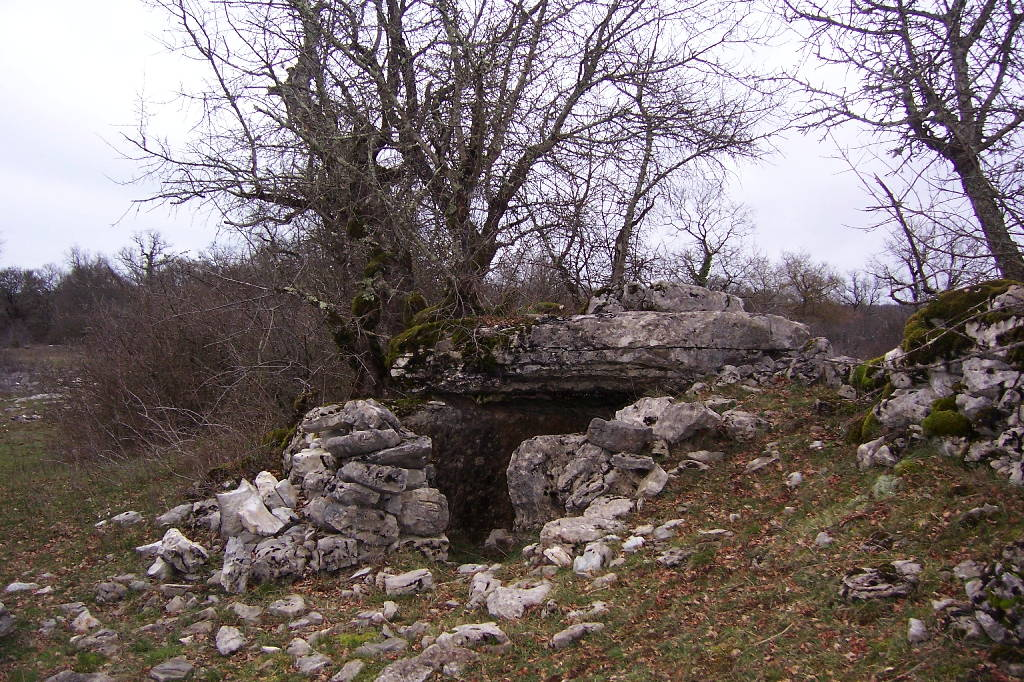
The Dolmen of Garivals

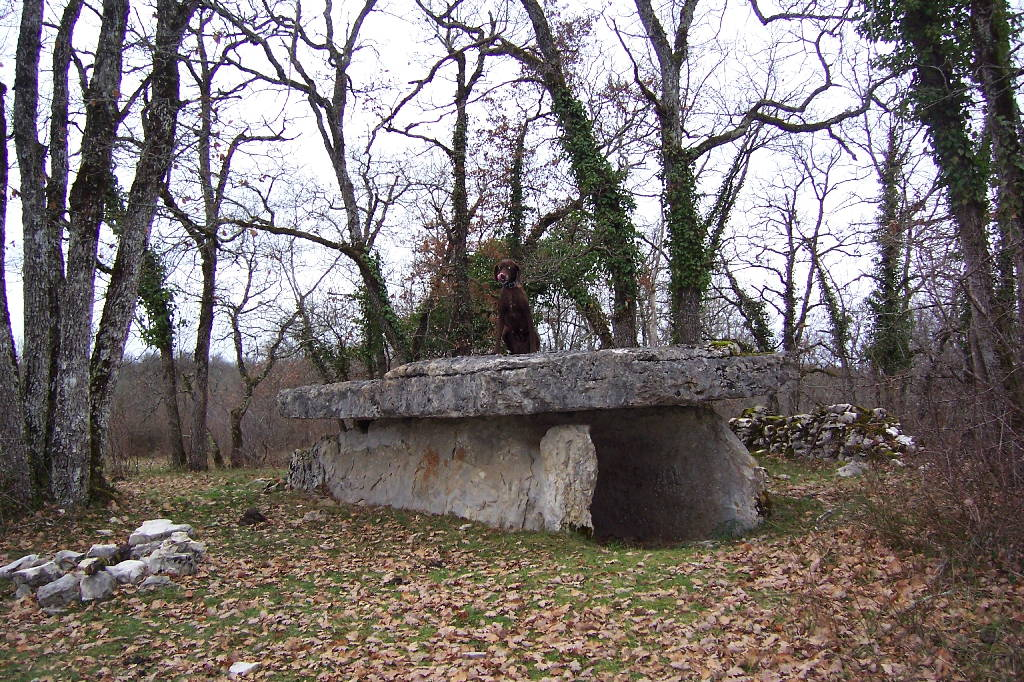
The Table de Roux

=== The Fortified Town ===
In the Middle Ages Assier had the appearance of a fortified camp: a village surrounded by a defensive wall. Of the first feudal castle only the Tour de Sal (Sal Tower) remains. Outside the walls there were extended suburbs called barry: barry de Mons, barry des Sal, barry de las botas, barry des leygue, and barry del Torria. Assier had the Abbot of Figeac as their Lord and it was attached to the Order of St. John of Jerusalem though some hamlets such as Vialan depended on the Hospital of Issendolus.

From the 13th century the Assier community had the right to elect consuls. Every year on the first Sunday of September, all heads of household paid tax to one or more elected consuls.

=== The Commandery of Assier ===
Around 1280, the Knights of the Order of St. John of Jerusalem founded a commandery. It was a donation by Barasc who owned part of the lordship of Assier. It included: a fortified house, a church dedicated to St. Peter, a hospital on the site of the Chateau of Galiot de Genouillace, a leprosarium at a place called Malaudie on the road to Reyrevignes.

List of Knights and Priests of the Order of St. John of Jerusalem who were tax collectors in Assier:

- 1280: Pierre de Canis
- 1291: Jean de Cazalis
- 1299: Rotan de Montal who bought the domain of Mons
- 1322: Helie de Lavalette, commander of Assier
- 1336: Helie de Calston or Calvet, commander of Assier
- 1342: Jordan de Chaldayrac, commander of Assier
- 1344: Brother Pierre Marquès, Rector of Assier
- 1398: Brother Hugue Benson, Rector of Assier
- 1405: Brother Pierre Robert, Rector of Assier
- 1470-1490 Brother Hugo de Goles, Prosecutor of the commander of Le Bastit
- 1501: Jean de Valon, commander of Assier, Cras, and Le Bastit who united Assier and Bastit

=== The Hundred Years War ===
1365: France after the Treaties of Brétigny and Guérande Territory ceded by France to England by the Treaty of Brétigny

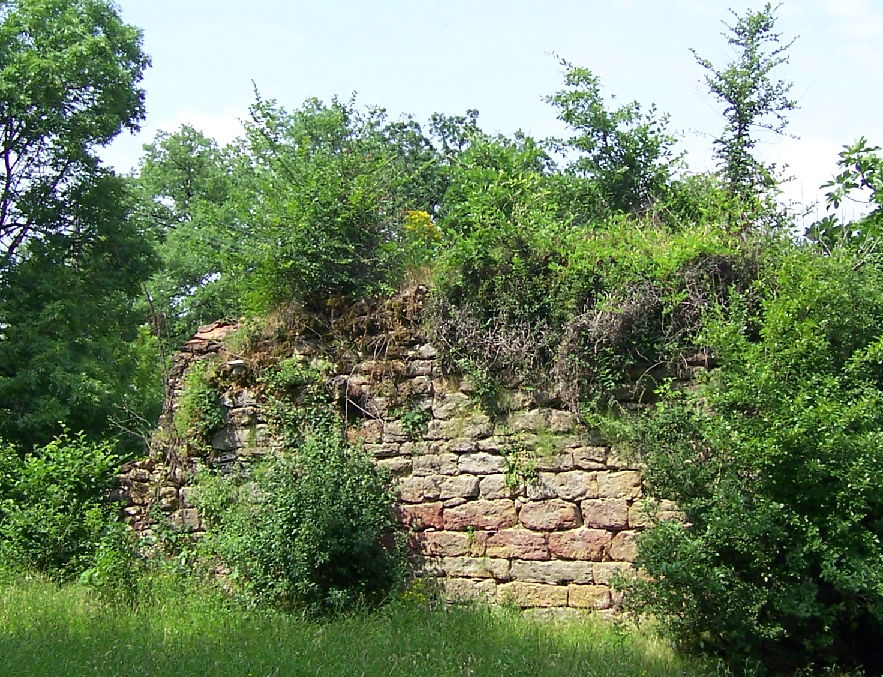
The ruins of the Tour de Maroc at a place called La Garénie, was a hideout for Bassorat during the Hundred Years War.

From 1355, the entire Quercy region became a theatre of struggle during the Hundred Years War. The Black Prince and his English troops invaded the south-west and Quercy. After the French defeat at the Battle of Poitiers, the Treaty of Brétigny gave England the Guyenne and Gascony. The region was unstable because all the lords did not rally to the King of England.

Armed gangs were active for the English or on their own account. They robbed, ransomed, and massacred the population. One of these bands, under the orders of Bassorat, had their hideout at the Tour de Marot or the Tour de Maroc at a place called La Garénie. Bassorat ravaged the country until 1395 when he left for Spain. The English left the region around 1450.

Assier and its surroundings were ruined, it had to repopulate the country by bringing families from Auvergne, Rouergue, and elsewhere by providing favourable conditions. During this calmer period of 1450–1547 the church and the chateau were built. Many workers and tradesmen came and agriculture grew.

=== The Lords of Assier ===
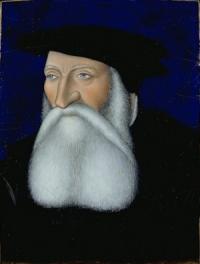
Galiot de Genouillac Lord of Assier and Grand Master of Artillery of France

From the 12th century the first lords mentioned were called the Rigaud d'Assier. One member of this family was pastor of Toulouse Cathedral and lived at the court of Pope John XXII. Some of his guests at his house in Avignon were involved in the 1317 plot against the Pope He was Bishop of Winchester from 1319 to 1323.

Raymond du Bosc, Lord of La Garénie became co-lord of Assier by marrying a Rigaud: Marguerite of Assier. One of his descendants, Augé du Bosc married Jeanne de Rassiols in 1439, Lady of Vaillac. Their daughter Catherine of Assier married Jean Ricard de Ginouillac in 1464. From their union Jacques Ricard Genouillace called Galiot de Genouillace was born in 1465 at the Chateau of Assier who had a brilliant military and diplomatic career. After his death in 1546 his body was repatriated and buried in a chapel of the Church of Assier in 1549. After the death of his son François in 1544 at the Battle of Cérisoles, his daughter Jeanne became his sole heir. She married Charles de Crussols d'Uzes, 9th Viscount of Uzes, in 1523. Widowed in 1543, she remarried the Palatine Prince Philip de Saim called Rhinegrave and converted to the Protestant religion. Their son, Jean de Beaudiné, was invited to the wedding of the future Henry IV and was killed in 1572 during the St. Bartholomew's Day massacre. Twenty years of turmoil shook the region. After the Edict of Nantes, Figeac, Cardaillac, and Assier were governed by the Protestants for 50 years.

Jacques de Crussol, heir to Jeanne Ricard de Ginouillac, converted to Catholicism. He was named duke and peer of France. In 1768 the 9th Duke of Uzes, François Emmanuel Crussol, sold the chateau to be demolished. The chateau and the lands left the founding family. The new co-lords of Assier were, until the French Revolution, Messrs Pouzalgue, Séguy, and Montal.

=== Contemporary era and recent past ===
==== The French Revolution in Assier ====
On 14 September 1788 Jean-Pierre Séguy, notary, bought the land of the Devèze d'Assier and became a co-lord of Assier. The French Revolution passed without major disorder: the main complaints concerned the redistribution of land. Jean-Pierre Séguy redistributed land he had bought to all the inhabitants of Assier present and future (from pregnant women) who each received 0.34 hectares. He was mayor of the commune from 1801 to 1827.

==== The first schools ====
Following the Guizot law communes had to have a public school. On 21 December 1834 the council appointed Jean-Pierre Bruel to run the school. He received two hundred francs per year as well as sums paid by the wealthiest families for the education of their children: 1 franc to learn to read, 1 franc 50 centimes for reading and writing, and 2 francs for mathematics. Twelve poor students were taught without charge.

In 1853, a free school for girls was headed by Marie Bessac (Sister Victoire) assisted by Jeanne Turenne (Sister Jeanne). They were paid by the commune. On 25 October 1858 Jean-Pierre Bruel died and Jean Delsériez succeeded him in 1859. In 1881 an assistant position was created as numbers then were 75 boys and 60 girls. A nursery for infants was created next to the girls' school: the cost was 1.5 francs per student per month. The position is given to Sister Jeanne Turenne. On 20 August the position of assistant to the boys' school was created.

In 1902 a secular girls' school opened. In 1905 schooling was compulsory and free for all children over five years. In 1926, the municipal council protested against the abolition of the post of Assistant for the Public School. In 1957 construction began on a new school for Assier.

==== Fight against poverty ====
During the mandates of Antoine Pezet and Joseph Carbonel from 1848 to 1870 many decisions were taken to improve the lot of the poorest:

- In 1849, funding from the office of charity;
- In 1851, buying a house for school and free for the poor;
- In 1853, funding for private schools;
- In 1856, a tax of two centimes per inhabitant to buy medicines distributed free to the poor and the creation of a charity workhouse for able-bodied poor;
- In 1857 there were more beggars in the town. The council decided on a special tax of 15 cents per franc to help the disabled in the commune;
- In 1867, the teacher, Mr. Delsyriez, was encouraged by the council to teach classes for adults;
- In 1869, a contribution of three centimes for the supply of medicines to the poor.

==== Technical progress ====
===== The railway =====
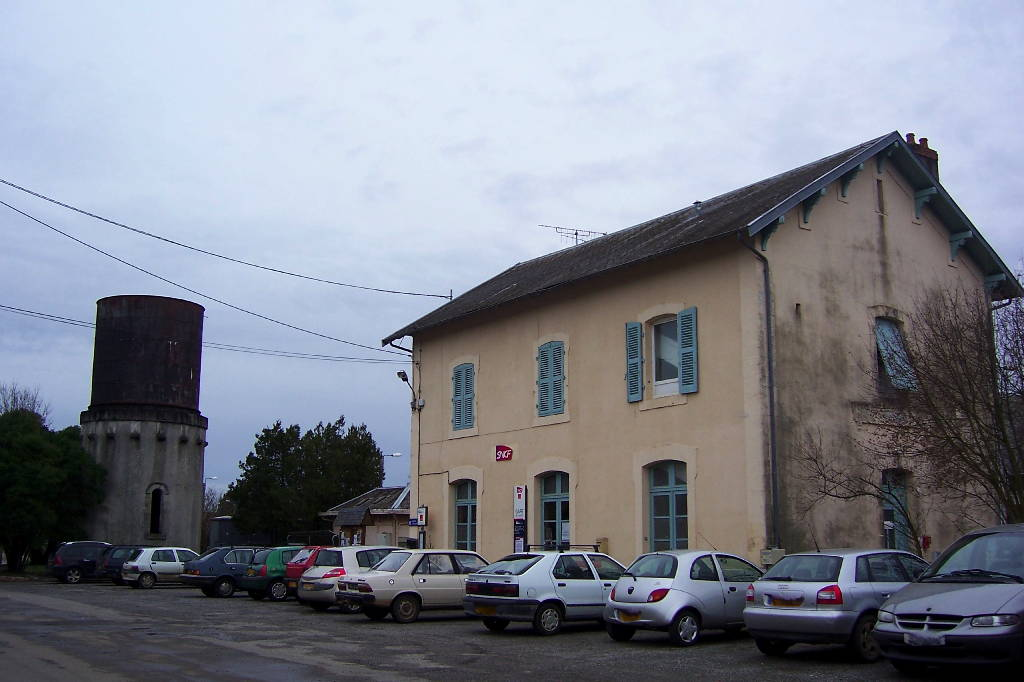
Assier railway station and water tower

In 1854 two rail projects passing through Assier were considered then abandoned. A Classification yard was to have been located in the commune and there were plans to build a hotel-restaurant with 16 rooms near the proposed route of the line. This is the large isolated house at a place called Frejayrie, one kilometre from the centre of Assier.

In 1860, the Compagnie du chemin de fer de Paris à Orléans started building the Brive-Rodez line passing through Assier station. Four fatal accidents occurred in the commune which killed a navvy and three workers. The line was opened in September 1862.

===== Other modes of travel =====
In 1905 and 1910 tramway projects were considered to serve Assier station and neighbouring communes: a line from Gourdon to Le Bourg via Quissac and Espédaillac. Soon, however, the car made its appearance. In 1923 the Municipal Council was required to limit the speed of cars to less than 15 km/h in the town centre. In 1925 the widow of Thimoté Gardou installed the first petrol pump and the commune received 200 francs per year. In 1932 buses ran between Assier and Cahors.

===== Electrification =====
On 11 October 1922 the council appointed a commission to study the connection of the village to a power grid. On 9 May 1926 appropriations for the establishment of a union for electrification were voted. On 30 October the mayors of Cardaillac, Fourmagnac, Fons, Reyrevignes, and Assier met and decided that the electric current should be supplied by the hydro-electric plant of Mr. Barrière located on the Drauzou but in 1927 the council denounced the agreement with Mr. Barrière on the grounds that his plant could not supply power permanently because the flow of the Drauzou was too irregular. In 1928 the commune had to pay a 225,000 franc fine for non-compliance with the agreement but appealed and was successful in 1932.

The commune then joined the electrification union of the north of Lot and, in 1930, the concession was given to the Bourbonnais company. The contract was signed on 19 February 1931 and on 17 April 1932 there was the inauguration and celebration of the electricity supply.

In the village the telephone and electricity lines have been buried since 1980.

===== Access to water =====
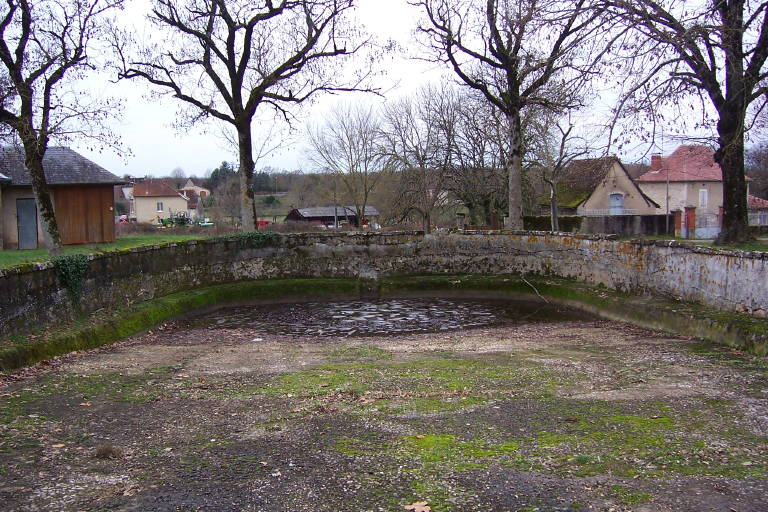
A watering hole dug on the Assier fairgrounds

Prior to 1962, the inhabitants of Assier accessed water through fountains or cisterns. There were shortages and supply was a constant concern of councils:

- On 10 May 1847 the council took the decision to widen the stream and establish a reservoir for watering livestock. It was also decided to dig ponds on the fairgrounds;
- In summer 1489, a serious drought deprived men and animals of water. The commune took the decision to line the Bournel pond;
- In 1860 the council took a loan of 1,100 francs to flush the stream and to build a Lavoir (Public laundry) and a trough. New investments were decided in 1871 and 1873;
- In 1874 the council bought a pump and rehabilitated 140 metres of pipe feeding the fountain of repose;
- In 1899 Mr. Léon Amouroux donated 5,000 francs to provide water from the Barade fountain to public places. The system, used from 1900 to 1962 and directed by Mr. Boisset, included cisterns in the church square at the foot of the chateau tower. It ended with a fire hydrant at the Bridge over the stream.
- In 1952, a severe drought necessitated the padlocking of pumps at certain times of day and night. Rachel Batut was designated and remunerated for this task.

=== Heraldry ===
Arms of Assier	Blazon: Chequey of Azure and Argent debruised by a bend of Or.

== Administration ==
List of Successive Mayors

From	To	Name	Party	Position
1793	1796	Jean-Pierre Capelle		President of the Communal Council
1796	1801	Jean-Pierre Adgié		President of the Communal Council
1801	1827	Jean-Pierre Séguy		Notary
1827	1828	Jean-Pierre Amouroux		Lawyer
1828	1830	Antoine Pouzalgue		Mayor by decree, Doctor
1830	1832	Antoine Pezet		Mayor by decree
1832	1837	Pierre Barrué		
1837	1846	Antoine Pezet		
1846	1848	Jean-Pierre Amouroux		
1848	1865	Antoine Pezet		
1865	1870	Joseph Carbonel		
1870	1878	Jean-Pierre Adgié		
1878	1908	Gabriel Murat		
1908	1910	Louis Doucet		
1910	1913	Léon Amouroux		
1913	1925	Antonin Carayol		
1925	1929	Léon Amouroux		
1929	1943	Prosper Colomb		
1943	1944	Jacques Murat		President of the Special Delegation
1944	1944	Jacques Nouaillac		President of the Special Delegation
1944	1944	Georges Hirondelle		President of the Liberation Committee
1944	1953	Prosper Colomb		
1953	1953	Louis Pélissier		
1953	1965	Raoul Bousquet		
1965	1977	Jean Labanhie		
1977	1983	Georges Hirondelle		
1983	1989	Paul Hug		
1989	2014	Jean Lafon		
2014	2020	Patrick Roques		
2020	2026	Maxime Hug		

== Demography ==
The inhabitants of the commune are known as Assiérois or Assiéroises in French. In 1620 there were 115 fires in Assier. In 1750 there were 500 communicants at Mass.

Historical population

Year	Pop.	±% p.a.
1793	660	—
1821	717	+0.30%
1846	776	+0.32%
1872	788	+0.06%
1901	736	−0.24%
1926	715	−0.12%
1946	661	−0.39%
1962	615	−0.45%
1968	557	−1.64%

Year	Pop.	±% p.a.
1975	512	−1.20%
1982	467	−1.31%
1990	533	+1.67%
1999	535	+0.04%
2007	678	+3.01%
2012	684	+0.18%
2017	651	−0.98%
2023	709	+1.43%

Source: EHESS and INSEE

== Economy ==
=== Agriculture ===
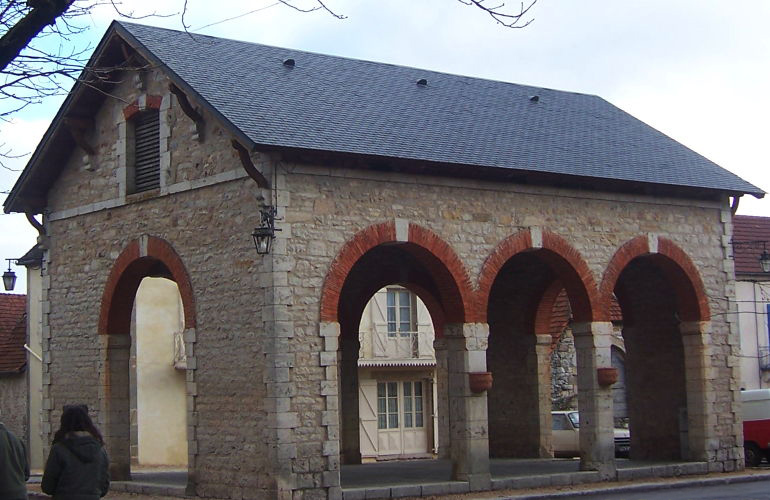
The Market Hall was built in 1884.

Assier is a rural community which had a dozen farms at the end of the 20th century. Operators abandoned polyculture (cereals and fruit trees) to turn to the production of meat and milk. 95% of the Limargue land is exploited, 20% of the land on the plateau is for sheep while the remaining 80% is left fallow.

Fairs were very important up to the 19th century and equalled those of Figeac and Gramat. A market hall was built in 1884 for the sale of cereals, chestnuts, apples and nuts. These products declined in the 20th century as a result of evolution in transport, the mechanisation of farms, and trading by the farmer. Since 1968 the council has taken steps to revive the market for sheep. In 1980 studies were carried out for the implementation of a covered sheep market which was inaugurated in July 1997 in the industrial zone. It trades between 1,500 and 2,000 animals every Monday.

Assier has a cattle market and an agricultural cooperative.

=== Trades, services, and crafts ===
Many shops and services are available on the town: butchers, bakers, a Pâtisserie, a bar, hairdressers, restaurants, a florist, and a grocery store; as well as tradesmen: roofers, carpenters, electricians, plumbers, heating, and a taxi.

A pharmacy is located in the town centre.

=== Industrial area ===
A company making high quality walnut veneers is established in the industrial zone.

The cooperative society Scop O'Chêne was established at Assier as part of its expansion. It manufactures building frames: structures used as assembly modules, and wood furnishings. It had 7 employees in 2009.

== Culture and heritage ==
=== Civil heritage ===
Assier has a number of buildings and structures that are registered as historical monuments:

- Old Dovecote at the Chateau (1537)
- The Grange de Bargues (16th century)
- The Dolmen in the Bois des Bœufs
- The Chateau (16th century)

The Chateau contains a number of items that are registered as historical objects:

- The Tomb of Anne de Genouillac (16th century)
- 3 Paintings: Allegorical compositions with notable people (17th century)
- 13 Paintings: Trophies (18th century)
- A Door (16th century)
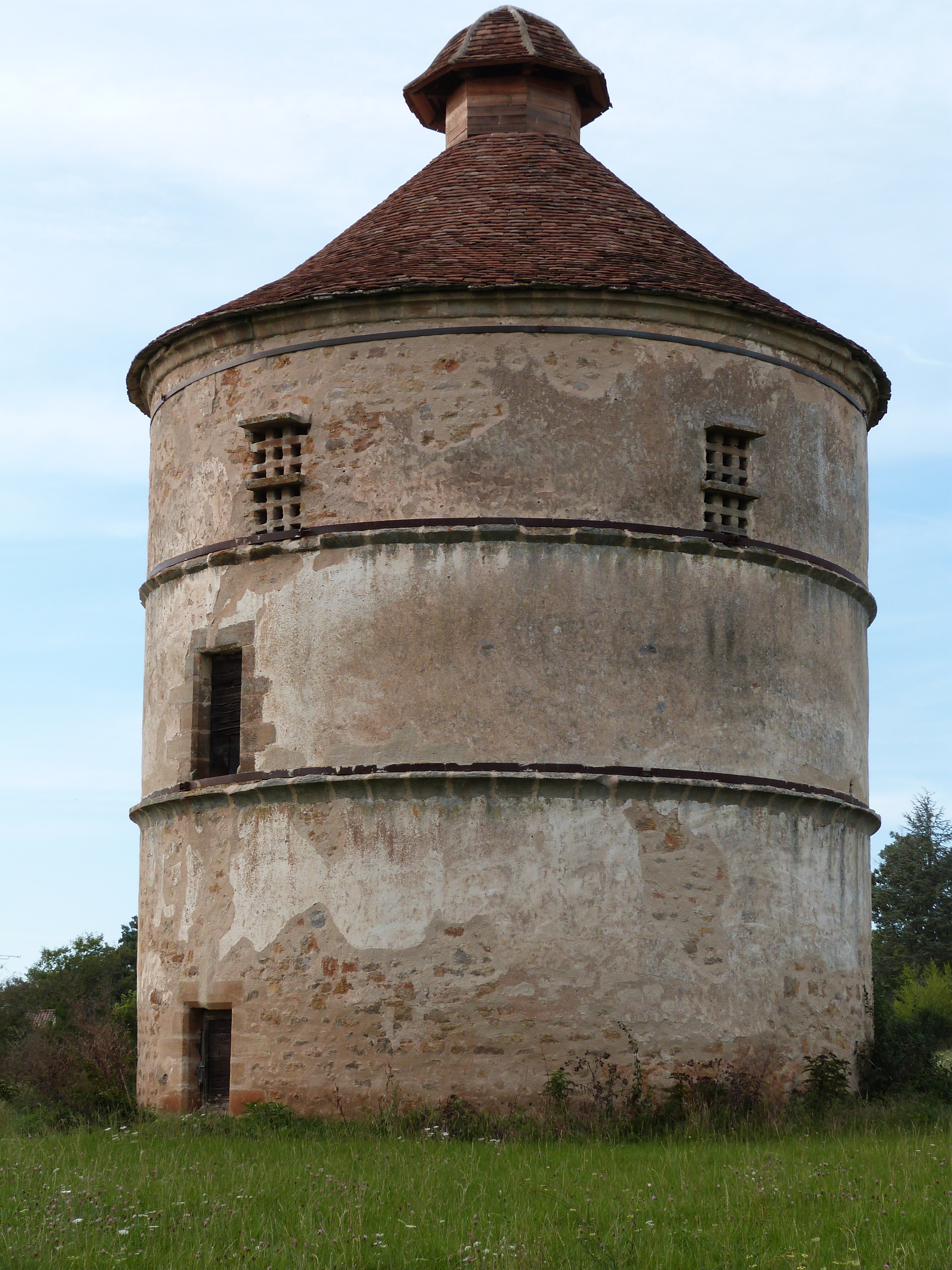
Old Dovecote at the Chateau

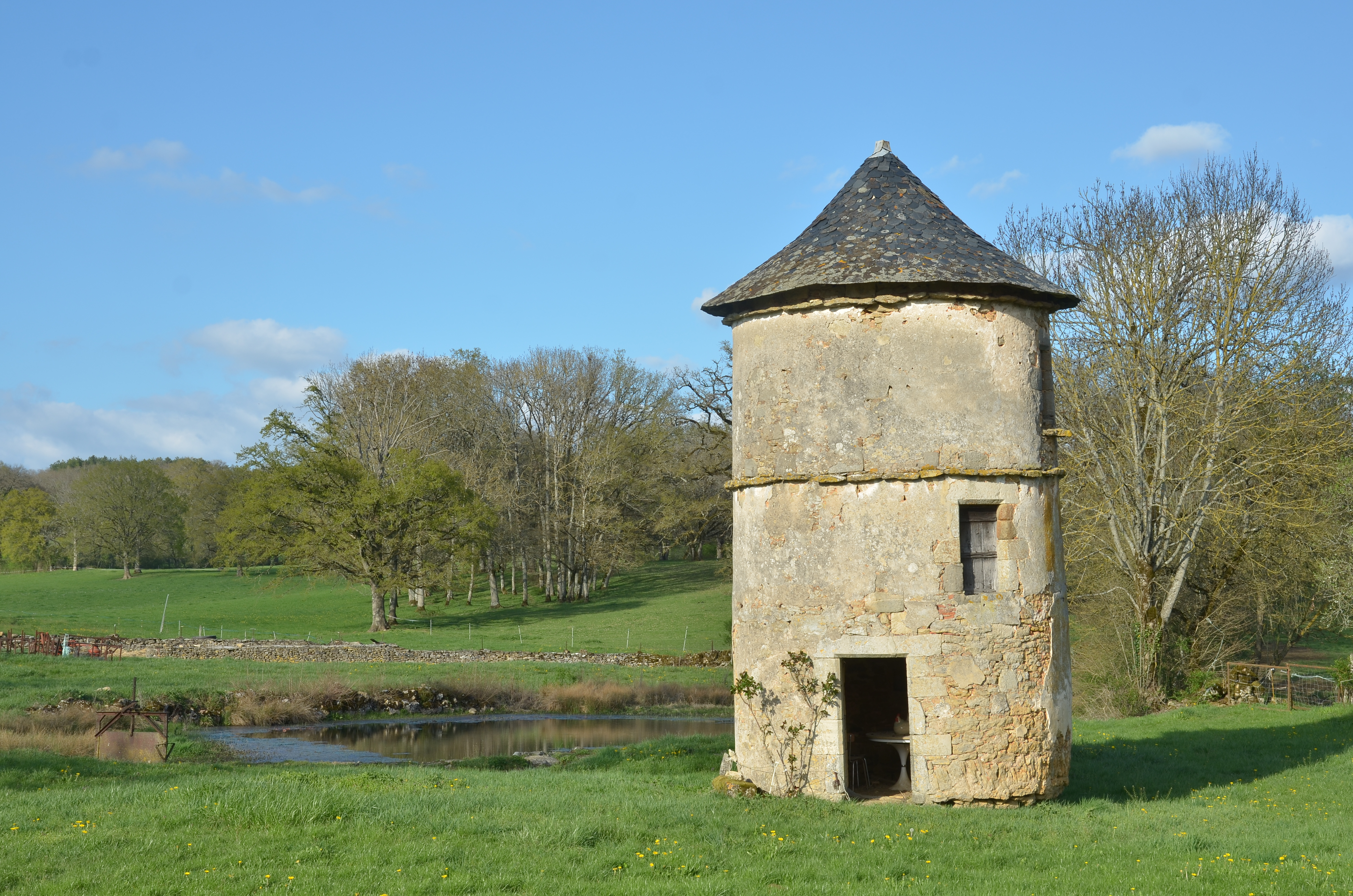
A Dovecote at Mons on the site of the old Commandery

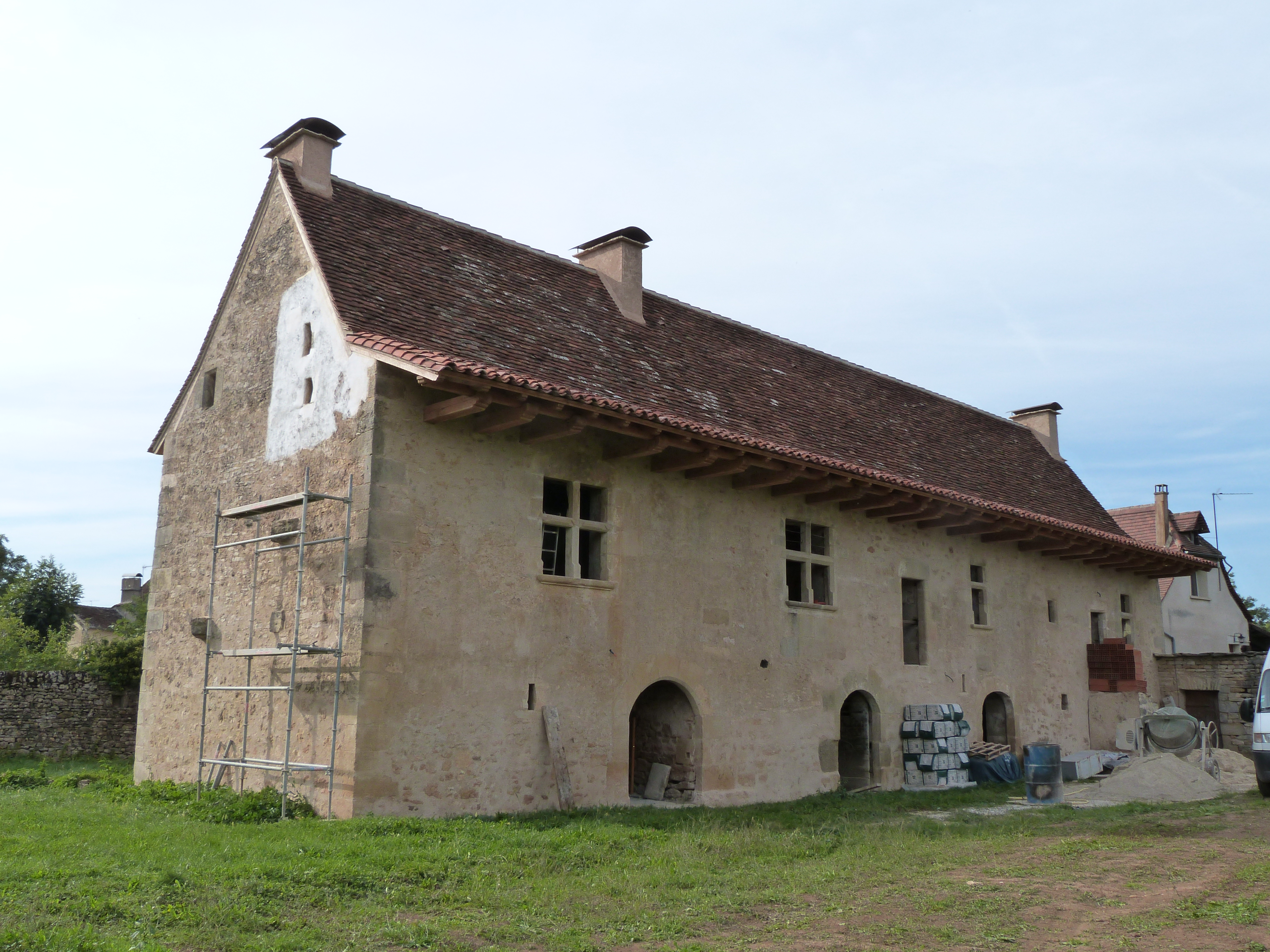
The Grange de Bargues

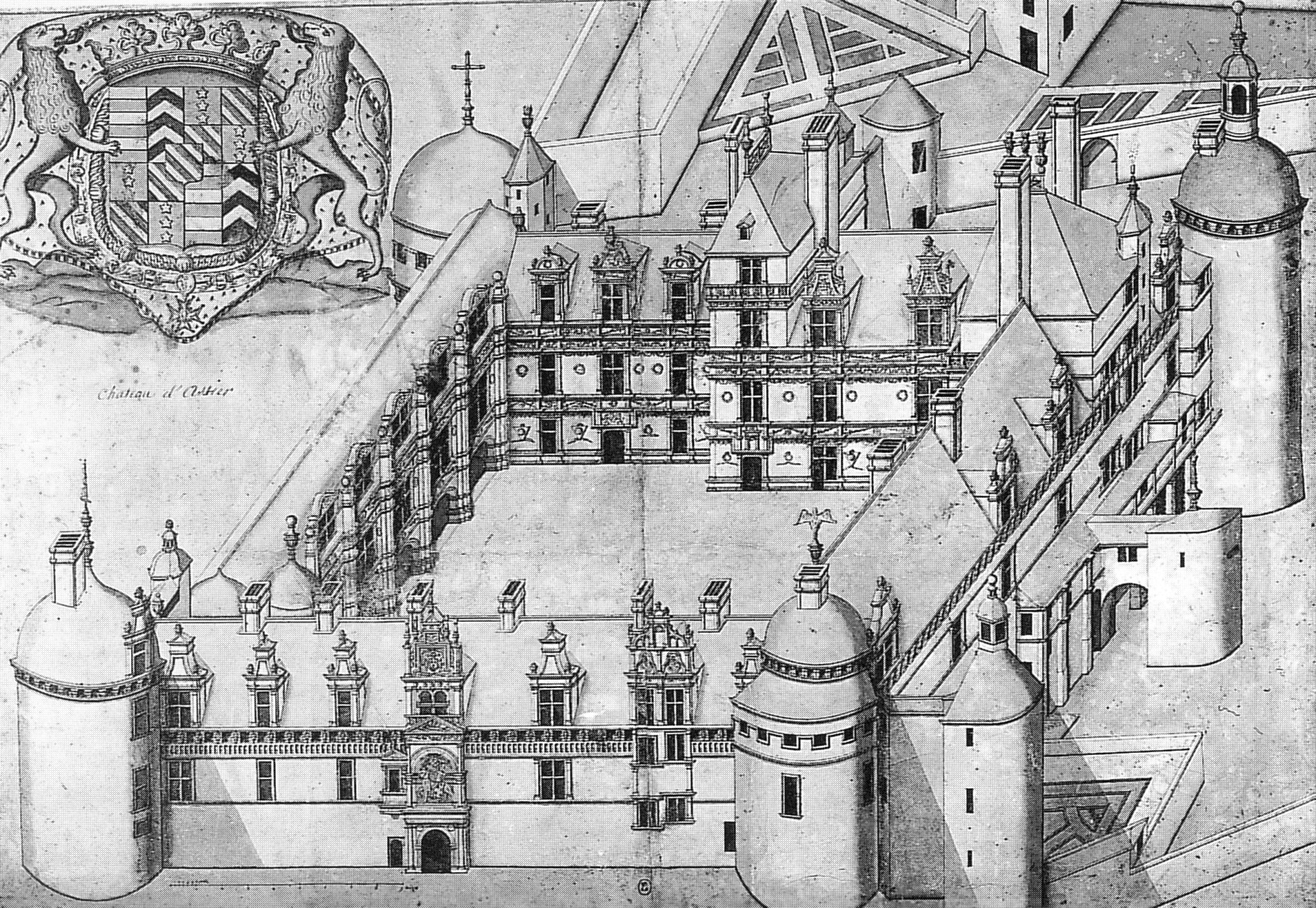
Plan of the Original Chateau

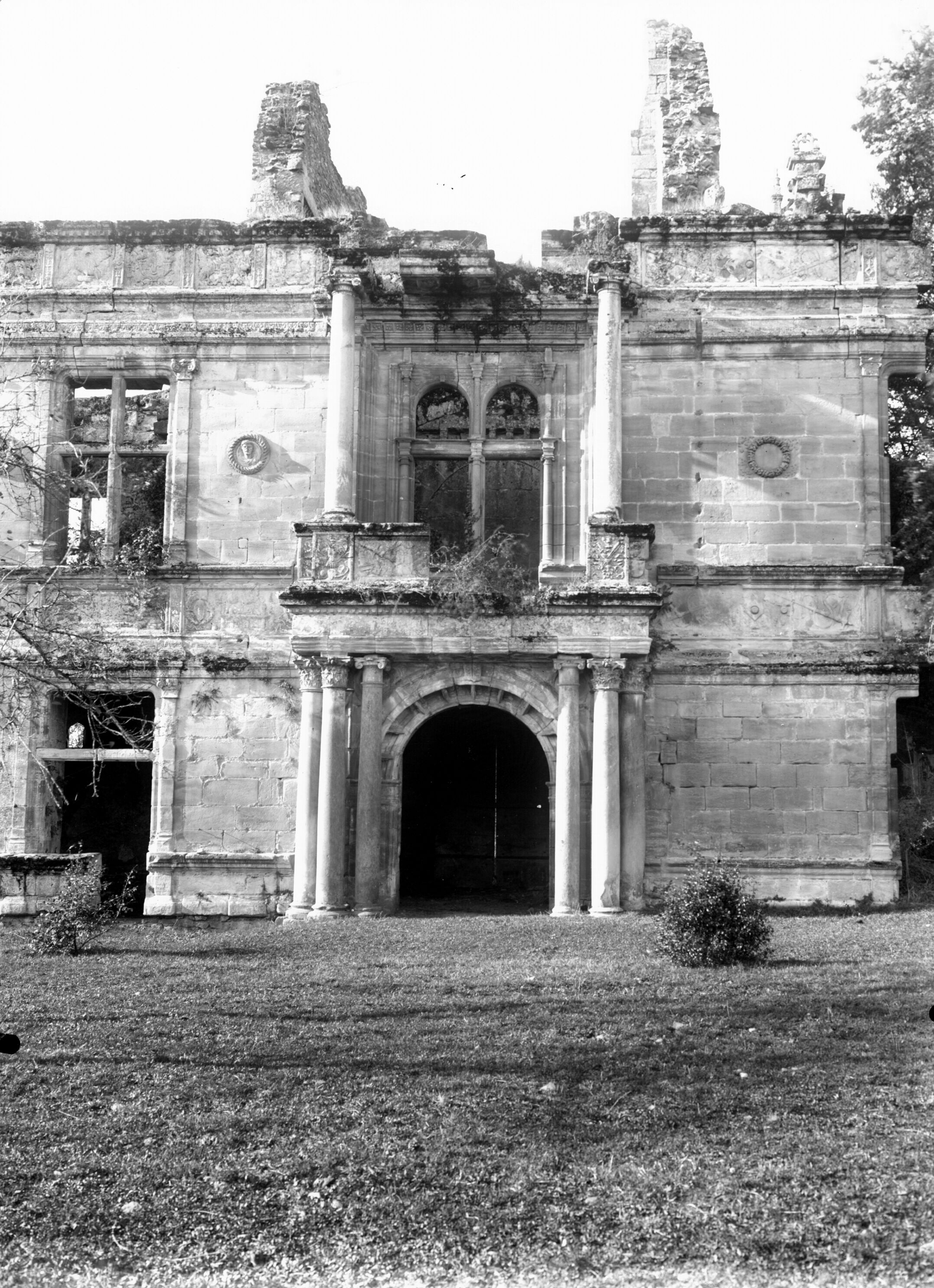
The Chateau by Eugène Trutat in 1899

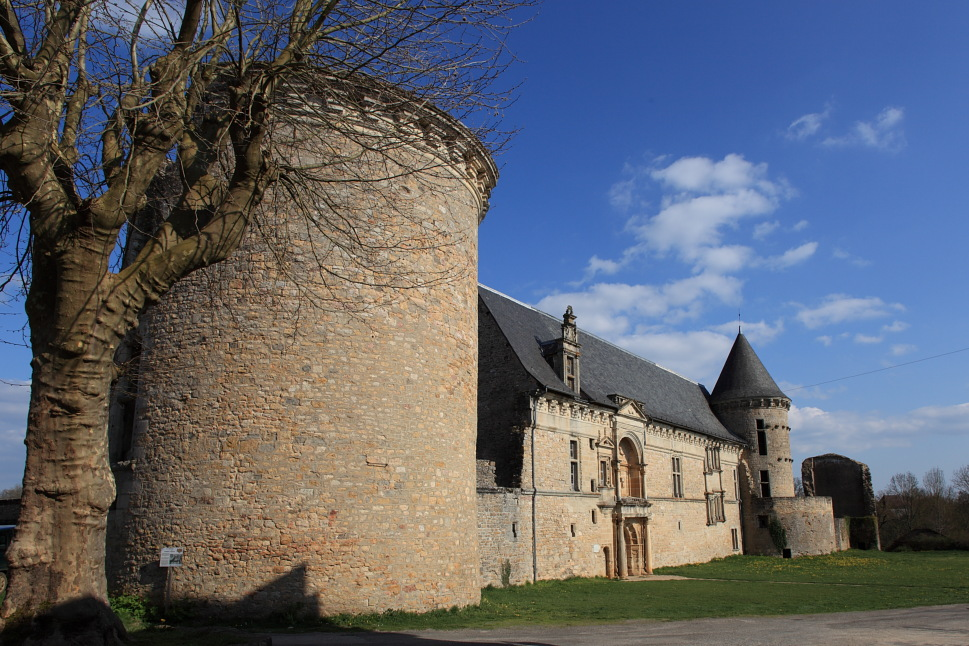
View of the chateau

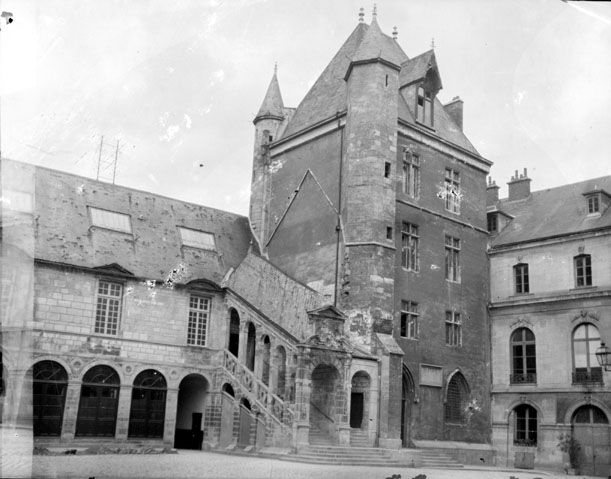
Inside courtyard of the Chateau

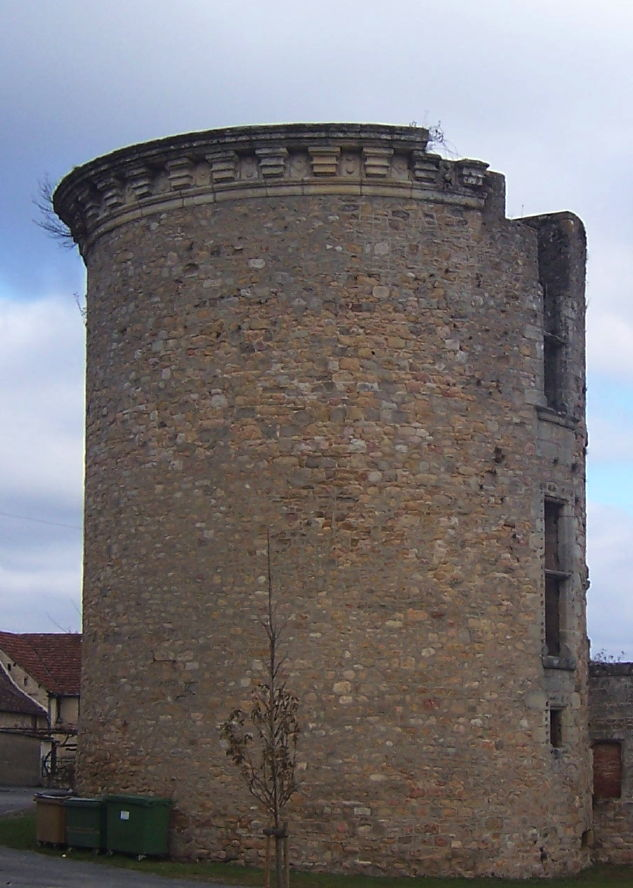
The Chateau tower

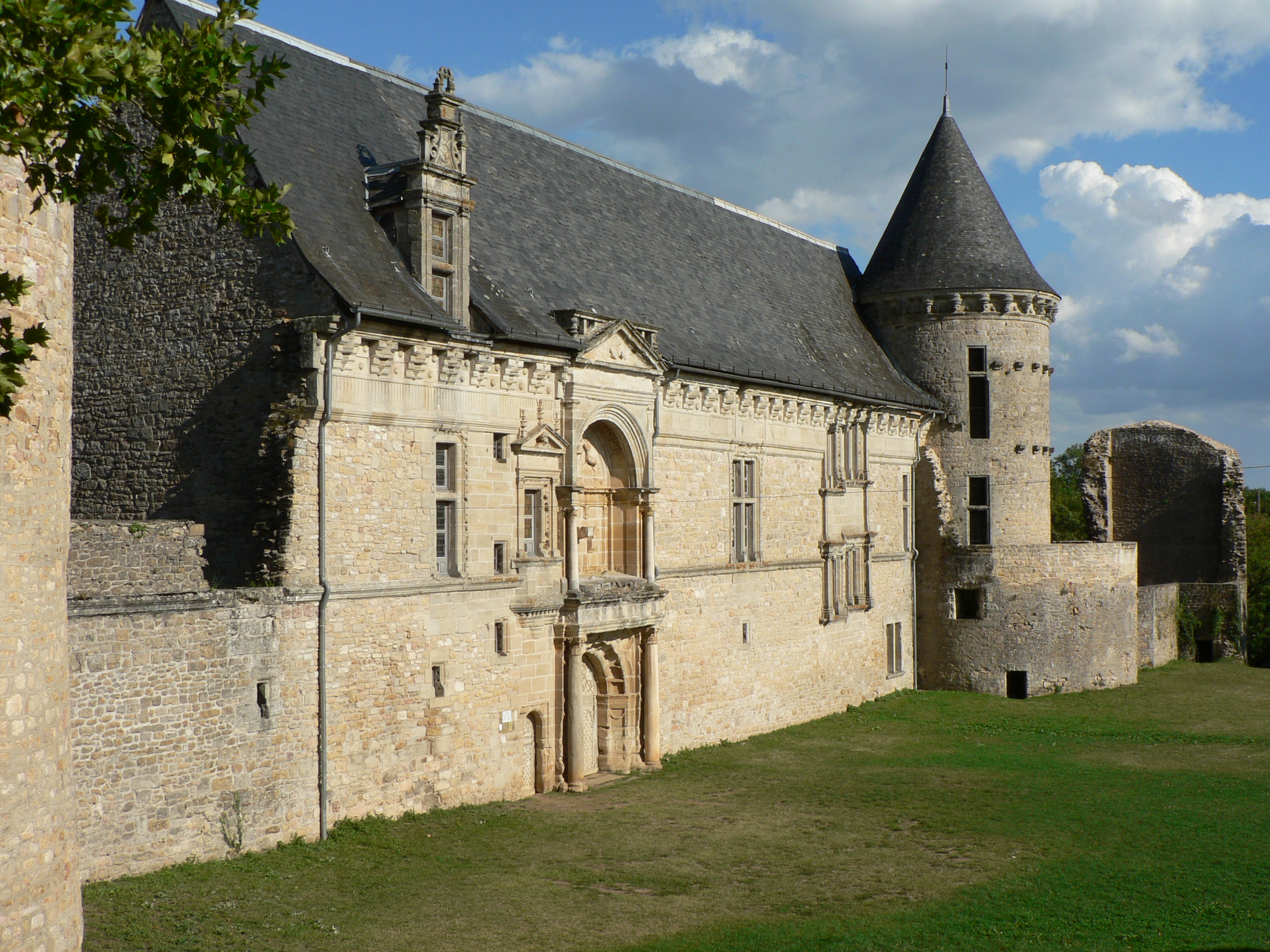
The Facade of the Chateau

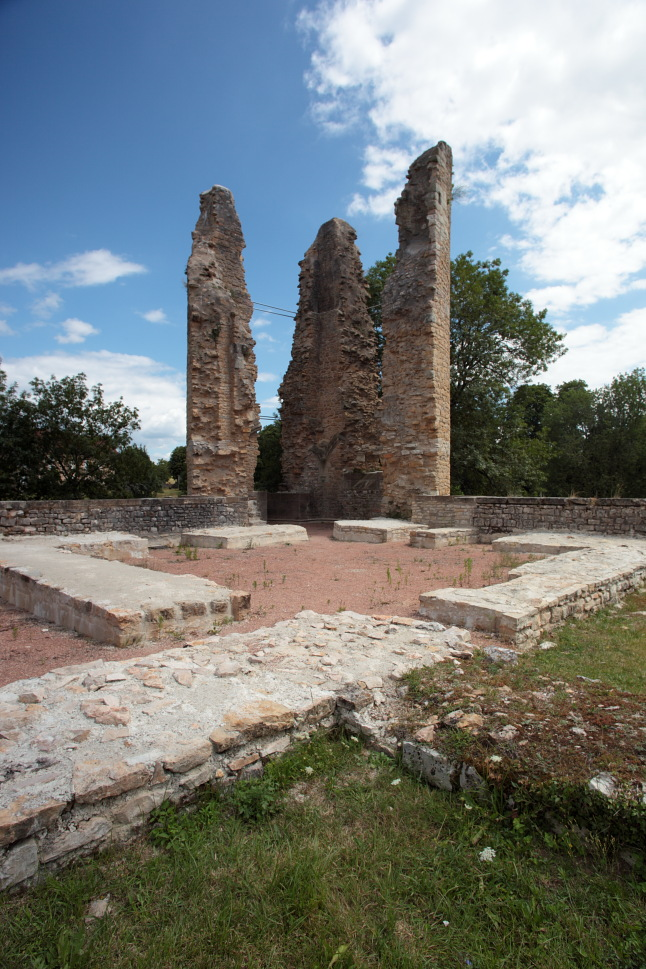
Remains of the Chateau

=== Religious heritage ===
The Church of Saint-Pierre is the only Renaissance religious building in Lot. Begun in 1540 and completed in 1549 the church is in monumental style and solely dedicated to the glory of Galiot de Genouillace with his reclining statue and the epitaph "After death, good name remains".

An outer frieze in low relief surrounds the monument. This profane and warlike decoration is unusual on a religious building. Galiot de Genouillace saw the church as a monument housing his tomb and that of his descendants. The grounds evoke scenes of war with Italy in the passage through the Alps before the victory of the Battle of Marignano.

Jean Bergue remarked in his 1987 study that this artistic and historical masterpiece has visibly deteriorated over a hundred years.

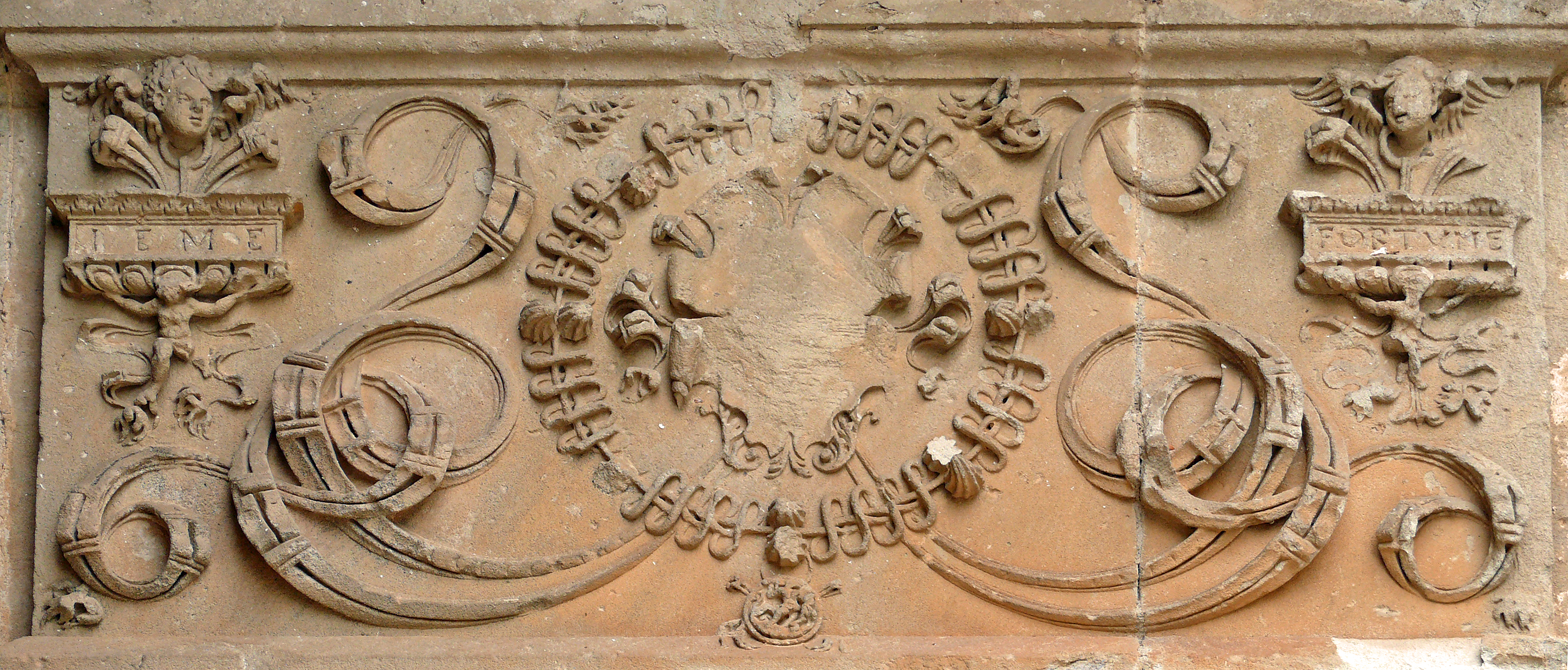
Frieze over the Chapel door

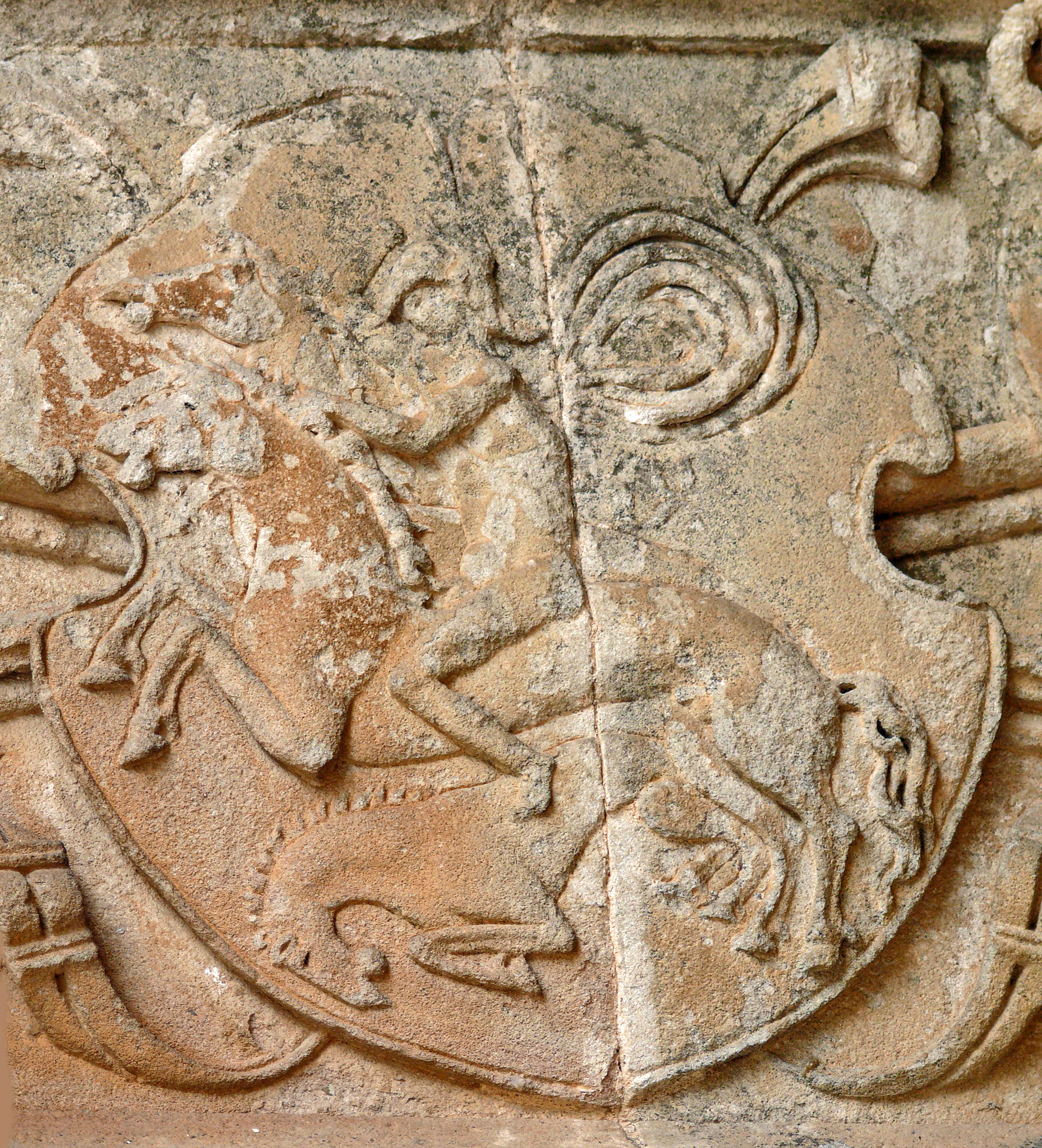
Frieze depicting the emblem of the Captain of 25 lances

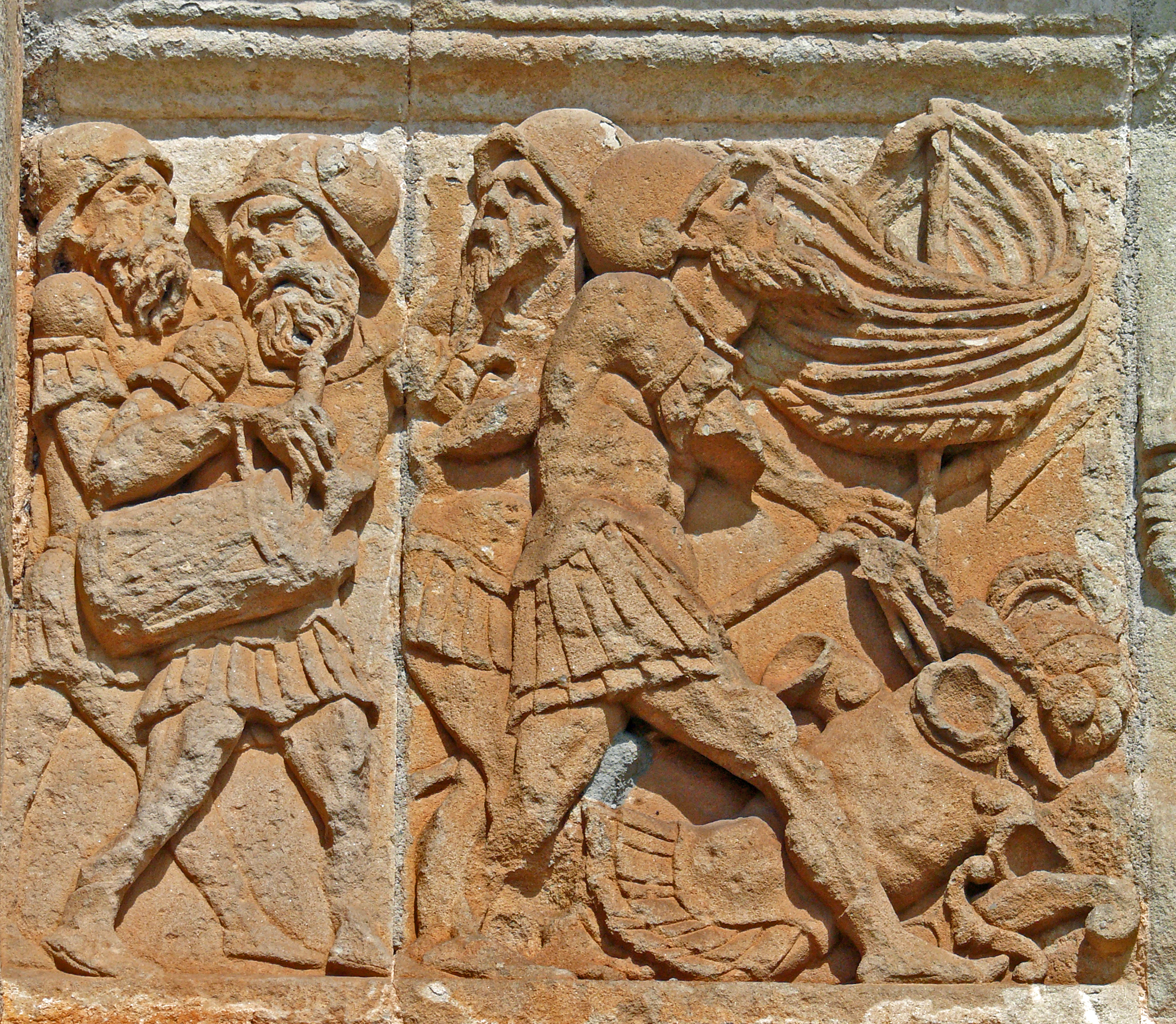
Frieze depicting ancient combat

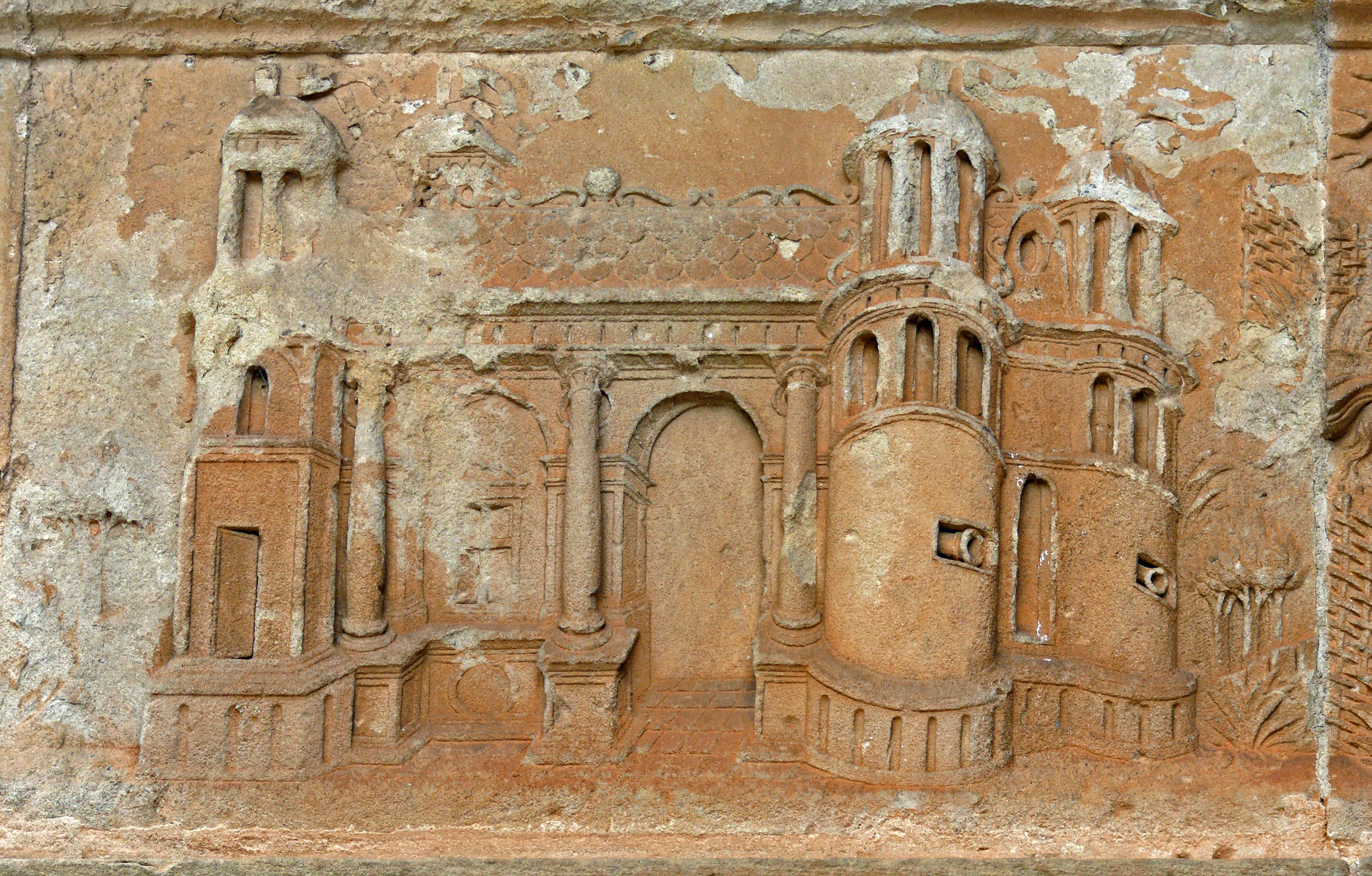
Frieze depicting the door to the town

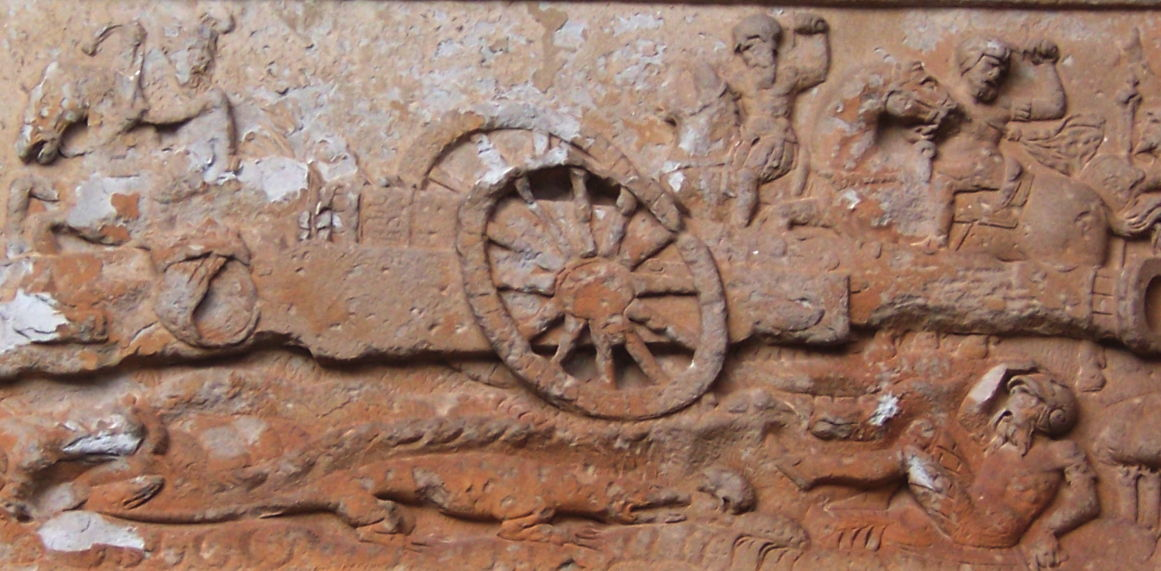
Detail showing a cannon

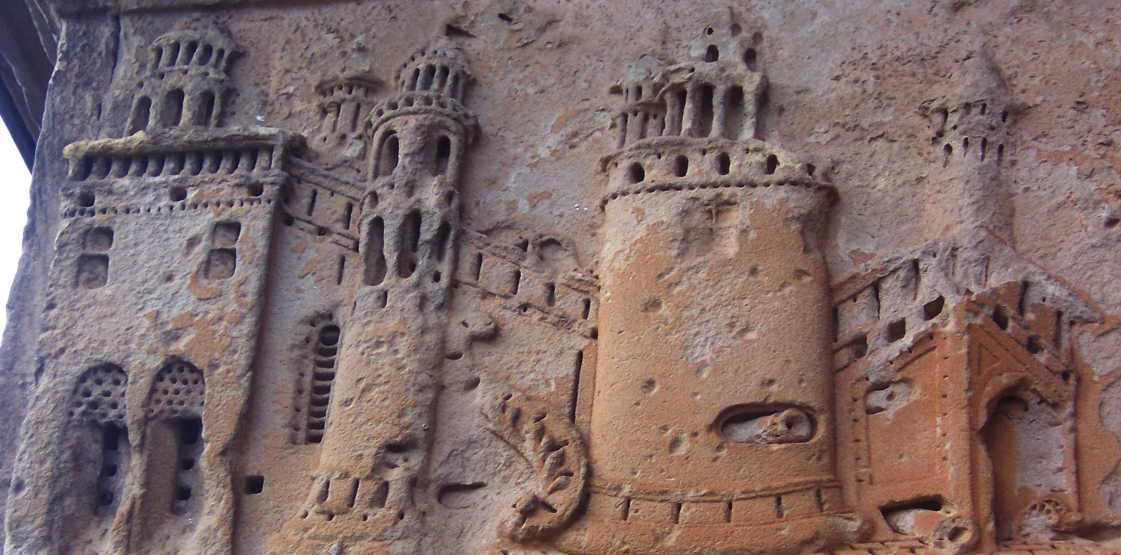
Detail showing a château

The sculptural elements depict the triumph of artillery, with the cannon serving as the most prevalent theme. It features detailed depictions, details-including the bastard culverin, palace sieges, round shot with three flames, ancillary parts of a detailed prediction that make this frieze a true archival document on the art of war at the time with no equivalent.

There are swords with a Fleur-de-lis Baldric recalling the charge by the Grand Squire of France next to the collar of the Order of St. Michael which was the highest distinction of the time.

There is a Funeral Chapel north of the first bay of the nave. It contains the tomb of Galiot de Genouillace who is represented on the marble reclining statue in court dress and then in armour leaning on a cannon and surrounded by bullets and bags of gunpowder.

The vault of this chapel is quite remarkable and unique in France: there is only one other example of this architecture in Europe - the monastery of San Domingo at Valencia in Spain. Both have a vault and a dome with triple ribs and Lunettes which give the impression of a star with a complicated design or a huge spiderweb canvas in which it is thought the final cut to size of some stones was performed after laying.

The Church of Saint Pierre contains three items which are registered as historical objects:

- The Tomb of Gailliot de Genouillac (16th century)
- Commemorative plaque (16th century)
- Enclosure of the Chapel of Galliot de Genouilhac (16th century)
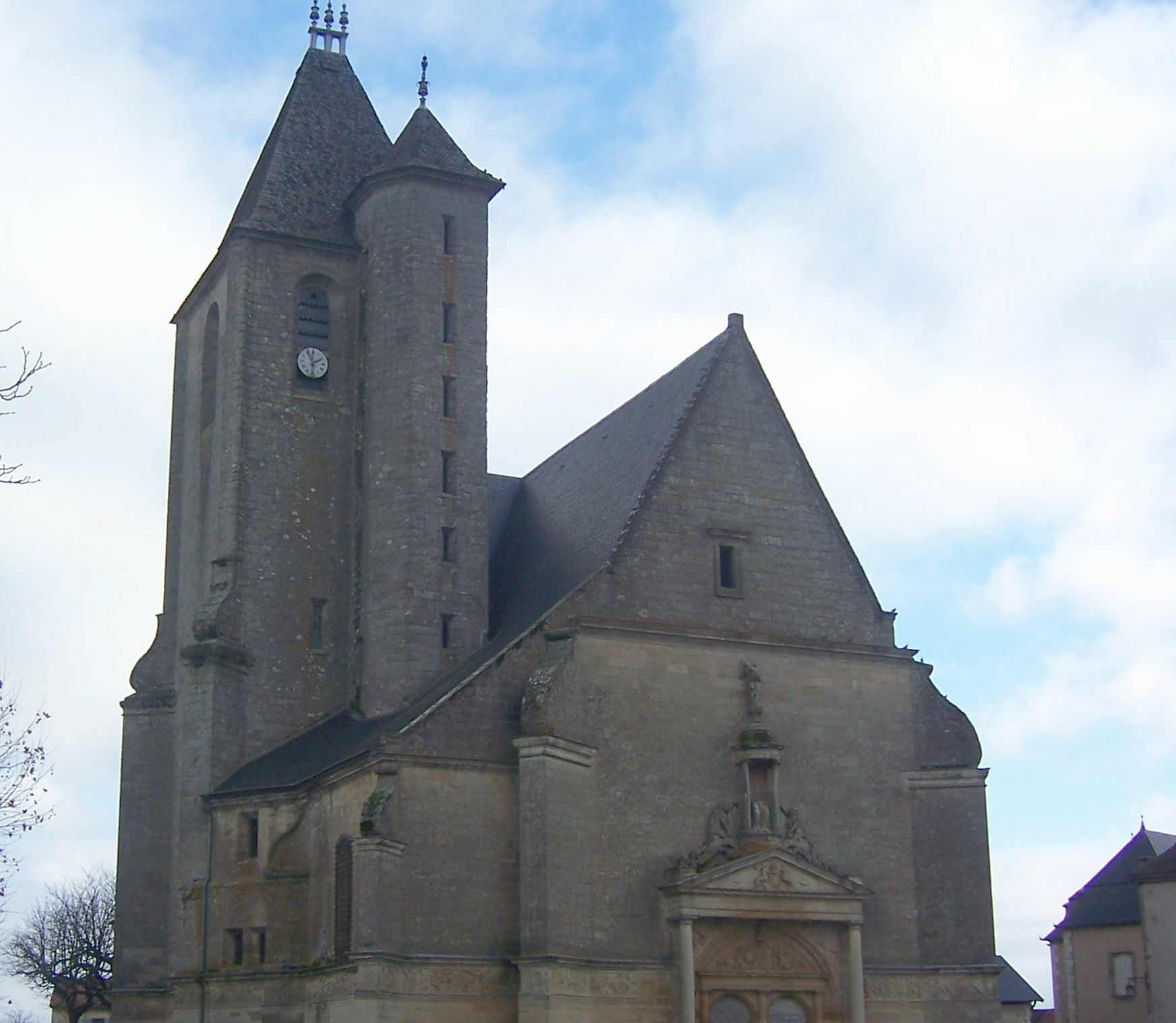
The Church of Saint-Pierre

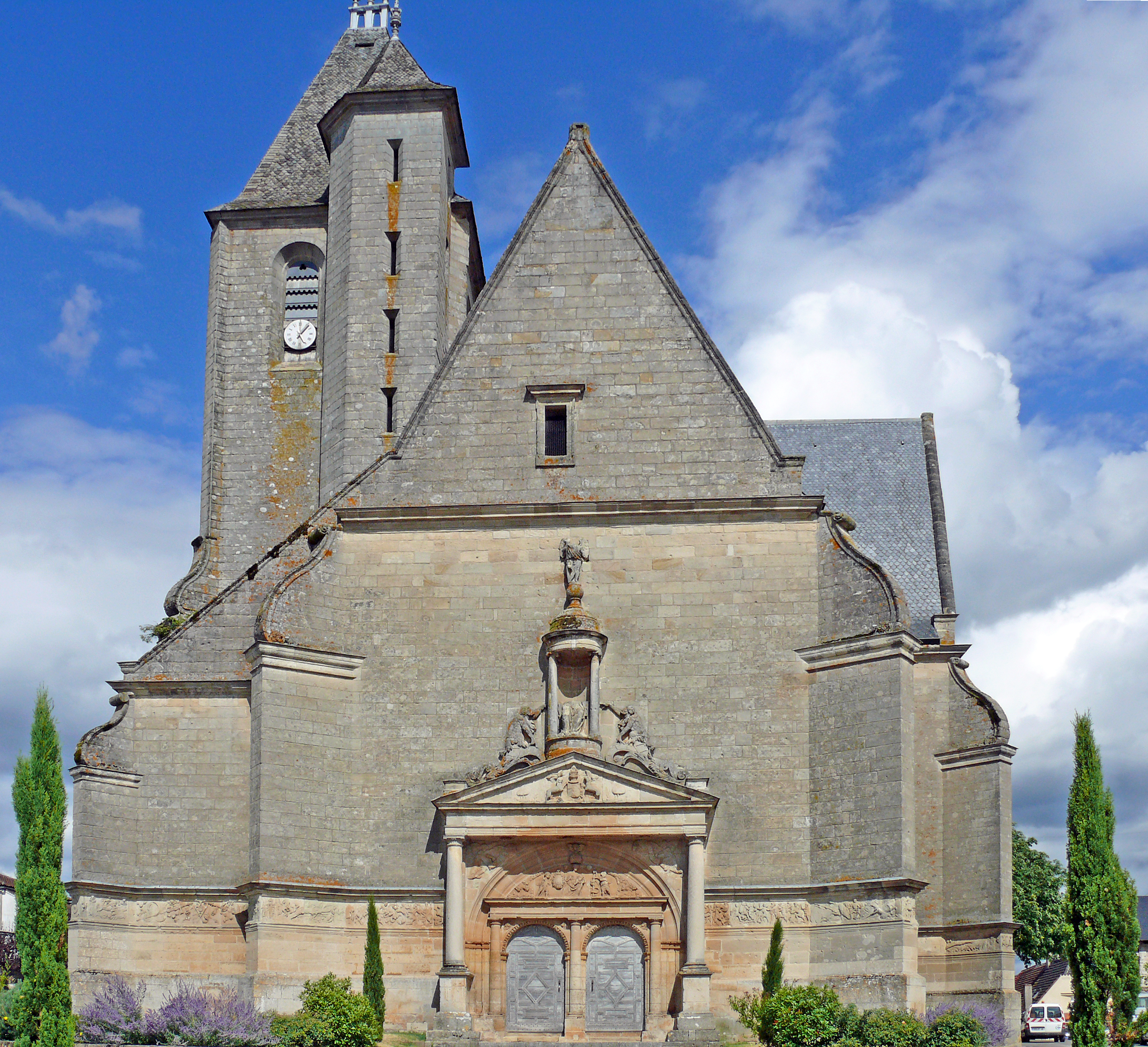
South side of the church

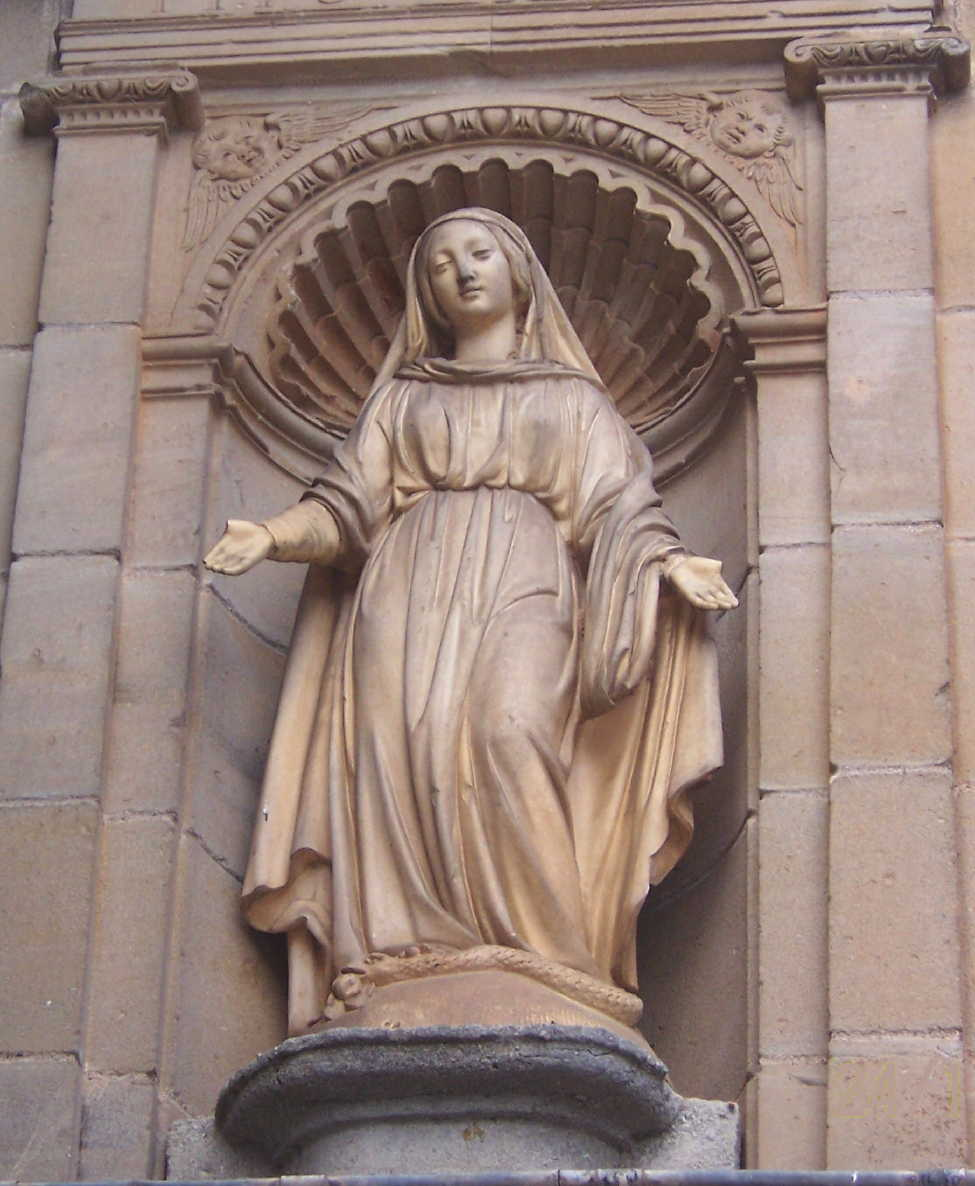
Statue in a niche on the side of the church

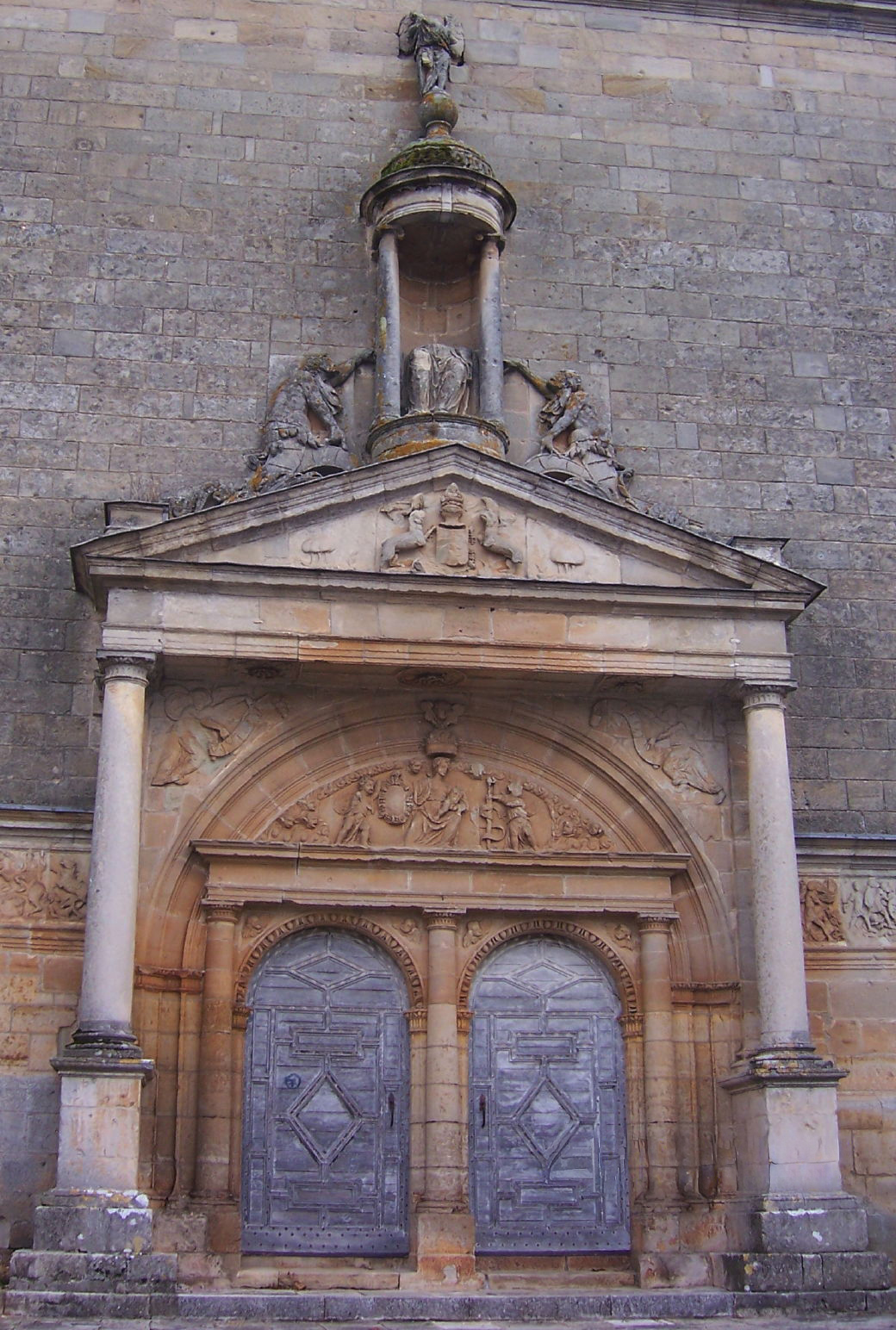
Entrance to the church

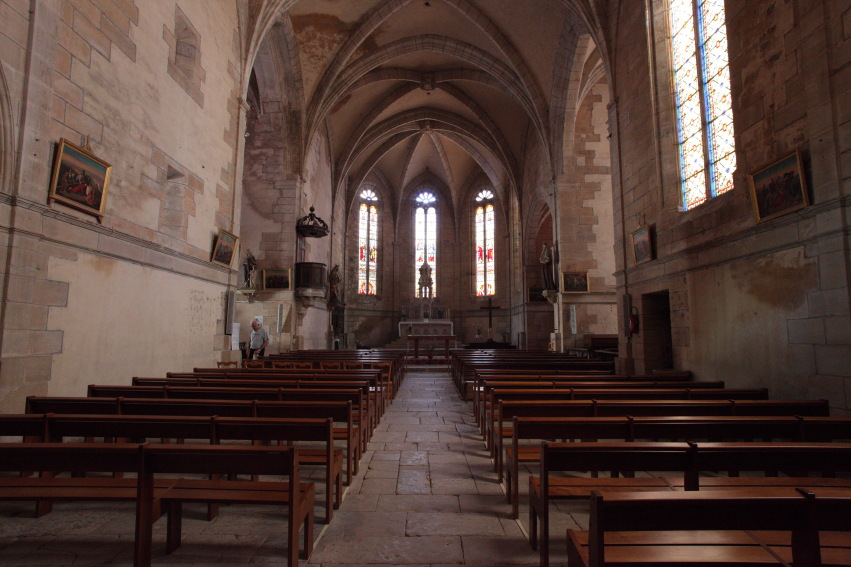
Inside the church

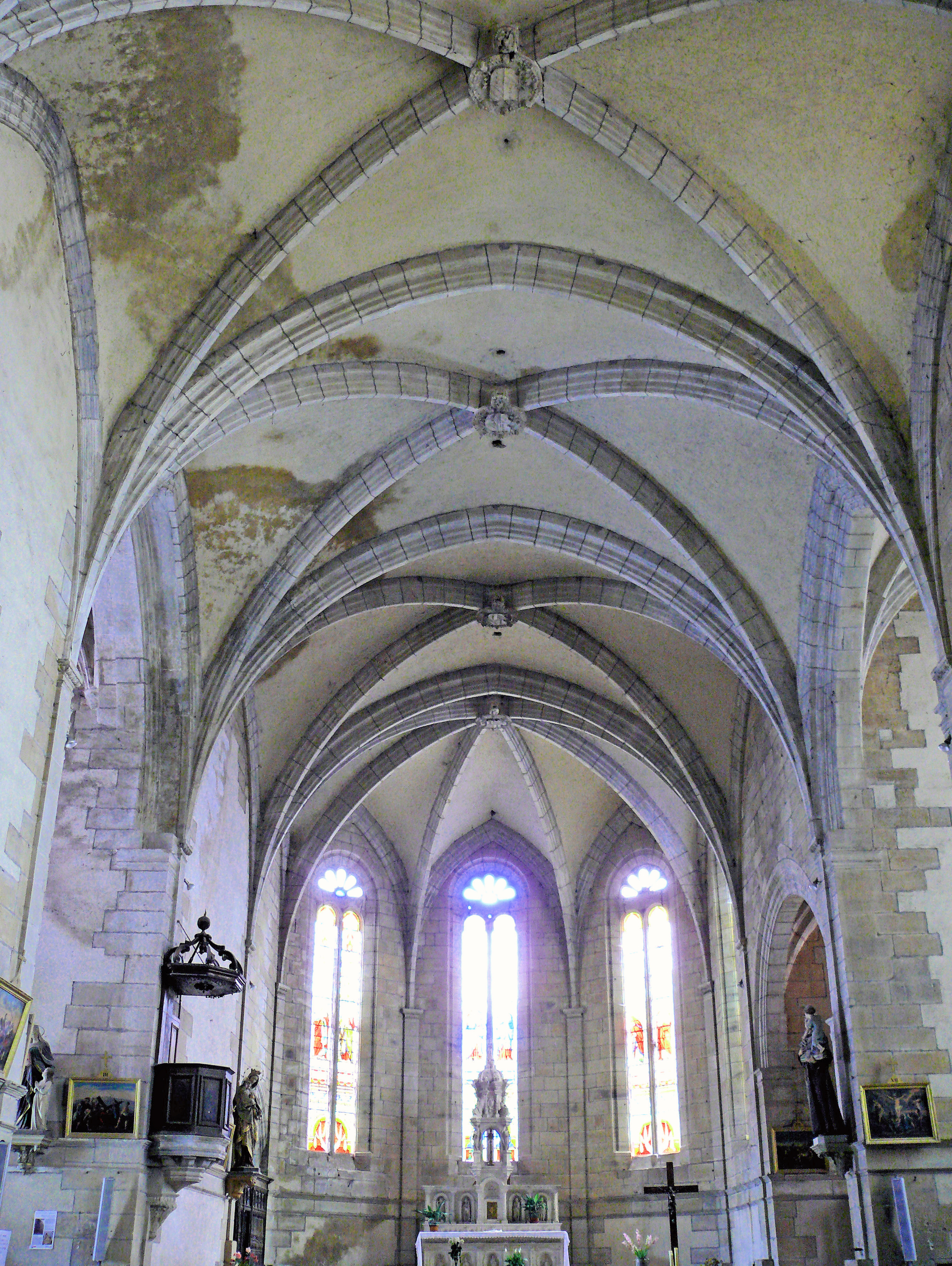
The Nave

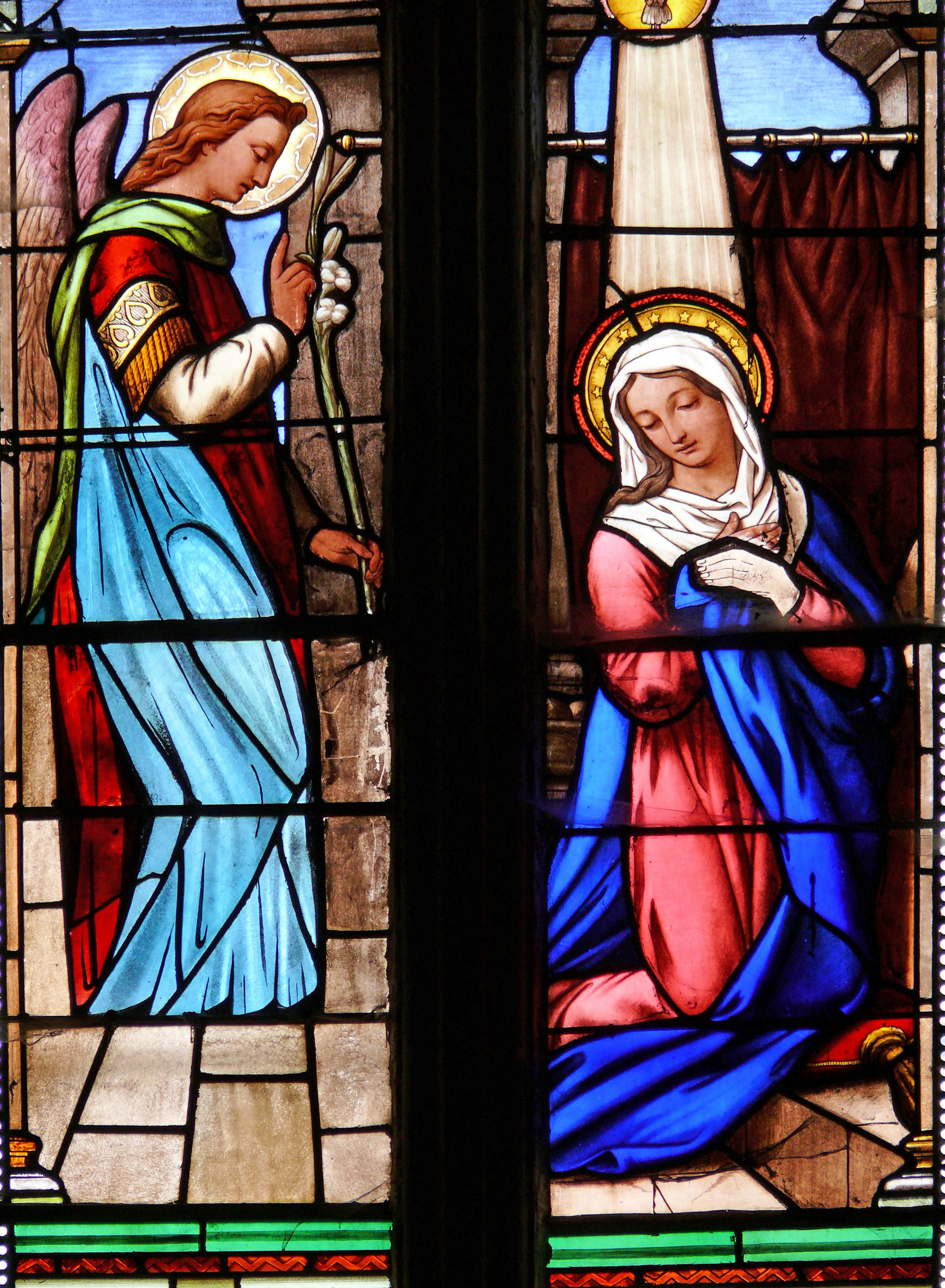
Stained glass window

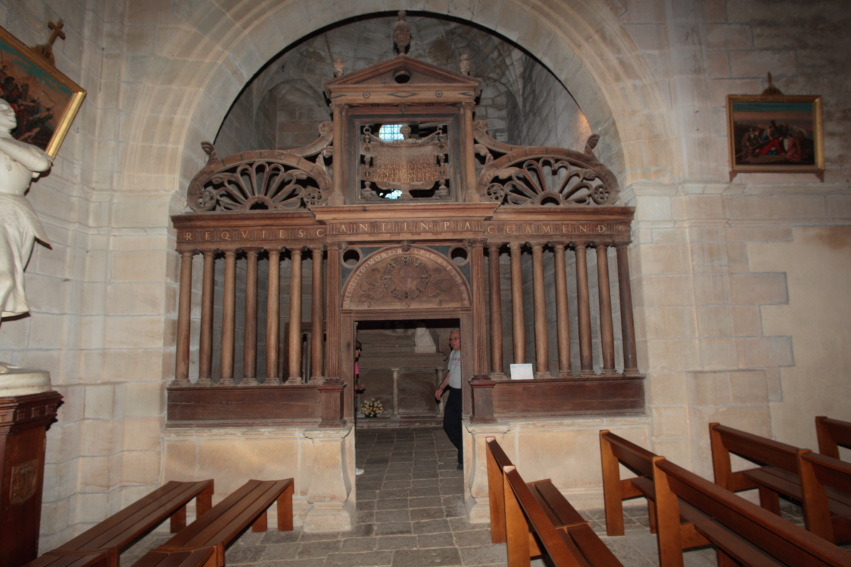
The Funeral Chapel enclosure

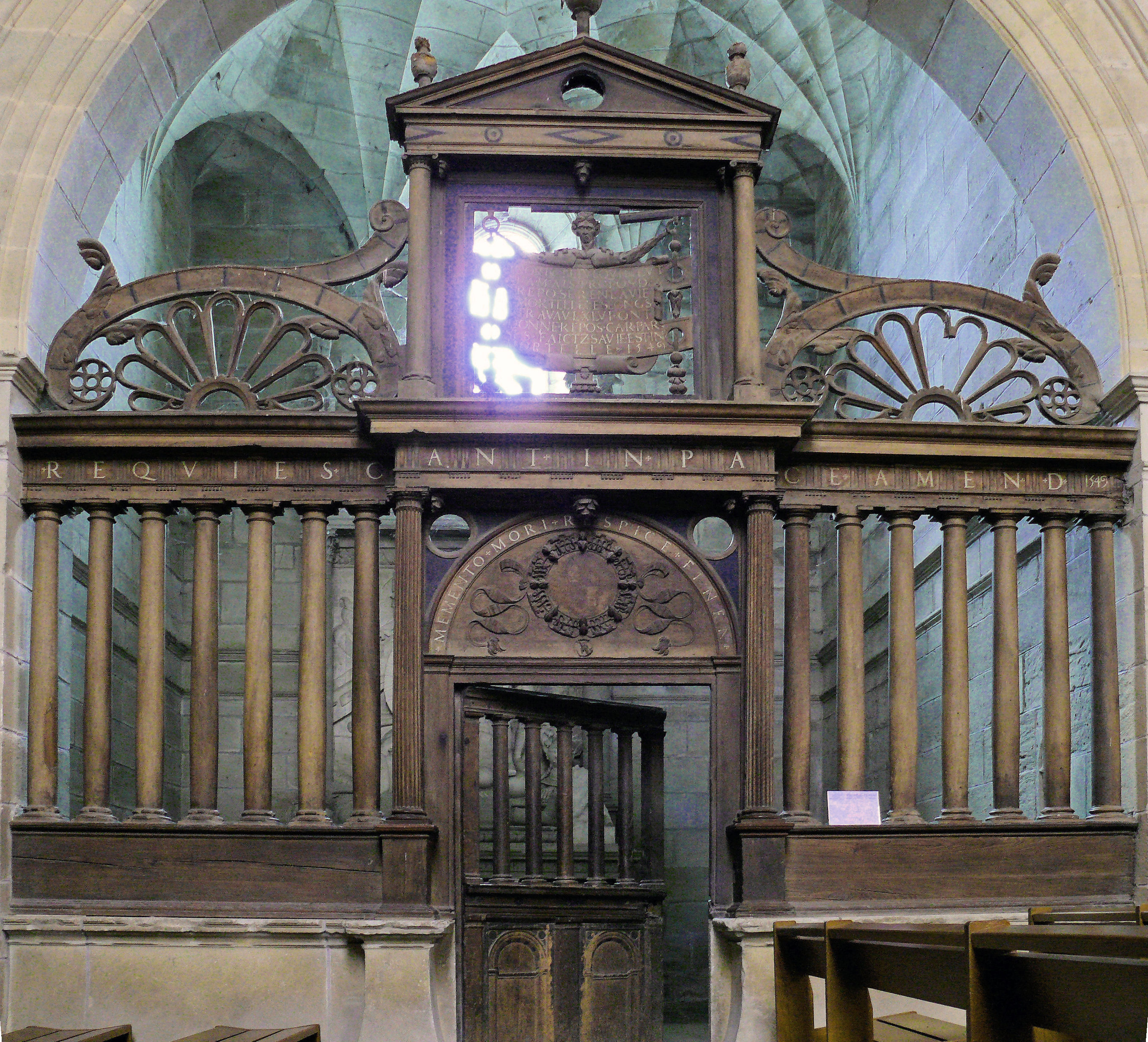
The Funeral Chapel of Galiot de Genouillac

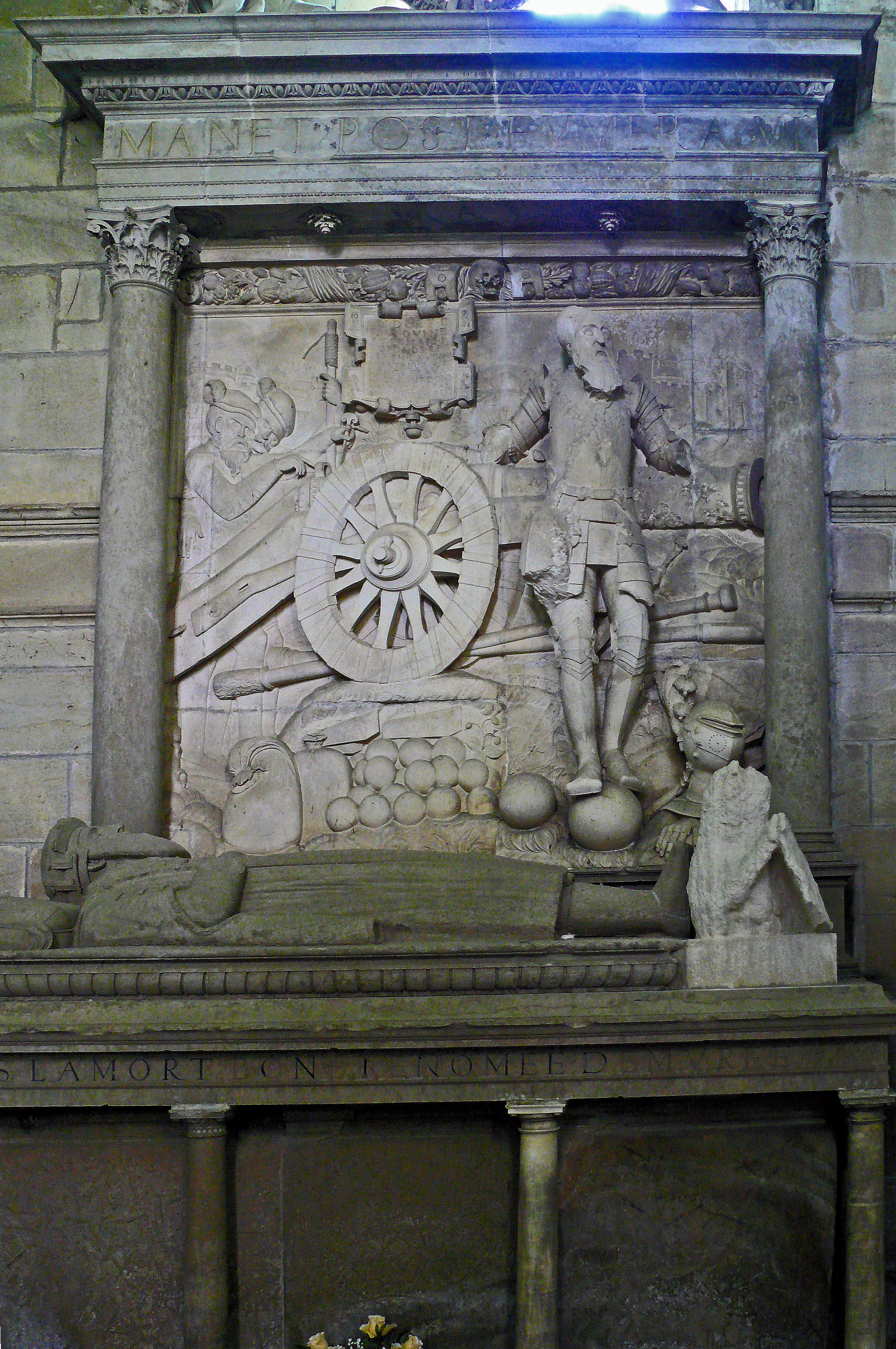
The Tomb of Galiot de Genouillac

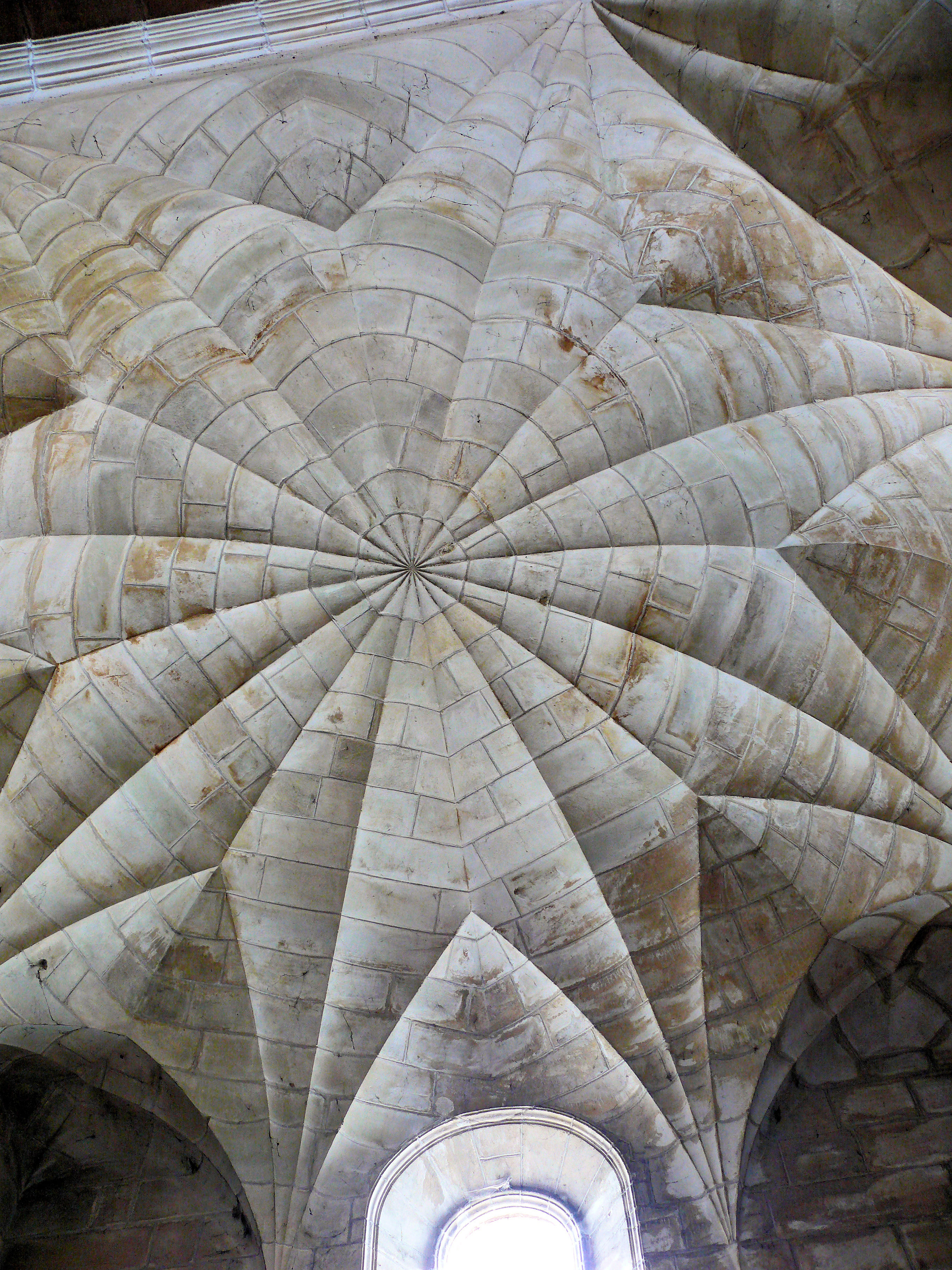
The ceiling of the Funeral Chapel

== Local life ==
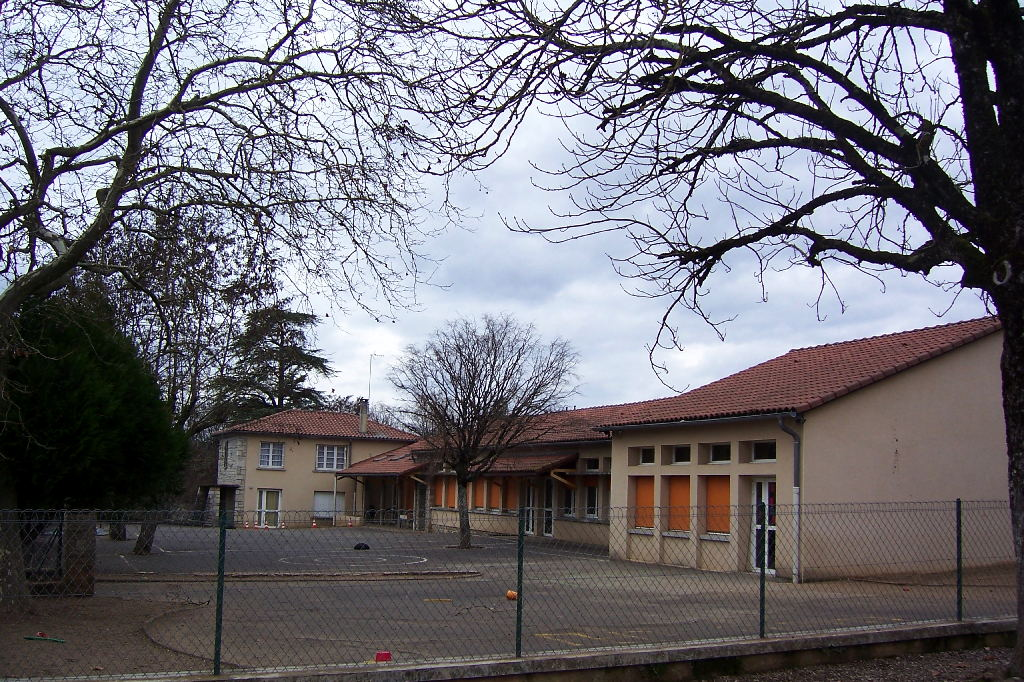
The Public School

=== Education ===
The Assier school enrols children from eleven neighbouring communes. In September 2009, the nursery school had two classes and the primary school three. The staff consists of seven teachers and two assistants.

=== Associations ===
A festival of jazz, improvisation, and theatre has taken place every year since 1986 in the chateau, the church, the gardens, and in the squares.

The REISSA Association (Meetings, Events, Initiatives, Support, Social Activities) manages the events in the village and the ALSH (Home Leisure Without Accommodation) for children.

The Cyber-base located in the House of services provides access to the Internet for all.

=== Public services ===
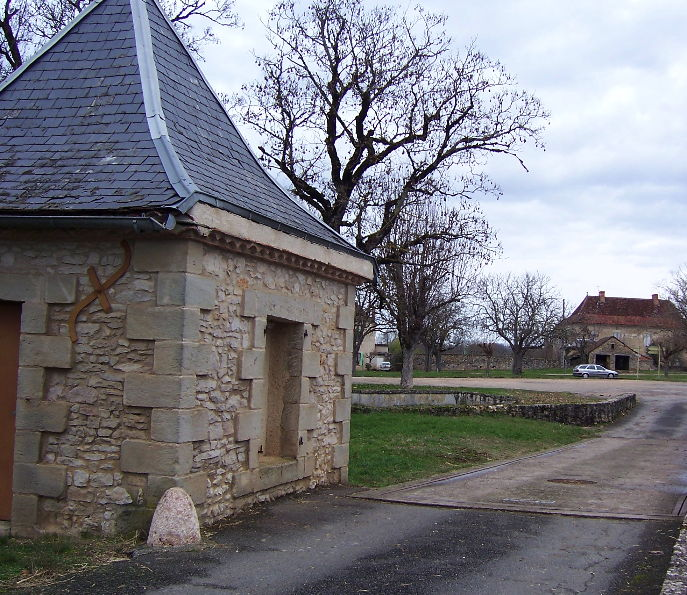
The public bascule bridge in Assier

Assier has a post office, a railway station, and a public weighbridge near the fairgrounds in the direction of Livernon.

=== Health ===
In 2009 Assier inaugurated the Causse Medical Centre. The town also has a pharmacy and a nursing centre in the village centre.

A nursing home for the elderly is located at Les Pradels.

The nearest hospitals are located at Figeac (21 km, 20 minutes by the D653 and D840) and at Cahors (57 km, 52 minutes by the D653).

== Notable people linked to the commune ==
- Jacques Ricard de Genouillace called Galiot de Genouillac, military man and French diplomat of the Renaissance, born in Assier chateau in 1465.
- Louis Brives, French politician born in Assier
- Robert Hue, French politician, occasional inhabitant of Assier.

== See also ==
- Communes of the Lot department
