= Le Bastit =

- Commune
- Location of Le Bastit
- Location within France Location within Occitanie
- Coordinates: 44°43′25″N 1°39′58″E
- Country: France
- Region: Occitania
- Department: Lot
- Arrondissement: Gourdon
- Canton: Gramat

Government
  - Mayor (2024–2026): Cyril Garrigues
- Area^{1}: 28.25 km^{2} (10.91 sq mi)
- Elevation: 350 m (1,150 ft)
- Highest elevation: 406 m (1,332 ft)
- Lowest elevation: 258 m (846 ft)
- Population (2023): 145
  - Density: 5.13/km^{2} (13.3/sq mi)
- Time zone: UTC+01:00 (CET)
  - Summer (DST): UTC+02:00 (CEST)
- INSEE/Postal code: 46018 /46500
- ^{1} French Land Register data, which excludes lakes, ponds, glaciers > 1 km^{2} (0.386 sq mi or 247 acres) and river estuaries.

Le Bastit (French pronunciation: [lə basti]; Occitan: Lo Bastit) is a commune in the Lot department in southwestern France.

== Population ==
Historical population
Year	Pop.	±% p.a.
1968	122	—
1975	113	−1.09%
1982	118	+0.62%
1990	100	−2.05%
1999	106	+0.65%
2007	127	+2.29%
2012	166	+5.50%
2017	143	−2.94%
2023	145	+0.23%
Source: INSEE

== See also ==
- Communes of the Lot department
