= Château des Anglais =

Château des Anglais may refer to:

- Château des Anglais (Autoire), a castle in the commune of Autoire in the Lot département of France
- Château des Anglais (Brengues), a castle in the commune of Brengues in the Lot département of France

== See also ==
- Le Château Anglais, a fictional gourmet restaurant in the sitcom Chef!
