= Château de Saint-Laurent-les-Tours =

Ruined castle in Occitania, France

Coordinates: 44.8650°N 1.8942°E

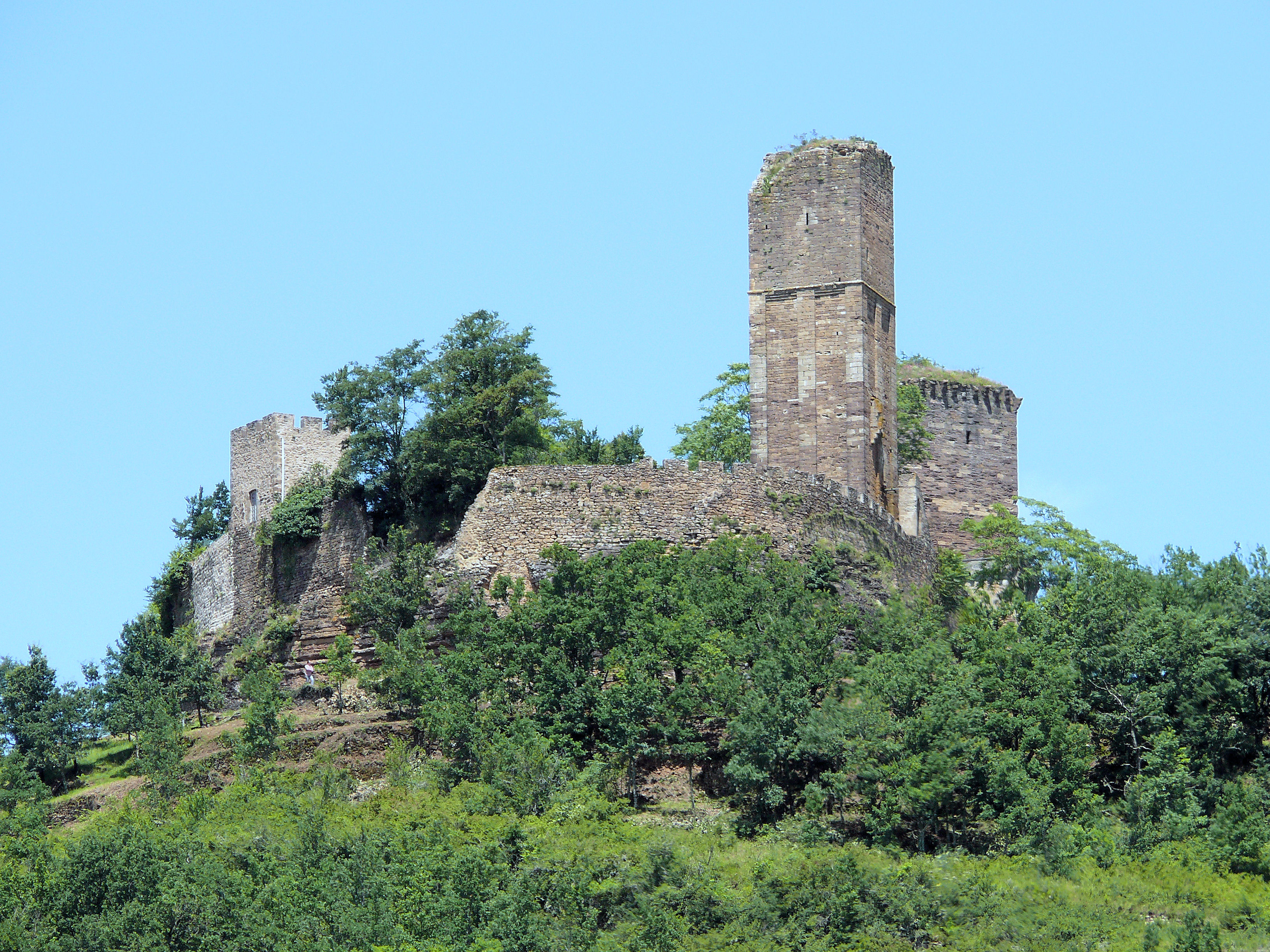
Ruins of Saint-Laurent-les-Tours castle

The Château de Saint-Laurent-les-Tours is a ruined castle in the commune of Saint-Laurent-les-Tours in the Lot département of France.

== History ==
A fortress was built on Mount Serenus in the 7th century, during the reign of King Dagobert I, to defend and monitor the valley. A village, then called Saint-Sérénus, grew around it. It sheltered Spérie, beatified for having resisted her brother who wanted to marry her against her will and who, with the help of a cousin, executed her at the place called ("le ruisseau des barbares" ("the brook of the barbarians"). Her body lies in the crypt of the church of Sainte Spérie. Her cult was for a long time the object of a pilgrimage which supported the creation of a village which became Saint-Céré, later renamed Saint Lauren and Saint-Laurent-les-Tours.

The castle belonged for eight centuries to the Viscounts of Turenne who built the two towers, the only vestiges of the construction, after the sackings of the French Wars of Religion. Louis XI was the owner. It passed into the ownership of the Noailles family, and was bought by Lafon du Verdier in 1895 who completed the remaining buildings of the current manor. The castle was transformed by Jean Lurçat who, in 1945, set up his tapestry studio there.

== Description ==
The castle ruins consist of parts of the enceinte and two square towers, one dating from the 13th century and the other from the 15th. The corps de logis, rebuilt in the 19th century in a neo-medieval style, was acquired by the painter and tapestry maker Jean Lurçat, who set up his workshop there, decorating the walls, ceilings, doors and windows. Numerous works of the artist are preserved here, including tapestries, paintings and ceramics made between 1943 and his death in 1966. The logis and the furniture were given to the département by his widow.

The castle is the property of the département. It is open to the public for six months of the year. It has been listed since 1889 as a monument historique by the French Ministry of Culture.

== See also ==
- List of castles in France
