= Château de Saignes =

Restored castle in Saignes in the Lot département of France

Coordinates: 44.7846°N 1.8190°E

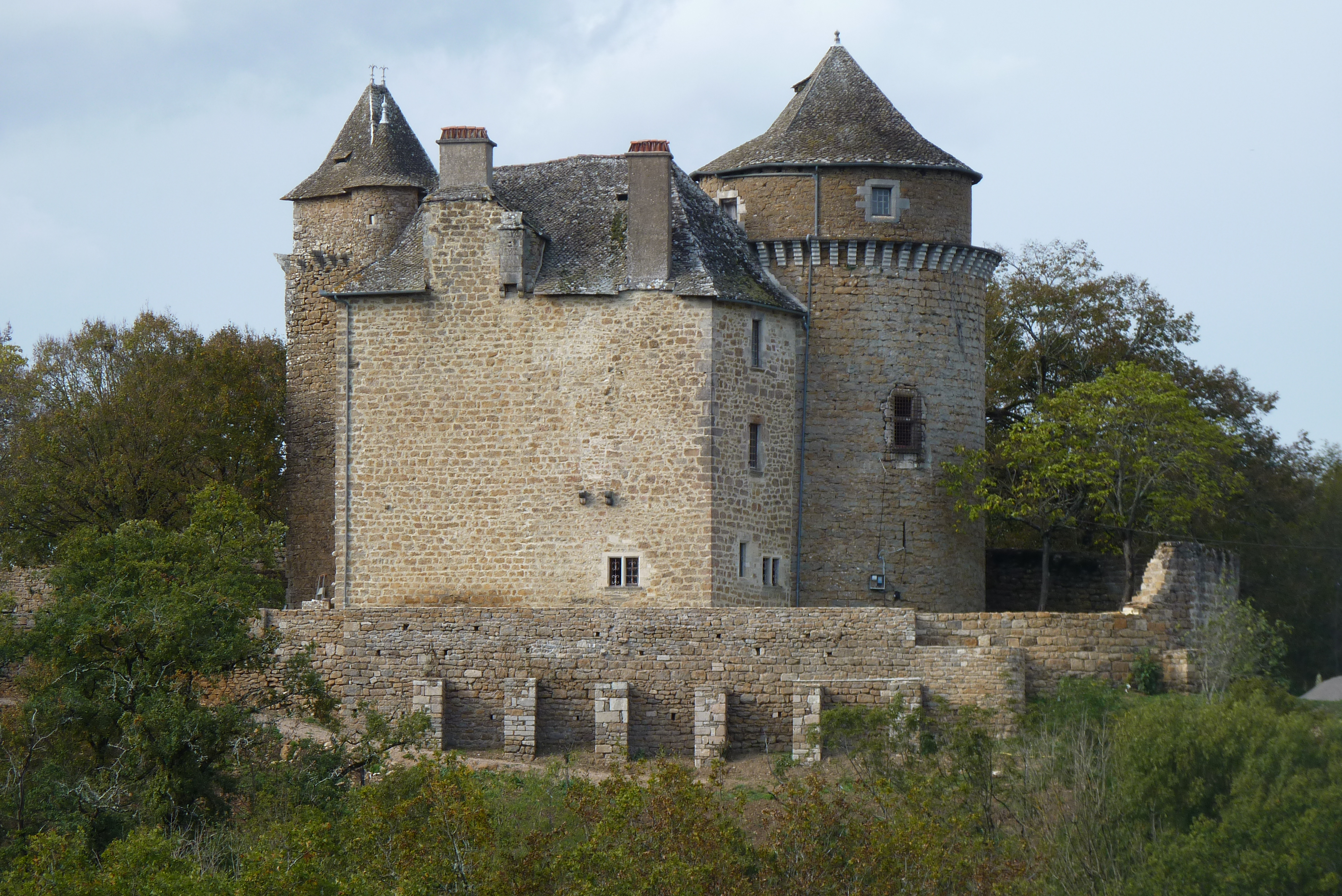
The Castle of Saignes facade

The Château de Saignes is a restored castle in the commune of Saignes in the Lot département of France.

The castrum of Saignes, with its ancient chapel outside the enceinte, became the property of the Lagarde family in the 14th century. Pierre de Lagarde, ambassadeur extraordinaire of Francis I, carried out a restoration of the estate. The castle fell into escheat during the 19th century.

The castle has seven round towers. The chapel is adorned with a bell-gable.

The Château de Saignes is private property. It has been listed since 2002 as a monument historique by the French Ministry of Culture. It can be visited since July 2022.

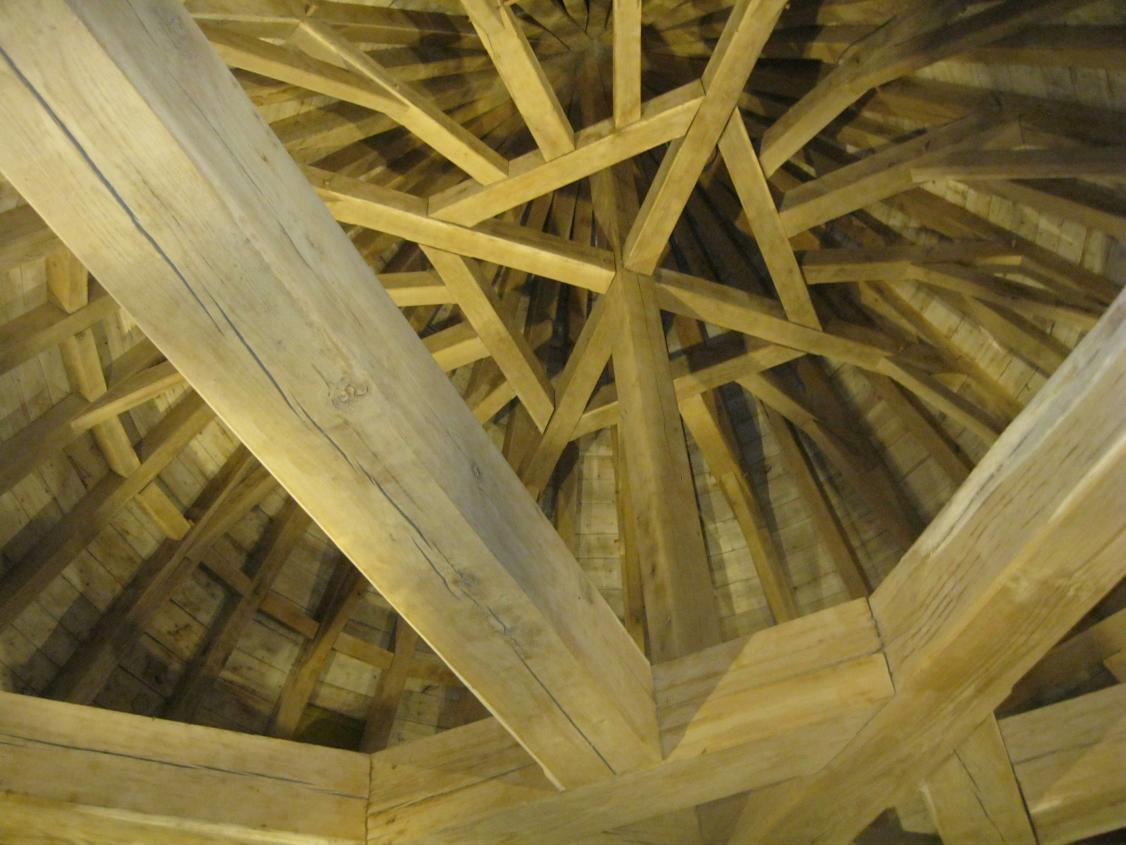
View of the higher part of Timber roof truss

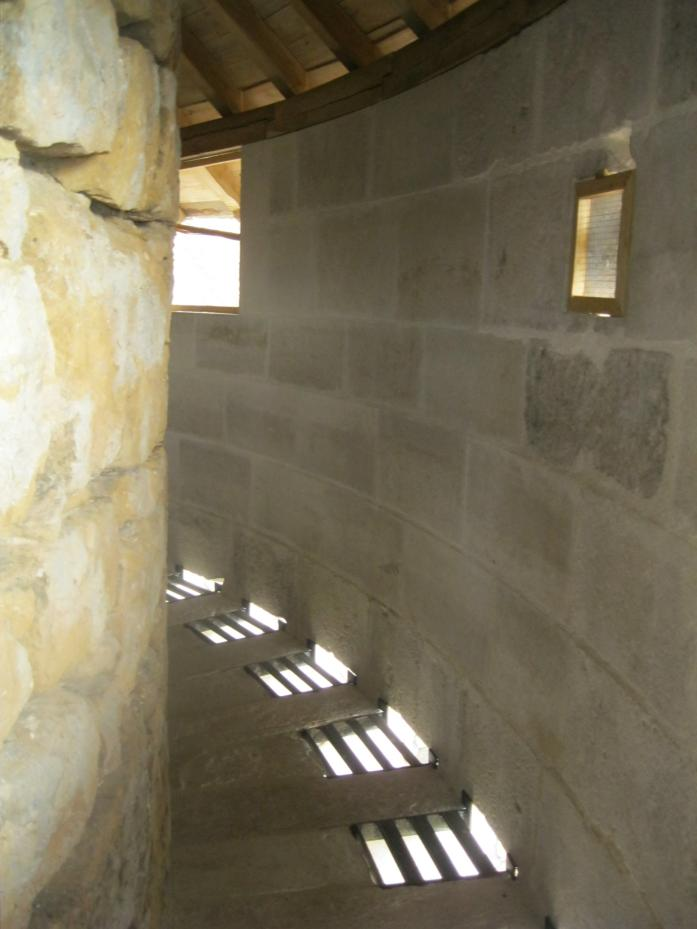
View of the Hoarding.

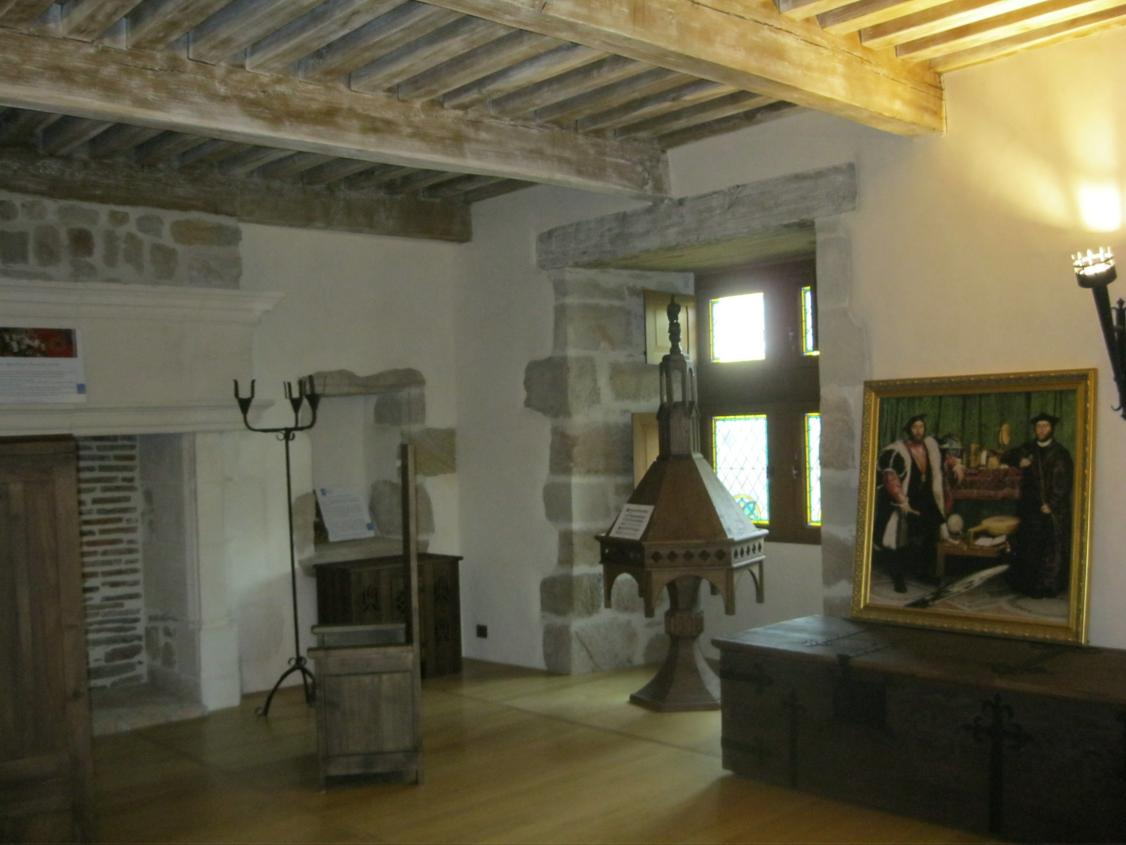
Picture of room in donjon with a copy of the painting The Ambassadors.

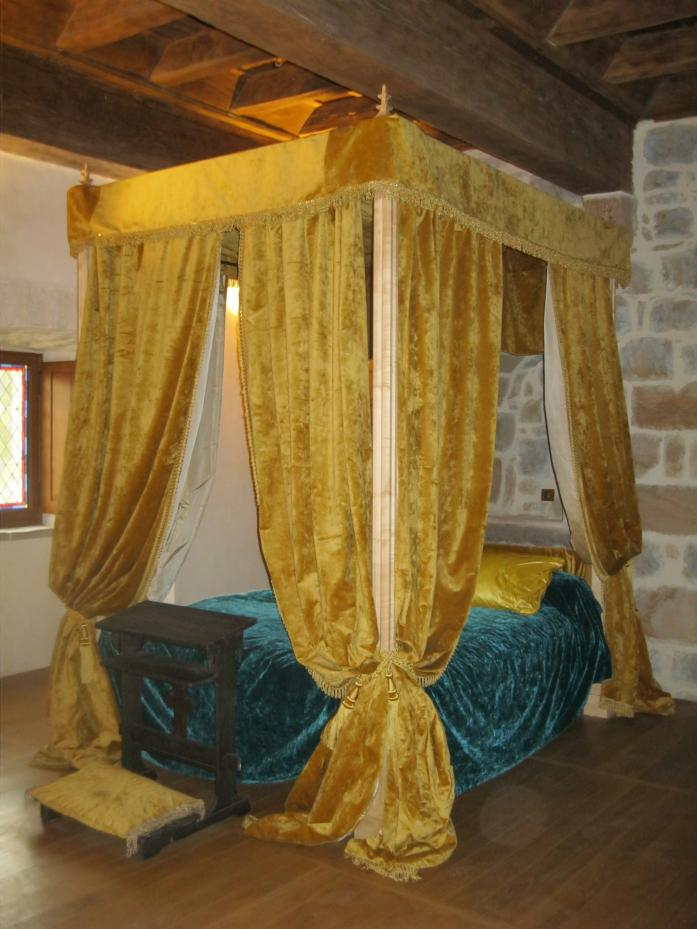
State woman bed in donjon.

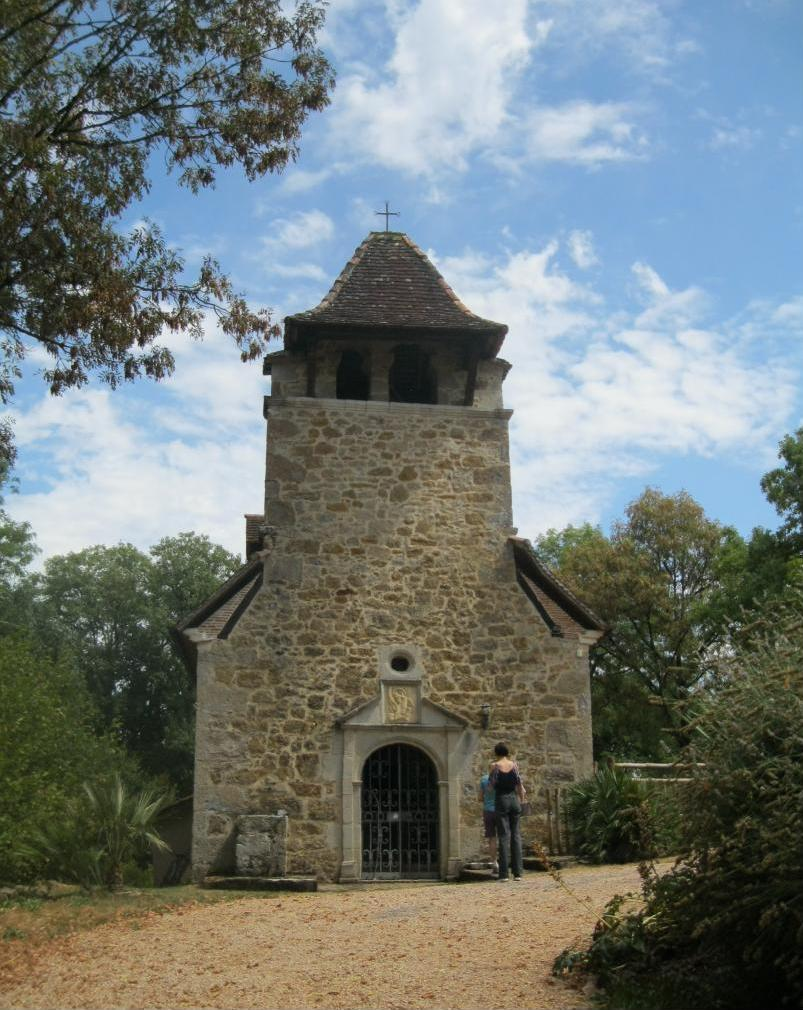
Picture of the bell tower.

== See also ==
- List of castles in France
