= Grottes de Presque =

Coordinates: 44.8513°N 1.8411°E

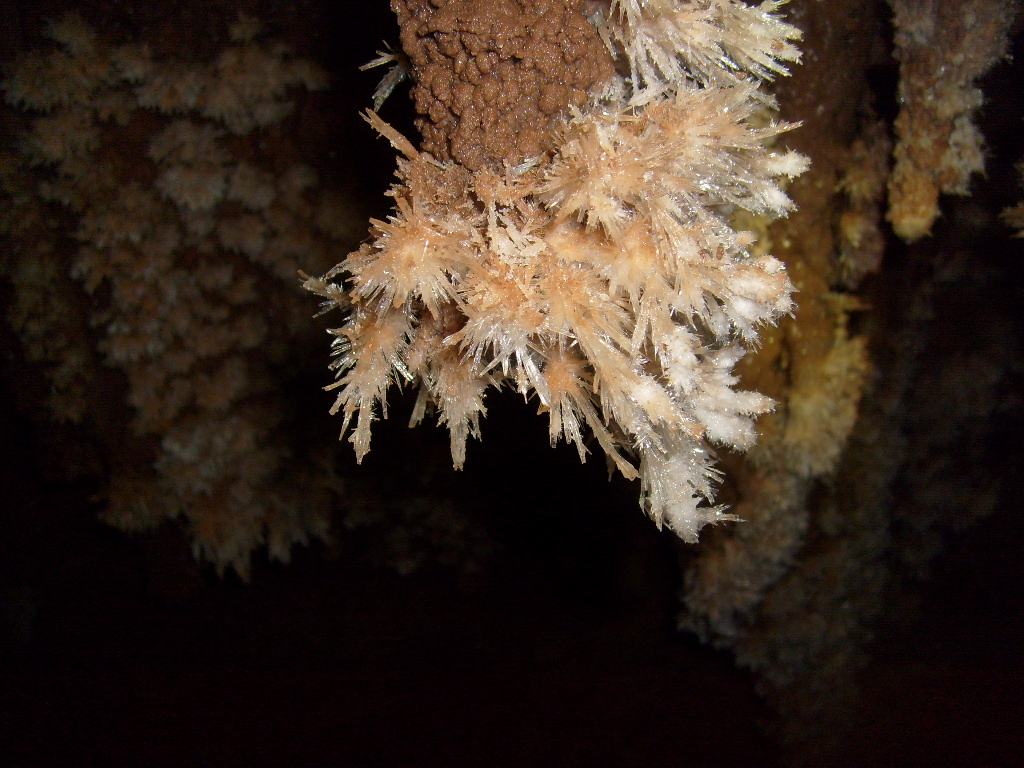
Close-up of some aragonite from the Grottes de Presque

The Grottes de Presque or Presque Caves are a group of caves in Saint-Médard-de-Presque, in the Lot department of France.

In 1825, during the construction of the D673 road from Saint-Céré to Rocamadour, the entrance to an unknown cave complex was found. It contains some great halls with very high stalactites, up to 10m, and different kind of colourful calcite deposits. It was opened to the public in 1922. Some 350m of caves can be visited. In 2011, new caves were discovered, adding some 200m to the length of the caves, and containing further large halls of up to 25m diameter and 8m high.
