= Bannes =

Bannes may refer to the following communes in France:

- Bannes, Lot, in the Lot department
- Bannes, Marne, in the Marne department
- Bannes, Haute-Marne, in the Haute-Marne department
- Bannes, Mayenne, in the Mayenne department
