= Saint-Médard-de-Presque =

- Commune
- Location of Saint-Médard-de-Presque
- Location within France Location within Occitanie
- Coordinates: 44°51′50″N 1°50′52″E
- Country: France
- Region: Occitania
- Department: Lot
- Arrondissement: Figeac
- Canton: Saint-Céré

Government
  - Mayor (2020–2026): Sébastien Maillot
- Area^{1}: 5.29 km^{2} (2.04 sq mi)
- Elevation: 400 m (1,300 ft)
- Highest elevation: 400 m (1,300 ft)
- Lowest elevation: 140 m (460 ft)
- Population (2023): 207
  - Density: 39.1/km^{2} (101/sq mi)
- Time zone: UTC+01:00 (CET)
  - Summer (DST): UTC+02:00 (CEST)
- INSEE/Postal code: 46281 /46400
- ^{1} French Land Register data, which excludes lakes, ponds, glaciers > 1 km^{2} (0.386 sq mi or 247 acres) and river estuaries.

Saint-Médard-de-Presque (French pronunciation: [sɛ̃ medaʁ də pʁɛsk]; Languedocien: Sant Miard de Presca) is a commune in the Lot department in south-western France.

== Toponymy ==
The toponym Saint-Médard-de-Presque, in the Occitan language Sent Medard, is based on the Christian hagiotoponym Médard (Medardus) bishop of Noyon. Presque, in Occitan Presca, may have come from the Latin priscus in reference to the antiquity of the site of the Césarines.

== History ==
First mention of Presque was in 960, in the cartulary of the Abbey at Beaulieu sur Dordogne mentioning land at the location. The church at the site became the property of the abbey after Raymond I, Count of Quercy and Rouergue settled the matter after two brothers who had quarrelled and duelled over it.

== Local culture and heritage ==
=== Places and monuments ===
- The Church of Saint-Médard in Saint-Médard-de-Presque (not to be confused with the church of Saint-Médard in Saint-Médard, Lot). The building is referenced in the Mérimée database and in the General Inventory of the Occitanie region. Older parts of the church date from the 1400s. In 1562, the church was burnt by the Protestants during the French Wars of Religion. The apse vault was repaired in 1600s, while most work such as the porch, bell tower, and groin vaults in the nave date from around the 1870s;
- Grottes de Presque;
- Château de Presque - Private property and a gite. In medieval times, property of the Bonafous family who were ceded the land by the Abbey of Beaulieu. The castle was rebuilt on an older building in the 1600s for the Bonafos-Presque family when two square pavilions were added in 1690. A west wing was added in the 1700s. The Bonafous family sold the seigneury in 1712 to Costa de Beaulieu. The castle was then neglected and became a ruin and was then sold in Saint-Céré in 1877 to a new owner.

== See also ==
- Communes of the Lot department
- Grottes de Presque
