= Aynac =

- Commune
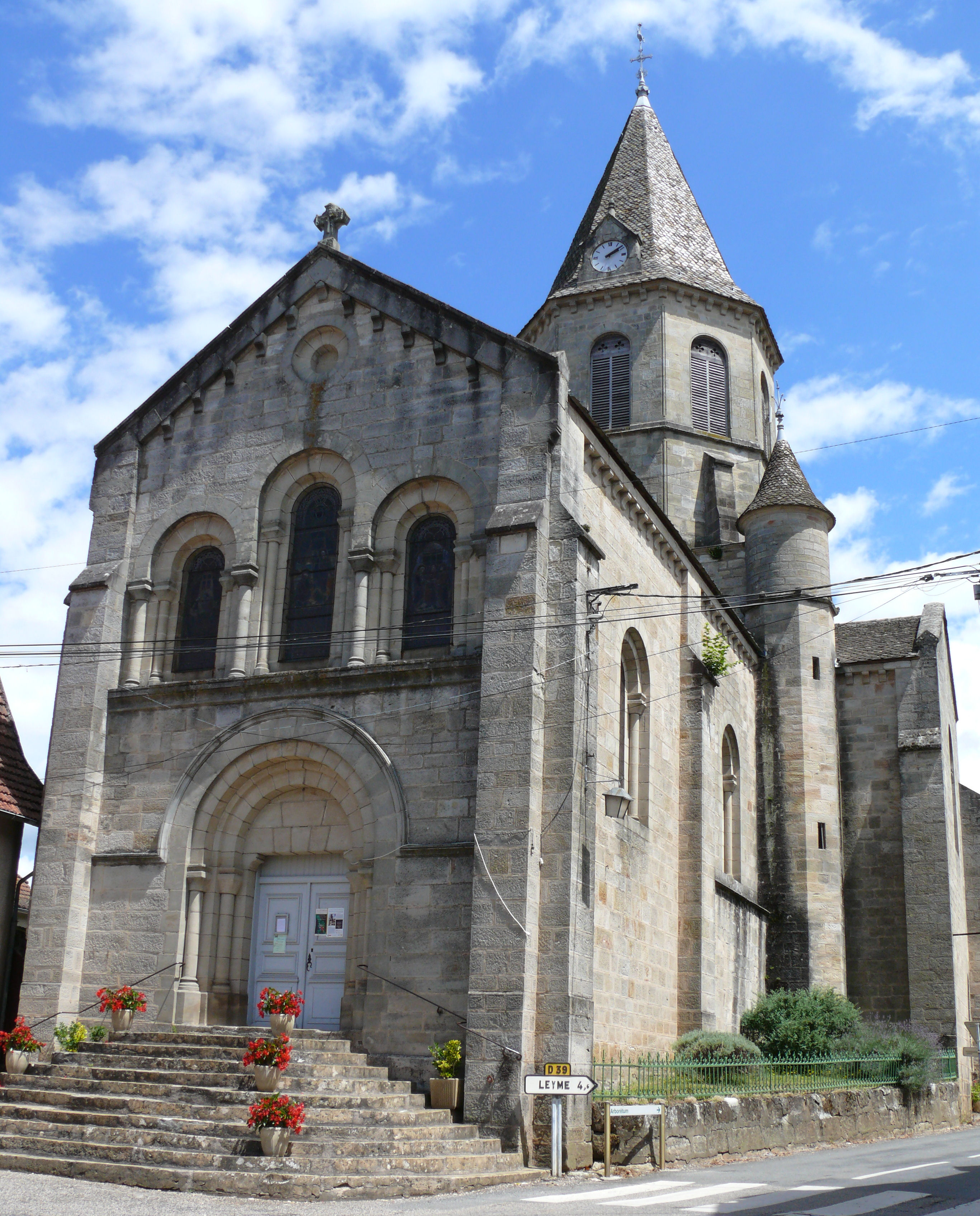
- Church of Saint Geniès
- Location of Aynac
- Location within France Location within Occitanie
- Coordinates: 44°47′07″N 1°51′07″E
- Country: France
- Region: Occitania
- Department: Lot
- Arrondissement: Figeac
- Canton: Saint-Céré
- Intercommunality: Grand-Figeac

Government
  - Mayor (2020–2026): Jacques Andurand
- Area^{1}: 21.55 km^{2} (8.32 sq mi)
- Elevation: 351 m (1,152 ft)
- Highest elevation: 607 m (1,991 ft)
- Lowest elevation: 324 m (1,063 ft)
- Population (2023): 561
  - Density: 26.0/km^{2} (67.4/sq mi)
- Time zone: UTC+01:00 (CET)
  - Summer (DST): UTC+02:00 (CEST)
- INSEE/Postal code: 46012 /46120
- ^{1} French Land Register data, which excludes lakes, ponds, glaciers > 1 km^{2} (0.386 sq mi or 247 acres) and river estuaries.

Aynac (French pronunciation: [ɛnak]; Occitan: Ainac) is a commune in the Lot department in southwestern France.

== Population ==
Historical population
Year	Pop.	±% p.a.
1968	667	—
1975	637	−0.66%
1982	614	−0.52%
1990	604	−0.21%
1999	527	−1.50%
2007	540	+0.31%
2012	613	+2.57%
2017	550	−2.15%
2023	561	+0.33%
Source: INSEE

== See also ==
- Communes of the Lot department
