= Saint-Vincent-du-Pendit =

- Commune
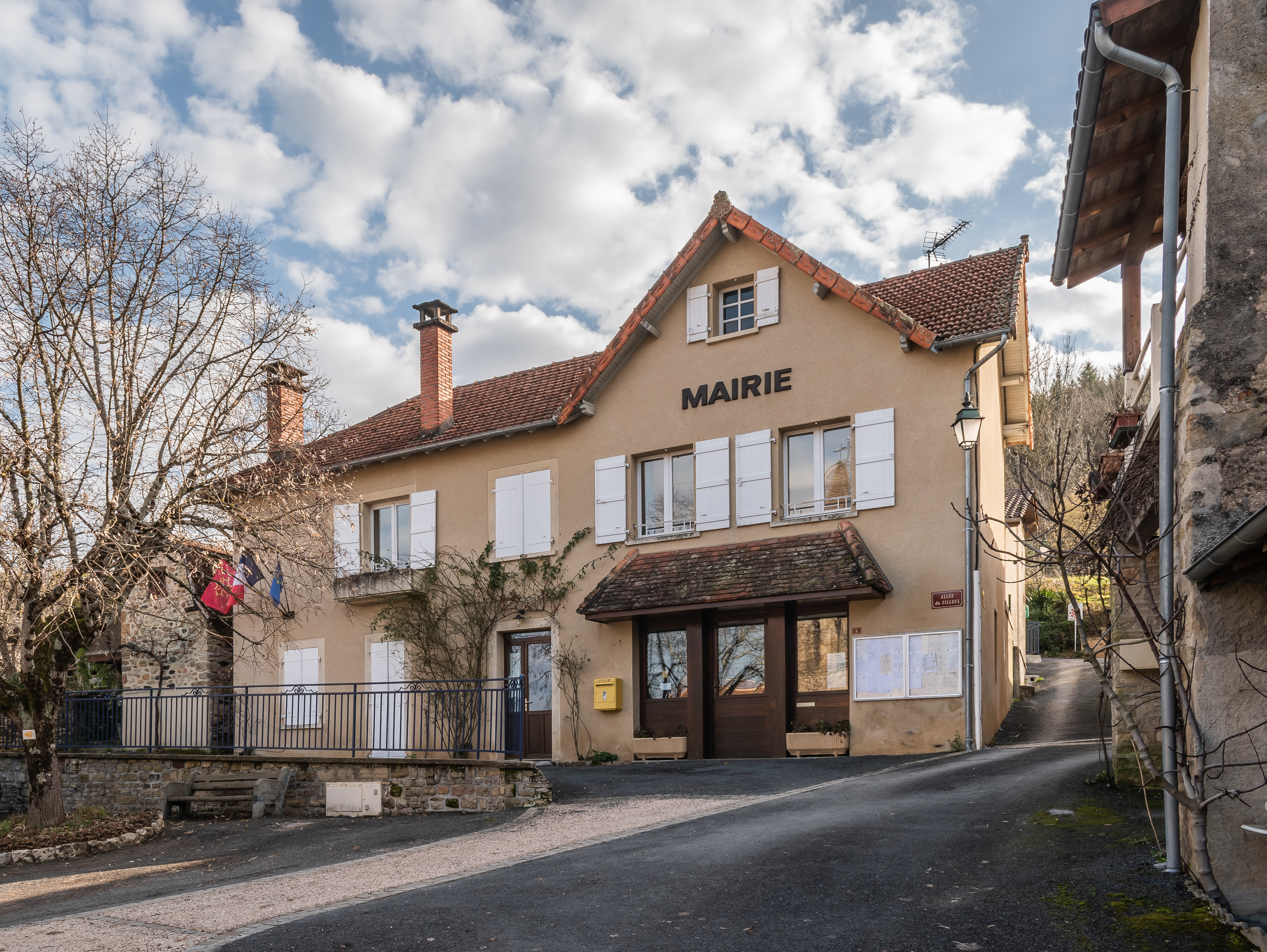
- Town hall of St-Vincent-du-Pendit
- Location of Saint-Vincent-du-Pendit
- Location within France Location within Occitanie
- Coordinates: 44°50′22″N 1°54′10″E
- Country: France
- Region: Occitania
- Department: Lot
- Arrondissement: Figeac
- Canton: Saint-Céré

Government
  - Mayor (2020–2026): Roger Larribe
- Area^{1}: 9.24 km^{2} (3.57 sq mi)
- Elevation: 550 m (1,800 ft)
- Highest elevation: 628 m (2,060 ft)
- Lowest elevation: 170 m (560 ft)
- Population (2023): 230
  - Density: 25/km^{2} (64/sq mi)
- Time zone: UTC+01:00 (CET)
  - Summer (DST): UTC+02:00 (CEST)
- INSEE/Postal code: 46295 /46400
- ^{1} French Land Register data, which excludes lakes, ponds, glaciers > 1 km^{2} (0.386 sq mi or 247 acres) and river estuaries.

Saint-Vincent-du-Pendit (French pronunciation: [sɛ̃ vɛ̃sɑ̃ dy pɑ̃di]; Occitan: Sant Vincenç) is a commune in the Lot department in south-western France.

== See also ==
- Communes of the Lot department
