= Latouille-Lentillac =

- Commune
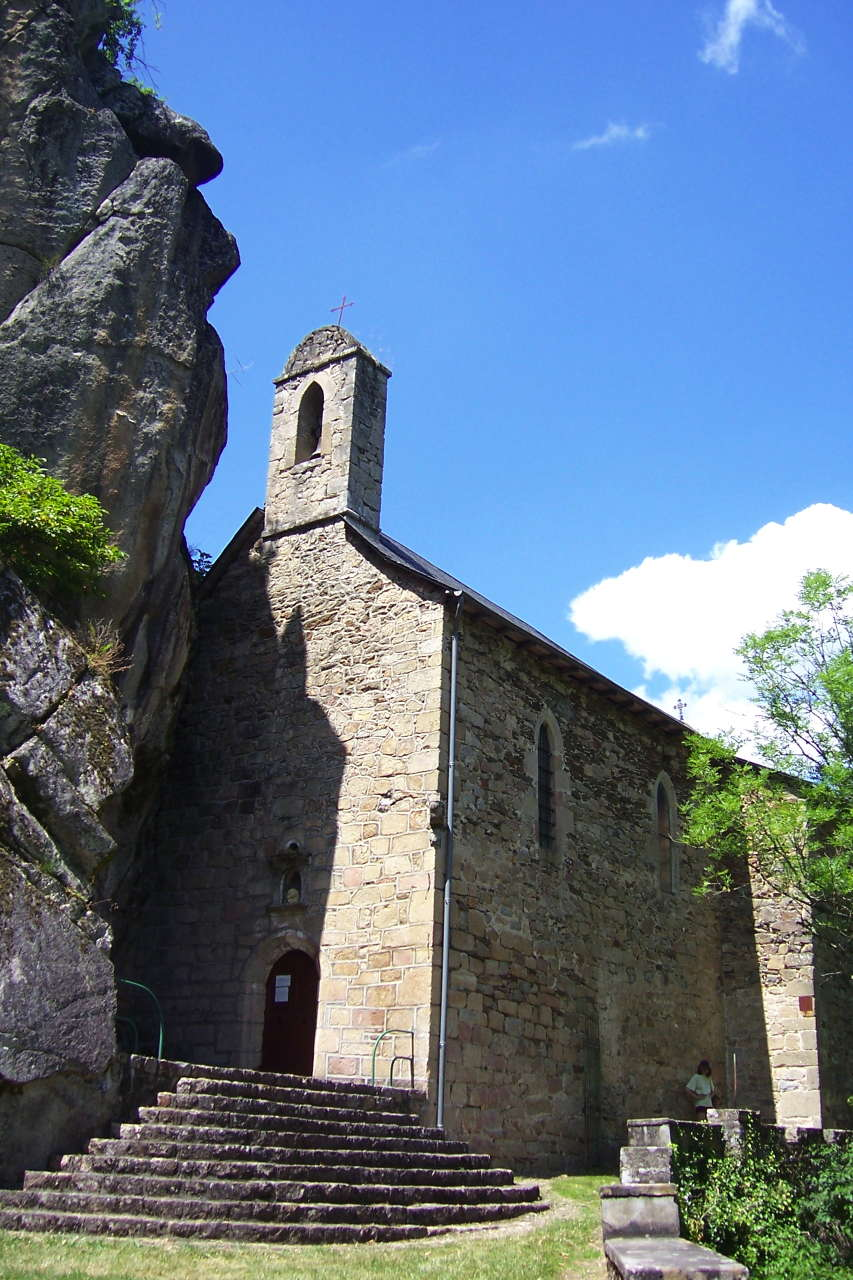
- The chapel of Verdale, in Latouille-Lentillac
- Location of Latouille-Lentillac
- Location within France Location within Occitanie
- Coordinates: 44°51′18″N 1°57′48″E
- Country: France
- Region: Occitania
- Department: Lot
- Arrondissement: Figeac
- Canton: Saint-Céré
- Intercommunality: Causses et Vallée de la Dordogne

Government
  - Mayor (2020–2026): Danielle Gamba
- Area^{1}: 11.71 km^{2} (4.52 sq mi)
- Elevation: 220 m (720 ft)
- Highest elevation: 573 m (1,880 ft)
- Lowest elevation: 184 m (604 ft)
- Population (2023): 247
  - Density: 21.1/km^{2} (54.6/sq mi)
- Time zone: UTC+01:00 (CET)
  - Summer (DST): UTC+02:00 (CEST)
- INSEE/Postal code: 46159 /46400
- ^{1} French Land Register data, which excludes lakes, ponds, glaciers > 1 km^{2} (0.386 sq mi or 247 acres) and river estuaries.

Latouille-Lentillac (French pronunciation: [latuj lɑ̃tijak]; Occitan: La Tolha e Lentilhac) is a commune in the Lot department in south-western France.

== See also ==
- Communes of the Lot department
