= Mayrinhac-Lentour =

- Commune
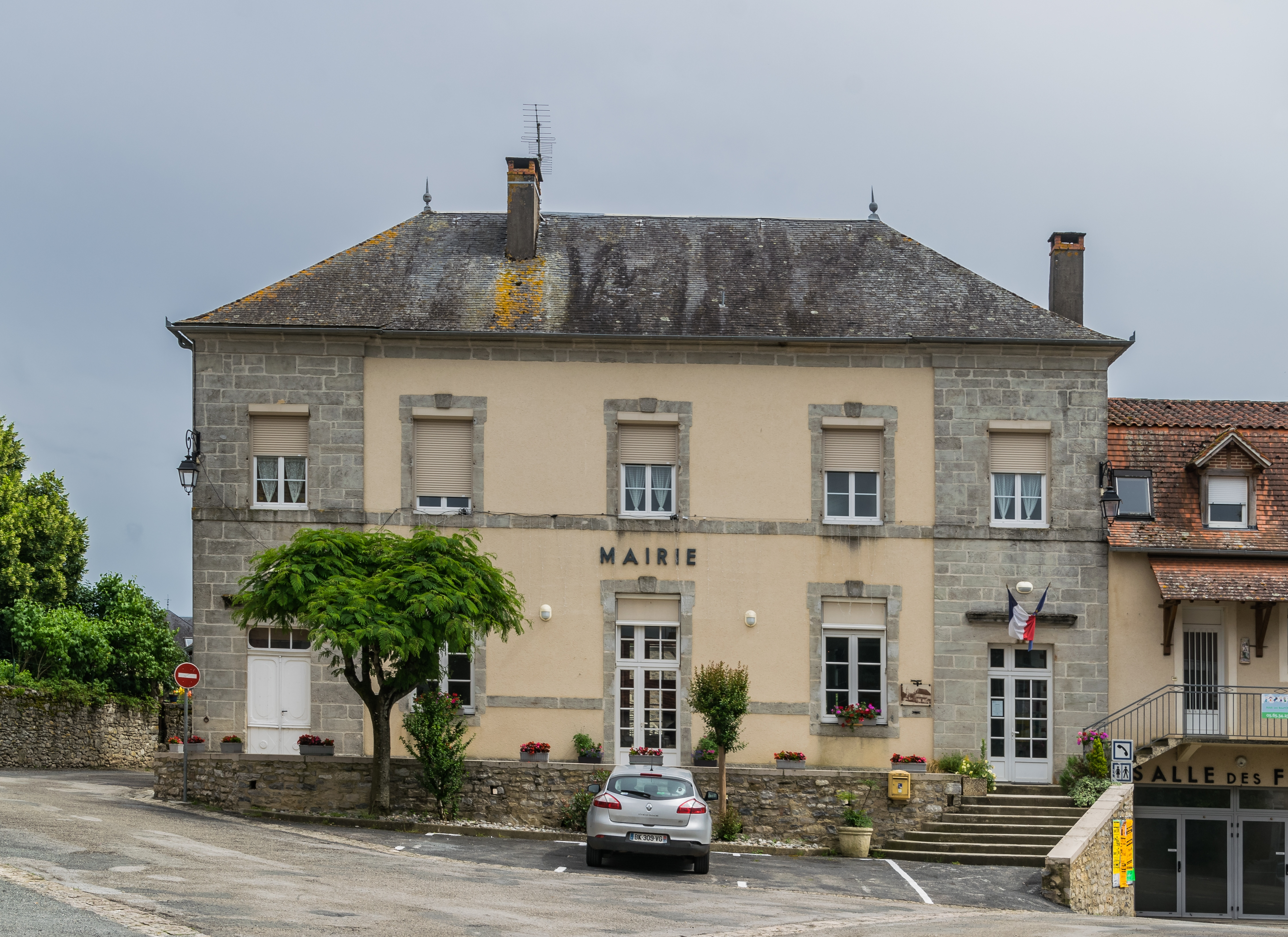
- Town hall
- Location of Mayrinhac-Lentour
- Location within France Location within Occitanie
- Coordinates: 44°48′52″N 1°48′29″E
- Country: France
- Region: Occitania
- Department: Lot
- Arrondissement: Figeac
- Canton: Saint-Céré
- Intercommunality: Causses et Vallée de la Dordogne

Government
  - Mayor (2022–2026): Frédéric Bardin
- Area^{1}: 15.57 km^{2} (6.01 sq mi)
- Elevation: 357 m (1,171 ft)
- Highest elevation: 448 m (1,470 ft)
- Lowest elevation: 310 m (1,020 ft)
- Population (2023): 484
  - Density: 31.1/km^{2} (80.5/sq mi)
- Time zone: UTC+01:00 (CET)
  - Summer (DST): UTC+02:00 (CEST)
- INSEE/Postal code: 46189 /46500
- ^{1} French Land Register data, which excludes lakes, ponds, glaciers > 1 km^{2} (0.386 sq mi or 247 acres) and river estuaries.

Mayrinhac-Lentour is a commune in the Lot department in south-western France.

== See also ==
- Communes of the Lot department
