= Canton of Saint-Céré =

Coordinates: 44.86°N 1.89°E

The canton of Saint-Céré is an administrative division of the Lot department, southern France. Its borders were modified at the French canton reorganisation which came into effect in March 2015. Its seat is in Saint-Céré.

It consists of the following communes:

1. Autoire
2. Aynac
3. Bannes
4. Frayssinhes
5. Ladirat
6. Latouille-Lentillac
7. Leyme
8. Loubressac
9. Mayrinhac-Lentour
10. Molières
11. Saignes
12. Saint-Céré
13. Saint-Jean-Lagineste
14. Saint-Jean-Lespinasse
15. Saint-Laurent-les-Tours
16. Saint-Médard-de-Presque
17. Saint-Paul-de-Vern
18. Saint-Vincent-du-Pendit
