= Saint-Jean-Lagineste =

- Commune
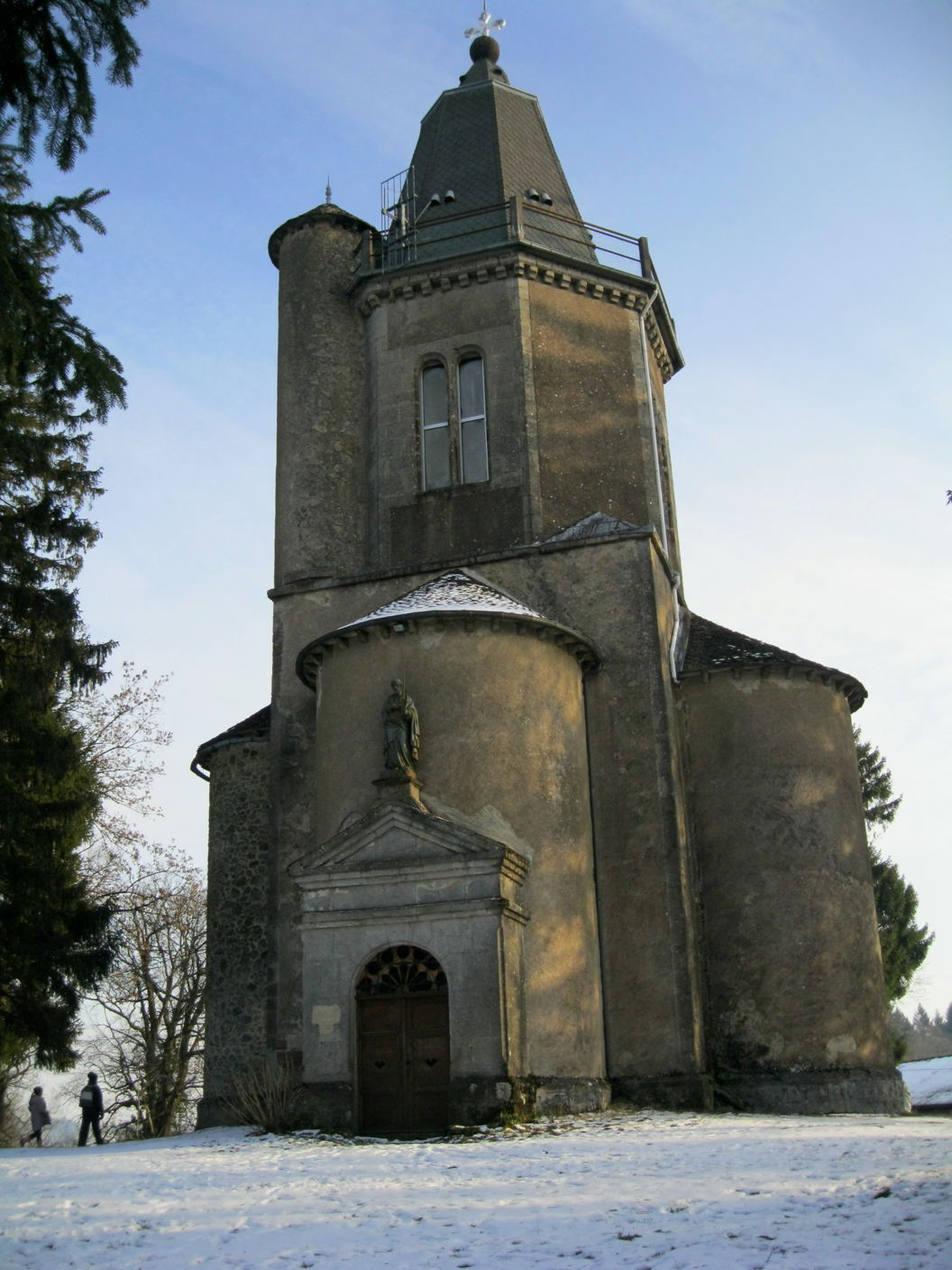
- The chapel of Mont Saint-Joseph
- Location of Saint-Jean-Lagineste
- Location within France Location within Occitanie
- Coordinates: 44°49′27″N 1°51′42″E
- Country: France
- Region: Occitania
- Department: Lot
- Arrondissement: Figeac
- Canton: Saint-Céré

Government
  - Mayor (2020–2026): Monique Martignac
- Area^{1}: 12.66 km^{2} (4.89 sq mi)
- Elevation: 480 m (1,570 ft)
- Highest elevation: 605 m (1,985 ft)
- Lowest elevation: 251 m (823 ft)
- Population (2023): 378
  - Density: 29.9/km^{2} (77.3/sq mi)
- Time zone: UTC+01:00 (CET)
  - Summer (DST): UTC+02:00 (CEST)
- INSEE/Postal code: 46339 /46400
- ^{1} French Land Register data, which excludes lakes, ponds, glaciers > 1 km^{2} (0.386 sq mi or 247 acres) and river estuaries.

Saint-Jean-Lagineste (French pronunciation: [sɛ̃ ʒɑ̃ laʒinɛst]; Languedocien: La Ginèsta) is a commune in the Lot department in south-western France.

== See also ==
- Communes of the Lot department
