= Autoire =

- Commune
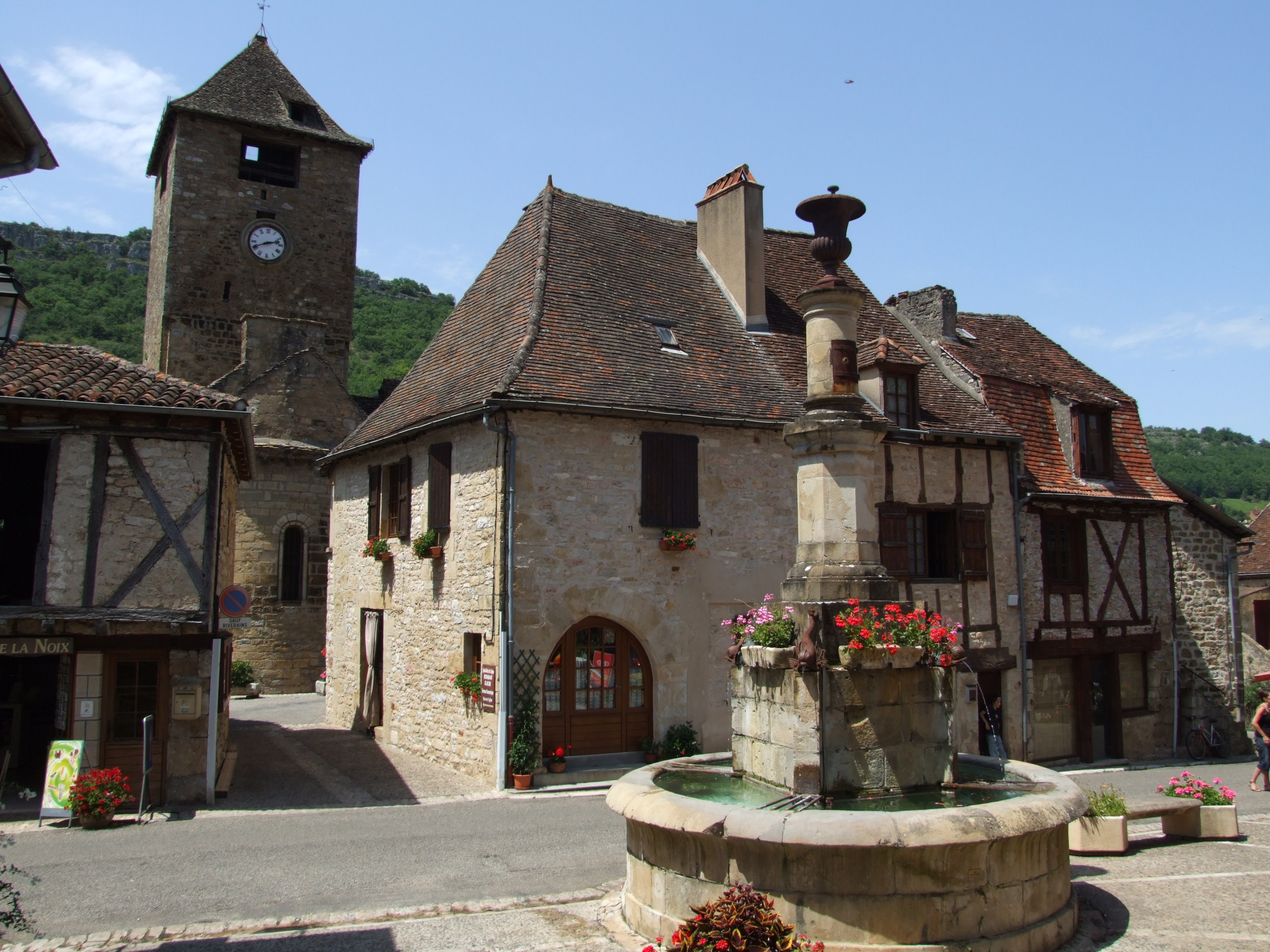
- Buildings in the centre of Autoire

- Coat of arms
- Location of Autoire
- Location within France Location within Occitanie
- Coordinates: 44°51′19″N 1°49′12″E
- Country: France
- Region: Occitania
- Department: Lot
- Arrondissement: Figeac
- Canton: Saint-Céré
- Intercommunality: CC Causses Vallée Dordogne

Government
  - Mayor (2020–2026): Alain Nouzières
- Area^{1}: 7.15 km^{2} (2.76 sq mi)
- Elevation: 300 m (980 ft)
- Highest elevation: 396 m (1,299 ft)
- Lowest elevation: 134 m (440 ft)
- Population (2023): 376
  - Density: 52.6/km^{2} (136/sq mi)
- Time zone: UTC+01:00 (CET)
  - Summer (DST): UTC+02:00 (CEST)
- INSEE/Postal code: 46011 /46400
- ^{1} French Land Register data, which excludes lakes, ponds, glaciers > 1 km^{2} (0.386 sq mi or 247 acres) and river estuaries.

Autoire (French pronunciation: [otwaʁ]; Languedocien: Altoire) is a commune in the Lot department in southwestern France.

== Toponymy ==
The toponym Autoire could come from:

- of Altodurum formed from altus and duros which means fortress in Celtic;
- or from Occitan toire which designates a work related to the flow of water: a conduit, an aqueduct with the addition of al.

== History ==
The village's first written mention is in 895 when its existence is mentioned in the cartulary of the monastery at Beaulieu sur Dordogne. It was in possession of the Count of Toulouse and later the Viscount of Turenne over various periods of time. The village, one of over sixty-three others, was ceded to the King of England, Edward I in 1286.

During the Hundred Years War, Bernard de la Salle, a captain in the Grandes Compagnies et Gascon took possession of Chateau de Anglais in 1378. During the French War of Religion, Calvinist forces attacked the village, burning the church and ransomed the villagers, and then in 1562 the village was burnt.

== Demographics ==
Historical population
Year	Pop.	±% p.a.
1968	234	—
1975	209	−1.60%
1982	233	+1.57%
1990	272	+1.95%
1999	312	+1.54%
2007	345	+1.26%
2012	342	−0.17%
2017	358	+0.92%
2023	376	+0.82%
Source: INSEE

== Local culture and heritage ==
=== Places and monuments ===
Autoire is labelled as one of the "most beautiful villages in France" by the Les Plus Beaux Villages de France association; You can admire among others:

- The Autoire valley, its cirque and waterfall.
- The ruins of the Château des Anglais, listed as a historical monument on 26 October 1925.
- The Chapelle Saint-Roch, listed as a historical monument since 2014.
- The old Château de Limargue, 15th century: listed as a historical monument on 6 April 1929.
- The manor house of Laroque-Delprat.
- The Château de Busqueilles, 17th century, registered by decree on 8 April 1991 as a historical monument.
- The Château de La Roque-Maynard.
- The Eglise Romane Saint-Pierre, 11th century church, remodelled in eighteenth century. 15th century: listed as a historic monument on 2 December 1942. Several objects are referenced in the Base Palissy database.
- The Manoir de Colomb (named after General de Colomb who gave his name to the city of Colomb-Béchard (Algeria))

The Cirque d'Autoire has been labelled a Sensitive Natural Area since the end of 2009. The works financed by the General Council of the Lot were inaugurated on 31 July 2014. The upper part of the site has become a pedestrian zone, and vehicles are parked in the hamlet of Siran, the Château des Anglais has been preserved, and its access secured by new stairs and the installation of 300 meters of railings. Archaeological excavations have shown that the castle was covered with flat tiles and had one floor more than at present.

== Gallery ==
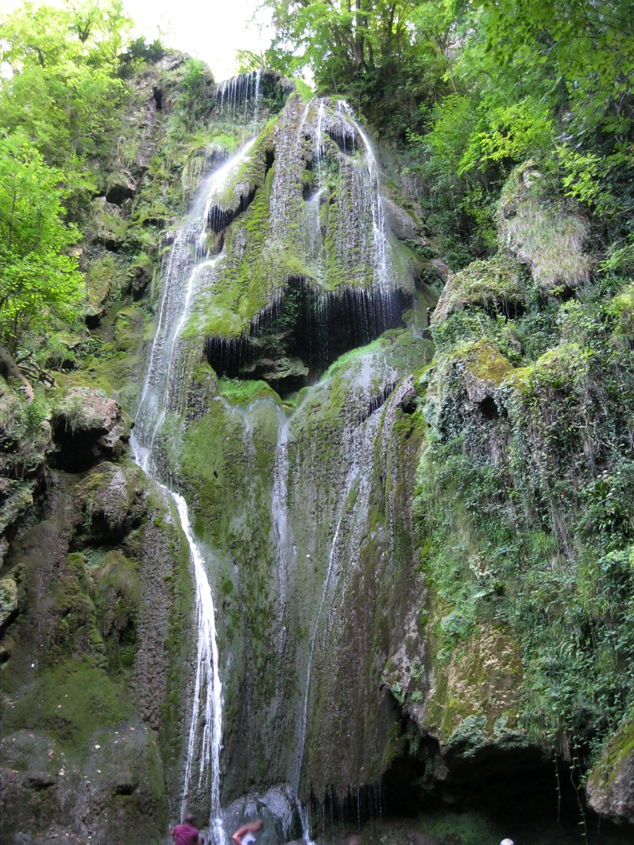
The waterfall of Autoire.

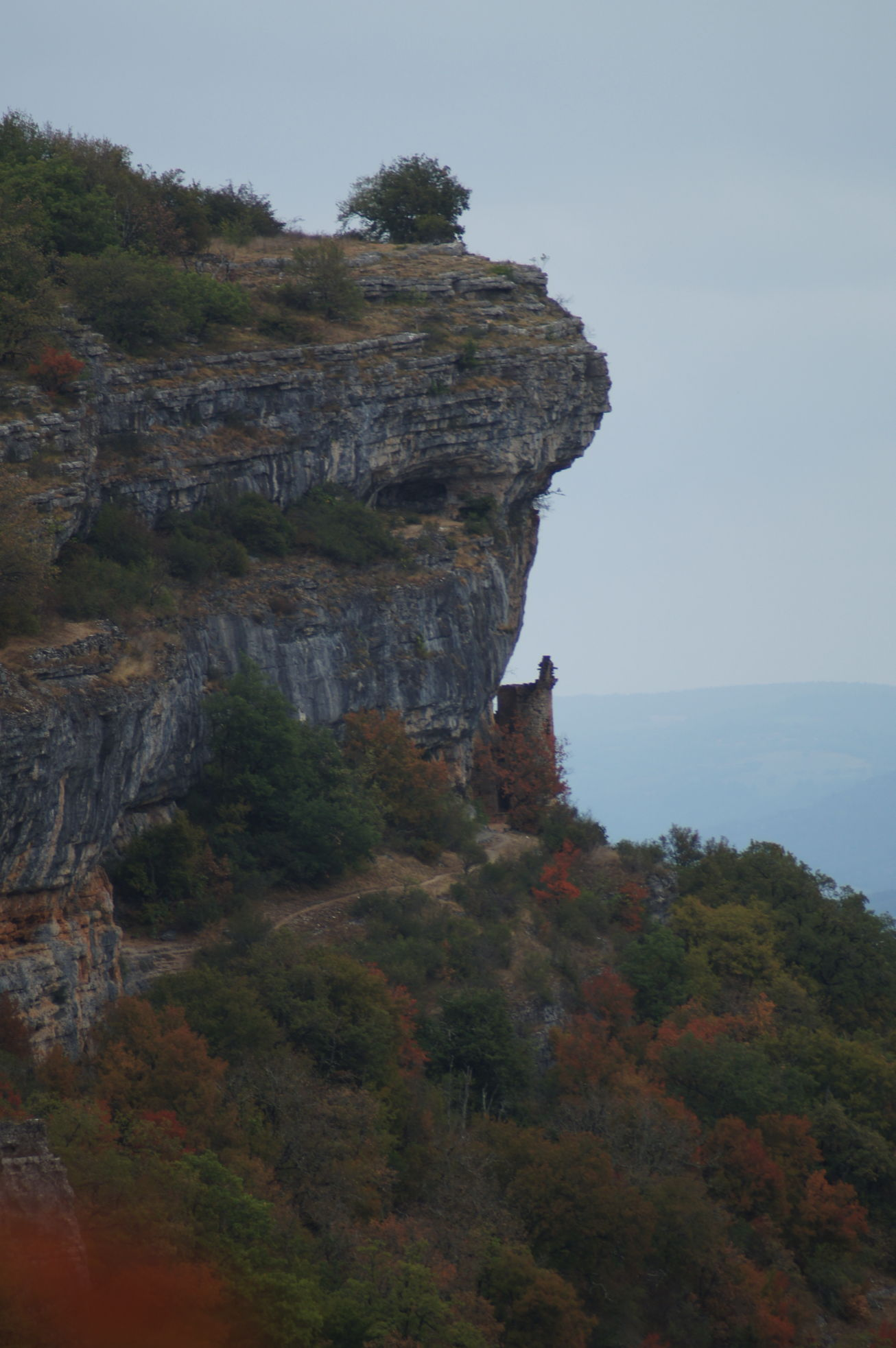
View of the Château des Anglais from Siran.

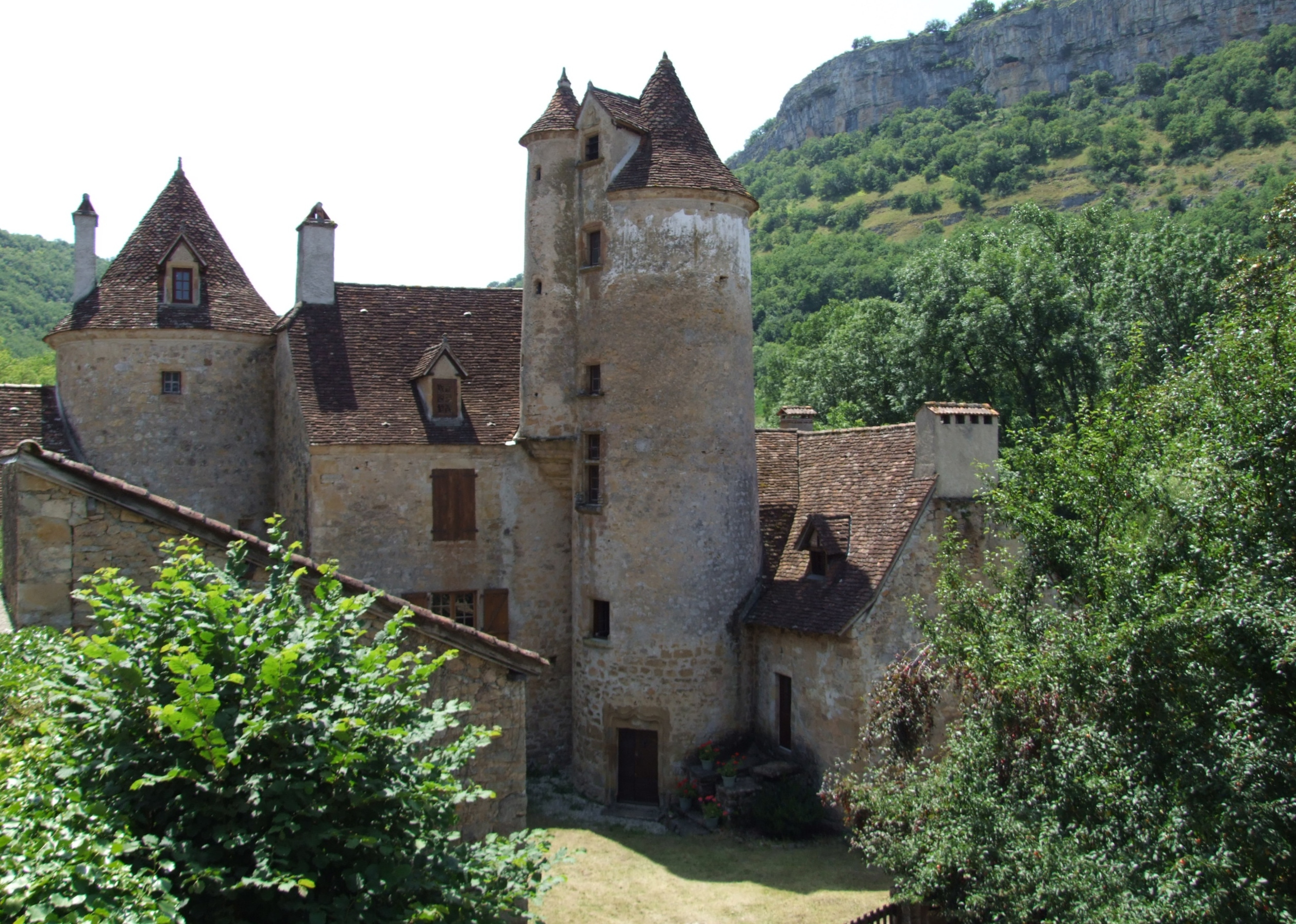
Old Château de Limargue.

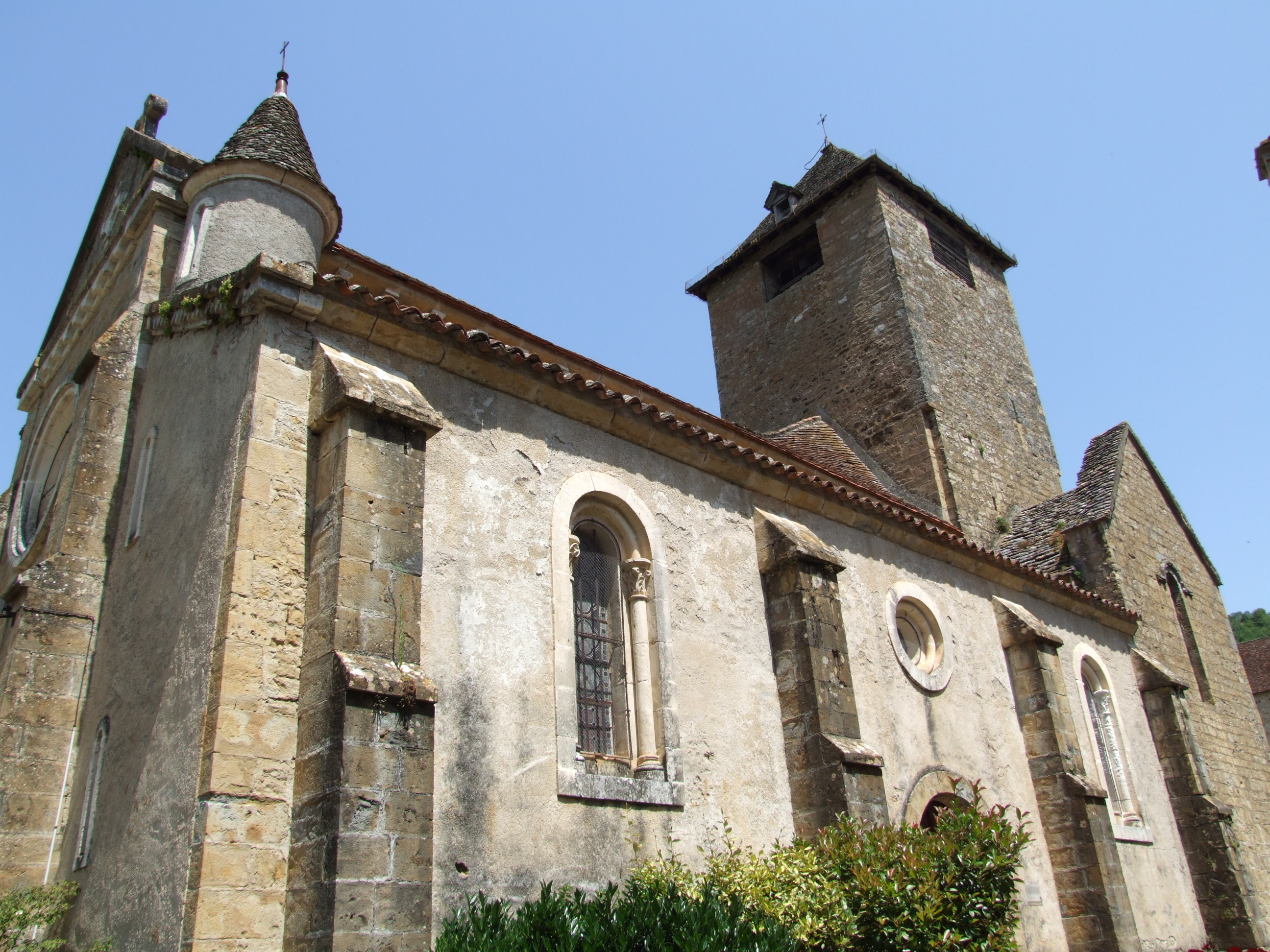
L'Église romane Saint-Pierre.

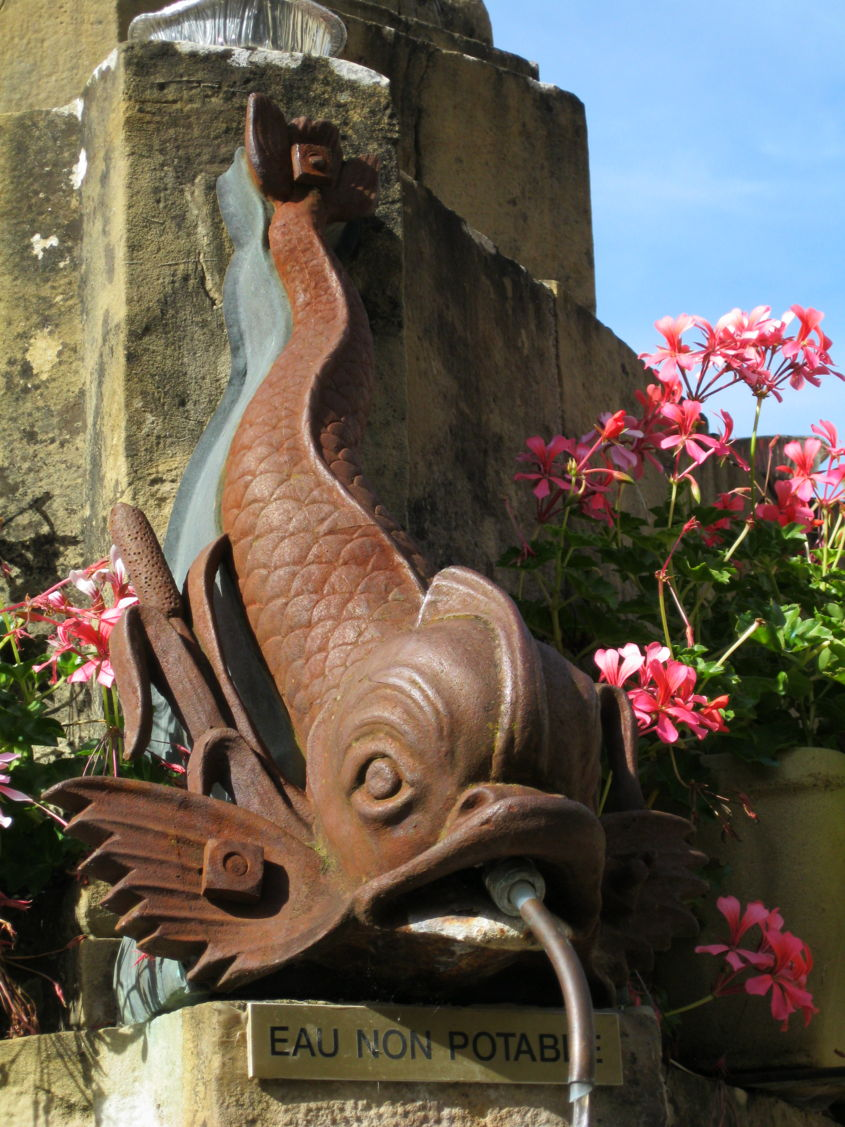
Village fountain.

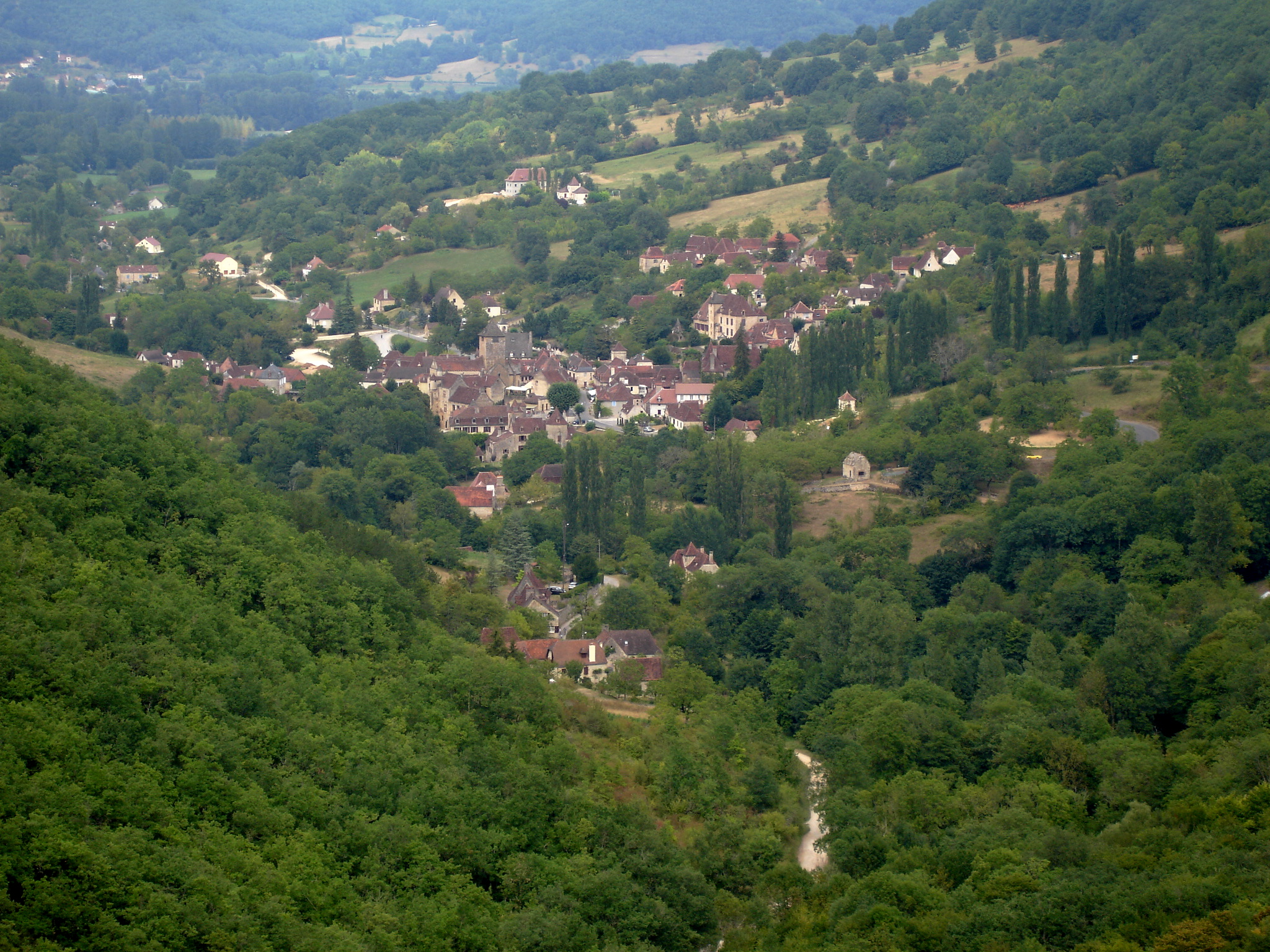
View of Autoire from Siran.

== See also ==
- Communes of the Lot department
