= Molières, Lot =

Molières
- Commune
- Location of Molières
- Location within France Location within Occitanie
- Coordinates: 44°47′41″N 1°56′09″E
- Country: France
- Region: Occitania
- Department: Lot
- Arrondissement: Figeac
- Canton: Saint-Céré
- Intercommunality: Grand-Figeac

Government
  - Mayor (2020–2026): Jean-Marie Laborie
- Area^{1}: 12.77 km^{2} (4.93 sq mi)
- Elevation: 540 m (1,770 ft)
- Highest elevation: 603 m (1,978 ft)
- Lowest elevation: 316 m (1,037 ft)
- Population (2023): 357
  - Density: 28.0/km^{2} (72.4/sq mi)
- Time zone: UTC+01:00 (CET)
  - Summer (DST): UTC+02:00 (CEST)
- INSEE/Postal code: 46195 /46120
- ^{1} French Land Register data, which excludes lakes, ponds, glaciers > 1 km^{2} (0.386 sq mi or 247 acres) and river estuaries.

Molières (French pronunciation: [mɔljɛʁ]; Occitan: Molièras) is a commune in the Lot department in south-western France.

== See also ==
- Communes of the Lot department
