= Frayssinhes =

- Commune
- Location of Frayssinhes
- Location within France Location within Occitanie
- Coordinates: 44°52′45″N 1°56′23″E
- Country: France
- Region: Occitania
- Department: Lot
- Arrondissement: Figeac
- Canton: Saint-Céré
- Intercommunality: Causses et Vallée de la Dordogne

Government
  - Mayor (2020–2026): Claudine Vivarez
- Area^{1}: 12.15 km^{2} (4.69 sq mi)
- Elevation: 340 m (1,120 ft)
- Highest elevation: 542 m (1,778 ft)
- Lowest elevation: 170 m (560 ft)
- Population (2023): 169
  - Density: 13.9/km^{2} (36.0/sq mi)
- Time zone: UTC+01:00 (CET)
  - Summer (DST): UTC+02:00 (CEST)
- INSEE/Postal code: 46115 /46400
- ^{1} French Land Register data, which excludes lakes, ponds, glaciers > 1 km^{2} (0.386 sq mi or 247 acres) and river estuaries.

Frayssinhes (French pronunciation: [fʁɛsiɲ]; Occitan: Fraissinhas) is a commune in the Lot department in south-western France.

Exposed to a mountain climate, it is drained by the Bave, the ruisseau des Calmettes and various other small streams. Part of the Dordogne basin, the commune has significant natural heritage, with three natural zones of ecological, faunistic and floristic interest.

Frayssinhes is a rural commune with a population of 165 in 2022, having reached a peak of 708 in 1851. It is part of the Biars-sur-Cère - Saint-Céré catchment area. Its inhabitants are called Frayssinhésiens or Frayssinhésiennes.

The population as of 2019 was 163.

== See also ==
- Communes of the Lot department
