= Saint-Paul-de-Vern =

- Commune
- Location of Saint-Paul-de-Vern
- Location within France Location within Occitanie
- Coordinates: 44°50′24″N 1°56′18″E
- Country: France
- Region: Occitania
- Department: Lot
- Arrondissement: Figeac
- Canton: Saint-Céré

Government
  - Mayor (2020–2026): Michel Landes
- Area^{1}: 10.84 km^{2} (4.19 sq mi)
- Elevation: 408 m (1,339 ft)
- Highest elevation: 473 m (1,552 ft)
- Lowest elevation: 167 m (548 ft)
- Population (2023): 171
  - Density: 15.8/km^{2} (40.9/sq mi)
- Time zone: UTC+01:00 (CET)
  - Summer (DST): UTC+02:00 (CEST)
- INSEE/Postal code: 46286 /46400
- ^{1} French Land Register data, which excludes lakes, ponds, glaciers > 1 km^{2} (0.386 sq mi or 247 acres) and river estuaries.

Saint-Paul-de-Vern (French pronunciation: [sɛ̃ pɔl də vɛʁn]; Languedocien: Sent Pau de Vèrn) is a commune in the Lot department in south-western France.

== See also ==
- Communes of the Lot department
