= Ladirat =

- Commune
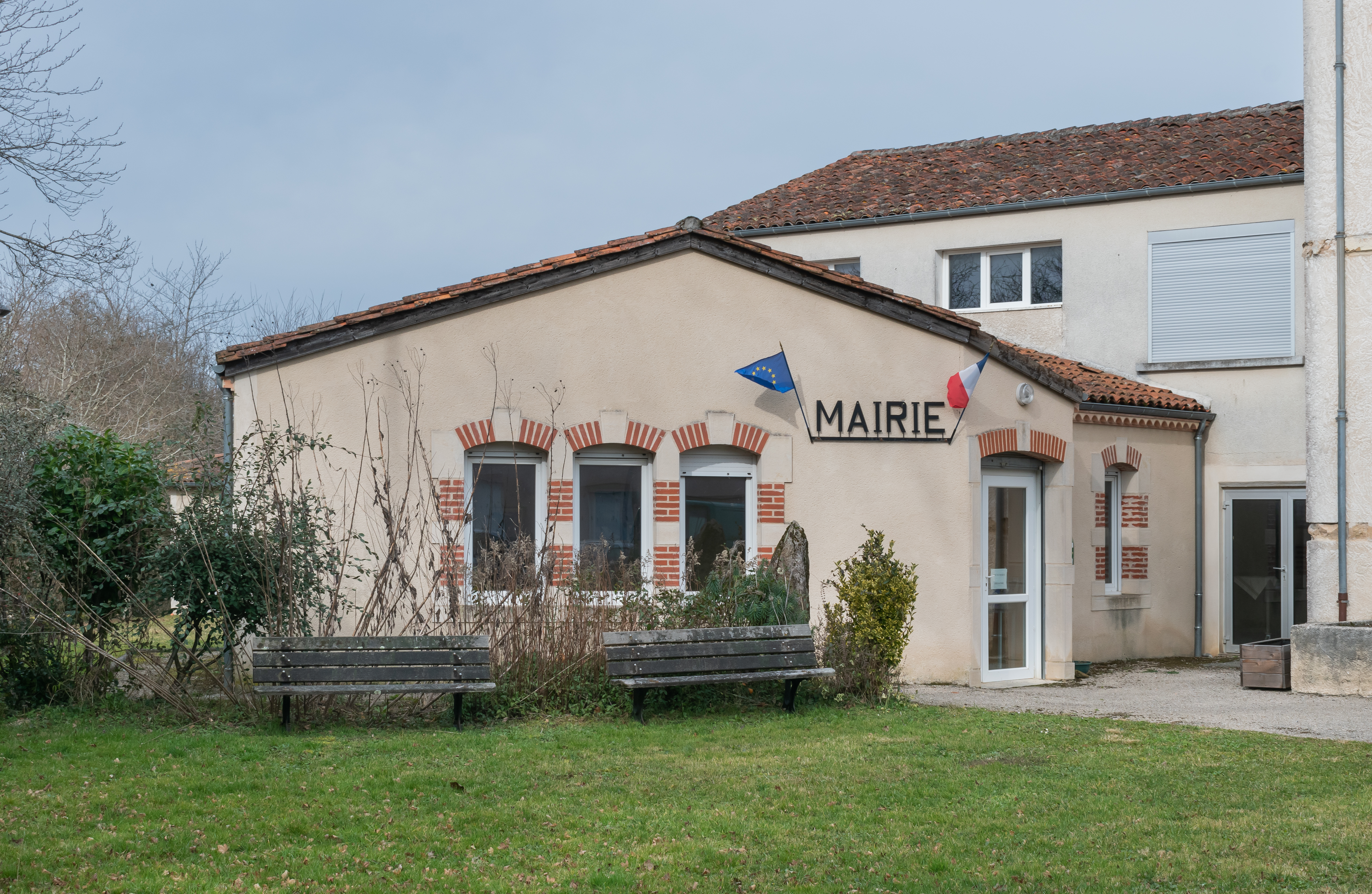
- Town hall of Ladirat
- Location of Ladirat
- Location within France Location within Occitanie
- Coordinates: 44°48′56″N 1°58′12″E
- Country: France
- Region: Occitania
- Department: Lot
- Arrondissement: Figeac
- Canton: Saint-Céré
- Intercommunality: Causses et Vallée de la Dordogne

Government
  - Mayor (2020–2026): Didier Saint-Maxent
- Area^{1}: 8.93 km^{2} (3.45 sq mi)
- Elevation: 476 m (1,562 ft)
- Highest elevation: 492 m (1,614 ft)
- Lowest elevation: 191 m (627 ft)
- Population (2023): 86
  - Density: 9.6/km^{2} (25/sq mi)
- Time zone: UTC+01:00 (CET)
  - Summer (DST): UTC+02:00 (CEST)
- INSEE/Postal code: 46146 /46400
- ^{1} French Land Register data, which excludes lakes, ponds, glaciers > 1 km^{2} (0.386 sq mi or 247 acres) and river estuaries.

Ladirat (French pronunciation: [ladiʁa]) is a commune in the Lot department in south-western France.

== See also ==
- Communes of the Lot department
