= Saignes, Lot =

Saignes
- Commune
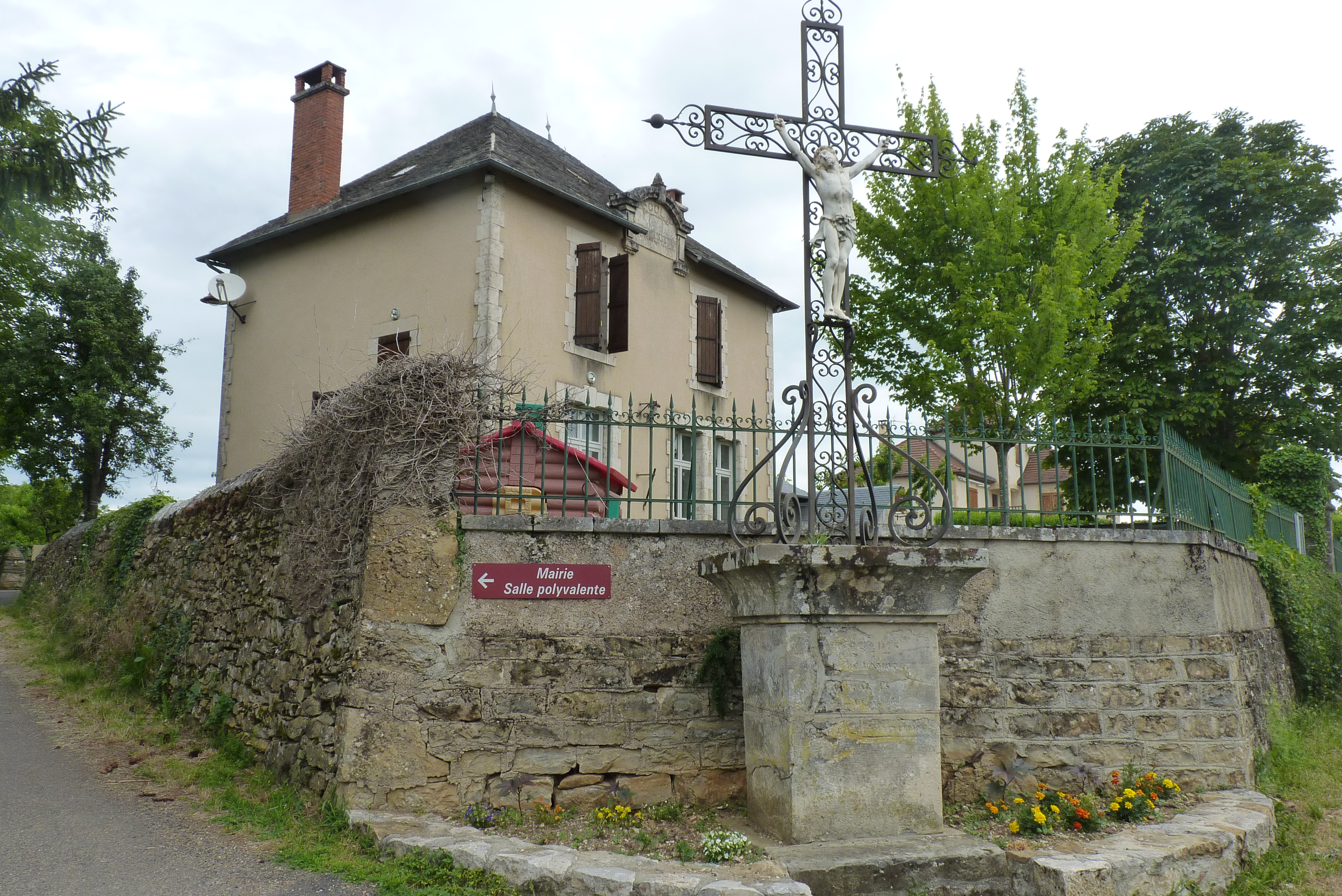
- Town hall
- Location of Saignes
- Location within France Location within Occitanie
- Coordinates: 44°47′19″N 1°49′02″E
- Country: France
- Region: Occitania
- Department: Lot
- Arrondissement: Figeac
- Canton: Saint-Céré
- Intercommunality: Causses et Vallée de la Dordogne

Government
  - Mayor (2020–2026): Dominique Malavergne
- Area^{1}: 3.55 km^{2} (1.37 sq mi)
- Elevation: 450 m (1,480 ft)
- Highest elevation: 441 m (1,447 ft)
- Lowest elevation: 325 m (1,066 ft)
- Population (2023): 74
  - Density: 21/km^{2} (54/sq mi)
- Time zone: UTC+01:00 (CET)
  - Summer (DST): UTC+02:00 (CEST)
- INSEE/Postal code: 46246 /46500
- ^{1} French Land Register data, which excludes lakes, ponds, glaciers > 1 km^{2} (0.386 sq mi or 247 acres) and river estuaries.

Saignes (French pronunciation: [sɛɲ]; Occitan: Sanhas) is a commune in the Lot department in south-western France.

== See also ==
- Communes of the Lot department
