= Bannes, Lot =

Bannes
- Commune
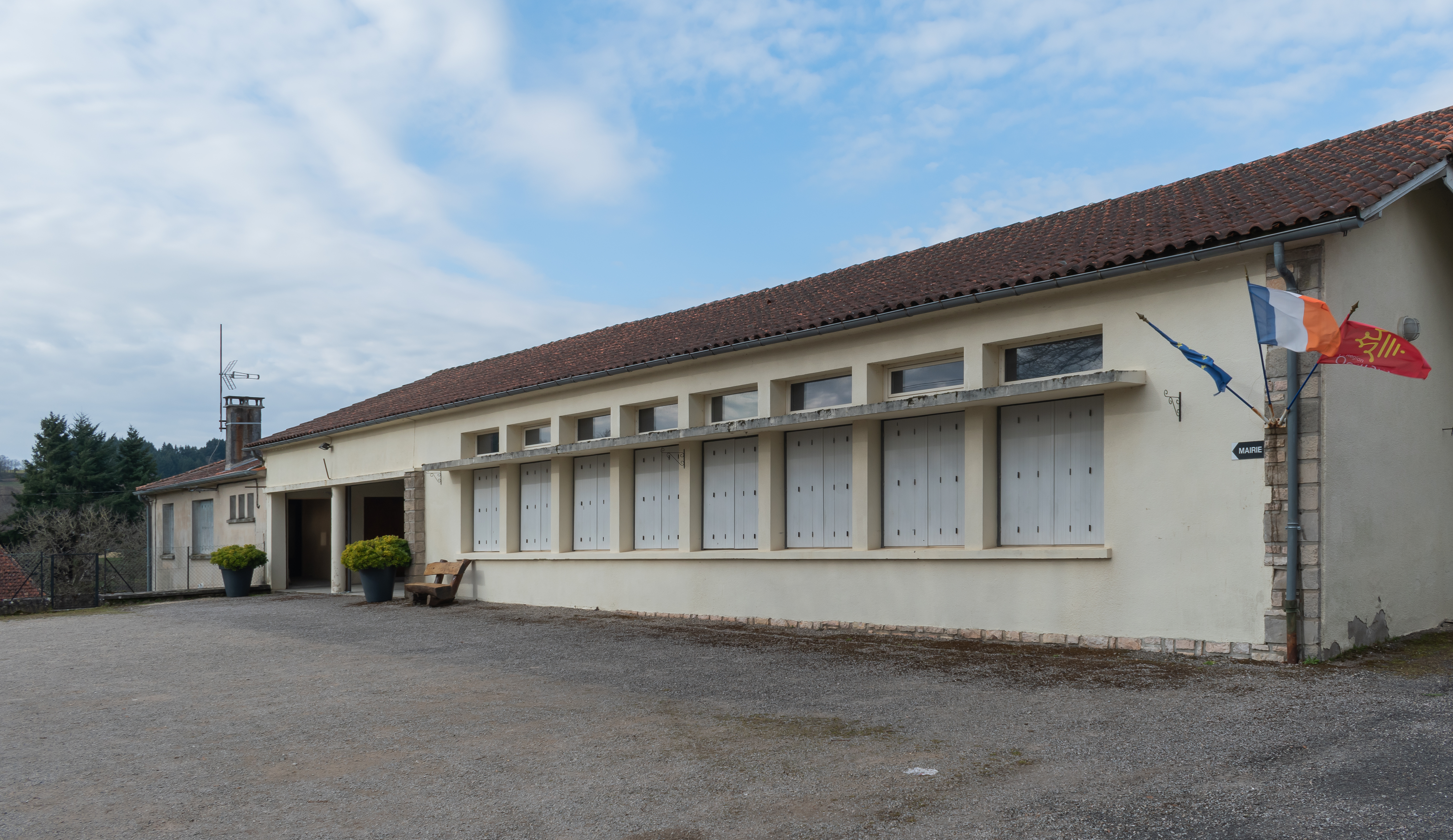
- Town hall of Bannes, Lot
- Location of Bannes
- Location within France Location within Occitanie
- Coordinates: 44°48′41″N 1°54′39″E
- Country: France
- Region: Occitania
- Department: Lot
- Arrondissement: Figeac
- Canton: Saint-Céré

Government
  - Mayor (2020–2026): Christian Larraufie
- Area^{1}: 10.11 km^{2} (3.90 sq mi)
- Elevation: 538 m (1,765 ft)
- Highest elevation: 595 m (1,952 ft)
- Lowest elevation: 272 m (892 ft)
- Population (2023): 143
  - Density: 14.1/km^{2} (36.6/sq mi)
- Time zone: UTC+01:00 (CET)
  - Summer (DST): UTC+02:00 (CEST)
- INSEE/Postal code: 46017 /46400
- ^{1} French Land Register data, which excludes lakes, ponds, glaciers > 1 km^{2} (0.386 sq mi or 247 acres) and river estuaries.

Bannes (French pronunciation: [ban]; Occitan: Banas) is a commune in the Lot department in southwestern France.

== Population ==
Historical population
Year	Pop.	±% p.a.
1968	234	—
1975	219	−0.94%
1982	196	−1.57%
1990	203	+0.44%
1999	166	−2.21%
2007	141	−2.02%
2012	128	−1.92%
2017	135	+1.07%
2023	143	+0.96%
Source: INSEE

== See also ==
- Communes of the Lot department
