= Château des Anglais (Autoire) =

Castle in Autoire, Lot, France

Coordinates: 44°51′4″N 1°48′50″E

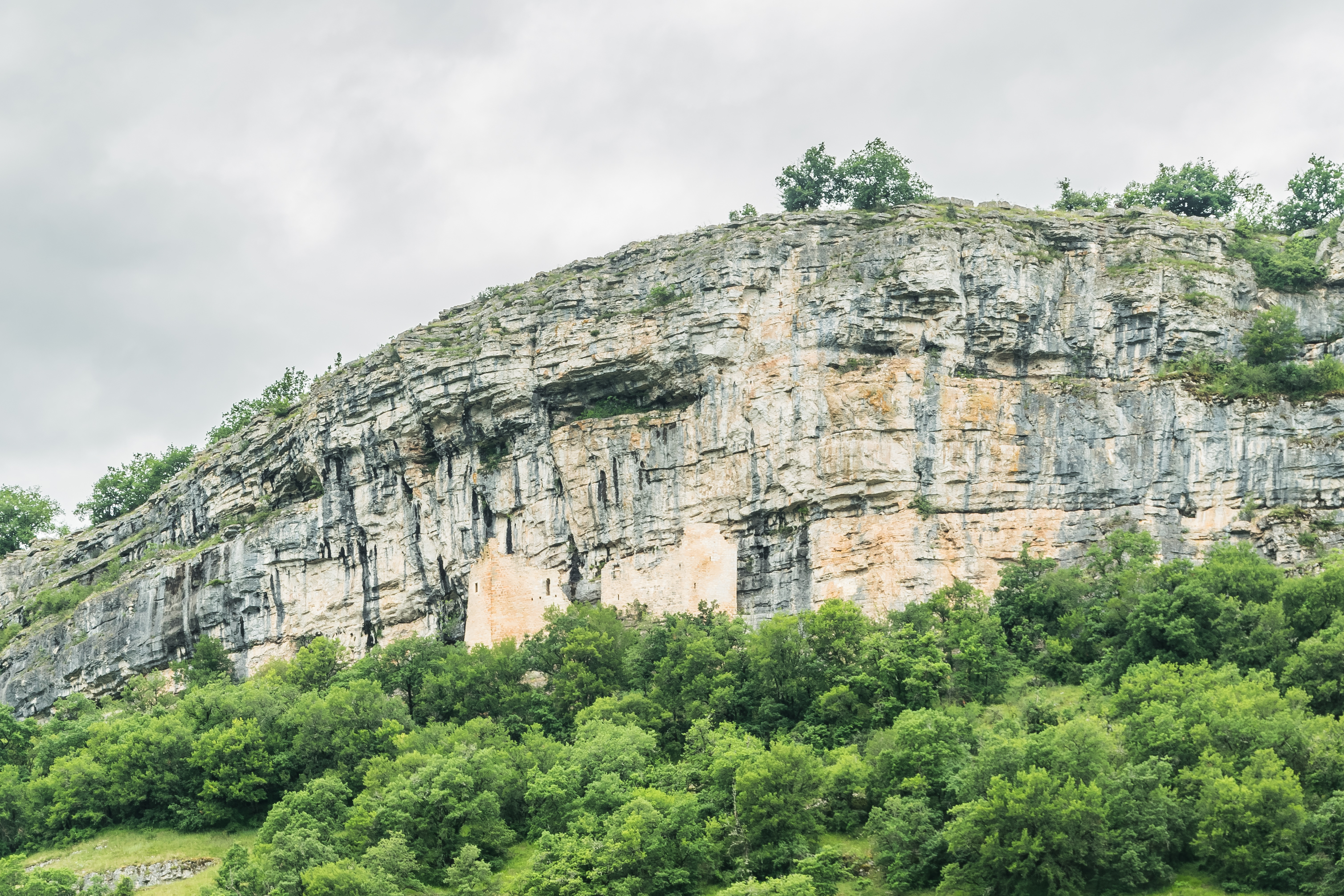
Ruins of the Chateau des Anglais, Autoire

The Château des Anglais is a castle in the commune of Autoire in the Lot département of France.

The castle extends under a rocky cliff, partially overhanging, which limits its area. The only remains are a roofless corps de logis with a turret. The castle continues to the east with a further corps de logis and turret. Together, they formed a sort of narrow, extended keep, stuck to the rock which forms its lower wall. The keep was surrounded by a fortified village, slightly lower, comprising 22 square houses. A wall made of large blocks of stone encircled the village. Apart from this enclosure, which could be older, the village and the castle show evidence of 11th and 12th centuries origins.

Parts of the site are privately owned and parts are the property of the commune. It has been listed since 1925 as a monument historique by the French Ministry of Culture.

== See also ==
- List of castles in France
