= Château des Anglais (Brengues) =

Ruined 12th-century castle in Lot, France

Coordinates: 44°35′11″N 1°49′52″E

The Château des Anglais is a ruined 12th century castle in the commune of Brengues in the Lot département of France. The ruins are privately owned. It has been listed since 1925 as a monument historique by the French Ministry of Culture.

== See also ==
- List of castles in France
