= Saint-Laurent-les-Tours =

- Commune
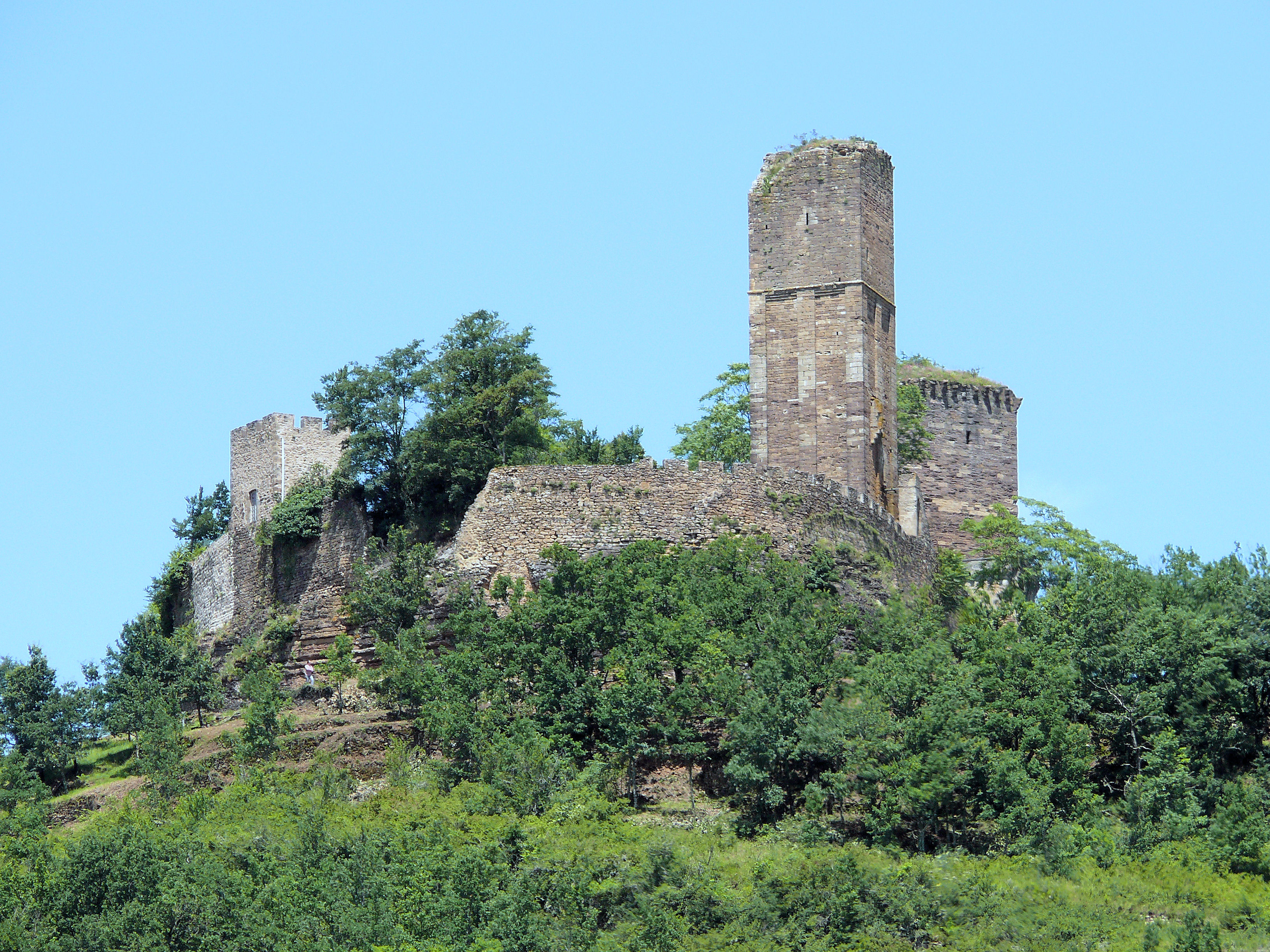
- The chateau of Saint-Laurent-les-Tours
- Location of Saint-Laurent-les-Tours
- Location within France Location within Occitanie
- Coordinates: 44°52′32″N 1°53′59″E
- Country: France
- Region: Occitania
- Department: Lot
- Arrondissement: Figeac
- Canton: Saint-Céré

Government
  - Mayor (2020–2026): Stéphanie Roussies
- Area^{1}: 10.84 km^{2} (4.19 sq mi)
- Elevation: 250 m (820 ft)
- Highest elevation: 465 m (1,526 ft)
- Lowest elevation: 152 m (499 ft)
- Population (2023): 868
  - Density: 80.1/km^{2} (207/sq mi)
- Time zone: UTC+01:00 (CET)
  - Summer (DST): UTC+02:00 (CEST)
- INSEE/Postal code: 46273 /46400
- ^{1} French Land Register data, which excludes lakes, ponds, glaciers > 1 km^{2} (0.386 sq mi or 247 acres) and river estuaries.

Saint-Laurent-les-Tours (French pronunciation: [sɛ̃ loʁɑ̃ le tuʁ]; Occitan: Sent Laurenç) is a commune in the Lot department in south-western France.

== See also ==
- Communes of the Lot department
