= Saint-Céré =

- Commune
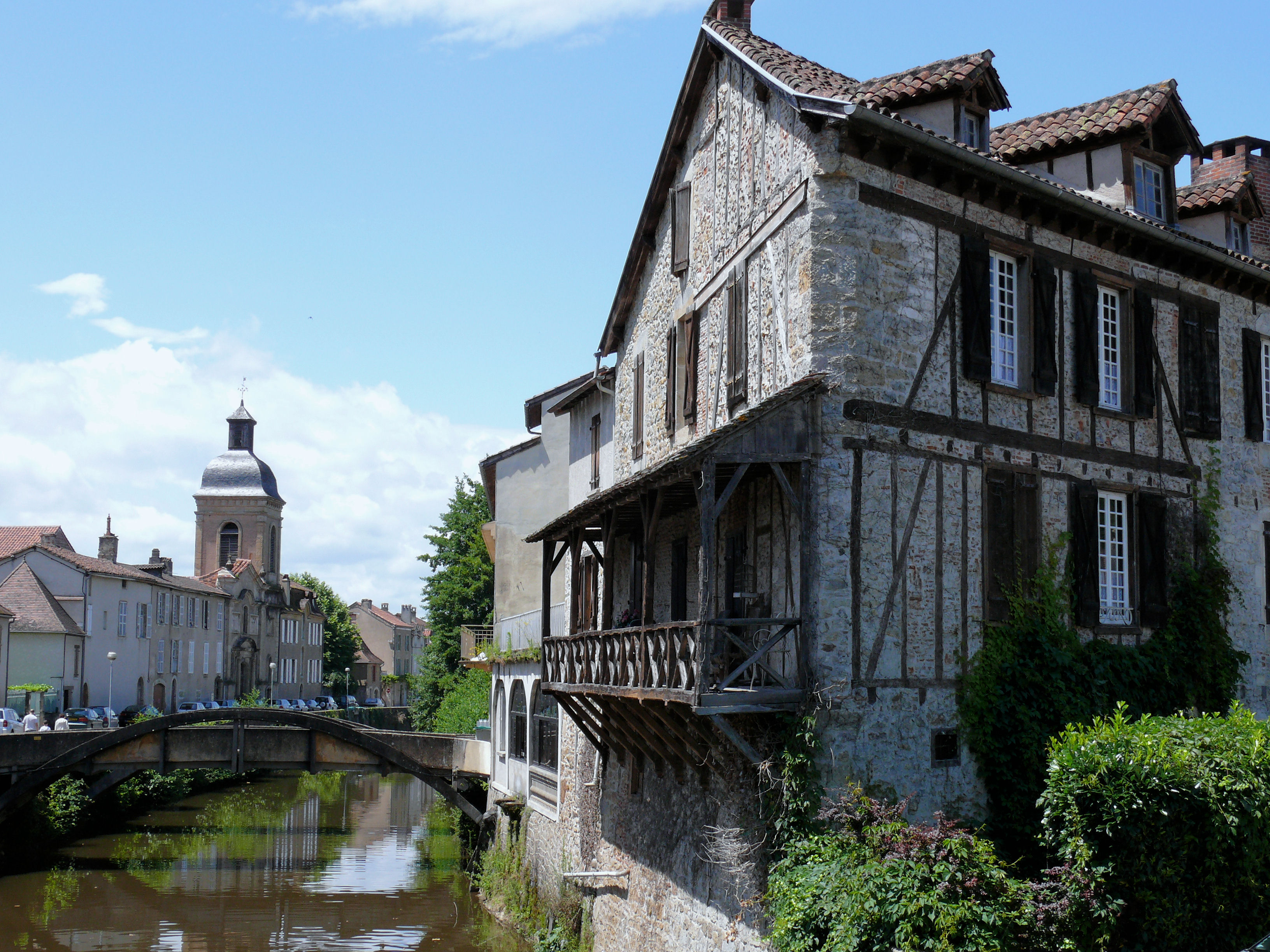
- La Bave and the Quai des Récollets

- Coat of arms
- Location of Saint-Céré
- Location within France Location within Occitanie
- Coordinates: 44°51′35″N 1°53′30″E
- Country: France
- Region: Occitania
- Department: Lot
- Arrondissement: Figeac
- Canton: Saint-Céré
- Intercommunality: Causses et Vallée de la Dordogne

Government
  - Mayor (2020–2026): Dominique Bizat
- Area^{1}: 11.33 km^{2} (4.37 sq mi)
- Elevation: 152 m (499 ft)
- Highest elevation: 523 m (1,716 ft)
- Lowest elevation: 141 m (463 ft)
- Population (2023): 3,429
  - Density: 302.6/km^{2} (783.9/sq mi)
- Time zone: UTC+01:00 (CET)
  - Summer (DST): UTC+02:00 (CEST)
- INSEE/Postal code: 46251 /46400
- ^{1} French Land Register data, which excludes lakes, ponds, glaciers > 1 km^{2} (0.386 sq mi or 247 acres) and river estuaries.

Saint-Céré (French pronunciation: [sɛ̃ seʁe]; Languedocien: Sant Seren) is a commune in the Lot department, southern France. The commune includes within its borders the castle of Saint-Laurent-les-Tours, where the artist Jean Lurçat lived and worked for many years, and from which he operated a secret radio for the French Resistance. The castle still houses a collection of his works.

== Toponymy ==
Saint-Céré is based on the Christian hagiotoponym of Serenus of Marseille.

During the French Revolution, the commune bore the name of Franc-Céré and Sen Céré (or Seu-Céré).

In Occitan, the name of the municipality is Sant Seren.

== History ==
The town's creation originates around the following legend. Spérie, the daughter of Serenus, the lord of the area around Saint-Cere, had dedicated herself to God. Around 760, Spérie was condemned by her brother Clarus and had her head cut off by him after she refused several requests to marry the neighbouring lord Ellidius, whom Clarus was in dispute with, and whom she regarded as a pagan. She stood up, retrieved her head, and went to wash it in a clear spring. A chapel was built to house the location of her tomb, and to accommodate the pilgrims who came in crowds. The chapel became a church in the 11th century.

In 1178, the lord of the land around the town, vassals of Auvergne, became the vassals of the Viscount of Turenne until 1738. The Turenne's granted various charters to the town giving it privileges and rights starting in 1292 and again in 1464, 1490, and 1642. The charter of 1464 allowed the town to be run by consuls and the right to build a town wall, gates, and moats.

During the Hundred Year's War, the English kings controlled the town in 1259 and 1290 as the Turennes aligned themselves with the former. And from 1369 until 1378, the town was controlled by routiers under Bernard de la Salle. In the French Wars of Religion, it was briefly besieged and occupied by Protestant forces in 1574. By the 1700s, the town roads and squares were enlarged, quays built, and the walls torn down. In 1738, the Viscounty of Turenne, and its towns including Saint Cere, and lands were sold to pay a debt, and bought by and returned to, the control of the king of France. During the French Revolution, the department of the Lot was created in 1790, and the town briefly became one of six district towns and called Cere-la-Montagne.

== Geography ==
=== Location ===
The town is located in the centre of a small metropolitan area, in the Quercy, northeast of the Causse de Gramat and west of Segala, between Lacapelle-Marival and Bretenoux, in the valley of the Bave, tributary of the Dordogne river, and on the northern edge of the Limargue. It is the city-centre of the urban unit of Saint-Céré.

Located at the crossroad of the routes to Limousin, Auvergne and Quercy, Saint-Céré is a sought after place to stay due to its location and an excellent point of departure for many walks and excursions in the Haut-Quercy.

=== Hydrography ===
The Bave river, a tributary of the Dordogne, flows through the town.

=== Geology and relief ===
The area of the commune is 1,133 hectares; its altitude varies from 141 to 523 meters.

At the town hall, the altitude of Saint-Céré is 155 meters. It rises from 141 meters at Bave river to 523 meters in the southern part of the commune.

=== Climate ===
Saint-Céré has the distinction of being at the junction of the three types of temperate climates: there is a Temperate Oceanic climate, with Mediterranean and Continental influences, characterised by a dry and hot summer, a sunny autumn, a mild winter. In the shelter of the foothills of the Massif Central, the Vent d'Autan is here moderate.

== Population ==
Historical population
Year	Pop.	±% p.a.
1968	3,926	—
1975	4,089	+0.58%
1982	4,056	−0.12%
1990	3,760	−0.94%
1999	3,515	−0.75%
2007	3,560	+0.16%
2012	3,540	−0.11%
2017	3,462	−0.44%
2023	3,429	−0.16%
Source: INSEE

== Local culture and heritage ==
- La place du Mercadial, its fountain and the 15th century Consuls' House, which was declared a historic monument in 1991
- L'hôtel de Puymule, 15th-century, was listed as a historical monument in 1929
- L'hôtel de Miramon
- La maison consulaire
- Several wood-panelled houses
- Église Sainte-Spérie, dating from the 10th century, inscribed as a historical monument in 1979
- Église des Récollets, 17th century, listed as a historic monument in 1973
- Statue of Marshal Canrobert
- Statue of Charles Bourseul (1924) by Giovanni Pinotti Cipriani (also sculptor of the monument to the dead in the square of the Place de la République)
- Château de Montal, 14th-century, listed as a historical monument in 1909. The domain is partly located in the commune of Saint-Jean-Lespinasse.

== See also ==
- Communes of the Lot department
