= List of French scientists =

This is a list of notable French scientists.

== A ==
- José Achache (20th-21st centuries), geophysicist and ecologist
- Jean le Rond d'Alembert (1717–1783), mathematician, mechanician, physicist and philosopher
- Claude Allègre (1937–2025), geochemist
- Lucile Allorge (born 1937), botanist
- André-Marie Ampère (1775–1836), physicist and mathematician
- Camille Arambourg (1885–1969), vertebrate palaeontologist.
- Françoise Ardré (1931–2010), phycologist, marine scientist
- Alain Aspect (born 1947), physicist

== B ==
- Louis Bachelier (1870–1946), mathematician
- Antoine Jérôme Balard (1802–1876), chemist
- Éliane Basse (1899–1985), paleontologist and geologist
- Pierre-Dominique Bazaine (1786–1838), mathematician and engineer
- Jean de Beaurain (1696–1771), geographer
- Antoine César Becquerel (1788–1878), electrochemist
- Edmond Becquerel (1820–1891), physicist
- Henri Becquerel (1852–1908), physicist and Nobel laureate
- Jean Becquerel (1878–1953), physicist
- Léon Bence (1929–1987), physician
- Jacques Benoit (1896–1982), physician, biologist and neuroendocrinologist
- Claude Bernard (1813–1878), physiologist
- Marcellin Berthelot (1827–1907), chemist, opponent of vitalism
- Claude Louis Berthollet (1748–1822), chemist
- Julien Bessières (1777–1840), physician, diplomat, and member of the Egyptian Institute of Sciences and Arts
- Alfred Binet (1857–1911), psychologist who invented the first practical IQ test
- Prosper-René Blondlot (1849–1930), physicist
- Pierre Boiteau (1911–1980), botanist
- Jean Bosler (1878–1973), astronomer
- Marcellin Boule (1861–1942), palaeontologist, geologist, and anthropologist
- Claude Bourgelat (1712–1779), veterinary surgeon
- Thomas Bourgeron (born 1965), neuroscientist
- Jean-Baptiste Boussingault (1801–1887), chemist
- Gerard Brachet (born 1944), space scientist
- Paul Broca (1824–1880), physician, surgeon, anatomist, and anthropologist
- Louis de Broglie (1892–1987), physicist
- Bernard Brunhes (1867–1910), physicist
- Georges-Louis Leclerc, Comte de Buffon (1707–1788), naturalist and mathematician

== C ==
- Bernard Cabane (born 1945), physicist and chemist
- Pierre Jean George Cabanis (1757–1808), physiologist
- Albert Calmette (1863–1933), physician, bacteriologist and immunologist
- Georges Canguilhem (1904–1995), physician and philosopher
- Nicolas Léonard Sadi Carnot (1796–1832), physicist and military engineer
- Élie Cartan (1869–1951), mathematician
- Henri Cartan (1904–2008), mathematician
- Augustin-Louis Cauchy (1789–1857), mathematician and physicist
- Jean-François Champollion (1790–1832), philologist
- Jean-Pierre Changeux (born 1936), neurochemist
- Georges Charpak (1924–2010), physicist, Nobel prize winner 1992
- Georges Charpy (1865–1945), physicist and metallurgist
- Henry Louis Le Chatelier (1850–1936), chemist known for Le Chatelier's principle
- Albert Châtelet (1883–1960), mathematician
- Émilie du Châtelet (1706–1749), mathematician and physicist
- Jean Mathieu de Chazelles (1657–1710), professor of hydrography
- Michel Che (1941–2019), chemist
- Daniel Choquet (born 1962), neuroscientist
- Gustave Choquet (1915–2006), mathematician
- Yvonne Choquet-Bruhat (1923–2025), mathematician
- Charles Pierre Claret de Fleurieu (1738–1810), explorer, hydrographer and politician
- Alain Connes (born 1947), mathematician; Fields Medalist 1982
- Louis Couffignal (1902–1966), mathematician and cybernetician
- Charles-Augustin de Coulomb (1736–1806), physicist, discoverer of Coulomb's law
- Vincent Courtillot (born 1948), geophysicist
- Jacques-Yves Cousteau (1910–1997), oceanographer
- Philippe Cousteau (1940–1979), oceanographer
- Jean-Marie-Joseph Coutelle (1748–1835), engineer, scientist and pioneer of ballooning
- Adam de Craponne (1526–1576), engineer who implemented the Canal de Craponne in 1559
- Jean Cruveilhier (1791–1874), anatomist and pathologist
- Marie Curie (1867–1934), physicist and chemist, two Nobel Prizes, in physics (1903) and chemistry (1911)
- Pierre Curie (1859–1906), physicist and chemist, Nobel Prize in physics (1903)
- Georges Cuvier (1769–1832), regarded as the founding father of palaeontology
- Boris Cyrulnik (born 1937), ethologist, neurologist, and psychiatrist

== D ==
- Thomas-François Dalibard (1709–1778), physicist and botanist
- Henry Darcy (1803–1858), hydraulic engineer
- Michel Darluc (1717–1783), naturalist
- Raymond Daudel (1920–2006), quantum chemist
- Jean Dausset (1916–2009), biologist, Nobel prize winner 1980
- Suzanne Débarbat (1928–2024), astronomer and historian of science and technology
- André-Louis Debierne (1874–1949), chemist
- Jean Baptiste Joseph Delambre (1749–1822), mathematician and astronomer
- Marcel Deprez (1843–1918), electrical engineer
- John Theophilus Desaguliers (1683–1744), natural philosopher (physicist)
- Guillaume Delisle (1675–1726), cartographer
- Girard Desargues (1591–1661), mathematician
- René Descartes (1596–1650), scientist and philosopher
- Robert Debré (1882–1978), physician
- Roland Douce (1939–2018), plant biologist
- Jean-Baptiste du Hamel (1624–1706), natural philosopher (physicist)
- Émilien Dumas (1804–1873), palaeontologist, and geologist
- Jean-Baptiste Dumas (1800–1884), chemist
- Charles François Dupuis (1742–1809), polymath and theologian

== F ==
- Pierre Fauchard (1679–1761), physician, "the father of modern dentistry"
- Hervé Faye (1814–1902), astronomer
- Pierre de Fermat (1607–1665), mathematician
- Louis Feuillée (1660–1732), explorer, astronomer, geographer, and botanist
- Jacqueline Ficini (1923-1988), known for developing the synthetic chemistry of ynamine
- Bernard Foing (20–21st century), astronomer
- Léon Foucault (1819–1868), physicist
- Pierre Fourmanoir (1924–2007), ichthyologist
- Joseph Fourier (1768–1830), mathematician and physicist
- Augustin-Jean Fresnel (1788–1827), physicist known for work on optics

== G ==
- Pierre-Gilles de Gennes (1932–2007), mathematician and physicist, Nobel Prize in physics 1991
- Sophie Germain (1776–1831) mathematician, physicist and philosopher.
- Paul Gervais (1816–1879), palaeontologist and entomologist
- Jacques Géry (1917–2007), ichthyologist
- Mirko Grmek (1924–2000), historian of medicine
- Alexander Grothendieck (1928–2014), mathematician; Fields Medalist 1966 (German-born)
- Camille Guérin (1872–1961), biologist
- André Guinier (1911–2000), physicist

== H ==
- Jacques Hadamard (1865–1963), mathematician
- Armand Havet (1795–1820), botanist
- Victor Henri (1872–1940), physical chemist and physiologist
- Charles Hermite (1822–1901), mathematician
- Catherine Hill (born 1946), epidemiologist and biostatistician
- Étienne Hubert d'Orléans (1567–1614), Arabist

== J ==
- François Jacob (1920–2013), biologist, Nobel prize winner 1965
- Charles Janet (1849–1932), chemist and biologist
- Paul Janet (1823–1899), philosopher
- Irène Joliot-Curie (1897–1956), physicist, Nobel Prize winner 1935
- Frédéric Joliot-Curie (1900–1958), physicist, Nobel Prize winner 1935
- Jean Jouzel (born 1947), glaciologist and climatologist
- Gaston Julia (1893–1978), mathematician

== K ==
- Nicole El Karoui (born 1944), mathematician
- Robert Kühner (1903–1996), mycologist
- Jean Kuntzmann (1912–1992), mathematician

== L ==
- Michel de La Vigne (1588–1648), physician
- Yves Lacoste (born 1929), geographer and geopolitician
- Laurent Lafforgue (born 1966), mathematician; Fields Medalist 2002
- Frédéric de Lafresnaye (1783–1861), ornithologist
- Joseph Louis Lagrange (1736–1813), mathematician
- Jean Laherrère (born 1931), consultant and petroleum engineer
- Claude François Lallemand (1790–1854), physician and pathologist
- Jean-Baptiste Lamarck (1744–1829), evolutionary biologist
- Paul Langevin (1872–1946), physicist
- Pierre-Simon Laplace (1749–1827), mathematician and physicist
- François-de-Paule Latapie (1739–1823), botanist
- Lucien Laubier (1936–2008), oceanographer
- René Lavocat (1909–2007), paleontologist
- Antoine Lavoisier (1743–1794), chemist
- Michel Lazdunski (born 1938), biochemist
- Eliane Le Breton (1897–1977), physiologist
- Xavier Le Pichon (1937–2025), geophysicist
- Alfred Legoyt (1812–1885), statistician
- Jean-Marie Lehn (born 1939), chemist, Nobel prize 1987
- Jean-Marc Lévy-Leblond (born 1940), physicist
- Claude Lévi-Strauss (1908–2009), anthropologist
- Arnoult de Lisle (1556–1613), Arabist and physician
- Pierre-Louis Lions (born 1956), mathematician; Fields Medalist 1994
- Edmond Locard (1877–1966), pioneer of forensic science
- André Lwoff (1902–1994), biologist, Nobel prize 1965

== M ==
- Marguerite Macaigne (1908–2000), physicist in Marie Curie's laboratory
- Jean-Michel Macron (born 1950), neurologist
- Charles Madic (1942–2008), radiochemist
- Jean-Jacques d'Ortous de Mairan (1678–1771), geophysicist, astronomer and chronobiologist
- Benoit Mandelbrot (1924–2010), mathematician
- Pierre Louis Maupertuis (1698–1759), mathematician and philosopher
- Prosper Ménière (1799–1862), doctor concerned with hearing loss and tinnitus
- Marin Mersenne (1588–1648), mathematician
- Charles Messier (1730–1817), astronomer
- André Michaux (1746–1802), botanist and explorer
- François André Michaux (1770–1855), botanist
- Jean-Louis Michel (born 1945), oceanographer and engineer
- Alphonse Milne-Edwards (1835–1900), mammalologist and ornithologist
- Henri Milne-Edwards (1800–1885), zoologist
- Abraham de Moivre (1667–1754), mathematician
- Jacques Monod (1910–1976), biologist, Nobel prize winner 1965
- Théodore Monod (1902–2000), naturalist and theologian
- Gabriel Mouton (1618–1694), mathematician and astronomer

== N–O ==
- Adolphe-Simon Neboux (1806–1844), surgeon and naturalist
- Louis Néel (1904–2000), physicist, Nobel Prize 1970
- André Niederlender (1890–1959), archaeologist
- Jean de Noailles (1739–1824), chemist
- Jean-Baptiste Noulet (1802–1890), archaeologist
- Hélène Olivier-Bourbigou (born 1962), chemist

== P–Q ==
- Henri Padé (1863–1953), mathematician
- Paul Painlevé (1863–1933), mathematician and statesman
- Denis Papin (1647–1713), physicist, mathematician, and inventor
- Blaise Pascal (1623–1662), mathematician and philosopher
- Étienne Pascal (1588–1651), mathematician
- Louis Pasteur (1822–1895), microbiologist and chemist
- Jean Pecquet (1622–1674), psychologist
- Jean-Marie Pelt (1933–2015), botanist
- Jocelyne Pérard (born 1940), geographer
- Jean Robert Petit (21st century), paleoclimatologist
- Alphonse Pinart (1852–1911), philologist
- Gilles Pisier (born 1950), mathematician
- Hippolyte Pixii (1808–1835), inventor
- Henri Poincaré (1854–1912), mathematician and physicist
- Lucien Poincaré (1862–1920), physicist
- Siméon Poisson (1781–1840), mathematician and physicist
- Pierre Poivre (1719–1786), horticulturist and botanist
- Angèle Pompéi (1898–1990), physicist and chemist, friend of Irène Curie
- Albéric Pont (1870–1960), dentist and pioneer in maxillofacial surgery
- Alberte Pullman (1920–2011), quantum chemist
- Bernard Pullman (1919–1996), quantum chemist
- Lucien Quélet (1832–1899), naturalist and mycologist

== R ==
- Petrus Ramus (1515–1572), mathematician and logician
- Louis-Antoine Ranvier (1835–1922), physician, pathologist, anatomist and histologist
- Didier Raoult (born 1952), microbiologist and virologist
- René Antoine Ferchault de Réaumur (1683–1757), entomologist
- Jacques Ricard (1929–2018), biochemist
- Jean-Baptiste Robinet (1735–1820), naturalist
- Antoine Georges Roederer (born 1943), engineer and scientist
- Paul Rohmer (1876–1977), physician
- Michel Rolle (1652–1719), mathematician
- Henri Romagnesi (1912–1999), mycologist
- Jean Rostand (1894–1977), biologist and philosopher
- Louis Rougier (1889–1982), mathematician, physicist, and philosopher

== S ==
- Nicolas Sarrabat (1698–1739), mathematician concerned with many aspects of science
- Henri Émile Sauvage (1842–1917), ichthyologist, paleontologist, and herpetologist
- Conrad Schlumberger (1878–1936), geophysicist
- Marcel Schlumberger (1884–1953), geophysicist
- Laurent Schwartz (1915–2002), mathematician; Fields Medalist 1950
- Géraud Sénizergues (born 1957), computer scientist and 2002 Gödel Prize recipient.
- Jean-Pierre Serre (born 1926), mathematician; Fields Medalist 1954
- Marie-Odile Soyer-Gobillard (born 1939), biologist, CNRS director

== T ==
- Michel Talagrand (born 1952), mathematician
- Jules Tannery (1848–1910), mathematician
- Auguste Ambroise Tardieu (1818–1879), forensic medical scientist
- Haroun Tazieff (1914–1998), volcanologist and geologist
- Daniel Tauvry (1669–1701), physician
- Fabiola Terzi (20–21st century), physician-scientist
- Melchisédech Thévenot (c. 1620–1692), inventor of the spirit level
- Adrien-Jean-Pierre Thilorier (1790–1844), discoverer of dry ice
- Françoise Thom (born 1951), historian
- René Thom (1923–2002), mathematician; Fields Medal 1958
- Muriel Thomasset (born 1971), physicist
- Pierre-Marie-Jérôme Trésaguet (1716–1796), engineer and road builder

== V–Y ==
- Georges Valiron (1884–1955), mathematician
- Jean-Pierre Vernant (1914–2007), historian
- Jean-Christophe Victor (1947–2016), geographer
- Paul-Émile Victor (1907–1995), ethnologist
- François Viète (1540–1603), mathematician
- Louis Pierre Vieillot (1748–1830), ornithologist
- Charles Athanase Walckenaer (1771–1852), geographer
- Adrienne Weill (1903–1979), physicist
- Marthe Weiss (1885–1953), physicist
- Wendelin Werner (born 1968), mathematician; Fields Medalist 2006 (German-born)
- Marie Henriette Wibratte (1911–1944), physicist
- Lucienne Wisner (1903–1940), physicist
- Rachid Yazami (born 1953), engineer and inventor
- Jean-Christophe Yoccoz (1957–2016), mathematician; Fields Medalist 1994

== See also ==
- List of French people
- Lists of scientists

tr:Fransız bilim adamları listesi
