= François-de-Paule Latapie =

French botanist

François Paul Latapie,
- Born: 8 July 1739; Bordeaux, France
- Died: 8 October 1823 (aged 84); Bordeaux, France
- Other names: François-de-Paule Latapie
- Education: University of Bordeaux (Saint-André hospital)
- Known for: Topographic map of Pompeii, many contributions to botany
- Scientific career
- Fields: Botany
- Patrons: Montesquieu, Louis XV, Duke of La Rochefoucauld, Philibert Trudaine de Montigny
- Author abbrev. (botany): Latap.

François Paul Latapie, also known as François-de-Paule Latapie (8 July 1739, Bordeaux – 8 October 1823, Bordeaux) was a French botanist. He was a man of the Enlightenment, philanthropist, Hellenist, inspector of manufactures of the province of Guyenne, naturalist, traveler and man of letters, and founder of the Rosière prize de La Brède, which commemorates Montesquieu every year since 1823.

== Life ==
François Paul Latapie was the son of Pierre Latapie, notary feudal surveyor in La Brède, and Thérèse Berthonieu. His family had been called there by Jacques de Secondat at the end of the 17th century. He spent his childhood in La Brède where his father was employed by the philosopher Montesquieu, baron of La Brède and Montesquieu. He entered the philosopher's entourage at a young age, following him on his walks and sometimes helping him in his research. He was familiar with the Château de La Brède, where he visited the garden and the library daily. He was fifteen when Montesquieu died in Paris.

He devoted himself to the study of ancient languages, history and the exact sciences. His progress was such that he was able to teach what he had just learned, and he was entrusted with the education of the philosopher's grandson, Charles Louis de Secondat.

The young François de Paule Latapie benefited from the protection networks of the Montesquieu family, and he was the secretary of Montesquieu's son, Jean-Baptiste de Secondat.

== Education in Bordeaux and Paris ==
Latapie left La Brède and went to Bordeaux in 1757. There he studied anatomy with the major surgeon of the Saint-André hospital, Jean Dupuy, at whose request he translated from English the treatise on the theory and practice of childbirth written by the obstetrician William Smellie.

In the period 1766–1770 he acquired a solid scientific training in Paris. He took the physics course of Abbé Jean-Antoine Nollet, the chemist Guillaume-François Rouelle, the anatomist Antoine Petit and the botanist Bernard de Jussieu. At the same time he acted as tutor to the children of the intendant of finances Charles Robert Boutin.

Montesquieu's son Jean-Baptiste de Secondat was reluctant to publish his father's unpublished texts, which in some cases were unfinished. In 1767, the publication of the Lettres familières du président de Montesquieu (Familiar letters of the president of Montesquieu) exchanged between Montesquieu and the Abbé de Guasco triggered a scandal because it implicated Madame Geoffrin. Montesquieu's son sought the advice of Latapie, who advised him not to publish them. It was not until 1783 that Jean-Baptiste de Secondat agreed to publish a small book of posthumous works.

== Journey to England (1770) ==
Thanks to a scholarship granted by Louis XV on the recommendation of the Duke of La Rochefoucauld, he travelled to England between February and June 1770. On his return he actively promoted the aesthetics of the English garden on the continent, with his translation and comments on Thomas Whately's book Observations on modern gardening.

== Journey to Italy (1774-1777) ==
He became a member of the Academy of Bordeaux in 1773 and obtained in 1774 the promise of a position as inspector of arts and manufactures of Guyenne.

Thanks to the protection of Philibert Trudaine de Montigny, Latapie undertook a long journey in the Italian peninsula between 1774 and 1777. During this he corresponded in particular with Jean-Baptiste de Secondat and sent memoirs to the Bordeaux Academy. The fourteen notebooks of his travel diary in Italy, which he called Éphémérides, have recently been found in the family archives: they have enabled researchers, in particular Gilles Montègre, to characterize the international circulations associated with the scholarly and diplomatic networks of the Europe of the Enlightenment.

At the beginning of his journey Latapie met Johann III Bernoulli who was also on a journey to Italy. They sailed together in the Mediterranean, stopping off in Nice, which they left on January 29, 1775, to go to Savona, where they lived until February 2 before continuing to Genoa. In Italy Latapie met many scholars and diplomats. He stayed twice in Rome, in 1775 and in 1776.

In Rome, he met the religious mathematician François Jacquier, the Abbé Correia, secretary of the Academy of Lisbon, and Jean Demeste, surgeon, mineralogist and botanist. In Naples he met the British ambassador William Hamilton, who asked him to edit the French translation of his work Campi Phlegræi.

During his trip he became a member of the Academy of Arcades in Rome, of the academies of Padua and Florence and of several Italian learned societies.

Latapie was a precise observer. All the objects that caught his eye were the subject of precise notes. The density and precision of Latapie's Ephemerides also documents Italy's participation in the Enlightenment movement.

In 1776, he was the first to produce a topographic map of the excavations of the ancient city of Pompeii "from memory", at a time when the Neapolitan monarchy prohibited visitors from taking notes on the site. The innovative nature of this plan and the description of the remains associated with it have been highlighted by archaeologists and historians of science.

He met Voltaire in Ferney on his way back.

== Career in Bordeaux before 1789 ==
He was elected a member of the Bordeaux Academy of Sciences in 1775, to which he transmitted his account of the excavations of Pompeii. He distinguished himself then by his lectures, his public courses in botany, attended by the botanist Jean Thore, amongst others, and his publications on the practical culture of gardens.

He was Inspector General of Arts and Manufactures of Guyenne from 1777, and in this capacity he made three inspection tours in Guyenne, in 1778, 1782 and 1789, about which he wrote journals.

He gave lessons in botany from 1780. He was commissioned by the intendant Nicolas-François Dupré de Saint-Maur to "form a field for the study of vine varieties", whereupon he studied the countless varieties of vines grown in the region, their origins and their hybridizations. This field was destroyed during the Revolution.

He was one of the associates in the founding of the cultural society called Le Musée de Bordeaux founded in 1783, and created the garden of plants of Bordeaux. A botanist trained by Bernard de Jussieu, he adopted the Linnaean classification of species while in Rome. The academy commissioned him to demonstrate botany in the garden of plants. He wrote studies on the plants of Gironde: Hortus burdigalensis in 1784. He gave his lessons there until the Revolution, which were followed by students in medicine and pharmacy as well as amateurs of all ages. He wrote a Description of the town of Brède, in 1786.

He was appointed judge adviser to the Admiralty Court of Guyenne in 1788.

== Career in Bordeaux after 1789 ==
After the Revolution Latapie no longer had a post, and offered his natural history cabinet and his library to the commune of Bordeaux in exchange for an annuity and a post as professor of botany. He founded the Musée du Jardin public in 1791. His important and precious herbarium was often cited by botanists in Paris and given in its entirety to his adoptive city after his death.

== Personal life ==
In 1792, he bought a shop to house his young wife, Louis Marie Menoire, when he was 52 and she was 25.
