= Considerations on the Causes of the Greatness of the Romans and their Decline =

18th-century book by Montesquieu

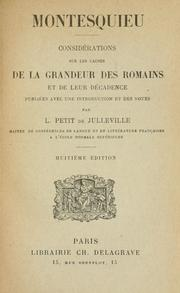
- Author: Montesquieu
- Language: French
- Genre: Historical essay
- Published: 1734
- Publication place: France
- Media type: Printed monograph
- Pages: 277

Considerations on the Causes of the Greatness of the Romans and their Decline (French: Considérations sur les causes de la grandeur des Romains et de leur décadence) is an 18th-century book written by French political philosopher Montesquieu. First published in 1734, it is widely considered by scholars to be among Montesquieu's best known works and was an inspiration to Edward Gibbon's more extensive The History of the Decline and Fall of the Roman Empire.

== Publication ==
In 1734, the book was first published anonymously as an octavo by Jacques Desbordes in Amsterdam. There are no surviving manuscripts prior to 1734, except for one preface which was ultimately excluded from the publication. This leaves uncertainty as to when exactly the work was written.

However, Montesquieu kept meticulous notes and corrections right after the publication, which were used in an edition revised by Montesquieu himself and published in France in 1748.

== Format ==
In its 1734 edition, a copy of which resides in the National Library of France, the book consists of a leatherbound cover including 277 pages organized into 23 chapters, plus 2 pages of errata.

== Content ==
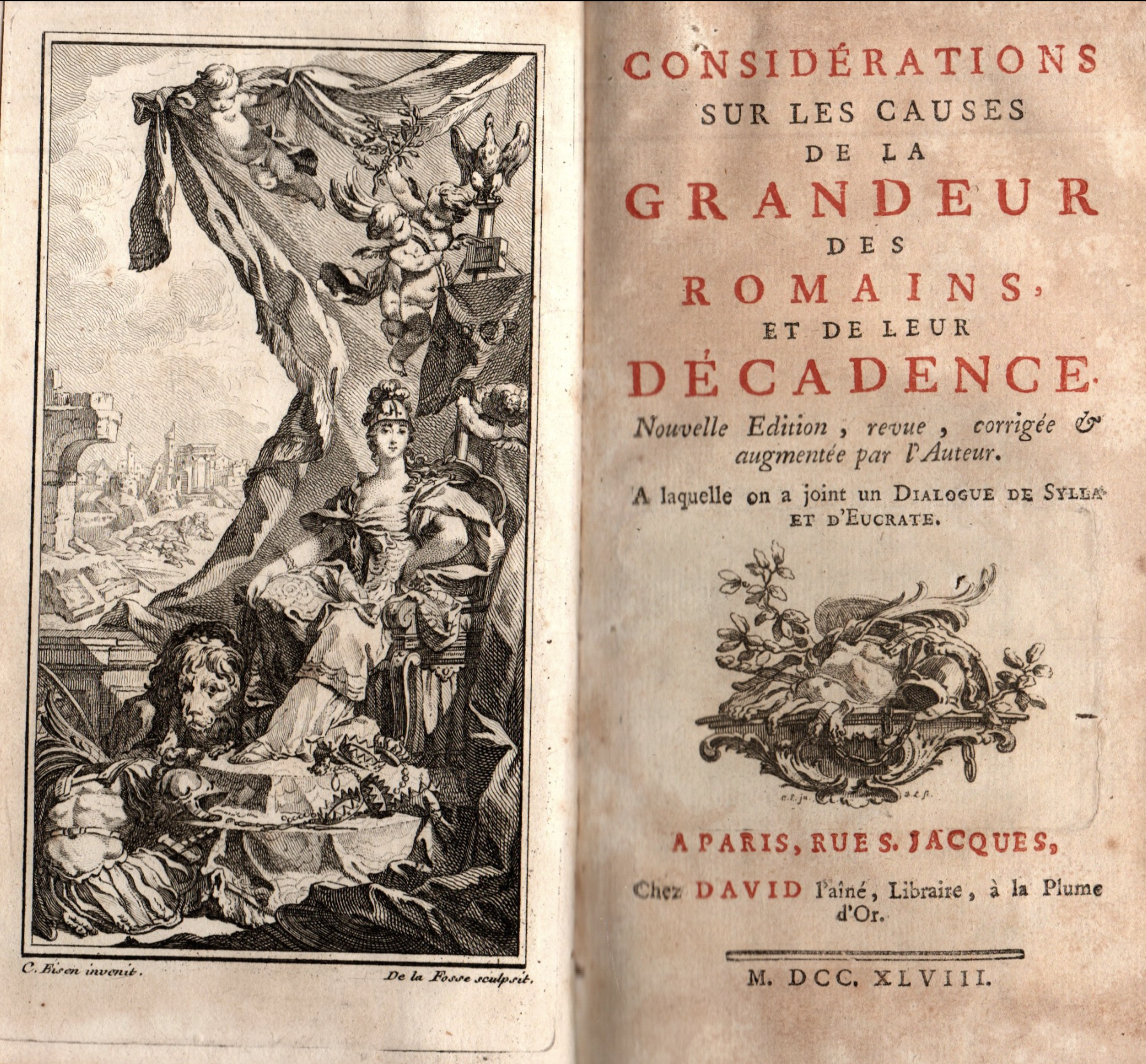
Frontispiece and title page of 1748 edition

Initially, Montesquieu only intended on writing a few pages on the topic. However, the size of his topic overwhelmed him, so he chose to expand the scope of his writing from the beginnings of the Roman Republic to the decay of the late Roman Empire. He begins in the year 753 BC, the traditional date for the founding of Rome, and continues until the Fall of Constantinople in AD 1453 to an invading army of the Ottoman Empire. Montesquieu extensively compares the Roman civilisation to other civilisations, usually its enemies (including Carthage, Greece, and Macedon), throughout the course of the book.

In Chapters I to X, Montesquieu postulates that the wealth, military might and expansionist policies, which were by most historical accounts a source of great strength for Rome, actually contributed to the weakening of the spirit of civic virtue of Roman citizens. After detailing the history of Rome's many wars, Montesquieu claimed, "The greatness of the state caused the greatness of personal fortunes. But since opulence consists in morals, not riches, the riches of the Romans, which continued to have limits, produced a luxury and profusion which did not."

In the remainder of the book, Montesquieu details a pattern of steady moral decline interrupted with several short periods of remission caused by the leadership of great emperors, such as Titus, Nerva, Trajan, Antoninus Pius, Marcus Aurelius and Julian as examples of this. Montesquieu states that the Sack of Rome and downfall of the Western Roman Empire irreparably destabilized the region. He also concludes that the rise of Christianity and the desire of the citizenry for the opulence of Rome's most prosperous period directly precipitated the fall of the Greek Empire (Eastern Empire). When the Ottoman Empire was pressing in on Byzantine territory, "people were more preoccupied with the Council of Florence than with the Turkish army."

== See also ==
- Decline of the Roman Empire
- The History of the Decline and Fall of the Roman Empire
