= Couternon =

- Commune
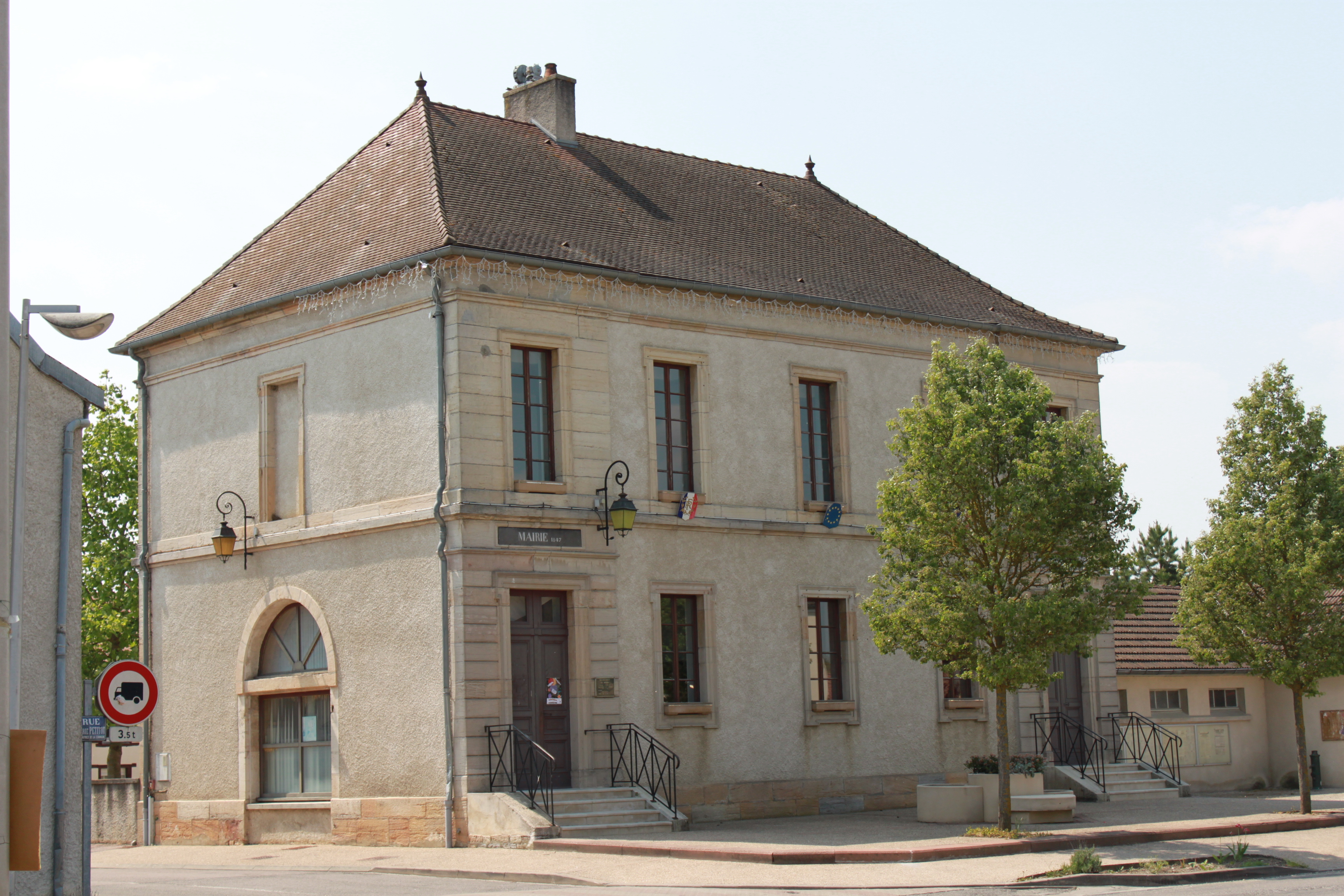
- Town hall

- Coat of arms
- Location of Couternon
- Location within France Location within Bourgogne-Franche-Comté
- Coordinates: 47°20′05″N 5°09′02″E
- Country: France
- Region: Bourgogne-Franche-Comté
- Department: Côte-d'Or
- Arrondissement: Dijon
- Canton: Saint-Apollinaire
- Intercommunality: Norge et Tille

Government
  - Mayor (2020–2026): Martine Demaure
- Area^{1}: 6.81 km^{2} (2.63 sq mi)
- Highest elevation: 229 m (751 ft)
- Lowest elevation: 211 m (692 ft)
- Population (2023): 1,883
  - Density: 277/km^{2} (716/sq mi)
- Time zone: UTC+01:00 (CET)
  - Summer (DST): UTC+02:00 (CEST)
- INSEE/Postal code: 21209 /21560
- ^{1} French Land Register data, which excludes lakes, ponds, glaciers > 1 km^{2} (0.386 sq mi or 247 acres) and river estuaries.

Couternon (French pronunciation: [kutɛʁnɔ̃]) is a commune in the Côte-d'Or department in eastern France.

== Population ==
Historical population
Year	Pop.	±% p.a.
1968	345	—
1975	590	+7.97%
1982	745	+3.39%
1990	1,116	+5.18%
1999	1,515	+3.45%
2007	1,622	+0.86%
2012	1,780	+1.88%
2017	1,889	+1.20%
2023	1,883	−0.05%
Source: INSEE

== Notable people ==
- Jocelyne Pérard (b. 1940), geographer; president, University of Burgundy, 1993–98

== See also ==
- Communes of the Côte-d'Or department
