= Jean-Baptiste de Secondat =

French naturalist, botanist, and agronomist

Jean-Baptiste de Secondat baron de La Brède (12 February 1716 – 17 June 1796) was an 18th-century French naturalist botanist, and agronomist. He was the eldest son of Charles de Secondat Montesquieu, Baron de La Brède (1689–1755) and Jeanne Catherine de Lartigue (1689–1770).

== Some publications ==
The standard author abbreviation Secondat is used to indicate this person as the author when citing a botanical name.

=== Books ===
- 1749: Considérations sur le commerce et la navigation de la Grande-Bretagne, by Joshua Gee, translated from English

== Honors ==
=== Eponymous ===
- (Fagaceae) Quercus secondatii Steud.
