= Catherine Hill (epidemiologist) =

French epidemiologist and biostatistician

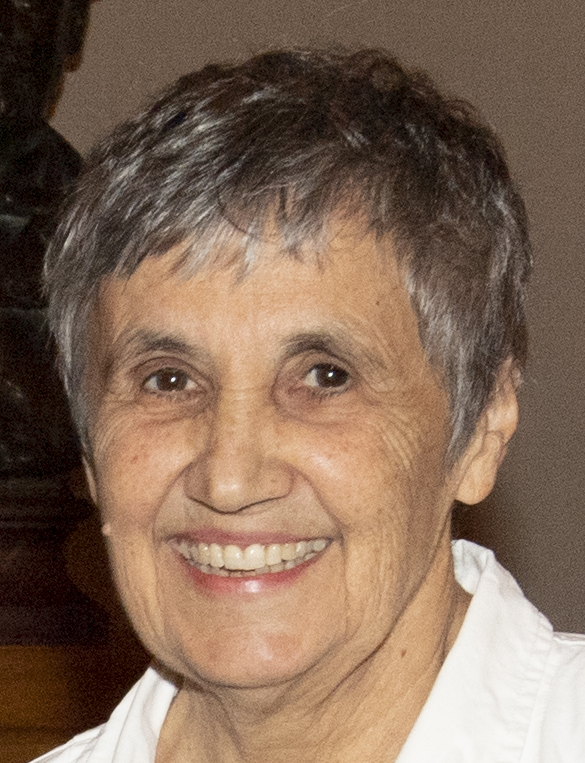
Photo Hill 019

Catherine Hill (born September 6, 1946) is a retired French epidemiologist and biostatistician who worked at the Institut Gustave Roussy.

== Biography ==
Hill was born Geneviève Catherine Oudin in the 14th arrondissement of Paris to François Oudin and Marie-Adélaïde Régnier. She is a graduate of lycée Marie Curie in Sceaux, Hauts-de-Seine before earning a master's degree in math from the University of Paris, then a diploma of advanced studies (DEA) in logic and set theory from Henri Poincaré University.

In 1979–80, she was a visiting scholar at Harvard University.

Se has two children with pediatrician Harold Hill, her first husband.

== Select publications ==
- Ribassin-Majed, Laureen; Pignon, Jean-Pierre; Michiels, Stefan; Blanchard, Pierre (2016). "Méta-analyses en réseau : Intérêt et limites en oncologie". Bulletin du Cancer. 103 (3): 289–293. doi:10.1016/j.bulcan.2016.01.003. PMID 26917469.
- Ribassin-Majed, L.; Hill, C. (2015). "Trends in tobacco-attributable mortality in France". European Journal of Public Health. 25 (5): 824–828. doi:10.1093/eurpub/ckv078. PMID 25958238.
- Cao, Bochen; Hill, Catherine; Bonaldi, Christophe; León, Maria E.; Menvielle, Gwenn; Arwidson, Pierre; Bray, Freddie; Soerjomataram, Isabelle (2018). "Cancers attributable to tobacco smoking in France in 2015". European Journal of Public Health. 28 (4): 707–712. doi:10.1093/eurpub/cky077. PMID 29741657.
