= Fabiola Terzi =

Italian-French scientist and physician

- Citizenship: Italian, French
- Education: University of Milan, University of Paris 7
- Known for: Studies of the physiopathology of chronic kidney disease
- Awards: Grand Prize of the Académie Nationale de Médecine, Prize of the French Kidney Foundation
- Scientific career
- Fields: Paediatrics

Fabiola Terzi is an Italian-French scientist and physician. She is known for her research on chronic kidney disease. Since January 2020, she serves as the director of the research Institut Necker-Enfants Malades (INEM) in Paris. In 2025, she was appointed Knight of the Legion of Honour.

== Life and career ==
Fabiola Terzi attended medical school at the University of Milan where she graduated with a medical degree (M.D.) in 1986. She then trained as a pediatrician in the team of Professor Fabio Sereni in Milan specializing in pediatric nephrology. In 1989 she moved to Paris where she continued her specialization in pediatric nephrology in the team of Professor Michael Broyer and started a Ph.D. project under the supervision of Professor Claire Kleinknecht (Université Paris Diderot, Paris) developing her interest for the molecular mechanisms of renal diseases. After her doctorate, she went on to train as a postdoc, first in the team of Professor Pascal Briand (Institut Cochin, Paris), then in the team of Professor Gérard Friedlander (Faculté de Médecine, Site Bichat, Paris).

With time she progressively focused on the physiopathology of chronic kidney disease (CKD). From 2003 on, she began to build up her own laboratory ("Mechanisms and Therapeutic Strategies of Chronic Kidney Disease"), which she has headed since then. Upon the founding of the Institute Necker-Enfants Malades (INEM) in 2014, a research center affiliated to the French National Institute of Health and Medical Research, the French National Center for Scientific Research and to the University of Paris, she became head of the "Growth and Signaling" department. Since January 2020, she serves as the director of INEM responsible for 21 research teams (as of May 2026). Besides, she is editor of the "Experimental Nephrology and Genetics" section of the journal Nephron since 2015.

== Scientific contribution ==
Fabiola Terzi's scientific work centers on the cellular events contributing either to the prevention or progression of chronic kidney disease (CKD) and on characterizing the pathways and genetic programs underlying these events. She developed distinct experimental models of CKD, above all a model of nephron reduction, leading her to the discovery of pathways and potential pharmacological targets driving CKD. In particular, her team revealed a detrimental role of the epidermal growth factor receptor (EGFR) pathway in the fate of CKD, the activation of which aggravates renal lesions after nephron reduction.

Beyond that, she has been involved in several translational studies that have succeeded in the identification of novel biomarkers (of the progression) of renal diseases in humans. These latter are protected by five patent filings (as of July 2022).

Along with other CKD experts, she is the co-initiator of TrainCKDis, a European training programme intended to train the next generation of CKD scientists, which is funded by the European Union's Horizon 2020 research and innovation programme.

== Awards and honors ==
For her scientific contributions to the field of nephrology she has been awarded the Grand Prize of the French National Academy of Medicine (French: Grand Prix de l'Académie Nationale de Médecine) in 2009 and the Prize of the French Kidney Foundation (French: Prix de la Fondation du Rein) in 2011. In 2025, Fabiola Terzi was appointed Knight of the Legion of Honour, France's highest order of merit.
