= Marie-Odile Soyer-Gobillard =

French biologist (born 1939)

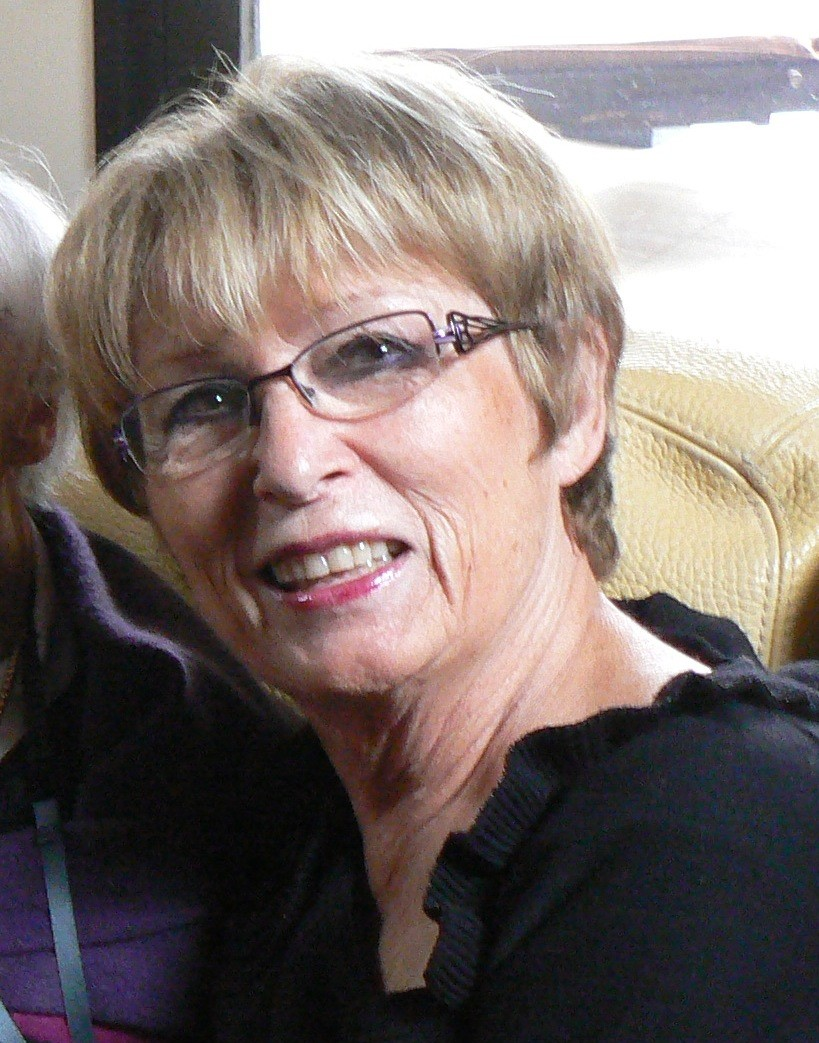
- Born: April 9, 1939 (age 87); Sézanne, Marne, France
- Education: Faculty of sciences of Sorbonne University, Pierre and Marie Curie University
- Awards: Paul Wintrebert Foundation Prize (1974), Trégouboff Prize of the National Academy of Sciences (1988), Emeritat of the French National Centre for Scientific Research (2000-2005), Knight of the Legion of Honour (2021)
- Scientific career
- Fields: Marine cell biology, protistology, endocrinology, ecotoxicology, CNRS Honorary Emeritus Director of research
- Doctoral advisor: Professor Pierre-Paul Grassé, Evolutionist (neo-Darwinian) and Protistologist.

Marie-Odile Soyer-Gobillard (born 9 April 1939) is a French biologist, Doctor of Science, Honorary Emeritus Director of Research at the French National Centre for Scientific Research (CNRS) and President of an association dedicated to scientific research.

At the Arago Laboratory, her scientific work, recognized worldwide, focused on the cellular and molecular study of protists, in particular dinoflagellates. She formed and led a cell and molecular biology team, which supported her scientific activity. She has progressively introduced the most advanced techniques for the study of marine cell biology.

Over the past ten years, she has become known to the general public for her studies on psychiatric disorders in children exposed in utero to synthetic hormones, in particular diethylstilbestrol (DES), as well as on their multigenerational effect. This work is carried out in close collaboration with the association Hhorages-France of which she is the President.

== Career ==
In September 1961, at 22, after obtaining a Graduate Degree (Diplôme d'études supérieures), she joined the CNRS at the Observatoire océanologique de Banyuls-sur-Mer (OOB), a marine laboratory, known as the "Laboratoire Arago", where she spent her entire career.

In 1974, she founded the Cell and Molecular Biology Department, dedicated to the study of the mechanisms that control the functioning of certain marine organisms used as models by researchers on, among other things, the structure of chromosomes, the proteins of the mitotic apparatus and the course of the cell-cycle.

From 1980 to 1989, she was an elected member of the Board of Directors of the Arago Laboratory. From 1987 to 1991, she was an appointed member of the National Committee of the CNRS (section 28, Biology of Organisms) of which she was vice-president. From 1975 until her retirement in 2000, she was in charge of a research group, of the Electron Microscopy Service as well as of the Cell and Molecular Biology Department until 1995

== Work ==
=== Scientific papers ===
To date, Marie-Odile Soyer-Gobillard has published more than 180 publications in international peer-reviewed scientific journals, particularly in cell and molecular biology, and has given more than 200 presentations at conferences.

=== Selected books ===
- Margulis L., M.O. Soyer-Gobillard & J. Corliss, Evolutionary protistology. The organism as cell. Rep. Origins of Life, 1984, 13 (3-4). D.Reidel Publishing Company, Dordrecht/Boston, 183 pp (ISBN 9789027717658).
- Soyer-Gobillard, M.O. & Schrevel, J, The Discoveries and Artistic Talents of Édouard Chatton and André Lwoff, Famous Biologists. (Bilingual version, French-English). Cambridge Scholars Publishing (CSP) Editor, June 2020. (283 pp., 123 Figs) (ISBN 978-1-5275-5066-7).
- Testimonial (in French): Une résilience ou les trois Marie-Odile, Nombre 7 Editions, 2021 (ISBN 9782381536606)
- Resilience: A scientist's campaign against synthetic hormones. Nombre 7 Editions, collection Hippocrate, 2022, 416 pp. ISBN 978-2-38351-211-0

=== Artwork ===
In October 1998, after the death of her son, she started working with clay in a workshop in Perpignan. In 2000, she became a sculptor and held her first exhibition in Banyuls-sur-Mer, the homeland of Aristide Maillol. In 2013, she declares "I had lived the ignoble, and I wanted to recreate beauty".

Her work has been exhibited on numerous occasions, notably in Paris, Perpignan, Barcelona and Sézanne. In September 2000, she received the 3rd international prize of Sculpture at the International Art Fair of Argèles-sur-Mer

== Awards and honors ==
- In 1974, Marie-Odile Soyer-Gobillard received the Paul Wintrebert Foundation Prize
- In 1988, she received the Trégouboff Prize of the National Academy of Sciences (quadrennial marine biology prize).
- From 2000 to 2005, she was Emeritus Research Director at the CNRS.
- From 2004 to 2009, she was a corresponding member of the National Museum of Natural History (MNHN) of Paris.
- On July 14, 2021, on the occasion of the Bastille Day, she was appointed Chevalier de la Légion d'Honneur, in recognition of her scientific and associative career.
