= Antoine Georges Roederer =

French engineer and scientist

Antoine G. Roederer
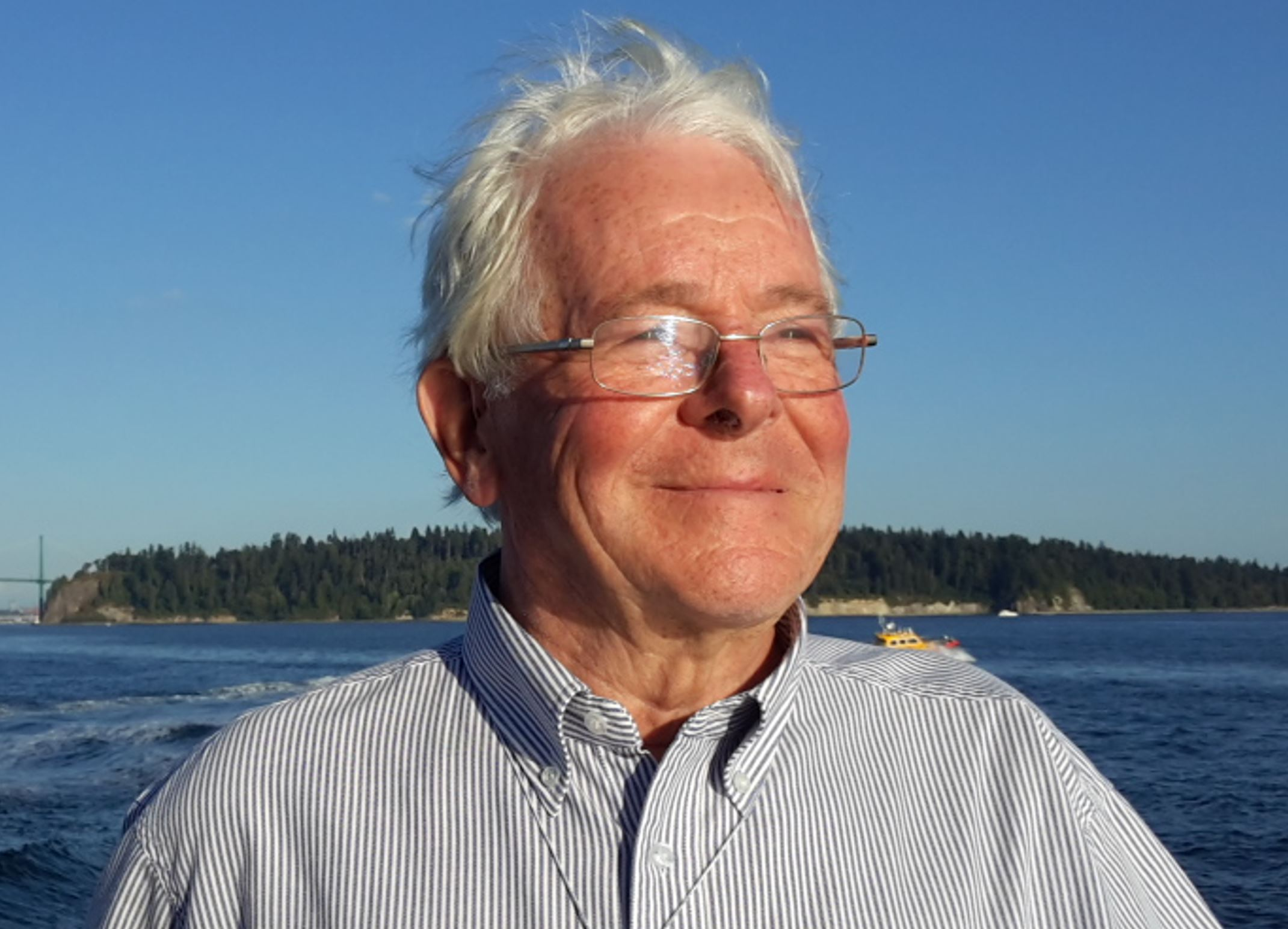
- Roederer in 2015
- Born: 1943 (age 82–83); Paris, France
- Occupation: European Space Agency Scientist
- Years active: 1968 - present
- Known for: Research on satellites & antenna

Antoine Georges Roederer (born in Paris, 1943) is a French engineer and scientist known for his significant contributions to antenna systems and satellite communications design. He is notably associated with the European Space Agency and Delft University of Technology.

== Early life and education ==
Roederer was born in Paris, France, in 1943. He earned a B.S.E.E. from Ecole Superieure d'Electricite, Paris, in 1964, an M.S.E.E. from the University of California, Berkeley, in 1965, and a Ph.D. in Electrical Engineering from the University of Paris VI in 1972.

== Professional career ==
From 1968 to 1973, he worked with Thomson-CSF as a Radar Antenna R&D Engineer. Roederer then worked at The European Space Research and Technology Centre, part of the European Space Agency (ESA, formerly ESRO) from 1973 until his retirement in 2008, playing a crucial role in developing advanced satellite communications technologies. Currently, he is a scientific advisor and a guest associate professor at Delft University of Technology (TU Delft).

Roederer's work has impacted the fields of satellite communications, telecommunications infrastructure, 5G technology, broadcasting, GPS, disaster management, and environmental monitoring. His contributions include innovative compact antenna designs for circularly polarised broadcasting and communications, analysis of mutual coupling and scattering in finite arrays, multibeam antenna systems and beamforming techniques, semi-active antennas, microwave hybrid couplers, thermal management in antennas and advancements in 5G technology. During his time at ESA, Roederer contributed to several missions, including Artemis, Herschel Space Observatory, Gaia, the Galileo Satellite Navigation System, as well as the INMARSAT satellite programmes. In 2000, Roederer initiated and chaired the Millennium Conference on Antennas and Propagation (AP 2000), Davos, which was the precursor of the large EUCAP conferences.

== Scientific contributions and patents ==
Roederer holds over 20 patents, including:

- Reflector Antenna Comprising a Plurality of Panels (Patent No. 6411255)
- Feed Device for a Multisource and Multibeam Antenna (Patent No. 5736963)
- Circular Polarization Antenna (Patent No. 5264861)
- Microwave Hybrid Coupler (Patent No. 5237294)
- Multibeam Antenna Feed Device (Patent No. 5115248)

== Selected publications ==
- "Concentric Ring Array Synthesis for Low Side Lobes," IEEE Access, 2021.
- "Orthogonal Versus Zero-Forced Beamforming in Multibeam Antenna Systems," IEEE Journal of Microwaves, 2021.
- "Multiple Beam Synthesis of Passively Cooled 5G Planar Arrays Using Convex Optimization," IEEE Transactions on Antennas and Propagation, 2020.
- "Synthesis of Optimal 5G Array Layouts with Wide-Angle Scanning and Zooming Ability," IEEE Antennas and Wireless Propagation Letters, 2020.
- "Effect of Element Number Reduction on Inter-User Interference and Chip Temperatures in Passively-Cooled Integrated Antenna Arrays for 5G," EuCAP, 2020.

== Awards and recognitions ==
Roederer has received several awards and recognitions by various organisations in his field. Below is a selection of rewards and recognitions.

- 1995 - Distinguished Lecturer for the IEEE Antennas and Propagation Society
- 1996 - IEEE life fellow for contributions in the field of arrays and multibeam reflector antennas.
- 2005 - TU Delft Doctorate Honoris Causa for his outstanding scientific contributions in electrical engineering, in particular in the field of antennas, ranging from fundamentals to antenna applications for Earth-based and space-based telecommunications and radar systems.
- 2013 - EurAAP award for outstanding contributions to the antenna innovative research and development and his leadership in AP-2000 Davos conference organisation paving the way for EuCAP.

== Personal life ==
Antoine Roederer has three children with his wife Judy. His hobbies include mountaineering, skiing, hiking, cycling and chess.
