= Alfred Legoyt =

- Born: 1812
- Died: 1885 (aged 72–73)
- Scientific career
- Fields: Statistics

Alfred Legoyt (1812–1885) was a French statistician who organised the census of France in 1856, 1861 and 1866. With his access to vital statistics Legoyt was the most important official statistician of France and was the official delegate to the International Statistical Congresses held in different European cities between 1853 and 1876.

== Early career ==
Legoyt started his career as a clerk in the Ministry of the Interior and went on to be the deputy chief of the ministry's Bureau of Statistics in 1839. In 1833 the Statistique Générale de la France was created as the division of statistics of the Ministry of Commerce. Legoyt replaced Alexandre Moreau De Jonnes as director of the Statistique Générale de la France in 1852. Unlike Moreau de Jonnès Legoyt placed more importance on the practical work of data collection rather than on classification and analysis.

== The 1856 Census ==
When Legoyt became director of SGF he took over the responsibility of organising the census from the bureau of statistics of the Ministry of the Interior and placed it under the stewardship of the SGF. As the Census Commissioner, of the forthcoming quinquennial census of 1856 Legoyt instructed his officials to use the households as the basis for the enumeration and to confine to the recording the occupation of the head of the family. It differed significantly from the 1851 Census in which the profession of all enumerated persons, including family dependents were recorded. In the words of Legoyt,

... include in each profession not only the head of the family, but also every person directly or indirectly supported by his profession, that is to say, his family, his workers, his various agents, and even his servants.

Legoyt held the position of director of SGF until the fall of the Second Empire in 1870.

He also served as the first permanent secretary of Société de Statistique de Paris from its creation in 1861 throughout the Second Empire.

He received an award from the Alliance Israélite Universelle for his book, De la vitalité de la race juive en Europe (1865).
