= Jocelyne Pérard =

French geographer, academic (*1940)

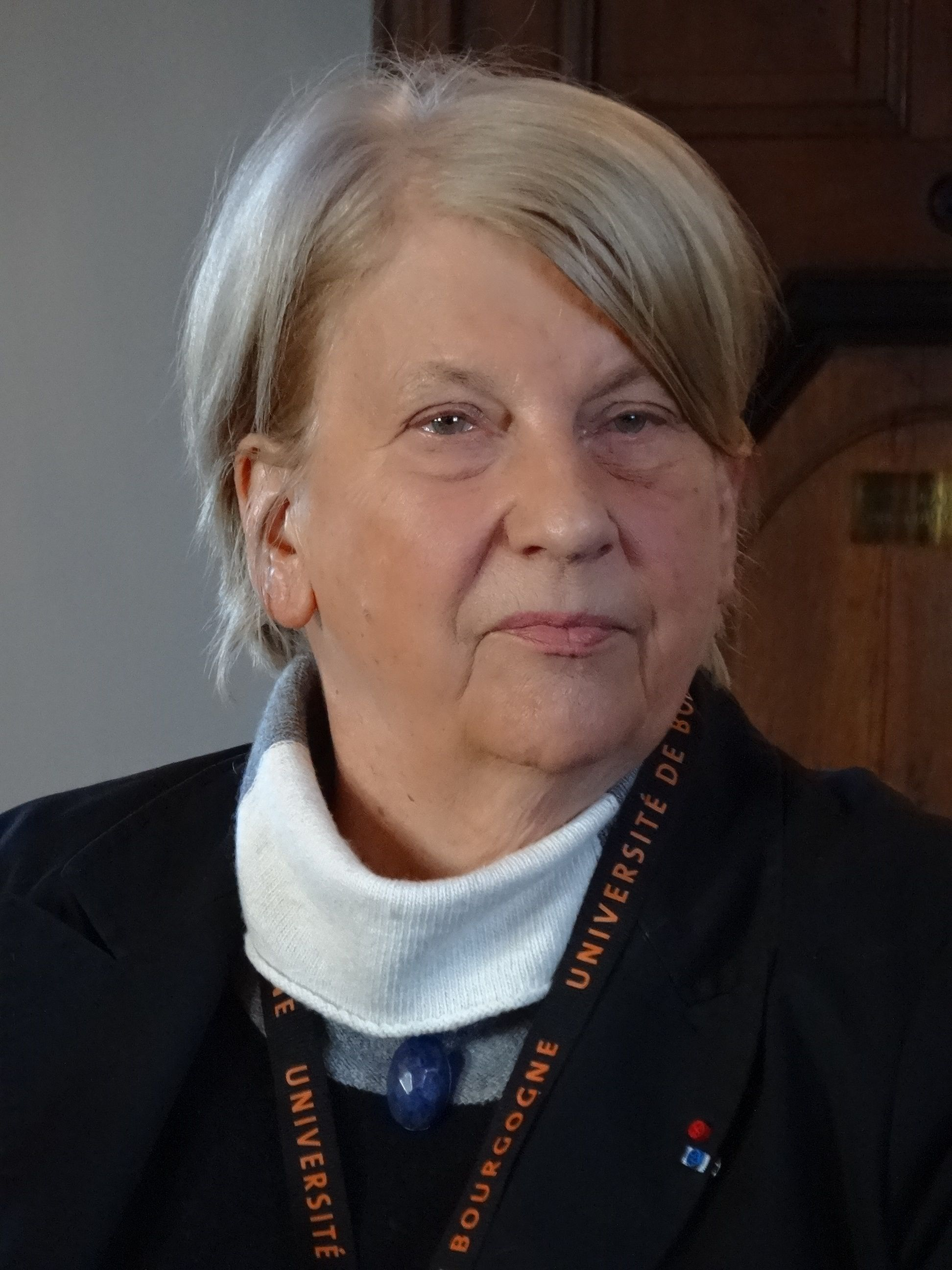
- Jocelyne Pérard en 2017.
- Born: 6 June 1940; Couternon
- Awards: Officer of the Legion of Honor (2009)
- Academic career
- Institutions: University of Burgundy Europe
- Position held: university president (1993–1998)

Jocelyne Pérard (née Tournier; born June 6, 1940) is a French geographer. Her work focuses on tropical climatology, before devoting herself to the link between wine and climate in the context of climate change. President of the University of Burgundy (Dijon) from 1993 to 1998, she has been politically involved in the cultural development of wine in Dijon. Her work and commitment have been rewarded with numerous distinctions.

== Biography ==
Jocelyne Tournier was born in Couternon, 1940. Her parents were of modest origin, her mother was a cleaning lady at the University of Burgundy and her grandparents were farmers, a milieu which she believes is the origin of her sensitivity to the land and to nature. Although she wanted to become an archaeologist, not having learned Greek, she turned to geography. She studied at the University of Burgundy where she was awarded the prize for the best geography student in 1962. In 1963, her graduate degree was entitled Commercialisation des produits laitiers dans la région dijonnaise (Commercialization of dairy products in the Dijon region). After receiving her Agrégée in geography, she left to teach high school in Pointe-à-Pitre, Guadeloupe, which led her to develop a passion for the tropical climate.

She obtained her doctorate in 1984, entitled Recherches sur les climats de l'archipel malais : les Philippines (Research on the climates of the Malay Archipelago: the Philippines) under the direction of climatologist Pierre Pagney. At the time, there were no climatological databases, which made it difficult for Perard to do her research in Manila and Cotonou. It was with her thesis director that she initiated the French National Centre for Scientific Research (CNRS) at the University of Burgundy, which was very active in France in her discipline, and which she directed for a time.

Pérard was elected president of the University of Burgundy from 1993 to 1998. At the time, she was one of the three women presidents of universities in France. Her term of office was marked by reforms in higher education, the Bayrou reform on examinations, and by changes in the policies of regional universities. At the end of her career, she was a professor of geography at this university. Pérard was named professor emeritus in 2015. She humorously mentioned in 2019 that wanting to be a winemaker, she became an academic, as the University of Burgundy owns a vineyard in Marsannay-la-Côte.

Approved in 2007, Pérard created and held the UNESCO Chair Culture et traditions du vin (Culture and traditions of wine) at the University of Burgundy. It was the fourteenth in France, but original at the international level by the uniqueness of its subject, wine being spread all over the globe. The chair studies the entire wine chain, from the vine to tasting, from a multidisciplinary perspective14. After losing its label in 2023, in 2024 the Chair, still directed by Jocelyne Pérard in collaboration with Marielle Adrian, became the UNESCO Chair "Cultures and Traditions of Wine" at the University of Burgundy.

== Awards and honours ==
- Honorary doctorate, Johannes-Gutenberg University of Mainz
- Medal of honor from the city of Couternon
- Prize of the International Organization of Vine and Wine for Wine and Gastronomy
- Commander, Confrérie des Chevaliers du Tastevin
- Commander, Ordre des Palmes académiques
- Commander, Ordre national du Mérite (2015)
- Officer, Legion of Honour (2009); Knight, Legion of Honour (1997)

== Selected works ==
=== Books ===
- Pérard, Jocelyne; Jacquet, Olivier (2019). Vin et gastronomie : regards croisés (in French). Éditions universitaires de Dijon. ISBN 978-2-36441-307-8. OCLC 1104227773.
- Perrot, Maryvonne; Pérard, Jocelyne (2003). L'homme et l'environnement : histoire des grandes peurs et géographie des catastrophes; Actes du colloque organisé à Dijon du 16 au 18 novembre 2000 (in French). Université de Bourgogne. ISBN 2-906645-43-5. OCLC 470415654.
- Pérard, Jocelyne; Escourrou, Pierre (1 January 1988). Climats et climatologie : Volume d'hommage offert au Professeur Pierre Pagney (in French). Centre de recherches de climatologie. ISBN 978-2950276902.
