= Charles Madic =

French scientist

- Born: 8 August 1942; Coray, Finistère, France
- Died: 1 March 2008 (aged 65)
- Education: Université Pierre-et-Marie-Curie
- Known for: Qualitative chemical methods for treating highly radioactive material
- Scientific career
- Fields: Chemistry
- Institutions: Oak Ridge National Laboratory
- Academic advisors: Bernard Trémillon

Charles Madic (August 8, 1942 – March 1, 2008) was a French scientist working on the reprocessing of radioactive material.

== Biography ==
He was born August 8, 1942, in Coray, Finistère, France, to Henri Madic, customs officer, and Isabelle Madic born le Clech, housewife, the third child in a family of four living children. His family moved to Vitry-sur-Seine, near Paris, in 1951. He completed his secondary education by obtaining a diploma in chemistry at Lycée d'Arsonval of Saint-Maur-des-Fosses. He then went to university in 1959 to prepare for a BA in Chemistry. He did not join the contingent in Algeria, having obtained a postponement to complete his studies.

He accomplished his military service in Tunisia from 1966 to 1968, after completing his master's thesis. He taught physics and chemistry at the teachers training institute in Tunis. On his return, he completed a Ph.D. thesis at Université Pierre-et-Marie-Curie under the direction of Professor Bernard Trémillon, then an extended or "state doctorate" in partnership with the Commissariat à l'Énergie Atomique (CEA). He then became the director of research. He spent two years in the U.S. at the nuclear research center of Oak Ridge in the 1980s with his wife and two daughters.

== Scientific and educational contributions ==
Charles Madic is credited with some of the major advances over three decades in the qualitative chemical methods for treating highly radioactive material. He was regularly consulted by scientists across the world on issues pertaining to his field of expertise. He led a European project on nuclear toxicology and a major research partnership with Russia.

His lectures took him to many countries. He established close ties and friendships with many Russian and Japanese scientists.

He divided his time between the site of Saclay / Gif sur Yvette and that of Marcoule, his own research, his activities as a professor at the National Institute of Nuclear Science and Technology at the Ecole Centrale, his supervision of Ph.D. students and the lectures he gave in the whole world. He utilized opportunities to share his knowledge and passion for science with younger generations, each time seeking to make the scientific concepts he developed accessible to as many people as possible.

In 2005, he received the grand prize of the Academy of Sciences Ivan Peychès for his work on the physics and chemistry of actinides that led to major applications including the reprocessing of nuclear fuel and management of long-lived radioactive waste.

== Death ==
He died on 1 March 2008 in his sixty-sixth year, of Lou Gehrig's disease. A few months before, despite his difficult elocution due to his illness, he gave an important conference to the scientific community.

The epitaph published in the journal Le Monde by the CEA said that "Charles Madic was a great scientist who influenced a whole generation of researchers by providing them with a passion for science".

== Online scientific publications ==
- Overview of the Hydrometallurgical and Pyro-metallurgical processes studied worldwide for the partitioning of High Active Nuclear Wastes
- Madic, Charles; Lecomte, Michaël; Baron, Pascal; Boullis, Bernard (2002). "Separation of long-lived radionuclides from high active nuclear waste". Comptes Rendus Physique. 3 (7–8): 797–811. doi:10.1016/s1631-0705(02)01370-1.
- Le comportement imprévu du plutonium
- Les réacteurs nucléaires à caloporteur gaz
- Newpart: A European Research Programme for Minor Actinide Partitioning
- Plutonium Chemistry: Toward the End of PuO2's Supremacy?
