= André Niederlender =

French archaeologist (1890–1959)

- Born: 15 October 1890; Paris
- Died: 18 July 1959 (aged 68)
- Known for: Excavation of the Roucadour Cave
- Scientific career
- Fields: Archaeology, prehistory
- Institutions: Many sites in Lot

André Niederlender (15 October 1890 – 18 July 1959) was a French archaeologist and prehistorian, who explored prehistorical sites in Lot, France.

== Biography ==
Niederlender's father was originally from Wiesviller, Moselle, France, and his mother was from Rocamadour; they married in Paris (many Niederlenders came to Paris during the 19th century, all from Moselle, before and after the Franco-Prussian War). After marrying, they moved to Quercy, France. After many trips to Tonkin, Vietnam, Niederlender's father became the owner of the station hotel in Rocamadour.

André Niederlender was born 15 October 1890 in the 6th arrondissement of Paris. He grew up in Rocamadour near the railway station, and came into contact with many travellers. His father hosted and befriended Édouard-Alfred Martel, who studied the Causses de Gramat. Martel befriended Niederlender, sparking Niederlender's interest in the natural sciences, and brought Niederlender with him on trips to the Causses.

In 1906, Niederlender began studying prehistory under Armand Viré. He later became the owner of the station in Rocamadour and met many prehistorians such as Henri Breuil.

To Niederlender's great disappointment, many sites and dolmens had already been excavated or looted. While excavating sites that remained, he applied rigorous methods, because excavation ultimately destroyed the deposits. He described all of his research, and in 1943, gave any material he had found to the prehistory museum in Cabrerets.

From 1909 to 1913, he excavated the entrance to the Linars cave in the Alzou valley with Amédée Lemozi. With Raymond Lacam, he studied

- Mas Viel, in Saint-Simon, Lot
- The Pagès shelter, by the Labeyre bridge in Rocamadour
- The Roucadour sinkhole in Thémines
- The Cuzoul de Gramat, where he found a skeleton nicknamed "the man of Gramat".

In 1920, he studied the Rocamadour Cave of Wonders with Amédée Lemozi.

In 1925, with Édouard-Alfred Martel, he began excavating the Roucadour Cave. He worked with many prehistorians (Bergougnoux, Lacam, Bernard, Jarige, Morin) and sent several notes to Jean Arnal, who published them.

He was mayor of Rocamadour from 1929 to 1943.

Niederlender died 18 July 1959.

== Bibliography ==
- Armand Viré, Fouilles de Mr André Niederlender dans les dolmens et tumulus de la gare de Rocamadour, Monnoyer, 1910
- Armand Viré, "L'outillage de la sépulture de l'abri Murat à Rocamadour", Bulletin de la Société Préhistorique de France, 1929
- Archéologie et Archéologue - Canton de Gramat, Association Racines, éditions du Ver Luisant, p. 48-56
