= Montesquieu =

French jurist, historian, and political philosopher (1689–1755)

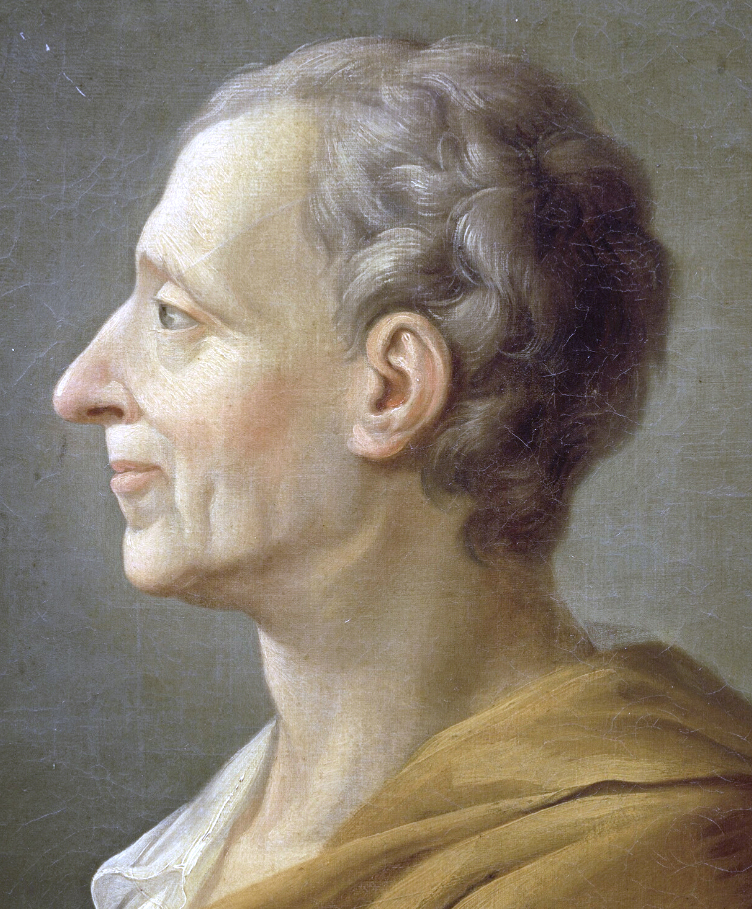
- Portrait by an anonymous artist, c. 1753–1794
- Born: 18 January 1689; Château de la Brède, La Brède, Aquitaine, France
- Died: 10 February 1755 (aged 66); Paris, France
- Spouse: Jeanne de Lartigue (m. 1715)
- Children: 3

Philosophical work
- Era: 18th-century philosophy
- Region: Western philosophy
- School: Enlightenment; Classical liberalism
- Main interests: Political philosophy
- Notable ideas: Separation of state powers: executive, legislative, judicial; classification of systems of government based on their principles

Charles Louis de Secondat, baron de La Brède et de Montesquieu (Note: US: /ˈmɒntəskjuː/, UK: /ˌmɒntɛˈskjɜː/; French: [ʃaʁl lwi də səɡɔ̃da baʁɔ̃ də la bʁɛd e də mɔ̃tɛskjø].) (18 January 1689 – 10 February 1755), generally referred to as simply Montesquieu, was a French jurist, historian, and political philosopher.

He is the principal source of the theory of separation of powers, which is implemented in many constitutions throughout the world. He is also known for propagating the term despotism in the modern political lexicon.

Montesquieu's anonymously published The Spirit of Law (De l'esprit des lois, 1748), first translated into English by Thomas Nugent in a 1750 edition, was received well in both Great Britain and the American colonies, where it influenced the Founding Fathers of the United States in drafting the U.S. Constitution.

== Biography ==
=== Early life and education ===
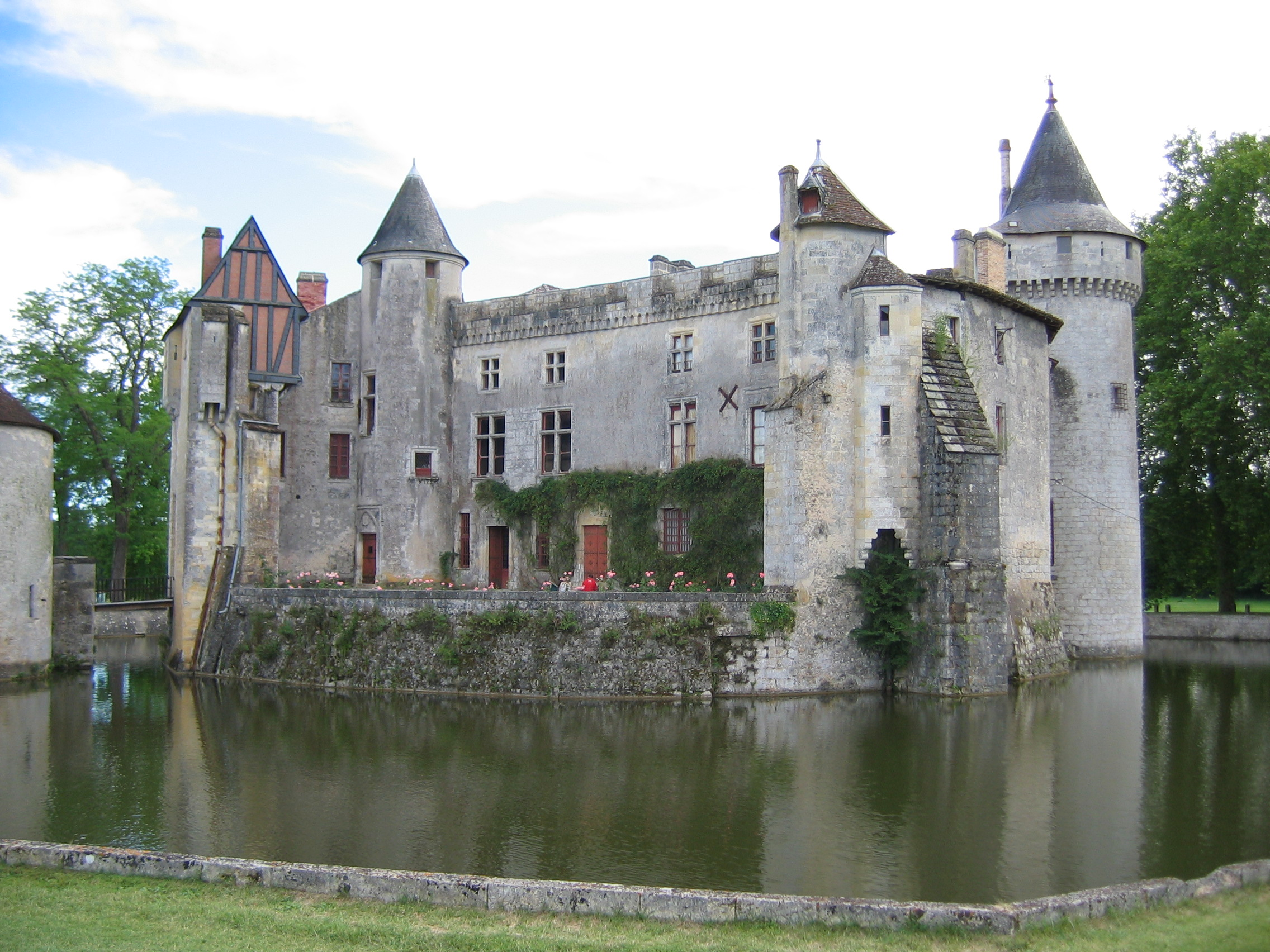
Château de la Brède, Montesquieu's birthplace

Montesquieu was born at the Château de la Brède in southwest France, 25 kilometres (16 mi) south of Bordeaux. His father, Jacques de Secondat (1654–1713), was a soldier with a long noble ancestry, including descent from Richard de la Pole, Yorkist claimant to the English crown. His mother, Marie Françoise de Pesnel (1665–1696), who died when Charles was seven, was an heiress who brought the title of Barony of La Brède to the Secondat family.

His family was of Huguenot origin. After the death of his mother he was sent to the Catholic College of Juilly, a prominent school for the children of French nobility, where he remained from 1700 to 1711. His father died in 1713, and he became a ward of his uncle, the Baron de Montesquieu. In 1714, he became a counselor of the Bordeaux Parlement. He showed a preference for Protestantism.

In 1715 he married the Protestant Jeanne de Lartigue, with whom he eventually had three children. The Baron died in 1716, leaving him his fortune as well as his title, and the office of président à mortier in the Bordeaux Parlement, a post that he held for twelve years.

Montesquieu's early life was a time of significant governmental change. England had declared itself a constitutional monarchy in the wake of its Glorious Revolution (1688–1689), and joined with Scotland in the Union of 1707 to form the Kingdom of Great Britain. In France, the long-reigning Louis XIV died in 1715, and was succeeded by the five-year-old Louis XV. These national transformations had a great impact on Montesquieu, and he referred to them repeatedly in his work.

=== Career ===
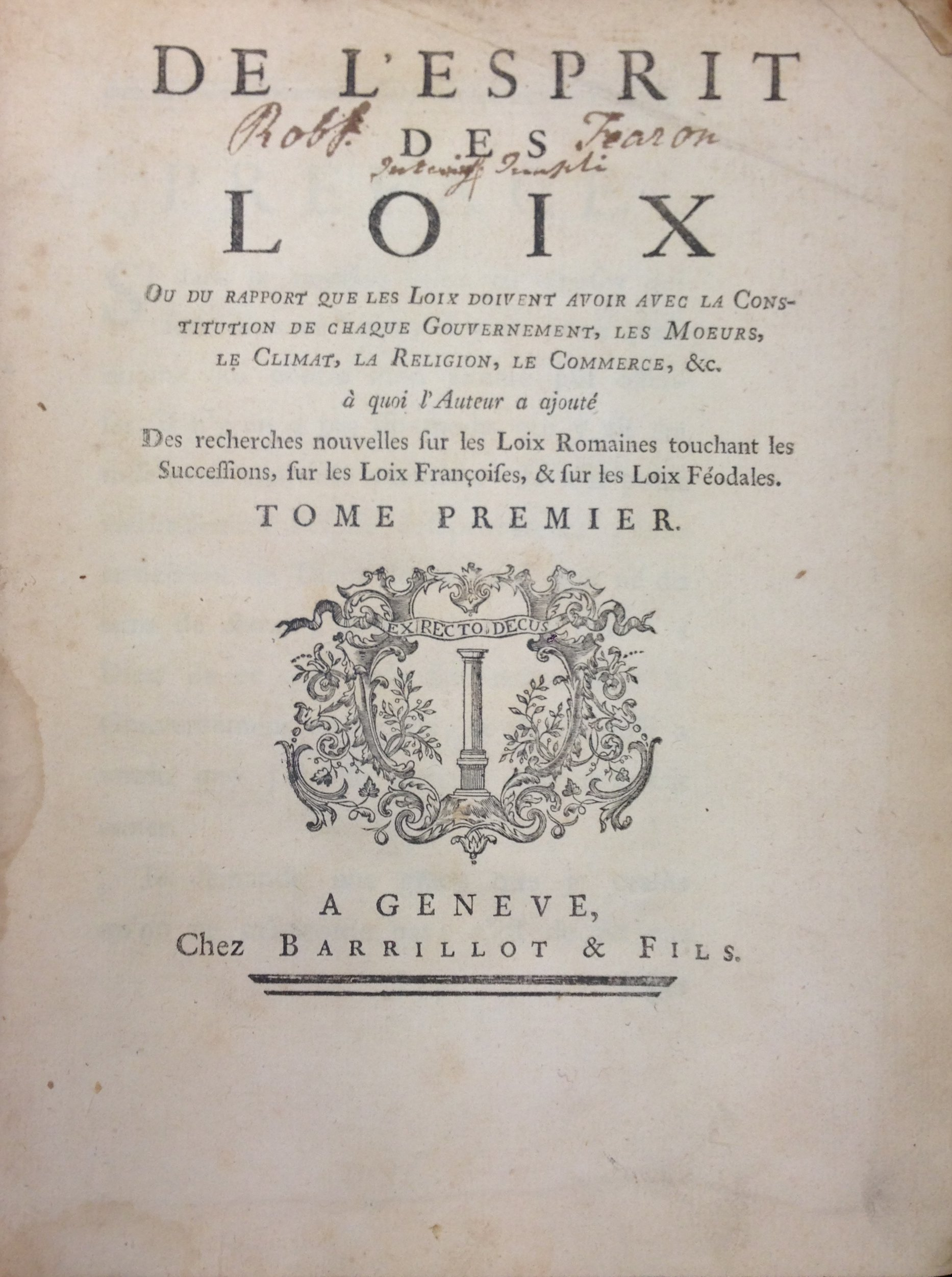
Montesquieu's 1748 De l'Esprit des loix

Montesquieu eventually withdrew from the practice of law to devote himself to study and writing. He achieved literary success with the publication of his 1721 Persian Letters (French: Lettres persanes), a satire representing society as seen through the eyes of two Persian visitors to Paris, cleverly criticizing absurdities of contemporary French society. The work was an instant classic and accordingly was immediately pirated.

In 1722, he went to Paris and entered social circles with the help of friends including the Duke of Berwick whom he had known when Berwick was military governor at Bordeaux. He also acquainted himself with the English politician Viscount Bolingbroke, some of whose political views were later reflected in Montesquieu's analysis of the English constitution. In 1726 he sold his office, bored with the parlement and turning more toward Paris. In time, despite some impediments he was elected to the Académie Française in January 1728.

In April 1728, with Berwick's nephew Lord Waldegrave as his traveling companion, Montesquieu embarked on a grand tour of Europe, during which he kept a journal. His travels included Austria, Slovakia, Hungary, a brief visit to Germany and a year in Italy. He went to England at the end of October 1729, in the company of Lord Chesterfield, where he was initiated into Freemasonry at the Horn Tavern Lodge in Westminster. He remained in England until the spring of 1731, when he returned to La Brède. Outwardly he seemed to be settling down as a squire: he altered his park in the English fashion, made inquiries into his own genealogy, and asserted his seignorial rights. But he was continuously at work in his study, a fertile ground for ideas containing a 3000 volume historic book collection. These sources, alongside his reflections on geography, laws and customs that were inspired and influenced by his travels, became the primary sources for his major works on political philosophy at this time like his magnum opus Des l'esprit des lois.

In 1734, he published Considerations on the Causes of the Greatness of the Romans and their Decline, among his three best known books. In 1748, he published The Spirit of Law, quickly translated into English. It quickly rose to influence political thought profoundly in Europe and America. In France, the book met with an enthusiastic reception by many, but was denounced by the Sorbonne and, in 1751, by the Catholic Church (Index of Prohibited Books). It received the highest praise from much of the rest of Europe, especially Britain.

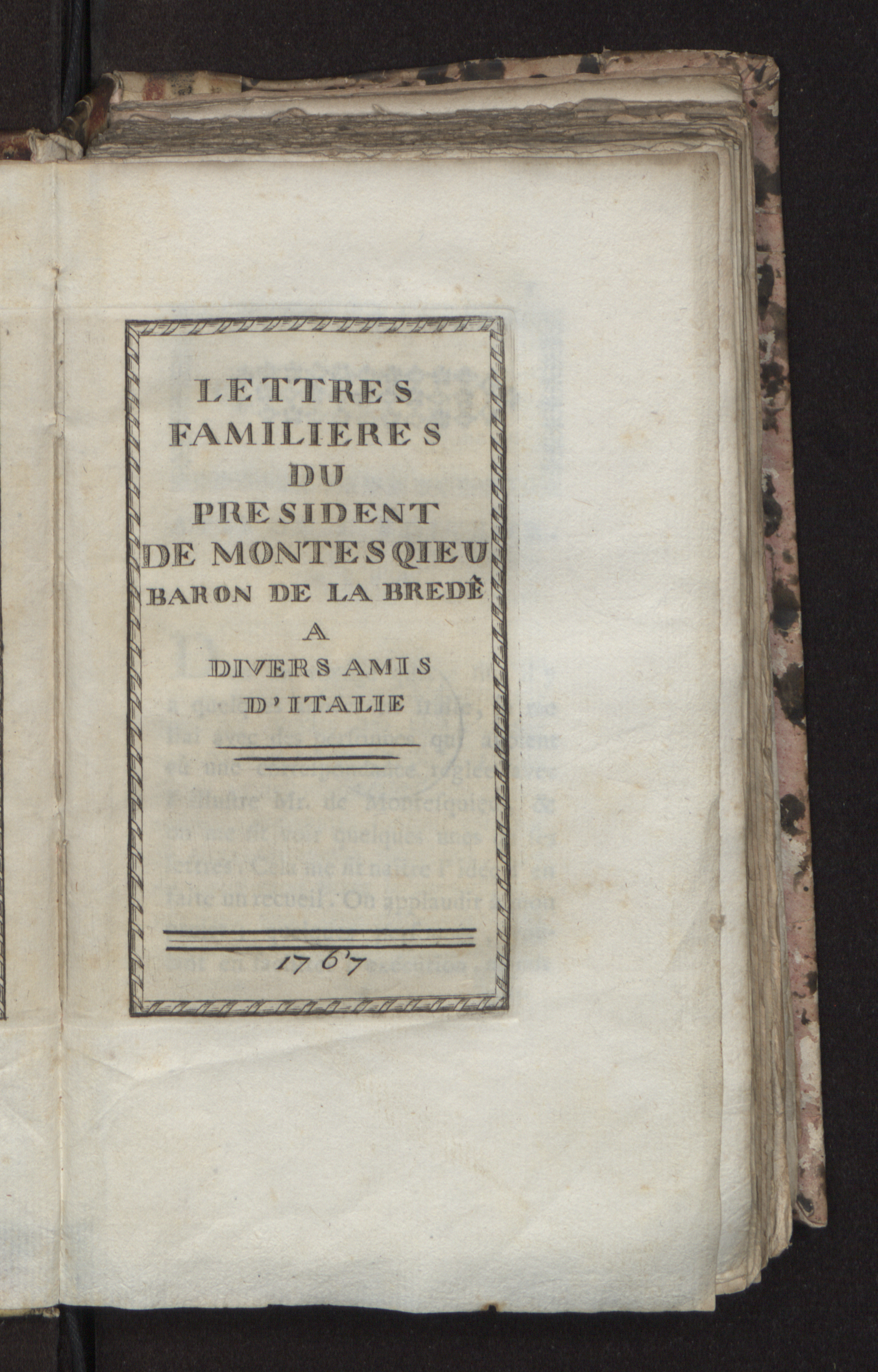
Lettres familières à divers amis d'Italie, 1767

=== Later life and death ===
Montesquieu was troubled by a cataract and feared going blind. At the end of 1754 he visited Paris and was soon taken ill. He died from a fever on 10 February 1755. He was buried in the Église Saint-Sulpice, Paris.

== Philosophy ==
=== Philosophy of history ===
Montesquieu's philosophy of history minimized the role of individual persons and events. He expounded the view in Considerations on the Causes of the Greatness of the Romans and their Decline, that each historical event was driven by a principal movement:

It is not chance that rules the world. Ask the Romans, who had a continuous sequence of successes when they were guided by a certain plan, and an uninterrupted sequence of reverses when they followed another. There are general causes, moral and physical, which act in every monarchy, elevating it, maintaining it, or hurling it to the ground. All accidents are controlled by these causes. And if the chance of one battle—that is, a particular cause—has brought a state to ruin, some general cause made it necessary for that state to perish from a single battle. In a word, the main trend draws with it all particular accidents.

In discussing the transition from the Republic to the Empire, he suggested that if Caesar and Pompey had not worked to usurp the government of the Republic, other men would have risen in their place. The cause was not the ambition of Caesar or Pompey, but the ambition of man.

=== Political philosophy ===
Montesquieu is credited as being among the progenitors, who include Herodotus and Tacitus, of anthropology—as being among the first to extend comparative methods of classification to the political forms in human societies. Indeed, the French political anthropologist Georges Balandier considered Montesquieu to be "the initiator of a scientific enterprise that for a time performed the role of cultural and social anthropology". According to social anthropologist D. F. Pocock, Montesquieu's The Spirit of Law was "the first consistent attempt to survey the varieties of human society, to classify and compare them and, within society, to study the inter-functioning of institutions." "Émile Durkheim," notes David W. Carrithers, "even went so far as to suggest that it was precisely this realization of the interrelatedness of social phenomena that brought social science into being."

Montesquieu's political anthropology gave rise to his influential view that forms of government are supported by governing principles: virtue for republics, honor for monarchies, and fear for despotisms. American founders studied Montesquieu's views on how the English achieved liberty by separating executive, legislative, and judicial powers, and when Catherine the Great wrote her Nakaz (Instruction) for the Legislative Assembly she had created to clarify the existing Russian law code, she avowed borrowing heavily from Montesquieu's Spirit of Law, although she discarded or altered portions that did not support Russia's absolutist bureaucratic monarchy.

Montesquieu's most influential work divided French society into three classes (or trias politica, a term he coined): the monarchy, the aristocracy, and the commons. Montesquieu saw two types of governmental power existing: the sovereign and the administrative. The administrative powers were the executive, the legislative, and the judicial. These should be separate from and dependent upon each other so that the influence of any one power would not be able to exceed that of the other two, either singly or in combination. This was a radical idea because it does not follow the three Estates structure of the French Monarchy: the clergy, the aristocracy, and the people at large represented by the Estates-General, thereby erasing the last vestige of a feudalistic structure.

==== The Spirit of Law ====
The theory of the separation of powers largely derives from The Spirit of Law:

In every state there are three kinds of power: the legislative authority, the executive authority for things that stem from the law of nations, and the executive authority for those that stem from civil law.

By virtue of the first, the prince or magistrate enacts temporary or perpetual laws, and amends or abrogates those that have been already enacted. By the second, he makes peace or war, sends or receives embassies, establishes the public security, and provides against invasions. By the third, he punishes criminals, or determines the disputes that arise between individuals. The latter we shall call the judiciary power, and the other, simply, the executive power of the state.

— Montesquieu, The Spirit of Law, XI, 6.

Montesquieu argues that each power should only exercise its own functions; he is quite explicit here:

When in the same person or in the same body of magistracy the legislative authority is combined with the executive authority, there is no freedom, because one can fear lest the same monarch or the same senate make tyrannical laws in order to carry them out tyrannically.

Again there is no freedom if the authority to judge is not separated from the legislative and executive authorities. If it were combined with the legislative authority, power over the life and liberty of the citizens would be arbitrary, for the judge would be the legislator. If it were combined with the executive authority, the judge could have the strength of an oppressor. All would be lost if the same man or the same body of principals, or of nobles, or of the people, exercised these three powers: that of making laws, that of executing public resolutions, and that of judging crimes or disputes between individuals.

— Montesquieu, The Spirit of Law, XI, 6.

If the legislative branch appoints the executive and judicial powers, as Montesquieu indicated, there will be no separation or division of its powers, since the power to appoint carries with it the power to revoke.

The executive authority must be in the hands of a monarch, for this part of the government, which almost always requires immediate action, is better administrated by one than by several, whereas that which depends on the legislative authority is often better organized by several than by one person alone.

If there were no monarch, and the executive authority were entrusted to a certain number of persons chosen from the legislative body, that would be the end of freedom, because the two authorities would be combined, the same persons sometimes having, and always in a position to have, a role in both.

— Montesquieu, The Spirit of Law, XI, 6.

Montesquieu identifies three main forms of government, each supported by a social "principle": monarchies (free governments headed by a hereditary figure, e.g. king, queen, emperor), which rely on the principle of honor; republics (free governments headed by popularly elected leaders), which rely on the principle of virtue; and despotisms (unfree), headed by despots which rely on fear. The free governments are dependent on constitutional arrangements that establish checks and balances. Montesquieu devotes one chapter of The Spirit of Law to a discussion of how England's constitution sustained liberty (XI, 6), and another to the realities of English politics (XIX, 27). As for France, the intermediate powers (including the nobility) the nobility and the parlements had been weakened by Louis XIV, and welcomed the strengthening of parlementary power in 1715.

Montesquieu advocated reform of slavery in The Spirit of Law, specifically arguing that slavery was inherently wrong because all humans are born equal, but that it could perhaps be justified within the context of climates with intense heat, wherein laborers would feel less inclined to work voluntarily. As part of his advocacy he presented a satirical hypothetical list of arguments for slavery. In the hypothetical list, ironically listed pro-slavery arguments without further comment, including an argument stating that sugar would become too expensive without the free labor of slaves.

While addressing French readers of his General Theory, John Maynard Keynes described Montesquieu as "the real French equivalent of Adam Smith, the greatest of your economists, head and shoulders above the physiocrats in penetration, clear-headedness and good sense (which are the qualities an economist should have)."

=== Climate theory and environmental determinism ===
A central idea to Montesquieu's anthropological thinking, outlined in The Spirit of Law and hinted at in Persian Letters, is his climate theory and environmental determinism, a theory also promoted by the French naturalist Georges-Louis Leclerc, Comte de Buffon.

Montesquieu proposed that climate and geography significantly influence both the character of individuals and the formation of laws and political institutions. While he acknowledged environmental effects, he did not regard them as absolute determinants: for him, laws and customs could counterbalance or harness these influences.

He argued that cold climates tighten the body’s fibers, enhancing strength and vigor; inhabitants of such climates thus tend to be courageous, resilient, and phlegmatic. In contrast, hot climates relax the body, fostering sensitivity, emotional volatility, and indecisiveness. Temperate climates, like that of France, were considered optimal, producing balanced temperament and stable institutions.

Montesquieu further linked environmental factors to forms of governance and social character. Fertile, flat terrain, he claimed, made regions easier to conquer and led to monarchy or despotism; in contrast, harsh or barren lands fostered industriousness, self-reliance, and the development of republican virtues.

Though Montesquieu received much attention, similar ideas existed earlier in ancient authors such as Hippocrates (On Airs, Waters, Places), The Histories of Herodotus, and Tacitus's Germania (one of Montesquieu's favorite authors). It is evident that a direct influence on Montesquieu was from François-Ignace d'Espiard de La Borde's (1707–1777) Essai sur le génie et le caractère des nations published in Brussels in 1743, which was republished in 1752 under the title Esprit des nations expressing the same climate theory and environmental determinism ideas. Montesquieu, far from the first to have these ideas, introduced them to a broad public during his time in De l'esprit des lois (The Spirit of the Laws).

From a sociological perspective, Louis Althusser, in his analysis of Montesquieu's revolution in method, alluded to the seminal character of anthropology's inclusion of material factors, such as climate, in the explanation of social dynamics and political forms.

== Legacy ==
Montesquieu was highly regarded in the British colonies in North America as a champion of liberty. According to a survey of late eighteenth-century works by political scientist Donald Lutz, Montesquieu was the most frequently quoted authority on government and politics in colonial pre-revolutionary British America, cited more by the American founders than any source except for the Bible. Following the American Revolution, his work remained a powerful influence on many of the American founders, most notably James Madison of Virginia, the "Father of the Constitution", who described Montesquieu as "the oracle who is always consulted and cited." Montesquieu's philosophy that "government should be set up so that no man need be afraid of another" reminded Madison and others that a free and stable foundation for their new national government required a clearly defined and balanced separation of powers.

=== Memorialization ===
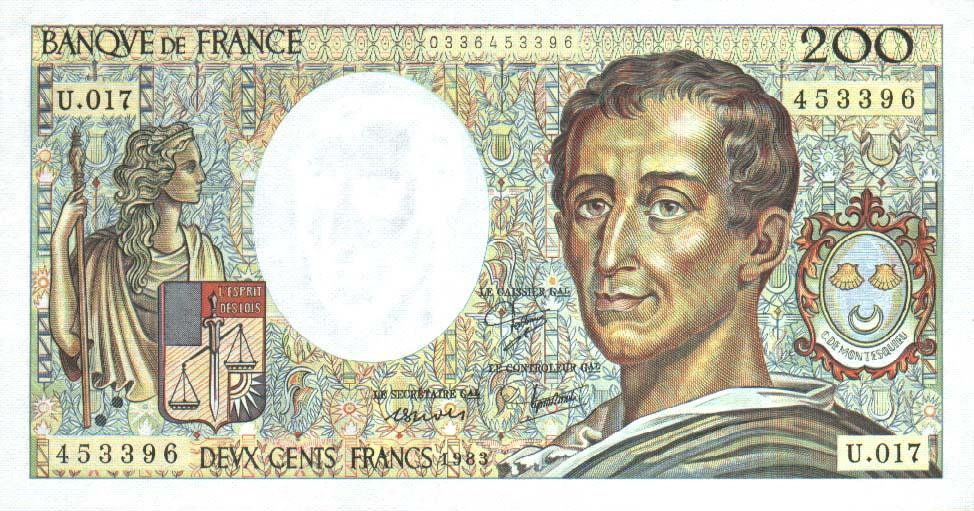
Montesquieu on the 200 French franc note

Between 1981 and 1994, a depiction of Montesquieu appeared on the 200 French franc note.

Since 1989, the annual Montesquieu prize has been awarded by the French Association of Historians of Political Ideas for the best French-language thesis on the history of political thought.

On Europe Day 2007, the Montesquieu Institute opened in The Hague, the Netherlands, with a mission to advance research and education on the parliamentary history and political culture of the European Union and its member states.

The Montesquieu tower in Luxembourg was completed in 2008 as an addition to the headquarters of the Court of Justice of the European Union. The building houses many of the institution's translation services. Until 2019, it stood, with its sister tower, Comenius, as the tallest building in the country.

== Works ==
- Memoirs and discourses at the Academy of Bordeaux (1718–1721): including discourses on echoes, on the renal glands, on weight of bodies, on transparency of bodies and on natural history, collected with introductions and critical apparatus in volumes 8 and 9 of Œuvres complètes, Oxford and Naples, 2003–2006.
- Spicilège (Gleanings, 1715 onward)
- Lettres persanes (Persian Letters, 1721)
- Le Temple de Gnide (The Temple of Gnidos, a prose poem; 1725)
- Histoire véritable (True History, an "Oriental" tale; c. 1723–c. 1738)
- Considérations sur les causes de la grandeur des Romains et de leur décadence (Considerations on the Causes of the Greatness of the Romans and their Decline, 1734) at Gallica
- Arsace et Isménie (Arsace and Isménie, a novel; 1742)
- De l'esprit des lois ((On) The Spirit of Law, 1748) (volume 1 and volume 2 from Gallica)
- Défense de "L'Esprit des lois" (Defense of "The Spirit of Law", 1750)
- Essai sur le goût (Essay on Taste, published posthumously in 1757)
- Mes Pensées (My Thoughts, 1720–1755)

A critical edition of Montesquieu's works is being published by the Société Montesquieu. It is planned to total 22 volumes, of which (as of February 2022) all but five have appeared.

== See also ==
- Environmental determinism
- Liberalism
- List of abolitionist forerunners
- List of political systems in France
- List of liberal theorists
- Napoleon
- Politics of France
- Jean-Baptiste de Secondat (1716–1796), his son
- U.S. Constitution, influences
  - Bibliography of the United States Constitution — contains numerous works regarding Montesquieu's influence on American constitutionalism
