= La Brède =

- Commune
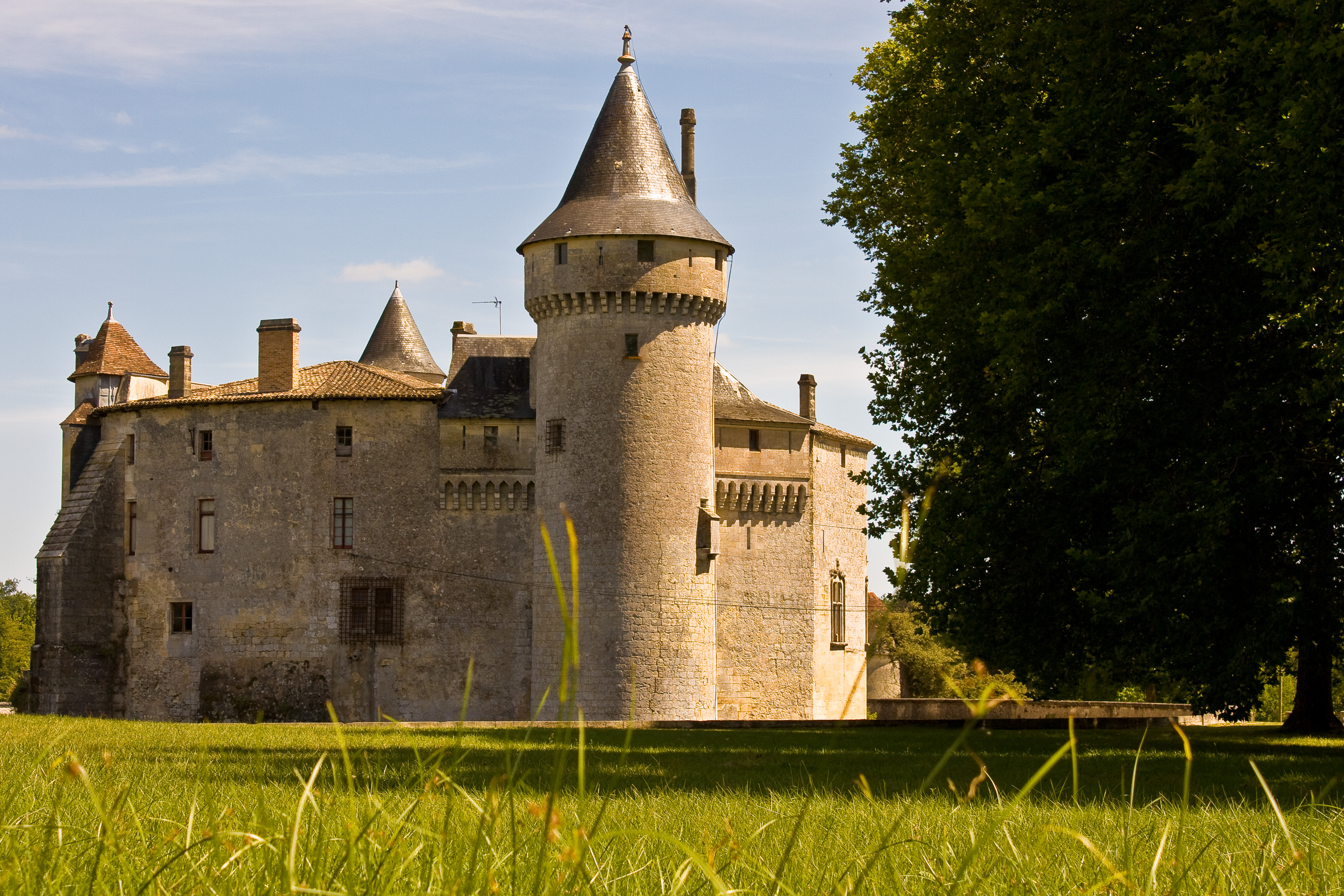
- Chateau

- Coat of arms
- Location of La Brède
- Location within France Location within Nouvelle-Aquitaine
- Coordinates: 44°40′56″N 0°31′38″W
- Country: France
- Region: Nouvelle-Aquitaine
- Department: Gironde
- Arrondissement: Bordeaux
- Canton: La Brède
- Intercommunality: Montesquieu

Government
  - Mayor (2020–2026): Michel Dufranc
- Area^{1}: 23.28 km^{2} (8.99 sq mi)
- Elevation: 26 m (85 ft)
- Highest elevation: 61 m (200 ft)
- Lowest elevation: 9 m (30 ft)
- Population (2023): 4,386
  - Density: 188.4/km^{2} (488.0/sq mi)
- Time zone: UTC+01:00 (CET)
  - Summer (DST): UTC+02:00 (CEST)
- INSEE/Postal code: 33213 /33650
- ^{1} French Land Register data, which excludes lakes, ponds, glaciers > 1 km^{2} (0.386 sq mi or 247 acres) and river estuaries.

La Brède (French pronunciation: [la bʁɛd]; Occitan: La Brèda, before 1987: Labrede) is a commune in the Gironde department in Nouvelle-Aquitaine in southwestern France.

The gothic Château de la Brède was the birthplace and the retreat of Montesquieu, whose library and bedroom are preserved.

== Population ==
Historical population
Year	Pop.	±% p.a.
1968	1,448	—
1975	1,769	+2.90%
1982	2,281	+3.70%
1990	2,846	+2.80%
1999	3,128	+1.06%
2007	3,662	+1.99%
2012	3,967	+1.61%
2017	4,280	+1.53%
2023	4,386	+0.41%
Source: INSEE

== See also ==
- Communes of the Gironde department
