= Château de la Brède =

Feudal castle in La Brède, Gironde, France

Coordinates: 44°40′45″N 0°32′39.7″W

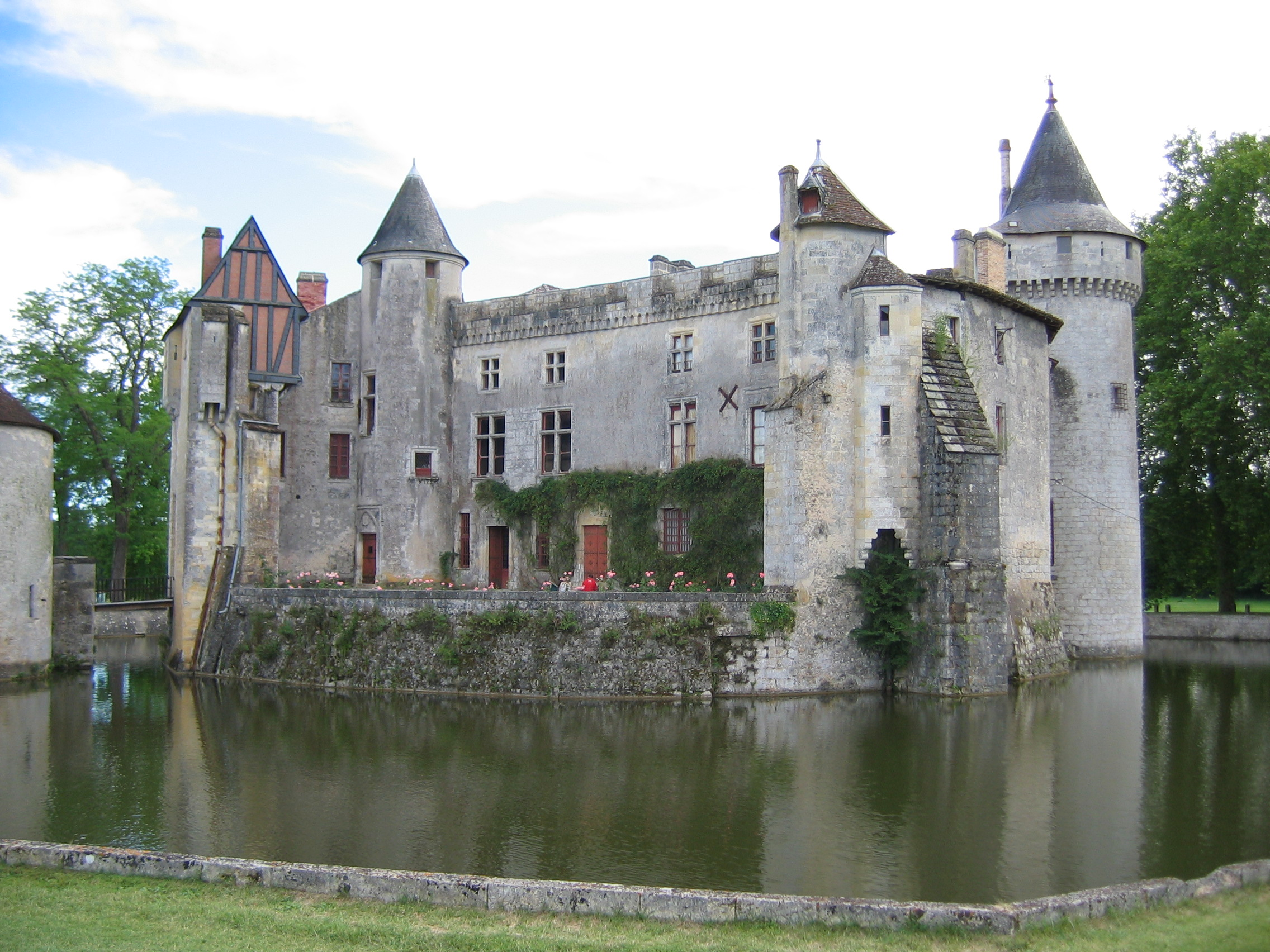
Château de la Brède

The Château de La Brède is a feudal castle in the commune of La Brède in the département of Gironde, France.

The castle was built in the Gothic style starting in 1306, on the site of an earlier castle. It is surrounded by water-filled moats and an English garden, in the centre of a Bordelais vineyard. Despite modifications over the centuries, it has kept its character as a fortress.

The philosopher Montesquieu (1689–1755), (full title: Charles Louis de Secondat, baron de La Brède et de Montesquieu) was born, lived and wrote the majority of his works here. Visitors may see his library (though the books have been transferred to the library in Bordeaux) and his bedroom, both preserved as they were in the 18th century.

At her death in 2004, the Countess of Chabannes, a descendant of Montesquieu and last owner of the château, bequeathed her belongings, including the castle, to the Foundation named after her.

The castle is open to visitors from Easter to 11 November. It is classed by the French Ministry of Culture as a monument historique.

== See also ==
- List of castles in France
