= Jean Leymarie (art historian) =

French art historian (1919–2006)

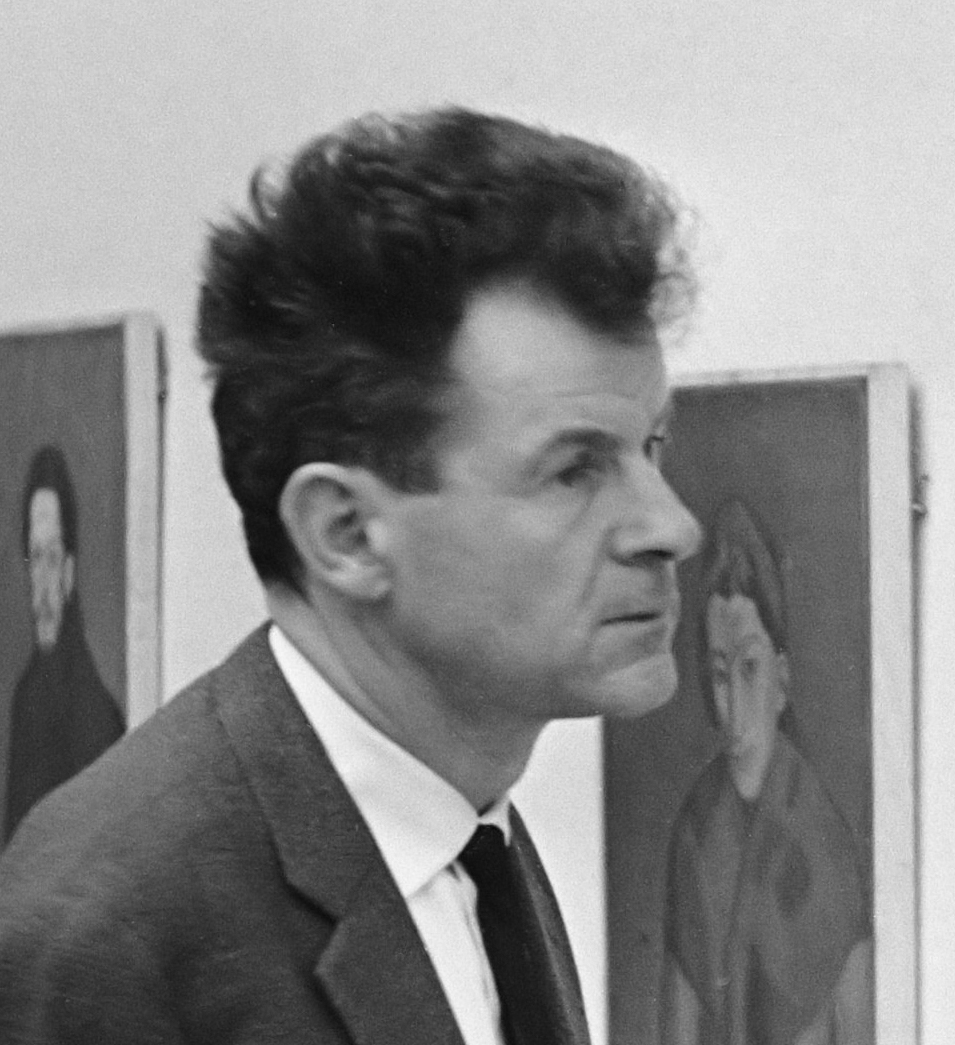
Jean Leymarie (1967)

Jean Leymarie (17 July 1919, Gagnac-sur-Cère, Lot – 9 March 2006) was a French art historian.

== Biography ==
Born into a peasant family, he pursued his studies in Toulouse then Paris. After the Second World War, he began his museum career. He was curator at Museum of Grenoble from 1950 to 1955, director of the Musée national d'Art moderne from 1968 to 1973 and director of the French Academy in Rome from 1979 to 1985. He taught for a long time at the Swiss universities of Lausanne and Geneva and published several works on the history of art. He remains one of those who imposed 20th-century painting on French national museums.

== Works ==
- Jerome Bosch (1949). Paris
- Impressionism I, before 1873 (1955). Editions d'Art Albert Skira, Geneva, 119 pp. (volume No. 11 from "The Taste of Our Time" series).
- Impressionism II, after 1873 (1955). Editions d'Art Albert Skira, Geneva, 139 pp. (volume No. 12 from "The Taste of Our Time" series).
- Dutch Painting (1956). Editions d'Art Albert Skira, Geneva, 213 pp. (from the "Painting, Color, History" series)
- Fauvism (1959). Editions d'Art Albert Skira, Geneva, 165 pp. (volume No. 28 from "The Taste of Our Time" series) by Leymarie & Emmons.
- Braque: Biographical and Critical Studies (1961). Editions d'Art Albert Skira, Geneva, 135 pp. (volume No. 35 from "The Taste of Our Time" series).
- French Painting: The Nineteenth Century (1962) Editions d'Art Albert Skira, Geneva 231 pp. (French Painting Volume III from the "Painting, Color, History" series)
- Hommage à Pablo Picasso : peintures (1966). Paris.
- Corot: Biographical and Critical Studies (1966). Editions d'Art Albert Skira, Geneva 140 pp. (volume No. 44 from "The Taste of Our Time" series).
- Picasso Drawings (1967). Editions d'Art Albert Skira, Geneva 107 pp. (unnumbered volume from "The Taste of Our Time" series).
- Qui était van Gogh? (1968). Skira
- Impressionist Drawings From Manet To Renoir (1969). Editions d'Art Albert Skira, Geneva 104 pp. (unnumbered volume from "The Taste of Our Time" series).
- Renoir (1978)
- Drawing: History of an Art (1979). Skira/Rizzoli International Publishing. New York, N. Y. 279 pp. (by J. Leymarie, G. Monnier, and B. Rose)
- Picasso, La monographie 1881-1973
- Watercolors: from Dürer to Balthus (1984). Skira/Rizzoli International Publishing. New York, N. Y. 139 pp.
- Le Fauvisme (1987)
- La campagne de Corot (1996)
- Balthus (1982)
- L'Aquarelle
- Fauves and Fauvism (1987). Skira/Rizzoli International Publishing. New York, N. Y. 120 pp.
- Marc Chagall: The Jerusalem Windows (1988)
- Geneviève Asse, co-witren with Sylvia Baron
- Gauguin (1990)
- Tal Coat (1992)
- Le Fauvisme (1992)
- Fenosa (1993)
- Yves rouvre
- Van Gogh a Arles: Dessins 1888–1889, Documents Originaux - Photographies
- Braque: Les ateliers (1995)
- Chanel (1987) documentation by Catherine Hubschmann (Editions d'Art Albert Skira S.A. Geneva)
