= Biars-sur-Cère =

- Commune
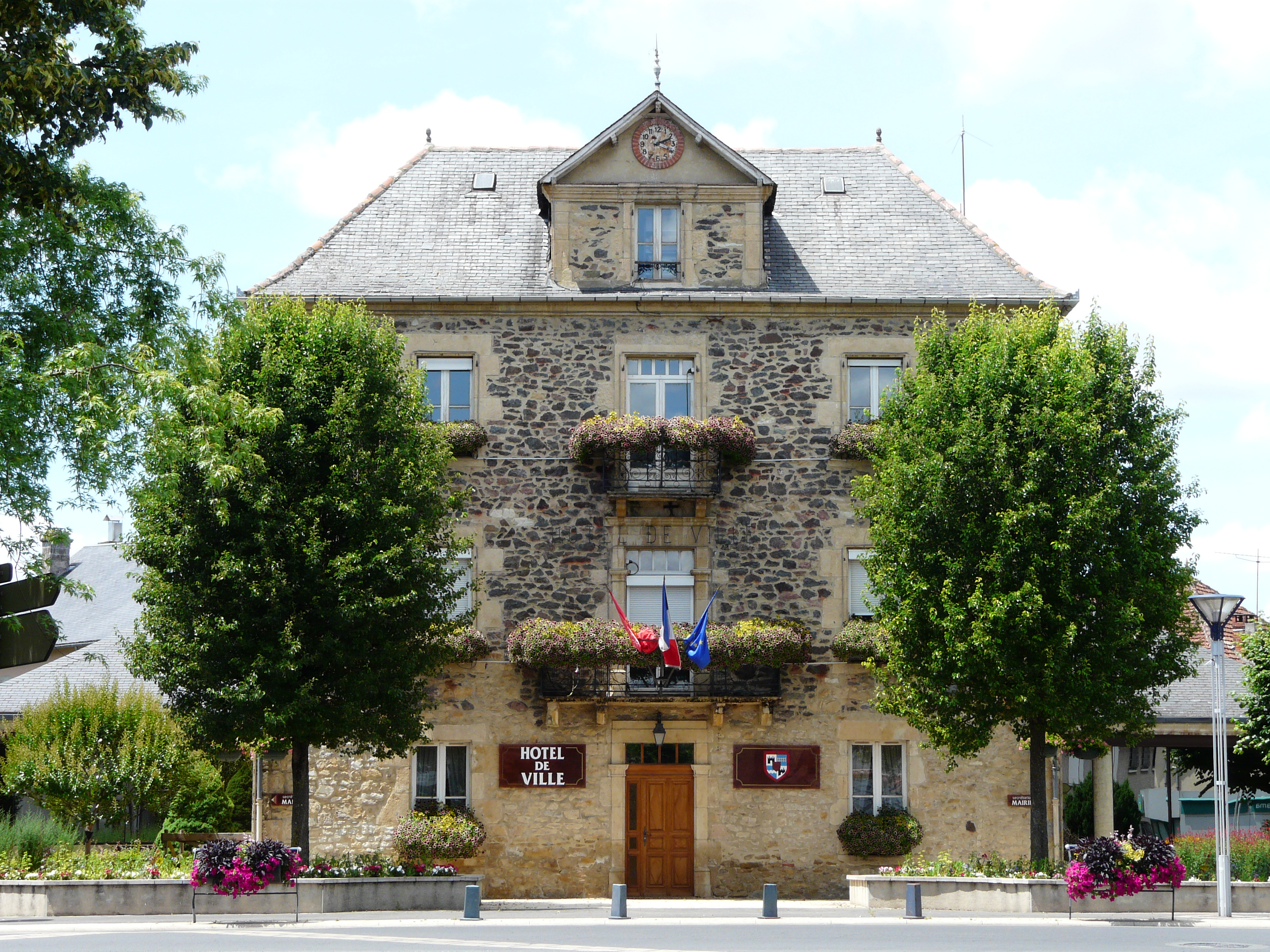
- The Town Hall of Biars-sur-Cère

- Coat of arms
- Location of Biars-sur-Cère
- Location within France Location within Occitanie
- Coordinates: 44°55′44″N 1°50′52″E
- Country: France
- Region: Occitania
- Department: Lot
- Arrondissement: Figeac
- Canton: Cère et Ségala

Government
  - Mayor (2024–2026): Angèle Preville
- Area^{1}: 3.63 km^{2} (1.40 sq mi)
- Elevation: 141 m (463 ft)
- Highest elevation: 265 m (869 ft)
- Lowest elevation: 125 m (410 ft)
- Population (2023): 1,957
  - Density: 539/km^{2} (1,400/sq mi)
- Time zone: UTC+01:00 (CET)
  - Summer (DST): UTC+02:00 (CEST)
- INSEE/Postal code: 46029 /46130
- ^{1} French Land Register data, which excludes lakes, ponds, glaciers > 1 km^{2} (0.386 sq mi or 247 acres) and river estuaries.

Biars-sur-Cère (French pronunciation: [bjaʁ syʁ sɛʁ], literally Biars on Cère; Lengadocian: Biard de Sera) is a commune in the Lot department located in southwestern France. It is the site of the headquarters of Andros, whose brands include Bonne Maman.

During World War II, Biars-sur-Cère villagers hid a number of Jews from Nazi persecution. It has been reported but not verified that among the families protecting Jews was the Chapoulart family who later founded Andros.

== Population ==
Historical population
Year	Pop.	±% p.a.
1968	1,273	—
1975	1,758	+4.72%
1982	1,954	+1.52%
1990	2,023	+0.43%
1999	1,983	−0.22%
2007	1,975	−0.05%
2012	1,933	−0.43%
2017	2,139	+2.05%
2023	1,957	−1.47%
Source: INSEE

== See also ==
- Communes of the Lot department
