= Lacam-d'Ourcet =

- Part of Sousceyrac-en-Quercy
- Location of Lacam-d'Ourcet
- Location within France Location within Occitanie
- Coordinates: 44°50′55″N 2°00′07″E
- Country: France
- Region: Occitania
- Department: Lot
- Arrondissement: Figeac
- Canton: Cère et Ségala
- Commune: Sousceyrac-en-Quercy
- Area^{1}: 14.08 km^{2} (5.44 sq mi)
- Elevation: 575 m (1,886 ft)
- Highest elevation: 624 m (2,047 ft)
- Lowest elevation: 306 m (1,004 ft)
- Population (2022): 105
  - Density: 7.46/km^{2} (19.3/sq mi)
- Time zone: UTC+01:00 (CET)
  - Summer (DST): UTC+02:00 (CEST)
- Postal code: 46190
- ^{1} French Land Register data, which excludes lakes, ponds, glaciers > 1 km^{2} (0.386 sq mi or 247 acres) and river estuaries.

Lacam-d'Ourcet (French pronunciation: [lakam duʁsɛ]; Languedocien: La Calm d’Orcet) is a former commune in the Lot department in south-western France. On 1 January 2016, it was merged into the new commune of Sousceyrac-en-Quercy. Its population was 105 in 2022.

== See also ==
- Communes of the Lot department
