= Calviac =

- Part of Sousceyrac-en-Quercy
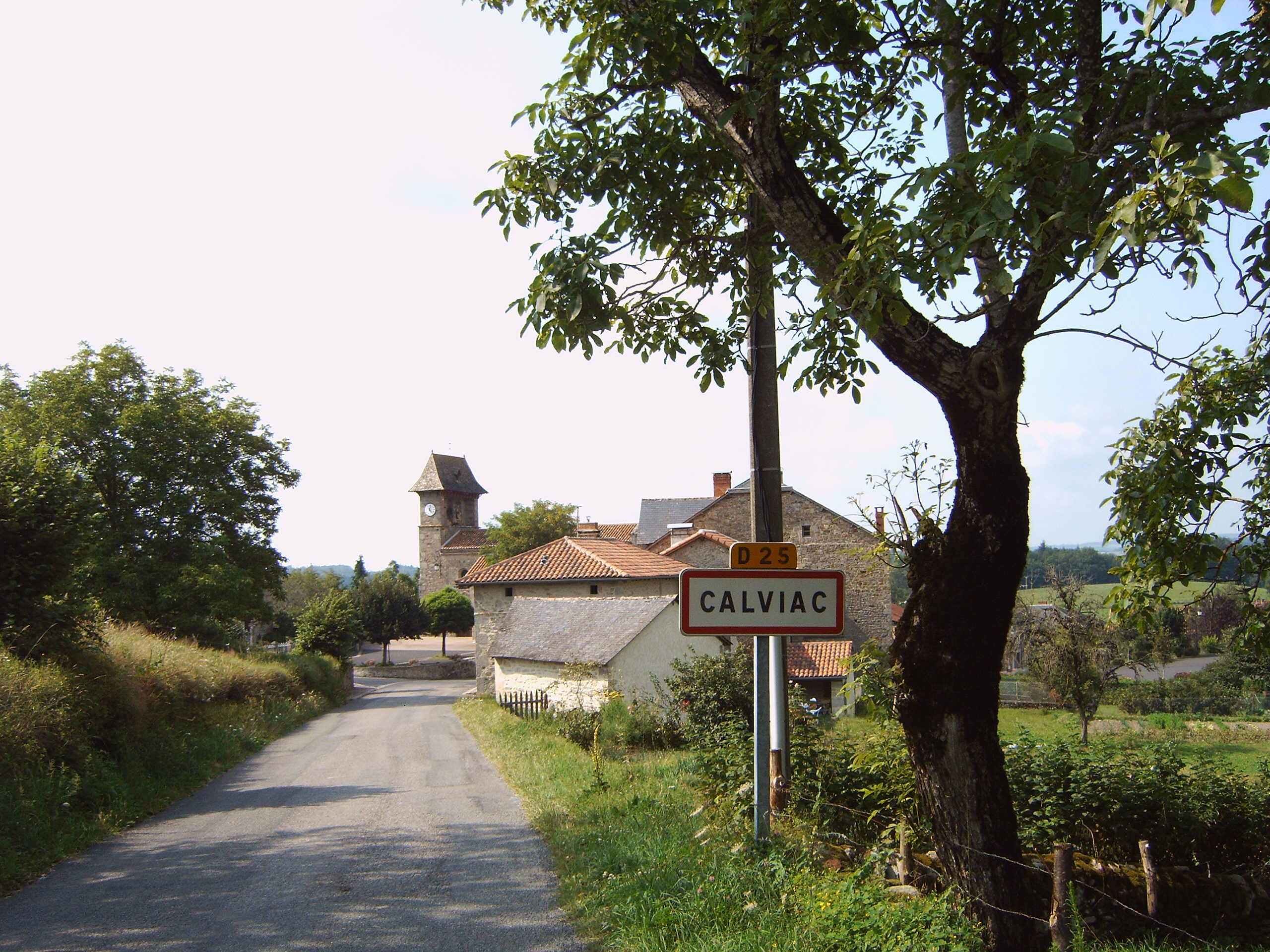
- The road into Calviac
- Location of Calviac
- Location within France Location within Occitanie
- Coordinates: 44°55′26″N 2°02′52″E
- Country: France
- Region: Occitania
- Department: Lot
- Arrondissement: Figeac
- Canton: Cère et Ségala
- Commune: Sousceyrac-en-Quercy
- Area^{1}: 26.49 km^{2} (10.23 sq mi)
- Elevation: 600 m (2,000 ft)
- Highest elevation: 691 m (2,267 ft)
- Lowest elevation: 515 m (1,690 ft)
- Population (2022): 149
  - Density: 5.62/km^{2} (14.6/sq mi)
- Time zone: UTC+01:00 (CET)
  - Summer (DST): UTC+02:00 (CEST)
- Postal code: 46190
- ^{1} French Land Register data, which excludes lakes, ponds, glaciers > 1 km^{2} (0.386 sq mi or 247 acres) and river estuaries.

Calviac (French pronunciation: [kalvjak]) is a former commune in the Lot department in south-western France. On 1 January 2016, it was merged into the new commune of Sousceyrac-en-Quercy. Its population was 149 in 2022.

== See also ==
- Communes of the Lot department
