= Cornac =

Cornac may refer to:

- a person who drives an elephant, see mahout
- Cornac, a commune of the Lot département in France
