= Andros (company) =

French food company specialized in fruit

- Company type: Private
- Industry: Food
- Incorporated: France
- Founded: 1959; 67 years ago
- Founder: Jean Gervoson; Pierre Chapoulart
- Headquarters: Biars-sur-Cère, France
- Number of locations: 44 factories (2021)
- Area served: Worldwide
- Key people: Frédéric Gervoson (chairman)
- Products: Fruit juice; jam; compotes; biscuits; candies
- Brands: Andros Chef; Biscuiterie Saint-Michel; Bonne Maman; Buddy Fruits; Mamie Nova; Pierrot Gourmand; Solo Italia
- Revenue: ▲€2.4 billion (2020)
- Number of employees: 10,000 (2021)
- Subsidiaries: Andros Asia; Andros Barker's (Australia and New Zealand); Andros Foods North America; Andros United Kingdom; Los Nietitos (Uruguay)
- Website: www.andros.fr

Andros is a French multinational food company specializing in fruit and dairy products. The company is based in Biars-sur-Cère, in the Lot department, near the touristic Dordogne region and the city of Brive-la-Gaillarde, Corrèze.

Andros owns more than forty factories all over the world, including production plants in China, Vietnam, and Virginia, US.

The family-owned company is well known for its long term primary sponsorship of the ice rallycross championship Andros Trophy and French rugby union club CA Brive.

== History ==
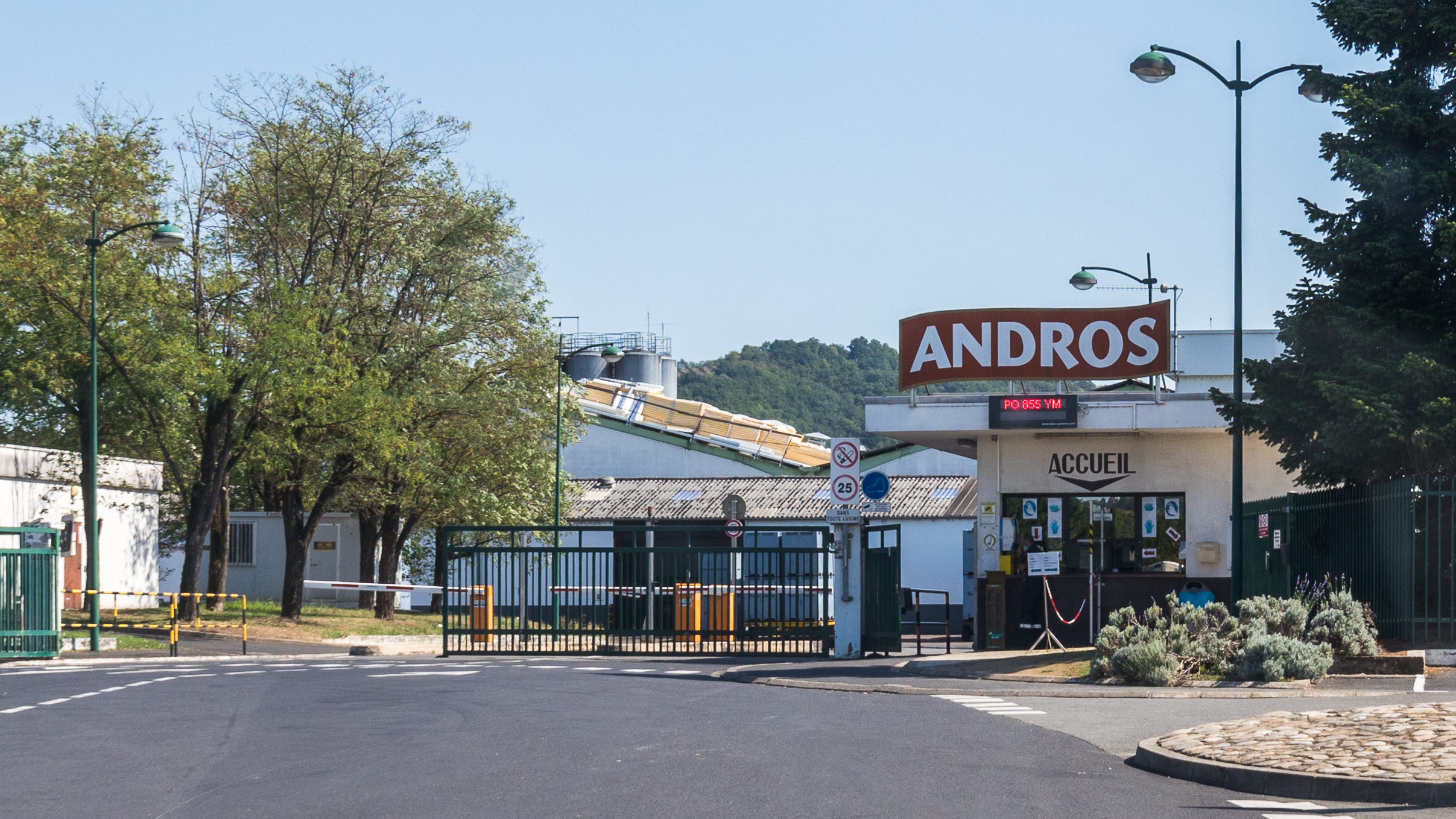
Andros factory in Biars-sur-Cère

At the end of the Second World War, Jean Gervoson started a jam business headquartered near Brive-la-Gaillarde, in Biars-sur-Cère in the Lot. In 1971, Gervoson created the Bonne Maman brand. In 1976, Andros bought the factory from the company Pierrot Gourmand, a bankrupt manufacturer of lollipops, and used the production sites for the manufacture of sweets.

In 2000, Jean Gervoson left the management of the group in favor of his two sons: Frédéric Gervoson assumed control of Andros and Bonne Maman jams, while Xavier Gervoson headed Bonne Maman cakes.

At the end of the 2010s, the group began to shift towards environmental consciousness. In 2018, Andros launched Andros Gourmand & Végétal, a brand of desserts in the fresh section made from coconut milk and almond milk to act as a low-carbon alternative to cows' milk yoghurts. At the end of 2020, Andros launched a recyclable compote gourd.

The Gervoson-Chapoulart family, owners of the group, had a fortune estimated at €1.2 billion in 2017.

== Activities and brands ==
Andros brands include Andros Chef (gastronomic fruit products for catering); Biscuiterie Saint-Michel, a French manufacturer of cakes and biscuits; Bonne Maman, a French manufacturer of jam, marmalade, compotes, desserts, cakes and biscuits; Buddy Fruits (ready-to-eat fruit snacks); Mamie Nova (yogurts), Pierrot Gourmand (candies), and Solo Italia (frozen desserts). As of 2017, the company represented 19.5% of fruit juices in the fresh section, 47% of jams, and 62.4% of refrigerated compotes.

=== Biscuits ===
Bonne Maman and Saint-Michel biscuits are produced by Morina Baie Biscuits, a company owned by Andros. The company's revenue was estimated at 450 million euros in 2019.

=== Subcontracting and distributor brands ===
The Andros group also produces frozen yoghurts, marmalades, confectionery, and desserts for large-scale distribution companies such as Carrefour. Andros also produces the filling for Whaou pancakes, Lidl gourds, and Picard Yule logs.

== Subsidiaries and factories ==
Andros Asia logo

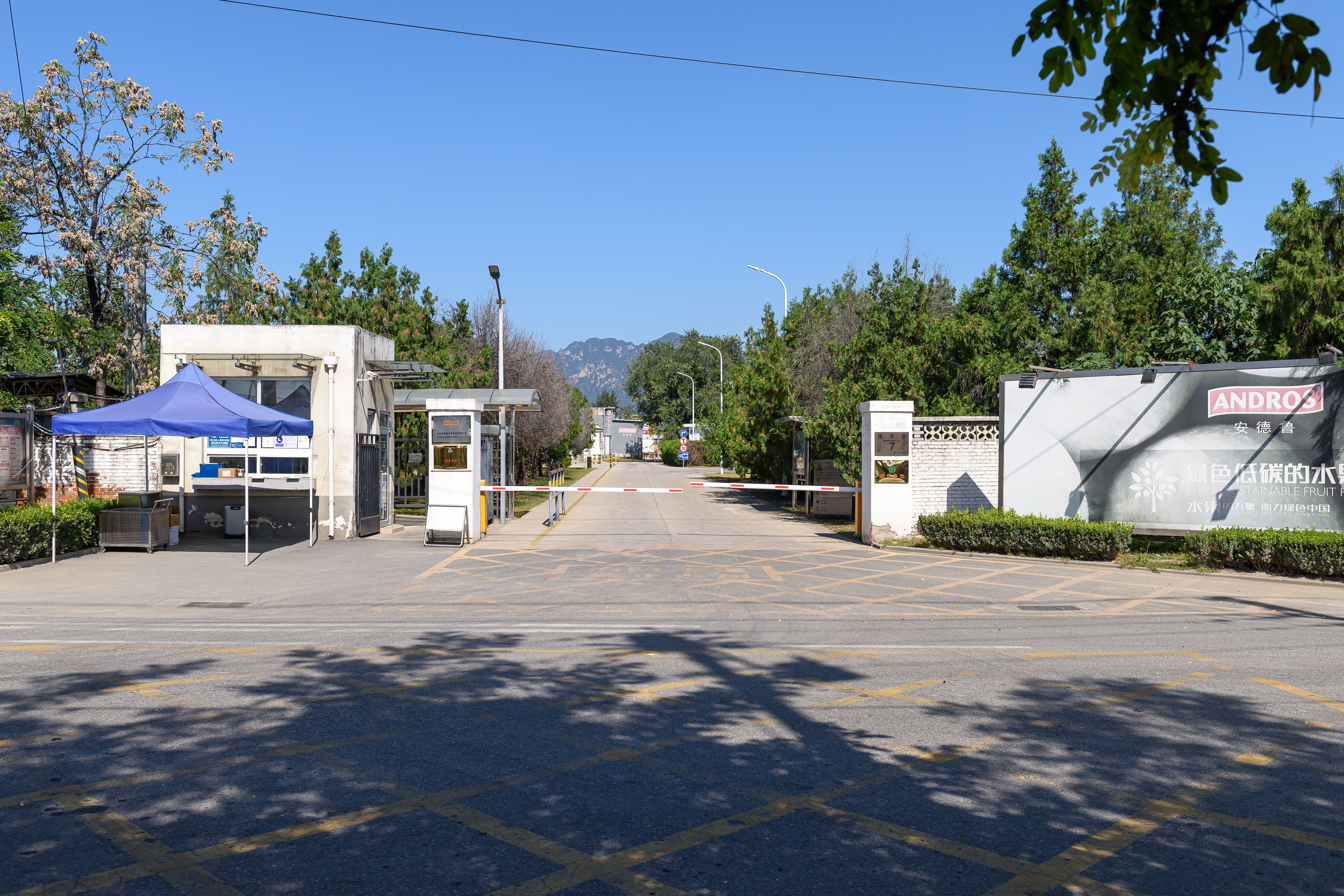
Beijing Andros Fruit Corporation Limited in Nankou, Beijing

Andros have many subsidiaries around the world: Andros Asia in China, Japan and Vietnam; Andros Barker's in Australia and New Zealand after Barker's was bought by Andros in 2015; Andros Foods North America in the United States, and Los Nietitos in Uruguay.

Andros Asia operates three factories (two in Vietnam and one in China, which opened in 1999) and distributes its products in eleven countries in Southeast Asia and East Asia.

Andros Foods North America operates a factory in Virginia. In 2012, Andros purchased Bowman Andros Products in Mount Jackson, a leader in private label apple product production since 1939. Old Virginia and Buddy Fruits products are made domestically there.

In May 2022, near the Biars-sur-Cère main factory, Andros opened a new transformation industrial site in Brive-la-Gaillarde, strengthening even more its influence in its native area.

== Sponsoring ==
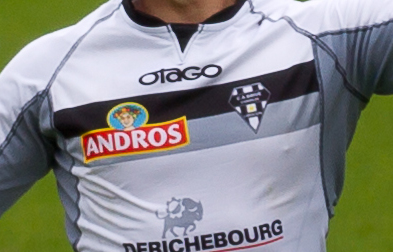
Andros logo on 2011–12 Brive jersey

Andros has invested heavily in sports. The group sponsors the Andros Trophy, an ice rallycross motorsport championship contest held in France since 1990, the Image Club d'Épinal, an ice hockey team, and French rugby union club CA Brive. A locally rooted firm, Andros is one of the most loyal and oldest of the Corrèze club and appeared season after season on the club's jerseys as a main sponsor. The firm appeared on the 1996–97 Heineken Cup winners' jerseys when Brive defeated Leicester Tigers in final. Xavier Ric, one of the current Brive officials, worked for Andros. Some former Brive players, such as Jean-Luc Joinel, Cédric Heymans, and Alain Penaud, work for the company.

More recently, Andros became sponsor of the French National Rugby League, the French Olympic Committee (CNOSF), rugby union club Racing 92 and the 2023 Rugby World Cup.

The firm also operates as a provider and a supplier for these clubs and institutions, offering fruit products for the clubs' meals and children's games.

== Controversies ==
In March 2015, Novandie, a subsidiary of the Andros group, along with eight other companies, was sentenced in a “yoghurt cartel” case for consipiring on the prices of dairy products. They were initially subjected to a fine of 38.3 million euros, but in 2017, the Paris Court of Appeal reduced the fine to 35 million euros.

In 2019, the Andros group was again convicted by the Competition Authority in the "compote cartel" case for forming a cartel with other businesses in the compote market to co-ordinate price increases. Initially subject to a 14 million euro fine, the fine was reduced as the investigation noted that "this company had, over the first two years of the cartel, 'disrupted' the operation of the cartel by behaving as a 'maverick' by continuing to conduct an aggressive commercial policy to gain market share."
