= Lamativie =

- Part of Sousceyrac-en-Quercy
- Location of Lamativie
- Location within France Location within Occitanie
- Coordinates: 44°57′39″N 2°02′29″E
- Country: France
- Region: Occitania
- Department: Lot
- Arrondissement: Figeac
- Canton: Cère et Ségala
- Commune: Sousceyrac-en-Quercy
- Area^{1}: 12.82 km^{2} (4.95 sq mi)
- Elevation: 566 m (1,857 ft)
- Highest elevation: 643 m (2,110 ft)
- Lowest elevation: 267 m (876 ft)
- Population (2022): 55
  - Density: 4.3/km^{2} (11/sq mi)
- Time zone: UTC+01:00 (CET)
  - Summer (DST): UTC+02:00 (CEST)
- Postal code: 46190
- ^{1} French Land Register data, which excludes lakes, ponds, glaciers > 1 km^{2} (0.386 sq mi or 247 acres) and river estuaries.

Lamativie (French pronunciation: [lamativi]; Languedocien: La Mativiá) is a former commune in the Lot department in south-western France. On 1 January 2016, it was merged into the new commune of Sousceyrac-en-Quercy. Its population was 55 in 2022.

== See also ==
- Communes of the Lot department
