= Château de Grugnac =

Coordinates: 44.8852°N 2.0249°E

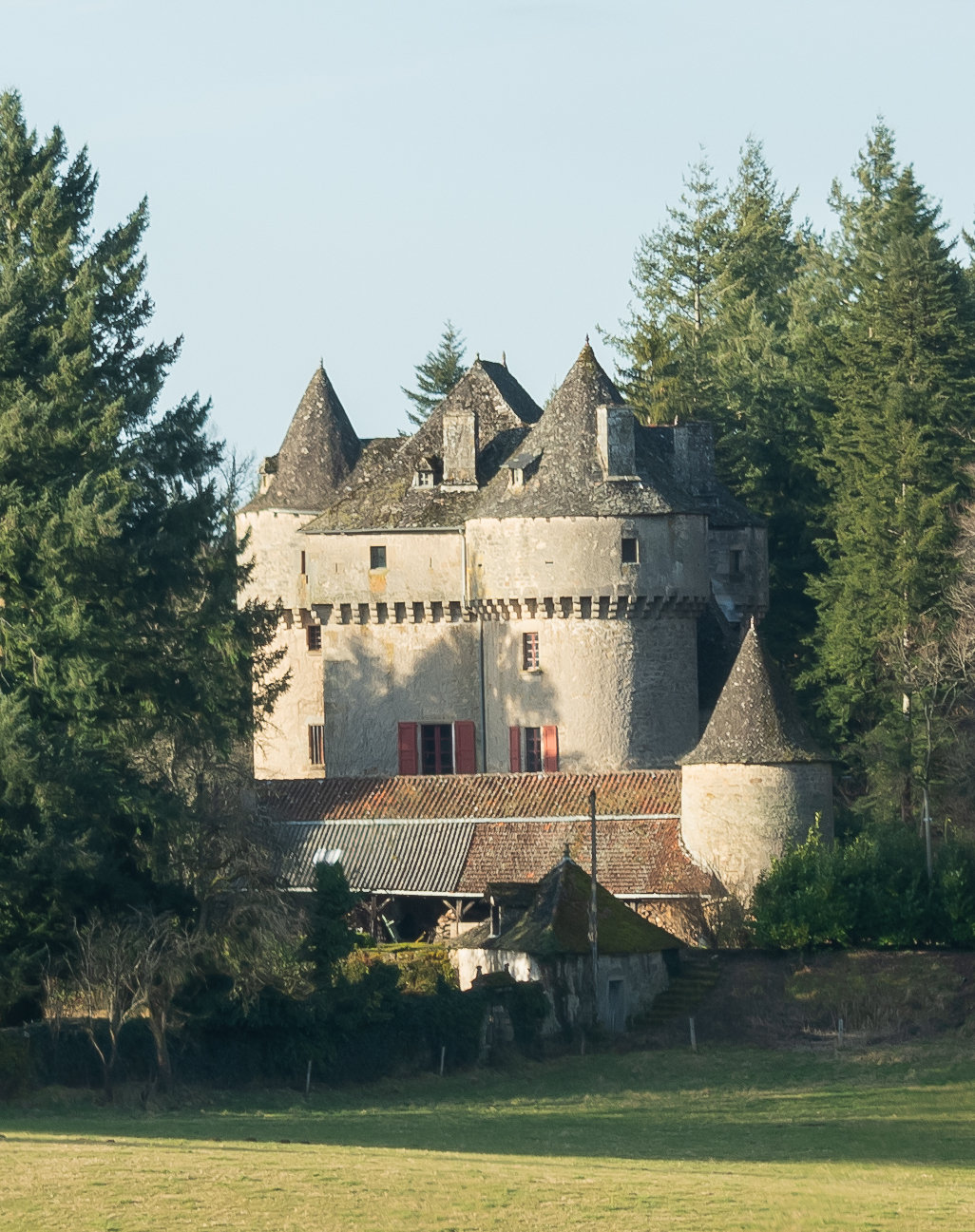
Château de Grugnac viewed in 2022

The Château de Grugnac is a castle in the commune of Sousceyrac in the Lot département of France.

The fortress was built in the 15th century by the Viscounts of Turenne to watch over the falconry of the Duke of Luynes. The rectangular plan edifice is flanked in the north by two round towers, with a third in the main façade. The building is surmounted by a chemin de ronde with machicolation. Inside, the various floors are served by a spiral staircase in the south tower. Each level has a single room. The lowest floor has a kitchen and dining room. The first floor is occupied by a large salon. The bedrooms are situated in the towers and the building attached to the north.

The Château de Grugnac is privately owned and is not open to the public. It has been listed since 1989 as a monument historique by the French Ministry of Culture.

== See also ==
- List of castles in France
