= Tauriac, Lot =

Tauriac
- Commune
- Coat of arms
- Location of Tauriac
- Location within France Location within Occitanie
- Coordinates: 44°54′26″N 1°46′36″E
- Country: France
- Region: Occitania
- Department: Lot
- Arrondissement: Figeac
- Canton: Cère et Ségala
- Intercommunality: Causses et Vallée de la Dordogne

Government
  - Mayor (2020–2026): Catherine Jauzac
- Area^{1}: 8.23 km^{2} (3.18 sq mi)
- Elevation: 124 m (407 ft)
- Highest elevation: 169 m (554 ft)
- Lowest elevation: 114 m (374 ft)
- Population (2023): 473
  - Density: 57.5/km^{2} (149/sq mi)
- Time zone: UTC+01:00 (CET)
  - Summer (DST): UTC+02:00 (CEST)
- INSEE/Postal code: 46313 /46130
- ^{1} French Land Register data, which excludes lakes, ponds, glaciers > 1 km^{2} (0.386 sq mi or 247 acres) and river estuaries.

Tauriac (French pronunciation: [toʁjak]) is a commune in the Lot department in south-western France.

== Toponymy ==
The toponym Tauriac, of Gallo-Roman origin, is based on an anthroponym Taurius or Torius. The ending -ac comes from the Gallic suffix -acon (itself from the common Celtic *-āko-), often Latinized as -acum in texts. This is the domain of Taurius.

== Local culture and heritage ==
=== Places and monuments ===
- Église Saint-Martial de Tauriac, from the sixteenth century. The building was classified as a historical monument in 1987. Several objects are referenced in the Palissy database. The church was built in the first half of the sixteenth century, as evidenced by the date 1549 inscribed on a keystone. The first mention of a church is a deed of 930 donating the church to the abbey of Saint-Pierre de Beaulieu-sur-Dordogne by Adémar, viscount of the Échelles. Following a request in 1281 by the abbot of Dalon to found a bastide in this place, a second church was built at the end of the thirteenth century at the current site in the bastide.

=== Notable personalities ===
- Maria Valtat, née Layna, (1895–1977), member of the PCF, and of the FTPF, a resistance fighter, creator and organizer of the National Front of the Resistance in Avalonnais.

== See also ==
- Communes of the Lot department
