= Sousceyrac =

Commune in Lot, France

- Part of Sousceyrac-en-Quercy
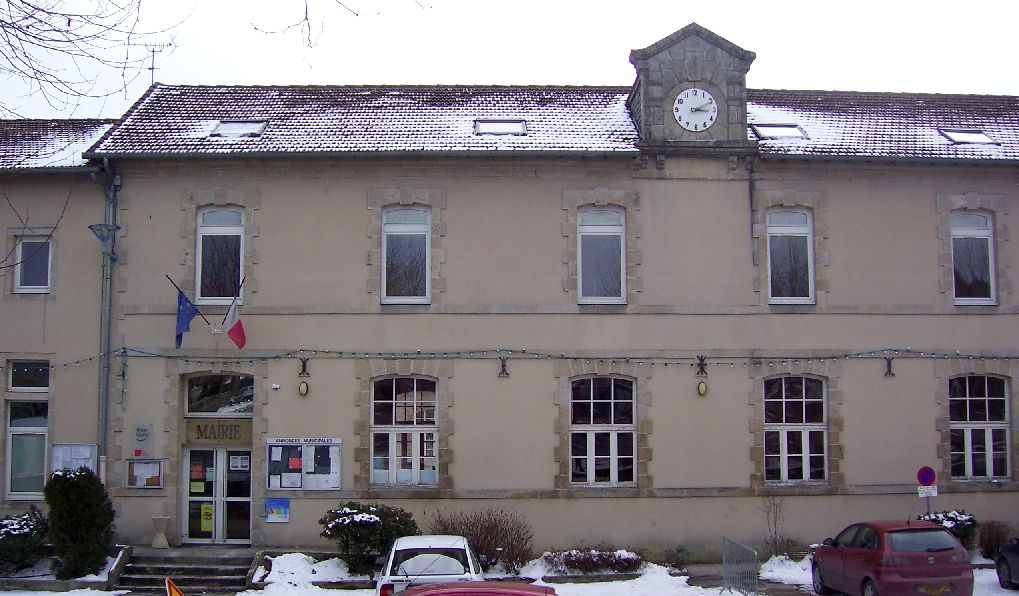
- The town hall in Sousceyrac
- Location of Sousceyrac
- Location within France Location within Occitanie
- Coordinates: 44°52′27″N 2°02′11″E
- Country: France
- Region: Occitania
- Department: Lot
- Arrondissement: Figeac
- Canton: Cère et Ségala
- Commune: Sousceyrac-en-Quercy
- Area^{1}: 57.64 km^{2} (22.25 sq mi)
- Elevation: 559 m (1,834 ft)
- Highest elevation: 745 m (2,444 ft)
- Lowest elevation: 399 m (1,309 ft)
- Population (2022): 814
  - Density: 14.1/km^{2} (36.6/sq mi)
- Time zone: UTC+01:00 (CET)
  - Summer (DST): UTC+02:00 (CEST)
- Postal code: 46190
- ^{1} French Land Register data, which excludes lakes, ponds, glaciers > 1 km^{2} (0.386 sq mi or 247 acres) and river estuaries.

Sousceyrac (French pronunciation: [suseʁak]; Languedocien: Soçairac) is a former commune in the Lot department in south-western France. On 1 January 2016, it was merged into the new commune of Sousceyrac-en-Quercy.

== See also ==
- Communes of the Lot department
