= Saint-Michel-Loubéjou =

- Commune
- Location of Saint-Michel-Loubéjou
- Location within France Location within Occitanie
- Coordinates: 44°53′45″N 1°51′03″E
- Country: France
- Region: Occitania
- Department: Lot
- Arrondissement: Figeac
- Canton: Cère et Ségala

Government
  - Mayor (2020–2026): Marie-Hélène Cantarel
- Area^{1}: 5.25 km^{2} (2.03 sq mi)
- Elevation: 370 m (1,210 ft)
- Highest elevation: 293 m (961 ft)
- Lowest elevation: 136 m (446 ft)
- Population (2023): 418
  - Density: 79.6/km^{2} (206/sq mi)
- Time zone: UTC+01:00 (CET)
  - Summer (DST): UTC+02:00 (CEST)
- INSEE/Postal code: 46284 /46130
- ^{1} French Land Register data, which excludes lakes, ponds, glaciers > 1 km^{2} (0.386 sq mi or 247 acres) and river estuaries.

Saint-Michel-Loubéjou (French pronunciation: [sɛ̃ miʃɛl lubeʒu]; Occitan: Sent Miquèl Lo Veson) is a commune in the Lot department in south-western France.

== See also ==
- Communes of the Lot department
