= Teyssieu =

- Commune
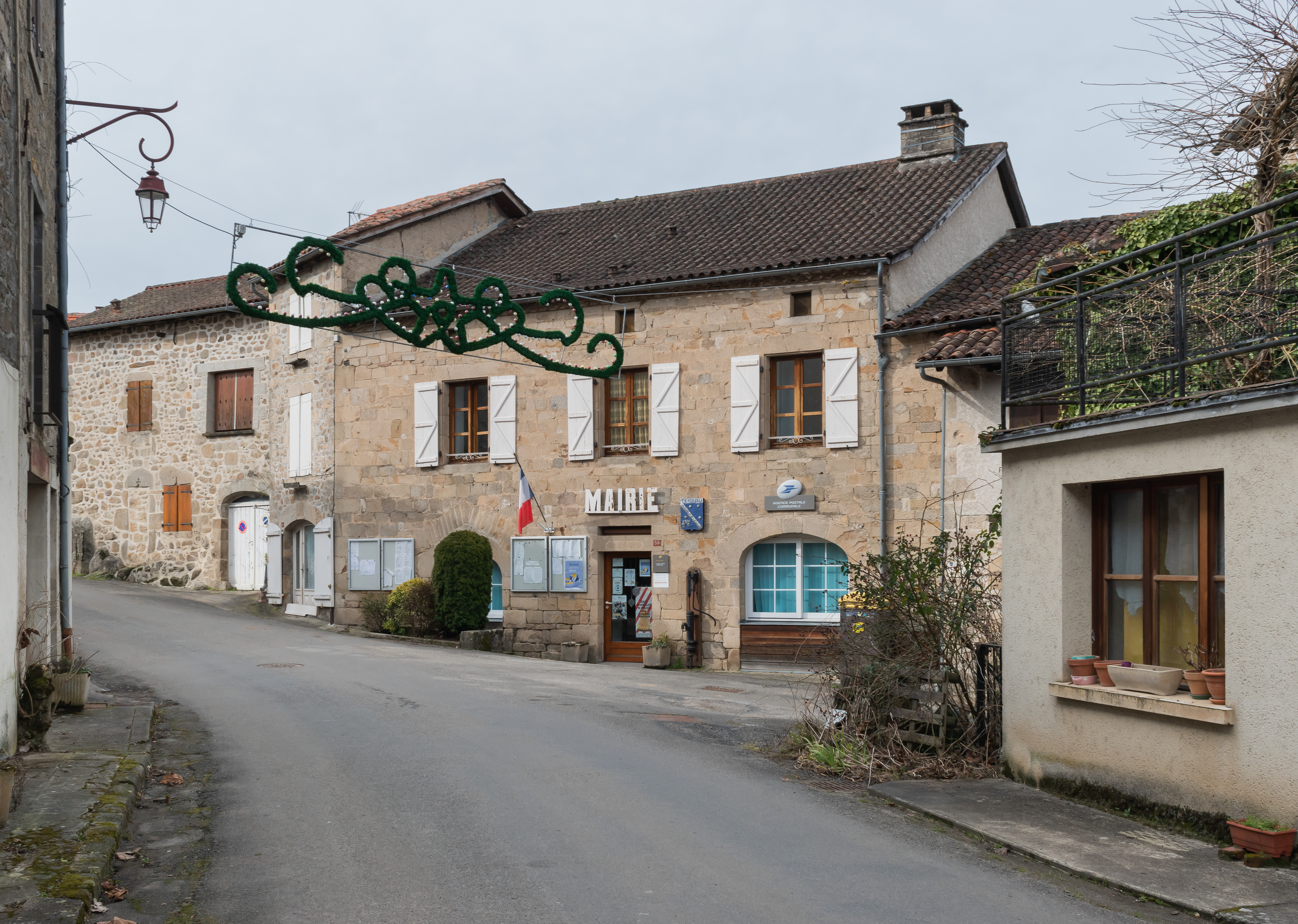
- Town hall of Teyssieu

- Coat of arms
- Location of Teyssieu
- Location within France Location within Occitanie
- Coordinates: 44°55′09″N 1°57′20″E
- Country: France
- Region: Occitania
- Department: Lot
- Arrondissement: Figeac
- Canton: Cère et Ségala
- Intercommunality: Causses et Vallée de la Dordogne

Government
  - Mayor (2020–2026): Sylvain Diaz
- Area^{1}: 13.63 km^{2} (5.26 sq mi)
- Elevation: 425 m (1,394 ft)
- Highest elevation: 566 m (1,857 ft)
- Lowest elevation: 233 m (764 ft)
- Population (2023): 162
  - Density: 11.9/km^{2} (30.8/sq mi)
- Time zone: UTC+01:00 (CET)
  - Summer (DST): UTC+02:00 (CEST)
- INSEE/Postal code: 46315 /46190
- ^{1} French Land Register data, which excludes lakes, ponds, glaciers > 1 km^{2} (0.386 sq mi or 247 acres) and river estuaries.

Teyssieu (French pronunciation: [tɛsjø]; Occitan: Teissiu) is a commune in the Lot department in south-western France.

== See also ==
- Communes of the Lot department
