= Sousceyrac-en-Quercy =

- Commune
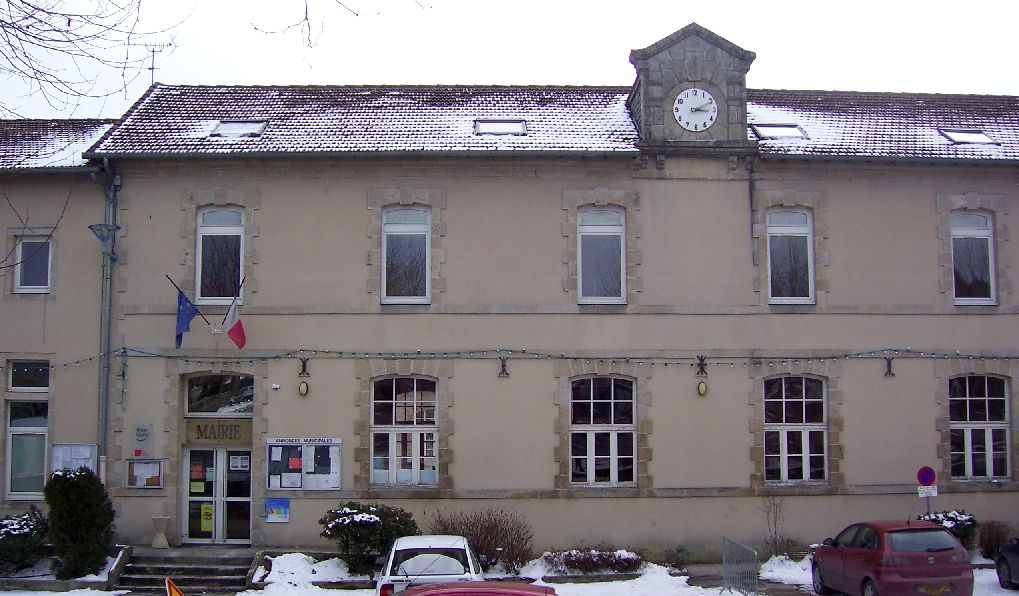
- The town hall of Sousceyrac
- Location of Sousceyrac-en-Quercy
- Location within France Location within Occitanie
- Coordinates: 44°52′23″N 2°02′10″E
- Country: France
- Region: Occitania
- Department: Lot
- Arrondissement: Figeac
- Canton: Cère et Ségala

Government
  - Mayor (2020–2026): Francis Laborie
- Area^{1}: 140.3 km^{2} (54.2 sq mi)
- Population (2023): 1,328
  - Density: 9.465/km^{2} (24.52/sq mi)
- Time zone: UTC+01:00 (CET)
  - Summer (DST): UTC+02:00 (CEST)
- INSEE/Postal code: 46311 /46190
- ^{1} French Land Register data, which excludes lakes, ponds, glaciers > 1 km^{2} (0.386 sq mi or 247 acres) and river estuaries.

Sousceyrac-en-Quercy (French pronunciation: [suseʁak ɑ̃ kɛʁsi], literally Sousceyrac in Quercy; Languedocien: Soçairac en Carcin) is a commune in the department of Lot, southern France. The municipality was established on 1 January 2016 by merger of the former communes of Sousceyrac, Calviac, Comiac, Lacam-d'Ourcet and Lamativie.

== See also ==
- Communes of the Lot department
