= Belmont-Bretenoux =

- Commune
- Coat of arms
- Location of Belmont-Bretenoux
- Location within France Location within Occitanie
- Coordinates: 44°53′27″N 1°52′50″E
- Country: France
- Region: Occitania
- Department: Lot
- Arrondissement: Figeac
- Canton: Cère et Ségala

Government
  - Mayor (2020–2026): Philippe Rodrigue
- Area^{1}: 6.65 km^{2} (2.57 sq mi)
- Elevation: 340 m (1,120 ft)
- Highest elevation: 406 m (1,332 ft)
- Lowest elevation: 146 m (479 ft)
- Population (2023): 408
  - Density: 61.4/km^{2} (159/sq mi)
- Time zone: UTC+01:00 (CET)
  - Summer (DST): UTC+02:00 (CEST)
- INSEE/Postal code: 46024 /46130
- ^{1} French Land Register data, which excludes lakes, ponds, glaciers > 1 km^{2} (0.386 sq mi or 247 acres) and river estuaries.

Belmont-Bretenoux (French pronunciation: [bɛlmɔ̃ bʁətnu]; Occitan: Bèlmont) is a commune in the Lot department in southwestern France.

== Toponymy ==
The name Belmont is formed from the medieval terms bèl (beautiful) and mont (mountain). The current name dates from 1929.

== History ==
The earliest mention of the village in the vicaria Exitense is 878 when Gauzfred, son of Count Gotafrid, donated a church there dedicated to Saint Cyr (Cyr of Tarsus), to the Abbey of Beaulieu.

== Demographics ==
Historical population
Year	Pop.	±% p.a.
1968	211	—
1975	211	+0.00%
1982	255	+2.74%
1990	311	+2.51%
1999	323	+0.42%
2007	318	−0.19%
2012	370	+3.08%
2017	401	+1.62%
2023	408	+0.29%
Source: INSEE

== See also ==
- Communes of the Lot department
