= Gintrac =

- Commune
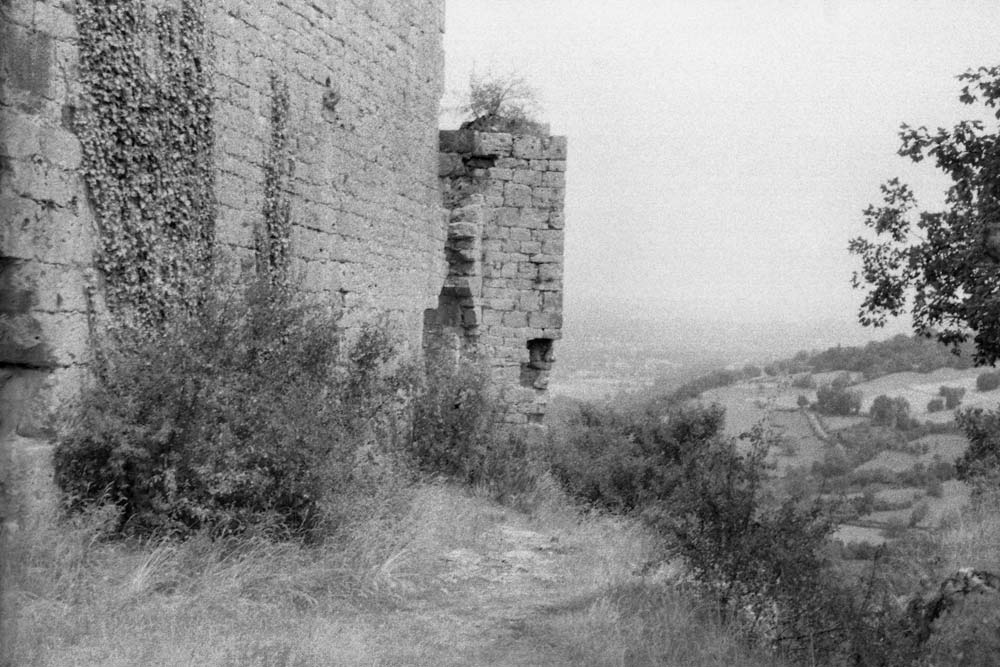
- The ruins of the château of Taillefer, in Gintrac
- Location of Gintrac
- Location within France Location within Occitanie
- Coordinates: 44°53′46″N 1°45′48″E
- Country: France
- Region: Occitania
- Department: Lot
- Arrondissement: Figeac
- Canton: Cère et Ségala
- Intercommunality: Causses et Vallée de la Dordogne

Government
  - Mayor (2024–2026): Olivier Fregeac
- Area^{1}: 6.79 km^{2} (2.62 sq mi)
- Elevation: 95 m (312 ft)
- Highest elevation: 368 m (1,207 ft)
- Lowest elevation: 119 m (390 ft)
- Population (2023): 90
  - Density: 13/km^{2} (34/sq mi)
- Time zone: UTC+01:00 (CET)
  - Summer (DST): UTC+02:00 (CEST)
- INSEE/Postal code: 46122 /46130
- ^{1} French Land Register data, which excludes lakes, ponds, glaciers > 1 km^{2} (0.386 sq mi or 247 acres) and river estuaries.

Gintrac (French pronunciation: [ʒɛ̃tʁak]) is a commune in the Lot department in south-western France.

== See also ==
- Communes of the Lot department
