= Cahus =

- Commune
- Coat of arms
- Location of Cahus
- Location within France Location within Occitanie
- Coordinates: 44°57′27″N 1°55′12″E
- Country: France
- Region: Occitania
- Department: Lot
- Arrondissement: Figeac
- Canton: Cère et Ségala
- Intercommunality: Causses et Vallée de la Dordogne

Government
  - Mayor (2020–2026): Catherine Albert
- Area^{1}: 10.01 km^{2} (3.86 sq mi)
- Elevation: 460 m (1,510 ft)
- Highest elevation: 505 m (1,657 ft)
- Lowest elevation: 139 m (456 ft)
- Population (2023): 185
  - Density: 18.5/km^{2} (47.9/sq mi)
- Time zone: UTC+01:00 (CET)
  - Summer (DST): UTC+02:00 (CEST)
- INSEE/Postal code: 46043 /46130
- ^{1} French Land Register data, which excludes lakes, ponds, glaciers > 1 km^{2} (0.386 sq mi or 247 acres) and river estuaries.

Cahus is a commune in the Lot department in south-western France.

== See also ==
- Communes of the Lot department
