= Laval-de-Cère =

- Commune
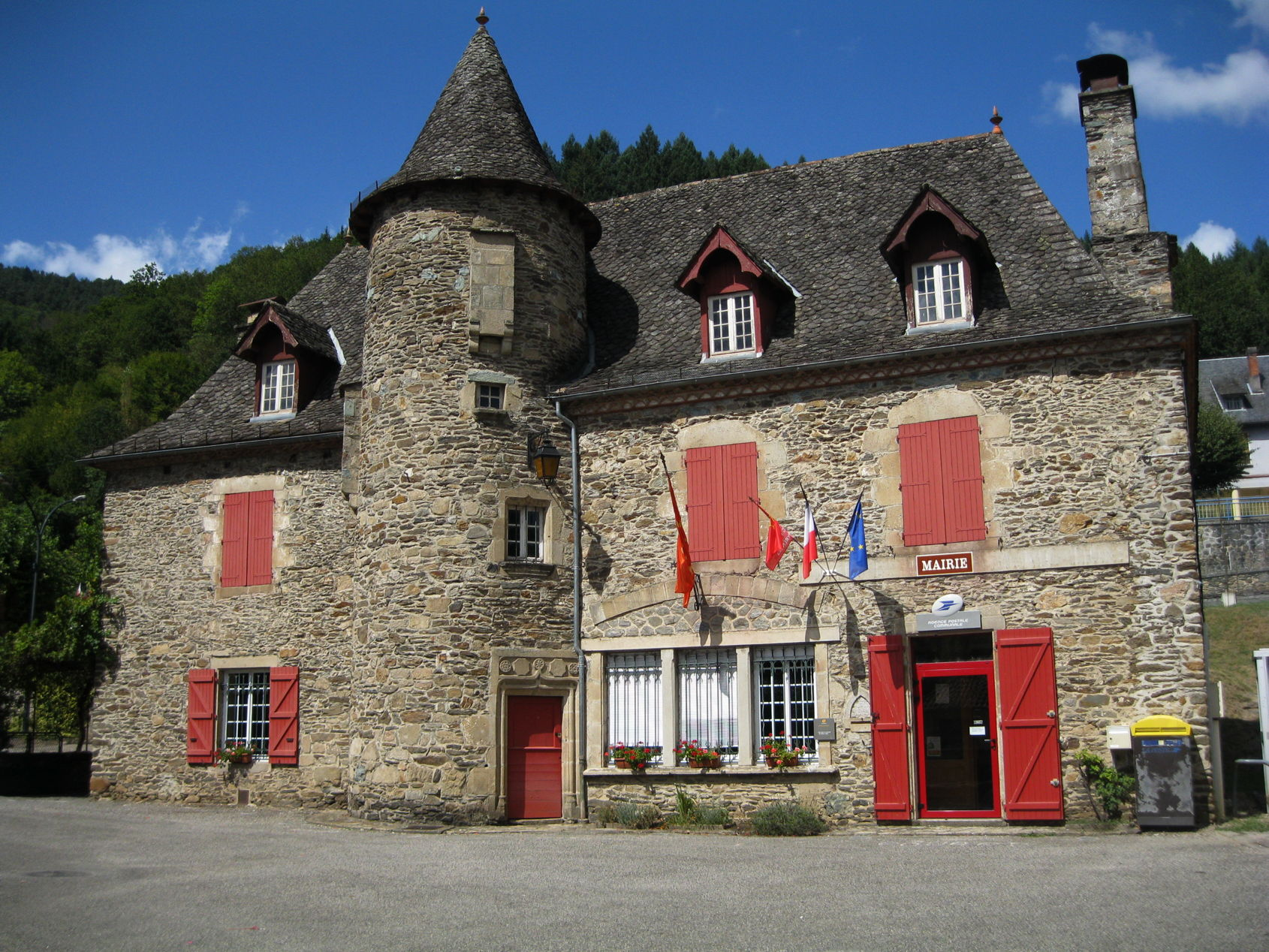
- The town hall in Laval-de-Cère
- Location of Laval-de-Cère
- Location within France Location within Occitanie
- Coordinates: 44°57′12″N 1°56′06″E
- Country: France
- Region: Occitania
- Department: Lot
- Arrondissement: Figeac
- Canton: Cère et Ségala
- Intercommunality: Causses et Vallée de la Dordogne

Government
  - Mayor (2020–2026): Michel Moulin
- Area^{1}: 7.98 km^{2} (3.08 sq mi)
- Elevation: 173 m (568 ft)
- Highest elevation: 522 m (1,713 ft)
- Lowest elevation: 139 m (456 ft)
- Population (2023): 296
  - Density: 37.1/km^{2} (96.1/sq mi)
- Time zone: UTC+01:00 (CET)
  - Summer (DST): UTC+02:00 (CEST)
- INSEE/Postal code: 46163 /46130
- ^{1} French Land Register data, which excludes lakes, ponds, glaciers > 1 km^{2} (0.386 sq mi or 247 acres) and river estuaries.

Laval-de-Cère (French pronunciation: [laval də sɛʁ]; Occitan: La Val de Sera) is a commune in the Lot department in south-western France.

== See also ==
- Communes of the Lot department
