= Estal =

- Commune
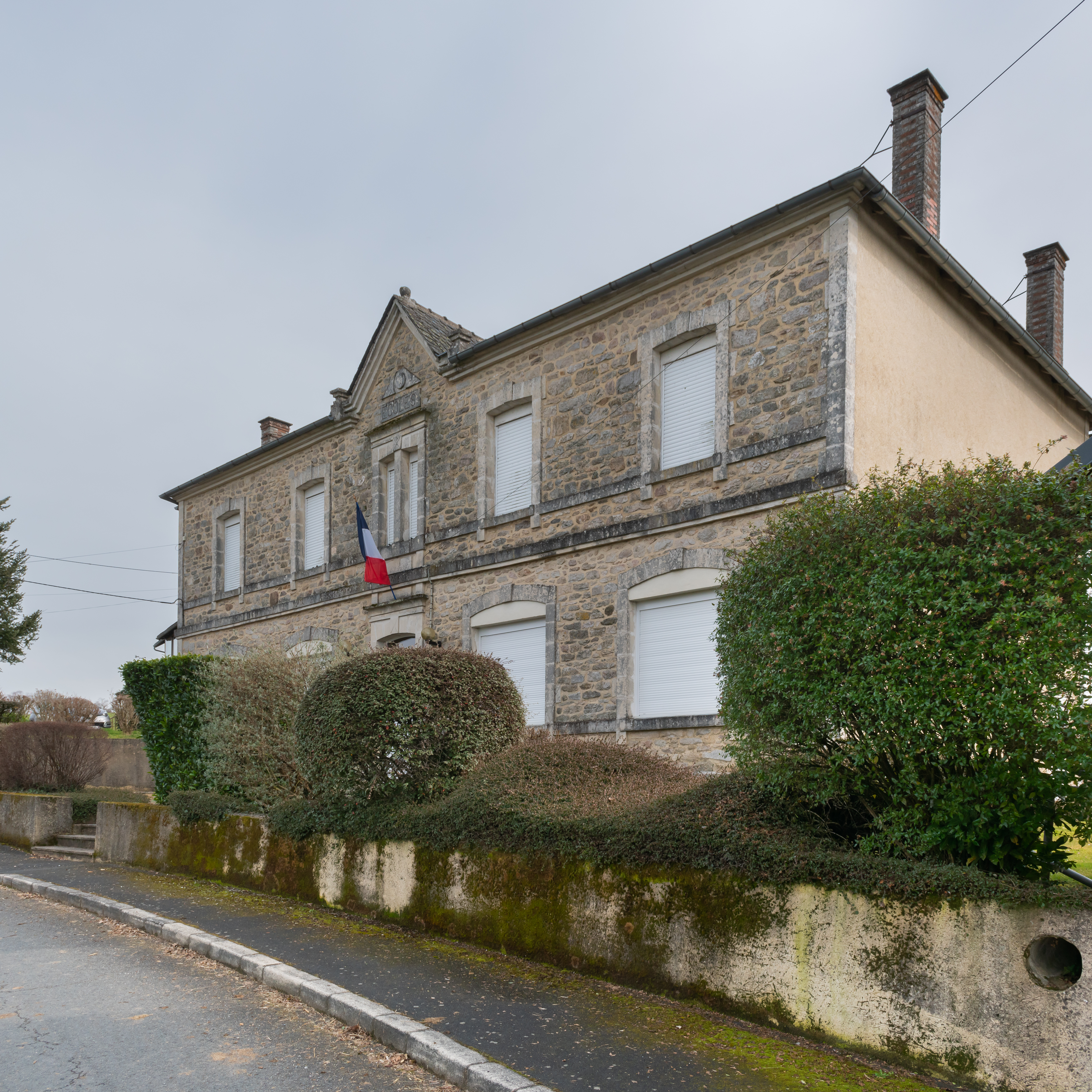
- Town hall of Estal
- Location of Estal
- Location within France Location within Occitanie
- Coordinates: 44°55′10″N 1°55′17″E
- Country: France
- Region: Occitania
- Department: Lot
- Arrondissement: Figeac
- Canton: Cère et Ségala
- Intercommunality: Causses et Vallée de la Dordogne

Government
  - Mayor (2020–2026): Serge Cambon
- Area^{1}: 6.04 km^{2} (2.33 sq mi)
- Elevation: 450 m (1,480 ft)
- Highest elevation: 480 m (1,570 ft)
- Lowest elevation: 193 m (633 ft)
- Population (2023): 97
  - Density: 16/km^{2} (42/sq mi)
- Time zone: UTC+01:00 (CET)
  - Summer (DST): UTC+02:00 (CEST)
- INSEE/Postal code: 46097 /46130
- ^{1} French Land Register data, which excludes lakes, ponds, glaciers > 1 km^{2} (0.386 sq mi or 247 acres) and river estuaries.

Estal (French pronunciation: [ɛstal]) is a commune in the Lot department in south-western France.

== See also ==
- Communes of the Lot department
