= Glanes =

- Commune
- Coat of arms
- Location of Glanes
- Location within France Location within Occitanie
- Coordinates: 44°55′20″N 1°52′48″E
- Country: France
- Region: Occitania
- Department: Lot
- Arrondissement: Figeac
- Canton: Cère et Ségala
- Intercommunality: Causses et Vallée de la Dordogne

Government
  - Mayor (2026–32): Geoffrey Cros
- Area^{1}: 2.72 km^{2} (1.05 sq mi)
- Elevation: 261 m (856 ft)
- Highest elevation: 353 m (1,158 ft)
- Lowest elevation: 148 m (486 ft)
- Population (2023): 292
  - Density: 107/km^{2} (278/sq mi)
- Time zone: UTC+01:00 (CET)
  - Summer (DST): UTC+02:00 (CEST)
- INSEE/Postal code: 46124 /46130
- ^{1} French Land Register data, which excludes lakes, ponds, glaciers > 1 km^{2} (0.386 sq mi or 247 acres) and river estuaries.

Glanes (French pronunciation: [ɡlan]; Occitan: Glanas) is a commune in the Lot department in south-western France.

== Toponymy ==
Attested in the form Glana villa in 893 in the cartulary of Abbey of Beaulieu, Glanes is probably a former property of the Gaul Glennus.

== Local culture and heritage ==
=== Places and monuments ===
- Market hall;
- Église Saint-Laurent - The parish was part of the diocese of Cahors. Current church dates from 1830 and 1867 when it enlarged and remodelled. The romanesque apse could be medieval dating from the 1200s. The building is referenced in the Mérimée database and in the General Inventory of the Occitanie Region;
- Vineyard huts or Caselles;

=== Personalities ===
- Guillaume Andrieu, born in the commune in 1886, missionary in Japan.

== See also ==
- Communes of the Lot department
