= Bonne Maman =

French food brand

- Product type: Jam, marmalade, curd, pastries, yogurt
- Current owner: Andros
- Country: France
- Website: www.bonnemaman.us

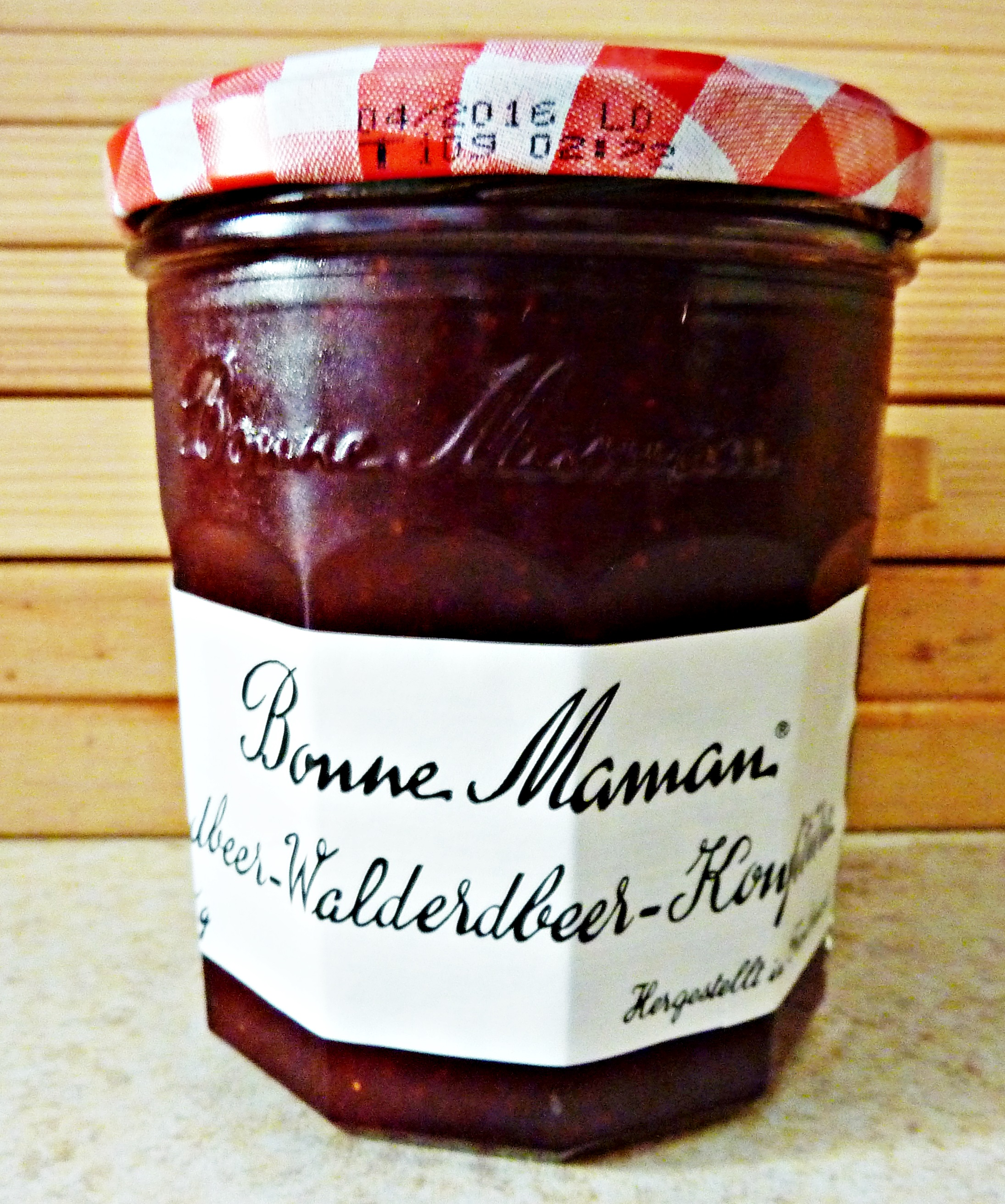
A jar of Bonne Maman mixed-berry jam with German branding

Bonne Maman is a French brand of jam, marmalade, compotes, desserts, cakes and biscuits owned by Andros. It is Andros's leading brand.

The Bonne Maman brand was created by Andros in 1971 as a mass-produced product with a home-made feel: jars feature a handwritten-style label, along with a gingham-patterned ("motif Vichy") lid. Bonne maman, literally 'good mother', is a term of endearment for 'grandmother'.

Andros promotes Bonne Maman jams as being made with "five simple ingredients that could be found in your kitchen" and without high fructose corn syrup, additives, or preservatives.

In February 2021, a story circulated that the brand's owners saved Jews during the Holocaust, but there is no good evidence for this, and the company has declined to comment.
