= Cornac, Lot =

Cornac
- Commune
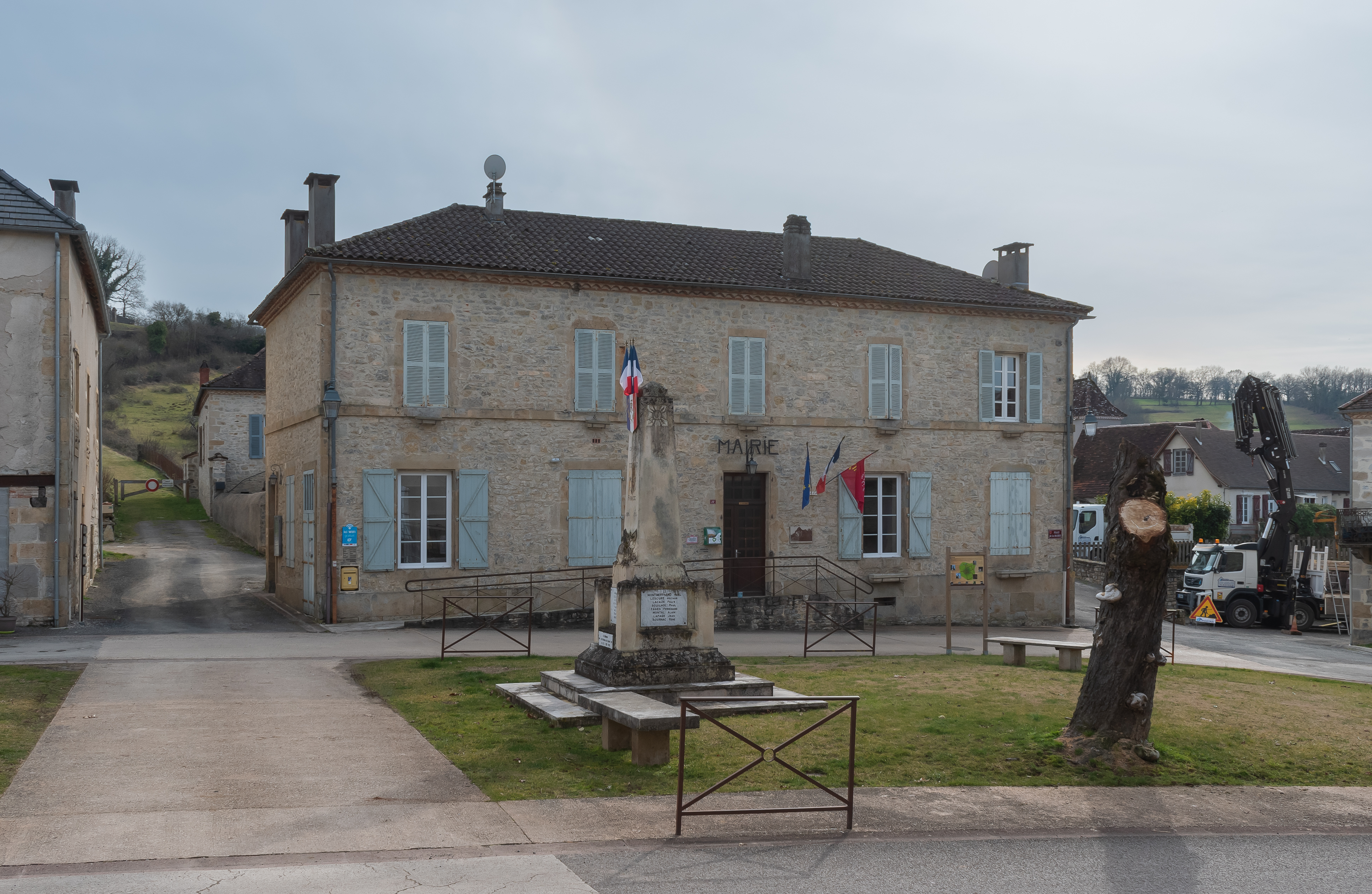
- Town hall of Cornac

- Coat of arms
- Location of Cornac
- Location within France Location within Occitanie
- Coordinates: 44°54′36″N 1°52′54″E
- Country: France
- Region: Occitania
- Department: Lot
- Arrondissement: Figeac
- Canton: Cère et Ségala
- Intercommunality: Causses et Vallée de la Dordogne

Government
  - Mayor (2020–2026): Jean-Pierre Guyot
- Area^{1}: 13.76 km^{2} (5.31 sq mi)
- Elevation: 150 m (490 ft)
- Highest elevation: 528 m (1,732 ft)
- Lowest elevation: 142 m (466 ft)
- Population (2023): 366
  - Density: 26.6/km^{2} (68.9/sq mi)
- Time zone: UTC+01:00 (CET)
  - Summer (DST): UTC+02:00 (CEST)
- INSEE/Postal code: 46076 /46130
- ^{1} French Land Register data, which excludes lakes, ponds, glaciers > 1 km^{2} (0.386 sq mi or 247 acres) and river estuaries.

Cornac (French pronunciation: [kɔʁnak]) is a commune in the Lot department in south-western France.

== Toponymy ==
The toponym Cornac describes the domain of the Gallic Cornos. This names origin could be based on the Indo-European word Cor meaning escarpment and neh Gaulish for height. The ending -ac comes from the Gallic suffix -acon (itself from the common Celtic *-āko-), often Latinized as -acum in texts.

== History ==
The town was part of the lands owned by the barons of Castlenau-Bretenoux. The town originally had a wall and two gates, but these were dismantled in 19th century. The chateau was rebuilt in the 18th century.

== Local culture and heritage ==
=== Places and monuments ===
- Chapel of the White Penitents probably dating from the end of the twelfth century or the beginning of the thirteenth century. The painted decoration was restored in 1994.
- Church Sainte-Geneviève de Cornac. The building is referenced in the Mérimée database and in the General Inventory of the Occitanie Region. Monumental painting is referenced in the Palissy database.

== See also ==
- Communes of the Lot department
