= Buddy Fruits =

American ready-to-eat snack

- Industry: Food
- Founded: 2008; 18 years ago
- Founder: Fabian Milon; Jerome Lesur
- Headquarters: Miami, Florida, United States
- Website: buddyfruits.com

Buddy Fruits is a brand of squeezable fruit pouches sold in the United States. It is headquartered in Miami, Florida. As of the mid-2010s, Buddy Fruits reported offering seven distinct product lines.

== History ==
Buddy Fruits was co-founded in 2008 by Fabian Milon and Jerome Lesur and is manufactured by Ouhlala Gourmet Corp. The company introduced its first product, a pure fruit pouch with five blended fruit flavors, in 2009.

In October 2012, the brand launched the fruit gel in a pouch. In 2017, Buddy Fruits partnered with Crayola on a back‑to‑school promotional campaign.

== Sport endorsement ==
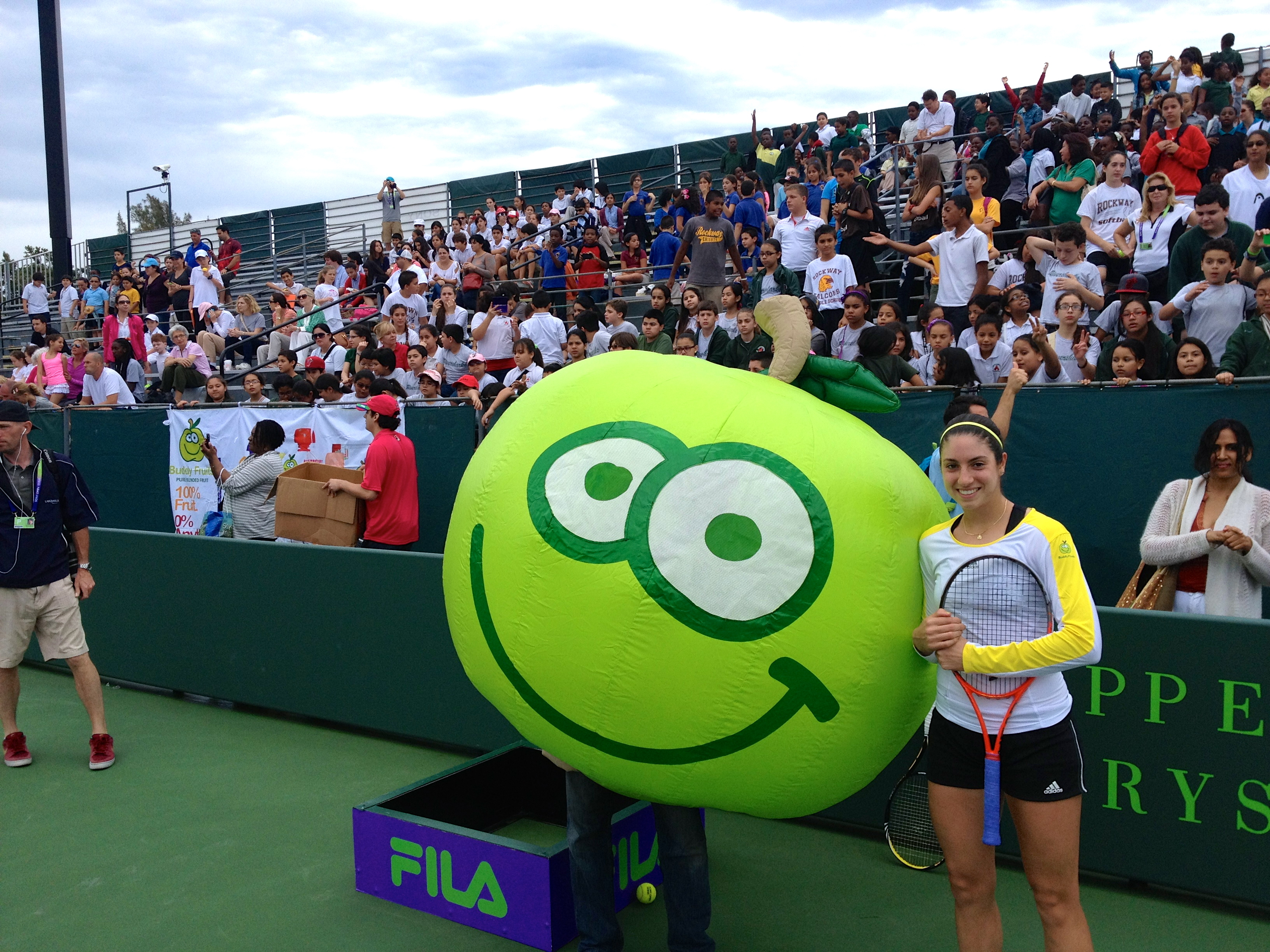
Buddy Fruits in March 2013 at the Sony Open

Buddy Fruits sponsors rising tennis player Christina McHale and double Olympic medalist Dee Dee Trotter.

Buddy Fruits is also involved in its local community and supports the Miami Hurricanes and the Miami Dolphins. Buddy Fruits was the Official Healthy Snack of the 2013 Sony Open Tennis in Miami, Florida.

== See also ==
- List of food companies
