= Gagnac-sur-Cère =

- Commune
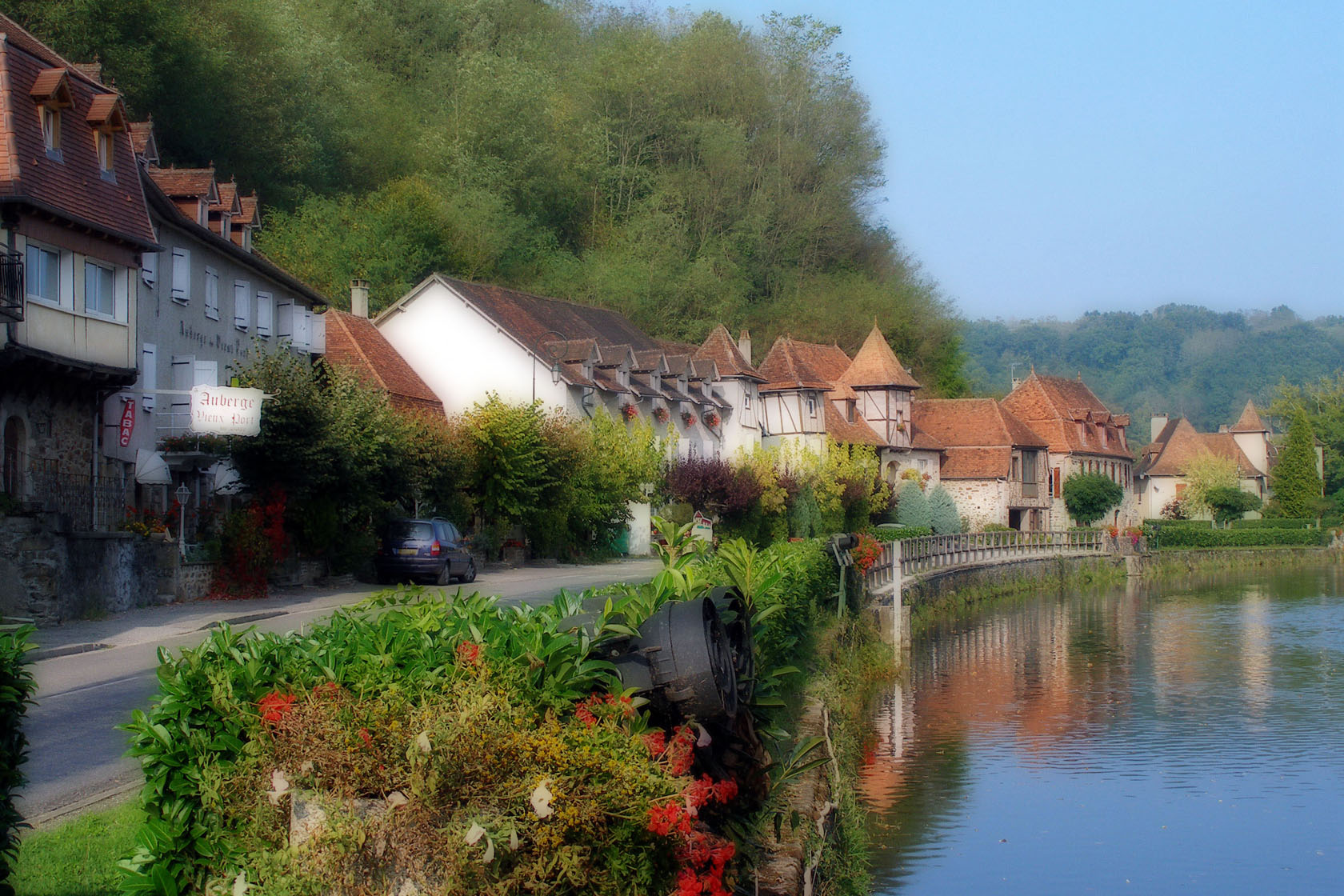
- The village of Gagnac-sur-Cère, in France's Lot region
- Location of Gagnac-sur-Cère
- Location within France Location within Occitanie
- Coordinates: 44°56′23″N 1°52′41″E
- Country: France
- Region: Occitania
- Department: Lot
- Arrondissement: Figeac
- Canton: Cère et Ségala
- Intercommunality: Causses et Vallée de la Dordogne

Government
  - Mayor (2020–2026): Claire Delande
- Area^{1}: 12.83 km^{2} (4.95 sq mi)
- Elevation: 140 m (460 ft)
- Highest elevation: 412 m (1,352 ft)
- Lowest elevation: 138 m (453 ft)
- Population (2023): 650
  - Density: 51/km^{2} (130/sq mi)
- Time zone: UTC+01:00 (CET)
  - Summer (DST): UTC+02:00 (CEST)
- INSEE/Postal code: 46117 /46130
- ^{1} French Land Register data, which excludes lakes, ponds, glaciers > 1 km^{2} (0.386 sq mi or 247 acres) and river estuaries.

Gagnac-sur-Cère (French pronunciation: [ɡaɲak syʁ sɛʁ], literally Gagnac on Cère; Occitan: Ganhac) is a commune in the Lot department in south-western France.

== History ==
During the medieval times, Gagnac was part of the Viscounty of Turenne. But during the Hundred Year's War, the town fell several times to English forces. During the French Wars of Religion, the town was protestant but was taken by Catholic side in 1586 under the Duke of Mayenne.

== Population ==
Historical population
Year	Pop.	±% p.a.
1968	654	—
1975	643	−0.24%
1982	664	+0.46%
1990	611	−1.03%
1999	663	+0.91%
2007	721	+1.05%
2012	702	−0.53%
2017	671	−0.90%
2023	650	−0.53%
Source: INSEE

== See also ==
- Communes of the Lot department
