= Canton of Cère et Ségala =

Coordinates: 44.93°N 1.85°E

The canton of Cère et Ségala is an administrative division of the Lot department, southern France. It was created at the French canton reorganisation which came into effect in March 2015. Its seat is in Biars-sur-Cère.

It consists of the following communes:

1. Belmont-Bretenoux
2. Biars-sur-Cère
3. Bretenoux
4. Cahus
5. Cornac
6. Estal
7. Gagnac-sur-Cère
8. Gintrac
9. Girac
10. Glanes
11. Laval-de-Cère
12. Prudhomat
13. Puybrun
14. Saint-Michel-Loubéjou
15. Sousceyrac-en-Quercy
16. Tauriac
17. Teyssieu
