= Martel, Lot =

Martel
- Commune
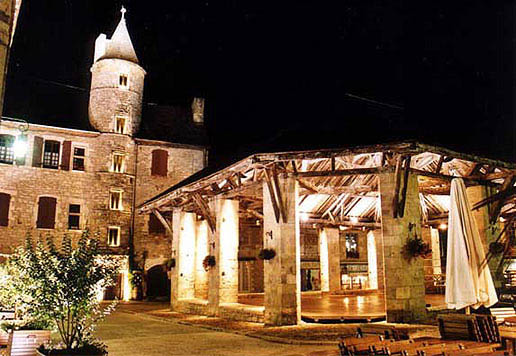
- The covered market in Martel

- Coat of arms
- Location of Martel
- Location within France Location within Occitanie
- Coordinates: 44°56′16″N 1°36′35″E
- Country: France
- Region: Occitania
- Department: Lot
- Arrondissement: Gourdon
- Canton: Martel
- Intercommunality: CC Causses et Vallée de la Dordogne

Government
  - Mayor (2023–2026): Yannick Oubreyrie
- Area^{1}: 35.28 km^{2} (13.62 sq mi)
- Elevation: 240 m (790 ft)
- Highest elevation: 336 m (1,102 ft)
- Lowest elevation: 92 m (302 ft)
- Population (2023): 1,637
  - Density: 46.40/km^{2} (120.2/sq mi)
- Time zone: UTC+01:00 (CET)
  - Summer (DST): UTC+02:00 (CEST)
- INSEE/Postal code: 46185 /46600
- ^{1} French Land Register data, which excludes lakes, ponds, glaciers > 1 km^{2} (0.386 sq mi or 247 acres) and river estuaries.

Martel is a commune in the Lot department in southwestern France. It is a small medieval town in a region well known for its walnuts and truffles. It is a member of Les Plus Beaux Villages de France (The Most Beautiful Villages of France) Association.

== History ==
The town's name means "hammer", and three of these are to be seen on the town's coat of arms. Charles Martel, who earned the nickname "hammer" after his victory in the Battle of Tours in 732, is said to have founded the town. It is more likely to have been established as an urban centre by Rodulphe, first Viscount of Turenne, without a castle or abbey. Henry the Young King died there in 1183. He had sought refuge there after revolting against his father, Henry II of England, and ransacking local monasteries including Rocamadour. He died after confessing his sins, on a bed of hot ashes and a heavy crucifix on his chest.

In 1219, the town received its charter from Raymond IV as a fiefdom of the Viscounts of Turenne. It was exempt from paying taxes to the king of France and issued its own coin. In 1247 Raymond VI, Viscount of Turenne, granted the town the right to appoint four consuls, elected by the towns's people for a period of three years.

With the outbreak of the Hundred Years' War, and the region's status, as either French or English territory having not been clearly established by the Treaty of Paris (1259) and the Treaty of Amiens (1279), the town had to protect itself during the former and was besieged and held out against the English in 1356. It came under English control via the Treaty of Brétigny of 1360 and returned to the French side on 27 August 1374 when it was retaken by Bertrand du Guesclin.

During the French Wars of Religion, the town remained Catholic despite the Viscount being protestant, but the town and church were sacked in 1562 by the protestants.

On 8 May 1738, the Viscount of Turenne, needing money to pay off debts, sold the viscountcy to Louis XV, and Martel and its inhabitants now had to pay their taxes to the king and lost all other privileges it had been given by the viscountcy.

== Geography ==
Martel is located about 15 km (9 mi) east of Souillac and 15 km (9 mi) north of the River Dordogne. To the north lies the commune of Cazillac, to the northeast Strenquels, to the east Saint-Denis-lès-Martel, to the southeast Floirac, to the south Montvalent, to the southwest Creysse, to the west Baladou and to the northwest Cuzance.

The countryside is rural with rolling hills, pastureland and the cultivation of walnuts. North of the town lies the elevated limestone plateau of Causse de Martel, much of which is covered with oak and beech woodland.

== The town ==
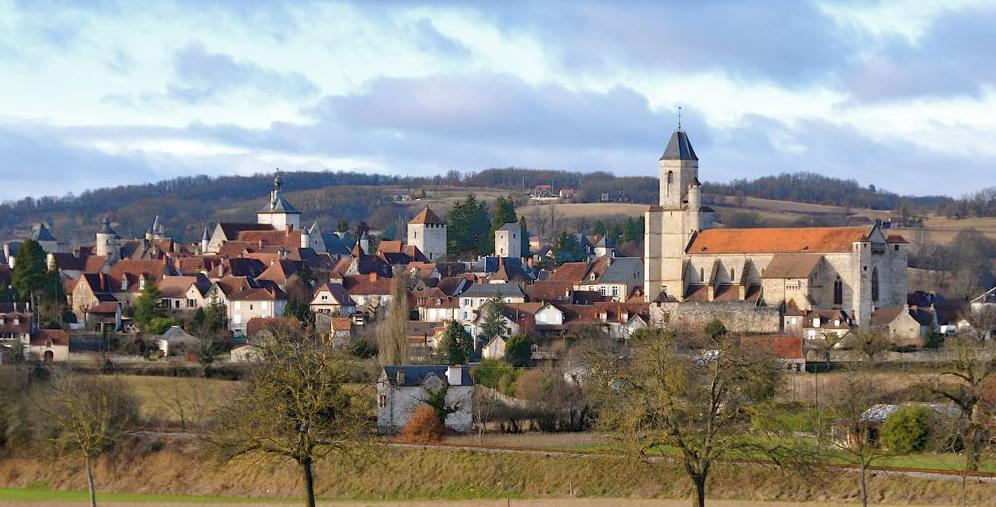
Martel, view with seven towers

Martel is a medieval town, with the older houses built of pale stone that contrasts with their reddish-brown roofs. The ramparts that used to surround the town are gone but in their place is a wide boulevard and the narrow-streeted central part is a pedestrian area. The town has a distinctive sky-line with medieval towers projecting above the houses, and because of these, the town is sometimes called La ville aux sept tours. The highest tower is that of the Church of Saint-Maur.

There is an eighteenth-century market hall taking up most of the central cobbled square. Markets are held here on Wednesdays and Saturdays, and during late December or January there is an annual truffle market.

In July, the Foire à la Laine (Wool Fair) is held underneath the market hall, with competitions for the best fleeces. There is a museum containing items from Puy d'Issolud, a local Gallic archaeological site which has been identified as Uxellodunum, besieged by Julius Caesar in 51 BC.

== Notable buildings and places ==
=== Église St-Maur ===
It is a fortified church. Its tympanum is romanesque and dates from the 1100s. The nave in the church dates from the 1300s while the bell tower dates from 1500s as does the stained glass window depicting the Holy Week.

=== Fossé des Cordeliera and Boulevard du Capitani ===
These are the location's of the old ramparts and moats from the 1100s and 1200s.

=== Halle ===
It is situated in the Place des Consuls contains an covered market. This market hall replaces an old medieval market destroyed in 1793 and was rebuilt between that date and 1800.

=== Hôtel Fabri ===
The current Hôtel Fabri was said to have been built around 1500. It is a two-storey building and has a few old half-windows with stone transoms that may be from an earlier building and are dated around the first half of 1200s. The tower itself dates from first half of 1500s. The other windows in the Hôtel Fabri date from the 1700s. The current building sits on the site of an older building which is said to be where Henry the Young King died in 1183. The tower consists of five floors with a spiral staircase. It has thin pilasters of Ionic and Corinthian capitals that frame the windows sides and with a triangular pediment atop. The house and tower with its staircase became a historical monument on 26 November 1990.

=== Hôtel de Mirandol ===
Is a 15th-century house with a square tower. It was built for the Mirandol's family at the end of the 1400s and beginning of the 1500s. It was built on or incorporated parts of buildings from 1200 and 1300s. The building was restored from 1959 to 1972. The square tower is circular on the inside with ribbed vault. The top level is accessed via a corbelled turret on the towers side.

=== Hotel de la Monnaie ===
Situated on Rue Tournemire, it is located on the site of an old mint from 1200s. The current house is possibly from the 1500s. In 1757 the house was owned by Judicis, a merchant family from Martel. It is two storey build of rubble limestone and slate tiled roof. It has two half-windows and a corbelled towered stairway to a turret.

=== Hôtel de la Raymondie ===
Built around 1280 for the Turenne's, convereted to a home in the 1300s for the Valon family. Became the town hall (Hotel de Ville) after the French Revolution. The building was completed around 1330. It has a pentagonal shape with an inner courtyard equipped and well, watchtowers on corners and a barlongue tower over the main entrance door. Hôtel de la Raymondie became a national monument on 16 October 1906 while the street and courtyard facades on the Rue de Senlis were classified on 21 October 1926. Parts on the Place du Marché and on the Rue Tournemire were registered 9 December 1926.

=== Maison Grise ===
Situated on Rue Tournemire it has a 16th-century bust and shield with three hammers. House is said to date from 1200s but has been modified and added too since with probably only the blocked arched entrance way originating from that early time period. It was, over the centuries, the home of the Judicis family.

=== Rue Droite ===
Old houses including Hôtel Vergnes-de-Ferron.

=== Tour Tournemire ===
Site of the old prison. The first written mention of the tower is in 1352 when its described as a watchtower and prison. It was named after the Tournemire's family from the same time as its written mention. In 1748 the tower was the possession of the Viscount of Turenne and sold to the Duke of Noailles and included the châtelain of Martel. It formed part of the town wall, square in shape, 7.70m wide and 25m high with four levels and at the top a crenelated attic battlement with a tiled pavilion roof. The first floor has a wooden floor, the second is vaulted with a fireplace and the third floor has the remains of a bretèche. Flights of stairs to each floor were built from the sides of the walls.

== Notable people ==
- Claudius Cayx-Dumas (1724–1792), French Jesuit.
- Jean Pierre Serrier (1934–1989), French artist, opened the gallery La Licorne in 1967.

== See also ==
- Communes of the Lot department
