= Saint-Denis-lès-Martel =

- Commune
- Coat of arms
- Location of Saint-Denis-lès-Martel
- Location within France Location within Occitanie
- Coordinates: 44°56′30″N 1°39′45″E
- Country: France
- Region: Occitania
- Department: Lot
- Arrondissement: Gourdon
- Canton: Martel

Government
  - Mayor (2020–2026): Guy Mispoulet
- Area^{1}: 7.93 km^{2} (3.06 sq mi)
- Elevation: 120 m (390 ft)
- Highest elevation: 323 m (1,060 ft)
- Lowest elevation: 93 m (305 ft)
- Population (2023): 333
  - Density: 42.0/km^{2} (109/sq mi)
- Time zone: UTC+01:00 (CET)
  - Summer (DST): UTC+02:00 (CEST)
- INSEE/Postal code: 46265 /46600
- ^{1} French Land Register data, which excludes lakes, ponds, glaciers > 1 km^{2} (0.386 sq mi or 247 acres) and river estuaries.

Saint-Denis-lès-Martel (French pronunciation: [sɛ̃ dəni lɛ maʁtɛl], literally Saint-Denis near Martel; Languedocien: Sent Daunís de Martèl) is a commune in the Lot department in south-western France.

== Geography ==
The commune of Saint-Denis-lès-Martel is located in Quercy, in the Causse de Martel. It is watered by two tributaries of the Dordogne, the Sourdoire which borders the communal territory to the southeast, and the Tourmente. Saint-Denis-près-Martel station has rail connections to Brive-la-Gaillarde, Aurillac, Figeac and Rodez.

=== Neighbouring municipalities ===
Saint-Denis-lès-Martel is adjacent to five other communes.

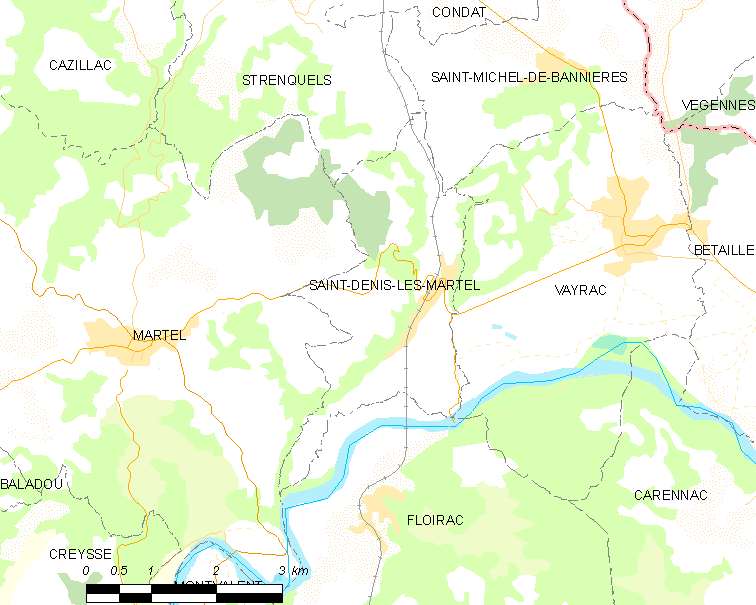
Map of the commune of Saint-Denis-lès-Martel and surrounding municipalities.

== Toponymy ==
The toponym Saint-Denis-lès-Martel, in Occitan Sent Daunís, is based on the Christian Hagiotoponyme, Denis de Paris (Dionysius): first Bishop of Paris. Lès comes from Lez, a preposition from the late Latin latus meaning next to.

Sent Daunís was called first Lenzac variant of Lanzac.

During the French Revolution, the commune, then simply named Saint-Denis, bears the name of Seu-Denis. The appendix lès-Martel was added to the name of the municipality in 1890.

Its inhabitants are called the Saint-Dyonésiens.

== History ==
It is in the present territory of Saint-Denis-lès-Martel, on the slopes of the Puy d'Issolud, formerly Uxellodunum, the last battle for the conquest of Gaul by Julius Caesar occurred during the summer of 51 B.C. after the shocks of Gergovia and Alésia in 52 B.C.. This ultimate victory in the land of the Cadurques, that marked the beginning of the Roman occupation of all Gaul, was acquired by a ruse of Caesar who besieged the Gauls of the Uxellodunum oppidum with his legionaries and dug underground galleries that deprived the occupants of their main water supply (the current fountain of Loulié).

On April 26, 2001, the work of the team of the archaeologist J.P. Girault was officially recognised by the Ministry of Culture in Toulouse, identifying Uxellodunum with the puy d'Issolud located in the Lot on the right bank of the Dordogne river in the commune of Vayrac and partly in that of Saint-Denis-lès-Martel, source of the Fountain of Loulié, place of the siege and the capture of the source by the Romans.

== Local culture and heritage ==
=== Places and monuments ===
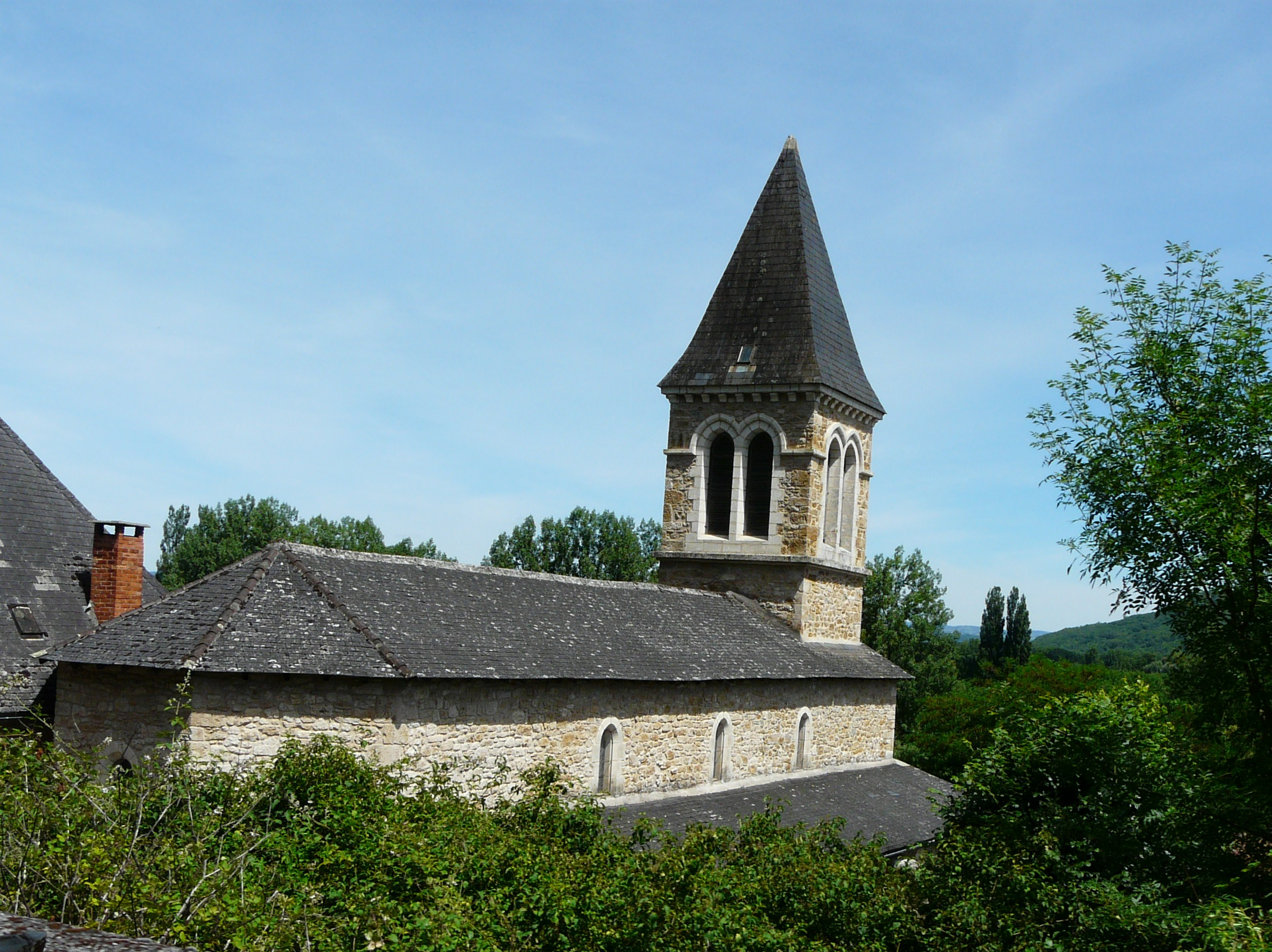
Church.

- Church.
- Archaeological Site of the fountain of l'Oulié, registered on 29 November 2010 under the title of Historic Monument.
- The railway station is called Saint-Denis-près-Martel.
- The Eiffel bridge connecting Saint-Denis-près-Martel to Capdenac and Rodez by train.

== See also ==
- Communes of the Lot department
