= Raphaël Daubet =

French politician (born 1977)

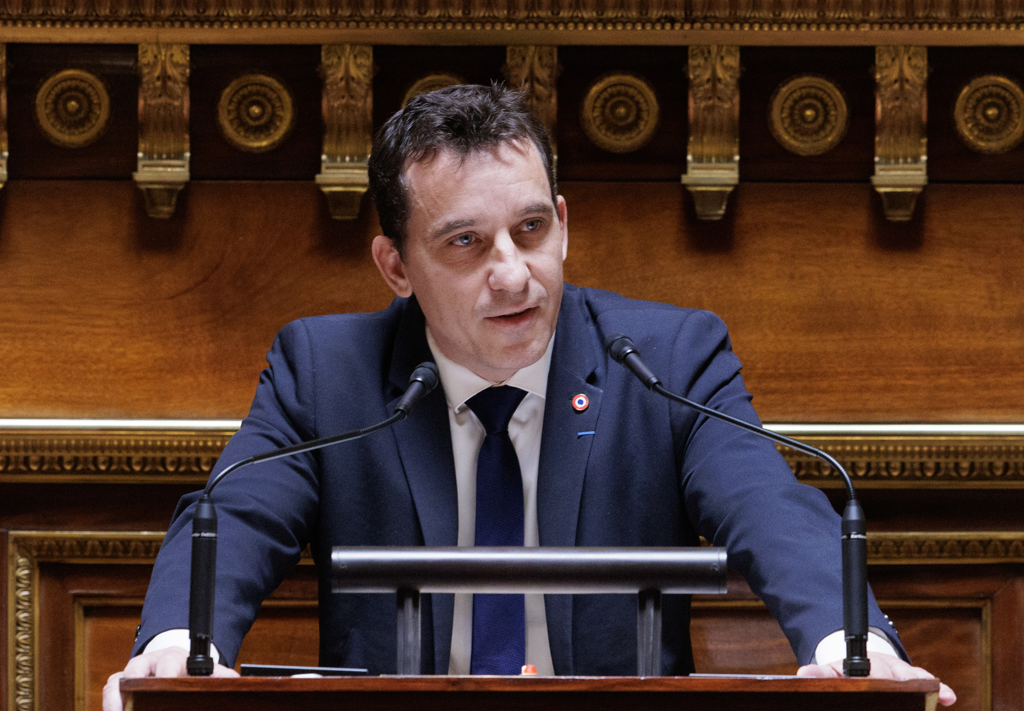
- Daubet in 2023

Senator for Lot
- Incumbent
- Assumed office 2 October 2023

Personal details
- Born: Raphaël Frédéric Daubet; 17 January 1977 (age 49) Périgueux, France
- Party: Radical Party
- Occupation: Dentist; Writer; Politician

Raphaël Frédéric Daubet (French pronunciation: [ʁafaɛl dobɛ]; born 17 January 1977) is a French politician who has represented Lot in the Senate since 2023. A member of the Radical Party, he was previously a member of the Regional Council of Occitania for Lot (2016–2021) and the Departmental Council of Lot for the canton of Martel (2021–2023), and served as mayor of Floirat (2014–2020) and Martel (2020–2023). From 2020 to 2023, Daubet was also president of the communauté de communes Causses et Vallée de la Dordogne.

In 2025 he published Vieux pays, a book on his native Dordogne and Quercy.

== Honours ==
- Knight of the Ordre national du Mérite (2021)
