= Siege of Uxellodunum =

Near-final battle of the Gallic Wars

- Part of the Gallic Wars
Date	51 BC
Location	Uxellodunum, Gaul 44.95°N 1.68°E
Result	Roman victory

Belligerents
Roman Republic	Cadurci; Senones

Commanders and leaders
Julius Caesar; Gaius Caninius Rebilus; Gaius Fabius	Lucterius; Drapes

Strength
4.5 Legions; Unspecified Cavalry	>15,000 Warriors

Casualties and losses
Low	High

The siege of Uxellodunum was one of the last battles of the Gallic Wars. It took place in 51 BC at Uxellodunum. It was the last major military confrontation of the Gallic Wars and marked the pacification of Gaul under Roman rule. The battle resulted in a decisive Roman victory.

== Actions leading up to the siege ==
Lucterius, the chief of the Carduci, and Drapes, chief of the Senones, had retired to the hill fort of Uxellodunum to remain in the relative safety of the fortifications until the governorship of Gaius Julius Caesar ended in Gaul. The group had apparently planned to then begin a new rebellion against their Roman conquerors. Uxellodunum was heavily fortified both by its natural position (a river almost entirely surrounded the hill upon which it was built) and by its impressive fortifications built by the Carduci tribe. Additionally, one side of the fort was protected by a mountainside which prevented any approach from that direction. For these reasons, it was impossible to besiege it in the same manner the Romans had used at the Battle of Alesia a year before.

The Legatus in charge of Uxellodunum, Gaius Caninius Rebilus, conscious that his two legions were anxious to commence an action to repeat the glories Julius Caesar had won at Alesia, divided his legions into three camps in areas around the fort where the terrain was high enough to ensure that any attempt by the Gauls to escape the fort would likely be unsuccessful. By this manner, he planned to effectively seal off the city.

=== Gallic blunders ===
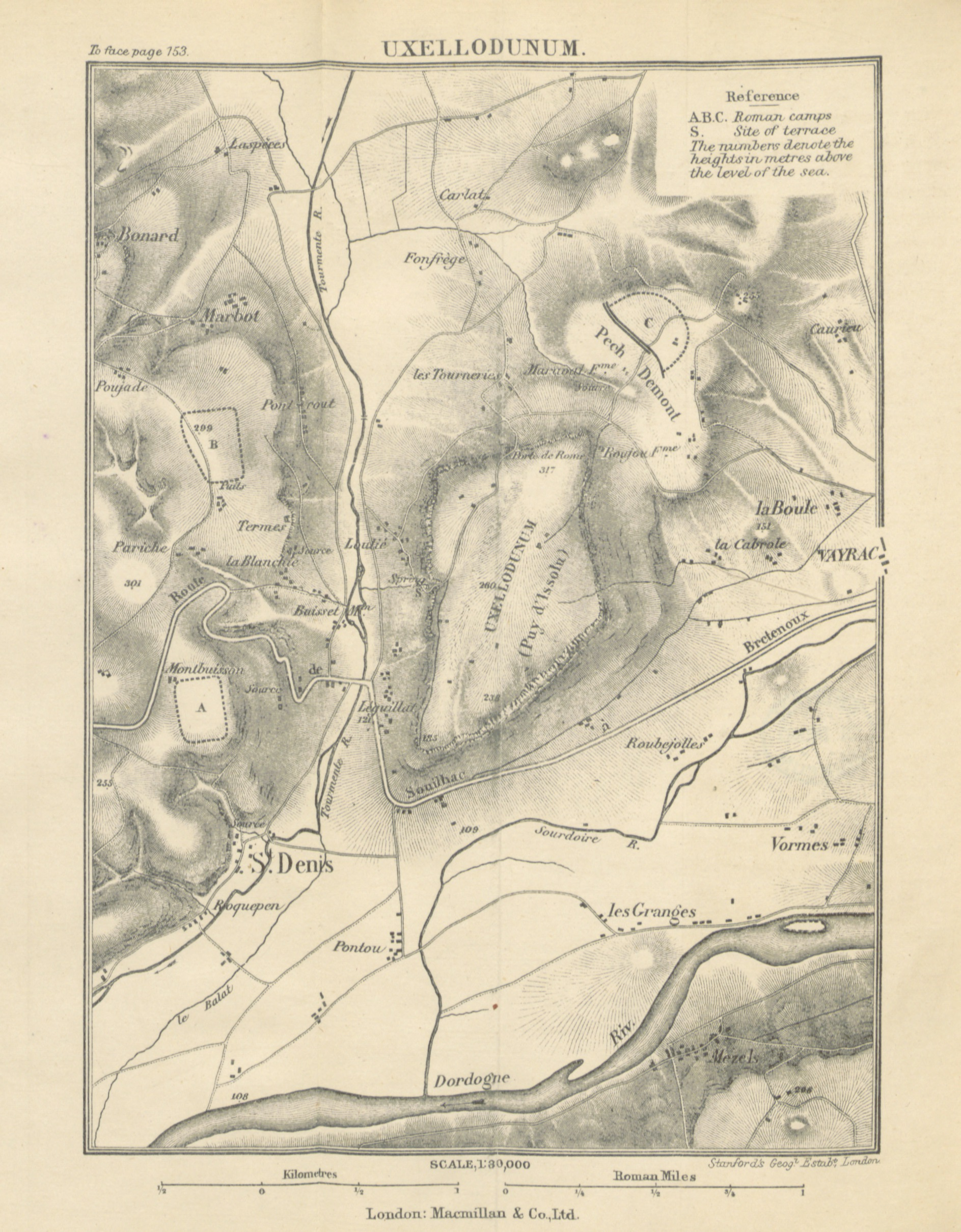
A map of the siege

The Gauls trapped inside the oppidum (Latin for "town" or "city"), having learned the lessons of starvation from the disaster at the Siege of Alesia (where Lucterius had been present), made plans to leave the settlement by night to forage for food and provisions. Climbing over the ramparts, Lucterius and Drapes left a garrison of around 2,000 men inside Uxellodunum, taking the remainder of their force to forage en masse. Some of the local Carduci Gauls in the surrounding areas freely gave the rebels supplies, but much of the provisions were taken by force. The Gauls then tried to again sneak past the Roman sentries set by Caninius Rebilus, but were spotted. Caninius Rebilus, upon learning of the Gauls' plans, concentrated the bulk of his legions and unleashed them on the Gaulish convoy. Lucterius, who was in charge of the convoy, immediately took flight with his war-bands without informing Drapes. The rest of the Gauls were massacred almost to a man, some sources saying that as many as 12,000 Gauls were killed in the action.

Caninius Rebilus left one of his legions behind to defend his three camps and gathered the rest of his soldiers to pursue Drapes. He destroyed the remaining Gaulish forces in the area under Drapes (Lucterius having already fled), capturing Drapes, who was executed shortly thereafter.

Safe in the knowledge that further Gallic reinforcements would not likely be coming to the aid of Uxellodunum due to the blunders of Lucterius and Drapes, Gaius Caninius Rebilus intensified his siege works around Uxellodunum. Shortly after, Gaius Fabius, another of Caesar's legates in Gaul who had been tasked with subduing the Senones, arrived fresh from his victory at the Battle of the Loire with a full 25 cohorts of legions (roughly two and a half legions). These reinforcements put the Roman forces at four and a half legions, enough to construct competent siege works and completely encircle the fort.

== Arrival of Gaius Julius Caesar and the cutting of the water supply ==
While these actions had been ongoing, Gaius Julius Caesar was in the territory of the Belgae in Gaul. There he was informed by courier of the revolt of the Carduci and Senones. Determined to ensure that there would be no more rebellions in Gaul after the expiration of his tenure as governor, Caesar set out immediately for Uxellodunum with his cavalry, leaving behind his legions, even though his two legates had the situation under control. Indeed, Caesar made his way so quickly to Uxellodunum that he surprised his two legates.

Caesar decided that the city could not be carried by force. This was a problem for the Romans because they had also been told by deserters that the city had an abundant food supply, despite the previous blunders of Lucterius and Drapes. Caesar decided therefore to target the city's water supply. The terrain of the fort was such that it would be impossible to divert the river anywhere near Uxellodunum, as the water flowed almost directly from the mountain down into the valley, making digging diversion canals infeasible. Caesar, however, noticed the difficulty the Gauls had collecting the water, having to come down a very steep slope to reach the riverbank. Exploiting this potential flaw in the defences, Caesar stationed archers and ballista near the river to cover any attempt to gather water from this main source.

More troublesome for Caesar however, a secondary water source flowed down from the mountain directly underneath the walls of the fort. It seemed to be almost impossible to block access to this second source. The terrain was extremely rugged and it would not have been feasible to take the ground by force. Before long, Caesar was informed of the location of the source of the spring. With this knowledge, he ordered his engineers to build a ramp of earth and rock that could support a ten-story siege tower, which he used to bombard the spring source. Concurrently, he had another group of engineers build a tunnel system that finished at the source of the same spring.

== Battle ==
The Gauls, falling for the diversion of the tower, attacked it immediately, setting it on fire and keeping it under a constant barrage of missiles to prevent the Romans from extinguishing the fire. Caesar then sent a diversionary attack up the ramp, the narrowness of the works ensuring a bloody confrontation. After a good deal of fighting on the ramp, Caesar ordered his legions in positions surrounding the city to take up a war shout, fooling the Gauls into believing a direct assault on the walls was forthcoming. The Gauls were obliged to retire from their attacks and to man the walls.

Shortly thereafter, the sappers tunnelled through to the water source and finished the job of cutting the Gauls off from their water sources, forcing the Gauls to surrender their unfavourable position.

== Aftermath and reprisals ==
Caesar accepted the Gallic surrender. However he decided to ensure that this would mark the last Gallic rebellion by setting a severe example. He decided against executing or selling the survivors into slavery, as had been customary in contemporary battles. Instead, he had the hands of all the surviving men of military age cut off, but left them alive. He then dispersed the vanquished Gauls throughout the province for all to see that they would never again be able to take up arms against him or the Roman Republic.

After dealing with the Gaulish rebels, Caesar took two of the legions and marched with a view to spend the summer in Aquitania which he had previously not visited. He briefly passed through the city of Narbo Martius in the Roman province of Gallia Narbonensis and marched through Nementocenna. Deeming Gaul sufficiently pacified, as no further rebellions arose, Caesar took the 13th Legion and marched to Italy, where he proceeded to cross the Rubicon and start the Great Roman Civil War on 17 December 50 BC.

== Caesar's descriptions of the siege in his Commentaries ==
=== Commentaries, Book 8 ===
Having arrived at Uxellodunum, contrary to the general expectation, and perceiving that the town was surrounded by the works, and that the enemy had no possible means of retiring from the assault, and being likewise informed by the deserters that the townsmen had abundance of corn, he endeavoured to prevent their getting water. A river divided the valley below, which almost surrounded the steep craggy mountain on which Uxellodunum was built. The nature of the ground prevented his turning the current: for it ran so low down at the foot of the mountain, that no drains could be sunk deep enough to draw it off in any direction. But the descent to it was so difficult, that if we made opposition, the besieged could neither come to the river nor retire up the precipice without hazard of their lives. Caesar perceiving the difficulty, disposed archers and slingers, and in some places, opposite to the easiest descents, placed engines, and attempted to hinder the townsmen from getting water at the river, which obliged them afterward to go all to one place to procure water.

— Chapter 40, (Latin) p. 221 Book VIII

== See also ==
- Gaius Julius Caesar
- Gallic Wars
- Uxellodunum
- Lucterius
- Roman Legion

== Bibliography ==
=== Classic sources ===
- The Complete Works of Gaius Julius Caesar in Latin, Italian and English
- Aulus Hirtius, De bello Gallico 8, 32–44.

=== Modern sources ===
- "Website of Uxeloduno" (in French). Archived from the original on 2002-07-22.
- Labrousse, M. (1976). "Uxellodunum (Saint-Denis-lès-Martel and Vayrac) Lot, France". The Princeton Encyclopedia of Classical Sites. Princeton: Princeton University Press.
- Itard, Eloi; Noché, André (1993). Face à César, Le dernier bastion gaulois (A-t-on retrouvé Uxellodunum ?) (in French).
- Girault, J. P. (1998). "Fouilles archéologiques au Puy-d'Issolud (Fontaine de Loulié), Bulletin de la Société des Études du Lot" (in French). Archived from the original on 2014-12-26.
- Girault, J. P. (2007). "Recherches à la Fontaine de Loulié (Saint-Denis-les-Martel, Lot). Nouveaux éléments sur la bataille d'Uxellodunum" (PDF). Aquitania, Suppl. 14/1: Les âges du fer dans le sud-ouest de la France (Actes du colloque 20-23 mai 2004) (in French).
- Girault, J. P.; Gasco, Jean (2011). La Fontaine de Loulié au Puy d'Issolud et la vallée de la Dordogne - La fin de l'âge du bronze et le premier âge du fer (in French). ISBN 9782363400215.
- Renoux, G.; Pailler, J. M.; Dabosi, F. (December 2001). "Première étude paléométallurgique des armes en fer du Puy d'Issolud (Lot)" (PDF). La revue de Métallurgie (in French). CIT.
- Rickard, J. (26 March 2009). "Siege of Uxellodunum, Spring-Summer 51 B.C." HistoryofWar.org.
- Uxellodunum le dernier combat, L'Archéologue, 660, 2002, pp. 22–26 (In French)
- Renoux, G.; Pailler, J. M.; Dabosi, F. (2004). "Les armes en fer d'Uxellodunum (Puy d'Issolud, Lot), dernière bataille de César en Gaule: Étude paléométallurgique de pointes de flèche ettrait de catapulte" [The iron weapons of Uxellodunum (Puy d'Issolud, Lot), the Caesars' last fight in Gaul. Paleometallurgical study of the arrow heads and the arrow of catapult]. ArchéoSciences (in French). pp. 141–152. Archived from the original on 2012-09-20.
