= Condat =

Condat is the name or part of the name of several communes in France:

- Condat, Cantal or Condat-en-Feniers, in the Cantal department
- Condat, former name of a commune of the Dordogne department, now called Condat-sur-Vézère
- Condat, former name of a commune of the Jura department, now called Saint-Claude, Jura
- Condat, Lot, in the Lot department
- Condat-en-Combraille, in the Puy-de-Dôme department
- Condat-lès-Montboissier, in the Puy-de-Dôme department
- Condat-sur-Ganaveix, in the Corrèze department
- Condat-sur-Trincou, in the Dordogne department
- Condat-sur-Vézère, in the Dordogne department
- Condat-sur-Vienne, in the Haute-Vienne department

Condat is also a French surname

- Marthe Condat (1886–1939), French physician
