= Cressensac =

Commune in Lot, France

- Part of Cressensac-Sarrazac
- Coat of arms
- Location of Cressensac
- Location within France Location within Occitanie
- Coordinates: 45°01′18″N 1°31′16″E
- Country: France
- Region: Occitania
- Department: Lot
- Arrondissement: Gourdon
- Canton: Martel
- Commune: Cressensac-Sarrazac
- Area^{1}: 23.04 km^{2} (8.90 sq mi)
- Elevation: 219 m (719 ft)
- Highest elevation: 330 m (1,080 ft)
- Lowest elevation: 239 m (784 ft)
- Population (2022): 629
  - Density: 27.3/km^{2} (70.7/sq mi)
- Time zone: UTC+01:00 (CET)
  - Summer (DST): UTC+02:00 (CEST)
- Postal code: 46600
- ^{1} French Land Register data, which excludes lakes, ponds, glaciers > 1 km^{2} (0.386 sq mi or 247 acres) and river estuaries.

Cressensac (French pronunciation: [kʁɛsɑ̃sak]; Languedocien: Cressençac) is a former commune in the Lot department in south-western France. On 1 January 2019, it was merged into the new commune Cressensac-Sarrazac.

== See also ==
- Communes of the Lot department
