= Creysse =

Creysse is the name of 2 communes in France:

- Creysse, in the Dordogne department
- Creysse, in the Lot department
