= Sarrazac =

Sarrazac may refer to:

- Sarrazac, Dordogne, a commune in the Dordogne department, France
- Sarrazac, Lot, a former commune in the Lot department, France
- Jean-Pierre Sarrazac (born 1946), a French playwright, stage director, and teacher
