= Montvalent =

- Commune
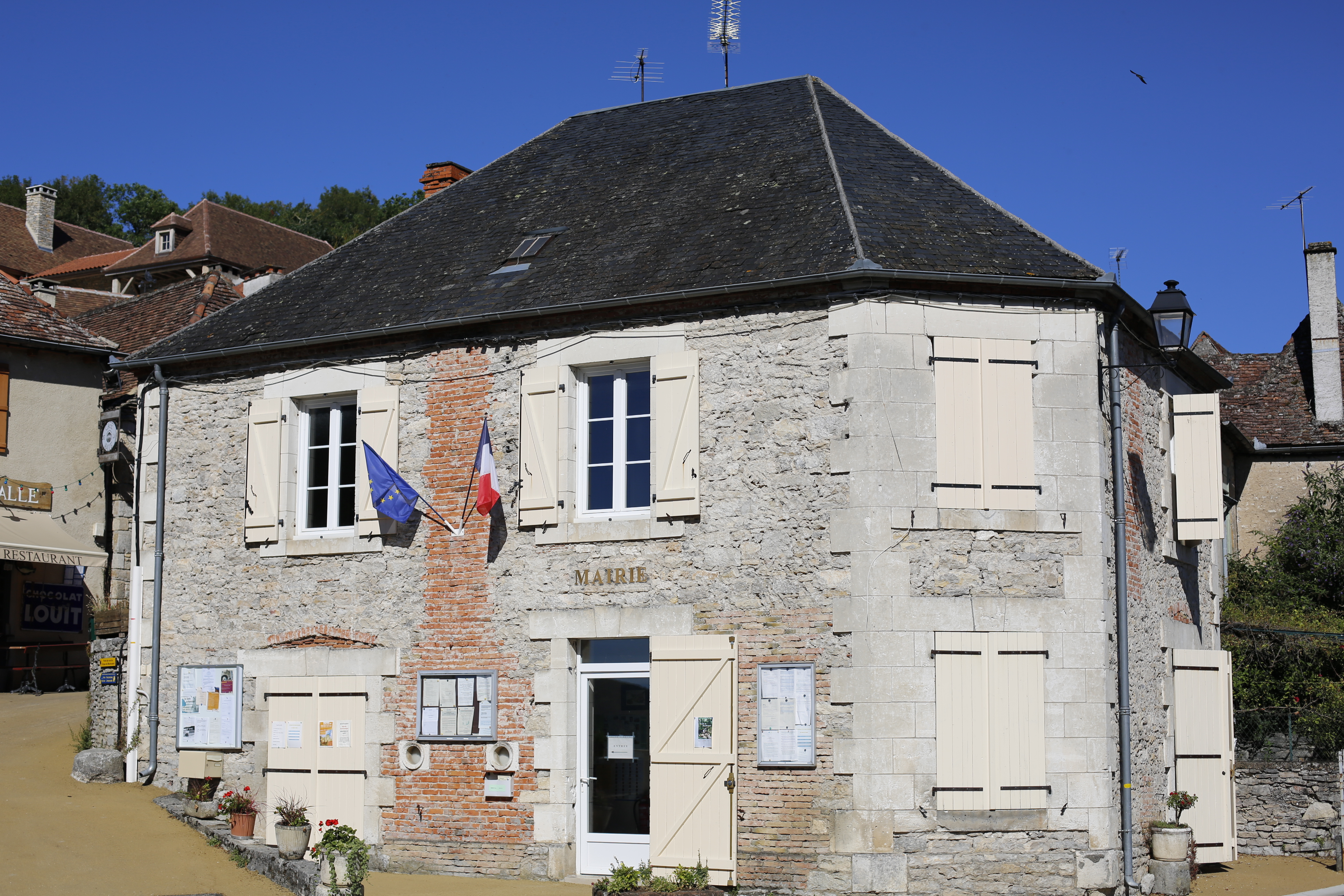
- The town hall in Montvalent
- Location of Montvalent
- Location within France Location within Occitanie
- Coordinates: 44°52′56″N 1°37′09″E
- Country: France
- Region: Occitania
- Department: Lot
- Arrondissement: Gourdon
- Canton: Martel

Government
  - Mayor (2020–2026): Guilhem Cledel
- Area^{1}: 27.61 km^{2} (10.66 sq mi)
- Elevation: 170 m (560 ft)
- Highest elevation: 322 m (1,056 ft)
- Lowest elevation: 95 m (312 ft)
- Population (2023): 314
  - Density: 11.4/km^{2} (29.5/sq mi)
- Time zone: UTC+01:00 (CET)
  - Summer (DST): UTC+02:00 (CEST)
- INSEE/Postal code: 46208 /46600
- ^{1} French Land Register data, which excludes lakes, ponds, glaciers > 1 km^{2} (0.386 sq mi or 247 acres) and river estuaries.

Montvalent is a commune in the Lot department in south-western France.

== Geography ==
Montvalent is located in the north of the Lot. It is situated on the D840 between the towns of Martel and Gramat. The commune is in the valley of the river Dordogne, and is easily reached from the autoroute A20 (Junctions 54, Martel or 55, Souillac).

== Demography ==
The inhabitants of Montvalent are known as Montvalentais in French.

Historical population
Year	Pop.	±% p.a.
1968	212	—
1975	214	+0.13%
1982	197	−1.18%
1990	233	+2.12%
1999	267	+1.52%
2007	302	+1.55%
2012	300	−0.13%
2017	286	−0.95%
2023	314	+1.57%
Source: INSEE

== Places and monuments ==
At the bottom of the cliffs below the village of Montvalent, the underground river from the Gouffre de Padirac resurfaces near the Dordogne.

Montvalent is just 10 minutes by car to the famous pilgrimage site of Rocamadour and pilgrims often stopped in the village on their way.

== See also ==
- Communes of the Lot department
