= Lucterius =

1st century BC Gallic warrior

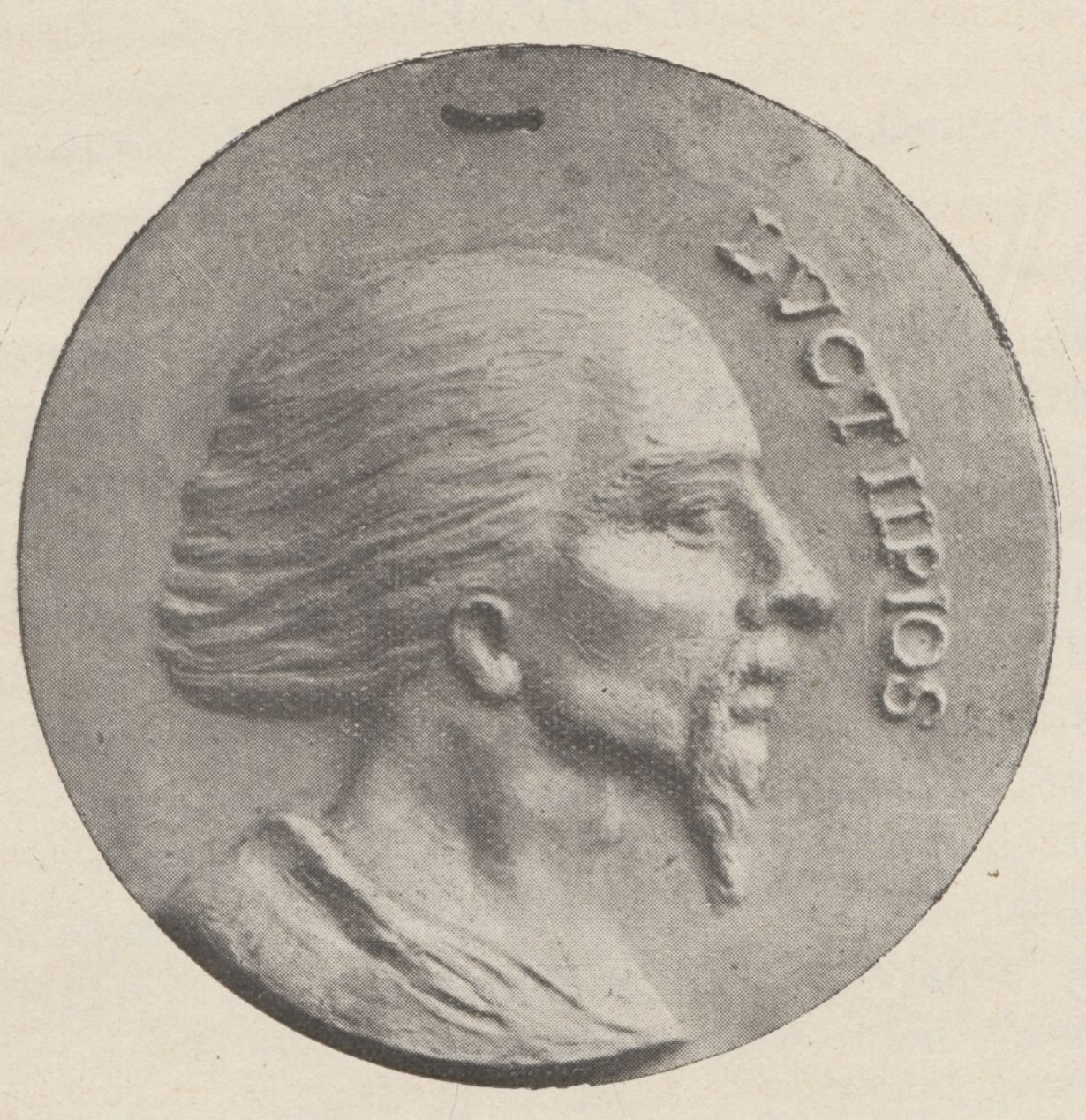
- Idealized portrait of Lucterios (XXth century), from a medal of Sasserna
- Born: c. 1st century BC; Gaul
- Known for: Resisting the Roman conquest of Gaul
- Military career
- Allegiance: Gallic coalition
- Conflicts: Gallic Wars: Siege of Uxellodunum

Lucterius (or Lucterios, ancient Greek: Λυκτεριoς, fl. 52–51 BC) was a leader of the Cadurci, a Celtic people whose territory was located around Cahors in the modern French department of Lot. In the mid-1st century BC, the Cadurci were a client people of the Arverni.

During the Gallic Wars (58–50 BC), Lucterius would participate in the revolt of Vercingetorix in 52 BC and continued to fight even after Vercingetorix was captured by the Romans at the Battle of Alesia. He would ultimately be defeated and captured by the Romans following the Siege of Uxellodunum in 51 BC. In his memoirs, Julius Caesar calls him a man of unsurpassed boldness.

== Gallic War ==
=== Revolt of Vercingetorix ===
During the Gallic rebellion of 52 BC, Vercingetorix placed part of his forces under the command of Lucterius and sent him to secure the allegiance of the Ruteni, a border people. Advancing through the territory of the Nitiobriges and Gabali, he amassed an impressive number of troops and was on the point of invading the Narbonensis, the Roman province of Mediterranean Gaul, when the arrival of Caesar and his army forced him to withdraw.

=== Continued resistance ===
Lucterius remained at large after the surrender of Vercingetorix at Alesia and continued the resistance the following year in an alliance with Drappes, a Senonian under whom motley contingents of Gallic rebels had gathered. They attempted another invasion of the Narbonensis, but were blocked by Gaius Caninius Rebilus. They temporarily withdrew to the oppidum of Uxellodunum, in the French province of "le Quercy" (nowadays commune of Puy-d'Issolud). Mindful of the fate of Vercingetorix under siege at Alesia, they found it imprudent to remain within walls, and encamped about 10 miles away. For a time they were able to keep the town provisioned with grain despite the Roman presence.

Despite the capture of Vercingetorix, Lucterius's continued rebellion and guerrilla warfare in Gaul, coupled with the political situation in Rome, had put increasing pressure on Caesar as he neared the end of his legal term as proconsul. The Gallic leaders hoped to earn time with a siege, until Caesar would be called back to Rome. Thus, Caesar joined the siege with the intention of making Uxellodunum an example of the consequences of resistance. Caesar's strategy to bring the siege to an end was to dig tunnels to hijack the underground flow of the water spring the Gauls used to survive in their oppidum. When the spring dried up, Uxellodunum surrendered. Caesar spared the lives of those who had fought, but had their hands cut off as a visible reminder of the penalty for what he considered betrayal. Caesar calls those who were mutilated improbi, "wicked, faithless, lacking in integrity or trustworthiness"; he characterizes the resistance as if the Gauls were breaking a treaty rather than fighting to retain their independence. Although the Cadurci were not under Roman rule at the beginning of the Gallic Wars, they were clients of the Arverni, who were independent but had a treaty with Rome dating to the defeat of Bituitus in the 120s BC. Lucterius, having fled before the surrender, sought refuge among the Arverni, but was betrayed and turned over to the Romans by the Arverni leader Epasnactos.

=== Imprisonment and fate ===
There is no information about Lucterius following his capture by the Romans. However, it seems that his descendants became part of the new Gallo-Roman aristocracy ruling over Roman Gaul. This belief originates from fragments of two statues discovered in Cadurci territory and in the sanctuary of the Three Gauls of Lugdunum (Lyon), bearing inscriptions mentioning Gallo-Roman officials with "Lucterius" in their tria nomina. They were probably a son and grandson of the rebel leader, which demonstrates the family remained influential after the Roman conquest.
