= Château de la Petite Filolie =

French castle in Condat-sur-Vézère

Coordinates: 45°05′42″N 1°12′50″E

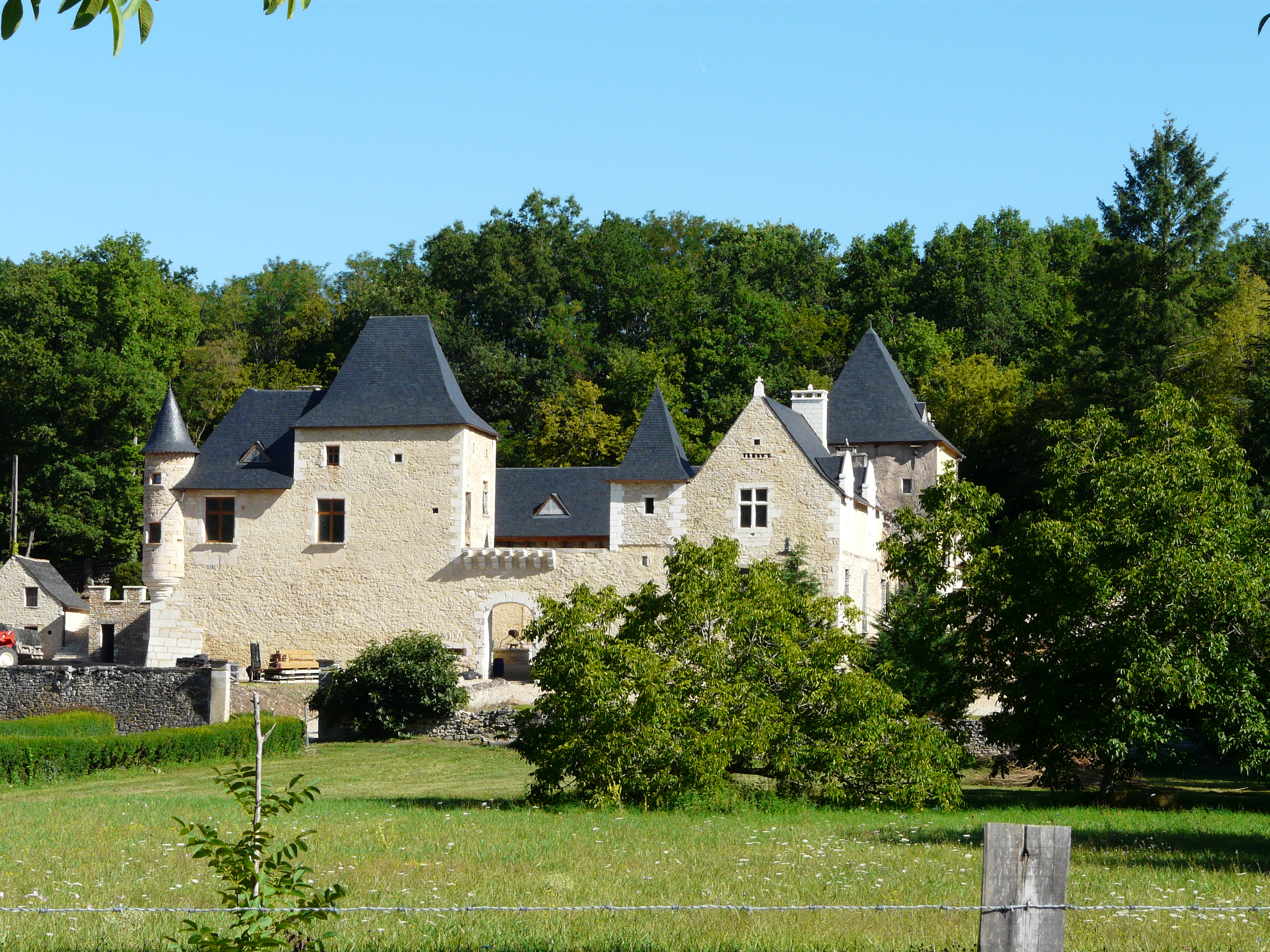

The Château de la Petite Filolie is a château in Condat-sur-Vézère, Dordogne, Nouvelle-Aquitaine, France. It stands on the River Vézère directly opposite the Château de la Fleunie.
