= Sarrazac, Lot =

Sarrazac
- Part of Cressensac-Sarrazac
- Location of Sarrazac
- Location within France Location within Occitanie
- Coordinates: 45°01′03″N 1°35′23″E
- Country: France
- Region: Occitania
- Department: Lot
- Arrondissement: Gourdon
- Canton: Martel
- Commune: Cressensac-Sarrazac
- Area^{1}: 18.38 km^{2} (7.10 sq mi)
- Elevation: 142 m (466 ft)
- Highest elevation: 342 m (1,122 ft)
- Lowest elevation: 132 m (433 ft)
- Population (2022): 525
  - Density: 28.6/km^{2} (74.0/sq mi)
- Time zone: UTC+01:00 (CET)
  - Summer (DST): UTC+02:00 (CEST)
- Postal code: 46600
- ^{1} French Land Register data, which excludes lakes, ponds, glaciers > 1 km^{2} (0.386 sq mi or 247 acres) and river estuaries.

Sarrazac (French pronunciation: [saʁazak]; Languedocien: Sarrasac) is a former commune in the Lot department in south-western France. On 1 January 2019, it was merged into the new commune Cressensac-Sarrazac.

== See also ==
- Communes of the Lot department
