= Divona =

Gaulish name for a sacred spring

Divona (Gaulish: Deuona, Diuona, 'the divine one') is the Celtic name of the sacred spring of Roman Bordeaux (Burdigala), recorded by the 4th-century poet Ausonius, and by extension a Gaulish designation for a divinised spring. The name is formed from the Gaulish word for 'god'. It recurs in place-names, most conspicuously in Divona Cadurcorum, the ancient name of Cahors, and in a number of river-names. Whether it denotes a distinct goddess or serves as a generic title for any deity of the waters is disputed.

== Name ==
The name is preserved by the poet Ausonius, who in his praise of Burdigala salutes the spring of his native city as Divona, a name given "in the language of the Celts", and as a spring "added to the gods".

Divona is a derivative of the Gaulish stem dēuo- ('god', from Proto-Indo-European *deiwos). The variant dīuo- is equally frequent, and it is unsettled whether such spellings are Latinised or reflect a close Gaulish pronunciation of the vowel. The second element is the suffix -onā, which recurs in the goddess-names Damona, Epona, Matrona and Sirona. On this analysis Dēuonā means 'the divine one' or 'the goddess'. (Note: An older interpretation, resting on the gloss onno, rendered 'flumen' ('river'), in Endlicher's Glossary, took -onā as a Gaulish word for 'spring', but the existence of such a word is doubtful and this explanation has been abandoned.)

The same name recurs as a place-name. Ptolemy records a Divona of the Cadurci, later Divona Cadurcorum, which first denoted the spring now called the Fontaine des Chartreux and then the town that became Cahors. Ptolemy also lists a Devona among the Taexali of northern Britain, identified with the Roman fort at Kintore on the Don, and a further Devona in Germania. The modern names of Divonne (Ain) and Dionne (Côte-d'Or) derive from the same form. It is related to, but distinct from, the common Celtic river-name *Dēuā, as in the British Dee, usually read as 'the goddess' or 'the divine one', though Patrizia de Bernardo Stempel has proposed the secular sense 'the shining one'.

== Cult ==
Divona is known above all as the divinised spring of Burdigala (modern Bordeaux). Writing towards the end of the 4th century, Ausonius gave fifteen of the forty-one verses of his poem on the city to it, a proportion that marks its standing. He describes a spring faced with Parian marble, pouring through twelve outlets (ostia) and never failing for the needs of the people, drinkable as a healing draught, and he salutes it as the genius of the city and a spring received among the gods. It supplied the fresh water of the city. The spring can no longer be located, though Claude Bourgeois placed it near the present place Saint-Christoly.

At Cahors the spring later known as the Fontaine des Chartreux gave its name to the settlement of the Cadurci in the same way. That Gaulish springs were treated as holy places is attested elsewhere by votive deposits and by inscriptions, as at the sanctuary of the goddess Sequana at the source of the Seine. In this setting the cult of the waters addressed not the water itself but a deity whose power was held to work through it.

== Interpretation ==
Because Divona means no more than 'the divine one' or 'the goddess', it is uncertain whether it names a particular deity. Ausonius states expressly that the spring bears a Celtic name and receives divine worship. Andreas Hofeneder stresses that the name could in principle be used of any female deity, so that it need not designate an individual goddess. Earlier scholarship, and some reference works, nonetheless treat Divona as a goddess in her own right, and Garrett Olmsted accepts a fragmentary dedication to her at Bordeaux.

Ausonius's phrasing follows a model in Virgil, the address to Hercules in the Aeneid, and turns on a figura etymologica that sets the Celtic Divona at the head of the verse against the Latin divis ('to the gods') at its end, presenting the poet as a learned versifier. His etymology is nonetheless correct. It does not follow that he knew Gaulish, or that the language was still widely spoken in Gaul at the close of the 4th century.

== Epigraphy ==
There is no secure epigraphic evidence for a cult of Divona. A votive inscription from Bordeaux, found in 1865, preserves an incomplete goddess-name, [...]onae. Camille Jullian restored it as [Div]onae, a reading followed by Alfred Holder, Maximilian Ihm and Garrett Olmsted. The fragment can equally be completed as [Bell]onae, [Ep]onae or [Sir]onae, and the worship of Sirona is itself attested at Bordeaux. The dedicant of the inscription was a sevir from Turiaso in Hispania Tarraconensis, not a native of the city.

A second possible witness is an altar from near Bagnols-sur-Cèze, reading Diiona.

A third is a lead tablet from Rauranum (modern Rom) inscribed on both faces and found in 1887, whose language and reading remain disputed. On the interpretation of Wolfgang Meid, a slave asks the goddess Dibona (= Divona) that a girl he loves not be taken from him. It remains unclear who was meant, since any female deity could be addressed by the name.

Text	Find-spot	Divine name(s)	Translation	Reference	Comments
[...]onae M(arcus) Sulpicius Primulus Turiassone(n)sis seviral(is) d(e) s(ua) p(ecunia) f(aciendum) c(uravit) Sulpicius Sacuro f(ilius) Sulpicia Censorina f(ilia) Sulpicia Phoebe l(iberta)	Bordeaux	Uncertain	To the goddess [...]ona, Marcus Sulpicius Primulus of Turiaso, sevir, had this made at his own expense, together with Sulpicius Sacuro his son, Sulpicia Censorina his daughter and Sulpicia Phoebe his freedwoman.	CIL XIII, 586	The theonym is lost. Camille Jullian restored [Div]onae; the fragment is now generally read [Sir]onae, and could also be [Bell]onae or [Ep]onae. The dedicant came from Turiaso in Hispania.
Diiona	Laudun-l'Ardoise (Gard)	Divona (?)	Diiona	CIL XII, 2768	Reading uncertain, taken by some as Divona (or Deona). Also published as ILS 4703a.
… eti cartaont Dibona sosio deui pia …	Rom (Deux-Sèvres)	Divona (?)	Disputed.	RIG II.2, L-103	Opistographic lead tablet in Latin cursive, of the Diocletianic period (late 3rd or early 4th century AD), found in a well at Rauranum in 1887. Both the language, a mixture of late Gaulish and vulgar Latin, and the reading are disputed. The name Dibona (= Divona) appears only on some readings, including that of Wolfgang Meid, who takes the tablet as a love-charm invoking the goddess. The text given here follows Meid; the RIG edition, established by Robert Marichal, gives the passage as scriptio continua.

== See also ==
- Ancient Celtic religion
- List of Celtic deities
