= Château de la Fleunie =

Château in Nouvelle-Aquitaine, France

- Condat-sur-Vézère in France
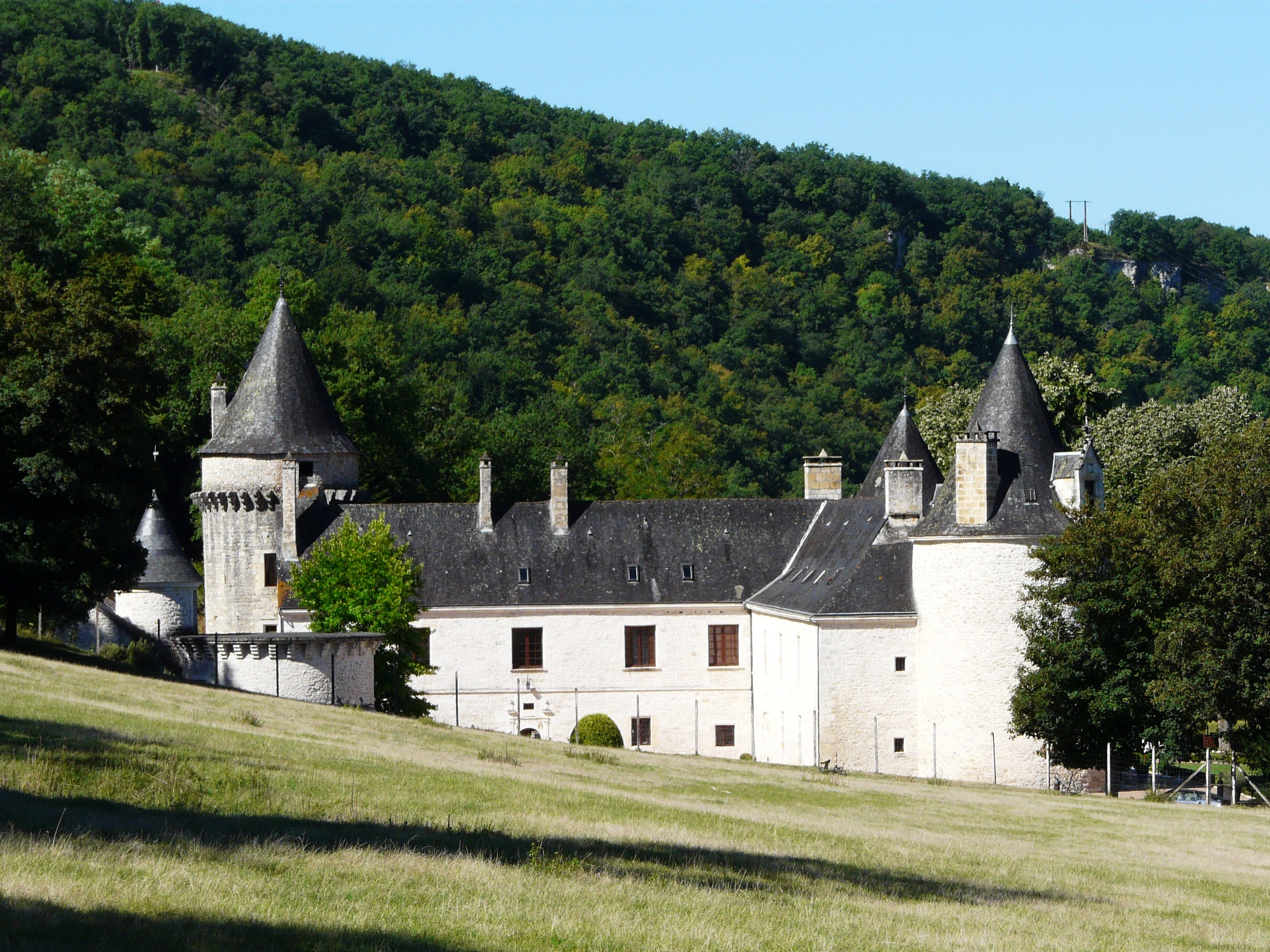

Location
- Coordinates: 45.092639°N 1.222528°E

Site history
- Built: 12th century
- Fate: Turned into a hotel-restaurant

The Château de la Fleunie is a château located south of the commune of Condat-sur-Vézère in Dordogne, Nouvelle-Aquitaine, France.

== History ==
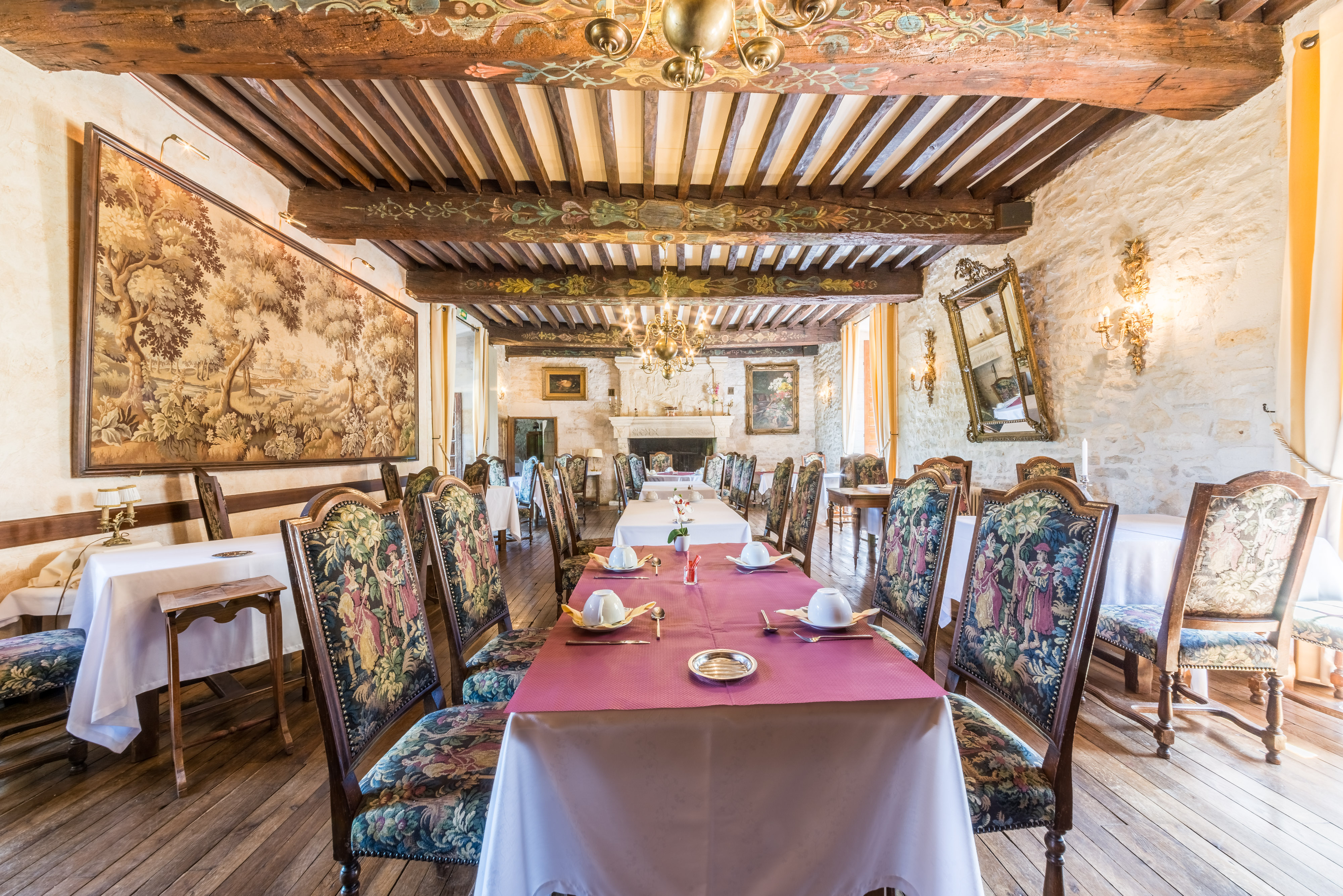
Inside the restaurant

Built in the 12th century on the left bank of the Vézère, the Château de la Fleunie faces the Château de la Petite Filolie on the other bank.

The Château was used by the Knights Hospitallers and the Sovereign Military Order of Malta as a commandery house. After a restoration in 1990, it is today a luxury hotel-restaurant, known as Château La Fleunie.
