= Cavagnac =

- Commune
- Coat of arms
- Location of Cavagnac
- Location within France Location within Occitanie
- Coordinates: 45°00′34″N 1°38′27″E
- Country: France
- Region: Occitania
- Department: Lot
- Arrondissement: Gourdon
- Canton: Martel
- Intercommunality: Causses et Vallée de la Dordogne

Government
  - Mayor (2020–2026): Martine Rodrigues
- Area^{1}: 10.34 km^{2} (3.99 sq mi)
- Elevation: 191 m (627 ft)
- Highest elevation: 256 m (840 ft)
- Lowest elevation: 123 m (404 ft)
- Population (2023): 432
  - Density: 41.8/km^{2} (108/sq mi)
- Time zone: UTC+01:00 (CET)
  - Summer (DST): UTC+02:00 (CEST)
- INSEE/Postal code: 46065 /46110
- ^{1} French Land Register data, which excludes lakes, ponds, glaciers > 1 km^{2} (0.386 sq mi or 247 acres) and river estuaries.

Cavagnac (French pronunciation: [kavaɲak]; Occitan: Cavanhac) is a commune in the Lot department in south-western France.

== See also ==
- Communes of the Lot department
