= Cressensac-Sarrazac =

- Commune
- Coat of arms
- Location of Cressensac-Sarrazac
- Location within France Location within Occitanie
- Coordinates: 45°01′18″N 1°31′16″E
- Country: France
- Region: Occitania
- Department: Lot
- Arrondissement: Gourdon
- Canton: Martel
- Intercommunality: Causses et Vallée de la Dordogne

Government
  - Mayor (2020–2026): Habib Fenni
- Area^{1}: 41.42 km^{2} (15.99 sq mi)
- Highest elevation: 332 m (1,089 ft)
- Lowest elevation: 142 m (466 ft)
- Population (2023): 1,165
  - Density: 28.13/km^{2} (72.85/sq mi)
- Time zone: UTC+01:00 (CET)
  - Summer (DST): UTC+02:00 (CEST)
- INSEE/Postal code: 46083 /46600
- ^{1} French Land Register data, which excludes lakes, ponds, glaciers > 1 km^{2} (0.386 sq mi or 247 acres) and river estuaries.

Cressensac-Sarrazac (French pronunciation: [kʁɛsɑ̃sak saʁazak]; Occitan: Cressençac e Sarrasac) is a commune in the Lot department in south-western France. It was established on 1 January 2019 by merger of the former communes of Cressensac (the seat) and Sarrazac.

== See also ==
- Communes of the Lot department
