= Saint-Michel-de-Bannières =

- Commune
- Location of Saint-Michel-de-Bannières
- Location within France Location within Occitanie
- Coordinates: 44°58′37″N 1°41′23″E
- Country: France
- Region: Occitania
- Department: Lot
- Arrondissement: Gourdon
- Canton: Martel
- Intercommunality: Causses et Vallée de la Dordogne

Government
  - Mayor (2020–2026): Gaëligue Jos
- Area^{1}: 7.74 km^{2} (2.99 sq mi)
- Elevation: 172 m (564 ft)
- Highest elevation: 277 m (909 ft)
- Lowest elevation: 112 m (367 ft)
- Population (2023): 354
  - Density: 45.7/km^{2} (118/sq mi)
- Time zone: UTC+01:00 (CET)
  - Summer (DST): UTC+02:00 (CEST)
- INSEE/Postal code: 46283 /46110
- ^{1} French Land Register data, which excludes lakes, ponds, glaciers > 1 km^{2} (0.386 sq mi or 247 acres) and river estuaries.

Saint-Michel-de-Bannières (French pronunciation: [sɛ̃ miʃɛl də banjɛʁ]; Occitan: Sent Miquèl L'Entendon) is a commune in the Lot department in south-western France. There is a twelfth-century church fortified during the later 15th century. The current mayor is Gaëligue Jos, elected in 2020.

The population was 327 in 2021. 9% of the active population was unemployed in 2020.

== See also ==
- Communes of the Lot department
