= Gaius Caninius Rebilus (consul 45 BC) =

Roman general and statesman

Gaius Caninius Rebilus (fl. 52 – 45 BC) was a Roman general and politician. As a reward for devoted service, Julius Caesar made him suffect consul for mere hours on the last day of December 45 BC.

Rebilus, a novus homo of the late Republic, served with Julius Caesar throughout the Gallic Wars and the civil war. He was military tribune in Gaul in 52 BC, before becoming one of Caesar's legates in 51 BC.

== Gallic wars ==
During the later stages of the Gallic War he commanded two legions on the southern slope of the heights during the siege of Alesia, where Caesar's defences were weakest. With great difficulty, and the timely support of Titus Labienus, he withstood the last major attack on the Roman position there on 2 October 52 BC. The following year he was sent to pursue Cadurci leader Lucterius, who fled to the stronghold of Uxellodunum which Rebilus proceeded to besiege. Attempting to emulate the tactics at Alesia, he was forced to deal with repeated sorties which disrupted his attempts to complete his lines. Eventually Caesar made his way there to take overall command of the siege.

Two years after Alesia, the Andecavi, led by Dumnacus, continued war against Rome and laid siege to Limonum (present-day Poitiers), an oppidum of the Pictones. Gaius Caninius Rebilus led the Roman relief army and forced them to lift the siege and retreat. The army of the Andecavi was pursued by the Romans and suffered heavy casualties. In a decisive battle the following day, the Romans killed some 12,000 men. Dumnacus escaped, and when Armorica surrendered, he went into self-imposed exile.

== Civil war ==
On the outbreak of the civil war in 49 BC, Rebilus accompanied Caesar in his march into Italy and he was sent to Brundisium as an unsuccessful negotiator to Pompey. Later that year, he was sent by Caesar as a legate under Gaius Scribonius Curio in the hope that Rebilus would compensate for Curio's lack of military experience. He pushed Curio to take advantage of a break in the enemy lines to achieve victory at the Battle of Utica, and after the latter's defeat and death, he was one of the few who escaped from Africa. In the following year (48 BC), it is assumed that he was made praetor.

In 46 BC returned to Africa as proconsul with Caesar, under whom he served in the Thapsus campaign, laying siege to Thapsus and accepting the surrender of Gaius Vergilius, the governor of Africa. The next year he accompanied Caesar to Spain as his legate, joining him to fight in the last stand of the Republicans at Munda, after which he occupied the town of Hispalis during the push to drive out the demoralized Republicans.

== Consulship ==
On the last day of December 45 BC, the consul Quintus Fabius Maximus suddenly died and Caesar made Rebilus consul suffectus for the few remaining hours of the year. Cicero poured his scorn on the matter:

- "So in the consulship of Caninius you may take it that nobody had breakfast! However, at any rate no crime was committed during the same period – the consul's vigilance was extraordinary. Throughout his entire term of office he never closed an eye!"
- "Rebilus brought it about that people had to ask themselves, in whose consulship was he consul?"
- "When [Caninius] reproached Cicero for not paying a courtesy call on him as consul, Cicero said, 'I intended to come, but nightfall overtook me'".

== Family ==
His grandfather had once been urban praetor. He had a son, Gaius Caninius Rebilus, who was suffect consul in 12 BC.

== See also ==
- Caninia gens

== Sources ==
- Broughton, Thomas Robert Shannon (1952). The magistrates of the Roman republic. Vol. 2. New York: American Philological Association.
- Gusso, Massimo (January 1997). "A proposito di C.Caninius Rebilus, console in paucas horas il 31 dicembre del 45 a.C." Orpheus, Rivista di Umanità Classica e Cristiana (in Italian). 17 (2): 345–374.
- Holmes, T. Rice, The Roman Republic and the Founder of the Empire, Vol II, Oxford University Press, 1923
- Holmes, T. Rice, The Roman Republic and the Founder of the Empire, Vol III, Oxford University Press, 1923
- Syme, Ronald, The Roman Revolution, Clarendon Press, Oxford, 1939
- Zmeskal, Klaus (2009). Adfinitas (in German). Vol. 1. Passau: Verlag Karl Stutz. ISBN 978-3-88849-304-1.

Political offices
Preceded by Quintus Fabius Maximus	Roman consul 31 December 45 BC; With: Gaius Trebonius	Succeeded by Gaius Julius Caesar; Marcus Antonius
