= Vayrac =

- Commune
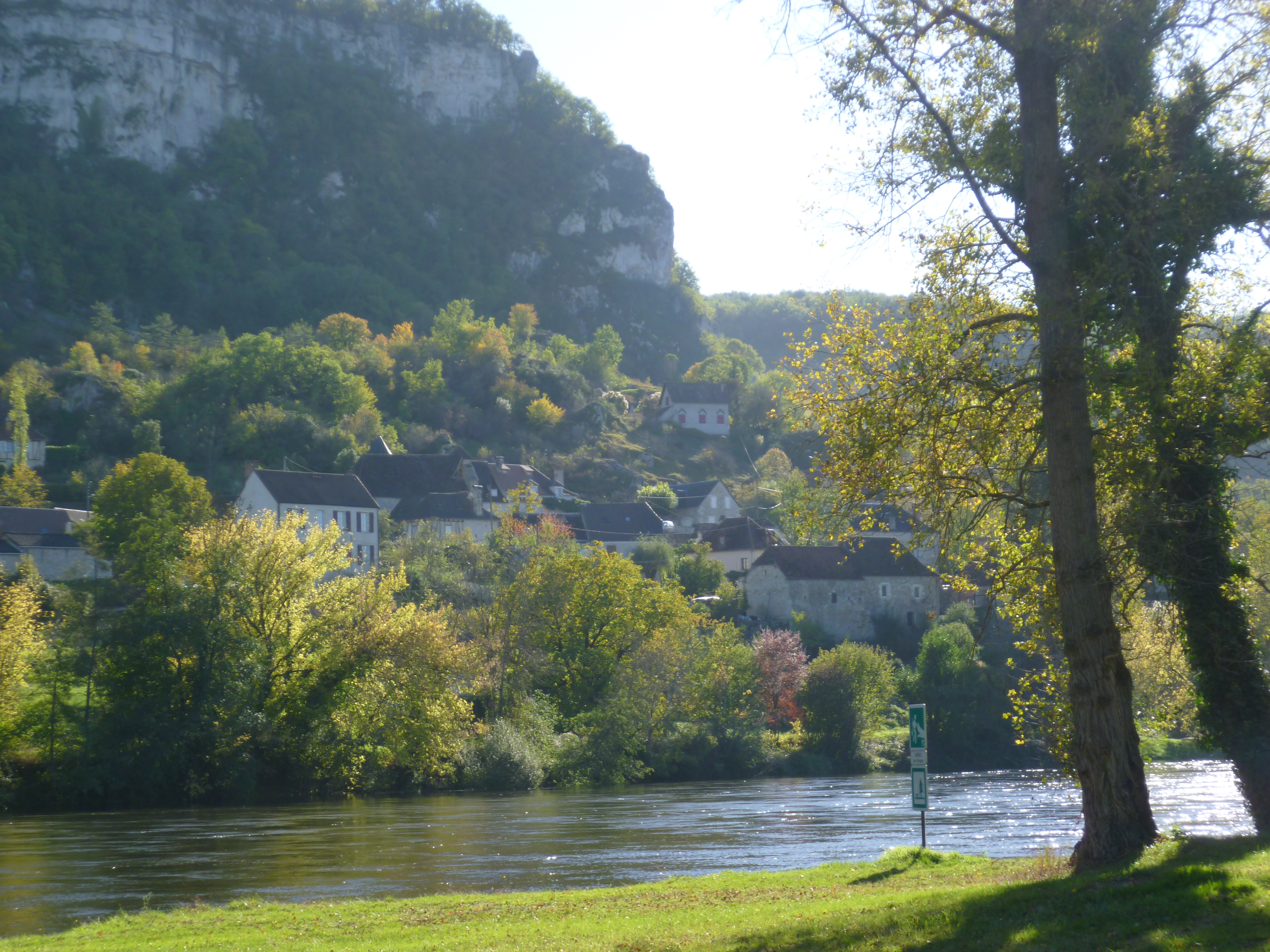
- The Dordogne at Vayrac, with the hamlet of Mézels in the background

- Coat of arms
- Location of Vayrac
- Location within France Location within Occitanie
- Coordinates: 44°57′13″N 1°42′18″E
- Country: France
- Region: Occitania
- Department: Lot
- Arrondissement: Gourdon
- Canton: Martel
- Intercommunality: Causses et Vallée de la Dordogne

Government
  - Mayor (2020–2026): Loïc Lavergne-Azard
- Area^{1}: 16.33 km^{2} (6.31 sq mi)
- Elevation: 139 m (456 ft)
- Highest elevation: 312 m (1,024 ft)
- Lowest elevation: 110 m (360 ft)
- Population (2023): 1,266
  - Density: 77.53/km^{2} (200.8/sq mi)
- Demonym(s): Vayracois, Vayracoises
- Time zone: UTC+01:00 (CET)
  - Summer (DST): UTC+02:00 (CEST)
- INSEE/Postal code: 46330 /46110
- ^{1} French Land Register data, which excludes lakes, ponds, glaciers > 1 km^{2} (0.386 sq mi or 247 acres) and river estuaries.

Vayrac (French pronunciation: [vɛʁak]; Occitan: Vairac) is a commune in the Lot department in south-western France. The inhabitants of Vayrac are called the Vayracois.

== Geography ==
=== Location ===
Vayrac is located in the Haut Quercy, in the north of the Lot, in the Valley of the Dordogne Lotoise between Martel and Bretenoux on the D803 and on the edge of the Sourdoire and Maumont rivers.

=== Neighbouring communes ===
The commune is bordering the Corrèze department.

=== Toponymy ===
The name Vayrac, of Gallo-Roman origin, is based on a surname Varius. The ending -ac is derived from the suffix Gallic -acon (itself from the common Celtic *-āko-), often Latinized in -acum in the texts. This is the domain of Varius.

== History ==
In the Vayrac commune is found the Gaulish oppidum of the Puy D'issolud (about 300 m above sea level). This site was officially recognised, in April 2001, by the French Ministry of Culture as the site of ancient Uxellodunum, the location of the last battle of Julius Caesar against the rebel Gauls in 51 B.C. post the Battle of Alesia. In addition to an impressive quantity of armaments (Gaulish and Roman arrows), the famous underground galleries have been discovered, made by the sappers of Caesar in order to divert the spring feeding the only source to which the Gauls could come too, to obtain their water supply.

During the Second World War, a number of works of the Louvre Museum were hidden in a barn in Vayrac. On a particularly hot and dry summer day, a fire broke out. The farm workers abandoned their fields to come and form a water-bucket chain and saved the national treasures.

== Places and monuments ==
- Église Saint-Martin - fortified church from the end of the 15th century or the beginning of the 16th century, classified as a historical monument on 3 May 1913.
- The Musée d'Uxellodunum (open July/August), place du 11-Novembre 1918 in Vayrac, presents a model of the historic site of Uxellodunum as well as a number of objects found during the various archaeological excavations campaigns (peaks of arrows, pottery, miscellaneous objects).
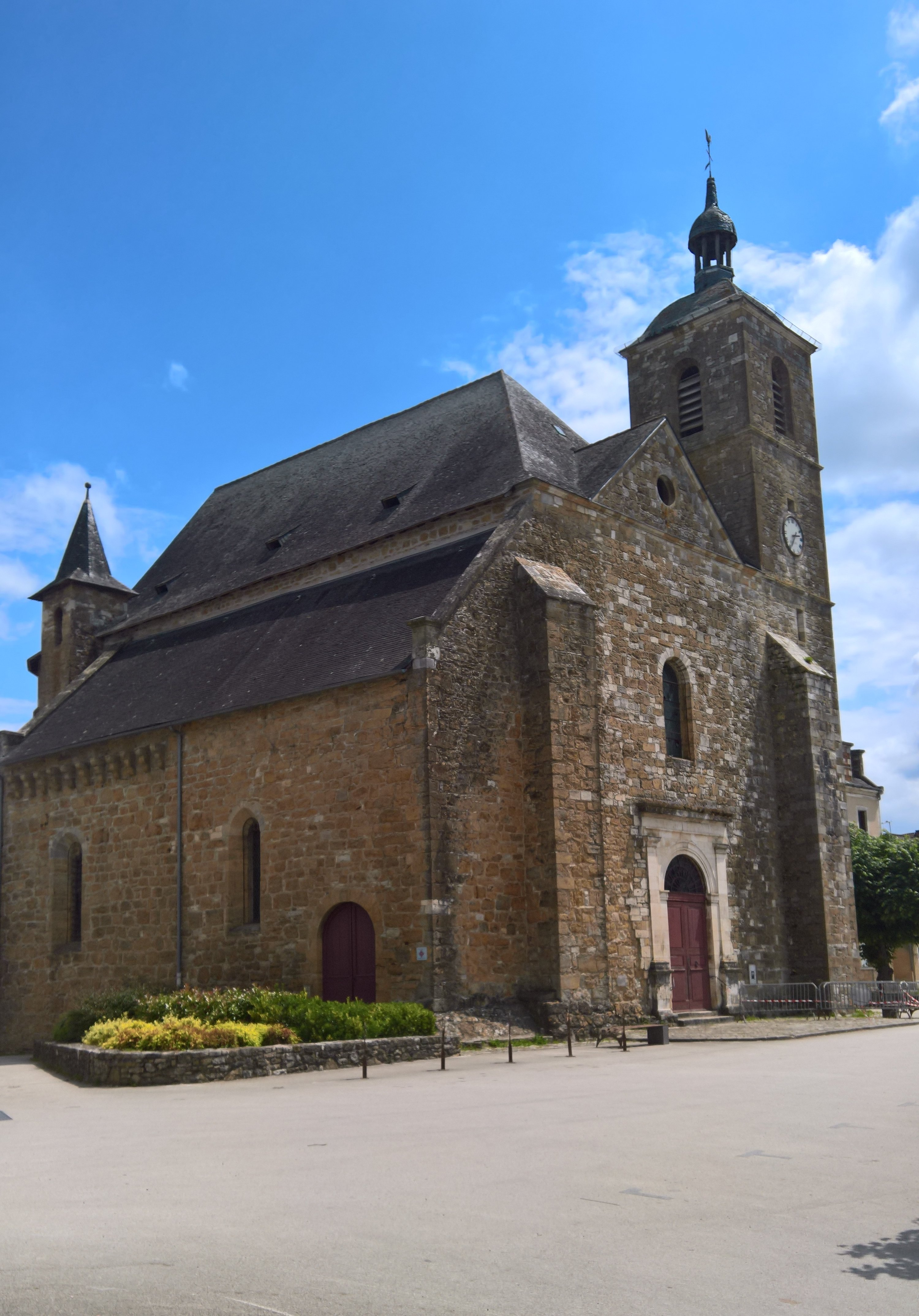
Église Saint-Martin

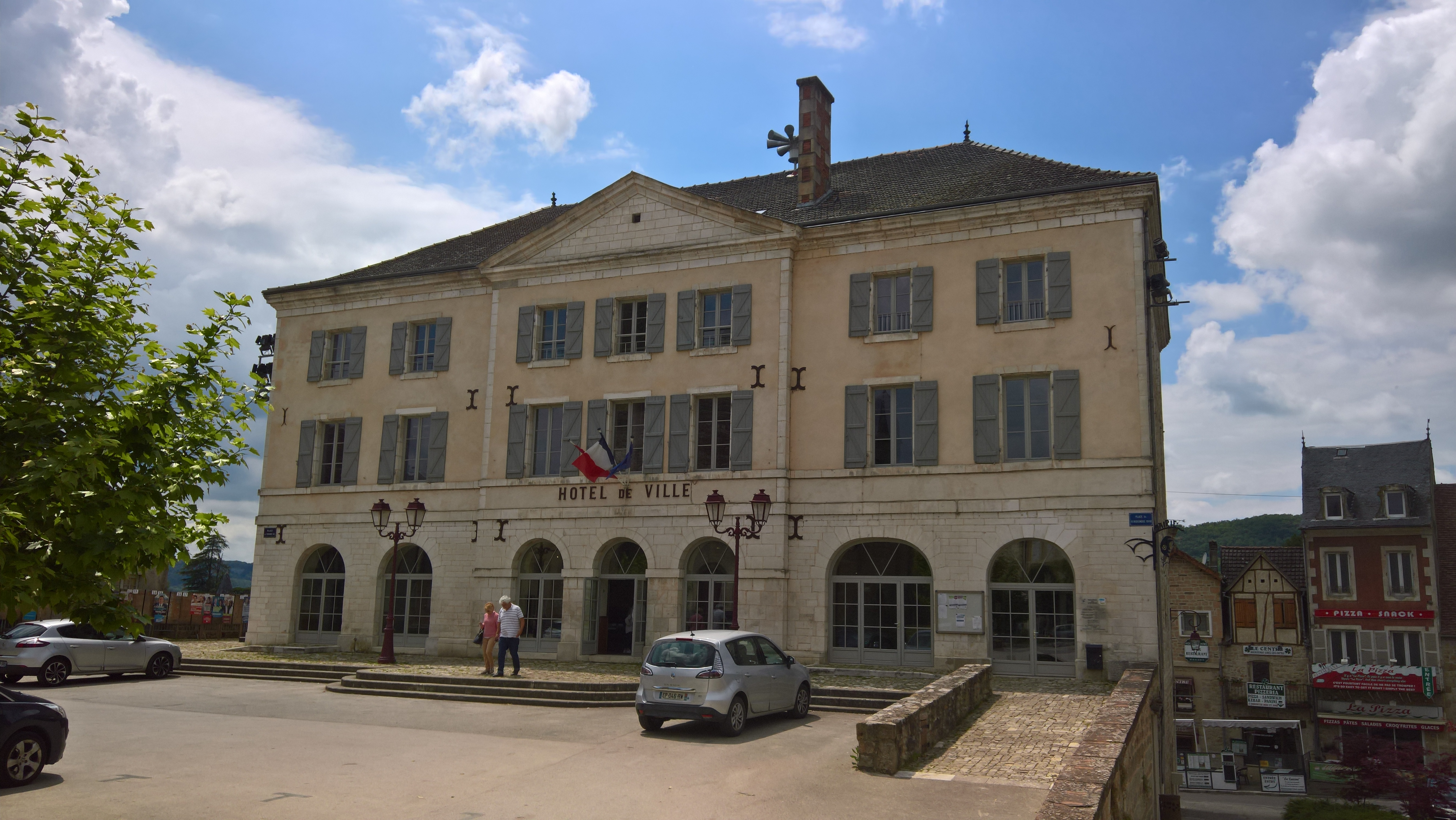
Town Hall

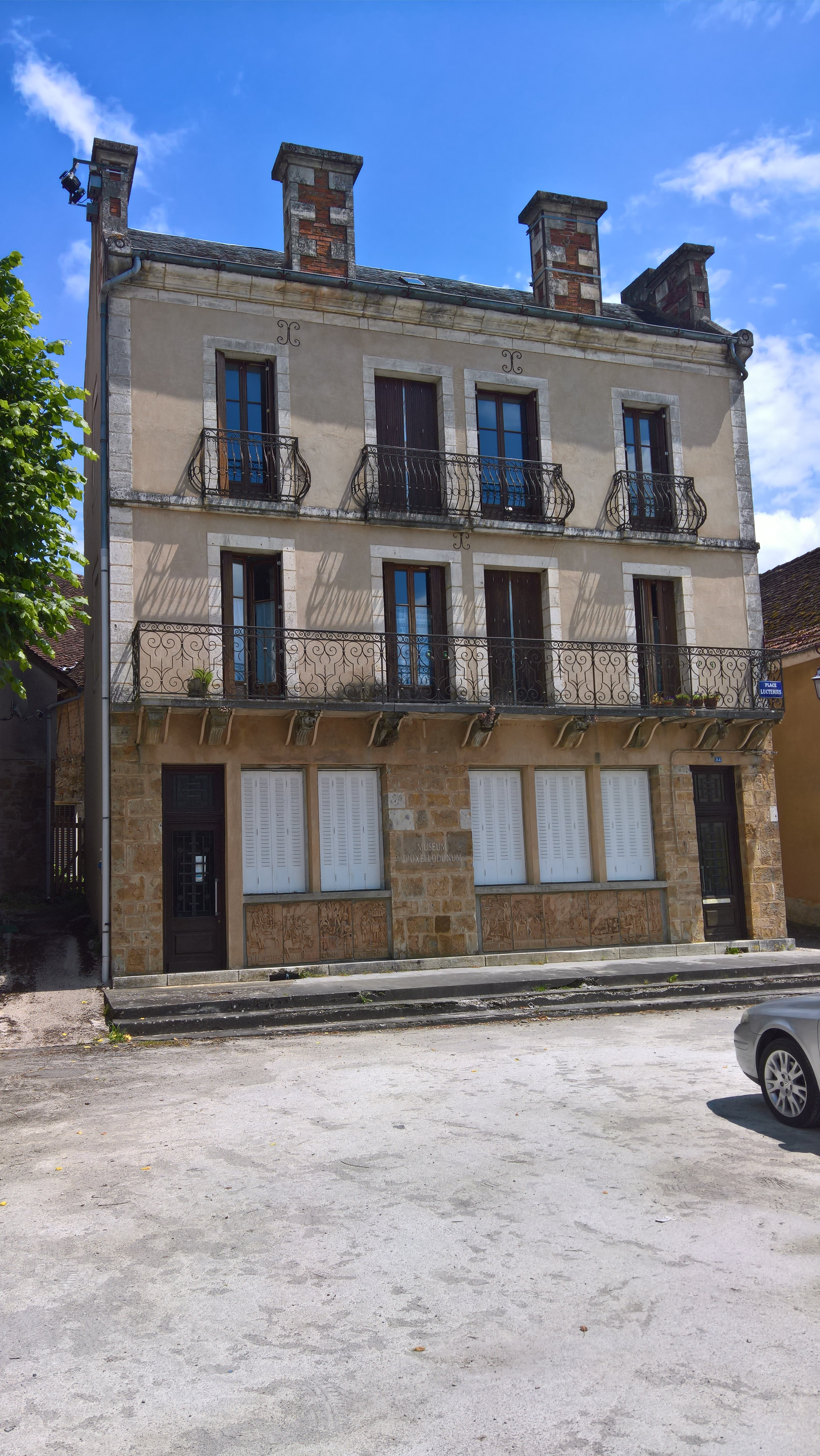
Musée d'Uxellodunum

== Notable persons ==
- Martin Malvy (born 1936), journalist, politician and former Minister in the French Government, current Conseil Régional of the Regional Council of Midi-Pyrénées, former Conseiller Général of the Lot elected in the canton of Vayrac.

== See also ==
- Communes of the Lot department
