= Condat, Lot =

Condat
- Commune
- Location of Condat
- Location within France Location within Occitanie
- Coordinates: 44°59′27″N 1°39′53″E
- Country: France
- Region: Occitania
- Department: Lot
- Arrondissement: Gourdon
- Canton: Martel
- Intercommunality: Causses et Vallée de la Dordogne

Government
  - Mayor (2020–2026): Fabrice Brousse
- Area^{1}: 6.12 km^{2} (2.36 sq mi)
- Elevation: 130 m (430 ft)
- Highest elevation: 249 m (817 ft)
- Lowest elevation: 116 m (381 ft)
- Population (2023): 410
  - Density: 67/km^{2} (170/sq mi)
- Time zone: UTC+01:00 (CET)
  - Summer (DST): UTC+02:00 (CEST)
- INSEE/Postal code: 46074 /46110
- ^{1} French Land Register data, which excludes lakes, ponds, glaciers > 1 km^{2} (0.386 sq mi or 247 acres) and river estuaries.

Condat (Occitan: Condat) is a commune in the Lot department in south-western France.

== See also ==
- Communes of the Lot department
