= Floirac, Lot =

Floirac
- Commune
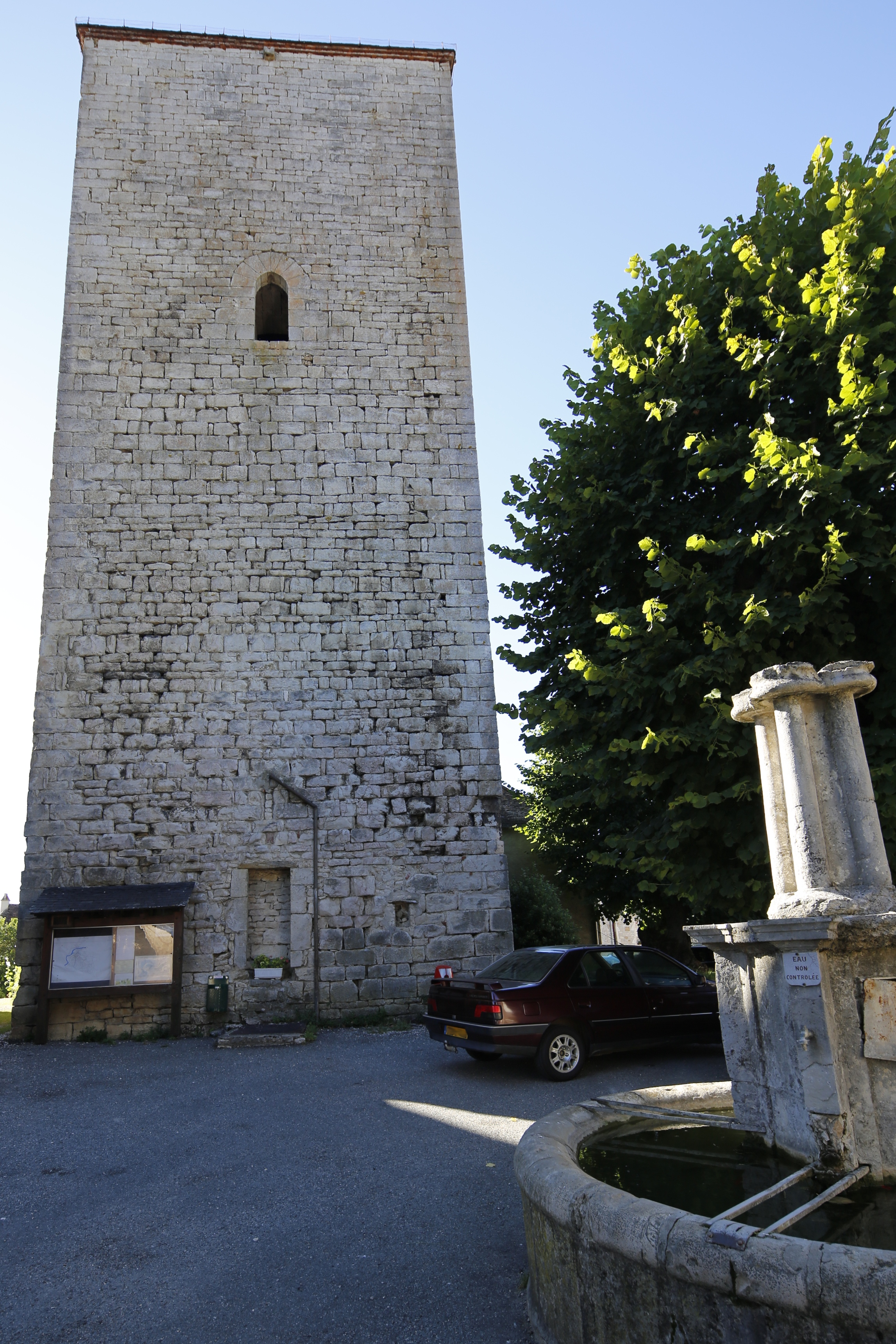
- The Tower of Floirac
- Location of Floirac
- Location within France Location within Occitanie
- Coordinates: 44°55′00″N 1°39′19″E
- Country: France
- Region: Occitania
- Department: Lot
- Arrondissement: Gourdon
- Canton: Martel
- Intercommunality: Causses et Vallée de la Dordogne

Government
  - Mayor (2020–2026): Alexandre Barrouilhet
- Area^{1}: 19.02 km^{2} (7.34 sq mi)
- Elevation: 132 m (433 ft)
- Highest elevation: 345 m (1,132 ft)
- Lowest elevation: 90 m (300 ft)
- Population (2023): 248
  - Density: 13.0/km^{2} (33.8/sq mi)
- Time zone: UTC+01:00 (CET)
  - Summer (DST): UTC+02:00 (CEST)
- INSEE/Postal code: 46106 /46600
- ^{1} French Land Register data, which excludes lakes, ponds, glaciers > 1 km^{2} (0.386 sq mi or 247 acres) and river estuaries.

Floirac (French pronunciation: [flwaʁak]) is a commune in the Lot department (46) in south-western France.

== Toponymy ==
The toponym Floirac is based on the Gallo-Roman anthroponymy Florus. The endpoint -ac is derived from the Gallic -acon suffix (itself of the common Celtic *-Āko-), often latinized in-acum in the texts. This Floracum toponym is found in Floracum fundum which meant: the domain of Florus.

== History ==
First written mention of Floirac is in the will of Adhémar de Turenne, viscount of Échelles, in the tenth century when its church was given to the abbey in Tulle.

== Geography ==
The commune is located in Quercy on the Causse of Floirac. It is watered by the Dordogne, and bordered to the north-west by its tributary, the Tourmente. Floirac has a surface of 19.02 km² and has 265 inhabitants (as of 2016), which makes a population density of 14 inhabitants per km². The coordinates are 44° 55' N and 1° 39' E. The altitude varies between 90 and 345 metres above sea level, with 140 metres at the town hall. The D43 road and a single track railway crosses it.

== Local government ==
List of successive mayors
Term	Name
2001–2014	Frédéric Bonnet-Madin
2014–2020	Raphaël Daubet
2020–incumbent	Alexandre Barrouilhet

== Places and monuments ==
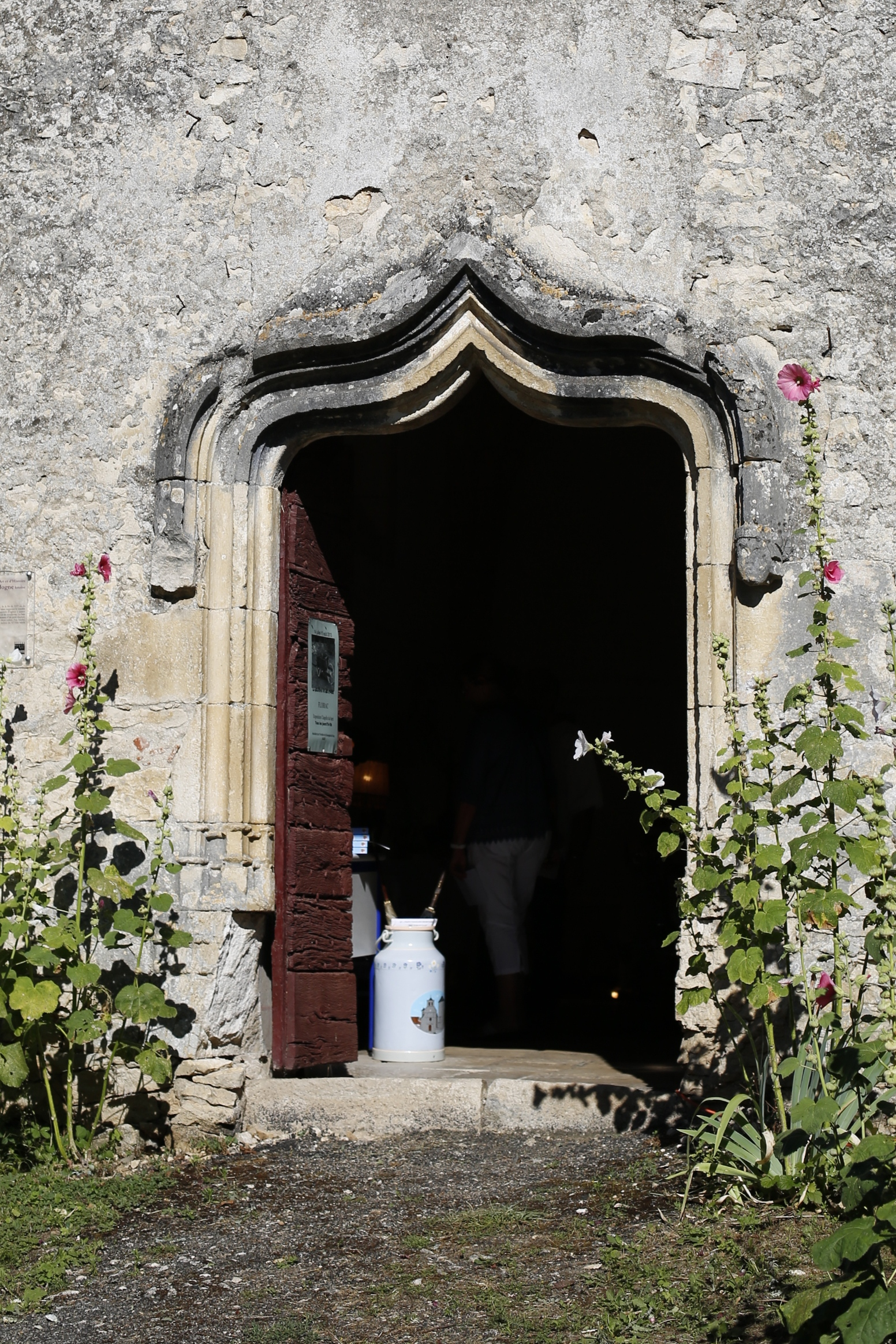
Entrance of the Chapelle Saint-Roch.

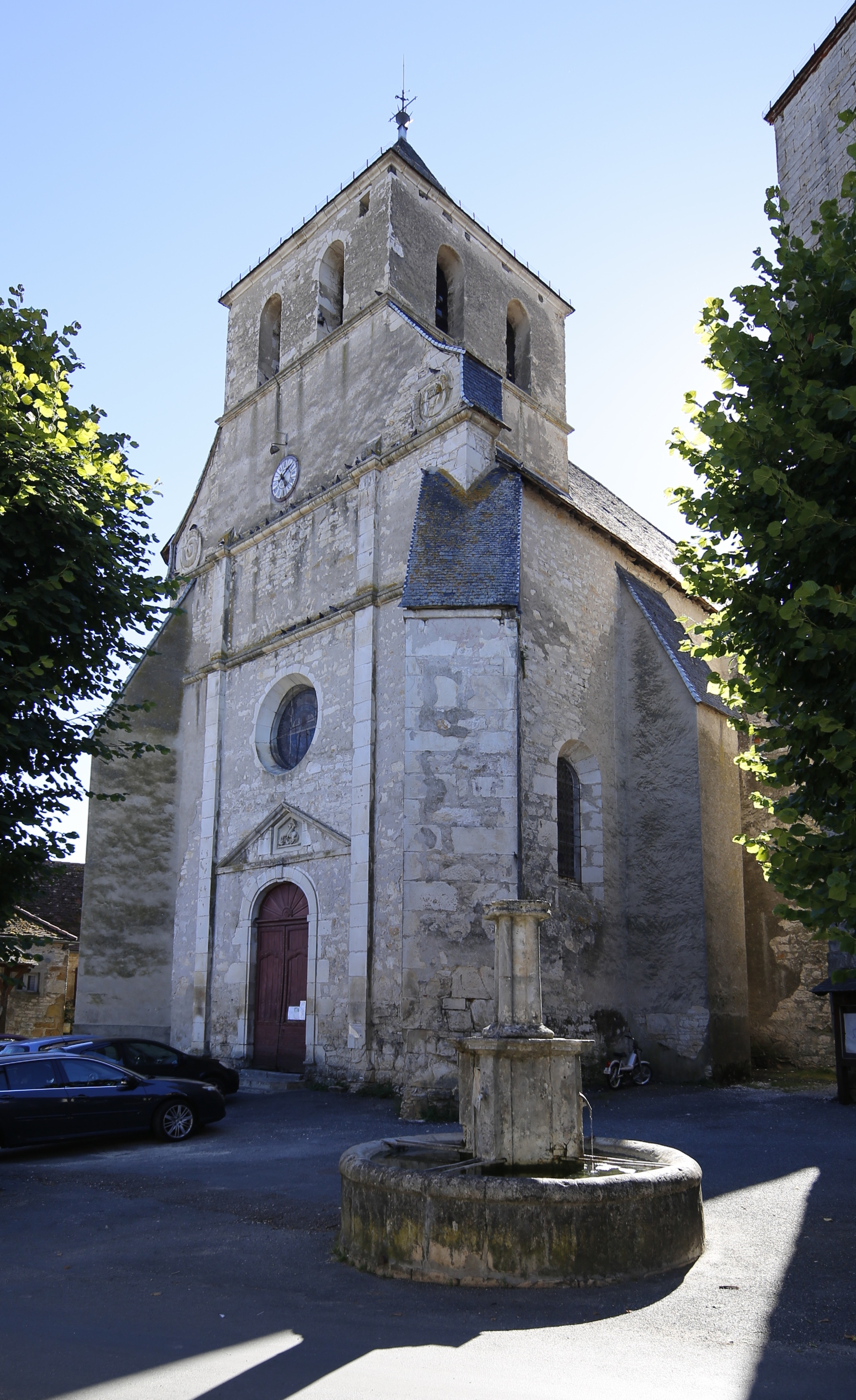
Church of Saint-Georges.

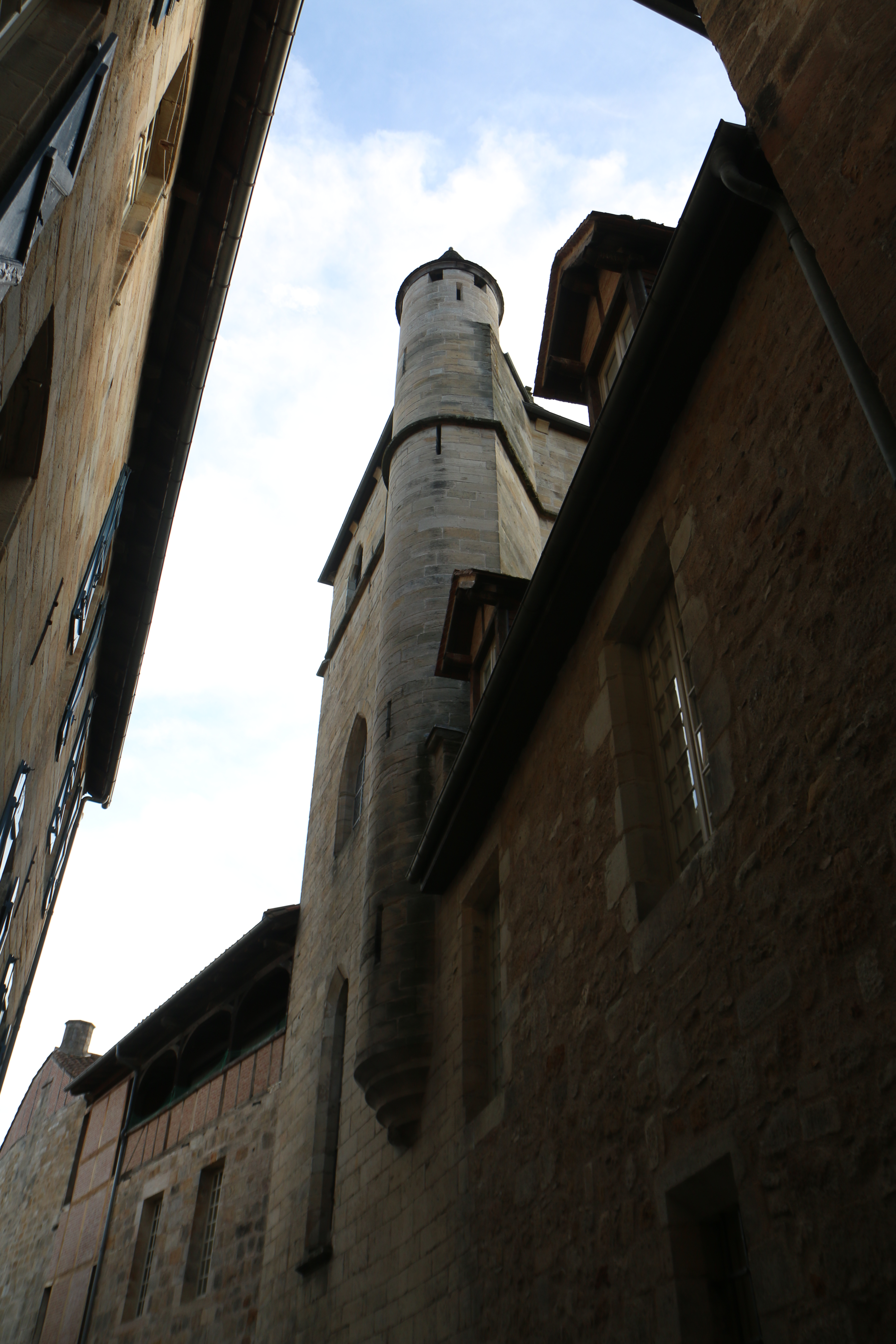
Tour de Floirac.
- Chapelle Saint-Roch de Floirac (15th century) Listed as a historic monuments on 10 December 1925
- Church Saint-Georges de Floirac (15th century) Listed as a historic monuments on 30 May 1978
- Tour de Floirac, dating from the Middle Ages, registered in the title of historical monuments on 8 August 2013

== Notable people ==
- Jean Dellac (1876-1937) French politician
- Raphael Daubet (1977-) French politician
- Max Pugh Film director and artist (1977-)
- Jean-Louis Ezine French writer and broadcaster

== See also ==
- Communes of the Lot department
