= Baladou =

- Commune
- Coat of arms
- Location of Baladou
- Location within France Location within Occitanie
- Coordinates: 44°55′26″N 1°33′24″E
- Country: France
- Region: Occitania
- Department: Lot
- Arrondissement: Gourdon
- Canton: Martel

Government
  - Mayor (2020–2026): Jean Delvert
- Area^{1}: 15.74 km^{2} (6.08 sq mi)
- Elevation: 283 m (928 ft)
- Highest elevation: 301 m (988 ft)
- Lowest elevation: 160 m (520 ft)
- Population (2023): 396
  - Density: 25.2/km^{2} (65.2/sq mi)
- Time zone: UTC+01:00 (CET)
  - Summer (DST): UTC+02:00 (CEST)
- INSEE/Postal code: 46016 /46600
- ^{1} French Land Register data, which excludes lakes, ponds, glaciers > 1 km^{2} (0.386 sq mi or 247 acres) and river estuaries.

Baladou (French pronunciation: [baladu]; Occitan: Valadon) is a commune in the Lot department in southwestern France.

== Population ==
Historical population
Year	Pop.	±% p.a.
1968	286	—
1975	271	−0.77%
1982	256	−0.81%
1990	295	+1.79%
1999	323	+1.01%
2007	400	+2.71%
2012	406	+0.30%
2017	399	−0.35%
2023	396	−0.13%
Source: INSEE

== See also ==
- Communes of the Lot department
