= Strenquels =

- Commune
- Coat of arms
- Location of Strenquels
- Location within France Location within Occitanie
- Coordinates: 44°59′08″N 1°38′18″E
- Country: France
- Region: Occitania
- Department: Lot
- Arrondissement: Gourdon
- Canton: Martel
- Intercommunality: Causses et Vallée de la Dordogne

Government
  - Mayor (2020–2026): Guy Gimel
- Area^{1}: 9.01 km^{2} (3.48 sq mi)
- Elevation: 155 m (509 ft)
- Highest elevation: 336 m (1,102 ft)
- Lowest elevation: 114 m (374 ft)
- Population (2023): 258
  - Density: 28.6/km^{2} (74.2/sq mi)
- Time zone: UTC+01:00 (CET)
  - Summer (DST): UTC+02:00 (CEST)
- INSEE/Postal code: 46312 /46110
- ^{1} French Land Register data, which excludes lakes, ponds, glaciers > 1 km^{2} (0.386 sq mi or 247 acres) and river estuaries.

Strenquels is a commune in the Lot department in south-western France.

== See also ==
- Communes of the Lot department
