= Cadurci =

Gallic tribe

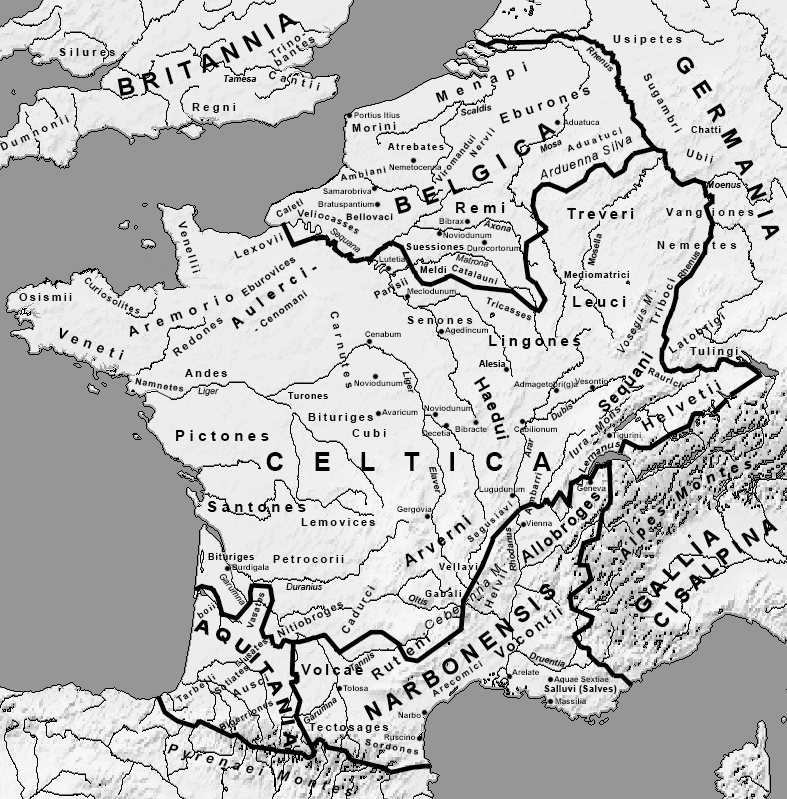
Map of Gaul with tribes, 1st century BC; the Cadurci are circled.

The Cadurci were a Gallic people dwelling in the later region of Quercy (modern southwestern France) during the Iron Age and the Roman period.

== Name ==
They are named in Latin as Cadurci by Caesar (mid-1st c. BC) and Pliny (1st c. AD), and in Greek as Kadou͂rkoi (Καδοῦρκοι) by Strabo (early 1st c. AD) and Ptolemy (2nd c. AD).

The etymology of Cadurci remains unclear. Pierre-Yves Lambert has proposed to interpret it as a haplology (loss of syllable) of the Gaulish compound Catu-turci ('battle-boars'), formed with the stem catu- ('combat, battle') attached to the plural of turcos ('wild boar').

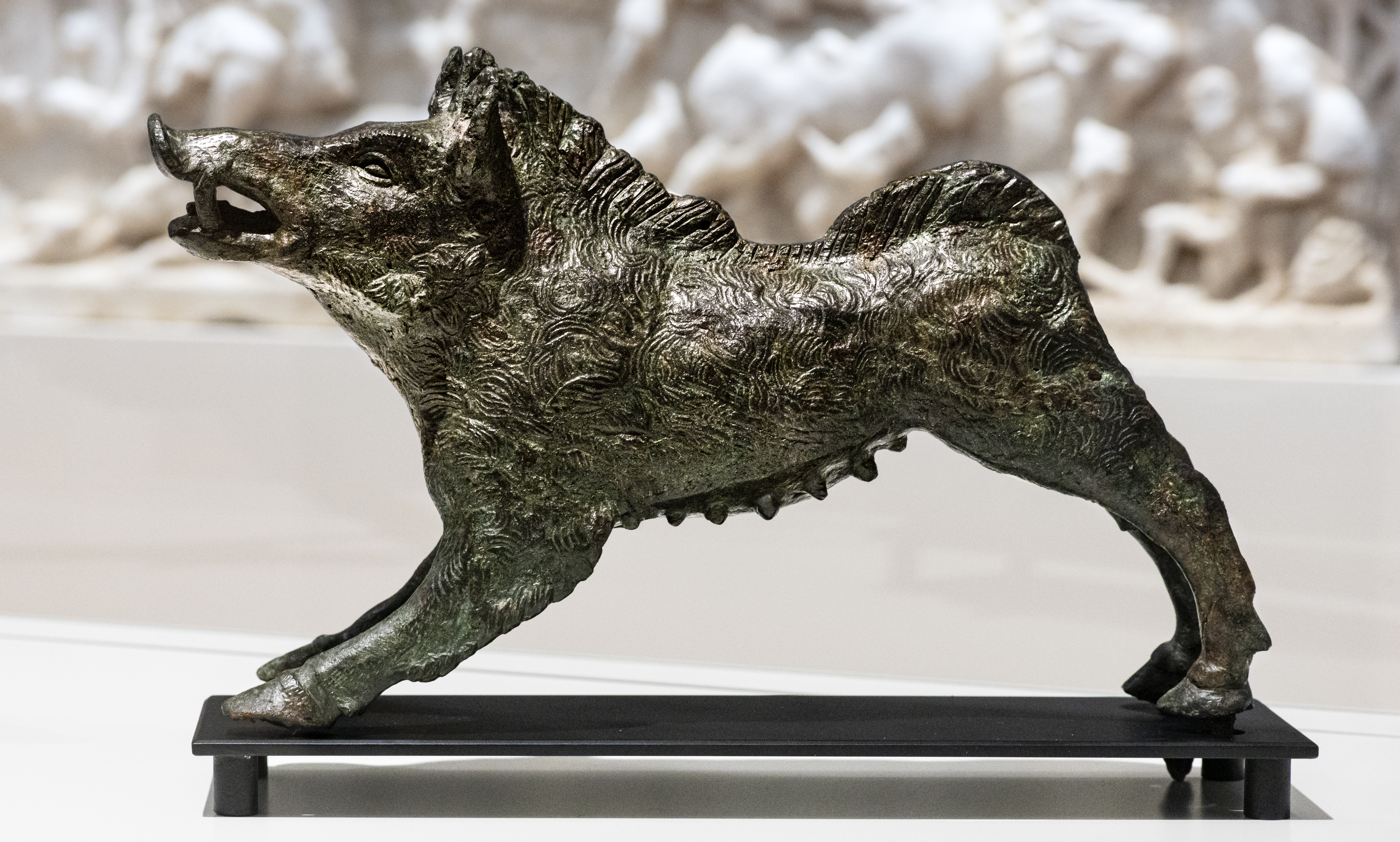
Boar figure discovered in Cahors, believed to be a symbol of the Cadurci

The city of Cahors, attested ca. 400 AD as civitas Cadurcorum ('civitas of the Cadurci'; Cauricio in 1200, Caurs in 1279), and the region of Quercy, attested in 565 AD as Cadurcinus (pagus Catorcinus in 628, Caercino in 1095, with Latin suffix -inus), both derive their names from the Gallic tribe.

== Geography ==
The Cadurci lived in the region of Quercy, corresponding to the civitas cadurcorum, one of the Gallo-Roman administrative districts of the province of Aquitania probably created between 16 and 13 BC during Augustus' stay in Gaul.

At the end of the Iron Age, their main oppida included Murcens, Uxellodunum, the Impernal (in modern Luzech), and the Césarines.

Their chief town during Roman times was Divona (modern Cahors), a toponym derived from the name of a divinity associated with the cult of water. The city was founded ex nihilo in a meander of the Lot river, possibly at the beginning of the Augustan period, through the transfer of the center of power from the oppidum of Murcens.

== History ==
In pre-Roman times, the Cadurci were clients of the Arverni.

During the Gallic Wars, their chief Lucterius, a companion of Vercingetorix, led an unsuccessful expedition in 52 BC involving the Ruteni, Gabali and Nitiobroges of the southern Massif Central against the Roman Province. After fighting at the Battle of Alesia (52 BC) and escaping the defeat, Lucterius joined the Senonan chief Drappes in the summer of 51 BC and again planned to invade Transalpine Gaul, but was pursued by the legate Caninius. Harassed by Roman forces, the Gallic leaders took refuge at Uxellodunum, where they were defeated by Roman forces under Caninius and Julius Caesar in August 51 BC. After the surrender, Lucterius was subsequently handed over to Caesar by the Arvernian leader Epasnactos.

In Roman times, the Cadurci were renowned for their linen workshops, where they produced mattresses, blankets, and other textiles that were sought after throughout the Empire.
