= Claudius Cayx-Dumas =

French Jesuit

Claudius Cayx-Dumas (1724–1792) was a French Jesuit. He joined the Society of Jesus in 1757.
