= Cuzance =

- Commune
- Location of Cuzance
- Location within France Location within Occitanie
- Coordinates: 44°57′52″N 1°32′23″E
- Country: France
- Region: Occitania
- Department: Lot
- Arrondissement: Gourdon
- Canton: Martel
- Intercommunality: Causses et Vallée de la Dordogne

Government
  - Mayor (2020–2026): Jean-Luc Laborie
- Area^{1}: 29.74 km^{2} (11.48 sq mi)
- Elevation: 233 m (764 ft)
- Highest elevation: 326 m (1,070 ft)
- Lowest elevation: 195 m (640 ft)
- Population (2023): 653
  - Density: 22.0/km^{2} (56.9/sq mi)
- Time zone: UTC+01:00 (CET)
  - Summer (DST): UTC+02:00 (CEST)
- INSEE/Postal code: 46086 /46600
- ^{1} French Land Register data, which excludes lakes, ponds, glaciers > 1 km^{2} (0.386 sq mi or 247 acres) and river estuaries.

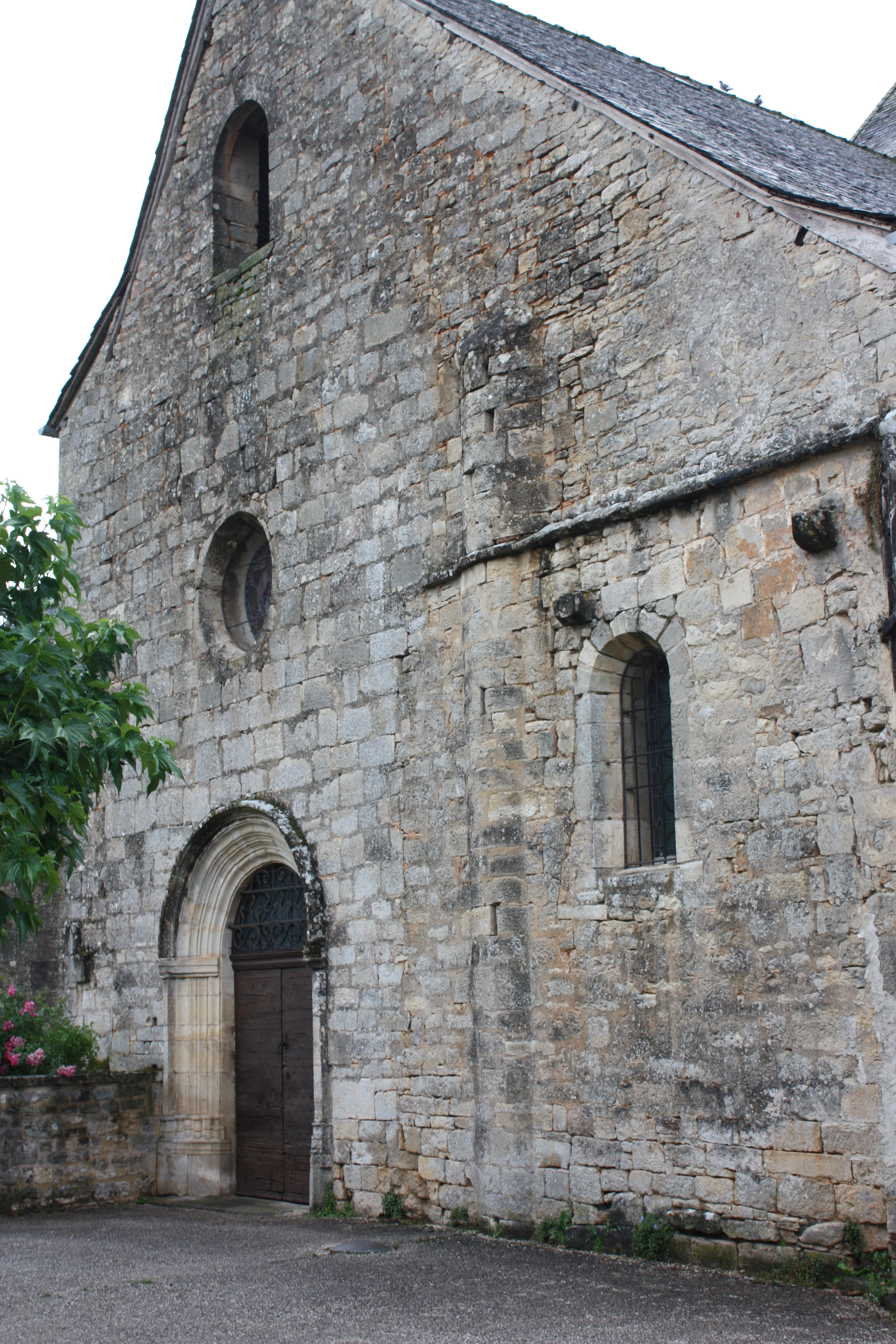
Cuzance - Church of Saint-Pierre-aux-Liens

Cuzance (French pronunciation: [kyzɑ̃s]; Occitan: Cusença) is a commune in the Lot department in south-western France.

== See also ==
- Communes of the Lot department
