= Condat-sur-Vézère =

- Commune
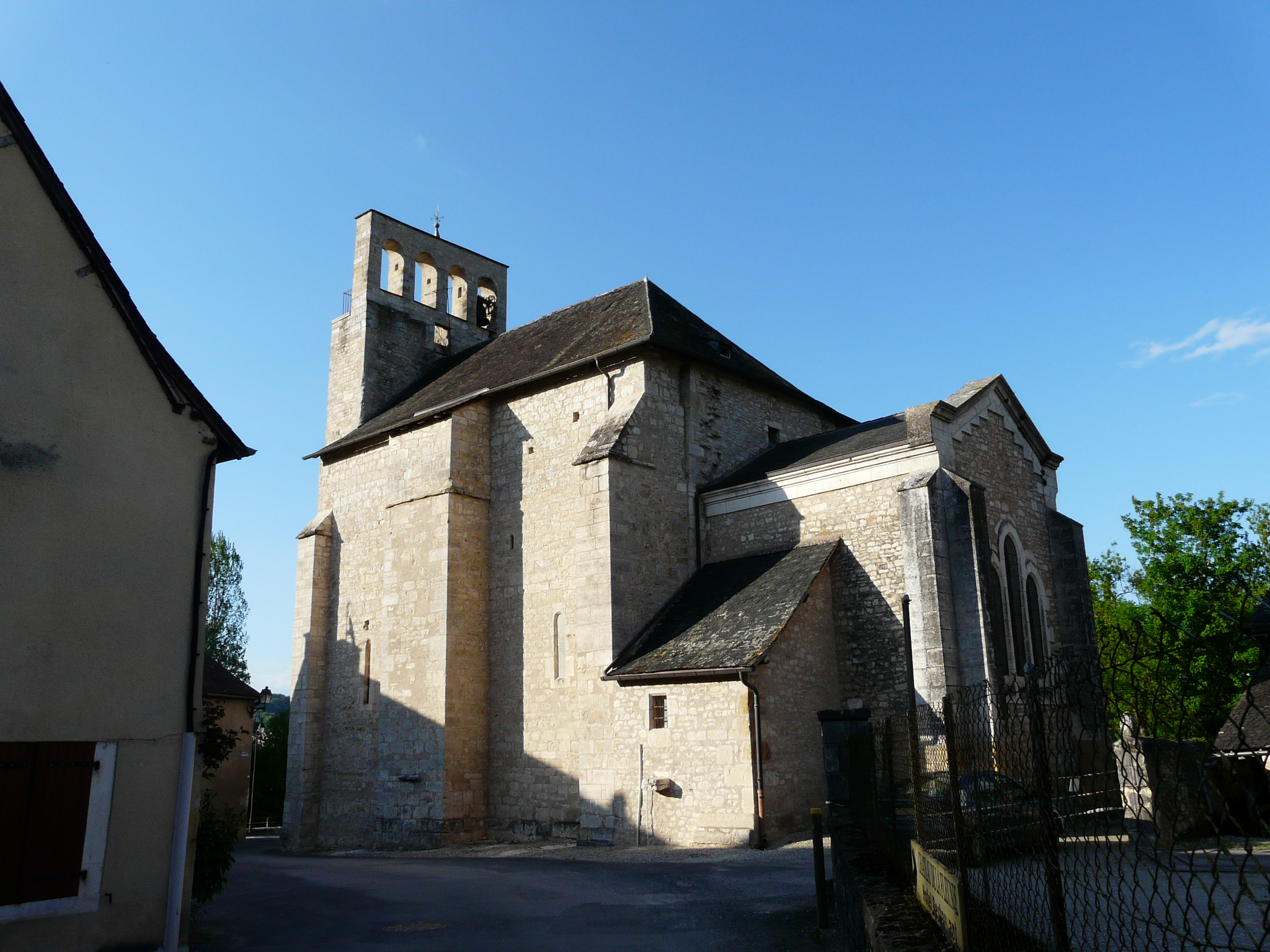
- The church in Condat-sur-Vézère

- Coat of arms
- Location of Condat-sur-Vézère
- Location within France Location within Nouvelle-Aquitaine
- Coordinates: 45°07′06″N 1°13′52″E
- Country: France
- Region: Nouvelle-Aquitaine
- Department: Dordogne
- Arrondissement: Sarlat-la-Canéda
- Canton: Terrasson-Lavilledieu

Government
  - Mayor (2020–2026): Stéphane Roudier
- Area^{1}: 16.64 km^{2} (6.42 sq mi)
- Elevation: 89 m (292 ft)
- Highest elevation: 258 m (846 ft)
- Lowest elevation: 70 m (230 ft)
- Population (2023): 859
  - Density: 51.6/km^{2} (134/sq mi)
- Time zone: UTC+01:00 (CET)
  - Summer (DST): UTC+02:00 (CEST)
- INSEE/Postal code: 24130 /24570
- ^{1} French Land Register data, which excludes lakes, ponds, glaciers > 1 km^{2} (0.386 sq mi or 247 acres) and river estuaries.

Condat-sur-Vézère (French pronunciation: [kɔ̃da syʁ vezɛʁ], literally Condat on Vézère; Occitan: Condat de Vesera) is a commune in the Dordogne department in Nouvelle-Aquitaine in southwestern France. Condat-Le Lardin station has rail connections to Bordeaux, Périgueux and Brive-la-Gaillarde.

== Population ==
Historical population
Year	Pop.	±% p.a.
1968	771	—
1975	855	+1.49%
1982	909	+0.88%
1990	907	−0.03%
1999	825	−1.05%
2007	833	+0.12%
2012	907	+1.72%
2017	882	−0.56%
2023	859	−0.44%
Source: INSEE

== See also ==
- Château de la Fleunie
- Château de la Petite Filolie
- Communes of the Dordogne department
