= Uxellodunum =

Iron Age hill fort in Lot, France

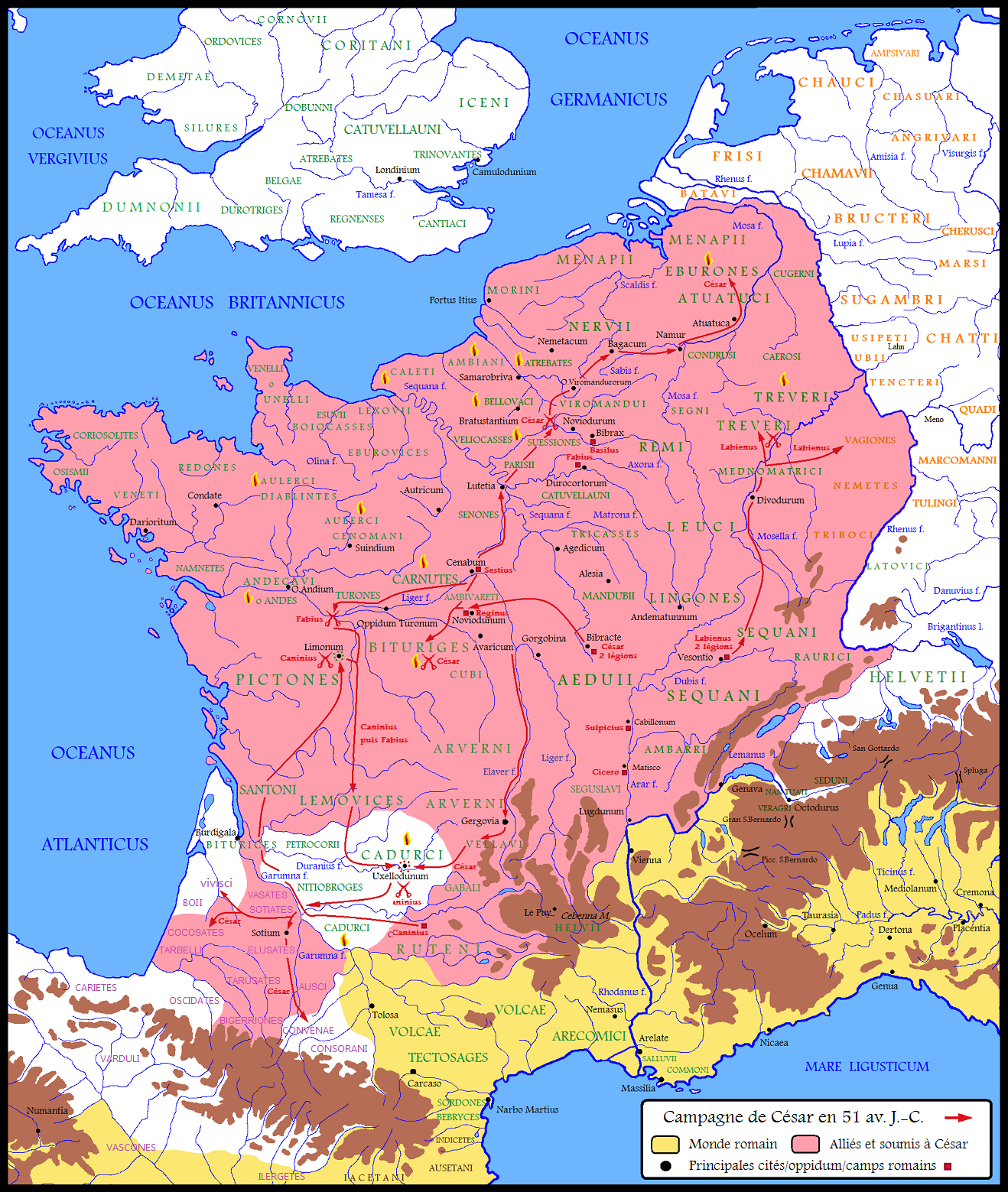
The siege in the campaign of 51 BC. Uxellodunum can be found on this map in the territory of the Cadurci in south west Gaul.

Uxellodunum is an Iron Age hill fort, or oppidum, located above the river Dordogne near the modern-day French village of Vayrac in the Lot department. This stronghold lay within the lands of the Cadurci tribe. According to Aulus Hirtius in his addendum to Julius Caesar's Commentaries on the Gallic War, the last revolt against Rome's authority in Gaul occurred here, and was brutally punished.

The Commentaries on the Gallic War describe Uxellodunum as being strongly fortified by its natural position, with a river dividing the valley below that almost surrounded the steep craggy mountain on which the citadel was built. The name apparently means "high fort"; "dun" is a Celtic word for fort, which is to be found in many place-names.

== Description of the siege ==
The main source of information about the siege in 51 BC is Book 8 of the Commentaries on the Gallic War. The siege is also mentioned briefly by the engineer Sextus Julius Frontinus in his book Stratagems.

The siege began after Lucterius, the leader of the Cadurci, and Drapes from the Senones, prepared Uxellodunum against a Roman assault. Caesar's commander in the area, the legate Gaius Caninius Rebilus, deployed his two legions. Informed by letter of the situation, Caesar decided to take personal charge of the siege.

=== Commentaries, Book 8 ===
Having arrived at Uxellodunum, contrary to the general expectation, and perceiving that the town was surrounded by the works, and that the enemy had no possible means of retiring from the assault, and being likewise informed by the deserters that the townsmen had abundance of corn, he endeavoured to prevent their getting water. A river divided the valley below, which almost surrounded the steep craggy mountain on which Uxellodunum was built. The nature of the ground prevented his turning the current: for it ran so low down at the foot of the mountain, that no drains could be sunk deep enough to draw it off in any direction. But the descent to it was so difficult, that if we made opposition, the besieged could neither come to the river nor retire up the precipice without hazard of their lives. Caesar perceiving the difficulty, disposed archers and slingers, and in some places, opposite to the easiest descents, placed engines, and attempted to hinder the townsmen from getting water at the river, which obliged them afterward to go all to one place to procure water.

— chapter 40 (Latin) p.221 book 8

Caesar saw that his work could never be brought to a successful conclusion if similar revolts were allowed to break out constantly in different parts of the county and believed his "clemency" was so well known that no one would think him a cruel man if he took severe measures. He, therefore, decided to deter all others by making an example of the defenders of Uxellodunum. All who had borne arms had their hands cut off and were then let go so that everyone might see what punishment was meted evildoers.

== Location and conservation of the site ==
In the 19th century, the location of Uxellodunum was controversial. Charles Athanase Walckenaer asserted that Uxellodunum was to be identified with the village of Capdenac- le -Haut (Lot départment) on the river Lot. The site of Cantayrac (Tarn-et-Garonne) was also proposed by Eloi Itard, André Noché and Fernand Réveille; in particular, this site corresponds much more than the others to the description made by Hirtius.

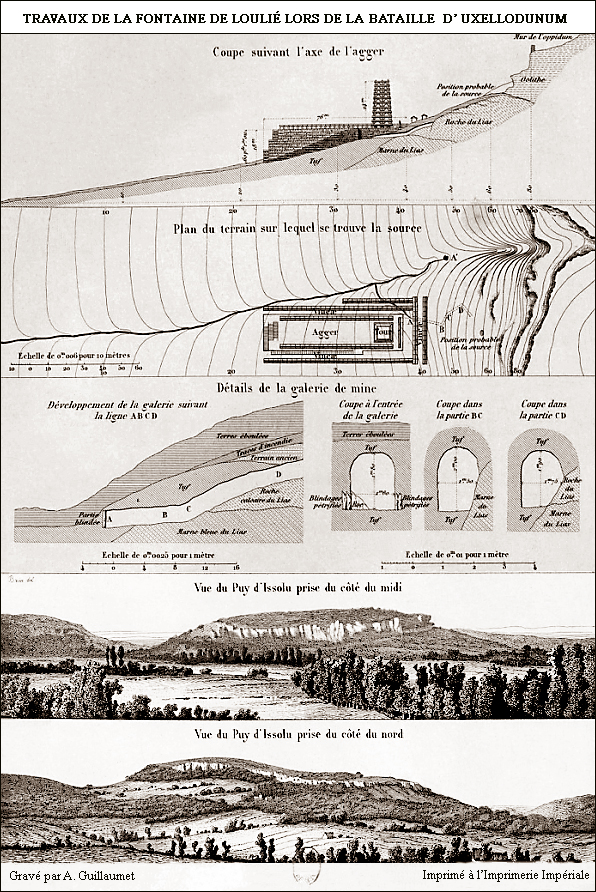

Napoleon III's history of Julius Caesar drew attention to features at Puy d'Issolud which appear to relate to the water engineering undertaken during the siege. Archaeological work has since validated the theory that the oppidum in question was at Puy d'Issolud. Weapons have been found there The site (44°57′N 1°41′E) was officially recognised by the French Ministry of Culture in 2001.

Various finds from Puy d'Issolud are displayed in the town of Martel at the Musée d'Uxellodunum, housed in a historic building, the Palais de la Raymondie. There is also a Musée Uxellodunum in Vayrac. There have been proposals to develop "quality" tourism at the site itself, which as of 2008 lacked interpretative material for visitors.
