= Creysse, Lot =

Creysse
- Commune
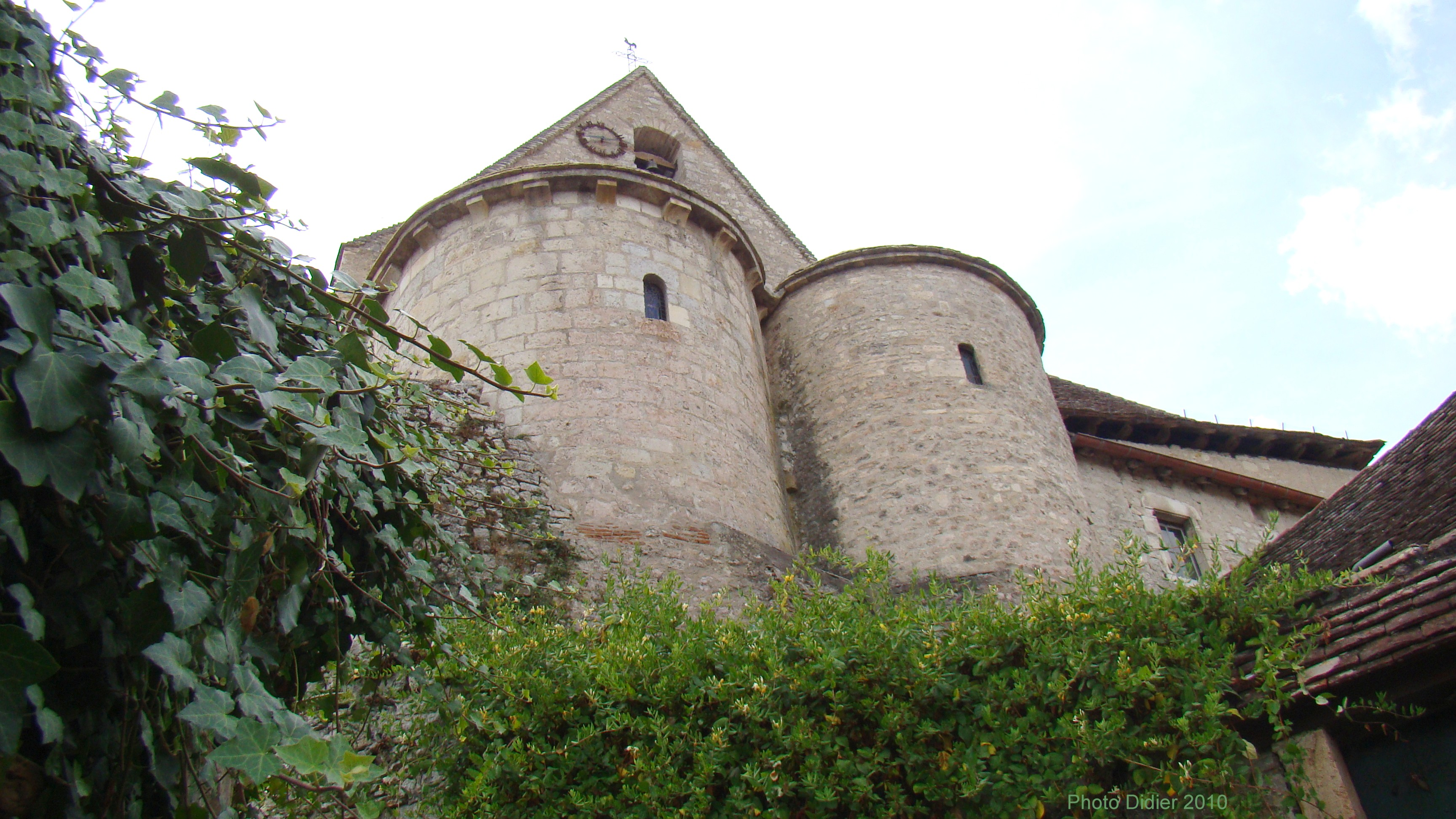
- The church in Creysse

- Coat of arms
- Location of Creysse
- Location within France Location within Occitanie
- Coordinates: 44°53′12″N 1°35′50″E
- Country: France
- Region: Occitania
- Department: Lot
- Arrondissement: Gourdon
- Canton: Martel
- Intercommunality: Causses et Vallée de la Dordogne

Government
  - Mayor (2020–2026): Guy Floirac
- Area^{1}: 9.51 km^{2} (3.67 sq mi)
- Elevation: 121 m (397 ft)
- Highest elevation: 316 m (1,037 ft)
- Lowest elevation: 95 m (312 ft)
- Population (2023): 313
  - Density: 32.9/km^{2} (85.2/sq mi)
- Time zone: UTC+01:00 (CET)
  - Summer (DST): UTC+02:00 (CEST)
- INSEE/Postal code: 46084 /46600
- ^{1} French Land Register data, which excludes lakes, ponds, glaciers > 1 km^{2} (0.386 sq mi or 247 acres) and river estuaries.

Creysse (French pronunciation: [kʁɛs]; Occitan: Crèissa) is a commune in the Lot department in south-western France.

== See also ==
- Communes of the Lot department
