= Canton of Martel =

Coordinates: 44.94°N 1.61°E

The canton of Martel is an administrative division of the Lot department, southern France. Its borders were modified at the French canton reorganisation which came into effect in March 2015. Its seat is in Martel.

It consists of the following communes:

1. Baladou
2. Bétaille
3. Carennac
4. Cavagnac
5. Condat
6. Cressensac-Sarrazac
7. Creysse
8. Cuzance
9. Floirac
10. Martel
11. Montvalent
12. Saint-Denis-lès-Martel
13. Saint-Michel-de-Bannières
14. Strenquels
15. Vayrac
16. Le Vignon-en-Quercy
