= Goujounac =

- Commune
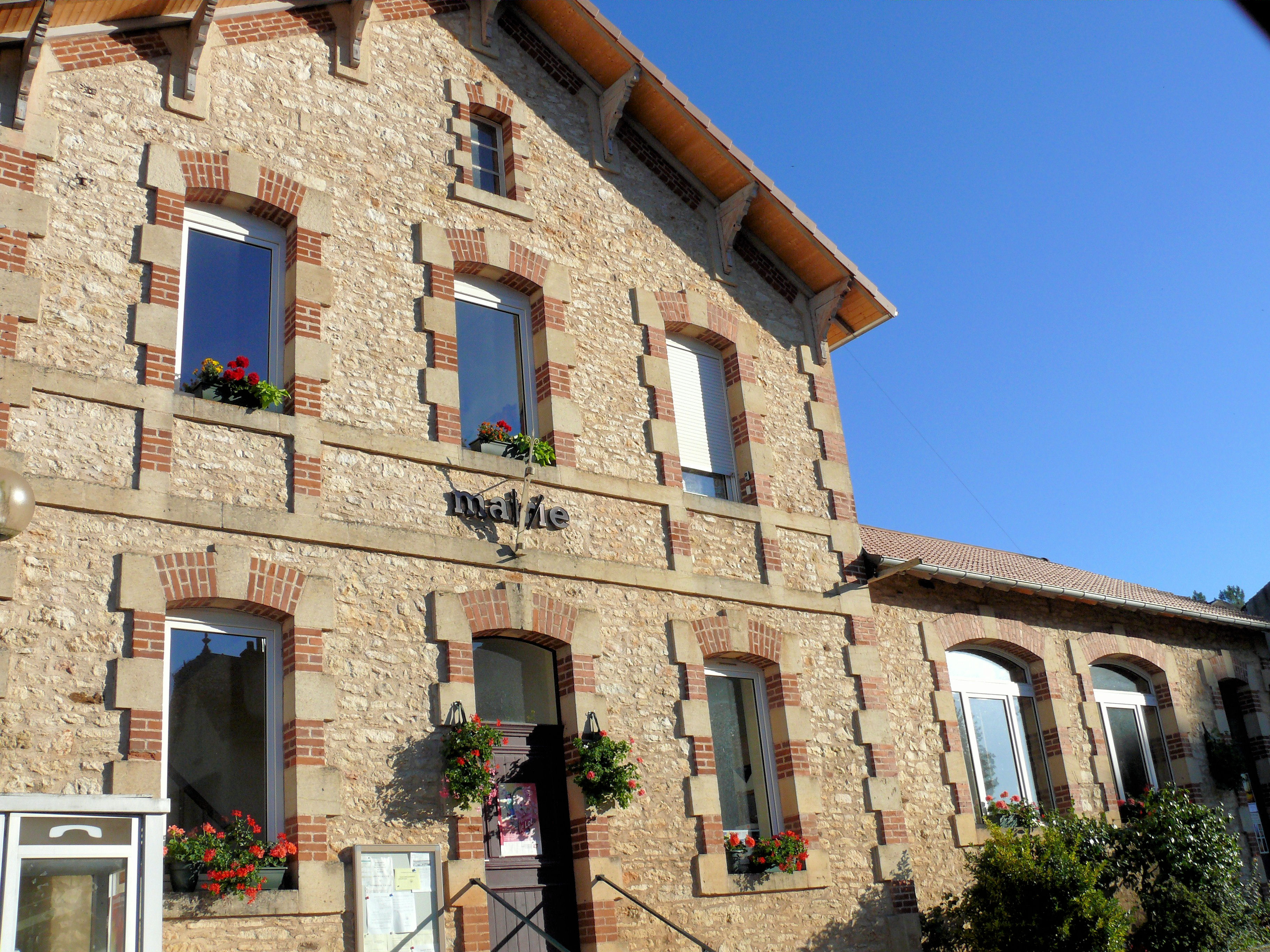
- The town hall in Goujounac
- Location of Goujounac
- Location within France Location within Occitanie
- Coordinates: 44°34′38″N 1°11′51″E
- Country: France
- Region: Occitania
- Department: Lot
- Arrondissement: Gourdon
- Canton: Puy-l'Évêque

Government
  - Mayor (2022–2026): Lucy Vinges
- Area^{1}: 10.38 km^{2} (4.01 sq mi)
- Elevation: 254 m (833 ft)
- Highest elevation: 306 m (1,004 ft)
- Lowest elevation: 130 m (430 ft)
- Population (2023): 220
  - Density: 21/km^{2} (55/sq mi)
- Time zone: UTC+01:00 (CET)
  - Summer (DST): UTC+02:00 (CEST)
- INSEE/Postal code: 46126 /46250
- ^{1} French Land Register data, which excludes lakes, ponds, glaciers > 1 km^{2} (0.386 sq mi or 247 acres) and river estuaries.

Goujounac is a commune in the Lot department in south-western France.

== Geography ==
Goujounac is located in the Lot valley about 30 km to the west of Cahors and 9 km south of Cazals.

It makes up for one point in a quiet triangle of villages in the Lot, the others being Frayssinet-le-Gelat and the smaller Pomarede, both 3 km (1.9 mi) away.

Situated 30 km (19 mi) southeast of Goujounac lies Cahors, the Lot's largest town. Closer to hand are the pleasantly sleepy market towns of Puy-l'Évêque and Prayssac, both roughly 10 km (6.2 mi) away.

== Sights ==
Architecturally, Goujounac is very traditional in style and therefore akin to many of the villages in this corner of the Lot. Presenting pretty, well-preserved stone houses and barns along the main road with further reaches of the village also well maintained, the village has a number of simply preserved back streets to wander. The centre of the village is dominated by its ancient 12th century Romanesque church, evidence in itself that Goujounac has been a community for many years.

== Demographics ==
Most of the village's 250 population are French, though there are Portuguese, British, Belgian and Dutch living here and in nearby areas now as well.

The village is a quiet place in the evenings and it sees much passing trade during the day throughout the summer as it is situated on the D660 which runs north to south. Although the road occasionally becomes fairly busy during the peak tourist months, traffic never becomes sufficiently heavy to be considered a disturbance. As with many places around here, its population increases with the coming of summer and 'les grandes vacances', but its quiet charm never really succumbs at all.

== Amenities ==
There is a swimming pool and a campsite with tennis courts at the top of the village, about 5 minutes walk from the centre. There has been no commercial centre to Goujounac.

== See also ==
- Communes of the Lot department
