= Cahors wine =

French red wine

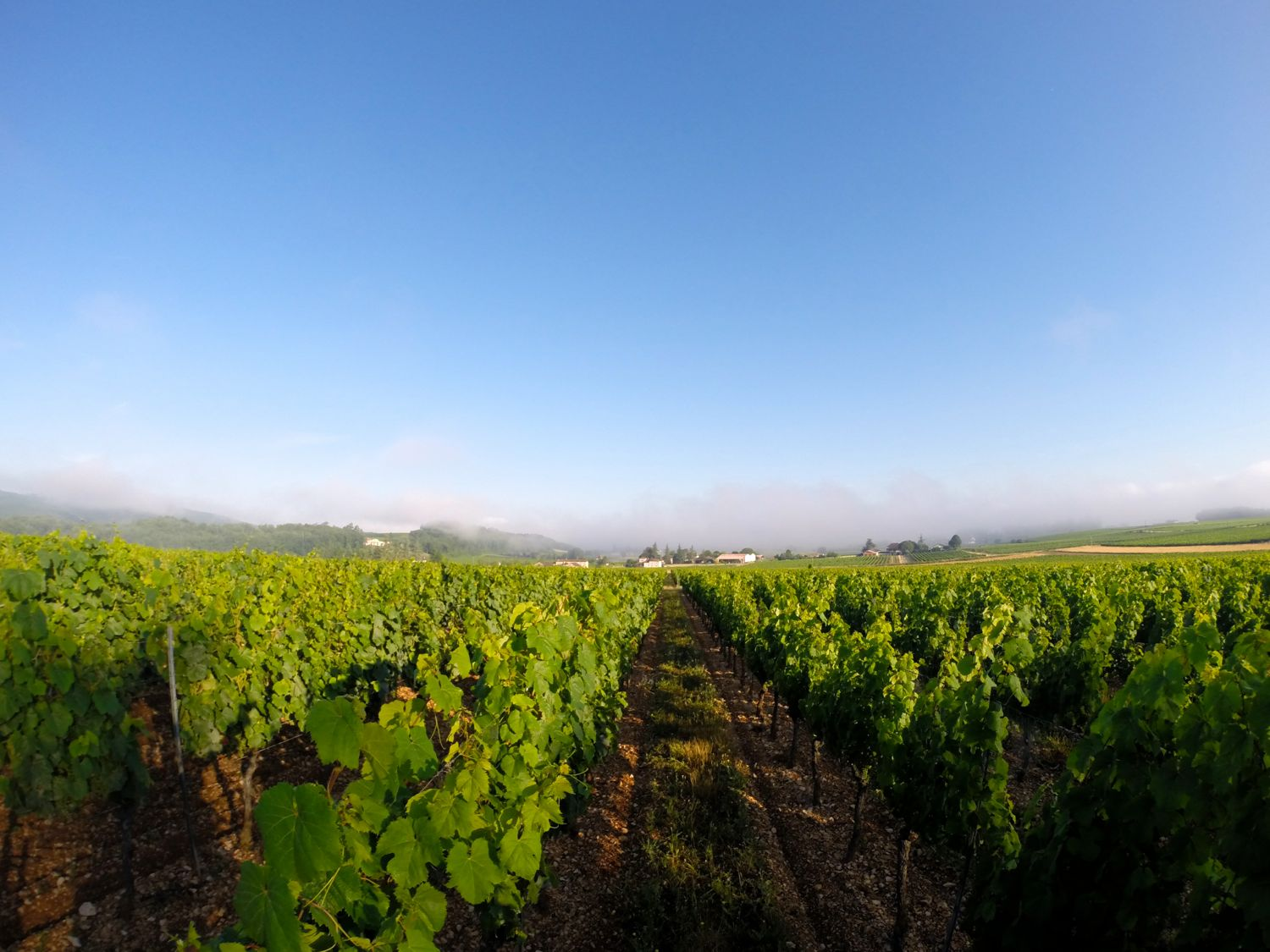
Vineyards of Château du Cèdre near Cahors

Cahors (pronounced [ka.ɔʁ]) is a red wine made from grapes grown in or around the town of Cahors in the Lot department of southern France. Cahors is an Appellation d'origine contrôlée (AOC) (Controlled designation of origin) associated with part of the South West France wine-region. The dominant grape variety in AOC Cahors wines, Malbec (known locally as "Auxerrois” or "Côt") must make up a minimum of 70% of the wine. Winemakers may supplement the Malbec with up to 30% Merlot and/or Tannat. Marketers may use the designation AOC Cahors only for red wines - they distribute the white and rosé wine produced in the same area under the designation Vin de Pays du Lot instead.

Cahors vineyards comprise 4,200 hectares (10,000 acres), with a planting density of at least 4,000 vines per hectare. Today's wine-growing area lies mainly west of the town of Cahors. The most important places are Mercuès, Parnac, Luzech, Prayssac, Grézels, Puy-l'Éveque and Vire sur Lot - all located in the valley of the Lot river.

== History ==
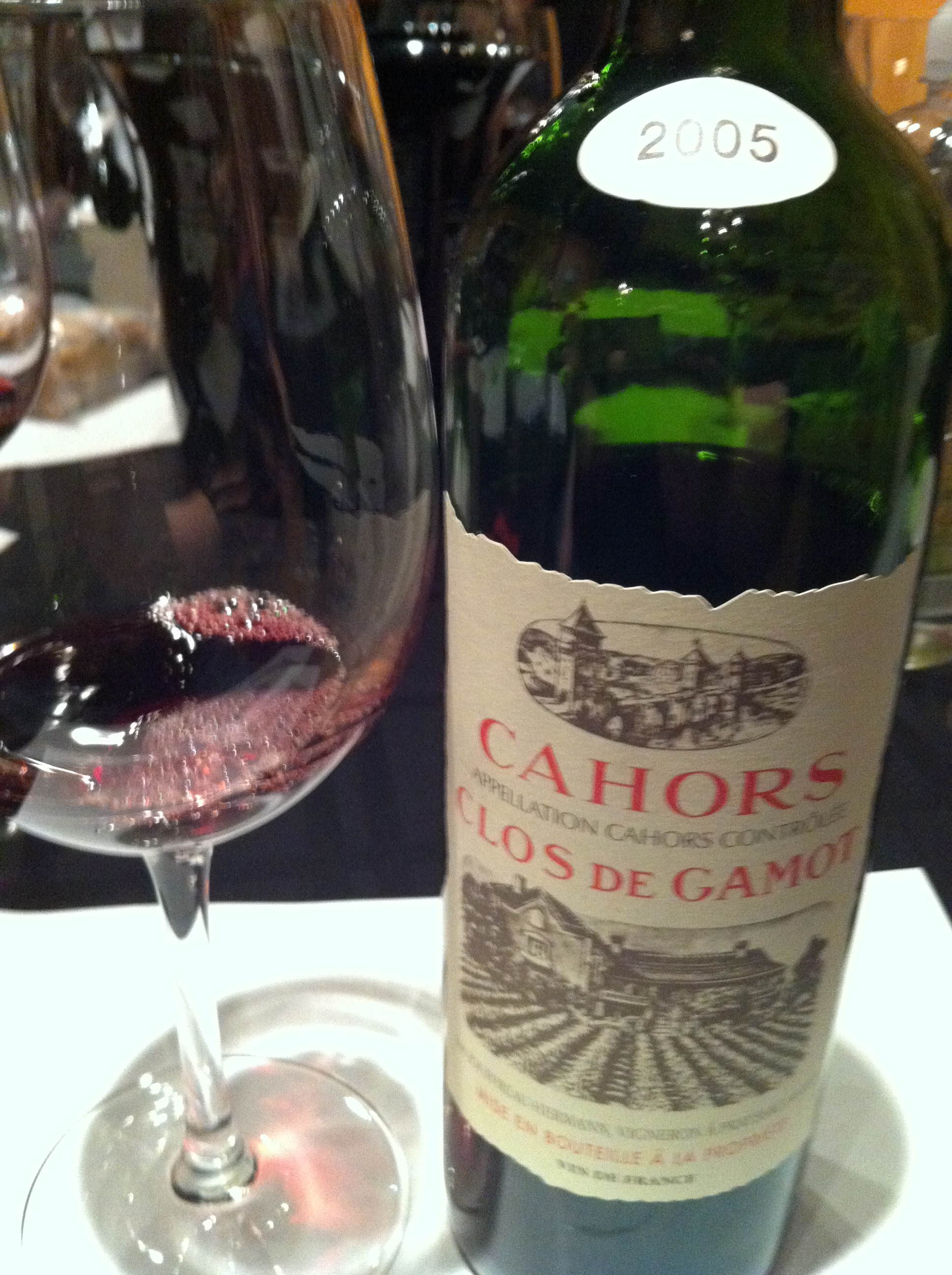
A Cahors wine

The history of Cahors winemaking goes back to the era of Ancient Rome, with vines being planted in the area around 50 BC. Since that time, the vines have remained in the land of Quercy and their history has been combined with that of the region.

The region of Cahors enjoyed a great reputation from the Middle Ages until the late 19th century. In the 13th century, it was shipped to England via Bordeaux by the Cahorsins traders. Later on, the Cahors "black wine" was sold shipped from England to Russia. Similar to many other winemaking regions, Cahors was hit badly by The Great French Wine Blight in the late 19th century, when the vines were attacked in the phylloxera epidemic. In the case of Cahors, this happened in 1883–1885.

In February 1956, Cahors was hit by frosts that wiped out almost all the vineyards of the region, which thus needed to be replanted en masse. In this replanting, Malbec became more dominant than it had been before. Cahors was awarded AOC status in 1971.

Since 2007, the UIVC (Interprofessional Wine Union of Cahors) has developed an association with Wines of Argentina, the agency in charge of promoting Argentine wines at an international level. The same agency originally created World Malbec Day, which is celebrated on the 17th of April every year.

== Soils and climate ==
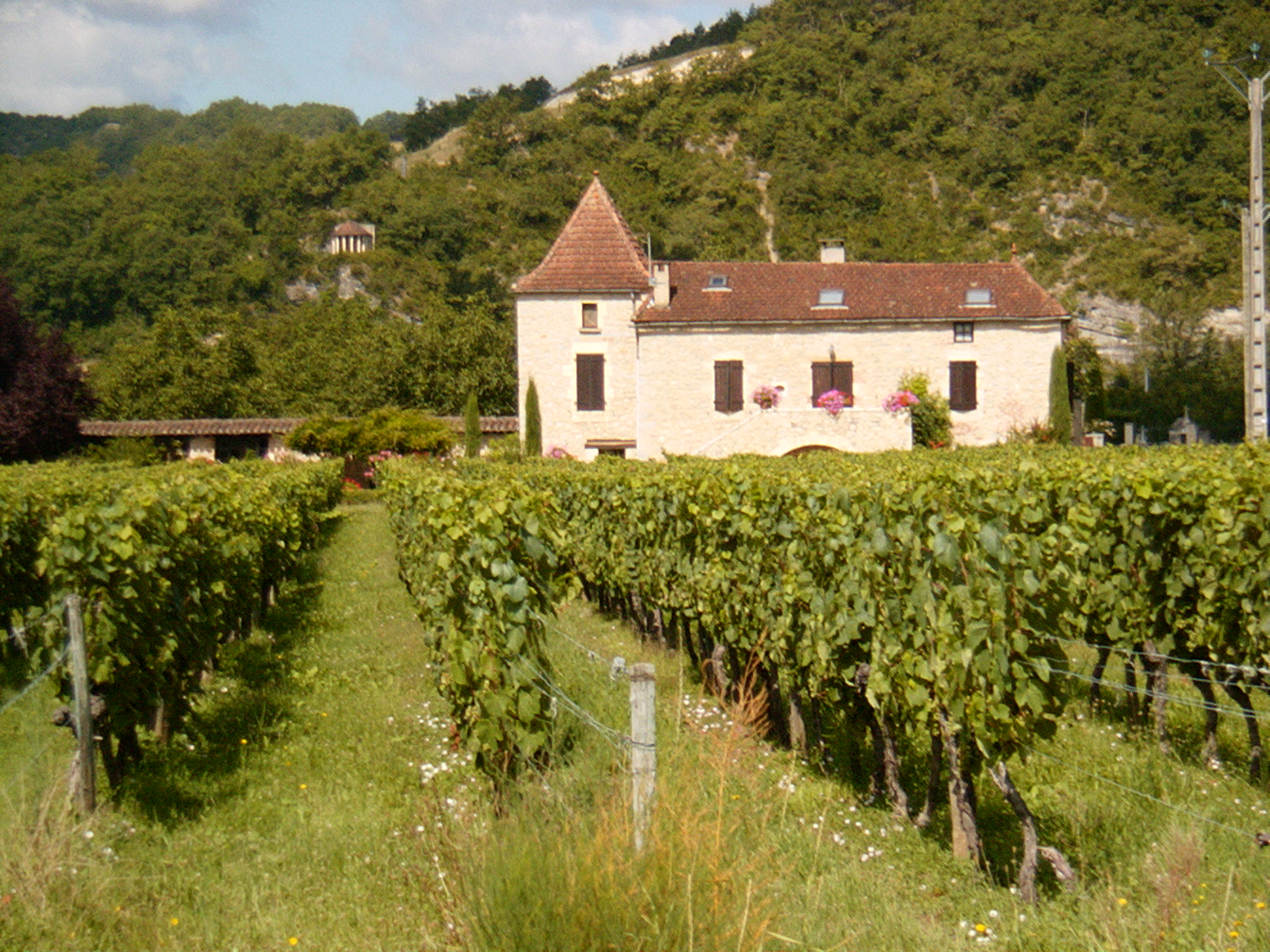
A vineyard in Cahors

Most of the vineyards are located on the gravel terraces within the meanders formed by the river Lot. The lowest terrace is too close to the river and therefore not suitable for viticulture; vineyards have only been established on the second, third, and fourth terraces. There is increasing interest in the plateau (technically the fourth terrace) for viticulture called "Les Causses".

The climate of Cahors is mainly influenced by the Atlantic Ocean, with hot summers and wet winters. In contrast to Bordeaux, it also is influenced by the Mediterranean Sea. The river Lot is an important factor for the microclimate in the vineyards, especially as the nearby Massif Central may occasionally cause severe frost in winter.

== Wineries ==
Wineries include Château du Cèdre, Château Rouffiac, Château Bovila, Clos de Gamot, Château de Haute-Serre, Mas del périé Fabien Jouves, Château de Mercuès, Clos La Coutale, Château La Caminade, Château de Lagrézette, Château Saint-Didier-Parnac, Château Haut-Monplaisir, Château Famaey, Château Chambert, Château Lacapelle Cabanac and Château de Cayx.

== Kagor wine ==
Kagor is a Moldovan wine made from Cabernet Sauvignon grapes. Its name comes from Cahors, France.

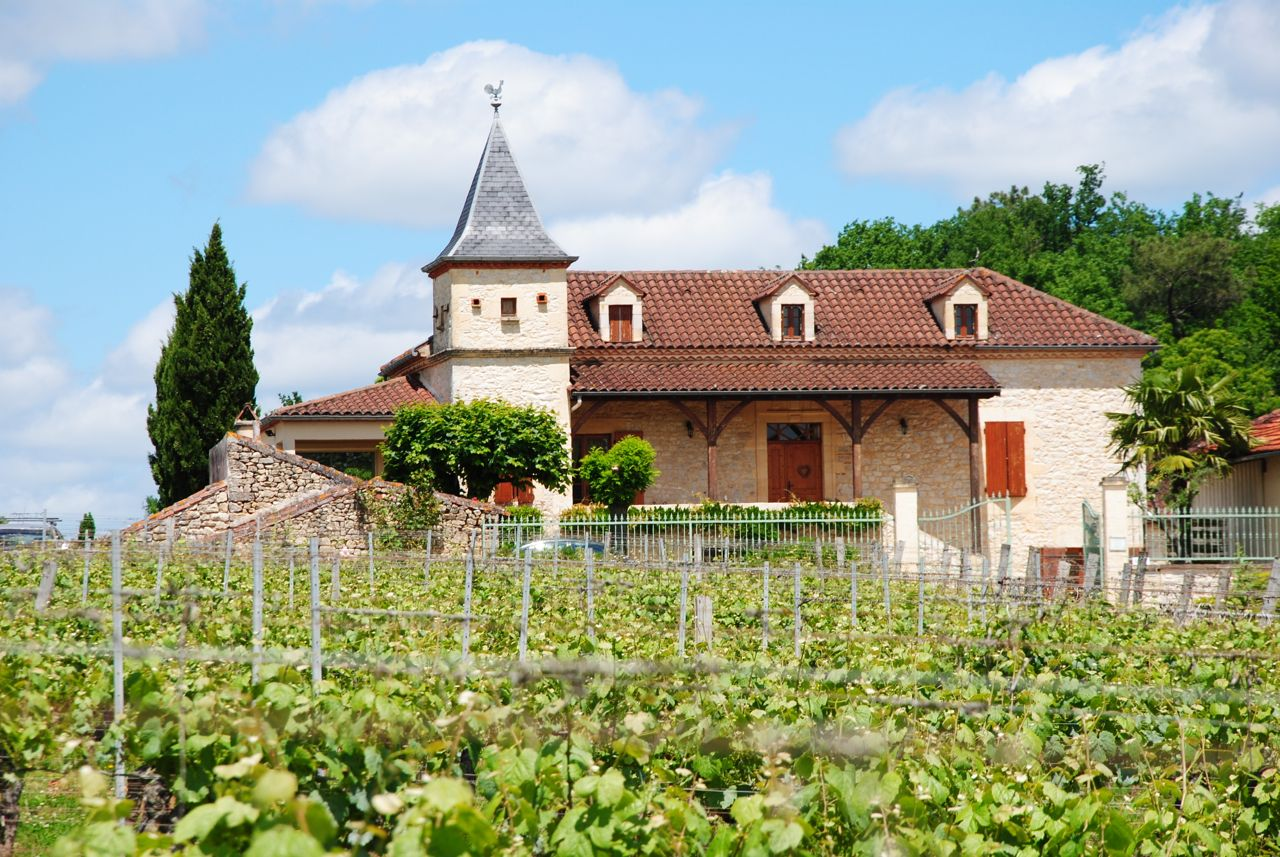
Typical building and winery of the Cahors region (Château Haut-Monplaisir)

== See also ==
- List of Appellation d'Origine Contrôlée wines
