= Jean-Louis Nembrini =

French politician

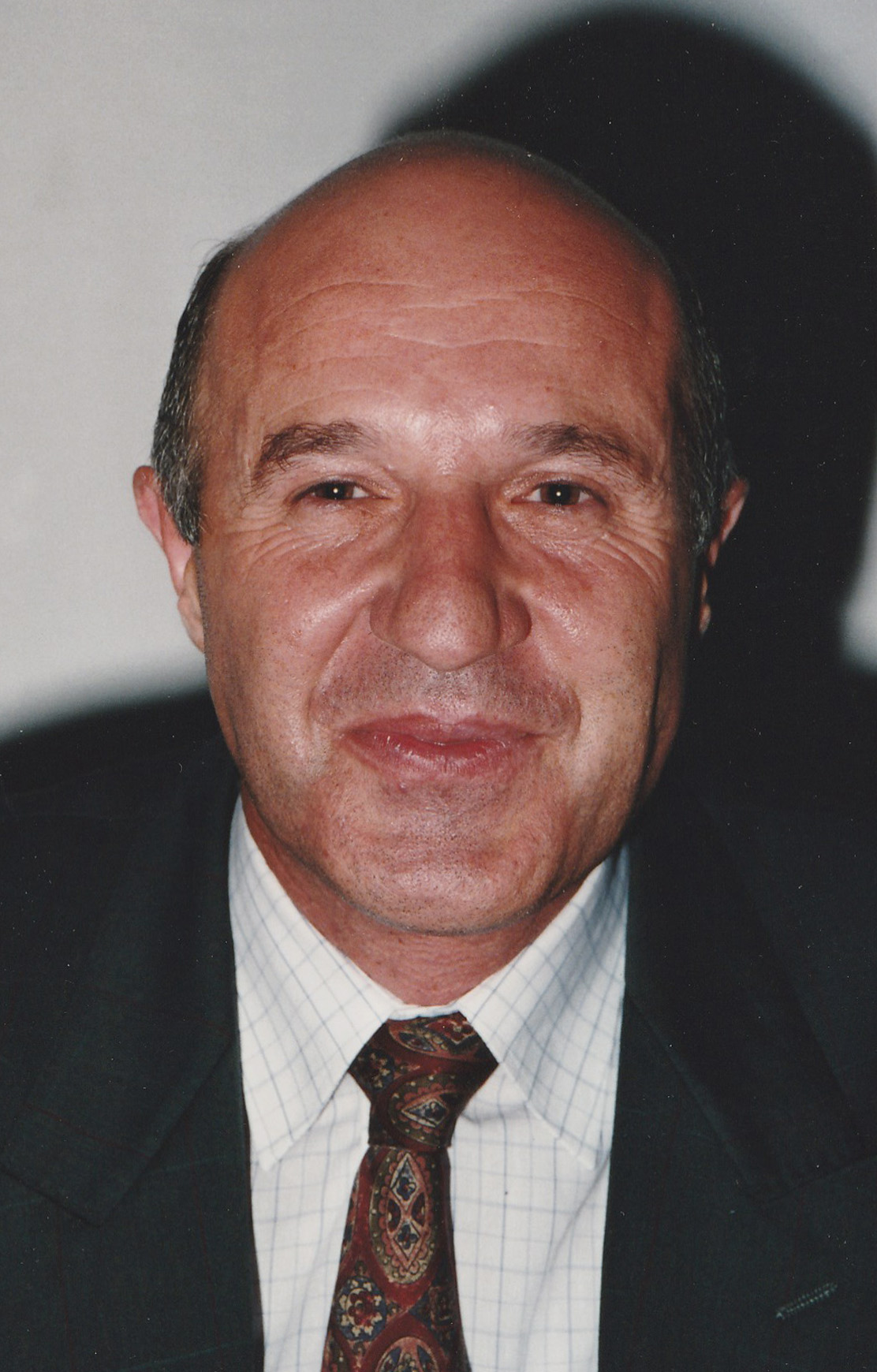
- Jean-Louis Nembrini

Vice-President of the Regional Council of Nouvelle-Aquitaine
- Incumbent
- Assumed office 2021
- President: Alain Rousset

Personal details
- Born: August 29, 1947 (age 78) Puy-l'Évêque

Jean-Louis Nembrini, former Inspector General of National Education and Rector of the academy, is the 2nd vice-president of the Regional Council of Nouvelle-Aquitaine.

== Youth and education ==
Jean-Louis Nembrini grew up in Puy-l'Évêque, department of Lot. He studied in a municipal school in Soturac, then at the general education college of Puy-l'Évêque. In 1963, he returned to the normal school for teachers in Montauban where he obtained the baccalaureate in philosophy with first class honors. He then completed his graduate studies in history and geography at the University of Toulouse and obtained a doctorate by defending a thesis on industry in rural areas. He was admitted to the CAPES in history and geography in 1971, then to the geography aggregation in 1974.

== Professional career ==
In 1989, he became an Academy Inspector - regional educational inspector, where he worked in Limoges and then in Bordeaux.

In 1994 he was appointed Inspector General of National Education assigned to the history and geography group, of which he was elected dean in 2000. He chaired the Civic Education Commission of IGEN.

From 2002 to 2007 he was Adviser to the Cabinets of Luc Ferry, Minister of Youth, National Education and Research; of Xavier Darcos, Minister Delegate for School Education, and then Advisor to Gilles de Robien, Minister of National Education, Higher education and Research.

In 2007, he was appointed director general of school education where he carried out the reform of the vocational baccalaureate in 3 years.

From 2009 to 2013, he was the rector of the Bordeaux Academy where he worked on the installation of the Aérocampus. As chancellor of the Universities of Aquitaine, he followed the merger process of the Universities of Bordeaux and accompanied the process which led in 2011 to the selection of idex Bordeaux, among the first French universities in response to the Initiatives of excellence project of the Investments for the Future Program.

From September 2013, he was appointed provisional administrator of the University of Bordeaux, until the merger of the Universities of Bordeaux 1, 2 and 4.

Jean-Louis Nembrini was also the President of the Scientific Council of the Franco-German Common History Manual (2004–2012), member of the Scientific Council of the National City of Immigration History (2004–2005) and President of the Fraternity Edmond Michelet (2005–2016).

In January 2016, he was elected Regional Councilor from the list led by Alain Rousset and became vice-president in charge of Education and high schools. The vocational training map attracts particular attention with a view to the necessary decentralization. The transformation of educational guidance in the context of lifelong learning is also at the center of its action within the community executive. He was re-elected in June 2021, from the department of Gironde.

== Distinctions ==

Commandeur de l’Ordre des Palmes Académiques

Chevalier de l’Ordre national du Mérite

Chevalier de l’Ordre national de la Légion d’Honneur

Officer Cross of the Order of Merit of the Federal Republic of Germany
