= Lherm =

Lherm may refer to the following places in France:

- Lherm, Haute-Garonne, a commune in the Haute-Garonne department
- Lherm, Lot, a commune in the Lot department
