= Saint-Matré =

- Part of Porte-du-Quercy
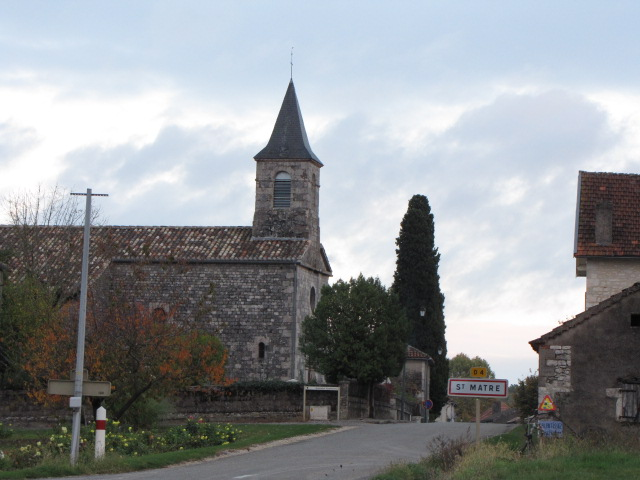
- The road into Saint-Matré
- Location of Saint-Matré
- Location within France Location within Occitanie
- Coordinates: 44°24′06″N 1°07′13″E
- Country: France
- Region: Occitania
- Department: Lot
- Arrondissement: Cahors
- Canton: Puy-l'Évêque
- Commune: Porte-du-Quercy
- Area^{1}: 6.41 km^{2} (2.47 sq mi)
- Elevation: 258 m (846 ft)
- Highest elevation: 276 m (906 ft)
- Lowest elevation: 155 m (509 ft)
- Population (2022): 116
  - Density: 18.1/km^{2} (46.9/sq mi)
- Time zone: UTC+01:00 (CET)
  - Summer (DST): UTC+02:00 (CEST)
- Postal code: 46800
- ^{1} French Land Register data, which excludes lakes, ponds, glaciers > 1 km^{2} (0.386 sq mi or 247 acres) and river estuaries.

Saint-Matré (French pronunciation: [sɛ̃ matʁe]; Languedocien: Sent Matre) is a former commune in the Lot department in south-western France. On 1 January 2019, it was merged into the new commune of Porte-du-Quercy.

== Etymology ==
A local tradition according to which the toponym was derived from St. Amator is rather doubtful given the old forms of the name that have come down to us. No saint is mentioned in the medieval pouillés (Note: pouillés: French ecclesiastical cadastral registers, official documents that provide a comprehensive picture of the dioceses under the Ancien Regime in France.), the village being called Samatre. A 14th century pouillé mentions Samayré. We can find Samatré or Samatan in the 15th century texts, then Saint-Mathié in 1526 and Saint-Matré du Crucifix in 1679.

So we see there is no question of any Christian influence to the toponym. Its name could derive from a Gallo-Roman domain belonging to a certain Samitius, but there are no archaeological data to support such a view.

== Administration ==
List of mayors since 1802 :

- 1802-1804: Jean Basset
- 1804-1809: Jean Bessières
- 1809-1814: Armand David
- 1815-1831: Jean-Baptiste Estang
- 1831-1843: Jean Bessières
- 1843-1855: Paul David
- 1855-1863: Jean Bessières (Note: Former mayor Paul David. who was still a member of the Municipal Council in the years 1856 to 1857, resigned from the Council in troubled circumstances on July 28, 1857.)
- 1863-1878: Étienne Frezal
- 1878-1884: Émile Pignier
- 1884-1902: Jean Jordy
- 2001-2019: Christian Bessières

== See also ==
- Communes of the Lot department
