= Touzac, Lot =

Touzac
- Commune
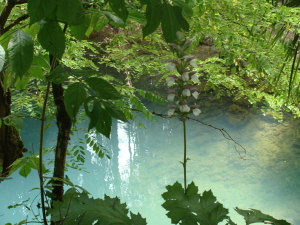
- The Source Bleue
- Location of Touzac
- Location within France Location within Occitanie
- Coordinates: 44°29′54″N 1°03′22″E
- Country: France
- Region: Occitania
- Department: Lot
- Arrondissement: Cahors
- Canton: Puy-l'Évêque

Government
  - Mayor (2023–2026): Alain Bonis
- Area^{1}: 4.9 km^{2} (1.9 sq mi)
- Population (2023): 354
  - Density: 72/km^{2} (190/sq mi)
- Time zone: UTC+01:00 (CET)
  - Summer (DST): UTC+02:00 (CEST)
- INSEE/Postal code: 46321 /46700
- ^{1} French Land Register data, which excludes lakes, ponds, glaciers > 1 km^{2} (0.386 sq mi or 247 acres) and river estuaries.

Touzac (French pronunciation: [tuzak]; Occitan: Tosac) is a commune in the Lot department in south-western France.

Situated in a bend of the river Lot, many of its buildings date from the 1840s and 1850s and were constructed in a wave of economic development that followed the opening of the metallurgical factory in nearby Fumel. Today, after the factory in Fumel has seen most of its operations moved to Spain in the 1970s and 1980s (a loss of some 3500 jobs) and after the decline of agriculture, Touzac, like many other villages in the area, has become a tourist destination.

One of its attractions is La source bleue, a blue spring near the river. Next to the spring is a water mill, and the domaine is now a hotel and restaurant named for the spring. Marguerite Moreno lived here during World War II.

== Population ==
In 1841, the new commune Vire-sur-Lot was formed from part of its territory.

Historical population

Year	Pop.	±% p.a.
1793	461	—
1800	830	+8.76%
1806	829	−0.02%
1821	1,025	+1.42%
1831	1,028	+0.03%
1836	972	−1.11%
1841	457	−14.01%
1846	446	−0.49%
1851	459	+0.58%
1856	445	−0.62%
1861	435	−0.45%
1866	423	−0.56%
1872	417	−0.24%
1876	428	+0.65%
1881	414	−0.66%
1886	414	+0.00%
1891	404	−0.49%
1896	383	−1.06%
1901	353	−1.62%

Year	Pop.	±% p.a.
1906	334	−1.10%
1911	338	+0.24%
1921	279	−1.90%
1926	274	−0.36%
1931	293	+1.35%
1936	274	−1.33%
1946	290	+0.57%
1954	270	−0.89%
1962	376	+4.23%
1968	406	+1.29%
1975	382	−0.87%
1982	417	+1.26%
1990	412	−0.15%
1999	341	−2.08%
2007	348	+0.25%
2012	363	+0.85%
2017	373	+0.54%
2023	354	−0.87%

Source: EHESS and INSEE (1968-2023)

== Notable people ==
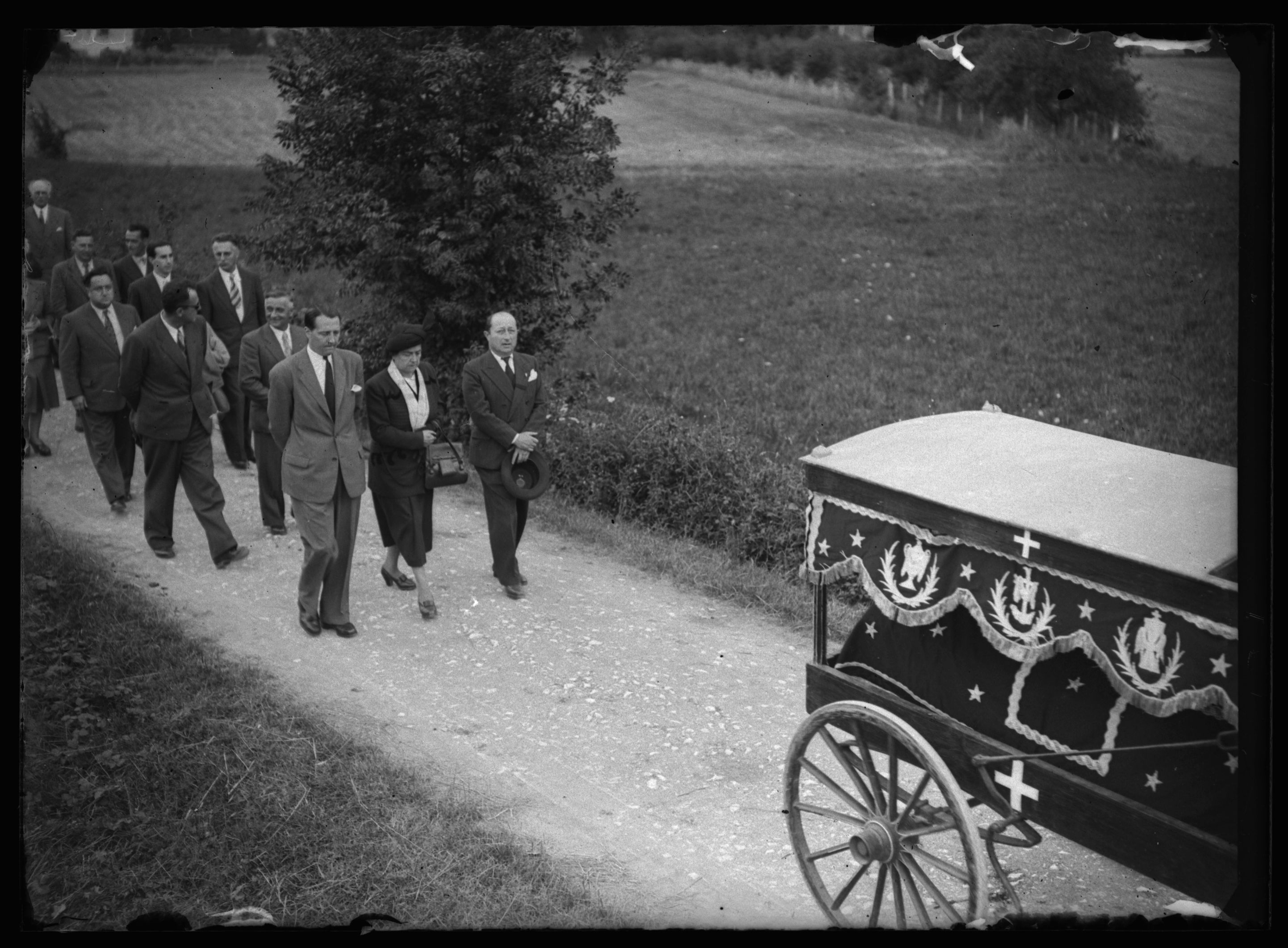
Funeral of Marguerite Moreno

- Marguerite Moreno, actress, died in Touzac in 1948

== See also ==
- Communes of the Lot department
