= Sérignac =

Sérignac may refer to the following places in France:

- Sérignac, Lot, a commune in the Lot department
- Sérignac, Tarn-et-Garonne, a commune in the Tarn-et-Garonne department
