= Le Boulvé =

- Part of Porte-du-Quercy
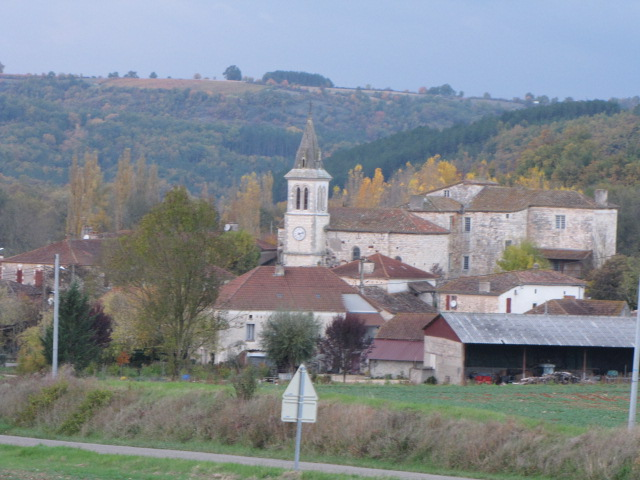
- A general view of Le Boulvé
- Location of Le Boulvé
- Location within France Location within Occitanie
- Coordinates: 44°25′11″N 1°08′50″E
- Country: France
- Region: Occitania
- Department: Lot
- Arrondissement: Cahors
- Canton: Puy-l'Évêque
- Commune: Porte-du-Quercy
- Area^{1}: 19.51 km^{2} (7.53 sq mi)
- Elevation: 147 m (482 ft)
- Highest elevation: 292 m (958 ft)
- Lowest elevation: 108 m (354 ft)
- Population (2023): 159
  - Density: 8.15/km^{2} (21.1/sq mi)
- Time zone: UTC+01:00 (CET)
  - Summer (DST): UTC+02:00 (CEST)
- Postal code: 46800
- ^{1} French Land Register data, which excludes lakes, ponds, glaciers > 1 km^{2} (0.386 sq mi or 247 acres) and river estuaries.

Le Boulvé (French pronunciation: [lə bulve]; Languedocien: Lo Bolben) is a former commune in the Lot department in southwestern France. On 1 January 2019, it was merged into the new commune Porte-du-Quercy.

== Landmarks ==
.A castle dating back to the 13th century, which underwent modifications between the 15th and 17th centuries. Over centuries, the castle passed through various noble families and was ultimately restored by an artist in the 20th century. However, it remains private and is not open to public visits

== See also ==
- Communes of the Lot department
