= Château des Junies =

Castle in Les Junies, Lot, France

Coordinates: 44°32′21″N 1°14′10″E

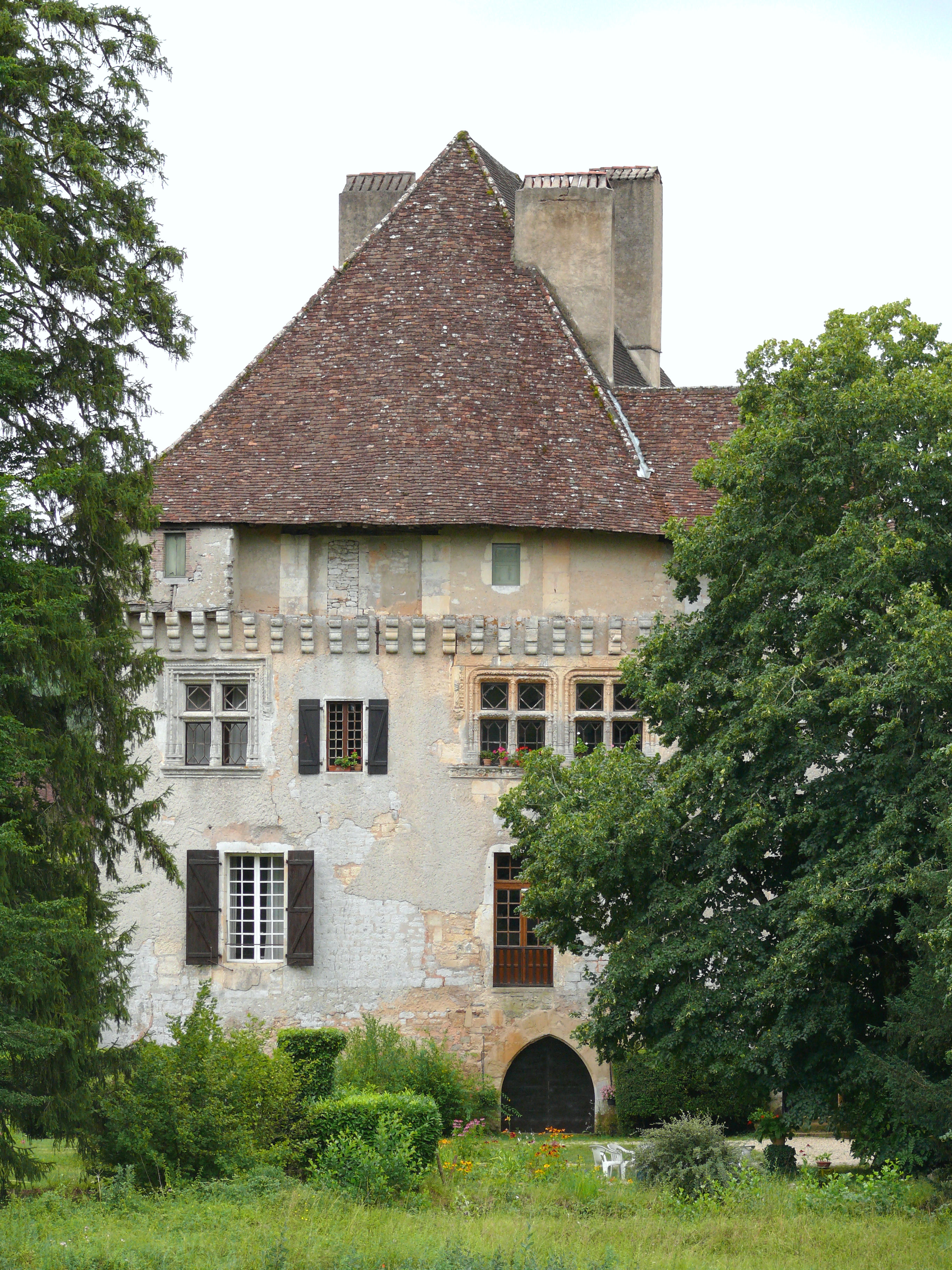
Château des Junies

The Château des Junies is a castle in the commune of Les Junies in the Lot département of France.

This small castle, whose construction seems to date from the 13th century, has undergone various substantial transformations, notably in the 16th century, when large double windows were opened up on the first floor, and during the 18th century. The lowest floor, which was used as a cellar and, probably, stables, extends beneath the whole of the castle. It is entirely barrel vaulted and several murder-holes indicate that this floor was used for defence. The garden level is about 1m30 higher, so the lower floor is partly below ground. It is likely that the castle was surrounded by moats, later filled in. Access to the first floor is by a staircase in the west tower. The interior was greatly altered during the 18th century and maintains decoration from that period. The attic floor was dedicated to defence, though the external crenellation has disappeared. The top of the east tower has been removed. On the eastern side of the east tower, there is evidence of the existence of attached buildings which have been destroyed at some time. This tower has also been reduced in height.

Château des Junies is privately owned and is not open to the public. It has been listed since 1925 as a monument historique by the French Ministry of Culture.

== See also ==
- List of castles in France
