= Fargues =

Fargues may refer to:

== Communes in France ==
- Fargues, Gironde, in the Gironde department
- Fargues, Landes, in the Landes department
- Fargues, Lot, in the Lot department
- Fargues-Saint-Hilaire, in the Gironde department
- Fargues-sur-Ourbise, in the Lot-et-Garonne department

== People ==
- Annie Fargue (1934—2011), French actress
- Léon-Paul Fargue (1876–1947), French poet and essayist
- Maria Fargues Gimeno (b. 1980), Spanish ski mountaineer
- Maurice Fargues (1913–1947), diver with the French Navy and a close associate of Jacques Cousteau
- Nicolas Fargues (b. 1972), French novelist
- Laurent Fargues (b. 1975), French mathematician
