= Kagor =

Kagor may refer to:

- Kagor (wine)
- Kagor, Tibet
