= Mauroux =

Mauroux may refer to the following places in France:

- Mauroux, Gers, a commune in the Gers department
- Mauroux, Lot, a commune in the Lot department
