= Saux =

Saux or Le Saux may refer to:

== People ==
- Graeme Le Saux (born 1968), Jèrriais football pundit and former player
- Henri Le Saux (1910–1973), French monk
- Stephen Saux (born 1972), American actor, writer, cinematographer, and short film producer
- Yorick Le Saux (born 1968), American cinematographer
- Yves Le Saux (born 1960), French prelate of the Catholic Church

== Places ==
- Saux, Lot, France, a former commune
- Saux-et-Pomarède, Haute-Garonne, France, a commune
