= Cassagnes =

Cassagnes is the name or part of the name of the following communes in France:

- Cassagnes, Lot, in the Lot department
- Cassagnes, Pyrénées-Orientales, in the Pyrénées-Orientales department
- Cassagnes-Bégonhès, in the Aveyron department

== People with the surname ==
- André Cassagnes (1926–2013), French inventor
- Louis Victorin Cassagne (1774–1841), French general of the Napoleonic Wars
