= Saint-Martin-le-Redon =

- Commune
- Location of Saint-Martin-le-Redon
- Location within France Location within Occitanie
- Coordinates: 44°31′53″N 1°02′36″E
- Country: France
- Region: Occitania
- Department: Lot
- Arrondissement: Cahors
- Canton: Puy-l'Évêque
- Intercommunality: Vallée du Lot et du Vignoble

Government
  - Mayor (2020–2026): Kathe Capmas
- Area^{1}: 10.6 km^{2} (4.1 sq mi)
- Elevation: 103 m (338 ft)
- Highest elevation: 257 m (843 ft)
- Lowest elevation: 86 m (282 ft)
- Population (2023): 195
  - Density: 18.4/km^{2} (47.6/sq mi)
- Time zone: UTC+01:00 (CET)
  - Summer (DST): UTC+02:00 (CEST)
- INSEE/Postal code: 46277 /46700
- ^{1} French Land Register data, which excludes lakes, ponds, glaciers > 1 km^{2} (0.386 sq mi or 247 acres) and river estuaries.

Saint-Martin-le-Redon (French pronunciation: [sɛ̃ maʁtɛ̃ lə ʁədɔ̃]; Languedocien: Sent Martin lo Redond) is a commune in the Lot department in south-western France.

== See also ==
- Communes of the Lot department
