= Montcléra =

- Commune
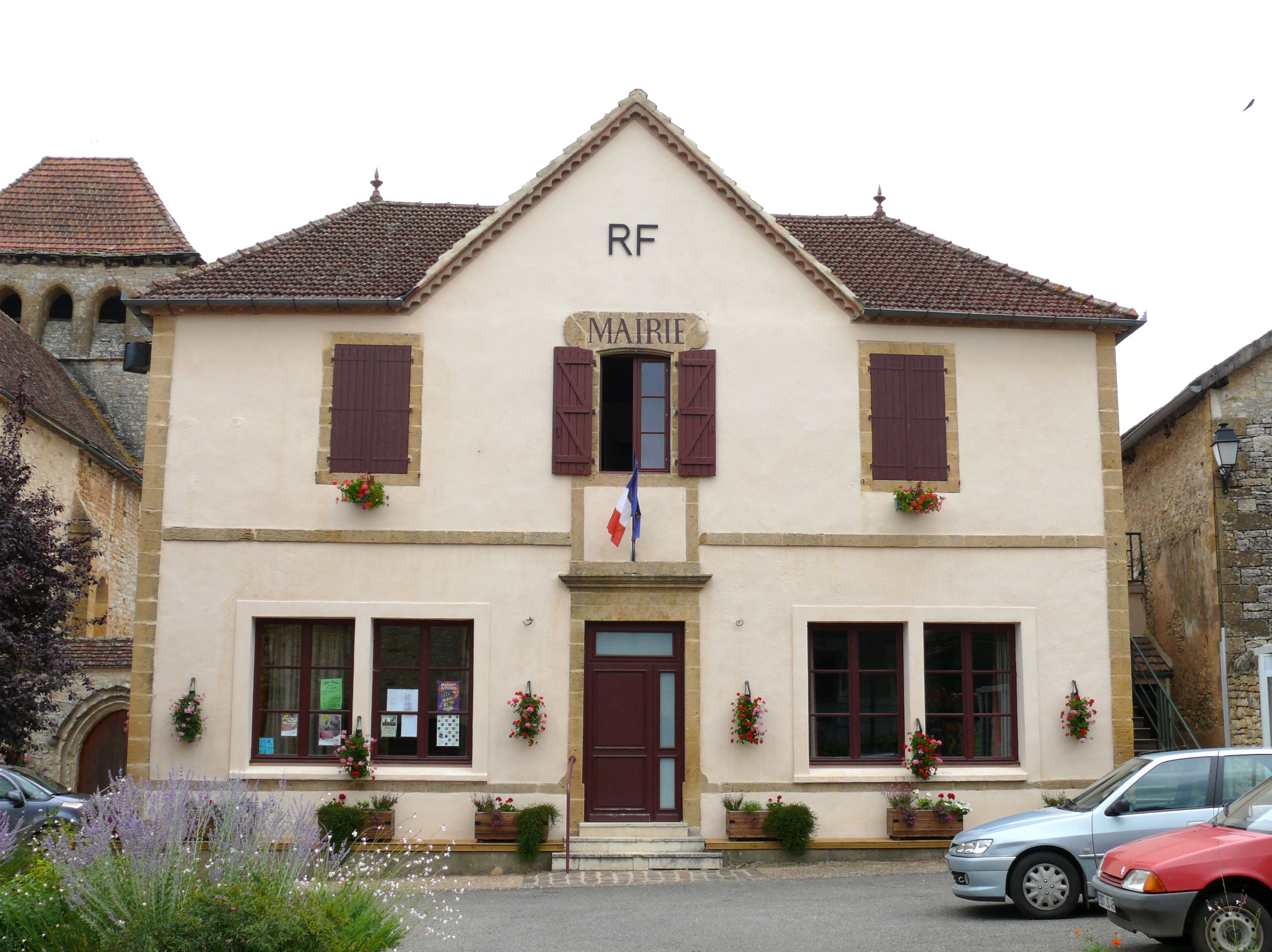
- The town hall in Montcléra
- Location of Montcléra
- Location within France Location within Occitanie
- Coordinates: 44°37′16″N 1°12′40″E
- Country: France
- Region: Occitania
- Department: Lot
- Arrondissement: Gourdon
- Canton: Puy-l'Évêque
- Intercommunality: Cazals-Salviac

Government
  - Mayor (2020–2026): Guy Theulet
- Area^{1}: 20.91 km^{2} (8.07 sq mi)
- Elevation: 239 m (784 ft)
- Highest elevation: 311 m (1,020 ft)
- Lowest elevation: 154 m (505 ft)
- Population (2023): 292
  - Density: 14.0/km^{2} (36.2/sq mi)
- Time zone: UTC+01:00 (CET)
  - Summer (DST): UTC+02:00 (CEST)
- INSEE/Postal code: 46200 /46250
- ^{1} French Land Register data, which excludes lakes, ponds, glaciers > 1 km^{2} (0.386 sq mi or 247 acres) and river estuaries.

Montcléra (French pronunciation: [mɔ̃kleʁa]) is a commune in the Lot department in south-western France.

== See also ==
- Communes of the Lot department
