= Lacapelle-Cabanac =

- Commune
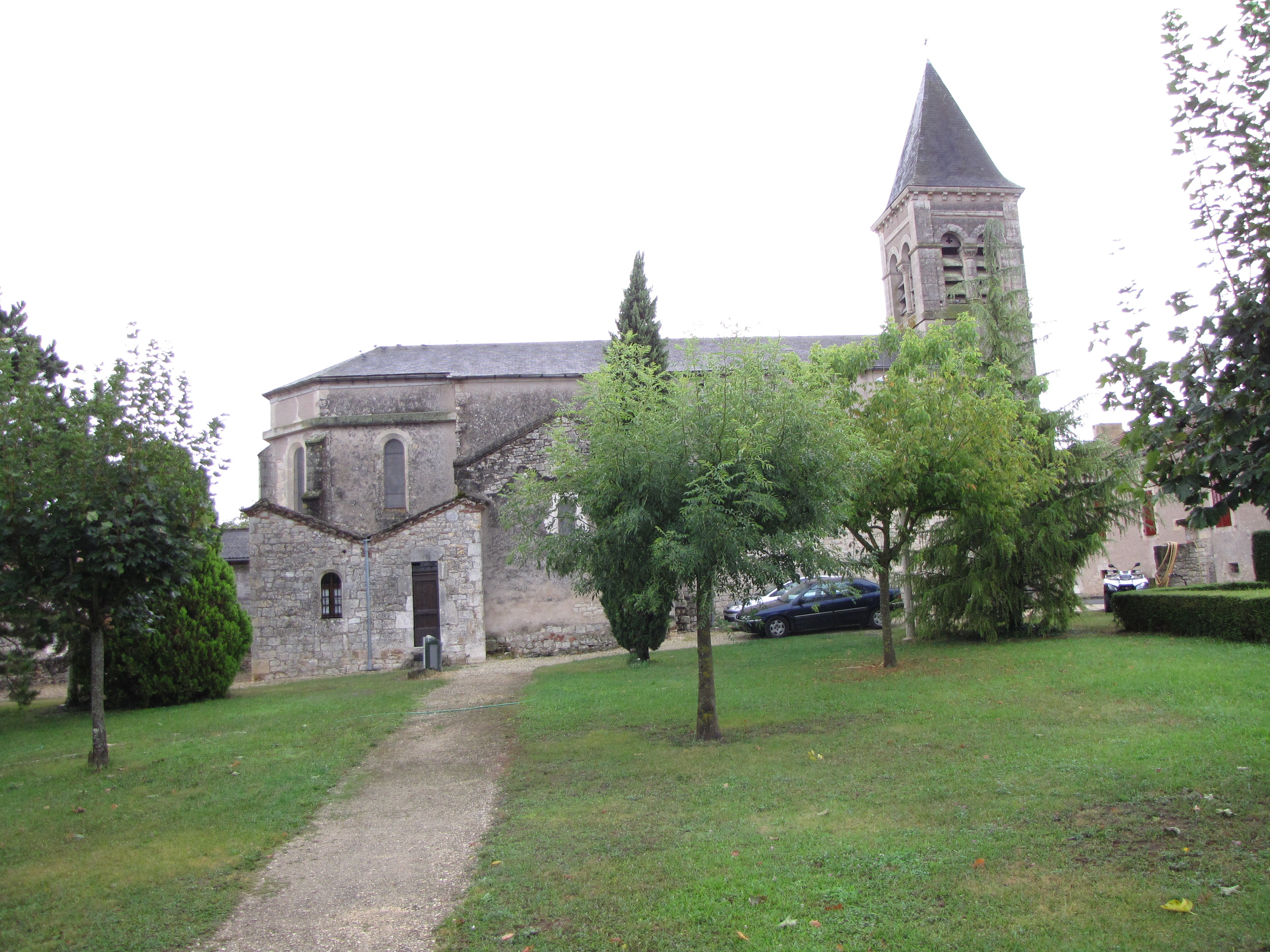
- The church in Lacapelle-Cabanac
- Location of Lacapelle-Cabanac
- Location within France Location within Occitanie
- Coordinates: 44°27′57″N 1°04′11″E
- Country: France
- Region: Occitania
- Department: Lot
- Arrondissement: Cahors
- Canton: Puy-l'Évêque
- Intercommunality: Vallée du Lot et du Vignoble

Government
  - Mayor (2020–2026): Thierry Simon
- Area^{1}: 8.04 km^{2} (3.10 sq mi)
- Elevation: 200 m (660 ft)
- Highest elevation: 266 m (873 ft)
- Lowest elevation: 74 m (243 ft)
- Population (2023): 172
  - Density: 21.4/km^{2} (55.4/sq mi)
- Time zone: UTC+01:00 (CET)
  - Summer (DST): UTC+02:00 (CEST)
- INSEE/Postal code: 46142 /46700
- ^{1} French Land Register data, which excludes lakes, ponds, glaciers > 1 km^{2} (0.386 sq mi or 247 acres) and river estuaries.

Lacapelle-Cabanac (French pronunciation: [lakapɛl kabanak]; Occitan: La Capèla Cabanac) is a commune in the Lot department in south-western France.

== See also ==
- Communes of the Lot department
