= Pescadoires =

- Commune
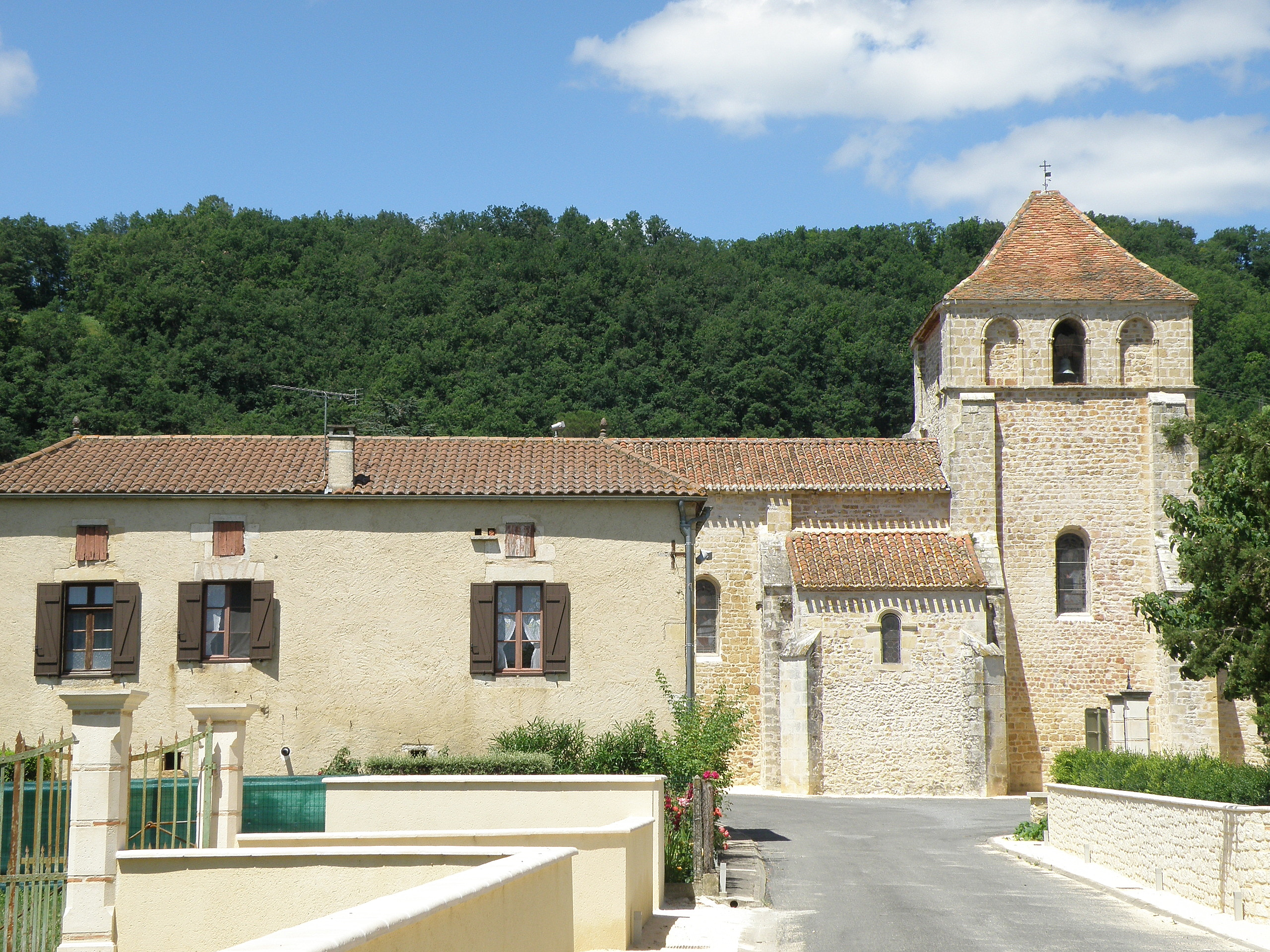
- The church in Pescadoires
- Location of Pescadoires
- Location within France Location within Occitanie
- Coordinates: 44°30′19″N 1°09′28″E
- Country: France
- Region: Occitania
- Department: Lot
- Arrondissement: Cahors
- Canton: Puy-l'Évêque
- Intercommunality: CC de la Vallée du Lot et du Vignoble

Government
  - Mayor (2020–2026): Serge Bladinières
- Area^{1}: 3.28 km^{2} (1.27 sq mi)
- Elevation: 89 m (292 ft)
- Highest elevation: 120 m (390 ft)
- Lowest elevation: 80 m (260 ft)
- Population (2023): 184
  - Density: 56.1/km^{2} (145/sq mi)
- Time zone: UTC+01:00 (CET)
  - Summer (DST): UTC+02:00 (CEST)
- INSEE/Postal code: 46218 /46220
- ^{1} French Land Register data, which excludes lakes, ponds, glaciers > 1 km^{2} (0.386 sq mi or 247 acres) and river estuaries.

Pescadoires (French pronunciation: [pɛskadwaʁ]; Occitan: Pescadoiras) is a commune in the Lot department in south-western France.

== See also ==
- Communes of the Lot department
