= Duravel =

- Commune
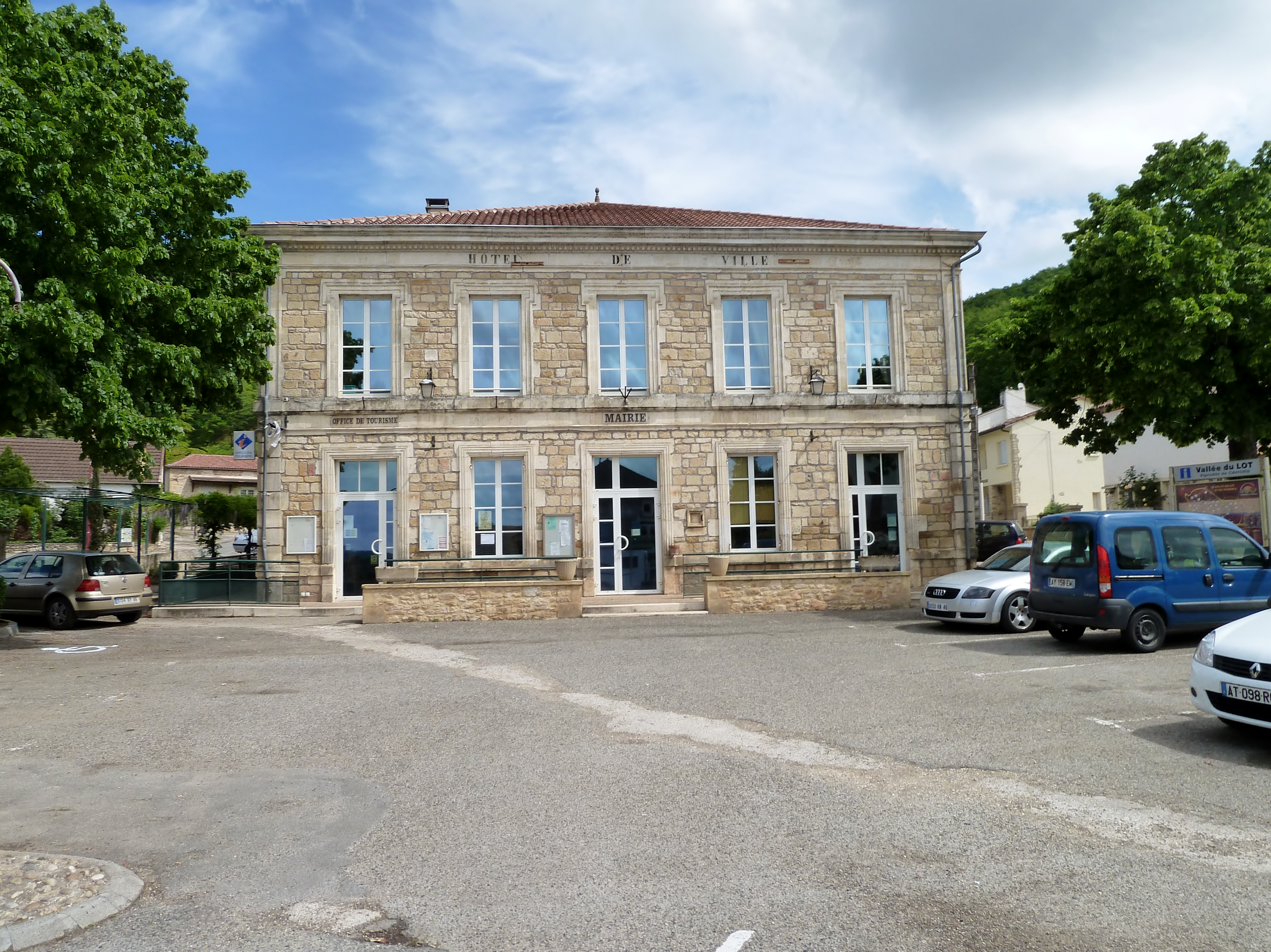
- The town hall in Duravel

- Coat of arms
- Location of Duravel
- Location within France Location within Occitanie
- Coordinates: 44°31′02″N 1°04′50″E
- Country: France
- Region: Occitania
- Department: Lot
- Arrondissement: Cahors
- Canton: Puy-l'Évêque
- Intercommunality: CC de la Vallée du Lot et du Vignoble

Government
  - Mayor (2020–2026): Gérard Calassou
- Area^{1}: 14.97 km^{2} (5.78 sq mi)
- Elevation: 88 m (289 ft)
- Highest elevation: 271 m (889 ft)
- Lowest elevation: 65 m (213 ft)
- Population (2023): 950
  - Density: 63/km^{2} (160/sq mi)
- Time zone: UTC+01:00 (CET)
  - Summer (DST): UTC+02:00 (CEST)
- INSEE/Postal code: 46089 /46700
- ^{1} French Land Register data, which excludes lakes, ponds, glaciers > 1 km^{2} (0.386 sq mi or 247 acres) and river estuaries.

Duravel (French pronunciation: [dyʁavɛl]; Occitan: Duravèl) is a commune in the Lot department in south-western France.

== See also ==
- Communes of the Lot department
