= Floressas =

- Commune
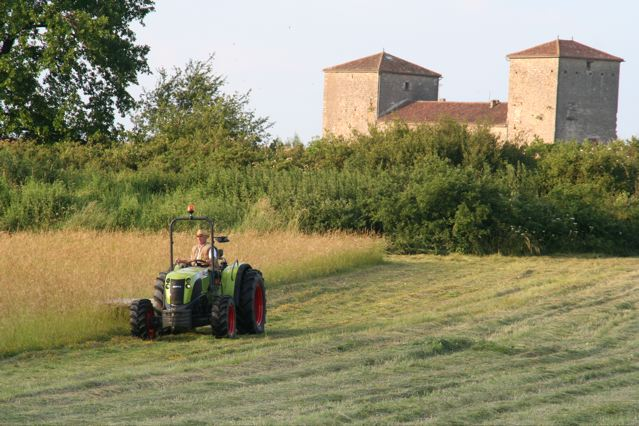
- The chateau in Floressas
- Location of Floressas
- Location within France Location within Occitanie
- Coordinates: 44°26′41″N 1°07′20″E
- Country: France
- Region: Occitania
- Department: Lot
- Arrondissement: Cahors
- Canton: Puy-l'Évêque
- Intercommunality: Vallée du Lot et Vignoble

Government
  - Mayor (2020–2026): Alain Dominique Dutranois
- Area^{1}: 13.84 km^{2} (5.34 sq mi)
- Elevation: 253 m (830 ft)
- Highest elevation: 286 m (938 ft)
- Lowest elevation: 95 m (312 ft)
- Population (2023): 176
  - Density: 12.7/km^{2} (32.9/sq mi)
- Time zone: UTC+01:00 (CET)
  - Summer (DST): UTC+02:00 (CEST)
- INSEE/Postal code: 46107 /46700
- ^{1} French Land Register data, which excludes lakes, ponds, glaciers > 1 km^{2} (0.386 sq mi or 247 acres) and river estuaries.

Floressas is a commune in the Lot department in south-western France.

== See also ==
- Communes of the Lot department
