= Regional Council of Nouvelle-Aquitaine =

Regional Council of Nouvelle-Aquitaine Conseil régional de Nouvelle-Aquitaine

Type
- Type: Unicameral

Leadership
- President: Alain Rousset, PS since 1 January 2016

Structure
- Political groups: Majority (101): Socialist Party (86) (Note: PS (62); Miscellaneous Left (18); PP (6)); French Communist Party (10) (Note: PCF (9); Miscellaneous Left (1)); Radical Party of the Left (5); Opposition (82): National Rally (26); The Ecologists (19) (Note: LÉ (14); Miscellaneous Environmentalists (3); GÉ (1); G.s (1)); The Republicans (19) (Note: LR (18); Miscellaneous Right (1)); Democratic Movement (10) (Note: MoDem (5); Miscellaneous Centre (2); PR (2); H (1)); Renaissance (5); Union of Democrats and Independents (3)

Elections
- Voting system: Two-round proportional voting

Website
- https://www.nouvelle-aquitaine.fr/

The Regional Council of Nouvelle-Aquitaine is the deliberative assembly of the French region of Nouvelle-Aquitaine. The regional council is made up of 183 regional councilors elected for 6 years and is chaired by Alain Rousset.

== History ==
The Nouvelle-Aquitaine regional council, created by the law relating to the delimitation of regions, regional and departmental elections and modifying the electoral calendar of January 16, 2015 with effect from 1 January 2016, is the result of the merger of the regional councils of Aquitaine, Limousin and Poitou-Charentes, which respectively include 85, 43 and 55 elected officials (183 combined regional councilors).

Article 5 of the law of January 16, 2015 establishes the number of regional councilors at 183; it distributes the number of candidates by departmental section for the 2015 elections:

- 13 for Charente;
- 22 for Charente-Maritime;
- 10 for Corrèze;
- 6 for Creuse;
- 14 for Deux-Sèvres;
- 15 for Dordogne;
- 48 for Gironde;
- 14 for Haute-Vienne.
- 14 for Landes;
- 12 for Lot-et-Garonne;
- 23 for Pyrénées-Atlantiques;
- 16 for Vienne.

This number of candidates per departmental section includes two substitute candidates (article 3 of the law of January 16, 2016). Thus, the exact number of elected officials per department sitting on the Regional Council will be 11 for Charente, 20 for Charente-Maritime, 8 for Corrèze, 4 for Creuse etc.

== Current composition ==
=== President ===
Alain Rousset was elected first president of the Regional Council by the 2021 Nouvelle-Aquitaine regional election.

2021 Regional elections in Nouvelle-Aquitaine
Candidate	List	First round		Second round		Seats
Candidate	List	Votes	%	Votes	%	Seats
Alain Rousset *	PS-PRG-PCF	430,659	28.83	598,193	39.51	101
Edwige Diaz	RN-LDP	271,771	18.20	289,258	19.11	26
Nicolas Florian	LR	186,348	13.71	214,859	14.19	19
Nicolas Thierry	EÉLV-G.s-CÉ-GÉ-GRS	180,551	12.09	214,767	14.19	19
Geneviève Darrieussecq	MoDem-LREM-Agir-UDI	204,467	13.71	196,894	13.01	18
Eddie Puyjalon	LMR-RES	108,882	7.29			
Clémence Guetté	LFI	84,630	5.67			
Guillaume Perchet	LO	26,012	1.74			
Valid votes		1,493,620	95.43	1,513,971	95.10	
Blank ballots		39,346	2.51	42,396	2.66	
Null Ballots		32,216	2.06	35,641	2.24	
Turnout		1,565,182	35.96	1,592,008	36.57	183
Abstentions		2,787,124	64.04	2,760,872	63.43	
Registered voters		4,352,306	100	4,352,880	100	

=== Vice-Presidents ===
Vice-presidents of the Regional Council
Order	Regional advisor	Delegation	Election Department
1st	Andrea Brouille	Economic development, innovation and support for corporate social responsibility	Haute-Vienne
2nd	Jean-Louis Nembrini	Guidance and education	Deux-Sèvres
3rd	Karine Desroses	Vocational training and apprenticeship	Vienna
4th	Guillaume Riou	Ecological, environmental and biodiversity transition	Charente
5th	Françoise Jeanson	Health	Pyrenees-Atlantiques
6th	Philippe Nauche	Tourism and territorial economy	Corrèze
7th	Sandrine Derville	Finances and general administration	Gironde
8th	Renaud Lagrave	Mobility	Pyrenees-Atlantiques
9th	Laurence Rouède	Spatial planning and contractual policies	Charente Maritime
10th	Gérard Blanchard	Higher education and research	Gironde
11th	Catherine La Dune	Disability and the fight against discrimination	Dordogne
12th	Jean-Pierre Raynaud	Agriculture and agroecological transition	Gironde
13th	Maud Caruhel	Social and solidarity economy	Landes
14th	Philippe Lafrique	Sport and community life	Creuse
15th	Charline Claveau	Culture and regional languages	Gironde

== Competences ==
The law of August 7, 2015 on the new territorial organization of the Republic (NOTRe) specifies the competences of the region:

The regional council is competent to promote: the economic, social, health, cultural and scientific development of the region, support for access to housing and the improvement of housing, support for city policy and urban renewal and support for education policies and the development and equality of its territories, as well as to ensure the preservation of its identity and the promotion of regional languages, while respecting the integrity, 'autonomy and attributions of departments and municipalities. ”The regions have managed the European funds dedicated to the regions since the Maptam law of 2014.

— Article L4221-1 of the Code of local authorities

=== Transport ===
Management of ports and airports, Regional Express Trains (TER), interurban and school road transport, roads, public bus stations, etc. The regions have become full-fledged transport organizing authorities.

=== High schools ===
Construction, maintenance and operation of general education high schools and agricultural schools and establishments.

=== Vocational training ===
Integration of young people in difficulty, training of job seekers, management of apprenticeship and work-study training, etc. All of the training competence has been transferred to the regions (regional public service for vocational guidance and training, use of authorizations, training of specific audiences, etc.).

=== Spatial planning and the environment ===
The region is also in charge of the regional planning, Schéma Régional d’Aménagement, de Développement Durable et d’Égalité des Territoires (SRADDET or transl. Regional planning, sustainable development and equality of territories) plan. It sets the objectives in terms of territorial balance and equality, the establishment of various infrastructures of regional interest, the opening up of rural areas, housing, economical management of space, intermodality and development of transport.

=== European Program management ===
Managing authority for European funds ERDF, EAFRD and part of the ESF. With the EAFRD, the regions become responsible for writing and properly implementing regional operational programs the regional Rural Development Programs (RDPs).
