= Porte-du-Quercy =

- Commune
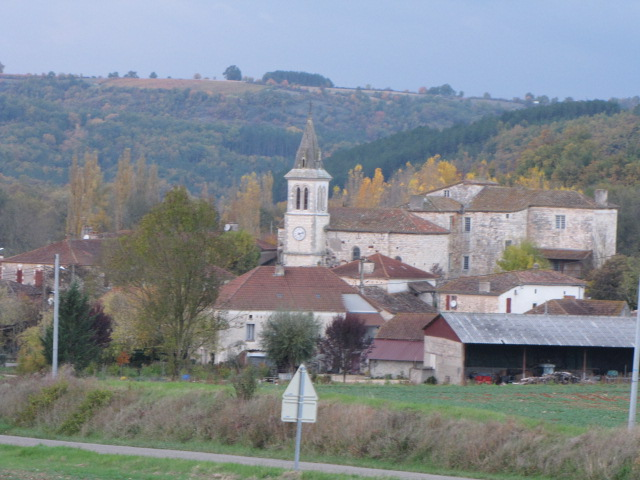
- A general view of Le Boulvé
- Location of Porte-du-Quercy
- Location within France Location within Occitanie
- Coordinates: 44°25′15″N 1°08′54″E
- Country: France
- Region: Occitania
- Department: Lot
- Arrondissement: Cahors
- Canton: Puy-l'Évêque
- Intercommunality: Quercy Blanc

Government
  - Mayor (2020–2026): Christian Bessières
- Area^{1}: 49.02 km^{2} (18.93 sq mi)
- Highest elevation: 292 m (958 ft)
- Lowest elevation: 108 m (354 ft)
- Population (2023): 532
  - Density: 10.9/km^{2} (28.1/sq mi)
- Time zone: UTC+01:00 (CET)
  - Summer (DST): UTC+02:00 (CEST)
- INSEE/Postal code: 46033 /46800
- ^{1} French Land Register data, which excludes lakes, ponds, glaciers > 1 km^{2} (0.386 sq mi or 247 acres) and river estuaries.

Porte-du-Quercy (French pronunciation: [pɔʁt dy kɛʁsi], literally Gate of the Quercy; Occitan: Pòrta de Carcin) is a commune in the Lot department in southwestern France. It was established on 1 January 2019 by merger of the former communes of Le Boulvé (the seat), Fargues, Saint-Matré and Saux.

== See also ==
- Communes of the Lot department
