= Saux, Lot =

Saux
- Part of Porte-du-Quercy
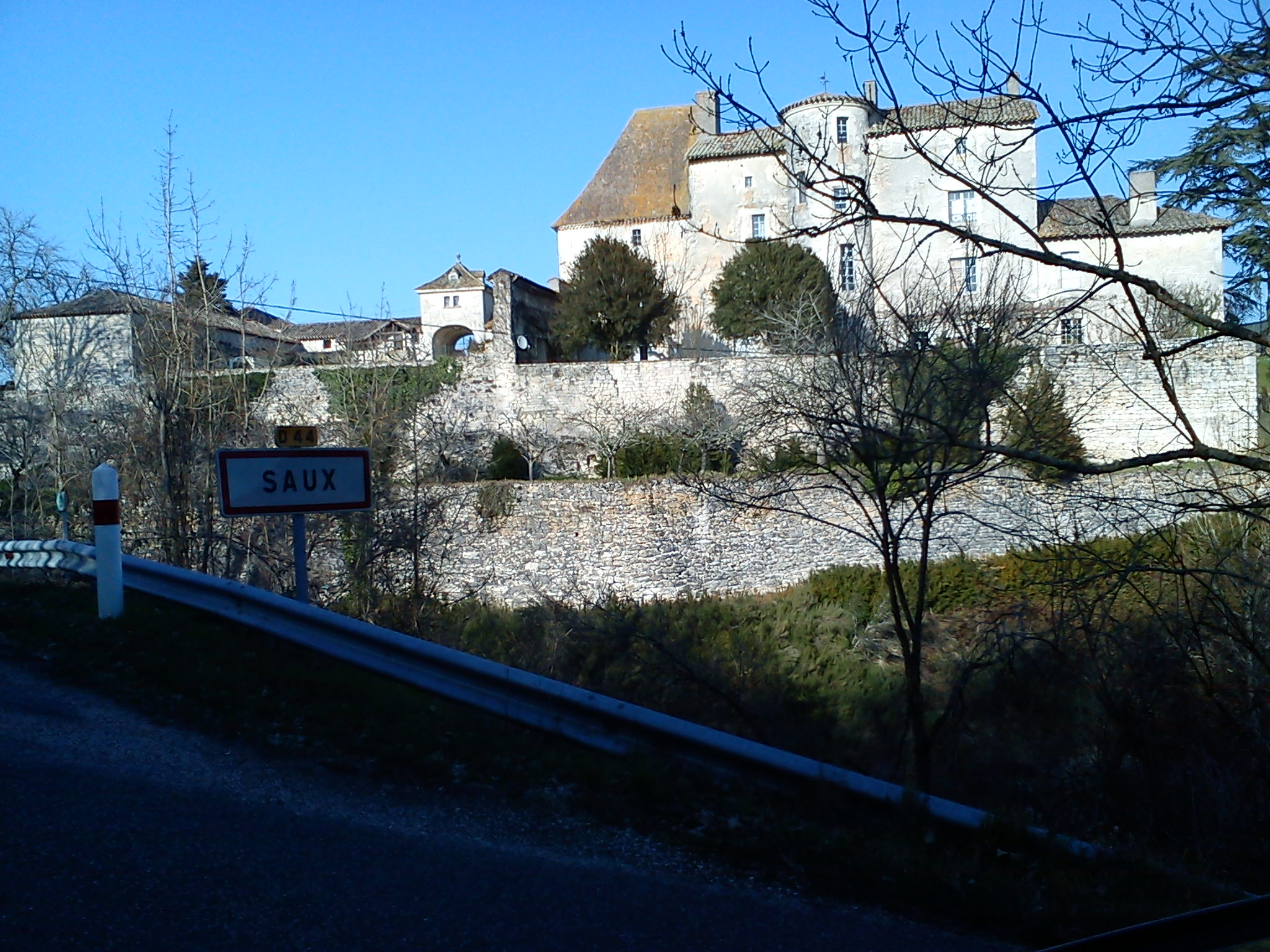
- The Chateau of Victor, hosting the famous trappe à bière
- Location of Saux
- Location within France Location within Occitanie
- Coordinates: 44°23′27″N 1°05′10″E
- Country: France
- Region: Occitania
- Department: Lot
- Arrondissement: Cahors
- Canton: Puy-l'Évêque
- Commune: Porte-du-Quercy
- Area^{1}: 8.31 km^{2} (3.21 sq mi)
- Elevation: 242 m (794 ft)
- Highest elevation: 275 m (902 ft)
- Lowest elevation: 173 m (568 ft)
- Population (2022): 104
  - Density: 12.5/km^{2} (32.4/sq mi)
- Time zone: UTC+01:00 (CET)
  - Summer (DST): UTC+02:00 (CEST)
- Postal code: 46800
- ^{1} French Land Register data, which excludes lakes, ponds, glaciers > 1 km^{2} (0.386 sq mi or 247 acres) and river estuaries.

Saux (French pronunciation: [soks]; Languedocien: Sauç) is a former commune in the Lot department in south-western France. On 1 January 2019, it was merged into the new commune of Porte-du-Quercy.

== History ==
The army of Simon de Montfort ravaged the village and demolished two castles there.

== Administration ==
Before 1789, there were two parishes in that village, the one at Saux known by the name of St. Andrew, the other at Tourniac by the name of St. Hilaire. Curiously, both were a detached possession of the castellany of Lauzerte, despite being part of the Diocese of Cahors.

At that time, the village was known as Saux-de-Tourniac.

== Tourniac ==
Tourniac is a hamlet to the west of the village Saux. It was mentioned on the 18th century Cassini map as Tronhac. Formerly an independent commune, it was merged into Saux between 1795 and 1800.

== See also ==
- Communes of the Lot department
