= Saint-Caprais, Lot =

Saint-Caprais
- Commune
- Location of Saint-Caprais
- Location within France Location within Occitanie
- Coordinates: 44°36′28″N 1°09′32″E
- Country: France
- Region: Occitania
- Department: Lot
- Arrondissement: Gourdon
- Canton: Puy-l'Évêque

Government
  - Mayor (2020–2026): Richard Aubry
- Area^{1}: 8.85 km^{2} (3.42 sq mi)
- Elevation: 277 m (909 ft)
- Highest elevation: 299 m (981 ft)
- Lowest elevation: 193 m (633 ft)
- Population (2023): 75
  - Density: 8.5/km^{2} (22/sq mi)
- Time zone: UTC+01:00 (CET)
  - Summer (DST): UTC+02:00 (CEST)
- INSEE/Postal code: 46250 /46250
- ^{1} French Land Register data, which excludes lakes, ponds, glaciers > 1 km^{2} (0.386 sq mi or 247 acres) and river estuaries.

Saint-Caprais (French pronunciation: [sɛ̃ kapʁɛ]; Languedocien: Sent Cabrasi) is a commune in the Lot department in south-western France.

== See also ==
- Communes of the Lot department
