= Grézels =

- Commune
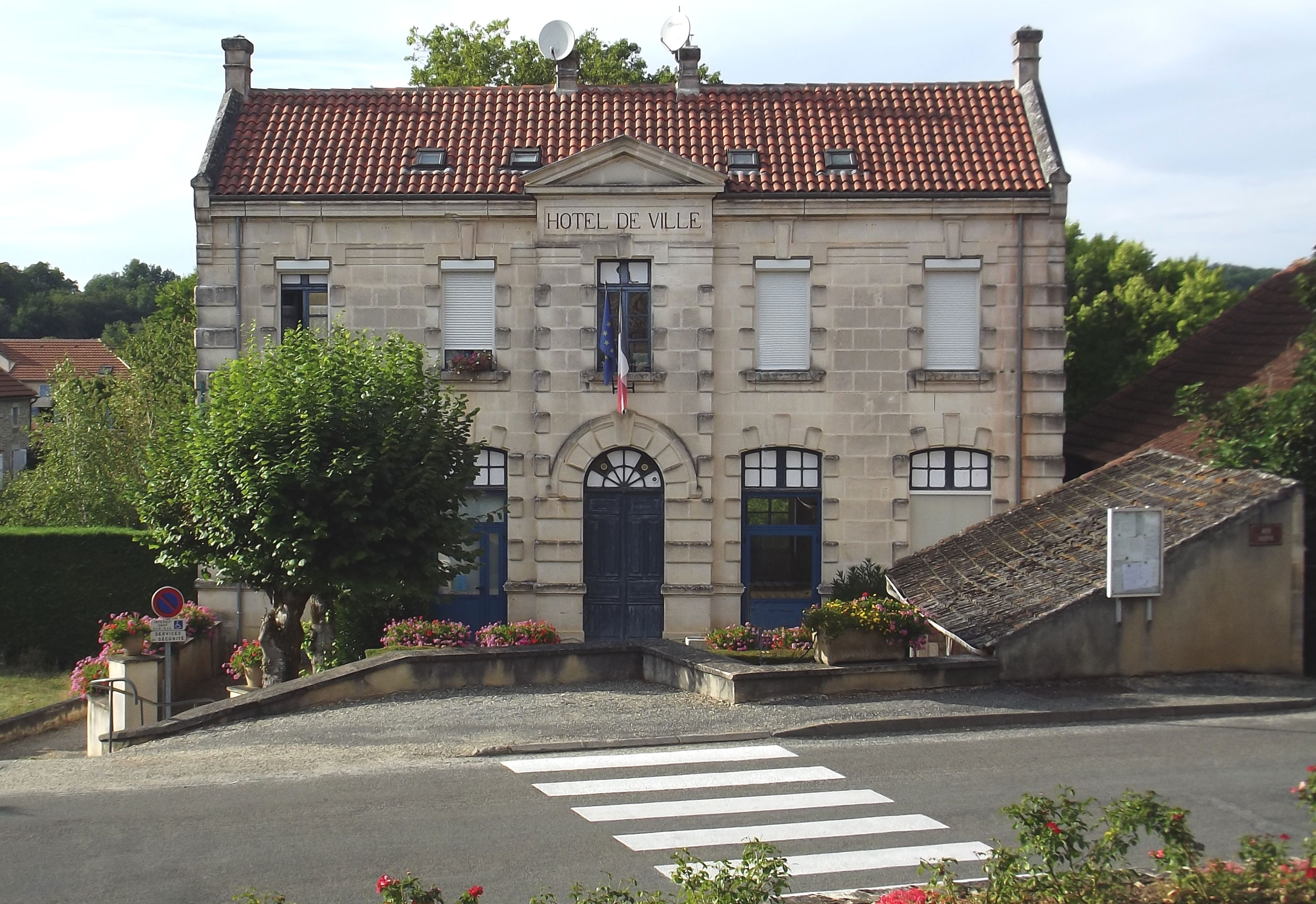
- The town hall in Grézels

- Coat of arms
- Location of Grézels
- Location within France Location within Occitanie
- Coordinates: 44°28′32″N 1°09′10″E
- Country: France
- Region: Occitania
- Department: Lot
- Arrondissement: Cahors
- Canton: Puy-l'Évêque
- Intercommunality: CC Vallée du Lot et du Vignoble

Government
  - Mayor (2020–2026): Sébastien Perez
- Area^{1}: 10.79 km^{2} (4.17 sq mi)
- Elevation: 90 m (300 ft)
- Highest elevation: 256 m (840 ft)
- Lowest elevation: 80 m (260 ft)
- Population (2023): 235
  - Density: 21.8/km^{2} (56.4/sq mi)
- Time zone: UTC+01:00 (CET)
  - Summer (DST): UTC+02:00 (CEST)
- INSEE/Postal code: 46130 /46700
- ^{1} French Land Register data, which excludes lakes, ponds, glaciers > 1 km^{2} (0.386 sq mi or 247 acres) and river estuaries.

Grézels is a commune in the Lot department in south-western France.

== See also ==
- Communes of the Lot department
