= Frayssinet-le-Gélat =

- Commune
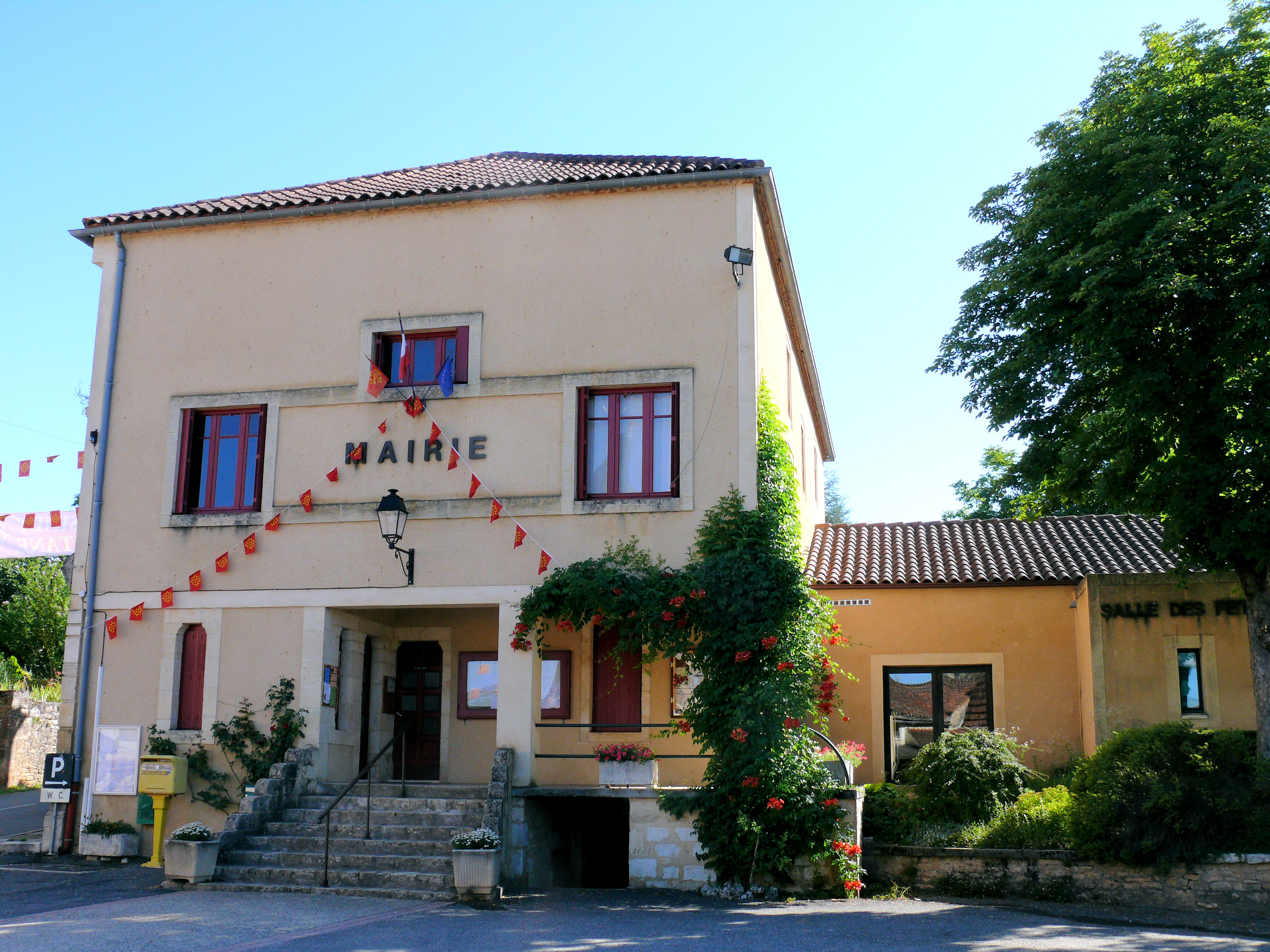
- The town hall in Frayssinet-le-Gélat

- Coat of arms
- Location of Frayssinet-le-Gélat
- Location within France Location within Occitanie
- Coordinates: 44°35′00″N 1°09′53″E
- Country: France
- Region: Occitania
- Department: Lot
- Arrondissement: Gourdon
- Canton: Puy-l'Évêque
- Intercommunality: Cazals-Salviac

Government
  - Mayor (2020–2026): Nadège Gomez
- Area^{1}: 23.14 km^{2} (8.93 sq mi)
- Elevation: 200 m (660 ft)
- Highest elevation: 286 m (938 ft)
- Lowest elevation: 160 m (520 ft)
- Population (2023): 376
  - Density: 16.2/km^{2} (42.1/sq mi)
- Time zone: UTC+01:00 (CET)
  - Summer (DST): UTC+02:00 (CEST)
- INSEE/Postal code: 46114 /46250
- ^{1} French Land Register data, which excludes lakes, ponds, glaciers > 1 km^{2} (0.386 sq mi or 247 acres) and river estuaries.

Frayssinet-le-Gélat (French pronunciation: [fʁɛsinɛ lə ʒela]; Occitan: Fraissinet lo Gelat) is a commune in the Lot department in south-western France.

== History ==
In Frayssinet-le-Gélat, members of the French underground shot and killed a German officer. For this crime, 15 hostages were taken and assassinated by the SS. Ten were young males from one-child families and five were young women. This was to prevent any further family line of descent. The schoolmaster tried to escape but was shot outside the school. Each May 21, villagers gather outside the church for an act of remembrance. Outside the church is a small monument mounted with a stone cross, and a plaque bearing the names of the victims. Another monument to the 15th victim stands where he was shot.

== See also ==
- Communes of the Lot department
- Official website of the commune of Frayssinet-le-Gélat
