= Fargues, Lot =

Fargues
- Part of Porte-du-Quercy
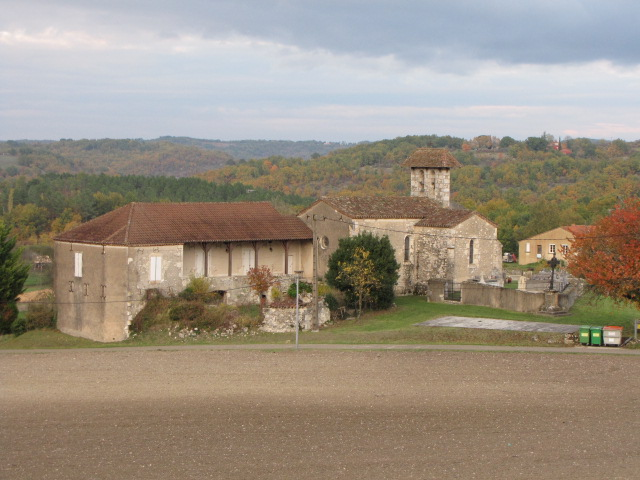
- The church of Farguettes
- Location of Fargues
- Location within France Location within Occitanie
- Coordinates: 44°23′59″N 1°10′56″E
- Country: France
- Region: Occitania
- Department: Lot
- Arrondissement: Cahors
- Canton: Luzech
- Commune: Porte-du-Quercy
- Area^{1}: 14.79 km^{2} (5.71 sq mi)
- Elevation: 266 m (873 ft)
- Highest elevation: 289 m (948 ft)
- Lowest elevation: 155 m (509 ft)
- Population (2022): 156
  - Density: 10.5/km^{2} (27.3/sq mi)
- Time zone: UTC+01:00 (CET)
  - Summer (DST): UTC+02:00 (CEST)
- Postal code: 46800
- ^{1} French Land Register data, which excludes lakes, ponds, glaciers > 1 km^{2} (0.386 sq mi or 247 acres) and river estuaries.

Fargues (French pronunciation: [faʁɡ]; Languedocien: Fargas) is a former commune in the Lot department in south-western France. On 1 January 2019, it was merged into the new commune Porte-du-Quercy.

== Geography ==
The Séoune forms part of the commune's southern border.

== See also ==
- Communes of the Lot department
