= Sérignac, Lot =

Sérignac
- Commune
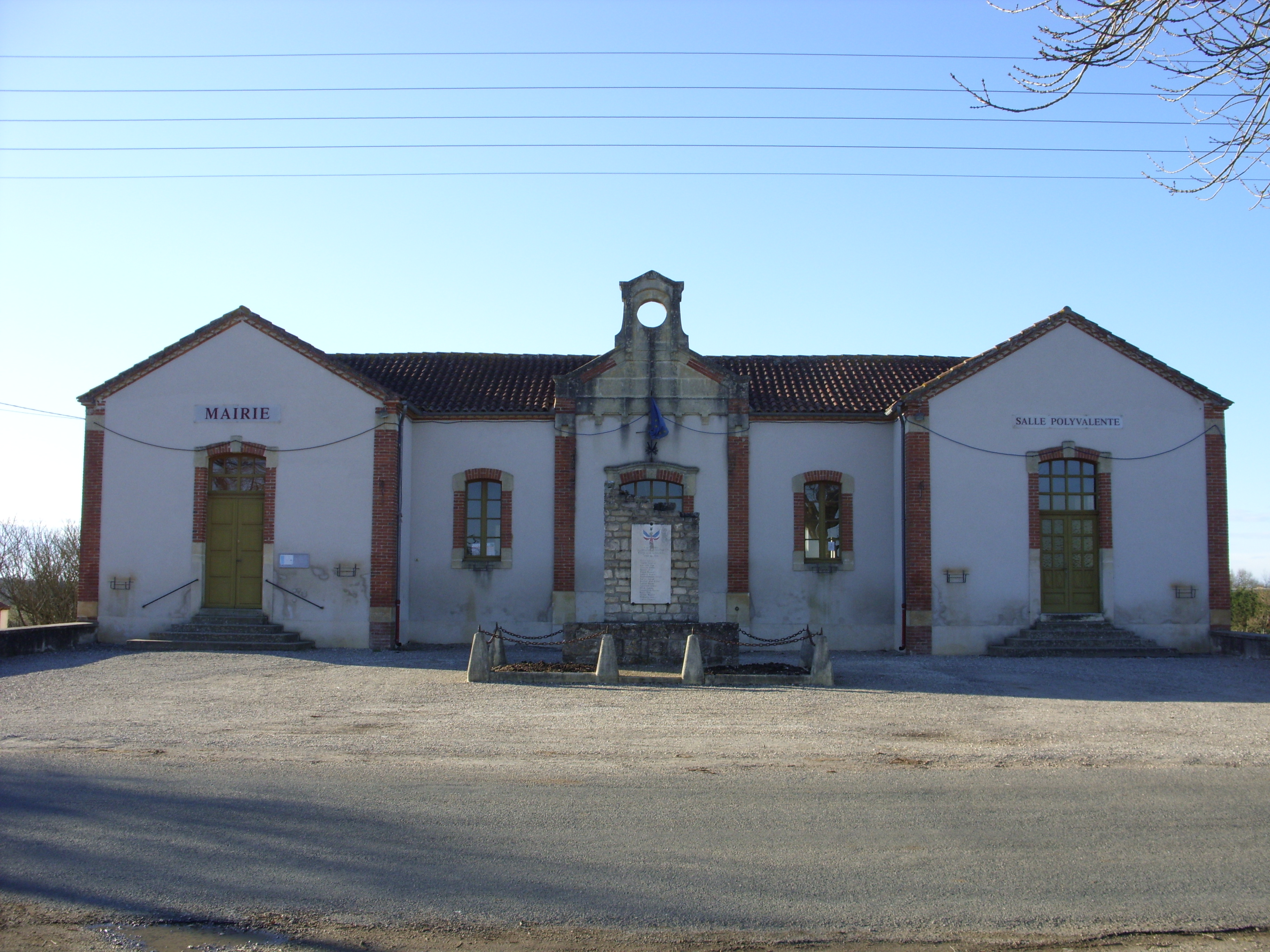
- The town hall of Sérignac
- Location of Sérignac
- Location within France Location within Occitanie
- Coordinates: 44°26′05″N 1°06′20″E
- Country: France
- Region: Occitania
- Department: Lot
- Arrondissement: Cahors
- Canton: Puy-l'Évêque
- Intercommunality: Vallée du Lot et du Vignoble

Government
  - Mayor (2020–2026): Joël Mourgues
- Area^{1}: 18.44 km^{2} (7.12 sq mi)
- Elevation: 250 m (820 ft)
- Highest elevation: 274 m (899 ft)
- Lowest elevation: 160 m (520 ft)
- Population (2023): 326
  - Density: 17.7/km^{2} (45.8/sq mi)
- Time zone: UTC+01:00 (CET)
  - Summer (DST): UTC+02:00 (CEST)
- INSEE/Postal code: 46305 /46700
- ^{1} French Land Register data, which excludes lakes, ponds, glaciers > 1 km^{2} (0.386 sq mi or 247 acres) and river estuaries.

Sérignac (French pronunciation: [seʁiɲak]; Occitan: Serinhac) is a commune in the Lot department in south-western France.

== See also ==
- Communes of the Lot department
