= Pomarède =

- Commune
- Location of Pomarède
- Location within France Location within Occitanie
- Coordinates: 44°33′56″N 1°10′17″E
- Country: France
- Region: Occitania
- Department: Lot
- Arrondissement: Gourdon
- Canton: Puy-l'Évêque
- Intercommunality: Cazals-Salviac

Government
  - Mayor (2020–2026): Véronique Chassain
- Area^{1}: 7.04 km^{2} (2.72 sq mi)
- Elevation: 136 m (446 ft)
- Highest elevation: 285 m (935 ft)
- Lowest elevation: 154 m (505 ft)
- Population (2023): 189
  - Density: 26.8/km^{2} (69.5/sq mi)
- Time zone: UTC+01:00 (CET)
  - Summer (DST): UTC+02:00 (CEST)
- INSEE/Postal code: 46222 /46250
- ^{1} French Land Register data, which excludes lakes, ponds, glaciers > 1 km^{2} (0.386 sq mi or 247 acres) and river estuaries.

Pomarède is a commune in the Lot department in south-western France.

== See also ==
- Communes of the Lot department
