= Soturac =

- Commune
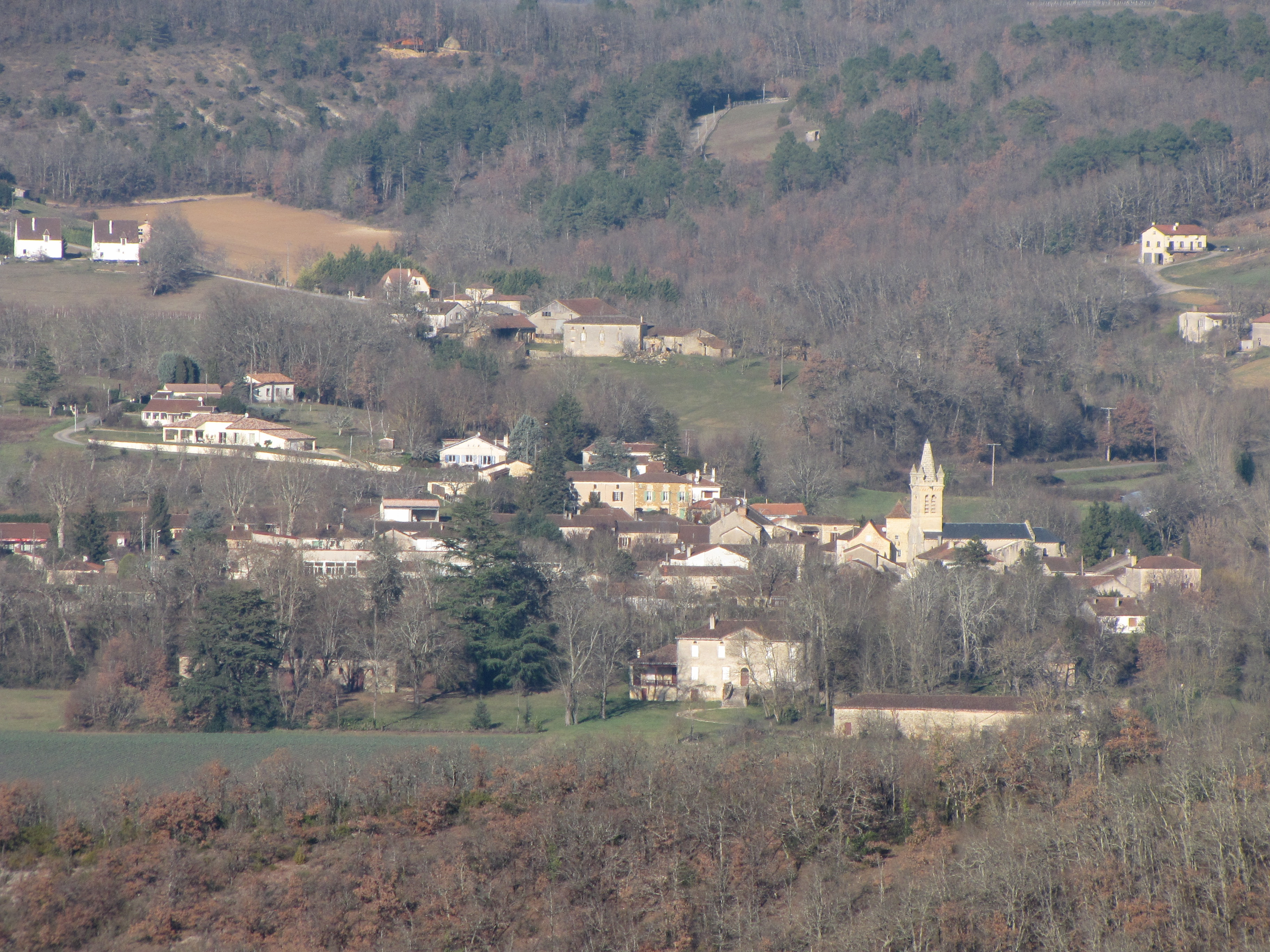
- A general view of Soturac
- Location of Soturac
- Location within France Location within Occitanie
- Coordinates: 44°29′22″N 1°01′03″E
- Country: France
- Region: Occitania
- Department: Lot
- Arrondissement: Cahors
- Canton: Puy-l'Évêque
- Intercommunality: Vallée du Lot et Vignoble

Government
  - Mayor (2020–2026): Jérôme Belmonte
- Area^{1}: 19.55 km^{2} (7.55 sq mi)
- Elevation: 79 m (259 ft)
- Highest elevation: 234 m (768 ft)
- Lowest elevation: 65 m (213 ft)
- Population (2023): 644
  - Density: 32.9/km^{2} (85.3/sq mi)
- Time zone: UTC+01:00 (CET)
  - Summer (DST): UTC+02:00 (CEST)
- INSEE/Postal code: 46307 /46700
- ^{1} French Land Register data, which excludes lakes, ponds, glaciers > 1 km^{2} (0.386 sq mi or 247 acres) and river estuaries.

Soturac (French pronunciation: [sɔtyʁak]) is a commune in the Lot department in south-western France.

== See also ==
- Communes of the Lot department
