= Kagor (wine) =

Fortified dessert wine

Kagor is a fortified dessert wine made from cabernet sauvignon, saperavi and other grapes on the Black Sea coast, primarily in Moldova and Crimea. Its name comes from Cahors, France. Conversely, the dominant grape variety in French Cahors wine is Malbec.

Kagor originated as a sacramental wine for use in Russian Orthodox liturgy.
