= Mauroux, Lot =

Mauroux
- Commune
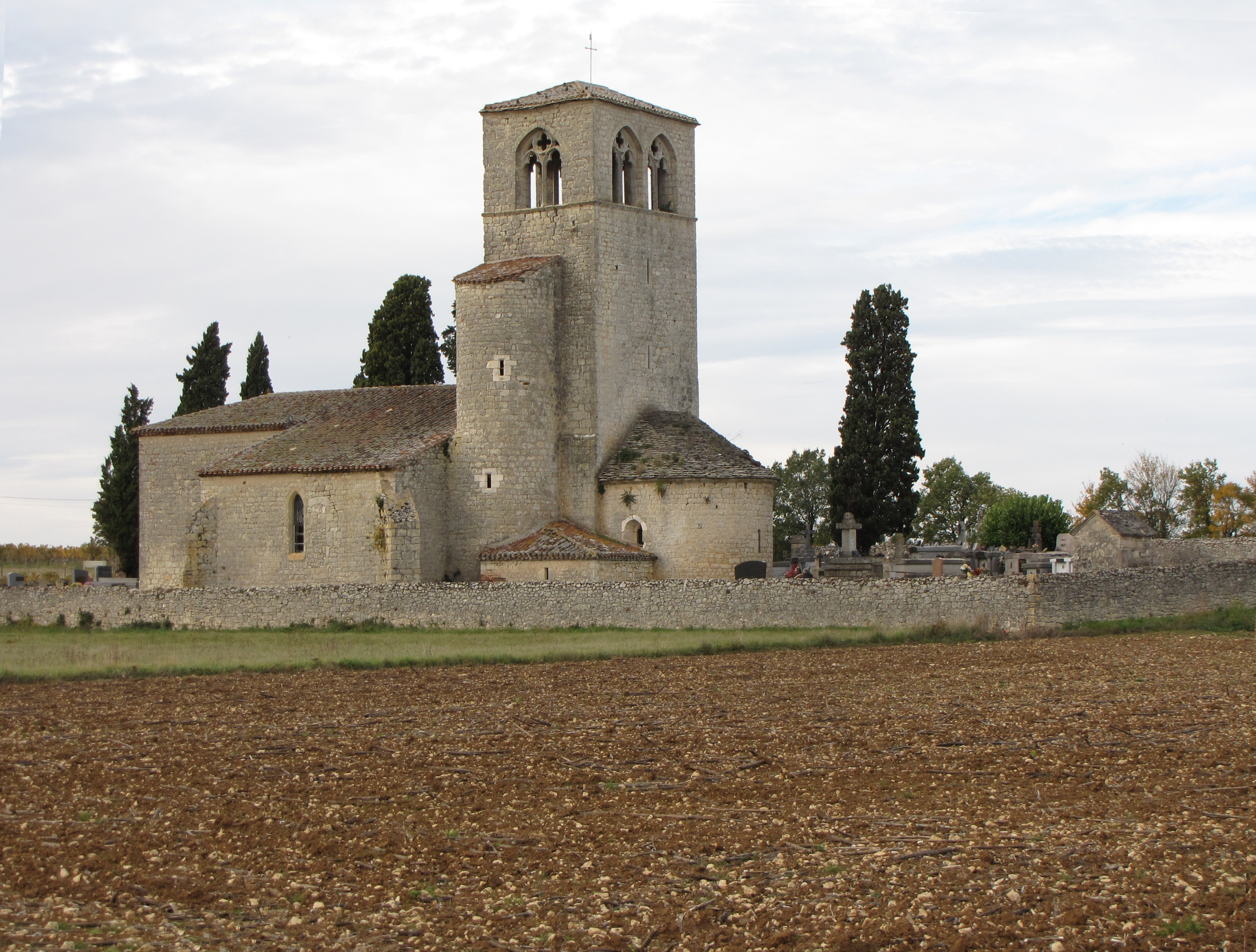
- The church of Cabanac, in Mauroux
- Location of Mauroux
- Location within France Location within Occitanie
- Coordinates: 44°27′22″N 1°02′50″E
- Country: France
- Region: Occitania
- Department: Lot
- Arrondissement: Cahors
- Canton: Puy-l'Évêque
- Intercommunality: CC Vallée du Lot et du Vignoble

Government
  - Mayor (2020–2026): Jean-Marc Xuereb
- Area^{1}: 16.2 km^{2} (6.3 sq mi)
- Elevation: 213 m (699 ft)
- Highest elevation: 271 m (889 ft)
- Lowest elevation: 65 m (213 ft)
- Population (2023): 580
  - Density: 36/km^{2} (93/sq mi)
- Time zone: UTC+01:00 (CET)
  - Summer (DST): UTC+02:00 (CEST)
- INSEE/Postal code: 46187 /46700
- ^{1} French Land Register data, which excludes lakes, ponds, glaciers > 1 km^{2} (0.386 sq mi or 247 acres) and river estuaries.

Mauroux (French pronunciation: [moʁu]; Occitan: Maurós) is a commune in the Lot department in south-western France. As of 2023, the population of the commune was 580. The inhabitants of Mauroux are called Maurosiens in French.

== See also ==
- Communes of the Lot department
