= Cassagnes, Lot =

Cassagnes
- Commune
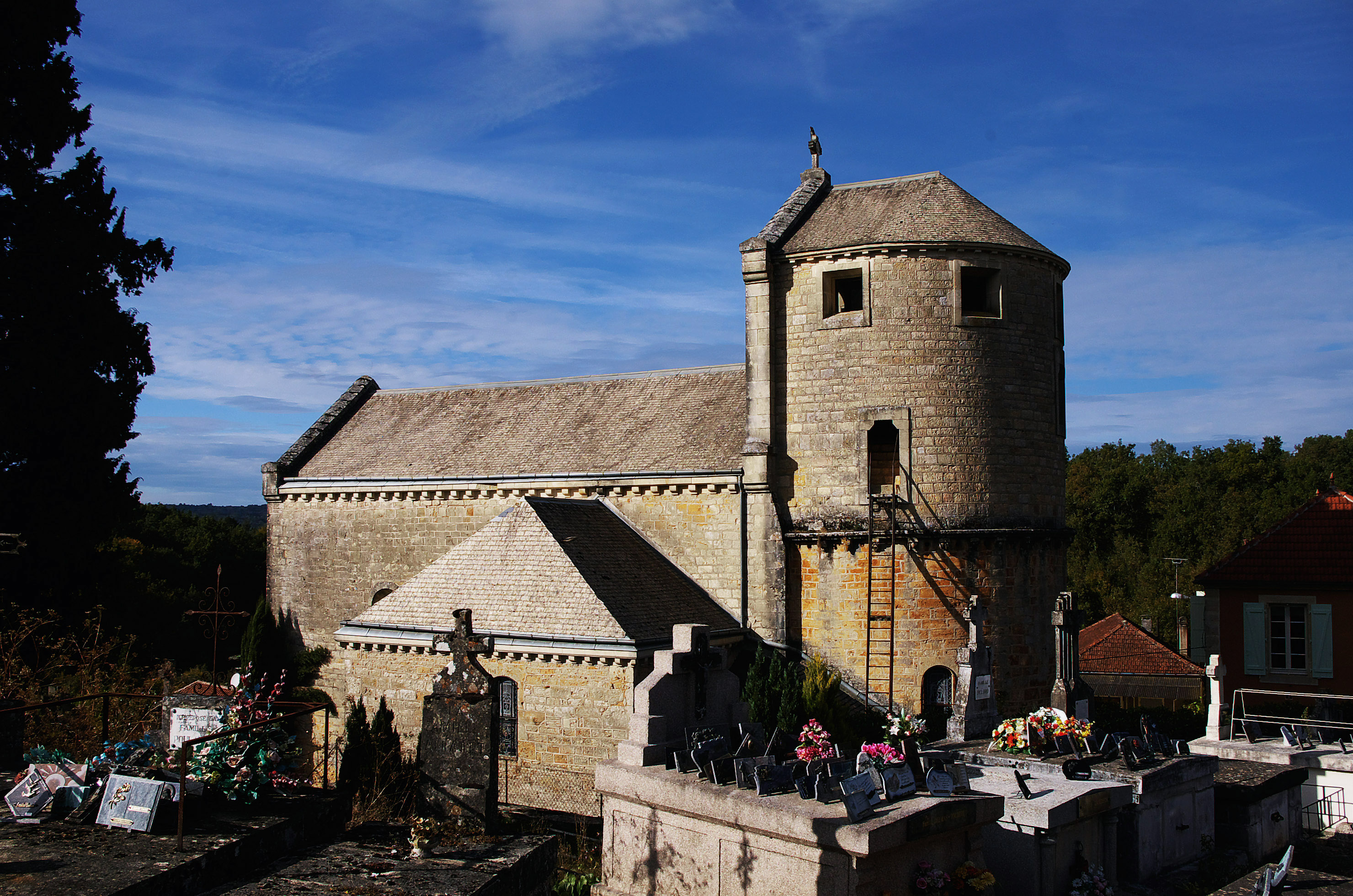
- The church in Cassagnes

- Coat of arms
- Location of Cassagnes
- Location within France Location within Occitanie
- Coordinates: 44°33′35″N 1°08′23″E
- Country: France
- Region: Occitania
- Department: Lot
- Arrondissement: Cahors
- Canton: Puy-l'Évêque
- Intercommunality: CC Vallée du Lot et du Vignoble

Government
  - Mayor (2020–2026): Bernard Landiech
- Area^{1}: 11.62 km^{2} (4.49 sq mi)
- Elevation: 115 m (377 ft)
- Highest elevation: 300 m (980 ft)
- Lowest elevation: 148 m (486 ft)
- Population (2023): 172
  - Density: 14.8/km^{2} (38.3/sq mi)
- Time zone: UTC+01:00 (CET)
  - Summer (DST): UTC+02:00 (CEST)
- INSEE/Postal code: 46061 /46700
- ^{1} French Land Register data, which excludes lakes, ponds, glaciers > 1 km^{2} (0.386 sq mi or 247 acres) and river estuaries.

Cassagnes (French pronunciation: [kasaɲ]; Occitan: Cassanhas) is a commune in the Lot department in south-western France.

== See also ==
- Communes of the Lot department
