= Lherm, Lot =

Lherm
- Commune
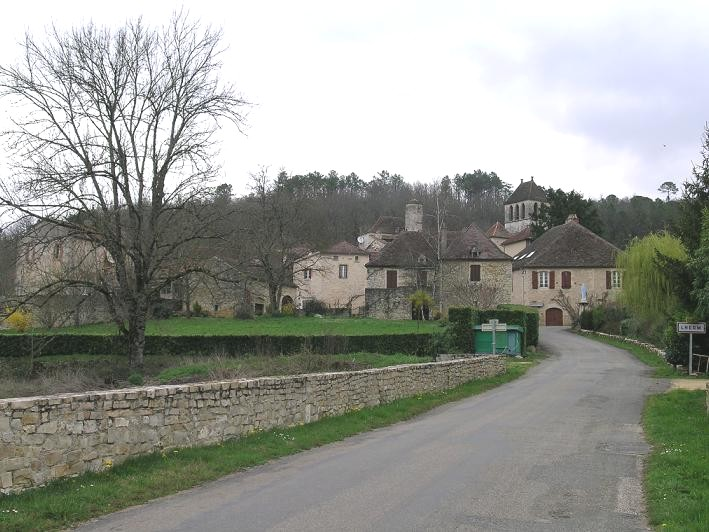
- A general view of Lherm
- Location of Lherm
- Location within France Location within Occitanie
- Coordinates: 44°34′06″N 1°14′47″E
- Country: France
- Region: Occitania
- Department: Lot
- Arrondissement: Cahors
- Canton: Puy-l'Évêque
- Intercommunality: CA Grand Cahors

Government
  - Mayor (2020–2026): Jean-Albert Reix
- Area^{1}: 13.47 km^{2} (5.20 sq mi)
- Elevation: 164 m (538 ft)
- Highest elevation: 306 m (1,004 ft)
- Lowest elevation: 114 m (374 ft)
- Population (2023): 228
  - Density: 16.9/km^{2} (43.8/sq mi)
- Time zone: UTC+01:00 (CET)
  - Summer (DST): UTC+02:00 (CEST)
- INSEE/Postal code: 46171 /46150
- ^{1} French Land Register data, which excludes lakes, ponds, glaciers > 1 km^{2} (0.386 sq mi or 247 acres) and river estuaries.

Lherm (French pronunciation: [lɛʁm]; Occitan: L'Èrm) is a commune in the Lot department in south-western France.

== See also ==
- Communes of the Lot department
