= Les Junies =

- Commune
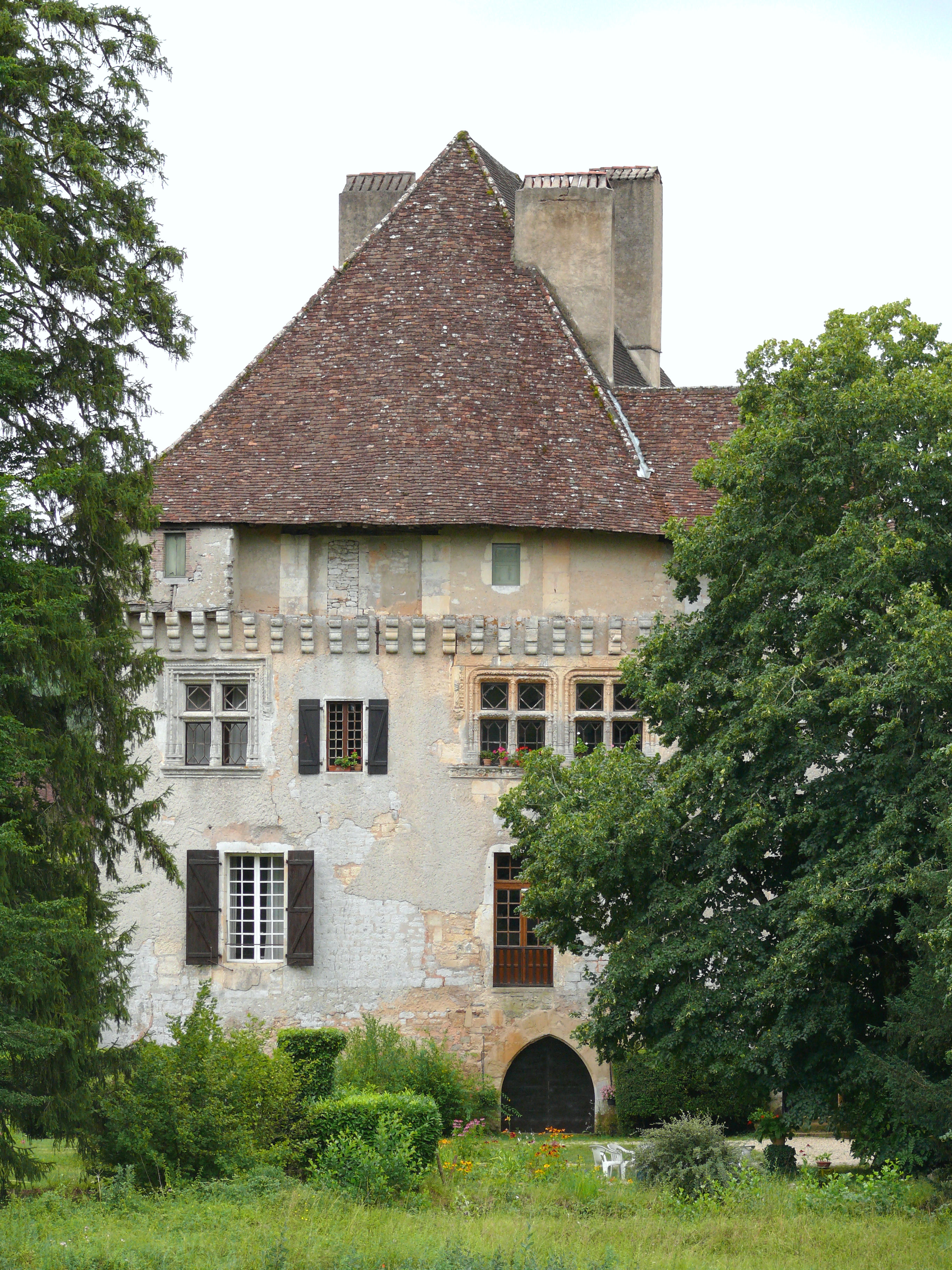
- The chateau in Les Junies
- Location of Les Junies
- Location within France Location within Occitanie
- Coordinates: 44°32′21″N 1°14′10″E
- Country: France
- Region: Occitania
- Department: Lot
- Arrondissement: Cahors
- Canton: Puy-l'Évêque
- Intercommunality: CA Grand Cahors

Government
  - Mayor (2020–2026): Agnès Simon-Picquet
- Area^{1}: 13.06 km^{2} (5.04 sq mi)
- Elevation: 117 m (384 ft)
- Highest elevation: 296 m (971 ft)
- Lowest elevation: 100 m (330 ft)
- Population (2023): 251
  - Density: 19.2/km^{2} (49.8/sq mi)
- Time zone: UTC+01:00 (CET)
  - Summer (DST): UTC+02:00 (CEST)
- INSEE/Postal code: 46134 /46150
- ^{1} French Land Register data, which excludes lakes, ponds, glaciers > 1 km^{2} (0.386 sq mi or 247 acres) and river estuaries.

Les Junies (French pronunciation: [le ʒyni]; Occitan: Las Joanias) is a commune in the Lot department in south-western France.

== See also ==
- Communes of the Lot department
