= Vire-sur-Lot =

- Commune
- Location of Vire-sur-Lot
- Location within France Location within Occitanie
- Coordinates: 44°29′30″N 1°05′16″E
- Country: France
- Region: Occitania
- Department: Lot
- Arrondissement: Cahors
- Canton: Puy-l'Évêque
- Intercommunality: CC de la Vallée du Lot et du Vignoble

Government
  - Mayor (2020–2026): Yvette Froidefond
- Area^{1}: 7.77 km^{2} (3.00 sq mi)
- Elevation: 110 m (360 ft)
- Highest elevation: 269 m (883 ft)
- Lowest elevation: 67 m (220 ft)
- Population (2023): 348
  - Density: 44.8/km^{2} (116/sq mi)
- Time zone: UTC+01:00 (CET)
  - Summer (DST): UTC+02:00 (CEST)
- INSEE/Postal code: 46336 /46700
- ^{1} French Land Register data, which excludes lakes, ponds, glaciers > 1 km^{2} (0.386 sq mi or 247 acres) and river estuaries.

Vire-sur-Lot (French pronunciation: [viʁ syʁ lɔt], literally Vire on Lot; Occitan: Vira) is a commune in the Lot department in south-western France.

== See also ==
- Communes of the Lot department
