= Puy-l'Évêque =

- Commune
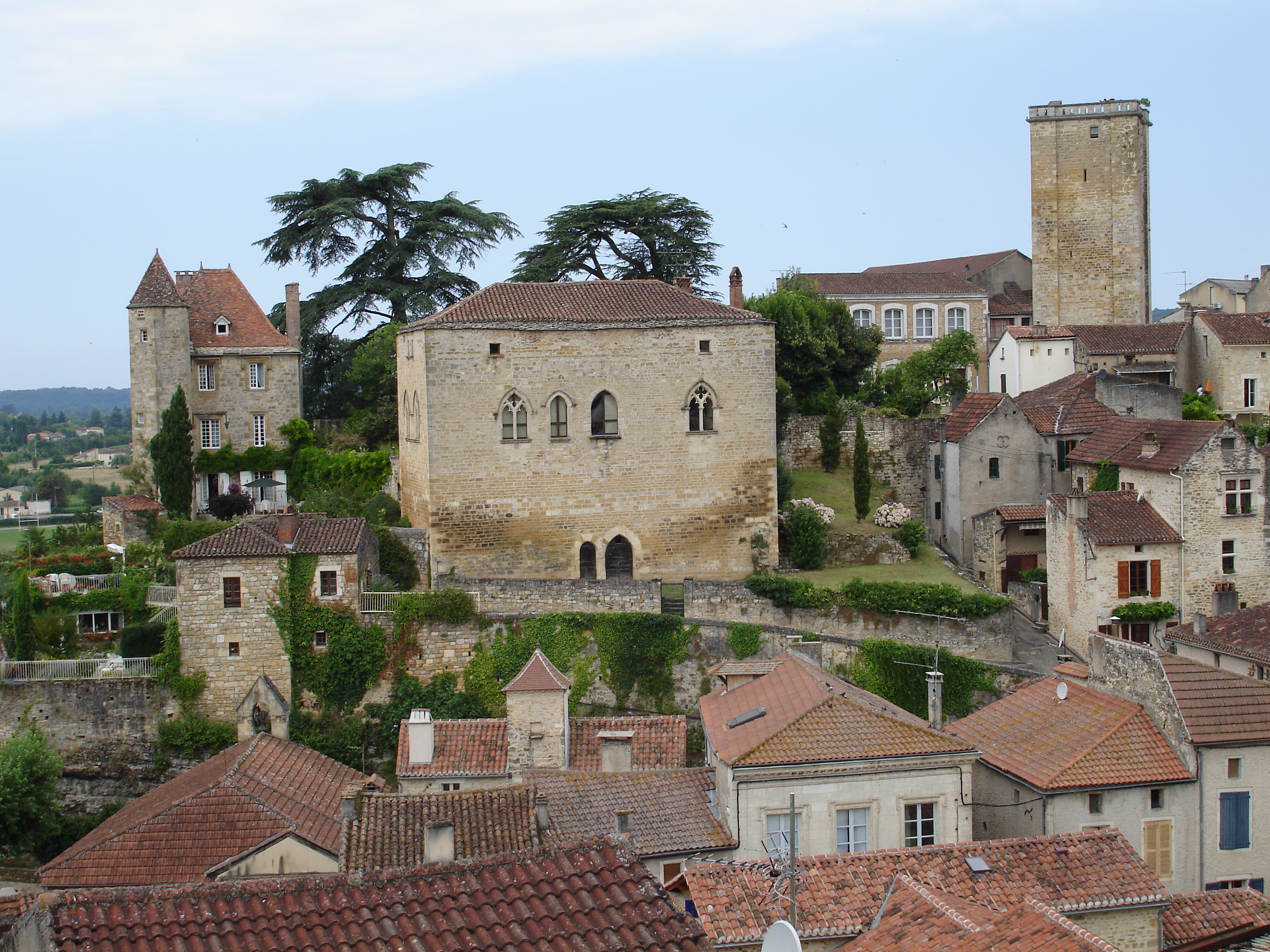
- View of Puy l'Évêque

- Coat of arms
- Location of Puy-l'Évêque
- Location within France Location within Occitanie
- Coordinates: 44°30′20″N 1°08′20″E
- Country: France
- Region: Occitania
- Department: Lot
- Arrondissement: Cahors
- Canton: Puy-l'Évêque
- Intercommunality: Vallée du Lot et Vignoble

Government
  - Mayor (2020–2026): Serge Guérin
- Area^{1}: 26.38 km^{2} (10.19 sq mi)
- Elevation: 86 m (282 ft)
- Highest elevation: 284 m (932 ft)
- Lowest elevation: 80 m (260 ft)
- Population (2023): 1,860
  - Density: 70.5/km^{2} (183/sq mi)
- Time zone: UTC+01:00 (CET)
  - Summer (DST): UTC+02:00 (CEST)
- INSEE/Postal code: 46231 /46700
- ^{1} French Land Register data, which excludes lakes, ponds, glaciers > 1 km^{2} (0.386 sq mi or 247 acres) and river estuaries.

Puy-l'Évêque (French pronunciation: [pɥi levɛk]; Languedocien: Puèg l’Avesque) is a commune of France situated in the Lot department, in the Occitanie region. The town is picturesquely situated at the neck of a long loop of the Lot river in Quercy on the D811 between Fumel and Cahors, it is at the center of the Cahors (AOC) wine region.

== History ==
The origins of the town are obscure. Though vestiges of a Roman road have been discovered running through it, there is no mention of the town until the Middle Ages. It was a Cathar stronghold before the Albigensian Crusade; in 1228 the warrior Bishop of Cahors, Guillaume de Cardaillac, took possession of it and gave it the present name of Puy-l’Evêque, "Bishop's Hill". From then on, it remained under the control of the Count-Bishops of Cahors. Puy-l'Évêque suffered considerably in the Hundred Years' War when it was occupied for a time by the English. In 1580, during the Wars of Religion, it was besieged unsuccessfully by the Protestants under the future King Henri IV; the marks of his cannonballs can still be seen in the main church of Saint-Sauveur.

With the French Revolution the rule of the Count-Bishops ended and the town briefly took the name of 'Puy Libre'. In the period of prosperity that followed the Napoleonic Wars the town was transformed. The 1830s and 1840s saw the construction of the first bridge over the Lot, and the building of the Route Nationale 111 (now D811), the first good road connection to the outside world. A branch railroad line arrived in 1869.

== Nomenclature ==
The name Puy-l'Évêque (in Occitan: Pèg l'Avesque) is formed from Puy, a French version of the Occitan word pèg or pech, derived from the Latin word podium, in the sense of being raised to a height. L'Évêque indicates that this came under the suzerainty of the Comte-Évêque of Cahors: Guillaume de Cardaillac1.

During the French Revolution the commune was renamed Puy-Libre and Puy-sur-Lot2.

The inhabitants of the commune are known as Puy-l'Évêquois.

== Sights and monuments ==
Puy-l’Evêque grew up as a bourg around the Count-Bishops' castle on the cliffs above the river; of this only the 13th-century donjon remains, next to the town hall. Beneath it, the Cale along the Lot is the landing where the gabarres (river barges) of the old days transported the region's wine to Bordeaux for export. From here the Rue de la Cale was the main street until the 19th century; the narrow medieval side streets that run off it bear the names of the trades that were practiced on them: Rue des Tanneurs (Tanners), Rue des Teinturiers (dyers), etc. Rue de la Cale follows a stream called the Clédelles, once lined with the mills that supplied the medieval town's prosperity. Above these, palaces of the medieval merchants line Rue des Capucins and Rue Bovila. The church of Saint-Sauveur (14th-16th centuries) stands on a height outside the center; in medieval times it was built into the town's wall, to serve as a strong point in its defense.

== Economy ==
Puy-l’Evêque today lives largely on wine and tourism. 75% of the commune's agricultural land is under vines, and nearly a fifth of its residences are holiday homes.

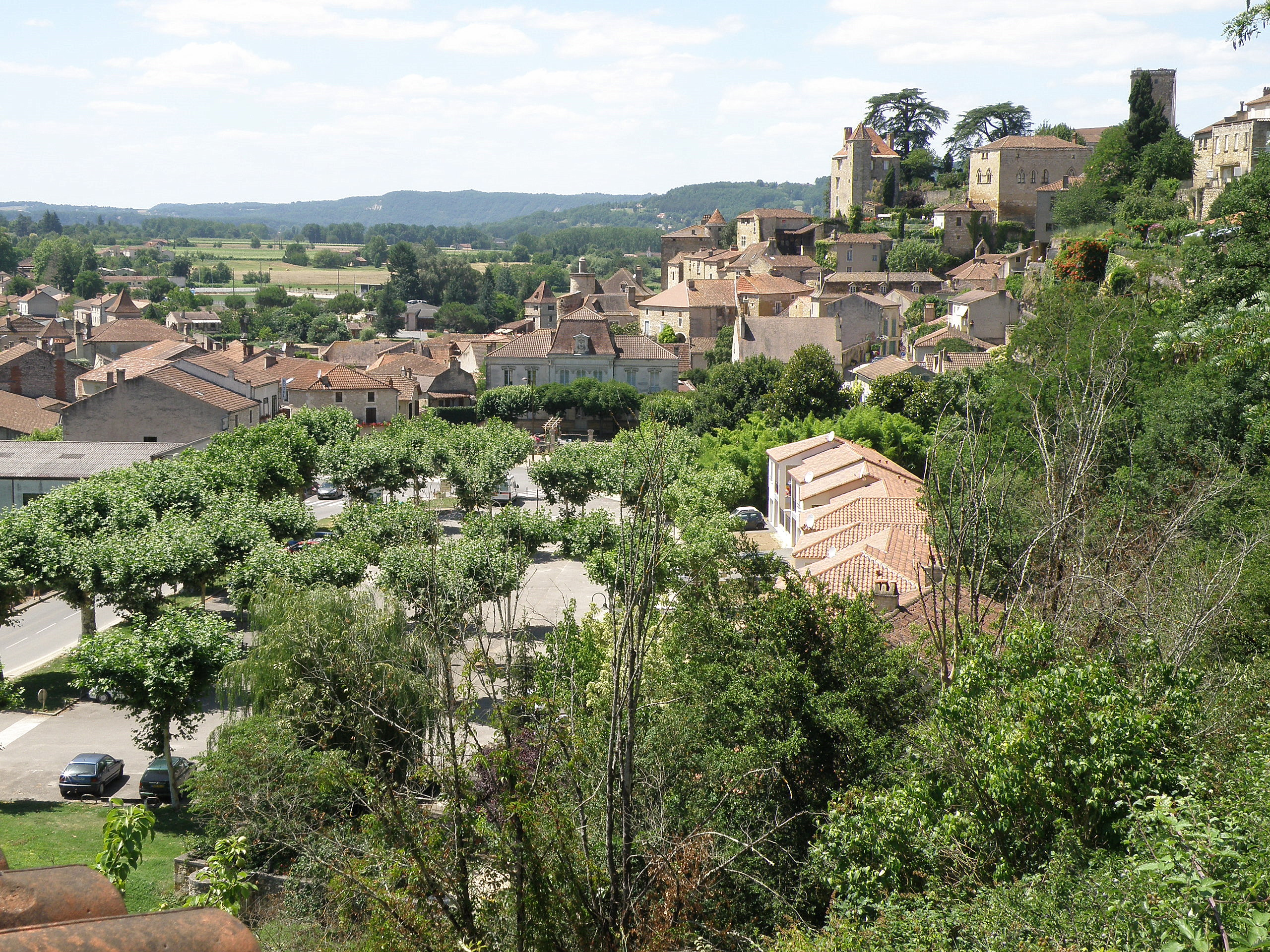
General view

== Mayors ==
Period	Name	Party
2008–2014	Serge Guérin	Quality
2003–2008	Guy Sudrie	Quality
–2003	Savournin	Quality
March 1945–	Ernest Marcouly	Quality

== Population ==
At the start of the 20th century, Puy-l'Évêque had 1,887 inhabitants.

Historical population
Year	Pop.	±% p.a.
1968	2,261	—
1975	2,353	+0.57%
1982	2,302	−0.31%
1990	2,209	−0.51%
1999	2,159	−0.25%
2007	2,197	+0.22%
2012	2,044	−1.43%
2017	1,973	−0.70%
2023	1,860	−0.98%
Source: INSEE

== See also ==
- Communes of the Lot department
