= Canton of Puy-l'Évêque =

Coordinates: 44.50°N 1.14°E

The canton of Puy-l'Évêque is an administrative division of the Lot department, southern France. Its borders were modified at the French canton reorganisation which came into effect in March 2015. Its seat is in Puy-l'Évêque.

It consists of the following communes:

1. Les Arques
2. Cassagnes
3. Duravel
4. Floressas
5. Frayssinet-le-Gélat
6. Goujounac
7. Grézels
8. Les Junies
9. Lacapelle-Cabanac
10. Lagardelle
11. Lherm
12. Mauroux
13. Montcabrier
14. Montcléra
15. Pescadoires
16. Pomarède
17. Porte-du-Quercy
18. Prayssac
19. Puy-l'Évêque
20. Saint-Caprais
21. Saint-Martin-le-Redon
22. Sérignac
23. Soturac
24. Touzac
25. Vire-sur-Lot
