= Bleu des Causses =

French cheese

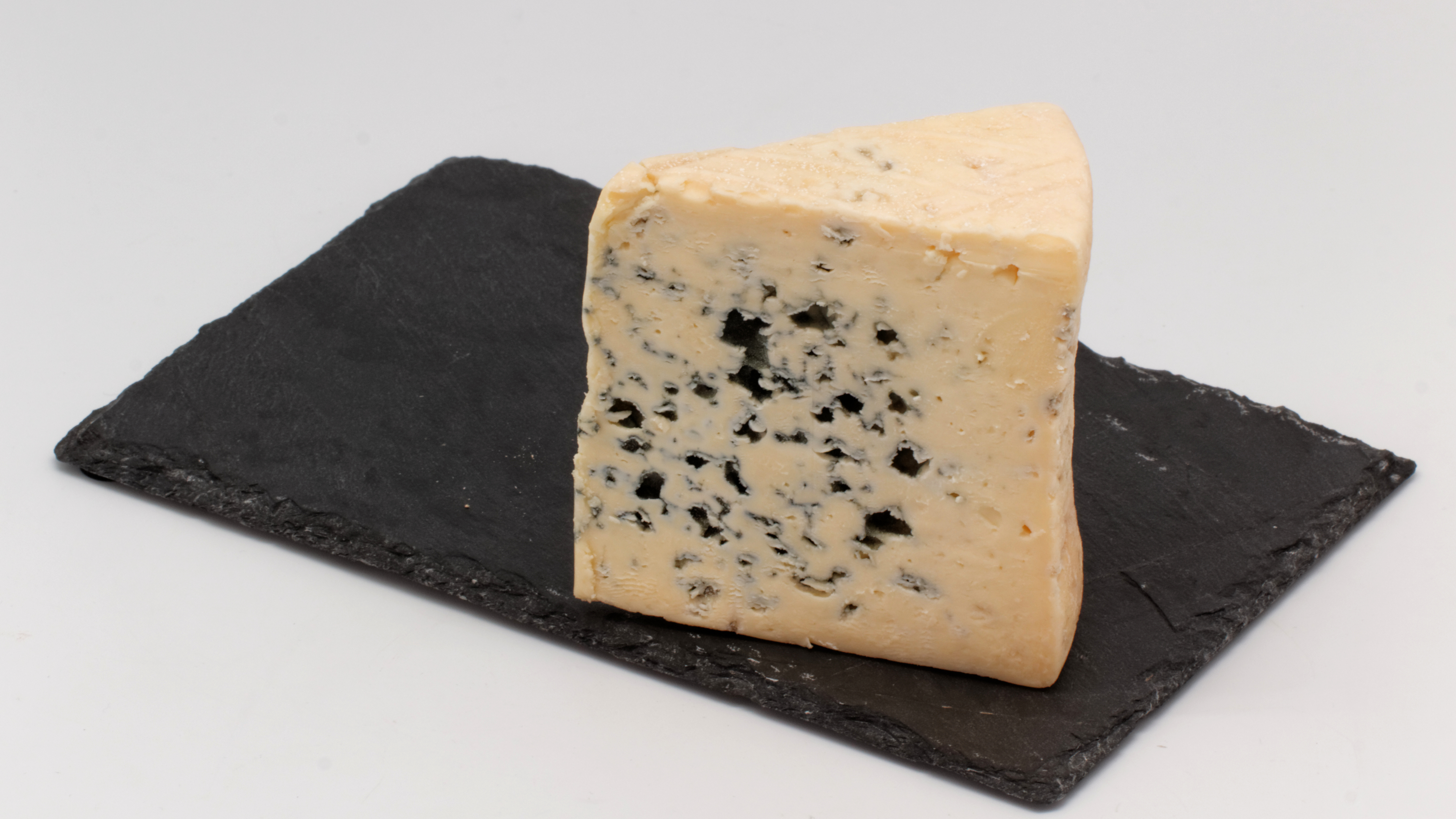
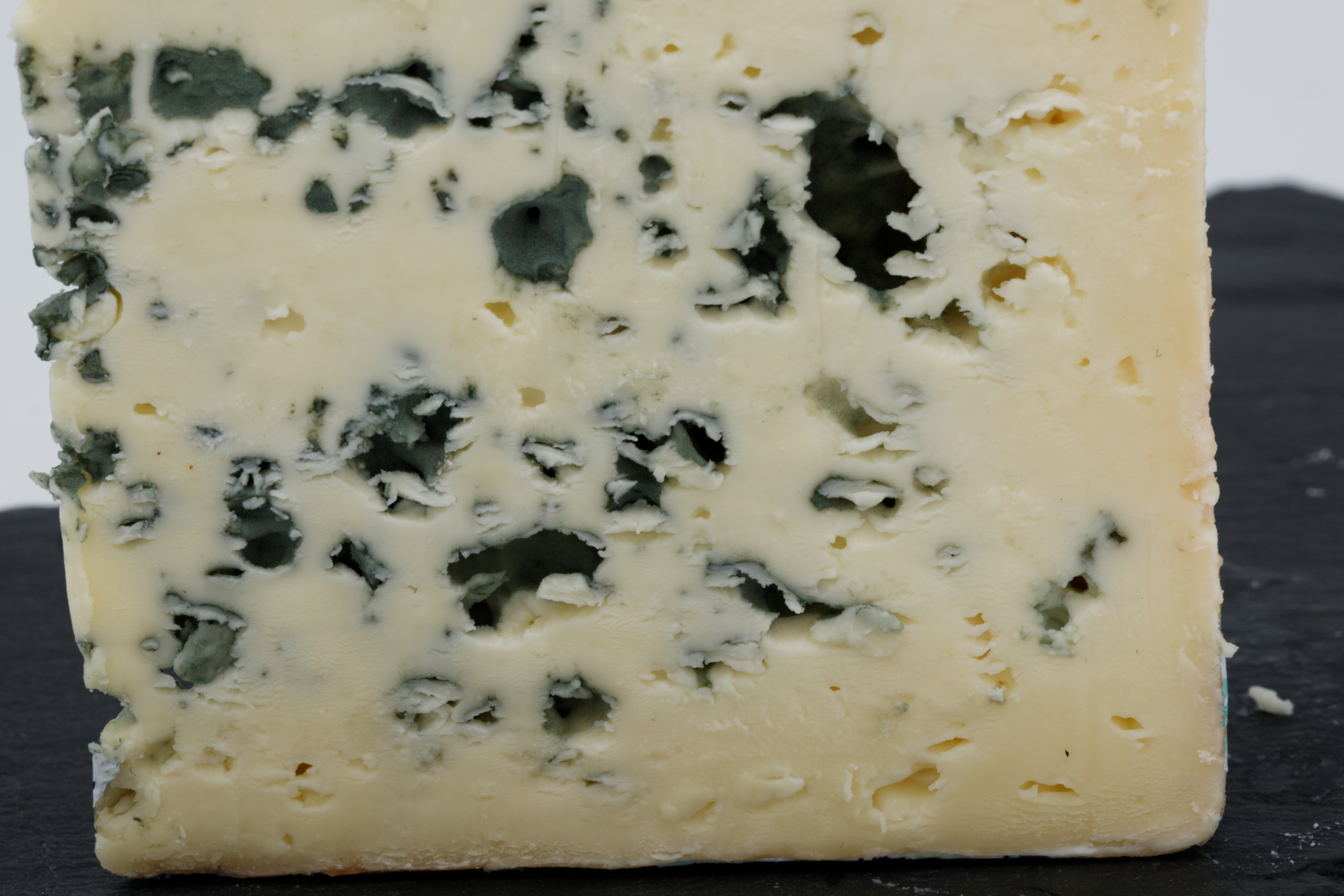
- Bleu des Causses Texture of Bleu des Causses
- Country of origin: France
- Region, town: At the entrance of Gorges du Tarn
- Source of milk: Cows
- Pasteurised: No
- Fat content: 45%
- Aging time: 3-6 months
- Certification: AOC, 1949

Bleu des Causses (French pronunciation: [blø de kos]; Occitan: Blau dels Causses) is a French blue cheese made from whole cow's milk. Some consider it as a mild variant of Roquefort. The cheese has a fat content of 45% and is aged for 3–6 months in Gorges du Tarn's natural limestone caves. The ripening process involving naturally temperature-controlled cellars is the major element that gives it its special aroma. Today, it is a relatively rare cheese that is only made by a handful of small producers.

== History ==
The Bleu des Causses shares an ancient history with the Roquefort, in a time where the cheese was made from mixed milk from a cow and a sheep, or pure milk from one or the other, based on the season and the cheesemaker.

=== Roman Gaul ===
Pliny the Elder mentions that the cheeses of Mont Lozère and Gévaudan were esteemed in ancient Rome, a remark traditionally interpreted as an early reference to the region's blue cheese, but often objected to by modern authors, on the grounds that he does not clearly identify them as blue.

=== Middle Ages ===
An anecdote from Knotker the Stammer is often said to prove Charlemagne ate blue cheese, but in fact shows him cutting off the crust of the cheese, as for a white-rind cheese like Brie or Camembert. "15. In the same journey too he came to a bishop who lived in a place through which he must needs pass. Now on that day, being the sixth day of the week, he was not willing to eat the flesh of beast or bird; and the bishop, being by reason of the nature of the place unable to procure fish upon the sudden, ordered some excellent cheese, rich and creamy, to be placed before him. And the most self-restrained Charles, with the readiness which he showed everywhere and on all occasions, spared the blushes of the bishop and required no better fare: but taking up his knife cut off the skin, which he thought unsavoury, and fell to on the white of the cheese. Thereupon the bishop, who was standing near like a servant, drew closer and said, "Why do you do that, lord emperor? You are throwing away the very best part." Then Charles, who deceived no one, and did not believe that anyone would deceive him, on the persuasion of the bishop put a piece of the skin in his mouth, and slowly ate it and swallowed it like butter."

=== Contemporary period ===
Many artisanal cheese cellars refine cow's milk, sheep's milk, or even a mixture of both. It is sold without a provincial name. In 1925, during the administrative recognition of the original name of Roquefort, the cheese must be refined to Roquefort-sur-Soulzon and cheeses from cow's milk is banned. Because of this, producers of cheese from cow's milk begin to structure their organizations. The collective mark "Valmont" was created to support the sales of the cheese "bleu de l'Aveyron". The final name "Bleu des Causses" was decided on by two decrees in 1941 and 1946. The union constitution dated July 1948 and the delimitation of the geographical area in 1953. Official recognition of the Appellation d'origine contrôlée (AOC} dated June 8, 1949. In 1992, the union building opened their doors to cow breeders; they added to dairies and refineries.

== Area of development ==
=== Geographical area ===
The geographical area of the production of the milk and the development of the cheese covers a valley region, limestone or schist plateaus, and, to a lesser extent, some mountains. It is bounded to the department of Lot in Aveyron (excluding the regions of Mur de Barrez and Sainte-Geneviève sur Argence) and west Lozère.

In the department of Aveyron, the bounds include all the common boroughs of Millau and of Villefranche-de-Rouergue, and all the common regions of Baraqueville-Sauveterre, Bozouls, Cassagnes-Bégonhès, Conques, Entraygues-sur-Truyère, Espalion, Estaing, Laguiole, Laissac, Marcillac-Vallon, Naucelle, Pont-de-Salars, Réquista, Rignac, Rodez-Nord, Rodez-Est, Saint-Amans-des-Cots, Saint-Chély-d'Aubrac, Saint-Geniez-d'Olt and La Salvetat-Peyrales in the Arrondissement de Rodez.

In the department of Lot, the bound concerns all the common regions of Cahors, Castel-Montratier, Catus, Labastide-Murat, Lalbenque, Lauzès, Limogne-en-Quercy, Luzech, Montcuq, Puy-L'Evêque, Saint-Géry, Cajarc and the communes of Boussac, Brengues, Calès, Cambes, Corn, Durbans, Espagnac-Sainte-Eulalie, Espédaillac, Flaujac-Gare, Gignac, Grezes, Lachapelle-Auzac, Lamothe-Cassel, Lamothe-Fénelon, Lanzac, Le Roc, Le Vigan, Livernon, Loupiac, Montamel, Nadaillac-de-Rouge, Payrac, Quissac, Reilhac, Reilhaguet, Saint-Chamarand, Saint-Cirq-Souillaguet, Saint-Projet, Soucirac, Souillac, Ussel and Uzech.

In the department of Lozère, the bound concerns all the common regions of Aumont-Aubrac, Canourgue, Chanac, Le Malzieu-Ville, Marvejols, Le Massegros, Saint-Chély-d'Apcher and the communes of Allenc, Badaroux, Balsièges, Brenoux, Chadenet, Chirac, Grèze, Florac, Ispagnac, Lanuéjols, Le Monastier-Pin-Moriès, Mende, Meyrueis, Montrodat, Palhers, Saint-Bauzile, Saint-Bonnet-de-Chirac, Saint-Étienne-du-Valdonnez, Saint-Germain-du-Teil, Saint-Laurent-de-Trèves, Saint-Pierre-de-Nogaret, Sainte-Enimie, Sainte-Hélène and Vebron.

In the department of Gard, only the town of Trèves and in the department of Hérault, only the town of Pégairolles-de-l'Escalette benefit from the classification of the boundaries.

In fact, only the Aveyron and Lozèze parties produce cheese.

The refining fourmes is much more restrictive. It concerns some regions of the district of Millau: Campagnac, Cornus, Millau-Ouest, Millau-Est, Peyreleau, Saint-Affrique, and at the towns of Trèves and of Pégairolles-de-l'Escalette.

=== Geology and climatology ===
The terroir includes, among others, land caussenardes who gave their name to this cheese. These are characterized by a limestone subsoil drainage, causing drought when rain are scarce. Rich soil is low, giving short and bushy vegetation. However, this naturally sparse vegetation is aromatic and contributes to the flavor of the milk.

The refining zone has vertical limestone cliffs carved by the erosion of the rivers Tarn, Doubie, and Jonte. Over the centuries, some rockslides have created caves ventilated by fleurines, cracks in the rock allowing the circulation of air. It is the biggest of these caves that ripening cellars were built. They have a very stable humidity and temperature, favorable to the development of blue mold.

=== Milk production ===
It is not specified what kind of milk is needed or the feeding conditions of the animal. As long as the animal is free of brucellosis and tuberculosis.

=== Manufacture and ripening ===
Cheese making can be done in all of the defined area. Cow's milk, specifically, is whole and full of rennet. The operation takes place with hot milk (30 to 33 °C or 86 to 91.4 °F) at the same time as the seeding of spores from the Penicillium roqueforti fungus, the mold responsible for the blue forms. These spores are from selected strains in the refining area. Under the action of the rennet, the milk coagulates. The curd is then sliced and then brewed. The grains are then become rounded and let out the whey. Draining can then be done on perforated molds. It is promoted by inverting the cheese. At demolding, the cheese is salted with dry salt (not soaking in brine). Work at the dairy then completes and the cheeses are shipped to the maturing cellar. Upon arriving at the maturing cellar, the cheeses are then brushed or washed and wiped. They are then perforated: this operation promotes internal ventilation of the cheese and allows harmonious development of mold. The cheese is then stored on racks in cellars naturally temperature controlled by fleurine. Between production and refinement, preparation should take at least 70 days. Before selling, refrigeration is not part of the refinement.

== See also ==
- List of cheeses
