= Loupiac =

Loupiac may refer to the following places in France:

- Loupiac, Gironde, a commune in the Gironde department
- Loupiac, Lot, a commune in the Lot department
- Loupiac, Tarn, a commune in the Tarn department
