= Château de Mayrac =

Coordinates: 44.8993°N 1.5587°E

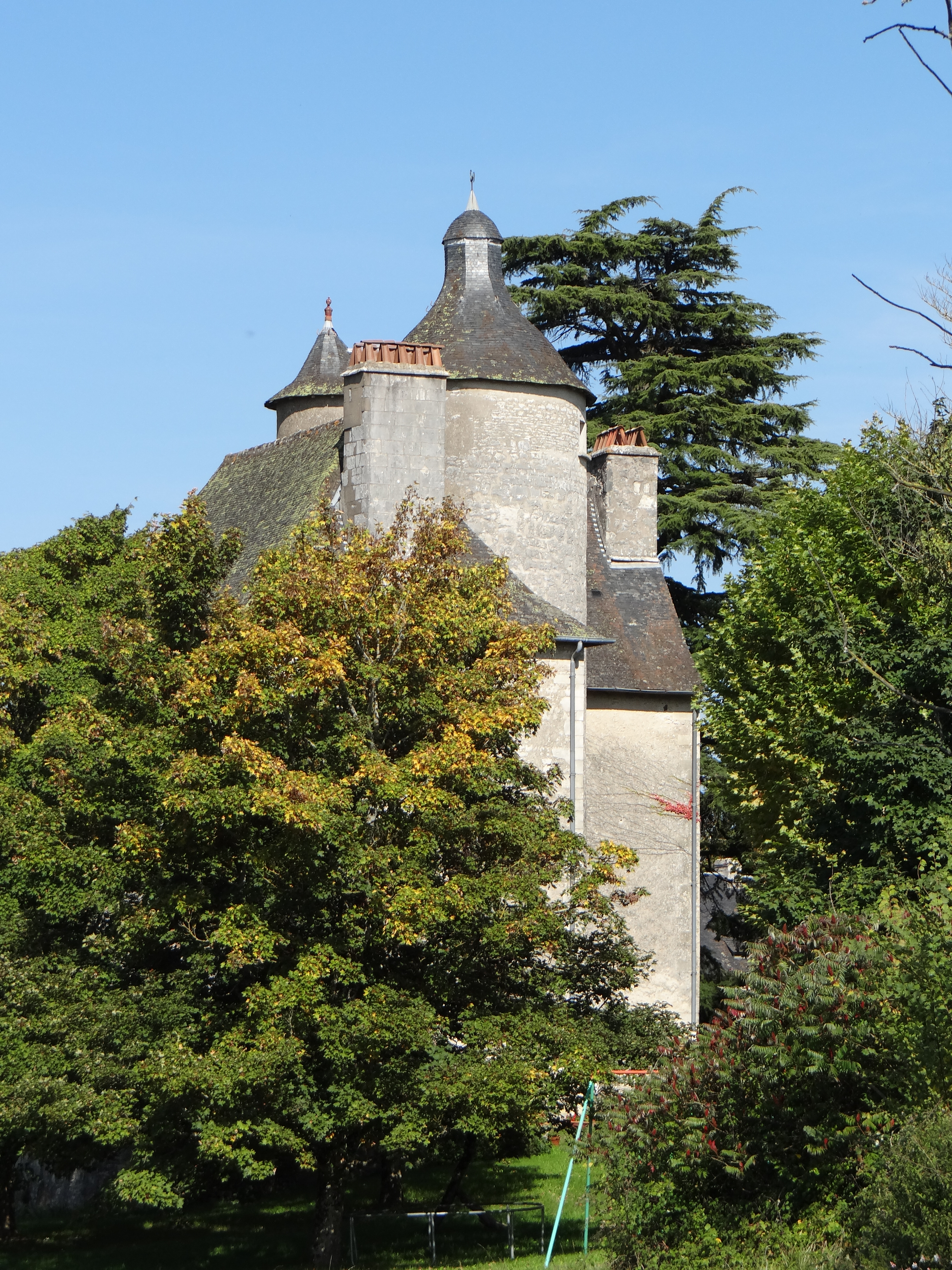
Château de Mayrac, overview from the south

The Château de Mayrac is a castle dating from the second half of the 15th century in the commune of Mayrac in the Lot département of France.

The castle comprises two corps de logis at right angles, linked by a round tower. The entrance is in the base of the tower, with profiled uprights resting on prismatic bases. The door is surmounted by an ogee and a pediment decorated with florets, accompanied on each side with pilasters. The castle's rooms are furnished with stone chimney places.

The Château de Mayrac is privately owned and is not open to the public. It has been listed since 1979 as a monument historique by the French Ministry of Culture.

== See also ==
- List of castles in France
