= Asthmaweed =

Asthmaweed is a common name for several plants and may refer to:

- Conyza bonariensis
- Conyza floribunda, native to South America
