= Meyronne =

- Commune
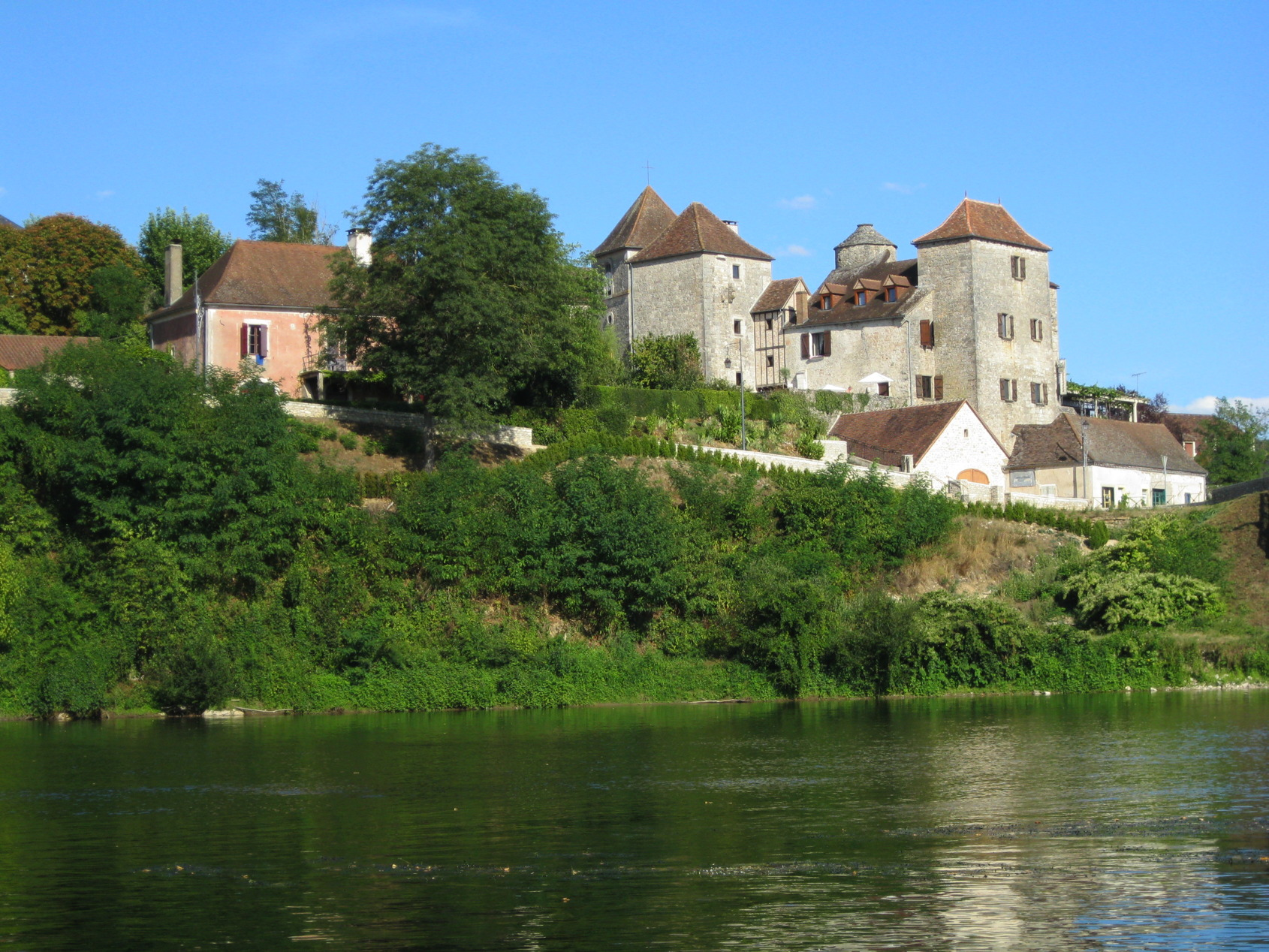
- A general view of Meyronne
- Location of Meyronne
- Location within France Location within Occitanie
- Coordinates: 44°52′40″N 1°34′42″E
- Country: France
- Region: Occitania
- Department: Lot
- Arrondissement: Gourdon
- Canton: Souillac
- Intercommunality: Causses et Vallée de la Dordogne

Government
  - Mayor (2020–2026): Jean-Luc Baladre
- Area^{1}: 8.04 km^{2} (3.10 sq mi)
- Elevation: 108 m (354 ft)
- Highest elevation: 285 m (935 ft)
- Lowest elevation: 90 m (300 ft)
- Population (2023): 269
  - Density: 33.5/km^{2} (86.7/sq mi)
- Time zone: UTC+01:00 (CET)
  - Summer (DST): UTC+02:00 (CEST)
- INSEE/Postal code: 46192 /46200
- ^{1} French Land Register data, which excludes lakes, ponds, glaciers > 1 km^{2} (0.386 sq mi or 247 acres) and river estuaries.

Meyronne (French pronunciation: [meʁɔn]; Occitan: Mairona) is a commune in the Lot department in south-western France.

== See also ==
- Communes of the Lot department
