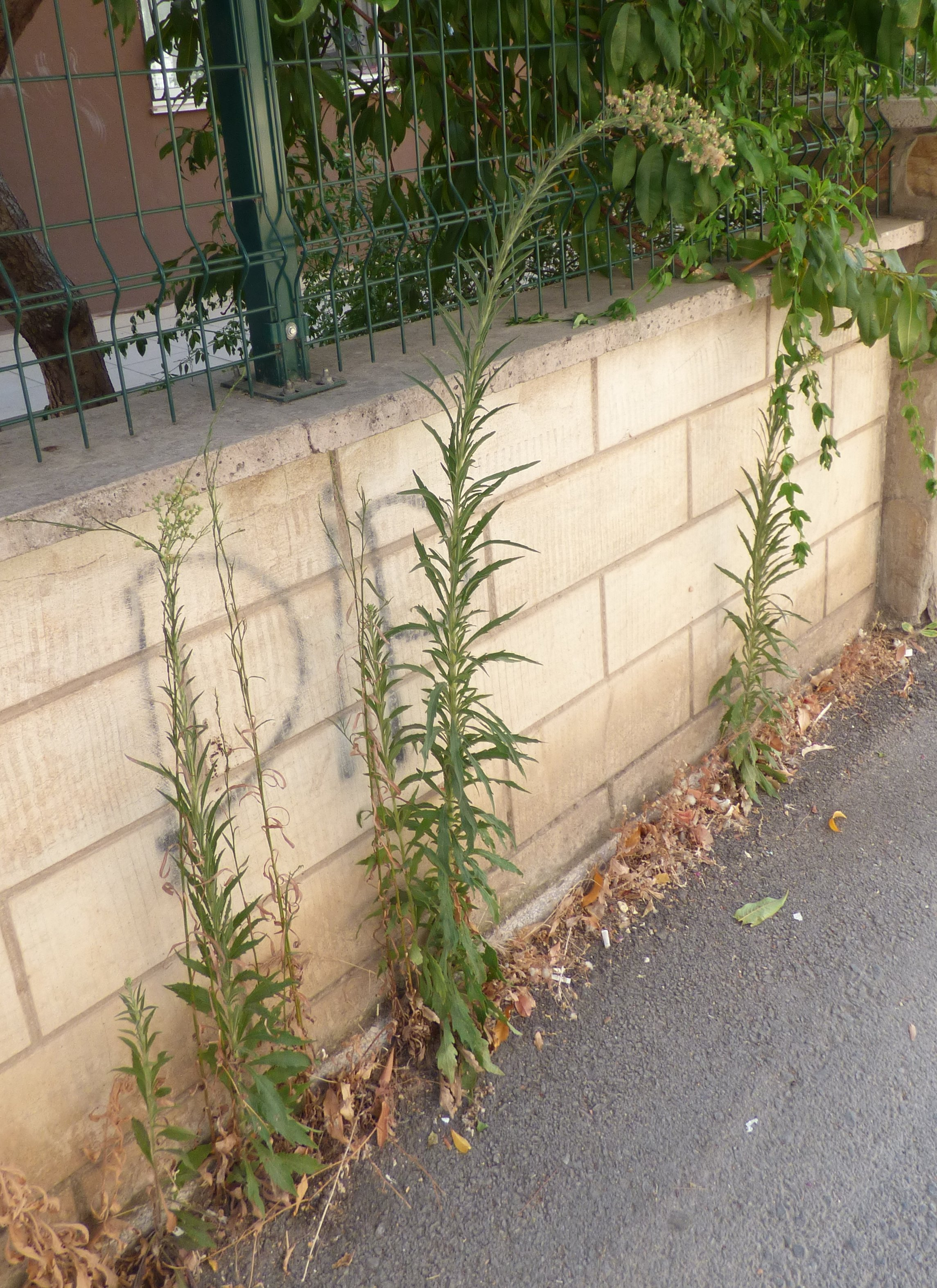

Scientific classification
- Kingdom: Plantae
- Clade: Tracheophytes
- Clade: Angiosperms
- Clade: Eudicots
- Clade: Asterids
- Order: Asterales
- Family: Asteraceae
- Genus: Erigeron
- Species: E. sumatrensis

Binomial name
- Erigeron sumatrensis Retz.

Synonyms
- List: Aster ambiguus E.H.L.Krause; Baccharis ivifolia Blanco; Conyza albida Willd. ex Spreng.; Conyza altissima Naudin ex Debeaux; Conyza ambigua DC.; Conyza bonariensis var. microcephala (Cabrera) Cabrera; Conyza bonariensis f. subleiotheca Cuatrec.; Conyza erigeroides DC.; Conyza floribunda var. subleiotheca (Cuatrec.) J.B.Marshall; Conyza groegeri V.M.Badillo; Conyza naudinii Bonnet; Conyza sumatrensis (Retz.) E.Walker; Dimorphanthes ambigua C.Presl; Dimorphanthes floribunda Cass.; Erigeron albidus (Willd. ex Spreng.) A.Gray; Erigeron ambiguus Sch.Bip.; Erigeron bonariensis var. microcephalus Cabrera; Erigeron crispus subsp. naudinii (Bonnet) Bonnier; Erigeron musashensis Makino; Erigeron naudinii (Bonnet) Humbert; Eschenbachia ambigua Moris

= Erigeron sumatrensis =

Species of flowering plant in the daisy family

Erigeron sumatrensis (syn. Conyza sumatrensis) is an annual herb probably native to South America, but widely naturalised in tropical and subtropical regions, and regarded as an invasive weed in many places.It is a perennial in the Western Cape of South Africa.

In the British Isles it is known as Guernsey fleabane. Other common names include fleabane, tall fleabane, broad-leaved fleabane, white horseweed, and Sumatran fleabane.

== Description ==
When fully grown (in summer or autumn), Erigeron sumatrensis reaches 1 to 2 metres (3.3 to 6.6 ft) in height. Flowers are white rather than purple-pink. Its leaves are like dandelion leaves, but longer, thinner and more like primrose leaves in colour and texture. Its seeding heads are like dandelions, but straw coloured and smaller. In certain countries the plant has started to exhibit resistance to herbicides.

== Distribution ==
It probably originates from South America, but is now naturalised in North America, Europe, Africa, Asia, and Australasia. It poses a significant threat to wildlife conservation areas and other reserves. In Britain, of the non-native former Conyza species, it is the second most abundant (after Erigeron canadensis) and is typically found in London and the South East of England. It was first recorded in London by Brian Wurzell in 1984, and noted in France at Saint-Sozy (Dordogne) in 2006.

== Taxonomic note ==
Older literature such as Flora of Turkey may quote Conyza albida Willd. ex Spreng. intending what is now E. sumatrensis Retz., and should be taken as such; likewise other literature references may do so; the type has subsequently been revised and Conyza albida Willd. ex Spreng. is now viewed as a synonym for Erigeron floribundus (Kunth) Sch.Bip.

== Photographic description ==
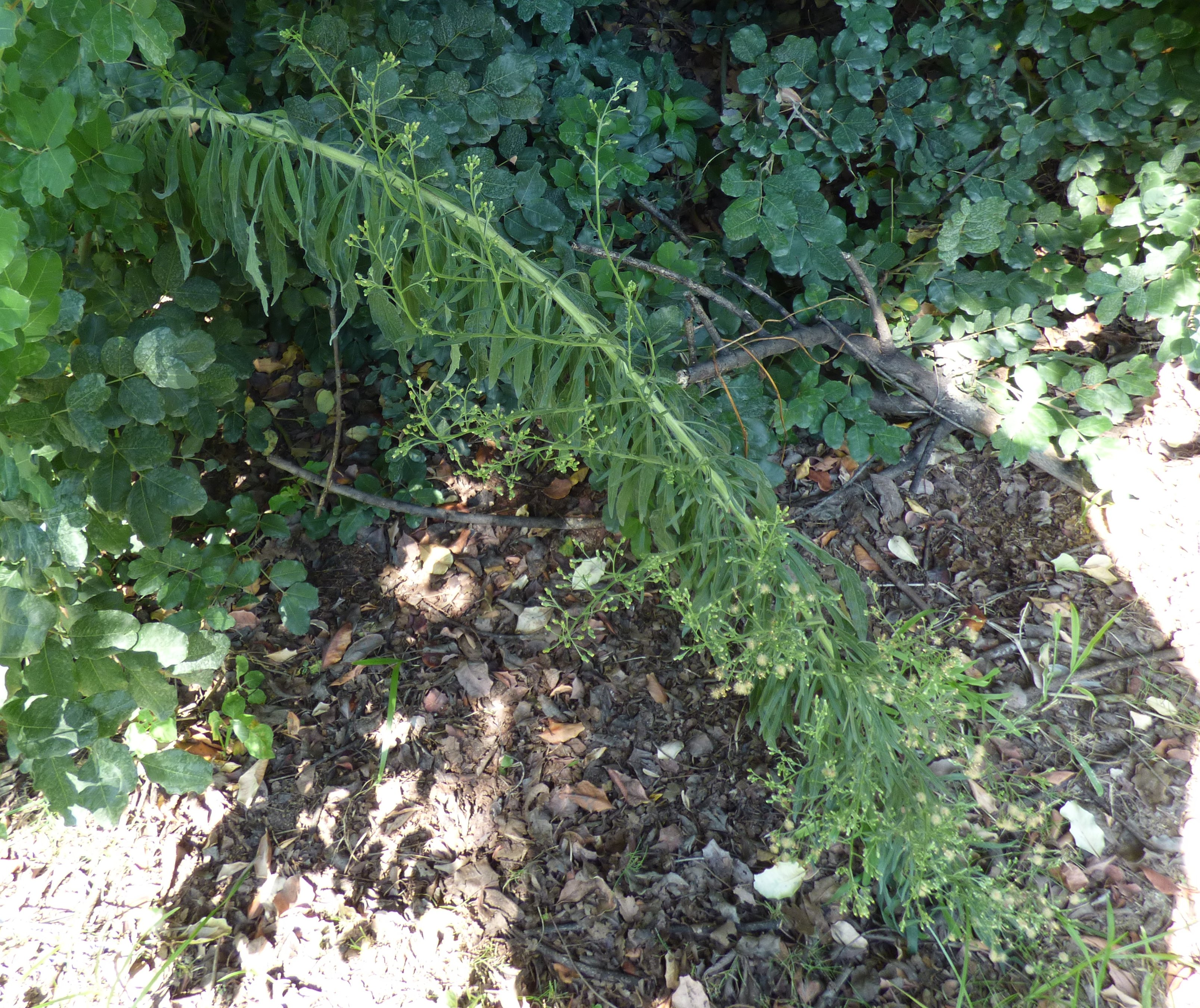
Tall and tending to end up leaning over

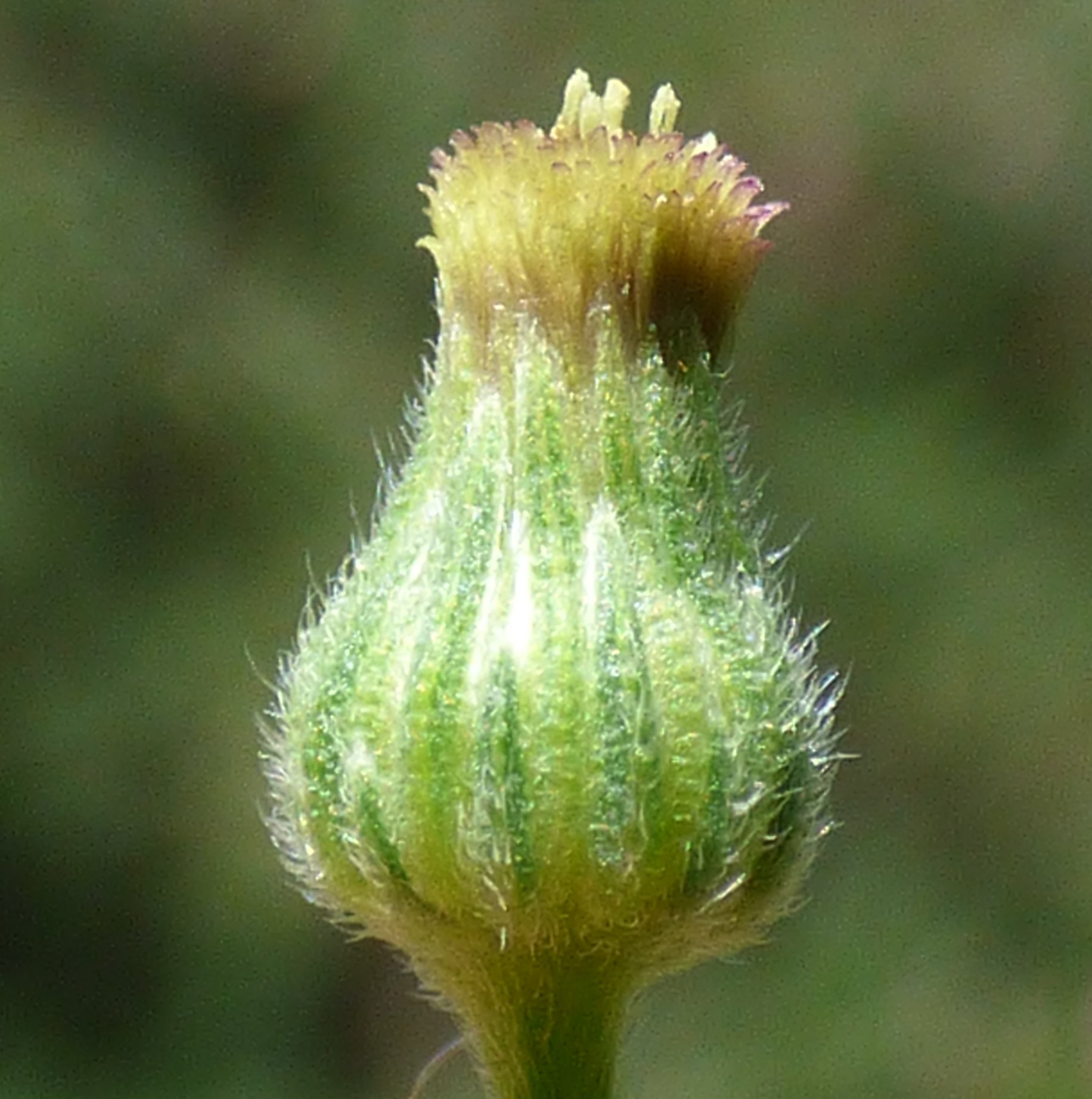
Side phyllaries hairy and green, without red tips, and lacks prominent white petals, which may have a purple tinge

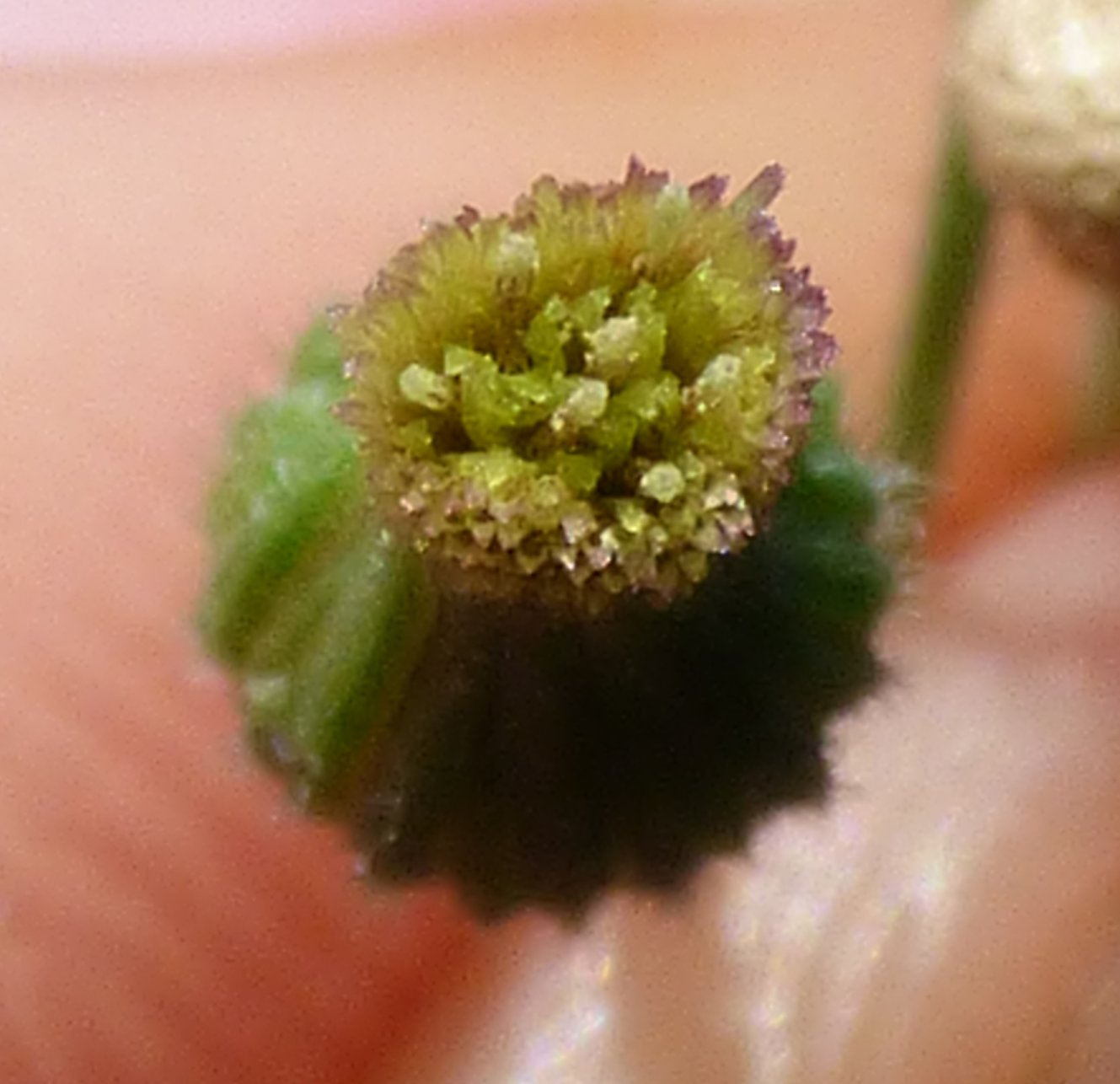
Head from above, ray petals with purple tinge

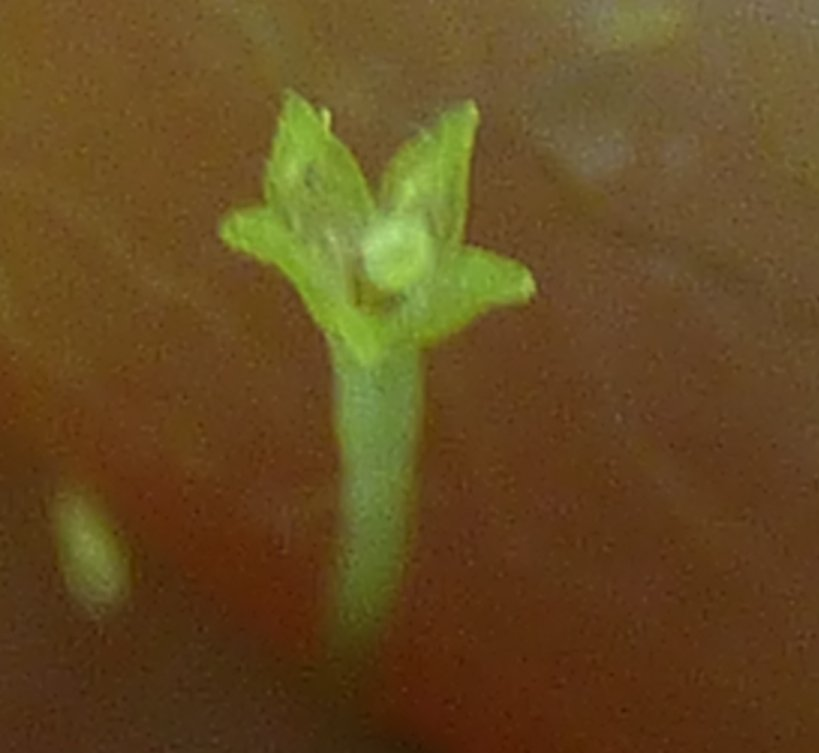
Individual flower from within head, 5-petalled

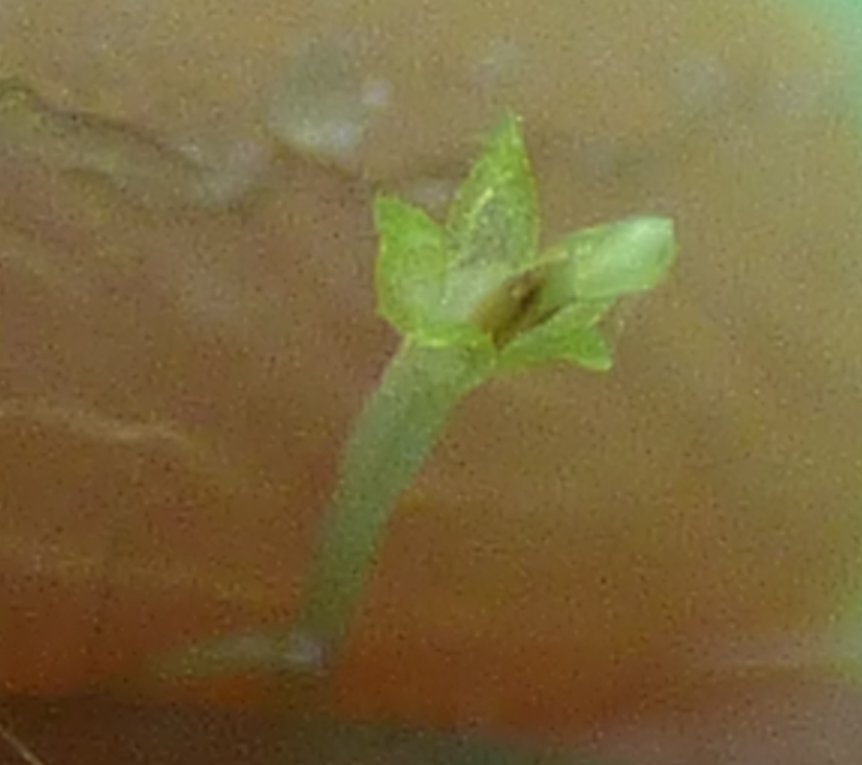
Individual flower from within head, 5-petalled

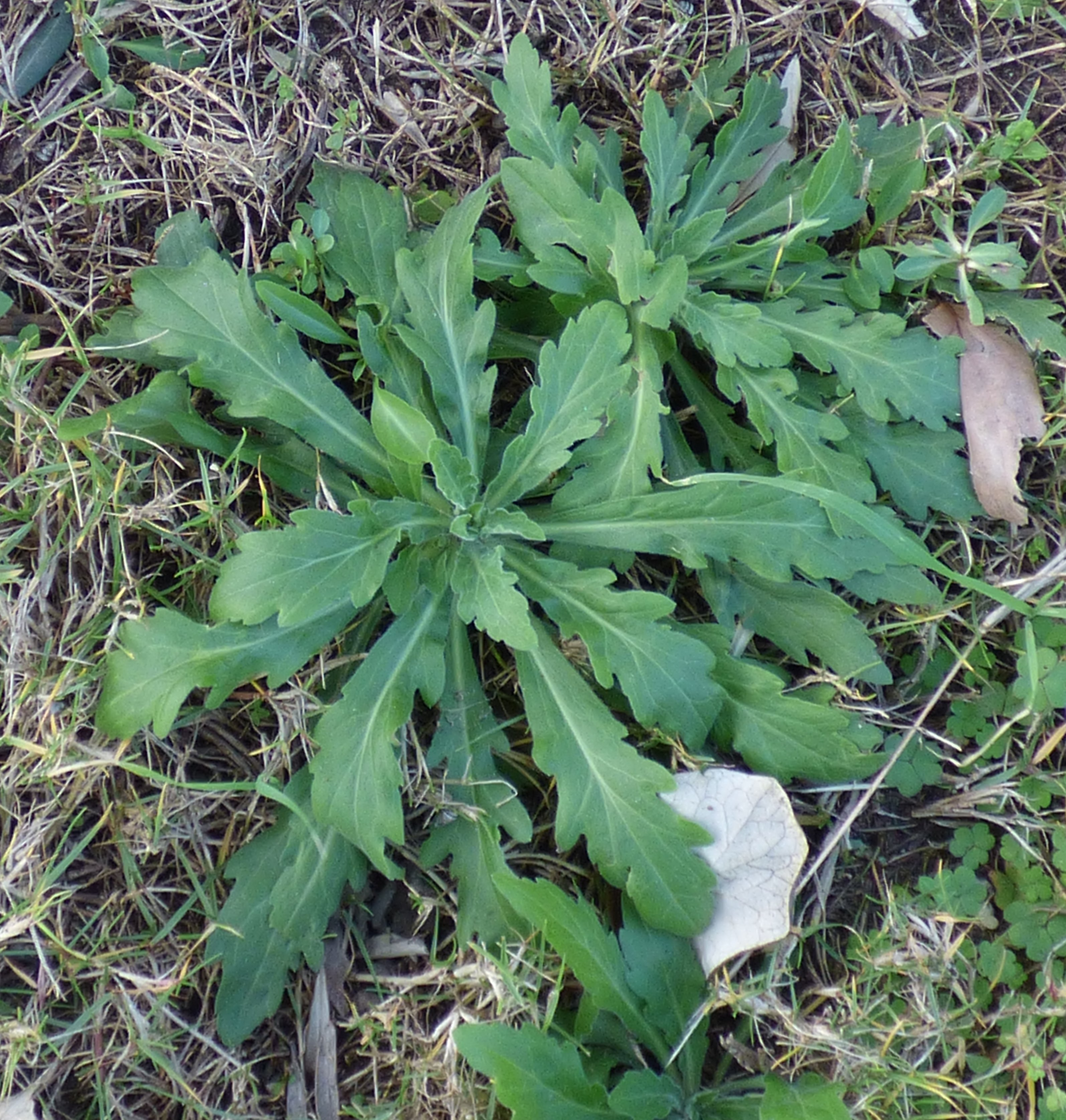
Base leaves quite broad, lobey and hairy, but green-looking not conspicuously grey

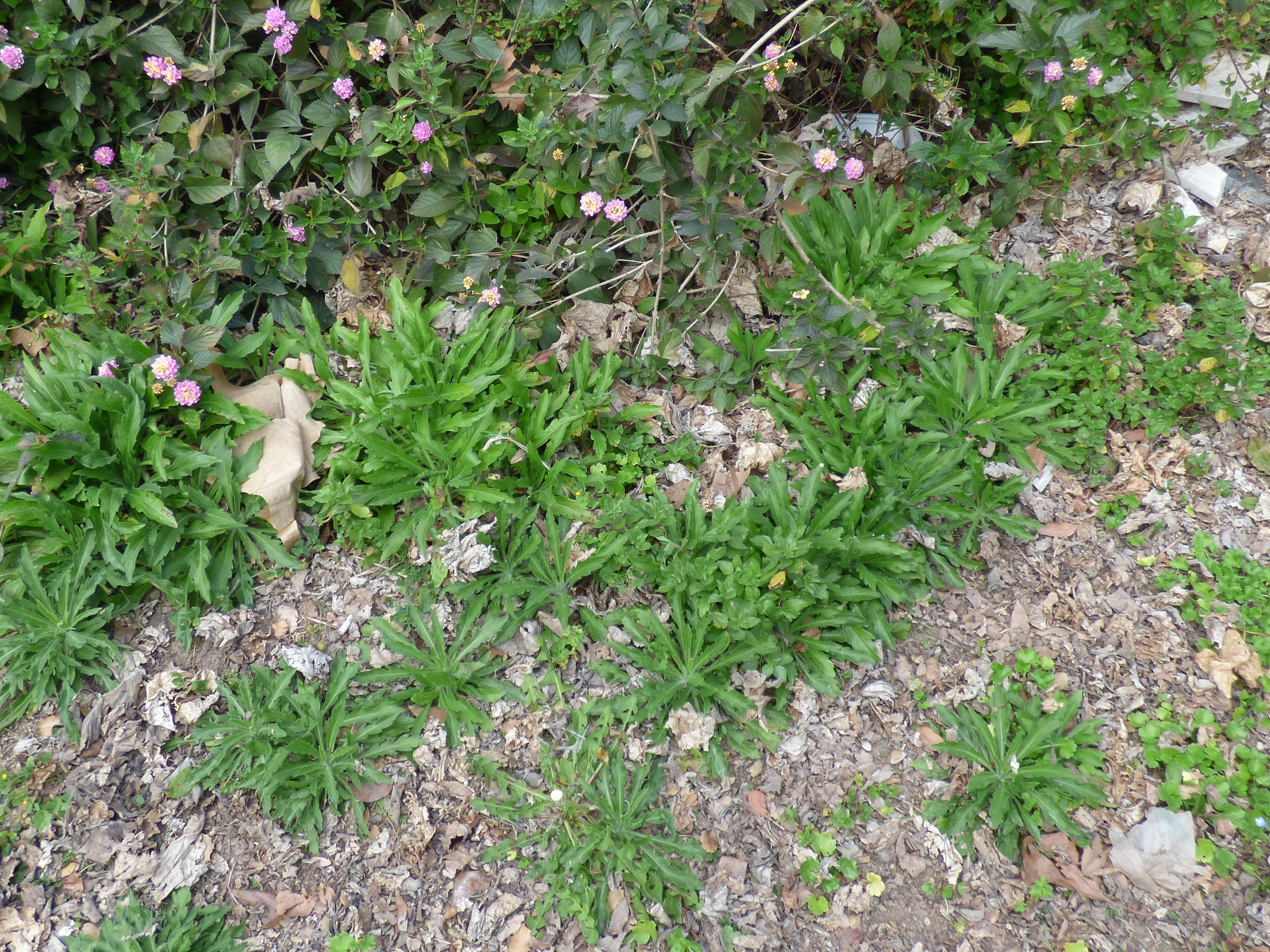
Colony of rosettes

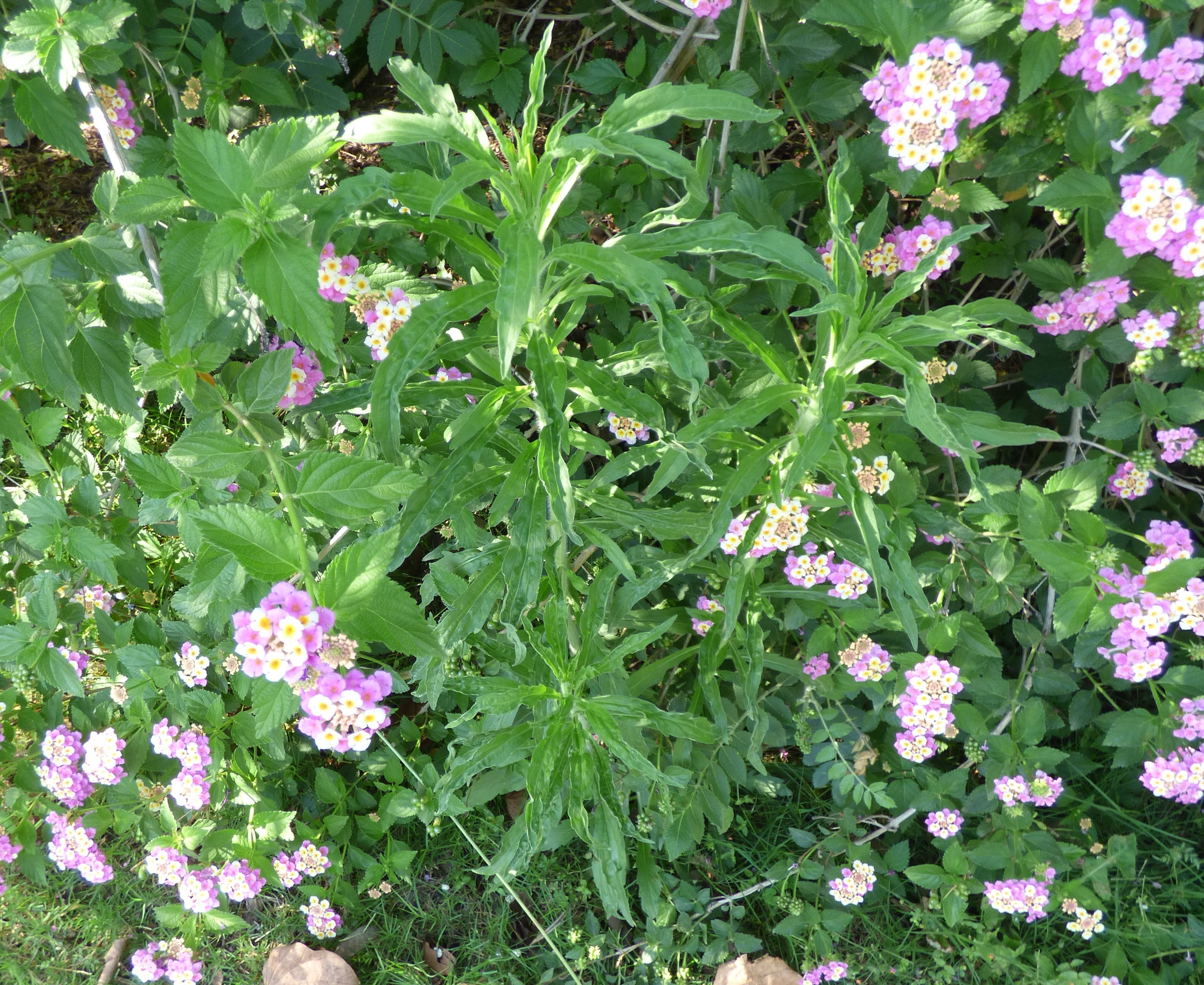
Emerging plant, green-looking

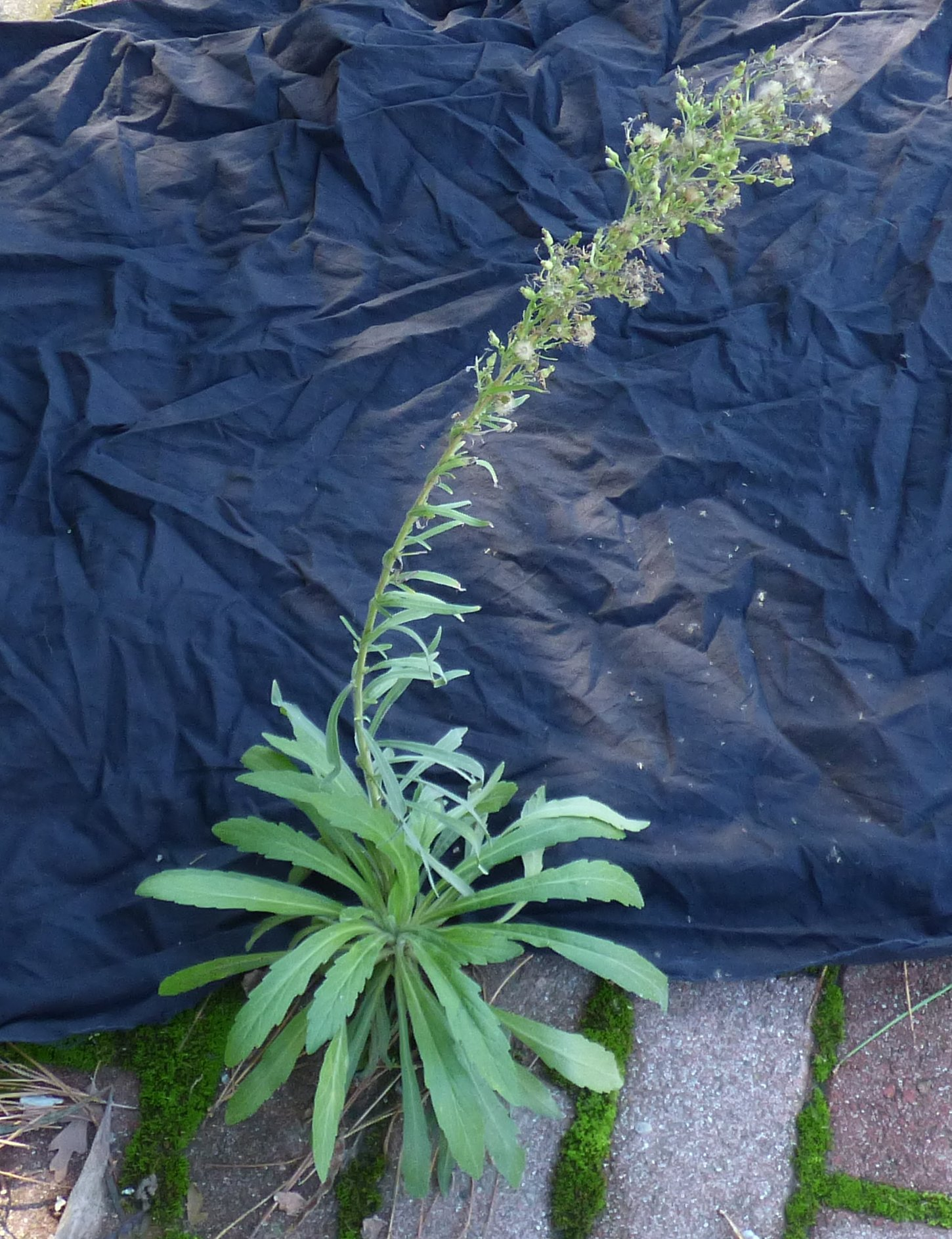
Flowering whilst still small

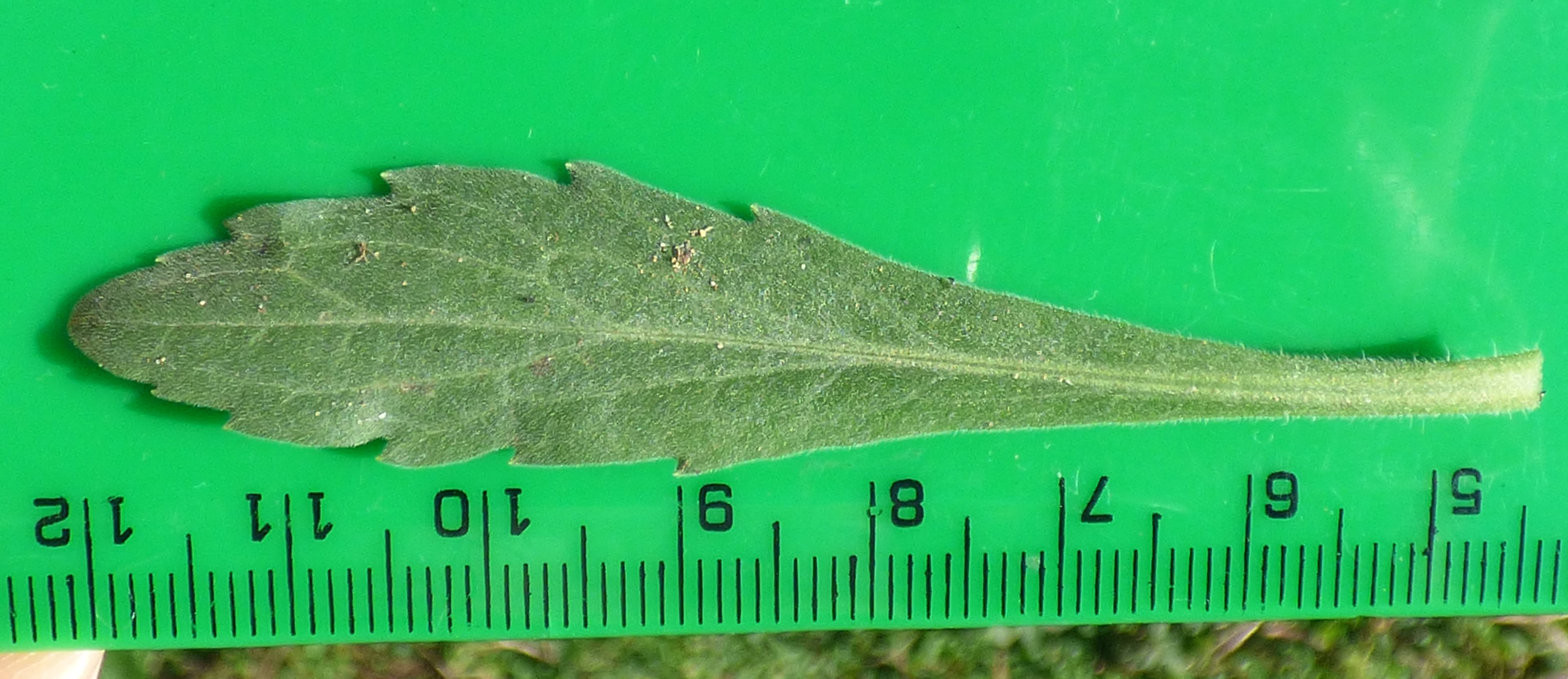
Stem leaf

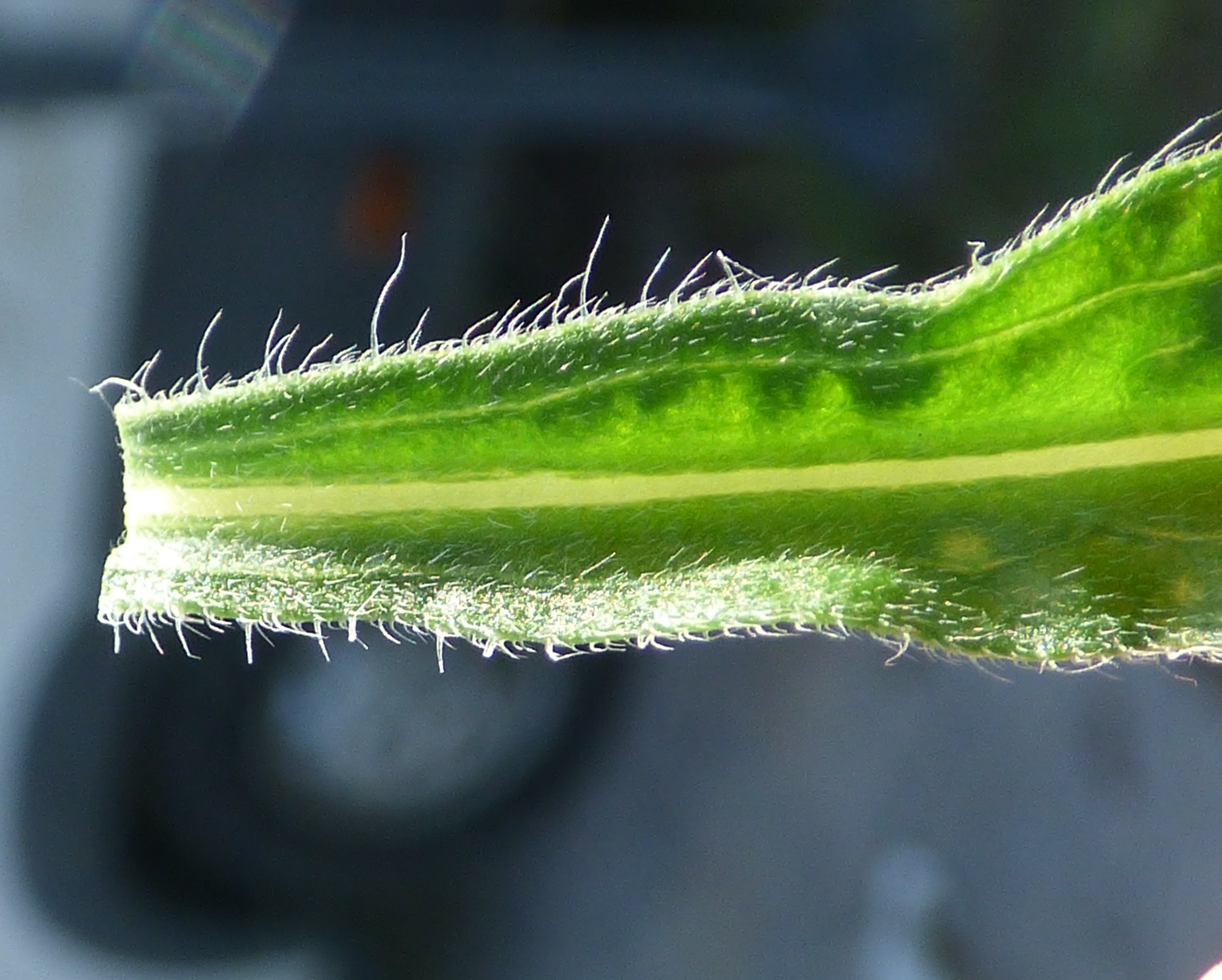
Stem leaf base

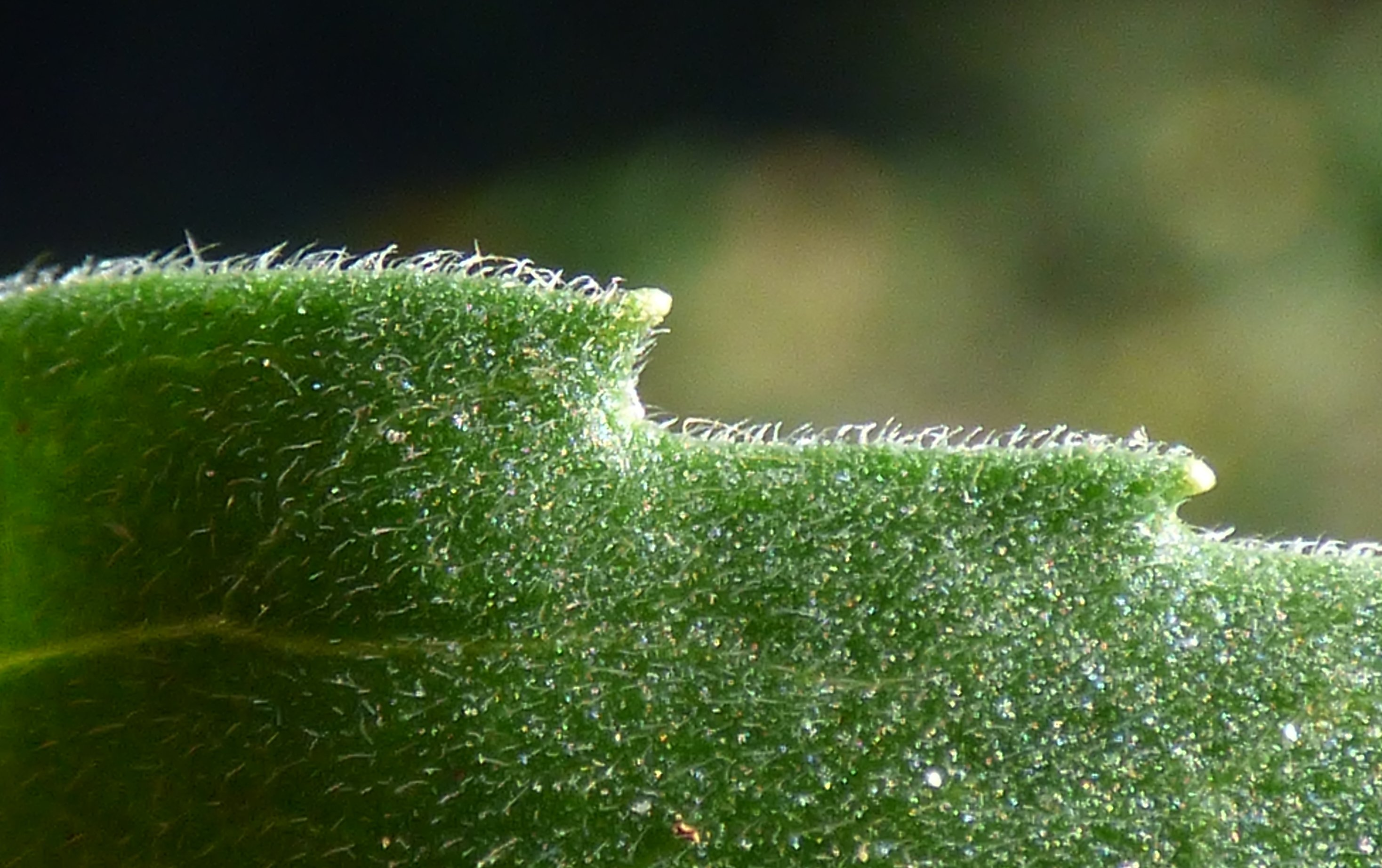
Stem leaf near tip

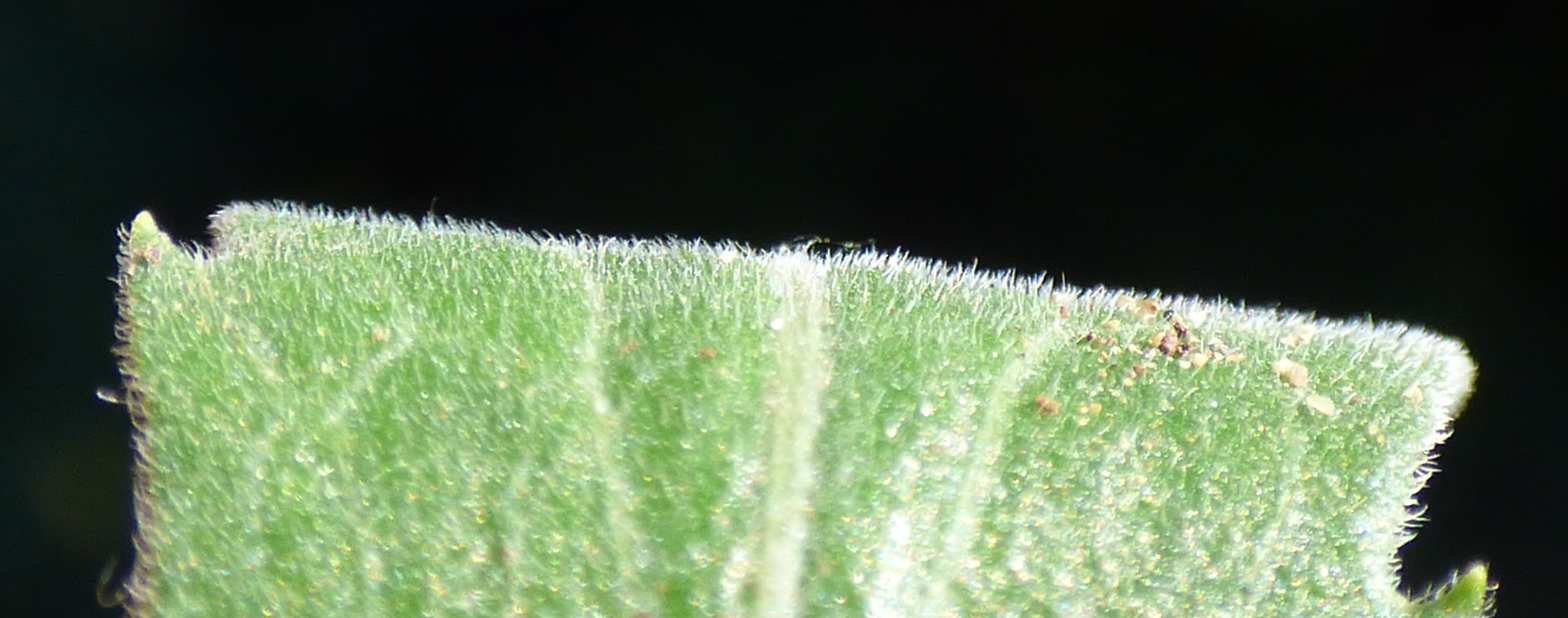
Stem leaf underside

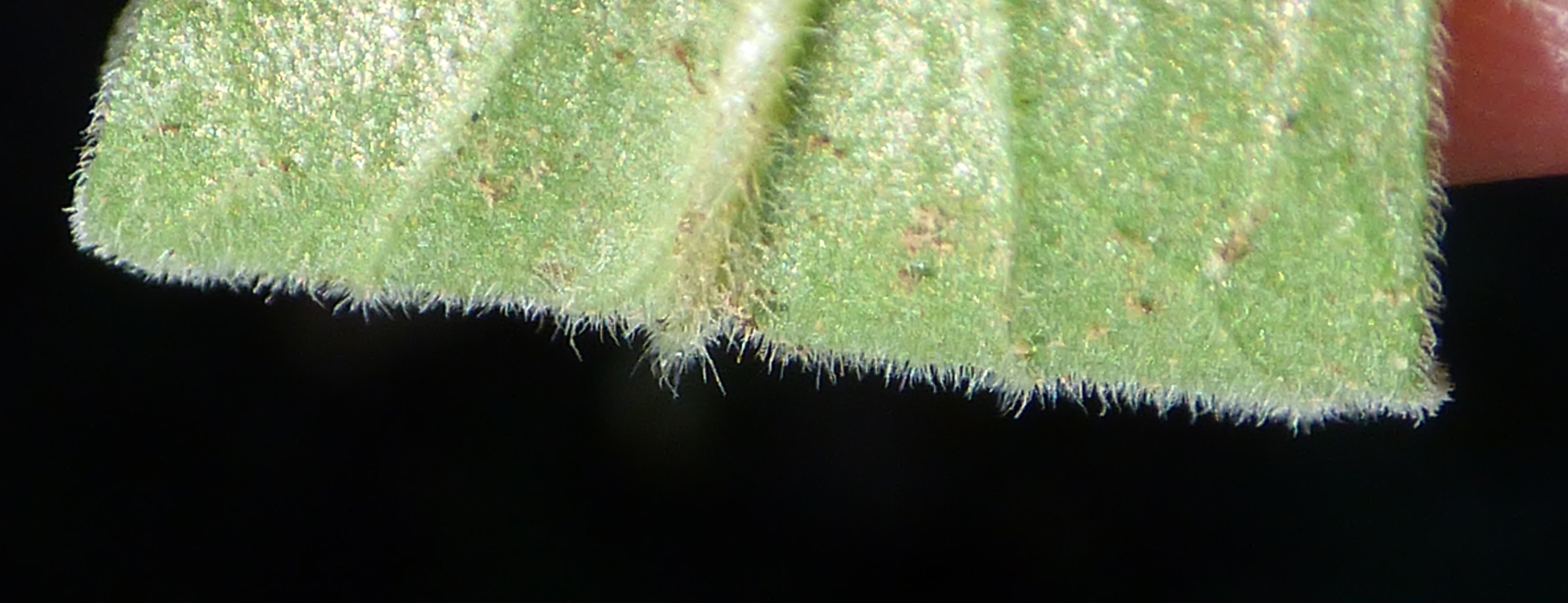
Stem leaf underside

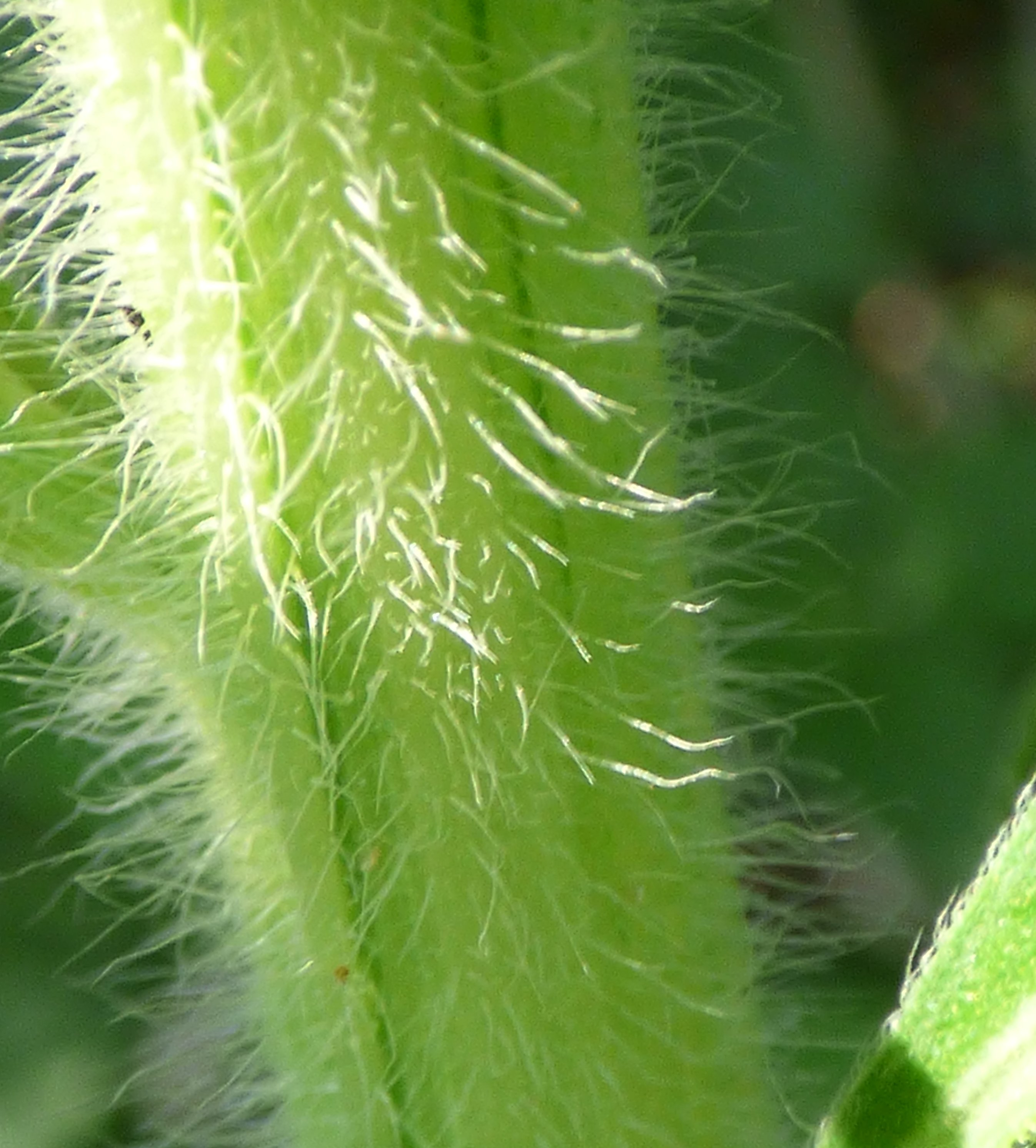
Stem

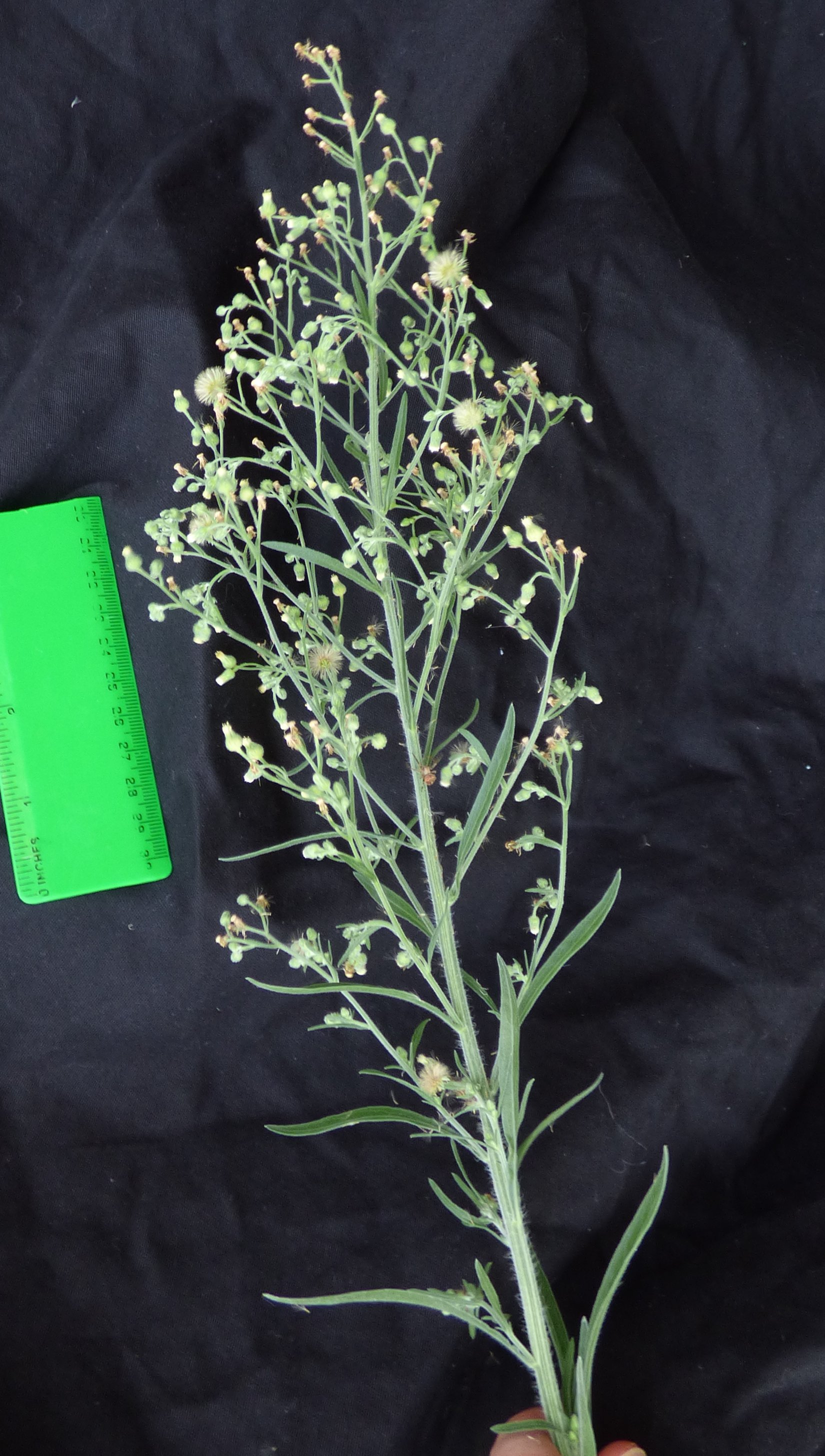
Inflorescence prior to heads expanding with pappus

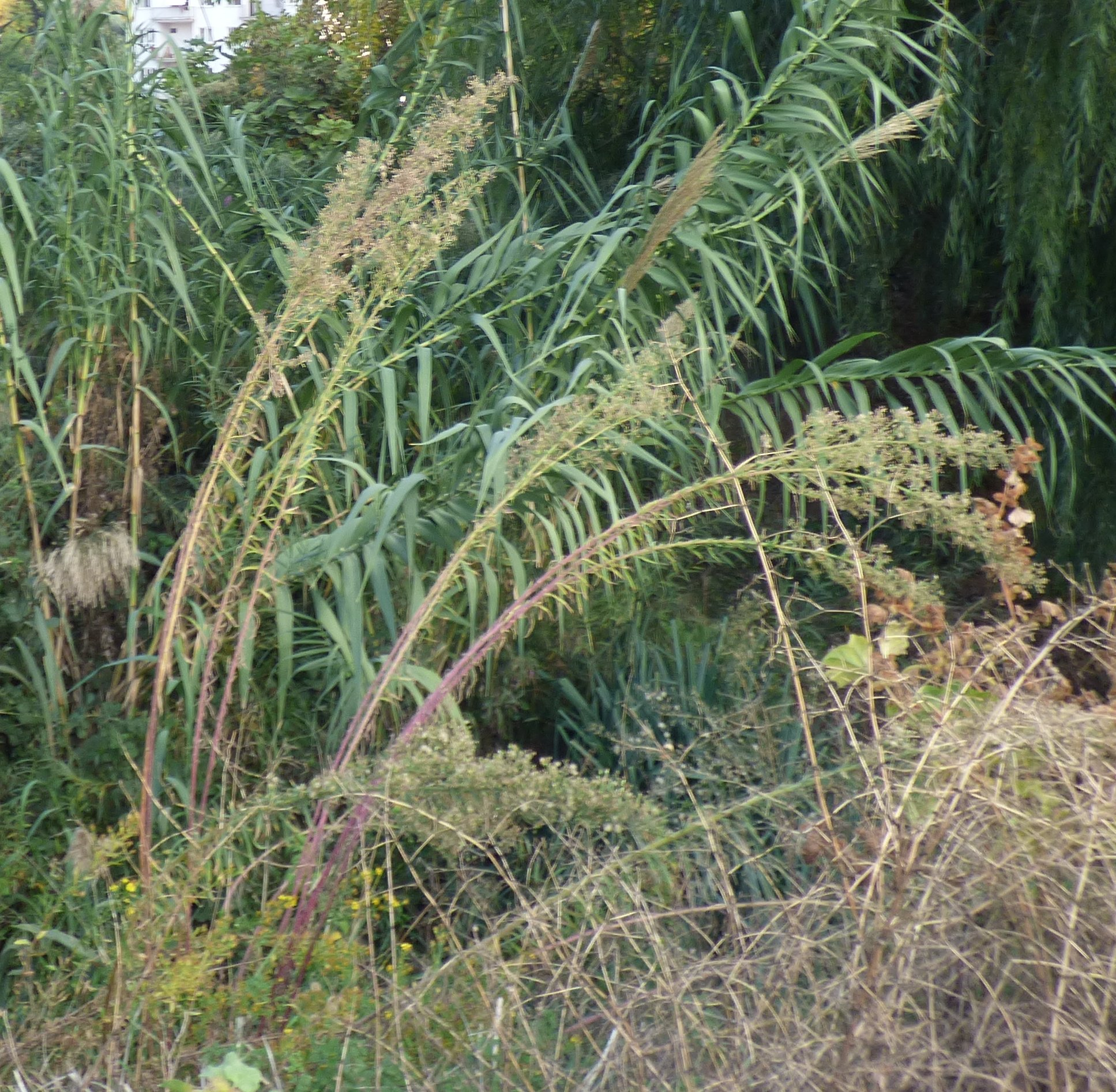
Seeding

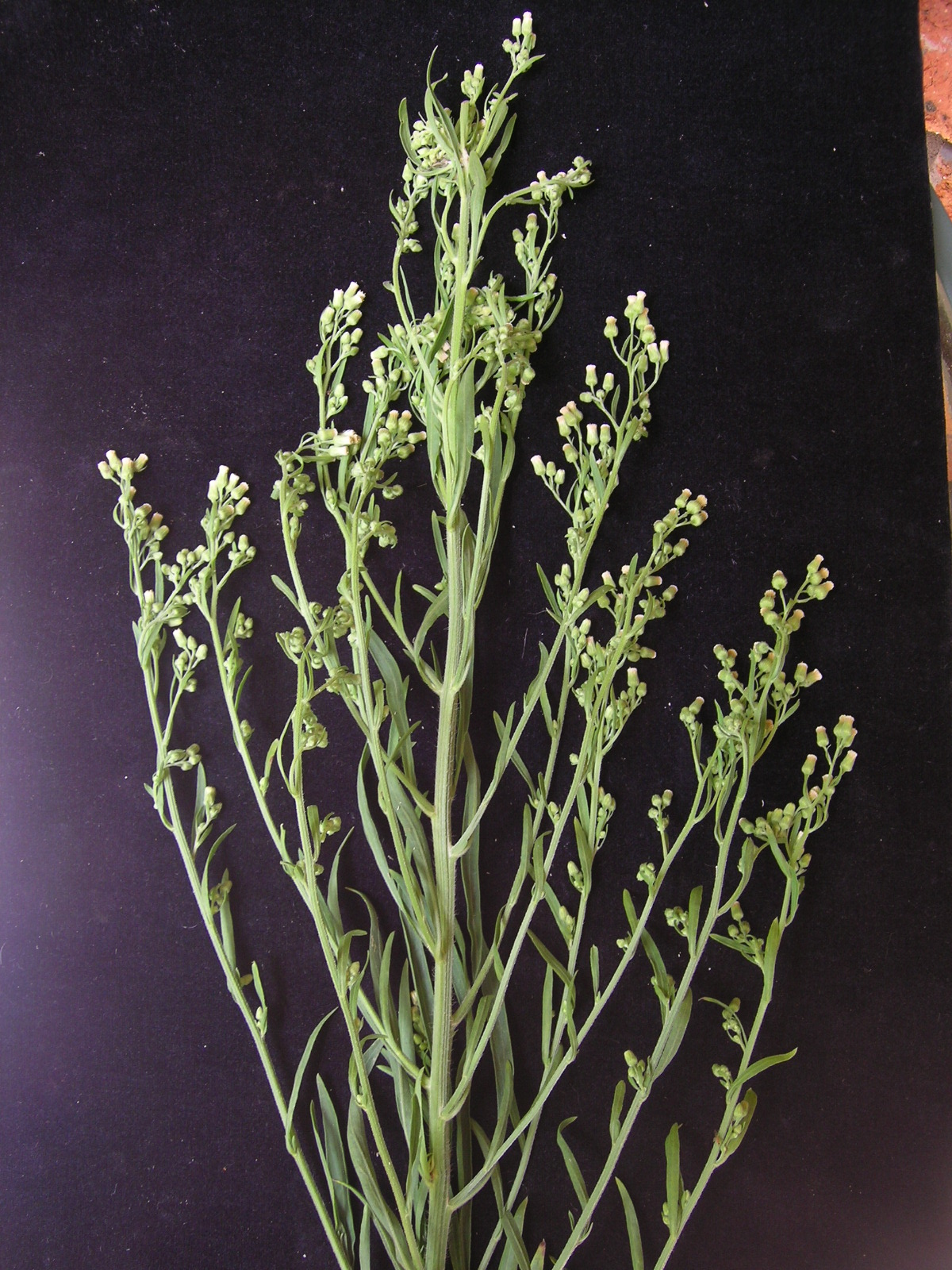

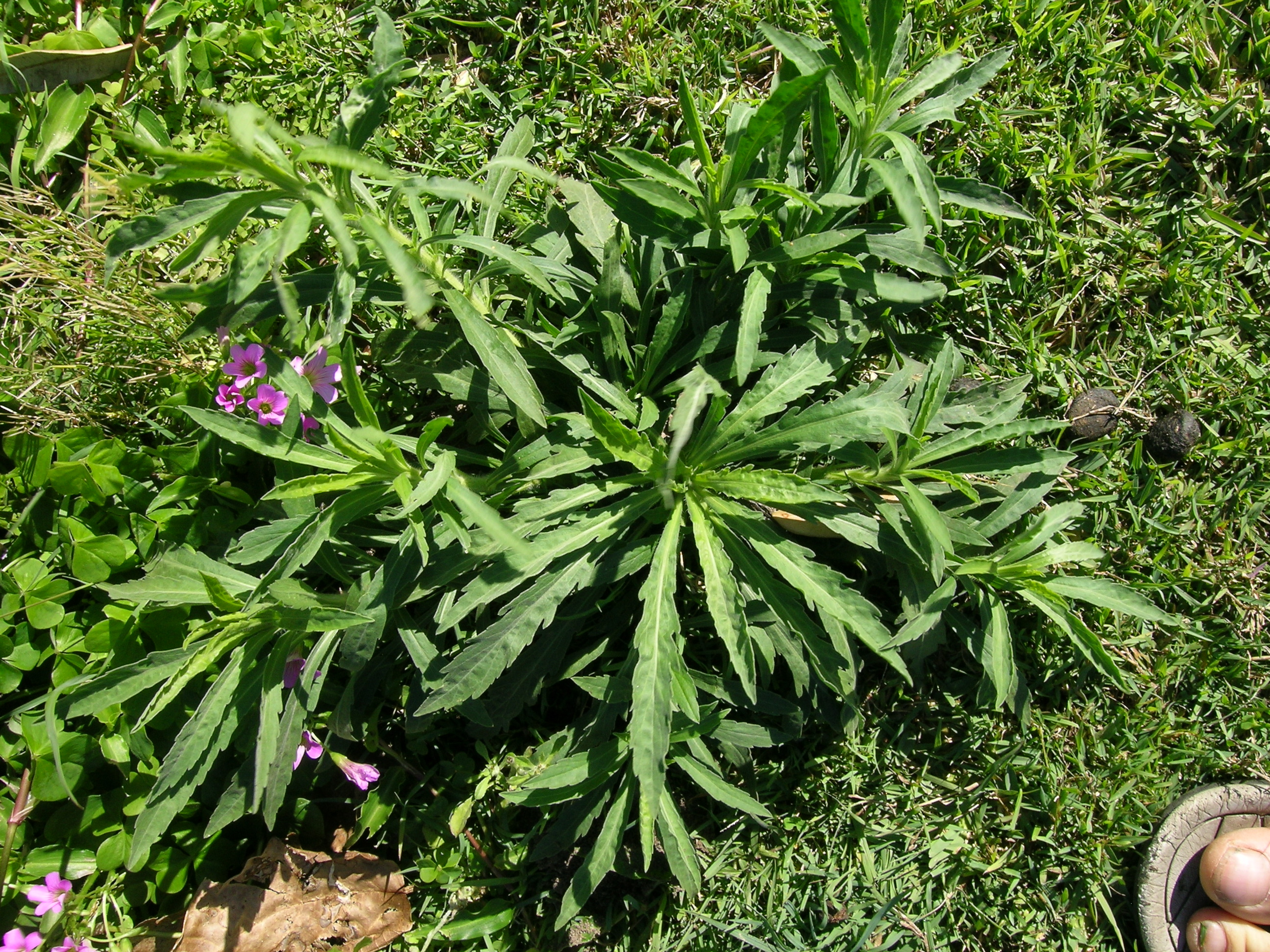

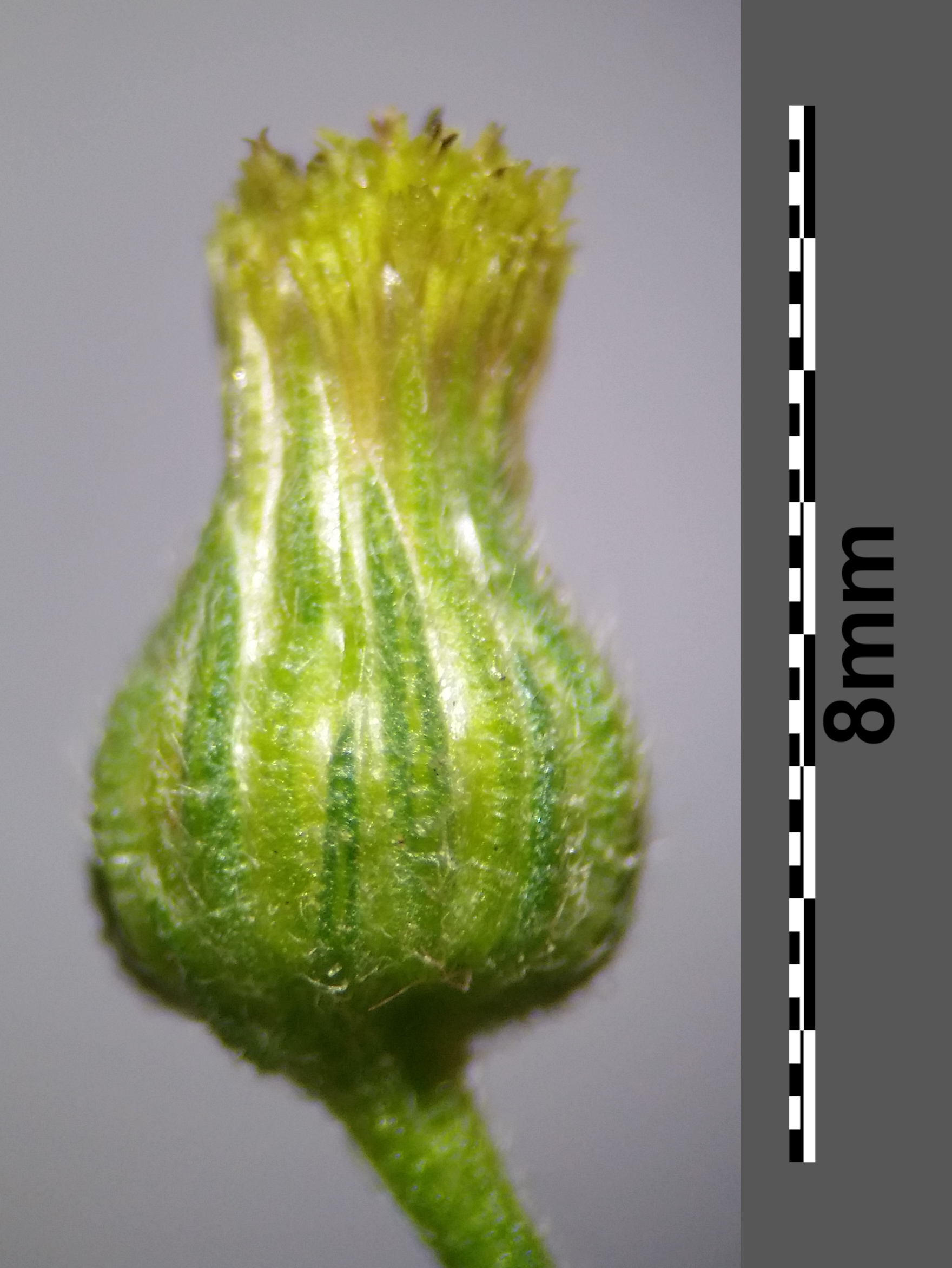
