= Canton of Souillac =

Coordinates: 44.89°N 1.48°E

The canton of Souillac is an administrative division of the Lot department, southern France. Its borders were modified at the French canton reorganisation which came into effect in March 2015. Its seat is in Souillac.

It consists of the following communes:

1. Calès
2. Fajoles
3. Gignac
4. Lacave
5. Lachapelle-Auzac
6. Lamothe-Fénelon
7. Lanzac
8. Le Roc
9. Loupiac
10. Masclat
11. Mayrac
12. Meyronne
13. Nadaillac-de-Rouge
14. Payrac
15. Pinsac
16. Reilhaguet
17. Saint-Sozy
18. Souillac
