= Fajoles =

- Commune
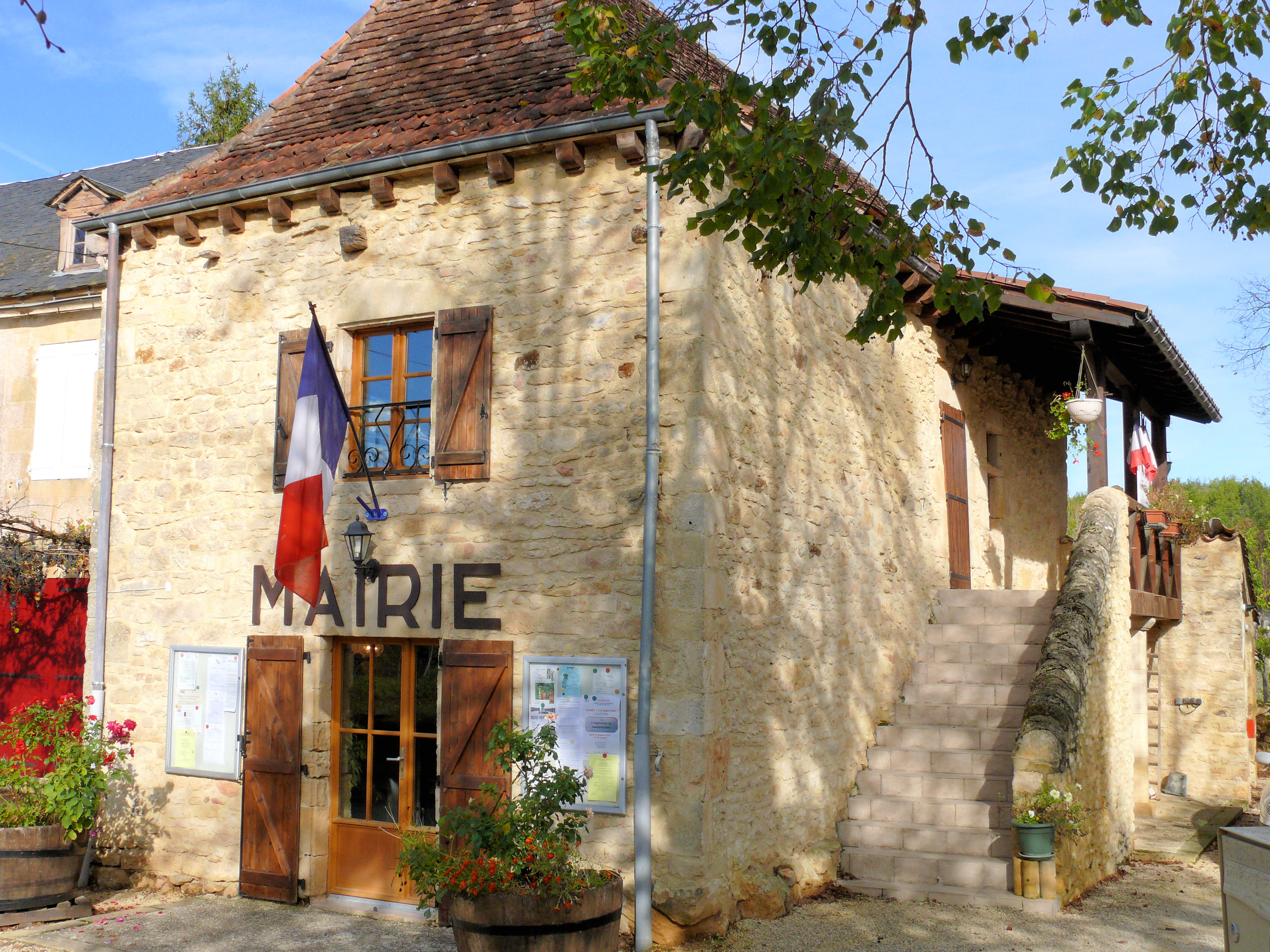
- The town hall in Fajoles
- Location of Fajoles
- Location within France Location within Occitanie
- Coordinates: 44°48′14″N 1°23′50″E
- Country: France
- Region: Occitania
- Department: Lot
- Arrondissement: Gourdon
- Canton: Souillac

Government
  - Mayor (2020–2026): Fabienne Lalande
- Area^{1}: 8.98 km^{2} (3.47 sq mi)
- Highest elevation: 213 m (699 ft)
- Lowest elevation: 118 m (387 ft)
- Population (2023): 319
  - Density: 35.5/km^{2} (92.0/sq mi)
- Time zone: UTC+01:00 (CET)
  - Summer (DST): UTC+02:00 (CEST)
- INSEE/Postal code: 46098 /46300
- ^{1} French Land Register data, which excludes lakes, ponds, glaciers > 1 km^{2} (0.386 sq mi or 247 acres) and river estuaries.

Fajoles (French pronunciation: [faʒɔl]; Occitan: Fajòlas) is a commune in the Lot department in south-western France.

== See also ==
- Communes of the Lot department
