= Calès, Lot =

Calès
- Commune
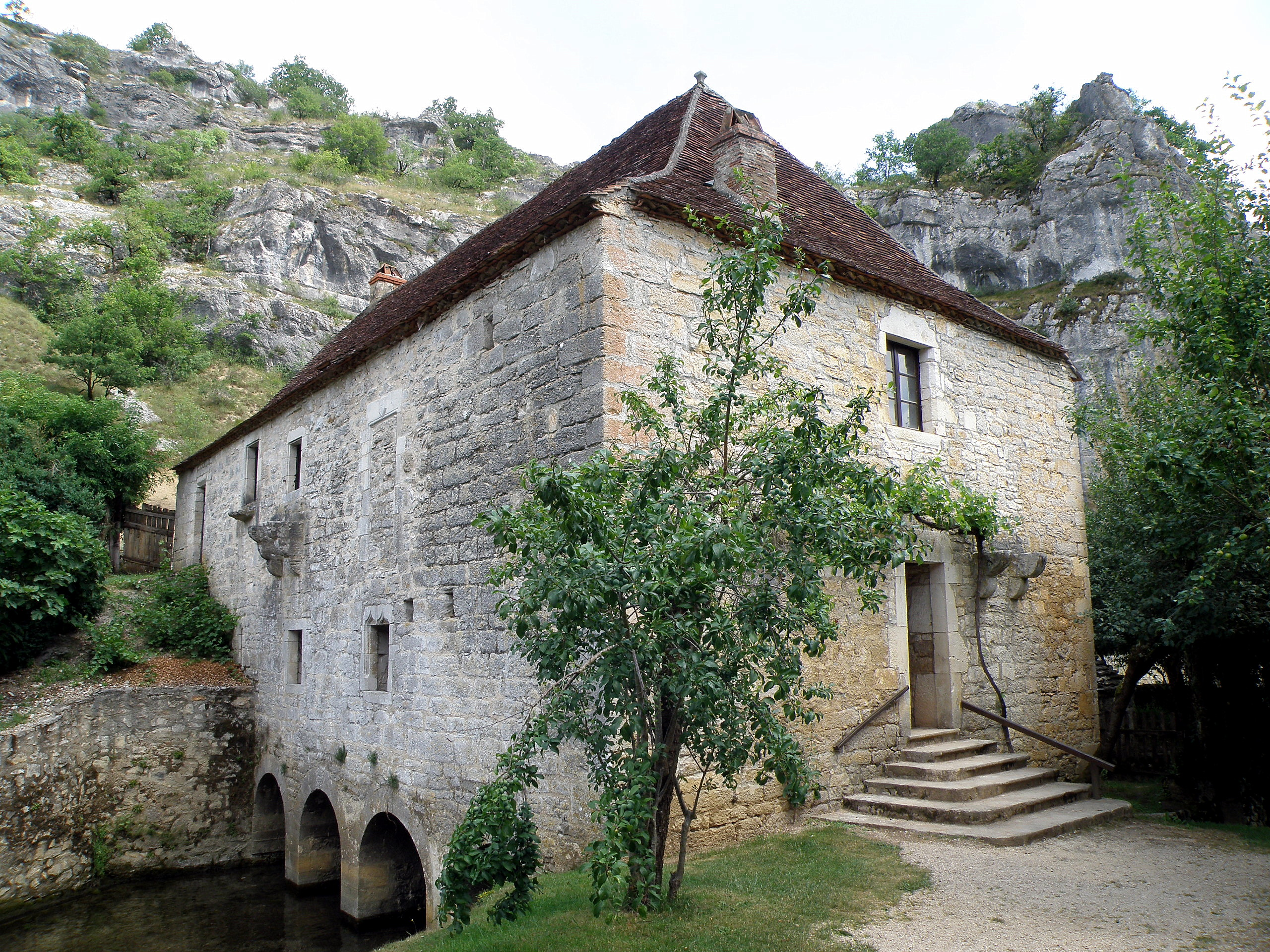
- Cougnaguet Mill, in Calès
- Location of Calès
- Location within France Location within Occitanie
- Coordinates: 44°48′48″N 1°32′19″E
- Country: France
- Region: Occitania
- Department: Lot
- Arrondissement: Gourdon
- Canton: Souillac
- Intercommunality: Causses et Vallée de la Dordogne

Government
  - Mayor (2020–2026): Jean-François Poncelet
- Area^{1}: 34.23 km^{2} (13.22 sq mi)
- Elevation: 277 m (909 ft)
- Highest elevation: 295 m (968 ft)
- Lowest elevation: 99 m (325 ft)
- Population (2023): 169
  - Density: 4.94/km^{2} (12.8/sq mi)
- Time zone: UTC+01:00 (CET)
  - Summer (DST): UTC+02:00 (CEST)
- INSEE/Postal code: 46047 /46350
- ^{1} French Land Register data, which excludes lakes, ponds, glaciers > 1 km^{2} (0.386 sq mi or 247 acres) and river estuaries.

Calès (French pronunciation: [kalɛs]; Occitan: Calés) is a commune in the Lot department in south-western France.

== See also ==
- Communes of the Lot department
