= Lanzac =

- Commune
- Location of Lanzac
- Location within France Location within Occitanie
- Coordinates: 44°52′31″N 1°29′01″E
- Country: France
- Region: Occitania
- Department: Lot
- Arrondissement: Gourdon
- Canton: Souillac
- Intercommunality: Causses et Vallée de la Dordogne

Government
  - Mayor (2020–2026): Jean-Claude Fouche
- Area^{1}: 14.62 km^{2} (5.64 sq mi)
- Elevation: 100 m (330 ft)
- Highest elevation: 330 m (1,080 ft)
- Lowest elevation: 80 m (260 ft)
- Population (2023): 563
  - Density: 38.5/km^{2} (99.7/sq mi)
- Time zone: UTC+01:00 (CET)
  - Summer (DST): UTC+02:00 (CEST)
- INSEE/Postal code: 46153 /46200
- ^{1} French Land Register data, which excludes lakes, ponds, glaciers > 1 km^{2} (0.386 sq mi or 247 acres) and river estuaries.

Lanzac (French pronunciation: [lɑ̃zak]) is a commune in the Lot department in south-western France.

== See also ==
- Communes of the Lot department
