= Nadaillac-de-Rouge =

- Commune
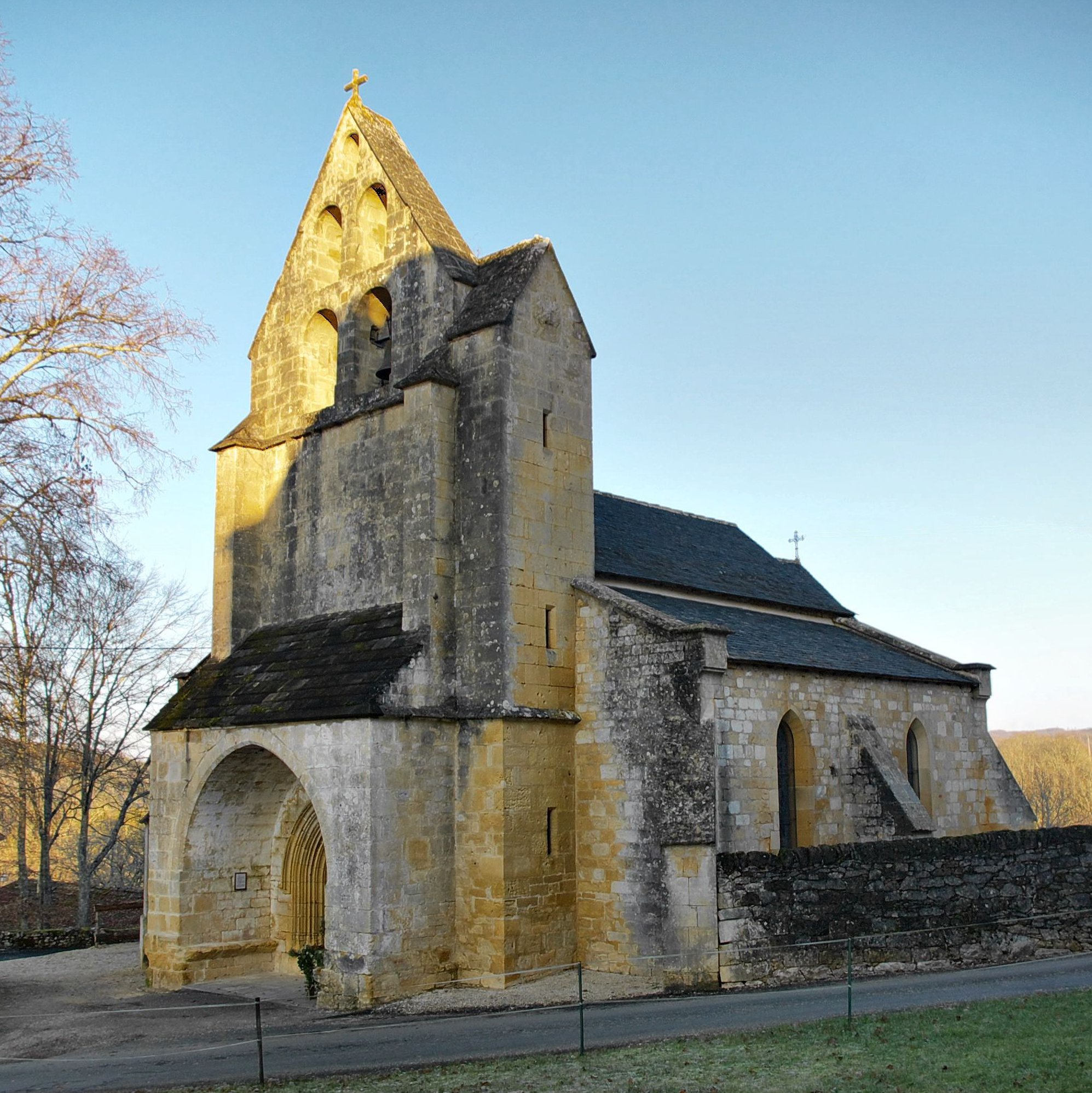
- The church in Nadaillac-de-Rouge
- Location of Nadaillac-de-Rouge
- Location within France Location within Occitanie
- Coordinates: 44°51′00″N 1°25′47″E
- Country: France
- Region: Occitania
- Department: Lot
- Arrondissement: Gourdon
- Canton: Souillac
- Intercommunality: Causses et Vallée de la Dordogne

Government
  - Mayor (2020–2026): Francis Chastrusse
- Area^{1}: 7.73 km^{2} (2.98 sq mi)
- Elevation: 180 m (590 ft)
- Highest elevation: 273 m (896 ft)
- Lowest elevation: 86 m (282 ft)
- Population (2023): 180
  - Density: 23/km^{2} (60/sq mi)
- Time zone: UTC+01:00 (CET)
  - Summer (DST): UTC+02:00 (CEST)
- INSEE/Postal code: 46209 /46350
- ^{1} French Land Register data, which excludes lakes, ponds, glaciers > 1 km^{2} (0.386 sq mi or 247 acres) and river estuaries.

Nadaillac-de-Rouge (French pronunciation: [nadajak də ʁuʒ]; Languedocien: Nadalhac) is a commune in the Lot department in south-western France.

== Population ==
Historical population
Year	Pop.	±% p.a.
1968	89	—
1975	86	−0.49%
1982	92	+0.97%
1990	96	+0.53%
1999	101	+0.57%
2007	172	+6.88%
2012	174	+0.23%
2017	159	−1.79%
2023	180	+2.09%
Source: INSEE

== See also ==
- Communes of the Lot department
