= Lachapelle-Auzac =

- Commune
- Location of Lachapelle-Auzac
- Location within France Location within Occitanie
- Coordinates: 44°54′33″N 1°28′24″E
- Country: France
- Region: Occitania
- Department: Lot
- Arrondissement: Gourdon
- Canton: Souillac
- Intercommunality: Causses et Vallée de la Dordogne

Government
  - Mayor (2020–2026): Ernest Maury
- Area^{1}: 31.34 km^{2} (12.10 sq mi)
- Elevation: 132 m (433 ft)
- Highest elevation: 312 m (1,024 ft)
- Lowest elevation: 100 m (330 ft)
- Population (2023): 795
  - Density: 25.4/km^{2} (65.7/sq mi)
- Time zone: UTC+01:00 (CET)
  - Summer (DST): UTC+02:00 (CEST)
- INSEE/Postal code: 46145 /46200
- ^{1} French Land Register data, which excludes lakes, ponds, glaciers > 1 km^{2} (0.386 sq mi or 247 acres) and river estuaries.

Lachapelle-Auzac (French pronunciation: [laʃapɛl ozak]; Occitan: La Capèla Ausac) is a commune in the Lot department in south-western France.

== See also ==
- Communes of the Lot department
