= Mayrac =

- Commune
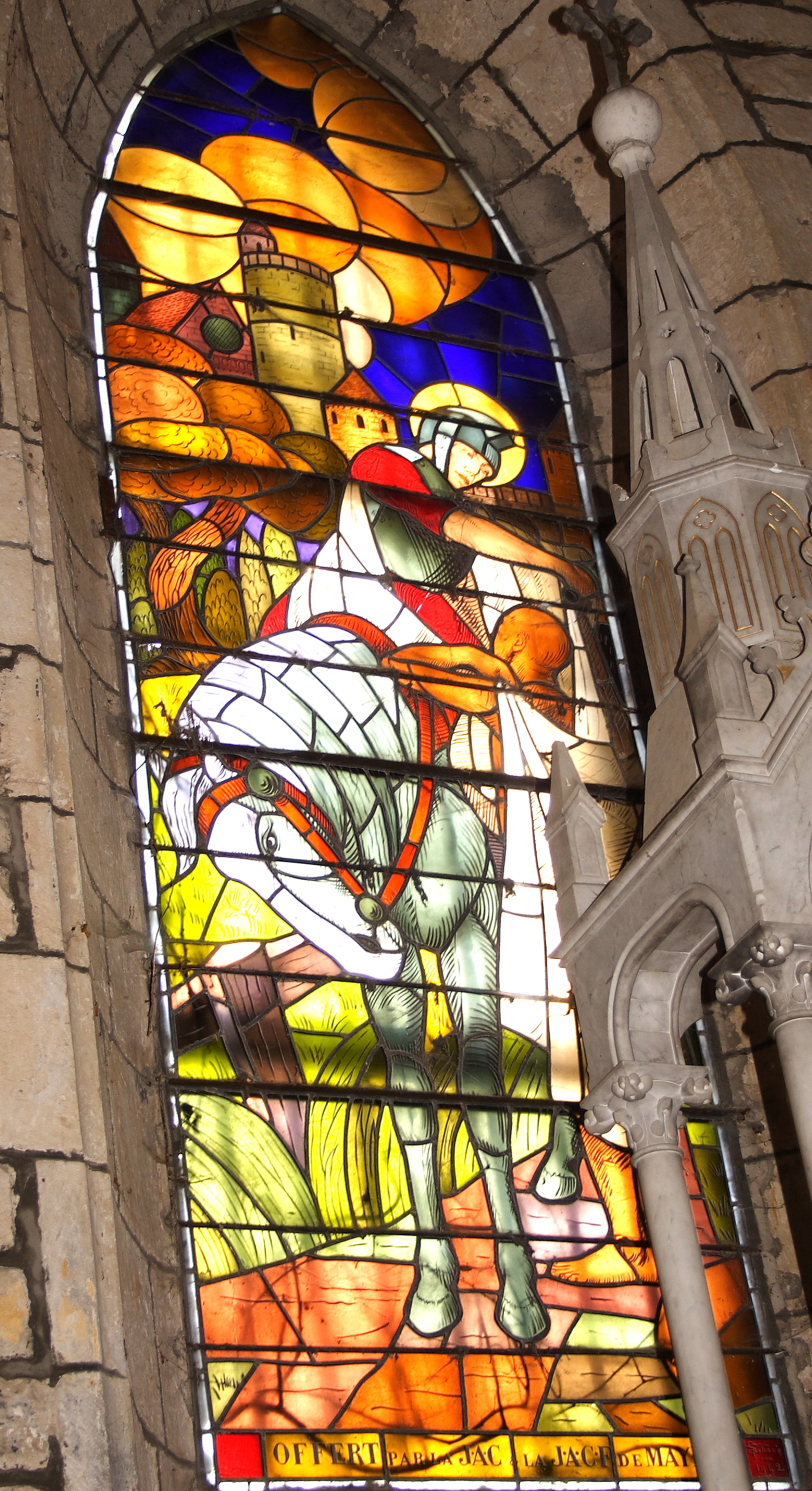
- A stained-glass window, inside the church of Mayrac, of Saint Martin sharing his coat by Georges Lebacq
- Location of Mayrac
- Location within France Location within Occitanie
- Coordinates: 44°53′59″N 1°33′33″E
- Country: France
- Region: Occitania
- Department: Lot
- Arrondissement: Gourdon
- Canton: Souillac
- Intercommunality: Causses et Vallée de la Dordogne

Government
  - Mayor (2020–2026): Christophe Lacarrière
- Area^{1}: 7.86 km^{2} (3.03 sq mi)
- Elevation: 180 m (590 ft)
- Highest elevation: 287 m (942 ft)
- Lowest elevation: 120 m (390 ft)
- Population (2023): 254
  - Density: 32.3/km^{2} (83.7/sq mi)
- Time zone: UTC+01:00 (CET)
  - Summer (DST): UTC+02:00 (CEST)
- INSEE/Postal code: 46337 /46200
- ^{1} French Land Register data, which excludes lakes, ponds, glaciers > 1 km^{2} (0.386 sq mi or 247 acres) and river estuaries.

Mayrac (French pronunciation: [mɛjʁak]; Languedocien: Mairac) is a commune in the Lot department in south-western France.

== See also ==
- Communes of the Lot department
