= Le Roc =

- Commune
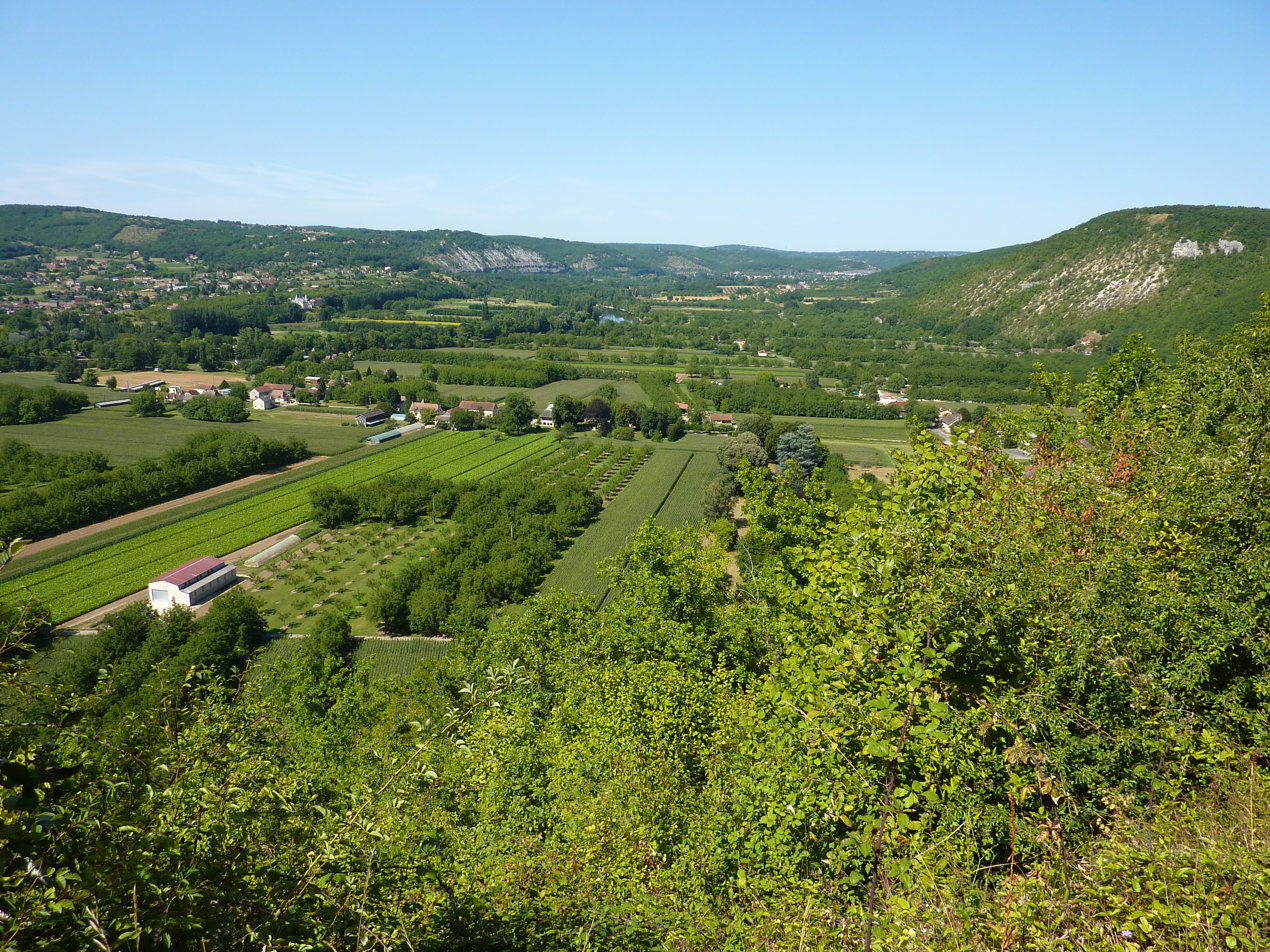
- The Dordogne Valley at Le Roc
- Location of Le Roc
- Location within France Location within Occitanie
- Coordinates: 44°52′02″N 1°26′30″E
- Country: France
- Region: Occitania
- Department: Lot
- Arrondissement: Gourdon
- Canton: Souillac

Government
  - Mayor (2020–2026): Franck Idee
- Area^{1}: 6.95 km^{2} (2.68 sq mi)
- Elevation: 65 m (213 ft)
- Highest elevation: 324 m (1,063 ft)
- Lowest elevation: 84 m (276 ft)
- Population (2023): 207
  - Density: 29.8/km^{2} (77.1/sq mi)
- Time zone: UTC+01:00 (CET)
  - Summer (DST): UTC+02:00 (CEST)
- INSEE/Postal code: 46239 /46200
- ^{1} French Land Register data, which excludes lakes, ponds, glaciers > 1 km^{2} (0.386 sq mi or 247 acres) and river estuaries.

Le Roc (French pronunciation: [lə ʁɔk]; Occitan: Lo Ròc) is a commune in the Lot department in south-western France.

== See also ==
- Communes of the Lot department
