= Lamothe-Fénelon =

- Commune
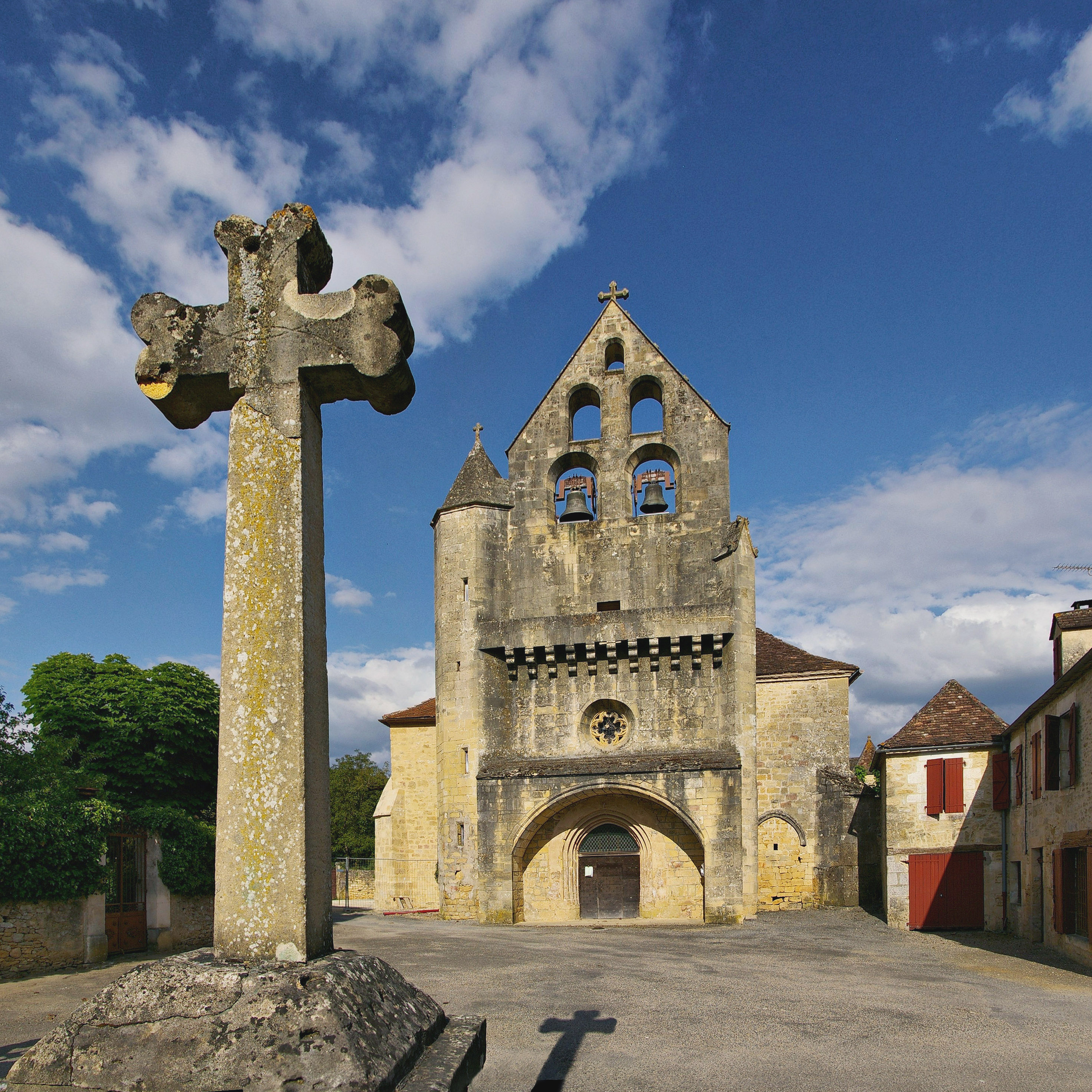
- The church and cross in Lamothe-Fénelon
- Location of Lamothe-Fénelon
- Location within France Location within Occitanie
- Coordinates: 44°50′08″N 1°24′54″E
- Country: France
- Region: Occitania
- Department: Lot
- Arrondissement: Gourdon
- Canton: Souillac
- Intercommunality: Causses et Vallée de la Dordogne

Government
  - Mayor (2020–2026): Patrick Charbonneau
- Area^{1}: 13.99 km^{2} (5.40 sq mi)
- Elevation: 128 m (420 ft)
- Highest elevation: 262 m (860 ft)
- Lowest elevation: 109 m (358 ft)
- Population (2023): 330
  - Density: 24/km^{2} (61/sq mi)
- Time zone: UTC+01:00 (CET)
  - Summer (DST): UTC+02:00 (CEST)
- INSEE/Postal code: 46152 /46350
- ^{1} French Land Register data, which excludes lakes, ponds, glaciers > 1 km^{2} (0.386 sq mi or 247 acres) and river estuaries.

Lamothe-Fénelon (French pronunciation: [lamɔt fenlɔ̃]; Occitan: La Mota de Fenelon) is a commune in the Lot department in south-western France.

== History ==
The Saint Sixte church in Lamothe-Fénelon has been classified as a historic monument since 1913. During the Ancien Régime, it was called Saint-Sixte de la Mothe Massaut in reference to the Knights of Massaut and Salignac. The church was partly destroyed during the Hundred Years War when the English captured the village in 1367. It has since been rebuilt and retains part of the old Romanesque church.

== See also ==
- Communes of the Lot department
