= Saint-Sozy =

- Commune
- Location of Saint-Sozy
- Location within France Location within Occitanie
- Coordinates: 44°52′52″N 1°33′54″E
- Country: France
- Region: Occitania
- Department: Lot
- Arrondissement: Gourdon
- Canton: Souillac

Government
  - Mayor (2020–2026): Jean-Philippe Gavet
- Area^{1}: 85.9 km^{2} (33.2 sq mi)
- Elevation: 104 m (341 ft)
- Population (2023): 490
  - Density: 5.7/km^{2} (15/sq mi)
- Time zone: UTC+01:00 (CET)
  - Summer (DST): UTC+02:00 (CEST)
- INSEE/Postal code: 46293 /46200
- ^{1} French Land Register data, which excludes lakes, ponds, glaciers > 1 km^{2} (0.386 sq mi or 247 acres) and river estuaries.

Saint-Sozy (French pronunciation: [sɛ̃ sozi]; Occitan: Sent Sòsi) is a commune in the Lot department in south-western France.

The town is known for its production of foie gras (Clos Saint Sozy), nuts, and tobacco.

Its stadium is named after René Lespinasse, former manager of the local football club "Les Coucous de Saint-Sozy".

== See also ==
- Communes of the Lot department
