= Reilhaguet =

- Commune
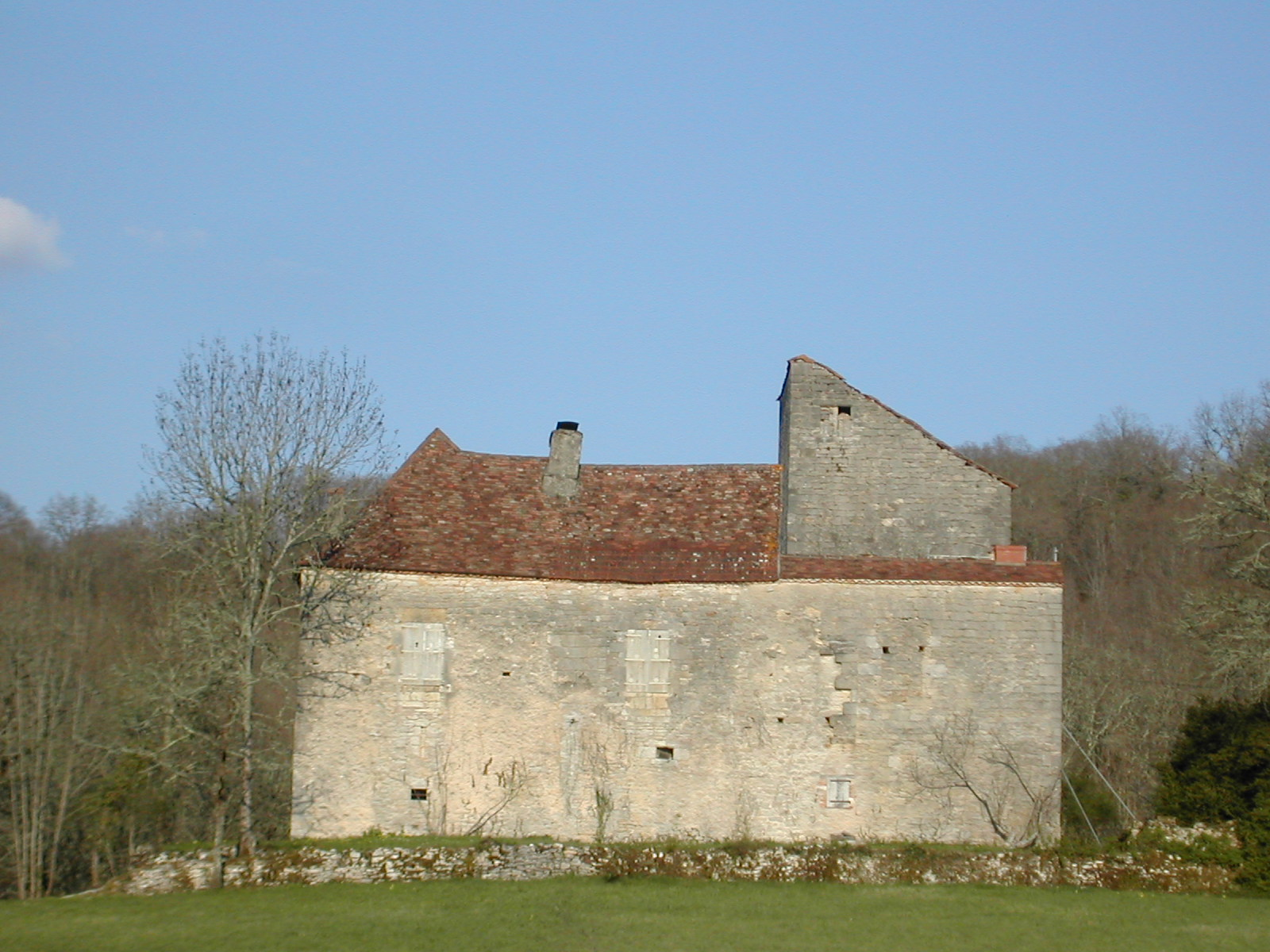
- The château de Laval
- Location of Reilhaguet
- Location within France Location within Occitanie
- Coordinates: 44°46′16″N 1°30′18″E
- Country: France
- Region: Occitania
- Department: Lot
- Arrondissement: Gourdon
- Canton: Souillac
- Intercommunality: Causses et Vallée de la Dordogne

Government
  - Mayor (2020–2026): Jean-Luc Bouyé
- Area^{1}: 15.96 km^{2} (6.16 sq mi)
- Elevation: 344 m (1,129 ft)
- Highest elevation: 390 m (1,280 ft)
- Lowest elevation: 131 m (430 ft)
- Population (2023): 156
  - Density: 9.77/km^{2} (25.3/sq mi)
- Time zone: UTC+01:00 (CET)
  - Summer (DST): UTC+02:00 (CEST)
- INSEE/Postal code: 46236 /46350
- ^{1} French Land Register data, which excludes lakes, ponds, glaciers > 1 km^{2} (0.386 sq mi or 247 acres) and river estuaries.

Reilhaguet (French pronunciation: [ʁɛjaɡɛ]; Occitan: Relhaguet) is a commune in the Lot department in south-western France.

== See also ==
- Communes of the Lot department
