= Loupiac, Lot =

Loupiac
- Commune
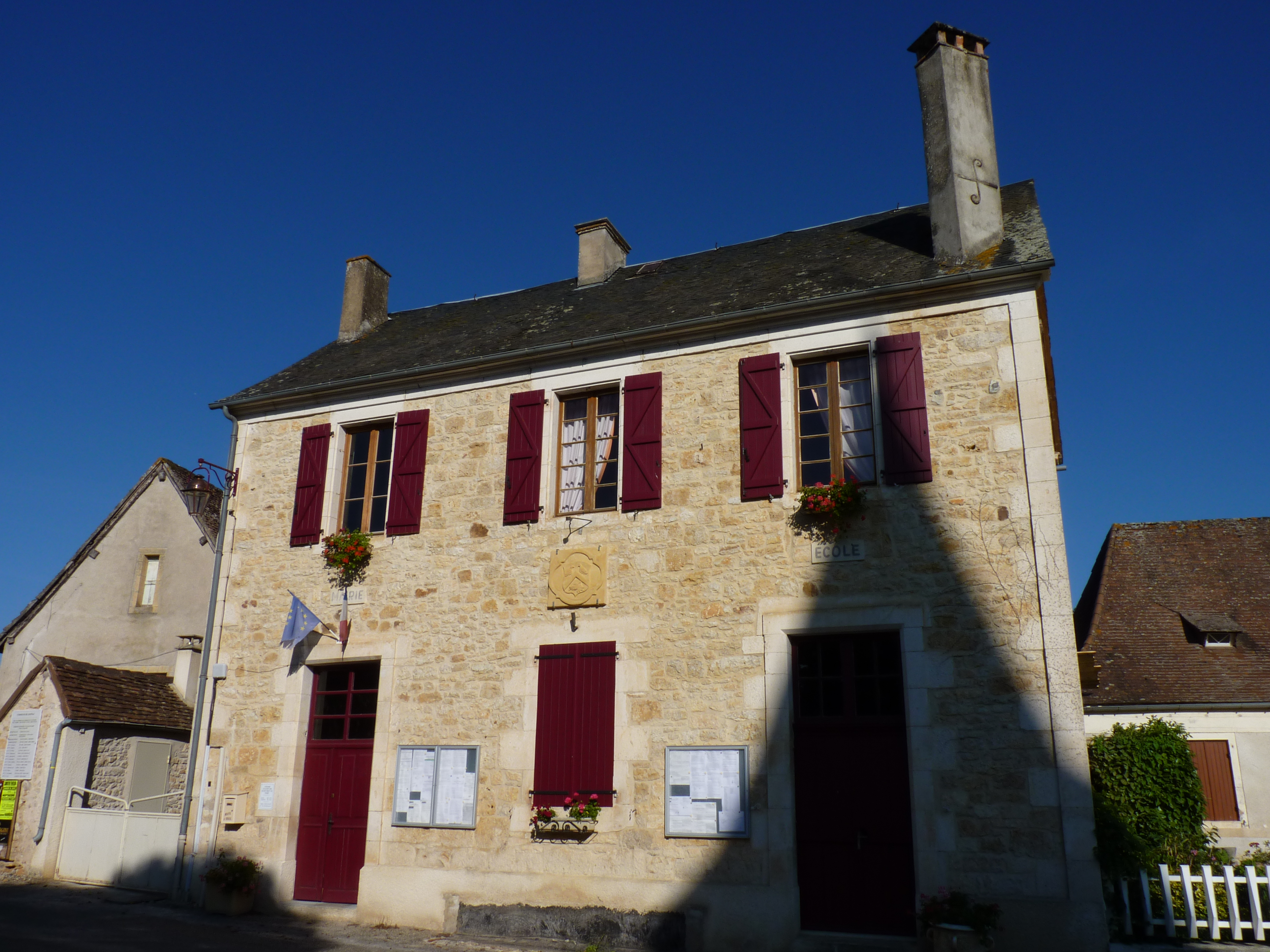
- The town hall in Loupiac

- Coat of arms
- Location of Loupiac
- Location within France Location within Occitanie
- Coordinates: 44°49′06″N 1°27′42″E
- Country: France
- Region: Occitania
- Department: Lot
- Arrondissement: Gourdon
- Canton: Souillac
- Intercommunality: Causses et Vallée de la Dordogne

Government
  - Mayor (2020–2026): Eric Lascombes
- Area^{1}: 12.65 km^{2} (4.88 sq mi)
- Elevation: 250 m (820 ft)
- Highest elevation: 294 m (965 ft)
- Lowest elevation: 99 m (325 ft)
- Population (2023): 280
  - Density: 22/km^{2} (57/sq mi)
- Time zone: UTC+01:00 (CET)
  - Summer (DST): UTC+02:00 (CEST)
- INSEE/Postal code: 46178 /46350
- ^{1} French Land Register data, which excludes lakes, ponds, glaciers > 1 km^{2} (0.386 sq mi or 247 acres) and river estuaries.

Loupiac (French pronunciation: [lupjak]; Occitan: Lopiac) is a commune in the Lot department in south-western France.

== See also ==
- Communes of the Lot department
