= Arrondissement of Gourdon =

Coordinates: 44.73°N 1.38°E

Gourdon
- Arrondissement
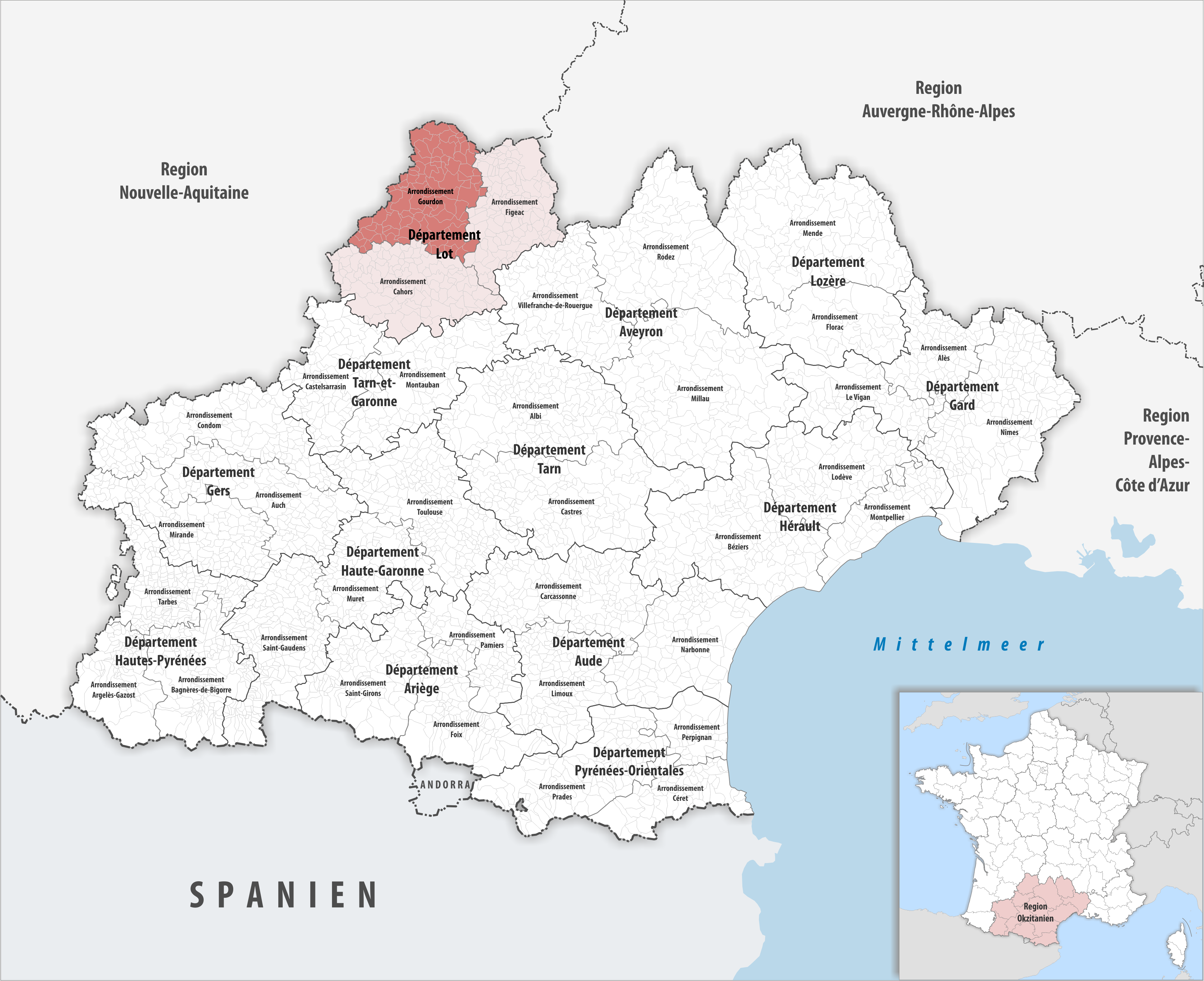
- Location within the region Occitanie
- Country: France
- Region: Occitania
- Department: Lot
- No. of communes: {{{nbcomm}}}
- Area: 1,762.3 km^{2} (680.4 sq mi)
- Population (2023): 47,182
  - Density: 26.773/km^{2} (69.342/sq mi)
- INSEE code: 463

The arrondissement of Gourdon is an arrondissement of France in the Lot department in the Occitanie region. It has 97 communes. Its population is 46,485 (2021), and its area is 1,762.3 km^{2} (680.4 sq mi).

== Composition ==
The communes of the arrondissement of Gourdon, and their INSEE codes, are:

1. Alvignac (46003)
2. Anglars-Nozac (46006)
3. Les Arques (46008)
4. Baladou (46016)
5. Le Bastit (46018)
6. Bétaille (46028)
7. Bio (46030)
8. Blars (46031)
9. Calès (46047)
10. Caniac-du-Causse (46054)
11. Carennac (46058)
12. Carlucet (46059)
13. Cavagnac (46065)
14. Cazals (46066)
15. Cœur-de-Causse (46138)
16. Concorès (46072)
17. Condat (46074)
18. Couzou (46078)
19. Cras (46079)
20. Cressensac-Sarrazac (46083)
21. Creysse (46084)
22. Cuzance (46086)
23. Dégagnac (46087)
24. Fajoles (46098)
25. Floirac (46106)
26. Frayssinet (46113)
27. Frayssinet-le-Gélat (46114)
28. Gignac (46118)
29. Gindou (46120)
30. Ginouillac (46121)
31. Goujounac (46126)
32. Gourdon (46127)
33. Gramat (46128)
34. Lacave (46144)
35. Lachapelle-Auzac (46145)
36. Lamothe-Cassel (46151)
37. Lamothe-Fénelon (46152)
38. Lanzac (46153)
39. Lauzès (46162)
40. Lavercantière (46164)
41. Lavergne (46165)
42. Lentillac-du-Causse (46167)
43. Léobard (46169)
44. Loupiac (46178)
45. Lunegarde (46181)
46. Marminiac (46184)
47. Martel (46185)
48. Masclat (46186)
49. Mayrac (46337)
50. Meyronne (46192)
51. Miers (46193)
52. Milhac (46194)
53. Montamel (46196)
54. Montcléra (46200)
55. Montfaucon (46204)
56. Montvalent (46208)
57. Nadaillac-de-Rouge (46209)
58. Nadillac (46210)
59. Orniac (46212)
60. Padirac (46213)
61. Payrac (46215)
62. Payrignac (46216)
63. Les Pechs-du-Vers (46252)
64. Peyrilles (46219)
65. Pinsac (46220)
66. Pomarède (46222)
67. Rampoux (46234)
68. Reilhaguet (46236)
69. Rignac (46238)
70. Le Roc (46239)
71. Rocamadour (46240)
72. Rouffilhac (46241)
73. Sabadel-Lauzès (46245)
74. Saint-Caprais (46250)
75. Saint-Chamarand (46253)
76. Saint-Cirq-Madelon (46257)
77. Saint-Cirq-Souillaguet (46258)
78. Saint-Clair (46259)
79. Saint-Denis-lès-Martel (46265)
80. Saint-Germain-du-Bel-Air (46267)
81. Saint-Michel-de-Bannières (46283)
82. Saint-Projet (46290)
83. Saint-Sozy (46293)
84. Salviac (46297)
85. Sénaillac-Lauzès (46303)
86. Séniergues (46304)
87. Soucirac (46308)
88. Souillac (46309)
89. Soulomès (46310)
90. Strenquels (46312)
91. Thédirac (46316)
92. Thégra (46317)
93. Ussel (46323)
94. Uzech (46324)
95. Vayrac (46330)
96. Le Vigan-en-Quercy (46334)
97. Le Vignon-en-Quercy (46232)

== History ==
The arrondissement of Gourdon was created in 1800. At the January 2017 reorganisation of the arrondissements of Lot, it gained 18 communes from the arrondissement of Cahors.

As a result of the reorganisation of the cantons of France which came into effect in 2015, the borders of the cantons are no longer related to the borders of the arrondissements. The cantons of the arrondissement of Gourdon were, as of January 2015:

1. Gourdon
2. Gramat
3. Labastide-Murat
4. Martel
5. Payrac
6. Saint-Germain-du-Bel-Air
7. Salviac
8. Souillac
9. Vayrac
