= Albiac =

Albiac is the name of the following communes in France:

- Albiac, Haute-Garonne, in the Haute-Garonne department
- Albiac, Lot, in the Lot department
