= Cougnac Caves =

Cave in the Lot departement, France

Coordinates: 44.7571°N 1.3759°E

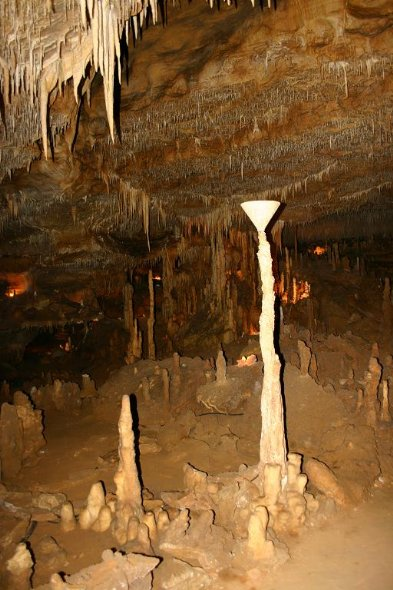
The first cave

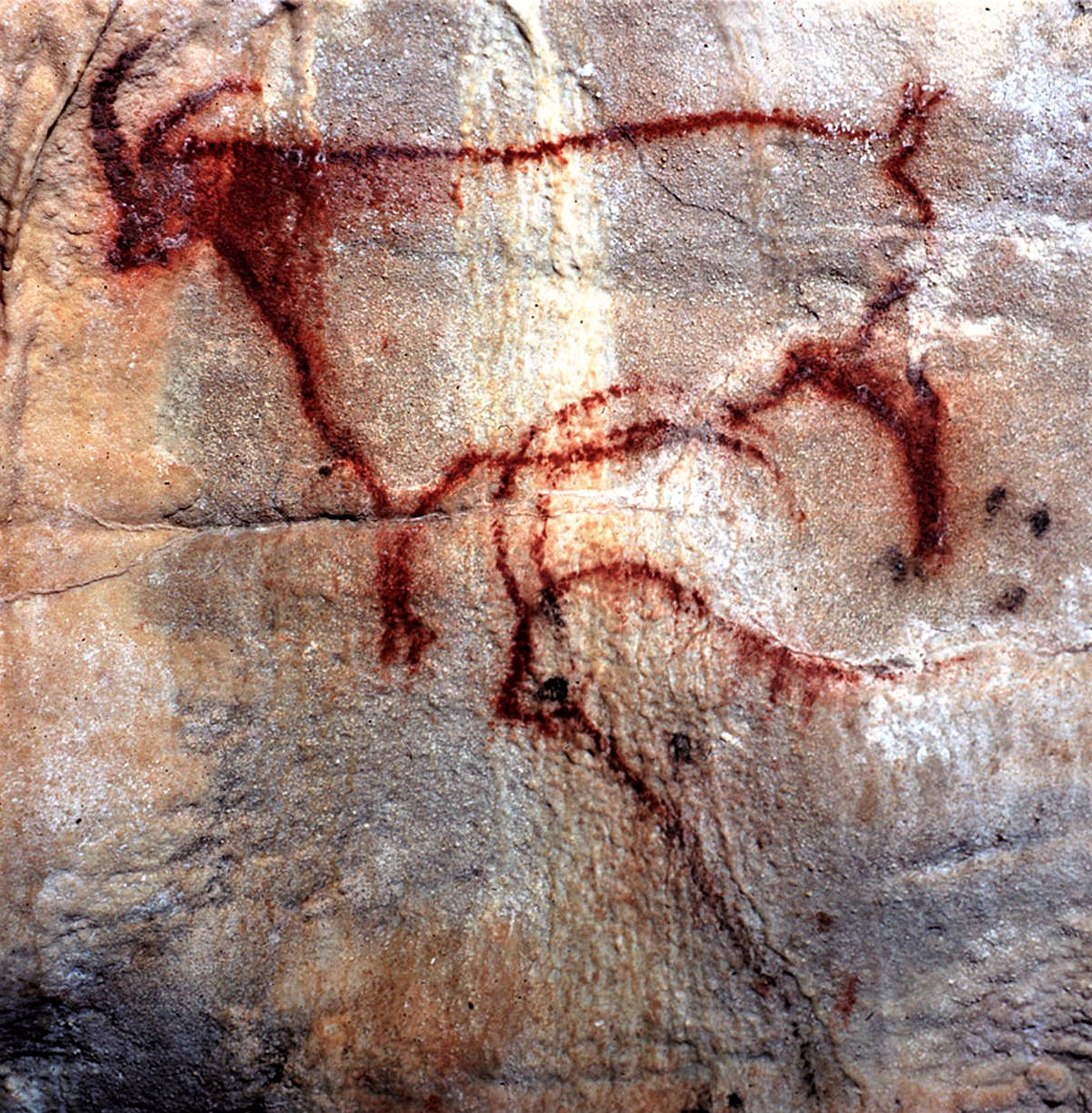
A painting in the second cave

The Cougnac Caves (French: Grottes de Cougnac) are located in the French commune of Payrignac near Gourdon, Lot department, in the Occitania. They are known for Paleolithic prehistoric art (rock engravings; paintings). In 1954 they were declared monument historique. The two caves were discovered in 1949 and 1952, respectively.

== In culture ==
They were the scene of the school trip in Le Boucher a.k.a. The Butcher and the final scene from Quelques messieurs trop tranquilles.
