= Rignac =

Rignac may refer to the following places in France:

- Rignac, Aveyron, a commune in the Aveyron department
- Rignac, Lot, a commune in the Lot department
