= Saint-Projet =

Saint-Projet (Saint Praejectus) may refer to the following places in France:

- Saint-Projet, Lot, a commune in the Lot department
- Saint-Projet, Tarn-et-Garonne, a commune in the Tarn-et-Garonne department
