= Marmoutier Abbey, Alsace =

French monastery

Coordinates: 48°41′26″N 7°22′57″E

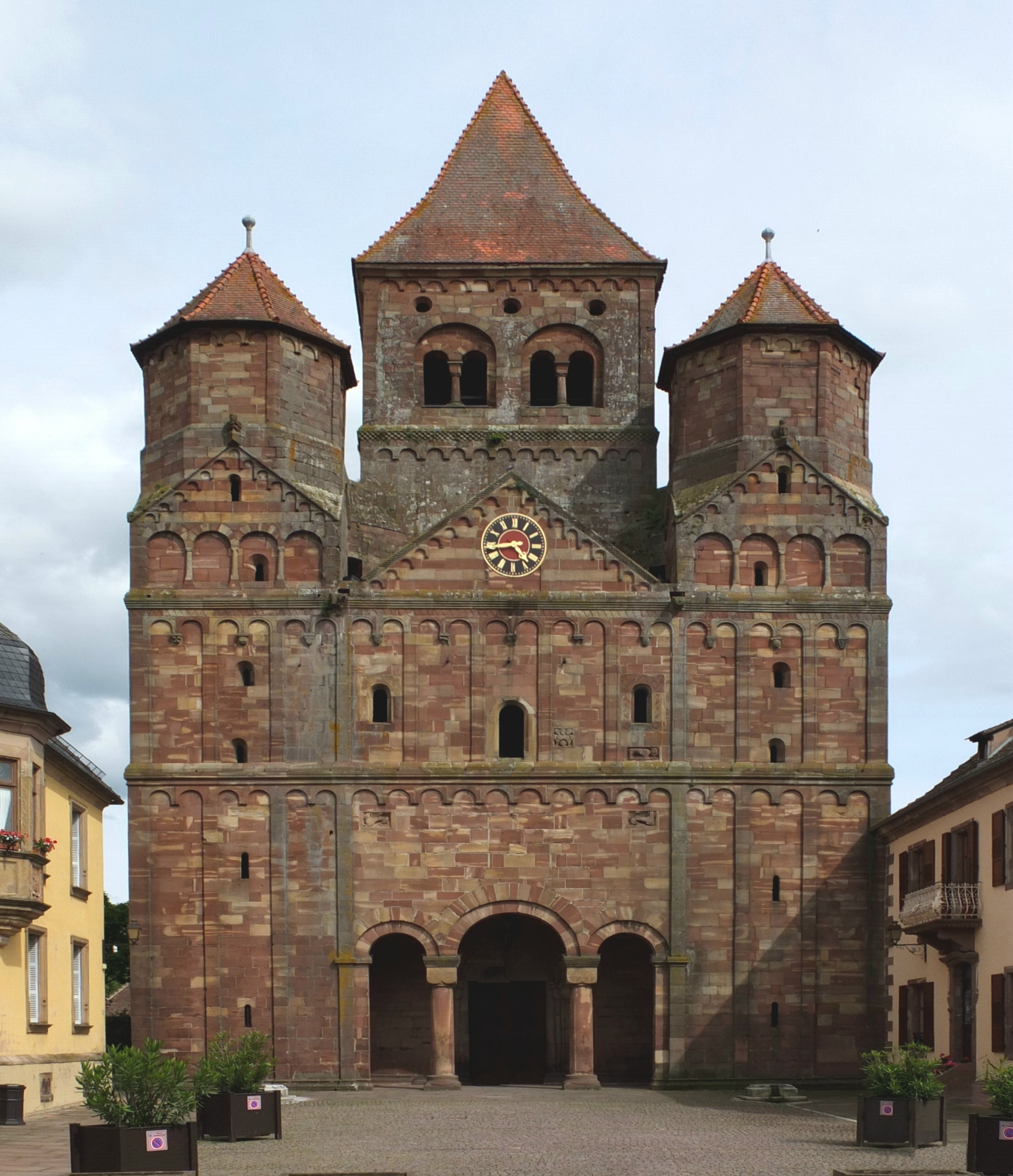
- West facade of the former abbey church in the main street of Marmoutier
- Interactive map of Marmoutier Abbey, Alsace

Monastery information
- Order: Benedictine
- Established: 590

People
- Founder: Saint Leobard

Site
- Location: Marmoutier, France

Marmoutier Abbey, otherwise Maursmünster Abbey, was a Benedictine monastery in the commune of Marmoutier in Alsace. The former abbey church now serves as the village's parish church.

== History ==
The first foundation by Saint Leobard around 590, was a community of Irish monks under the Rule of St. Columbanus. Then known as Aquileia, after the town in Italy, it was one of the Merovingian abbeys and a Reichsabtei.

About 724 Saint Pirmin reformed the Columban monasteries in Alsace, including this one, introducing the Rule of St. Benedict. The first abbot under the new rule was Maurus, from whom the place took the name of Maursmünster in German, of which Marmoutier is the French version.

Marmoutier abbey was rebuilt in the ninth century by Drogo of Metz. Under Abbot Meinhard and his successors in the 12th century, the abbey enjoyed a long period of growth and prosperity, including the consolidation of the large territory. In the 12th century the abbey church of St. Stephen's was built, which still stands today as an imposing Romanesque church. The west end, with its three massive towers, is especially striking.

In the 13th and 14th centuries the abbey began to decline, becoming involved in long wrangles over its properties, mostly with the family of Geroldseck, lords of the town of Maursmünster, now Marmoutier, that had grown up round the abbey. The abbey was also badly damaged during the German Peasants' War in 1525, when a mob ransacked the building and destroyed the library, and again in the Thirty Years' War, when it was plundered by Ernst von Mansfeld's soldiers in 1621. Under the Peace of Westphalia at the end of the war (1648), Alsace was transferred to France.

The latter part of the 17th century saw a revival of the abbey's fortunes, and in the 18th century, particularly under abbots Anselm Moser and Placid Schweighäuser, re-building was undertaken, including the quire of the church in the 1760s. However, the French Revolution saw the dissolution of the monastery and the demolition or sale of all its buildings.

The church survives as the parish church, and other monastic buildings now serve as the presbytery and the mairie. The church is located on the Route Romane d'Alsace. With a total length of 74 metres (243 feet), it is one of the most imposing Christian sanctuaries in that part of Alsace.

== Sources ==
- Will, R. (intro by H. Haug), 1966. Das romanische Elsass, pp. 143–211. Zodiaque (German edition).
- Goldinger, Walter, 1938. Die Verfassung des Klosters Maursmünster im Elsaß, in: Zeitschrift für die Geschichte des Oberrheins, 90, 1938.
