= Le Boucher =

1970 film by Claude Chabrol

- French film poster
- Directed by: Claude Chabrol
- Written by: Claude Chabrol
- Produced by: André Génovès
- Starring: Stéphane Audran; Jean Yanne
- Cinematography: Jean Rabier
- Edited by: Jacques Gaillard
- Music by: Pierre Jansen
- Production companies: Les Films La Boétie; Euro International Films
- Release dates: February 27, 1970 (France); September 8, 1970 (Italy)
- Running time: 93 minutes
- Countries: France; Italy
- Language: French

Le Boucher ('The Butcher') is a 1970 psychological thriller film written and directed by Claude Chabrol and starring Stéphane Audran and Jean Yanne. Set in the village of Trémolat, it tells the story of butcher Popaul who falls in love with Hélène, the head teacher of the school, while a murder spree is taking place in the area.

It was a French and Italian co-production between the Paris-based Les Films La Boétie and the Rome-based Euro International Films.

== Plot ==
Butcher Popaul and Hélène, the head teacher of the village school, become acquainted at the assistant teacher's wedding. He tells her that he had served in the army for 15 years as a means of getting away from his father, of whom he speaks disdainfully. During the next few weeks, the two repeatedly meet and spend time together, but always on a strictly platonic level. While gathering mushrooms together, Popaul asks Hélène why she is not in a relationship, to which she explains an unhappy love affair years ago that took her months to recover from. In return, Popaul tells her about the awful things he witnessed in Indochina and the Algerian war.

Soon after the news of the murder of a young woman reaches the town, a second victim, the assistant teacher's wife, is discovered by Hélène and her pupils during a school excursion. At the murder site, Hélène finds a conspicuous cigarette lighter that she had given to Popaul as a present. Instead of informing the police, she hides it in a drawer in her home. When she meets Popaul the next time, he lights her cigarette with a lighter that looks exactly like the one she had given him. Relieved, Hélène believes that the lighter she found was not his.

Hélène agrees to Popaul's offer to repaint her room, which he does while she is out. While looking for a cloth to clean up with, he discovers the hidden lighter and pockets it. When Hélène finds the lighter gone after he has left, she realises that he knows she can identify him as the murderer. Seeing Popaul from her window, she locks the doors, but he has already entered the house. Popaul, cornering her at knife point, tells her that he had bought an identical lighter after losing the first one and explains what drives him to commit the murders. Convinced that he will stab her, Hélène closes her eyes, but Popaul thrusts the knife into his own abdomen instead.

While she drives him to the hospital, Popaul tells the crying Hélène about all the blood he has seen and confesses that he loved her and only wished to be with her. Upon their arrival, he asks her to kiss him, which she does. Shortly after, he dies. The last images show Hélène standing on the riverbank with blank eyes.

== Cast ==
- Stéphane Audran as Hélène Daville
- Jean Yanne as Paul Thomas, known as Popaul
- Roger Rudel as Inspector Grumbach

== Production ==
Chabrol had initially planned to shoot the film in the commune of Les Eyzies, but finally decided to shoot in Trémolat, as he wanted a village with prehistoric caves in the vicinity but found Les Eyzies too touristic. The sites where shooting took place were mostly left unchanged, including the local butcher shop which served as the shop of Popaul. Filming also took place at the Cougnac Caves in Payrignac (Lot).

== Release ==
Le Boucher was released in France on 27 February 1970, In France, it had almost 1,150,000 spectators which the authors of French Thrillers of the 1970s: Volume I, Crime Films described as being a "good commercial success. It was released in Italy on September 8, 1970 as Il tagliagole.

On 12 September 1970, it was screened at the New York Film Festival.

Paris-based Tamasa Distribution is set to release "Première Vague" a collection of Blu-ray discs of seven early films by Chabrol. The box set is set for release in France on November 18, 2025. Variety reported that it would include films that were "long unavailable" to the public, including The Butcher.

== Reception ==
After its presentation at the New York Film Festival, Vincent Canby of The New York Times wrote a thoroughly sympathetic review of Le Boucher, comparing the film's "romantic realism" with Alfred Hitchcock's Spellbound and Fritz Lang's Scarlet Street and titling it "the most elegant, most sorrowful of Chabrol's recent films", excelled only by his The Unfaithful Wife. In the January–February 1972 edition of the Los Angeles Free Press, critic Dick Lochte called Le Boucher the best of the director's films so far, "a wonderfully controlled psychological thriller" and "a compact, hard, bright jewel of a movie", praising, like Canby, actors Audran and Yanne.

== Awards ==
- 1970: Silver Shell for Best Actress at the 18th San Sebastián International Film Festival for Stéphane Audran
- 1971: Bodil Award for Best Non-American Film for Claude Chabrol
