= Le Vigan-en-Quercy =

- Commune
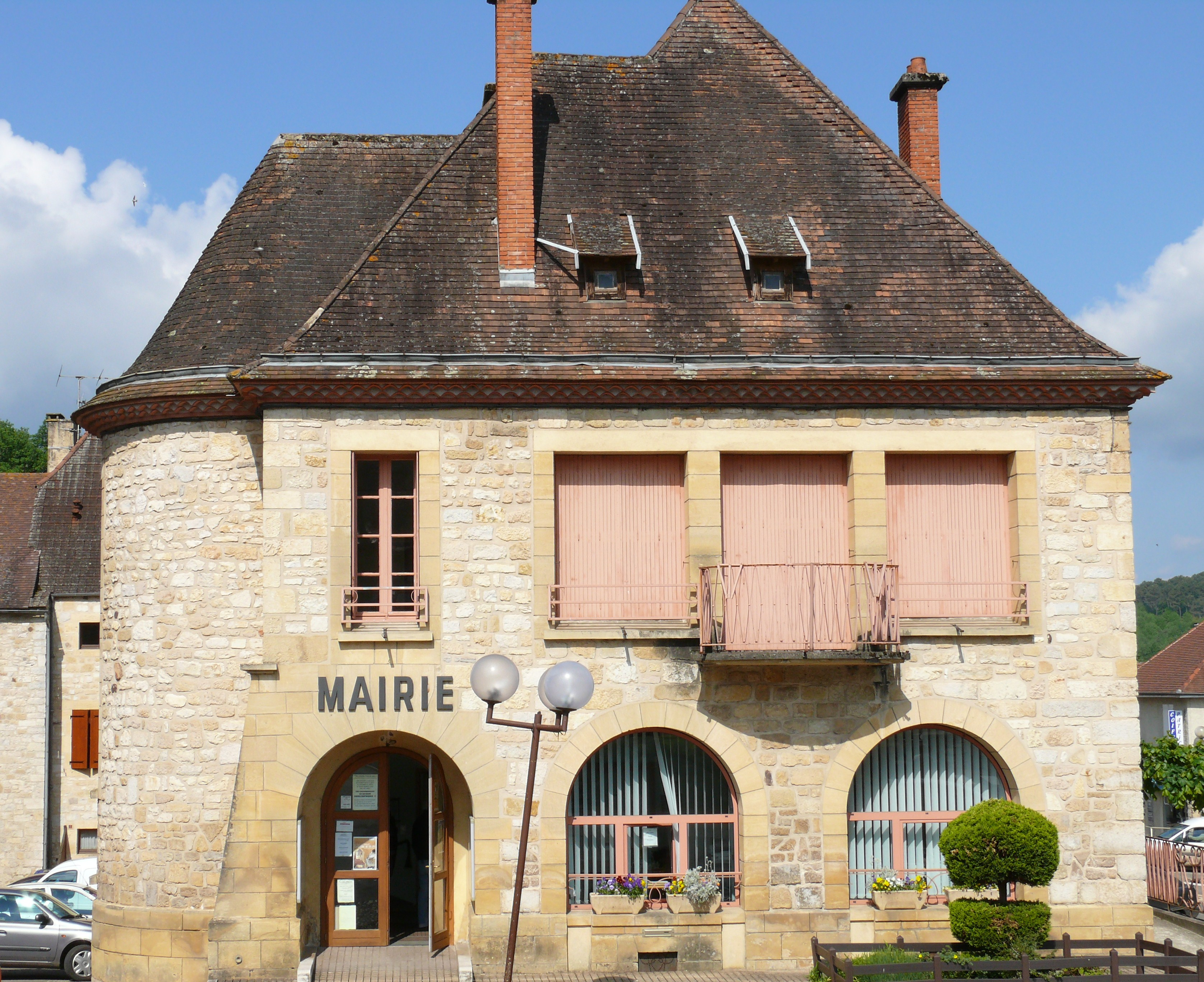
- The town hall in Le Vigan
- Location of Le Vigan-en-Quercy
- Location within France Location within Occitanie
- Coordinates: 44°44′33″N 1°26′23″E
- Country: France
- Region: Occitania
- Department: Lot
- Arrondissement: Gourdon
- Canton: Gourdon
- Intercommunality: Quercy-Bouriane

Government
  - Mayor (2020–2026): Jean-Michel Favory
- Area^{1}: 34.4 km^{2} (13.3 sq mi)
- Elevation: 333 m (1,093 ft)
- Highest elevation: 391 m (1,283 ft)
- Lowest elevation: 202 m (663 ft)
- Population (2023): 1,535
  - Density: 44.6/km^{2} (116/sq mi)
- Time zone: UTC+01:00 (CET)
  - Summer (DST): UTC+02:00 (CEST)
- INSEE/Postal code: 46334 /46300
- ^{1} French Land Register data, which excludes lakes, ponds, glaciers > 1 km^{2} (0.386 sq mi or 247 acres) and river estuaries.

Le Vigan-en-Quercy (French pronunciation: [lə viɡɑ̃]; Occitan: Lo Vigan, before 2025: Le Vigan) is a commune in the Lot department in south-western France. It is also in Bouriane a sandy Natural region of hills covered in forests dominated by chestnut trees.

The town has grown in population since 1962 with 1,546 inhabitants as of 2020. These people are known as Vigannais or Vigannaises.

== See also ==
- Communes of the Lot department
