= Miers, Lot =

Miers
- Commune
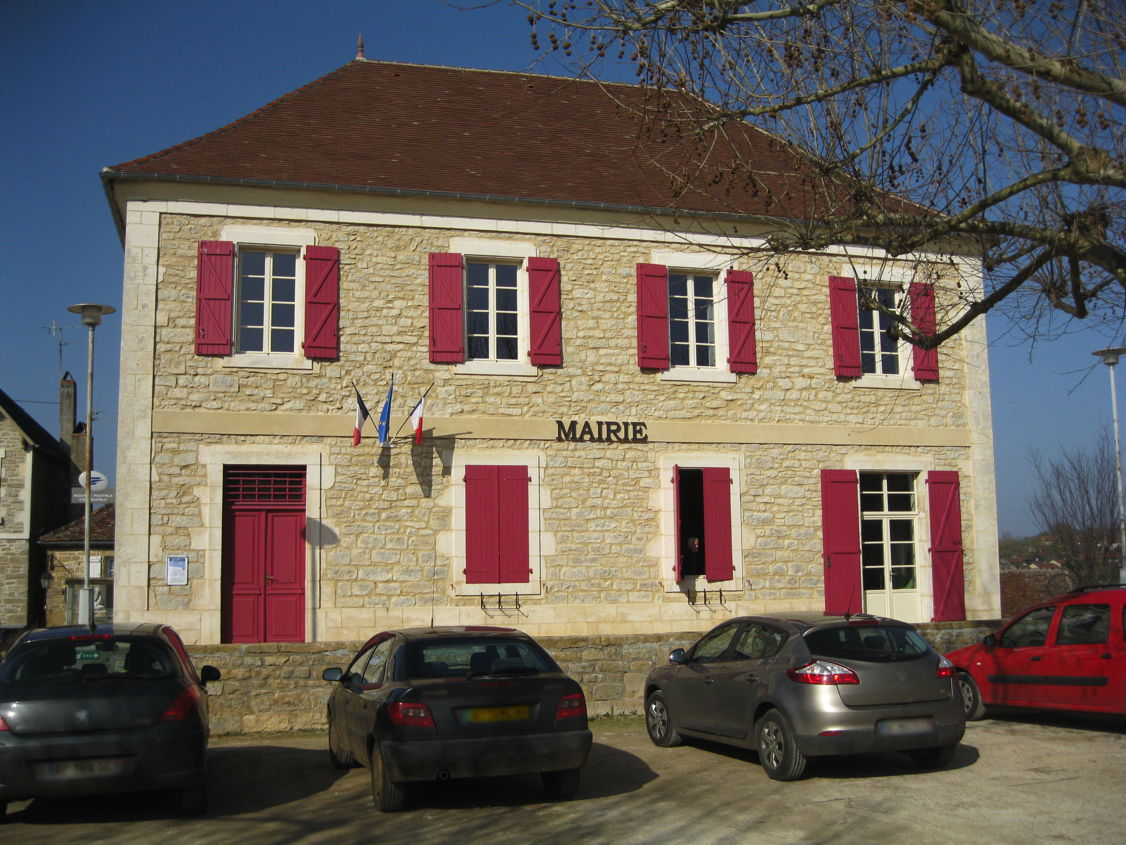
- The town hall in Miers
- Location of Miers
- Location within France Location within Occitanie
- Coordinates: 44°51′16″N 1°42′29″E
- Country: France
- Region: Occitania
- Department: Lot
- Arrondissement: Gourdon
- Canton: Gramat
- Intercommunality: Causses et Vallée de la Dordogne

Government
  - Mayor (2020–2026): Caroline Mey
- Area^{1}: 25.28 km^{2} (9.76 sq mi)
- Elevation: 385 m (1,263 ft)
- Highest elevation: 430 m (1,410 ft)
- Lowest elevation: 218 m (715 ft)
- Population (2023): 445
  - Density: 17.6/km^{2} (45.6/sq mi)
- Time zone: UTC+01:00 (CET)
  - Summer (DST): UTC+02:00 (CEST)
- INSEE/Postal code: 46193 /46500
- ^{1} French Land Register data, which excludes lakes, ponds, glaciers > 1 km^{2} (0.386 sq mi or 247 acres) and river estuaries.

Miers (Occitan: Mèrs) is a commune in the Lot department in south-western France.

== See also ==
- Communes of the Lot department
