= Lavercantière =

- Commune
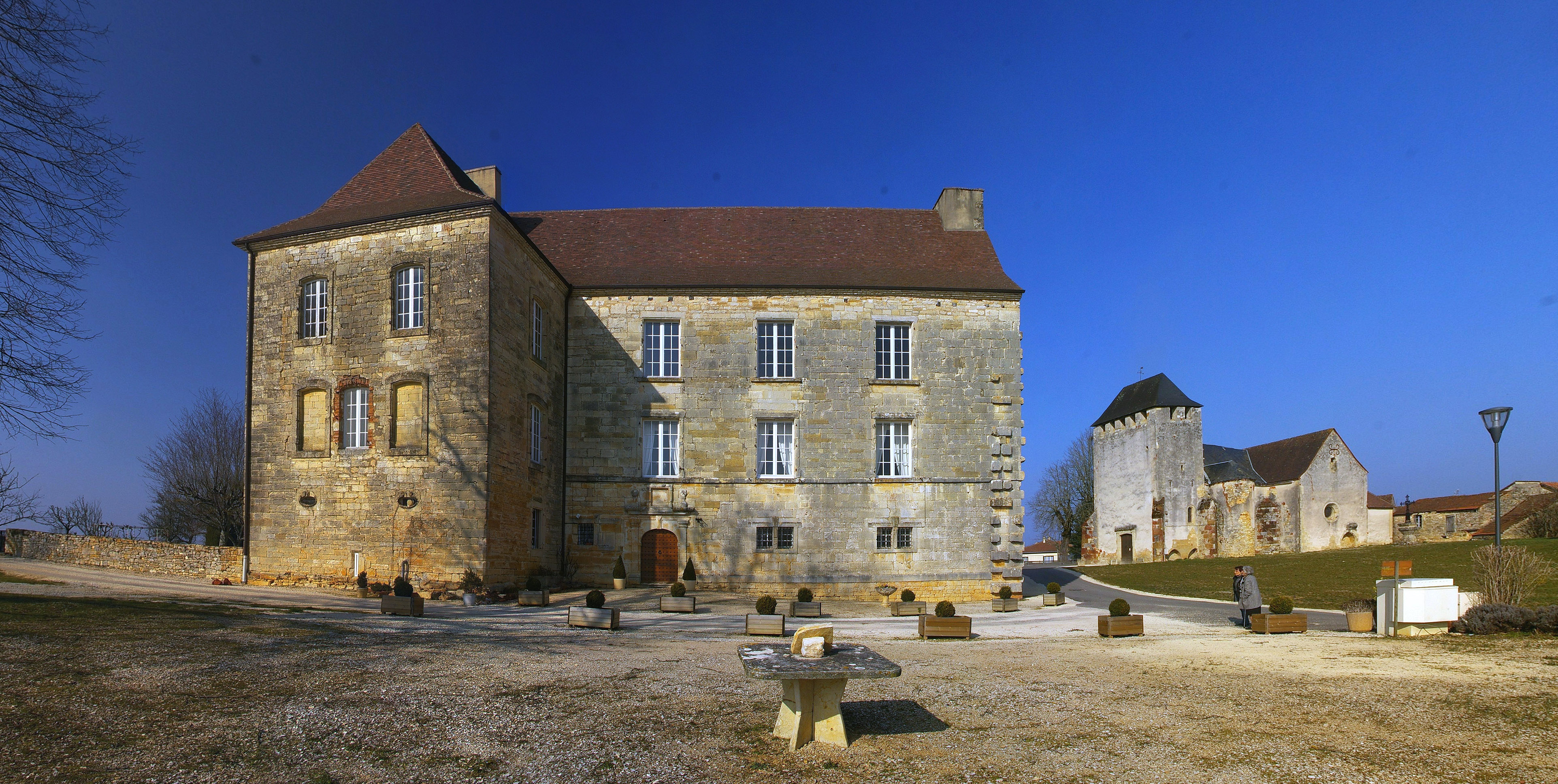
- The chateau and church in Lavercantière
- Location of Lavercantière
- Location within France Location within Occitanie
- Coordinates: 44°38′18″N 1°19′11″E
- Country: France
- Region: Occitania
- Department: Lot
- Arrondissement: Gourdon
- Canton: Gourdon
- Intercommunality: Cazals-Salviac

Government
  - Mayor (2025–2026): Gérard Besombes
- Area^{1}: 14.99 km^{2} (5.79 sq mi)
- Elevation: 362 m (1,188 ft)
- Highest elevation: 355 m (1,165 ft)
- Lowest elevation: 192 m (630 ft)
- Population (2023): 234
  - Density: 15.6/km^{2} (40.4/sq mi)
- Time zone: UTC+01:00 (CET)
  - Summer (DST): UTC+02:00 (CEST)
- INSEE/Postal code: 46164 /46340
- ^{1} French Land Register data, which excludes lakes, ponds, glaciers > 1 km^{2} (0.386 sq mi or 247 acres) and river estuaries.

Lavercantière (French pronunciation: [lavɛʁkɑ̃tjɛʁ]; Occitan: La Vercantièra) is a commune in the Lot department in south-western France.

== See also ==
- Communes of the Lot department
