= Dégagnac =

- Commune
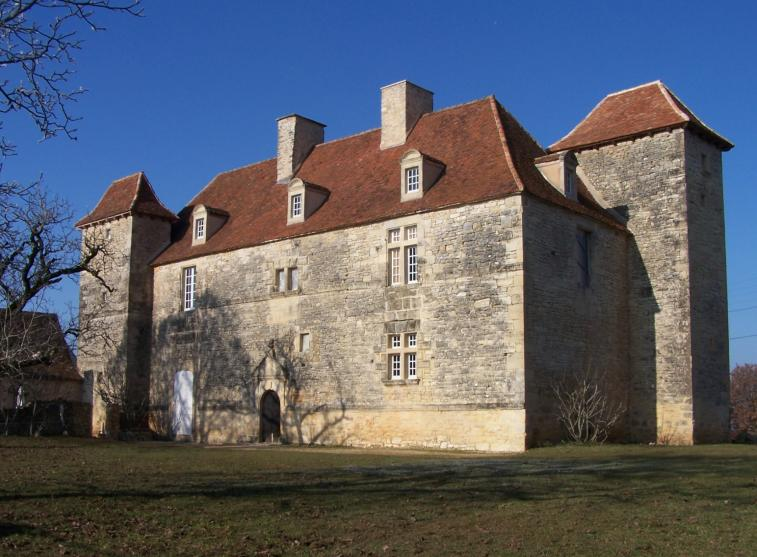
- The Château de Lantis, in Dégagnac
- Location of Dégagnac
- Location within France Location within Occitanie
- Coordinates: 44°39′57″N 1°19′00″E
- Country: France
- Region: Occitania
- Department: Lot
- Arrondissement: Gourdon
- Canton: Gourdon
- Intercommunality: Cazals-Salviac

Government
  - Mayor (2020–2026): Didier Pugnet
- Area^{1}: 37.9 km^{2} (14.6 sq mi)
- Elevation: 185 m (607 ft)
- Highest elevation: 306 m (1,004 ft)
- Lowest elevation: 140 m (460 ft)
- Population (2023): 642
  - Density: 16.9/km^{2} (43.9/sq mi)
- Time zone: UTC+01:00 (CET)
  - Summer (DST): UTC+02:00 (CEST)
- INSEE/Postal code: 46087 /46340
- ^{1} French Land Register data, which excludes lakes, ponds, glaciers > 1 km^{2} (0.386 sq mi or 247 acres) and river estuaries.

Dégagnac (French pronunciation: [deɡaɲak]; Occitan: Deganhac) is a commune in the Lot department in south-western France.

== Geography ==
The river Céou forms all of the commune's north-eastern border.

== See also ==
- Communes of the Lot department
