= Durbans =

- Commune
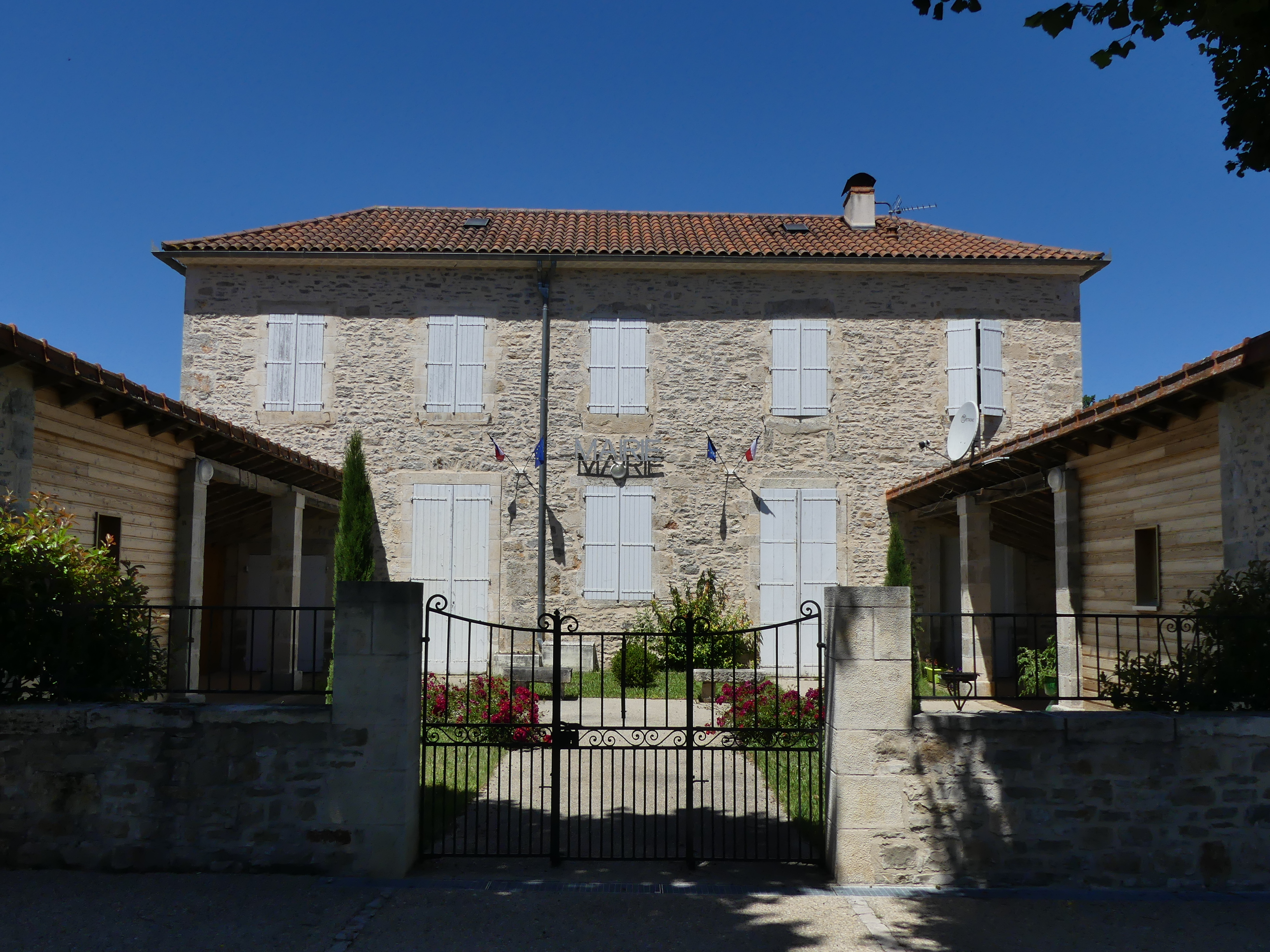
- Durbans Town hall
- Location of Durbans
- Location within France Location within Occitanie
- Coordinates: 44°40′39″N 1°46′30″E
- Country: France
- Region: Occitania
- Department: Lot
- Arrondissement: Figeac
- Canton: Gramat
- Intercommunality: Grand-Figeac

Government
  - Mayor (2020–2026): Henri Gratias
- Area^{1}: 27.81 km^{2} (10.74 sq mi)
- Elevation: 318 m (1,043 ft)
- Highest elevation: 393 m (1,289 ft)
- Lowest elevation: 287 m (942 ft)
- Population (2023): 158
  - Density: 5.68/km^{2} (14.7/sq mi)
- Time zone: UTC+01:00 (CET)
  - Summer (DST): UTC+02:00 (CEST)
- INSEE/Postal code: 46090 /46320
- ^{1} French Land Register data, which excludes lakes, ponds, glaciers > 1 km^{2} (0.386 sq mi or 247 acres) and river estuaries.

Durbans is a commune in the Lot department in south-western France.

== See also ==
- Communes of the Lot department
