= Saint-Clair, Lot =

Saint-Clair
- Commune
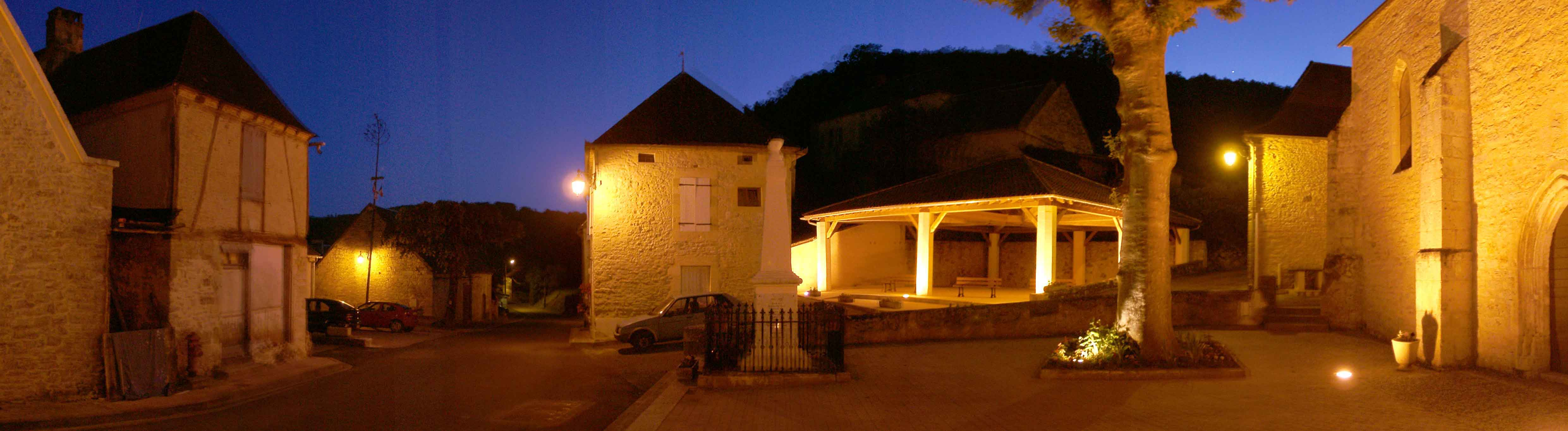
- A night view of the main square
- Location of Saint-Clair
- Location within France Location within Occitanie
- Coordinates: 44°42′02″N 1°24′43″E
- Country: France
- Region: Occitania
- Department: Lot
- Arrondissement: Gourdon
- Canton: Gourdon
- Intercommunality: Quercy-Bouriane

Government
  - Mayor (2026–32): Dominique Dulac
- Area^{1}: 11 km^{2} (4.2 sq mi)
- Elevation: 342 m (1,122 ft)
- Highest elevation: 365 m (1,198 ft)
- Lowest elevation: 167 m (548 ft)
- Population (2023): 143
  - Density: 13/km^{2} (34/sq mi)
- Time zone: UTC+01:00 (CET)
  - Summer (DST): UTC+02:00 (CEST)
- INSEE/Postal code: 46259 /46300
- ^{1} French Land Register data, which excludes lakes, ponds, glaciers > 1 km^{2} (0.386 sq mi or 247 acres) and river estuaries.

Saint-Clair (French pronunciation: [sɛ̃ klɛːʁ]; Occitan: Sent Clar) is a commune in the Lot department in south-western France.

== See also ==
- Communes of the Lot department
