= Gindou =

- Commune
- Location of Gindou
- Location within France Location within Occitanie
- Coordinates: 44°37′56″N 1°15′03″E
- Country: France
- Region: Occitania
- Department: Lot
- Arrondissement: Gourdon
- Canton: Gourdon
- Intercommunality: Cazals-Salviac

Government
  - Mayor (2020–2026): Mireille Figeac
- Area^{1}: 15.65 km^{2} (6.04 sq mi)
- Elevation: 295 m (968 ft)
- Highest elevation: 331 m (1,086 ft)
- Lowest elevation: 163 m (535 ft)
- Population (2023): 356
  - Density: 22.7/km^{2} (58.9/sq mi)
- Time zone: UTC+01:00 (CET)
  - Summer (DST): UTC+02:00 (CEST)
- INSEE/Postal code: 46120 /46250
- ^{1} French Land Register data, which excludes lakes, ponds, glaciers > 1 km^{2} (0.386 sq mi or 247 acres) and river estuaries.

Gindou (French pronunciation: [ʒɛ̃du]; Occitan: Gindon) is a commune in the Lot department in south-western France.

== See also ==
- Communes of the Lot department
