= Saint-Cirq-Souillaguet =

- Commune
- Location of Saint-Cirq-Souillaguet
- Location within France Location within Occitanie
- Coordinates: 44°42′31″N 1°27′33″E
- Country: France
- Region: Occitania
- Department: Lot
- Arrondissement: Gourdon
- Canton: Gourdon
- Intercommunality: Quercy-Bouriane

Government
  - Mayor (2020–2026): Michel Combes
- Area^{1}: 8.54 km^{2} (3.30 sq mi)
- Elevation: 260 m (850 ft)
- Highest elevation: 380 m (1,250 ft)
- Lowest elevation: 220 m (720 ft)
- Population (2023): 172
  - Density: 20.1/km^{2} (52.2/sq mi)
- Time zone: UTC+01:00 (CET)
  - Summer (DST): UTC+02:00 (CEST)
- INSEE/Postal code: 46258 /46300
- ^{1} French Land Register data, which excludes lakes, ponds, glaciers > 1 km^{2} (0.386 sq mi or 247 acres) and river estuaries.

Saint-Cirq-Souillaguet (French pronunciation: [sɛ̃ siʁk sujaɡɛ]; Occitan: Sent Circ e Solhaguet) is a commune in the Lot department in south-western France.

== See also ==
- Communes of the Lot department
