= Carlucet =

- Commune
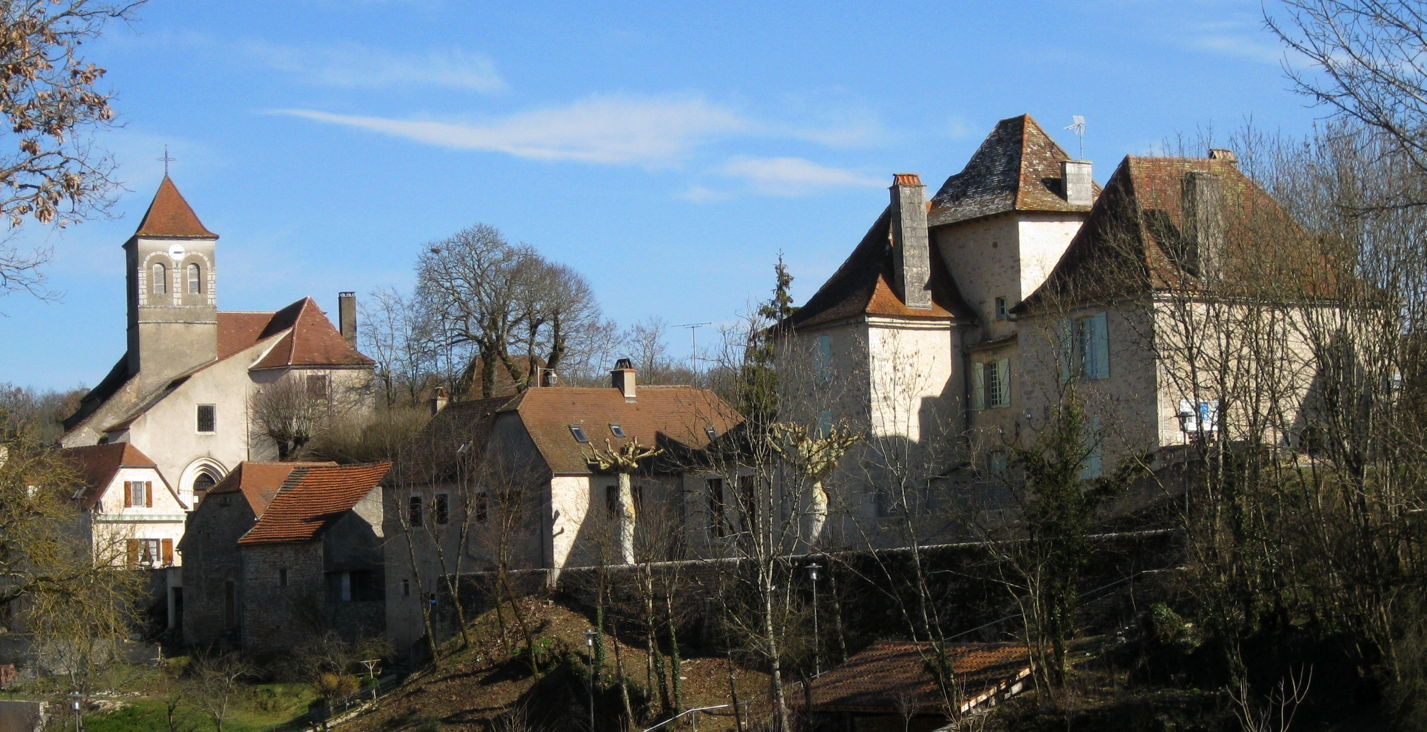
- The church and surrounding buildings in Carlucet
- Location of Carlucet
- Location within France Location within Occitanie
- Coordinates: 44°43′20″N 1°36′48″E
- Country: France
- Region: Occitania
- Department: Lot
- Arrondissement: Gourdon
- Canton: Gramat
- Intercommunality: Causses et Vallée de la Dordogne

Government
  - Mayor (2020–2026): Hervé Garnier
- Area^{1}: 33.7 km^{2} (13.0 sq mi)
- Elevation: 350 m (1,150 ft)
- Highest elevation: 385 m (1,263 ft)
- Lowest elevation: 171 m (561 ft)
- Population (2023): 230
  - Density: 6.8/km^{2} (18/sq mi)
- Time zone: UTC+01:00 (CET)
  - Summer (DST): UTC+02:00 (CEST)
- INSEE/Postal code: 46059 /46500
- ^{1} French Land Register data, which excludes lakes, ponds, glaciers > 1 km^{2} (0.386 sq mi or 247 acres) and river estuaries.

Carlucet (French pronunciation: [kaʁlysɛ]) is a commune in the Lot department in south-western France.

== See also ==
- Communes of the Lot department
