= Rouffilhac =

- Commune
- Location of Rouffilhac
- Location within France Location within Occitanie
- Coordinates: 44°47′24″N 1°24′59″E
- Country: France
- Region: Occitania
- Department: Lot
- Arrondissement: Gourdon
- Canton: Gourdon
- Intercommunality: Quercy-Bouriane

Government
  - Mayor (2020–2026): Jean-Michel Gabet
- Area^{1}: 6.5 km^{2} (2.5 sq mi)
- Elevation: 210 m (690 ft)
- Highest elevation: 265 m (869 ft)
- Lowest elevation: 128 m (420 ft)
- Population (2023): 203
  - Density: 31/km^{2} (81/sq mi)
- Time zone: UTC+01:00 (CET)
  - Summer (DST): UTC+02:00 (CEST)
- INSEE/Postal code: 46241 /46300
- ^{1} French Land Register data, which excludes lakes, ponds, glaciers > 1 km^{2} (0.386 sq mi or 247 acres) and river estuaries.

Rouffilhac (French pronunciation: [ʁufijak]; Occitan: Rofilhac) is a commune in the Lot department in south-western France.

== See also ==
- Communes of the Lot department
