= Alvignac =

- Commune
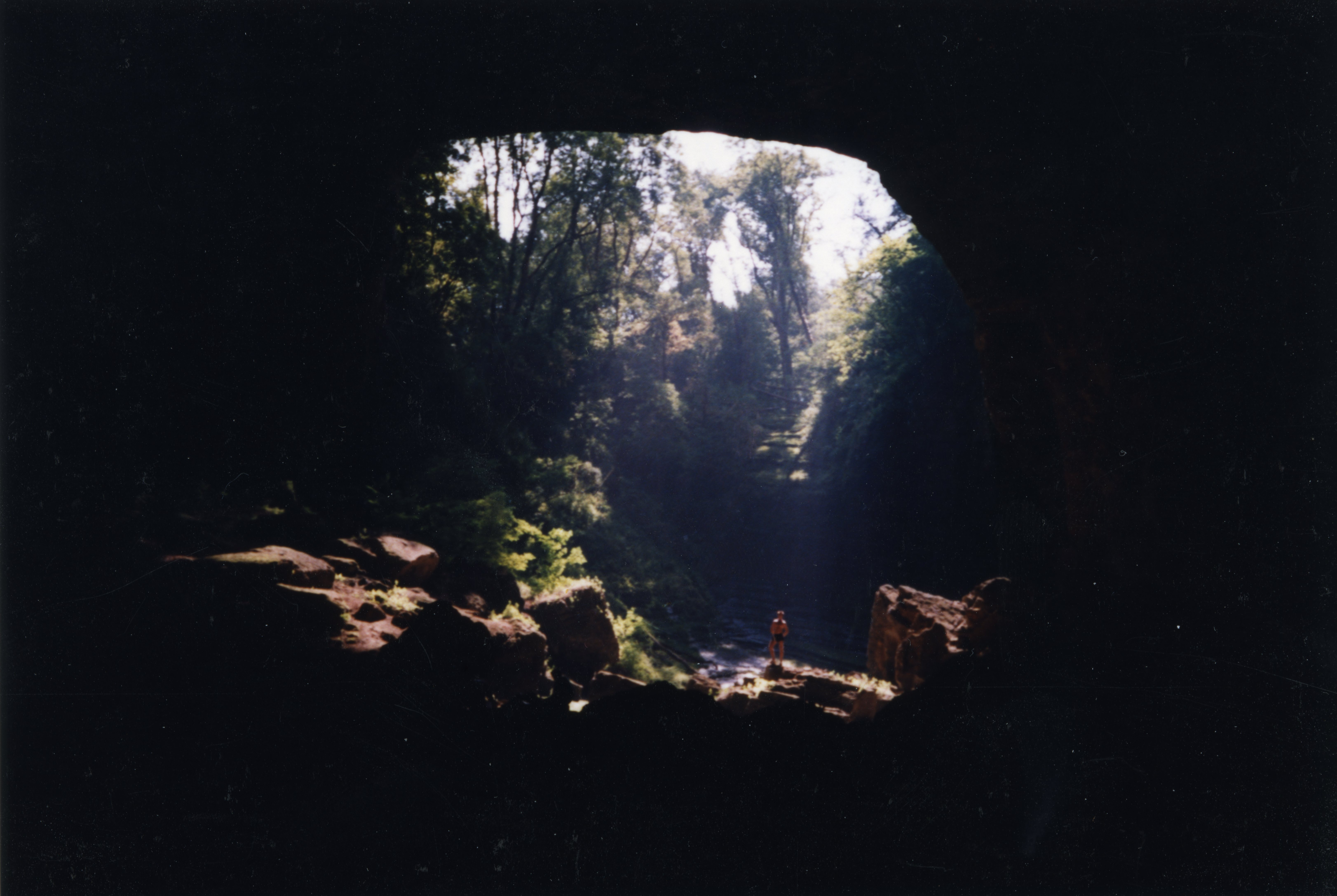
- Cave of Reveillon
- Location of Alvignac
- Location within France Location within Occitanie
- Coordinates: 44°49′40″N 1°41′37″E
- Country: France
- Region: Occitania
- Department: Lot
- Arrondissement: Gourdon
- Canton: Gramat

Government
  - Mayor (2020–2026): Alfred Terlizzi
- Area^{1}: 13.05 km^{2} (5.04 sq mi)
- Elevation: 860 m (2,820 ft)
- Highest elevation: 419 m (1,375 ft)
- Lowest elevation: 249 m (817 ft)
- Population (2023): 699
  - Density: 53.6/km^{2} (139/sq mi)
- Time zone: UTC+01:00 (CET)
  - Summer (DST): UTC+02:00 (CEST)
- INSEE/Postal code: 46003 /46500
- ^{1} French Land Register data, which excludes lakes, ponds, glaciers > 1 km^{2} (0.386 sq mi or 247 acres) and river estuaries.

Alvignac (French pronunciation: [alviɲak]; Occitan: Albinhac) is a commune in the Lot department in southwestern France.

== Population ==
Historical population
Year	Pop.	±% p.a.
1968	540	—
1975	525	−0.40%
1982	566	+1.08%
1990	473	−2.22%
1999	573	+2.15%
2007	650	+1.59%
2012	727	+2.26%
2017	720	−0.19%
2023	699	−0.49%
Source: INSEE

Inhabitants are called Alvignacois in French.

== See also ==
- Communes of the Lot department
- Cave of Reveillon
