= Yves Salgues =

French novelist

Yves Salgues (2 February 1924 – 4 April 1997) was a French journalist and writer.

== Life ==
Born in Cazals, in the Lot, in turn reporter for Paris Match, editor of Jours de France and literary columnist in Madame Figaro, he is the author of a collection of poems (Les Chants de Nathanaël. Salgues is a recipient of the Prix Guillaume Apollinaire (1943), and also wrote artist biographies (Charles Aznavour, Serge Gainsbourg, James Dean) and novels, including an erotic tale entitled Miss Innocence (1956). In 1947 he published under the pseudonym of François Sauvage Plus près de toi in the sentimental collection Mélusine (Jean Froissart editions), along with Antoine Blondin and Jacques Laurent.

A former drug addict, he testifies to his struggle in his autobiographical accounts L'Héroïne : une vie (1987) and Le Testament d'un esclave (1991).

Salgues died in Boulogne-Billancourt at the age of 73.

== Oeuvre ==
=== Poetry ===
- Statue de l'Amertume
- Les Chants de Nathanaël. (1944)
- Bréviaire d'un Gitan (1945)

=== Novels ===
- La Disgrâce des Anges
- Le Jeune Homme endormi. (1946)
- Un ange américain. (1956)
- Miss Innocence. (1956)
- Les Taches du soleil. (1957)
- Le Triangle éternel. (1980)
- L'Empire des serpents.(1990)
- Les Amants de la guerre. (1994)
- Dom Juan 40 (1995)

=== Autobiographic tale ===
- L'Héroïne : une vie.(1987)
- Le Testament d'un esclave. (1991)
- La Drogue : le calvaire et la grâce. (1994)

=== Biographies ===
- James Dean ou le Mal de vivre (1957)
- L'or noir du Sahara : la pathétique aventure de Conrad Kilian (1958)
- Charles Aznavour. (1964)
- Malraux (1971), in cooperation with Pierre Galante
- Salvatore Adamo (1975)
- Gainsbourg ou la Provocation permanente.(1991)
