= Lavergne, Lot =

Lavergne
- Commune
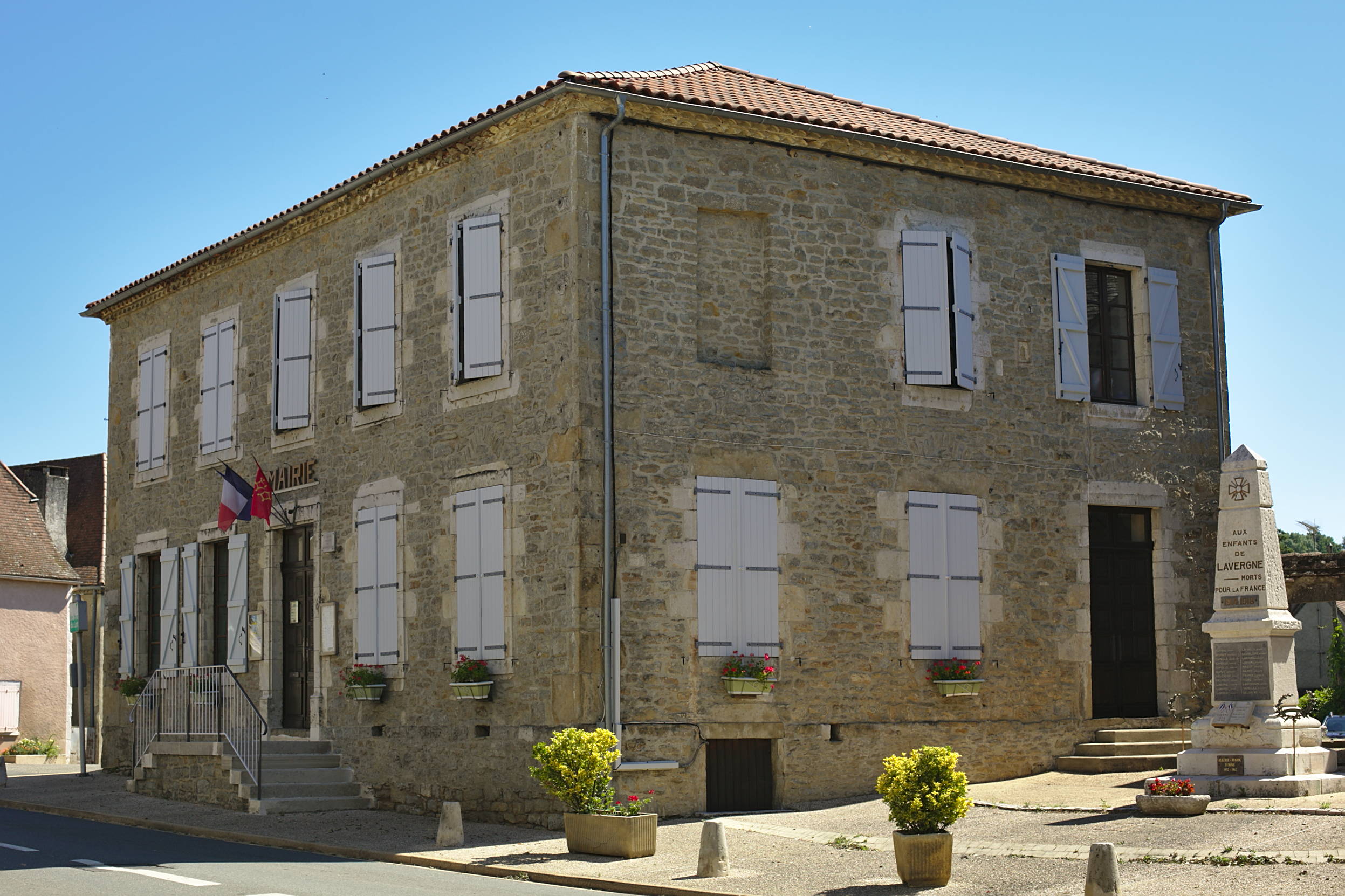
- The town hall in Lavergne
- Location of Lavergne
- Location within France Location within Occitanie
- Coordinates: 44°47′57″N 1°45′40″E
- Country: France
- Region: Occitania
- Department: Lot
- Arrondissement: Gourdon
- Canton: Gramat
- Intercommunality: Causses et Vallée de la Dordogne

Government
  - Mayor (2020–2026): Didier Bes
- Area^{1}: 8.82 km^{2} (3.41 sq mi)
- Elevation: 345 m (1,132 ft)
- Highest elevation: 424 m (1,391 ft)
- Lowest elevation: 295 m (968 ft)
- Population (2023): 489
  - Density: 55.4/km^{2} (144/sq mi)
- Time zone: UTC+01:00 (CET)
  - Summer (DST): UTC+02:00 (CEST)
- INSEE/Postal code: 46165 /46500
- ^{1} French Land Register data, which excludes lakes, ponds, glaciers > 1 km^{2} (0.386 sq mi or 247 acres) and river estuaries.

Lavergne (French pronunciation: [lavɛʁɲ]; Occitan: La Vèrnha) is a commune in the Lot department in south-western France.

== See also ==
- Communes of the Lot department
