= Reilhac, Lot =

Reilhac
- Commune
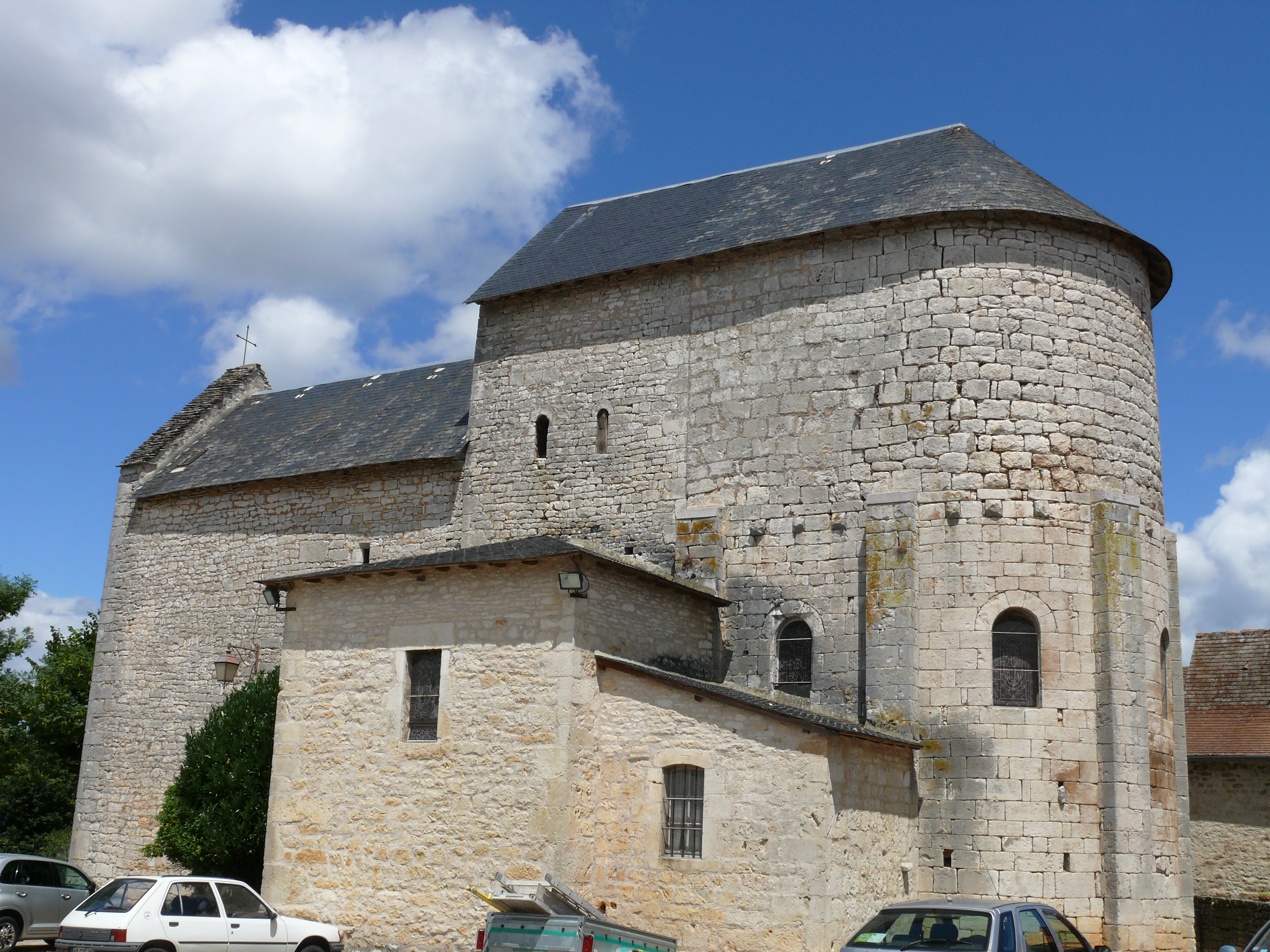
- The church of Saint-Hilaire
- Location of Reilhac
- Location within France Location within Occitanie
- Coordinates: 44°42′04″N 1°43′12″E
- Country: France
- Region: Occitania
- Department: Lot
- Arrondissement: Figeac
- Canton: Gramat
- Intercommunality: Grand-Figeac

Government
  - Mayor (2024–2026): Julie Joyeux
- Area^{1}: 12.98 km^{2} (5.01 sq mi)
- Highest elevation: 396 m (1,299 ft)
- Lowest elevation: 312 m (1,024 ft)
- Population (2023): 175
  - Density: 13.5/km^{2} (34.9/sq mi)
- Demonym: Reilhacois
- Time zone: UTC+01:00 (CET)
  - Summer (DST): UTC+02:00 (CEST)
- INSEE/Postal code: 46235 /46500
- ^{1} French Land Register data, which excludes lakes, ponds, glaciers > 1 km^{2} (0.386 sq mi or 247 acres) and river estuaries.

Reilhac (French pronunciation: [ʁɛjak]; Occitan: Relhac) is a commune in the Lot department in south-western France. It is also in the Gramat Causse, the largest and wildest of the four Quercy causses.

Exposed to an altered oceanic climate, no permanent watercourse is listed in the commune. Included in the Dordogne basin, the commune has a Natura 2000 site (the “central zone of the Causse de Gramat”) and a natural area of ecological, fauna, and flora.

Reilhac is a rural commune that will have 171 inhabitants in 2021 after experiencing a population peak of 449 inhabitants in 1806. It is part of the Gramat catchment area. Its inhabitants are called Reilhacois or Reilhacoises.

The inhabitants of Reilhac are the Reilhacois and the Reilhacoises.

== See also ==
- Communes of the Lot department
