= Anglars-Nozac =

Commune in Occitanie, France

- Commune
- Location of Anglars-Nozac
- Location within France Location within Occitanie
- Coordinates: 44°47′07″N 1°24′23″E
- Country: France
- Region: Occitania
- Department: Lot
- Arrondissement: Gourdon
- Canton: Gourdon
- Intercommunality: Quercy-Bouriane

Government
  - Mayor (2020–2026): Pascal Salanié
- Area^{1}: 9.83 km^{2} (3.80 sq mi)
- Elevation: 147 m (482 ft)
- Highest elevation: 303 m (994 ft)
- Lowest elevation: 117 m (384 ft)
- Population (2023): 400
  - Density: 41/km^{2} (110/sq mi)
- Time zone: UTC+01:00 (CET)
  - Summer (DST): UTC+02:00 (CEST)
- INSEE/Postal code: 46006 /46300
- ^{1} French Land Register data, which excludes lakes, ponds, glaciers > 1 km^{2} (0.386 sq mi or 247 acres) and river estuaries.

Anglars-Nozac (French pronunciation: [ɑ̃ɡlaʁ nozak]; Occitan: Anglars e Nosac) is a commune in the Lot department in southwestern France.

== Population ==
Historical population
Year	Pop.	±% p.a.
1968	283	—
1975	222	−3.41%
1982	243	+1.30%
1990	276	+1.60%
1999	260	−0.66%
2007	292	+1.46%
2012	330	+2.48%
2017	365	+2.04%
2023	400	+1.54%
Source: INSEE

== See also ==
- Communes of the Lot department
