= Salviac =

- Commune
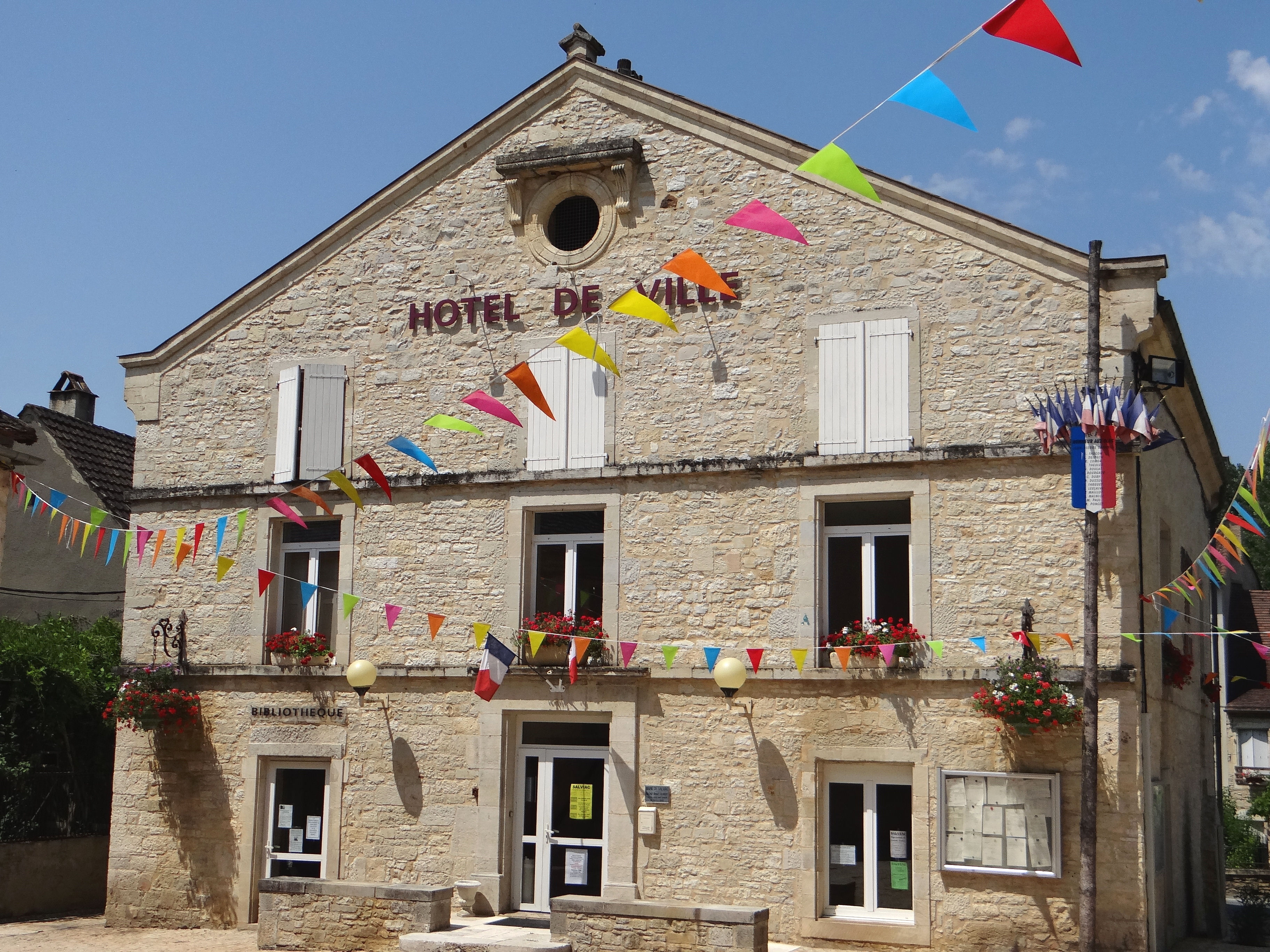
- The town hall in Salviac

- Coat of arms
- Location of Salviac
- Location within France Location within Occitanie
- Coordinates: 44°40′55″N 1°15′56″E
- Country: France
- Region: Occitania
- Department: Lot
- Arrondissement: Gourdon
- Canton: Gourdon
- Intercommunality: Cazals-Salviac

Government
  - Mayor (2020–2026): François Dols
- Area^{1}: 29.61 km^{2} (11.43 sq mi)
- Elevation: 159 m (522 ft)
- Highest elevation: 307 m (1,007 ft)
- Lowest elevation: 124 m (407 ft)
- Population (2023): 1,231
  - Density: 41.57/km^{2} (107.7/sq mi)
- Time zone: UTC+01:00 (CET)
  - Summer (DST): UTC+02:00 (CEST)
- INSEE/Postal code: 46297 /46340
- ^{1} French Land Register data, which excludes lakes, ponds, glaciers > 1 km^{2} (0.386 sq mi or 247 acres) and river estuaries.

Salviac (French pronunciation: [salvjak]) is a commune in the Lot department in south-western France.

== Geography ==
The river Céou forms part of the commune's north-eastern border.

== See also ==
- Communes of the Lot department
