= Cave of Reveillon =

Cave in Occitania, France

Réveillon
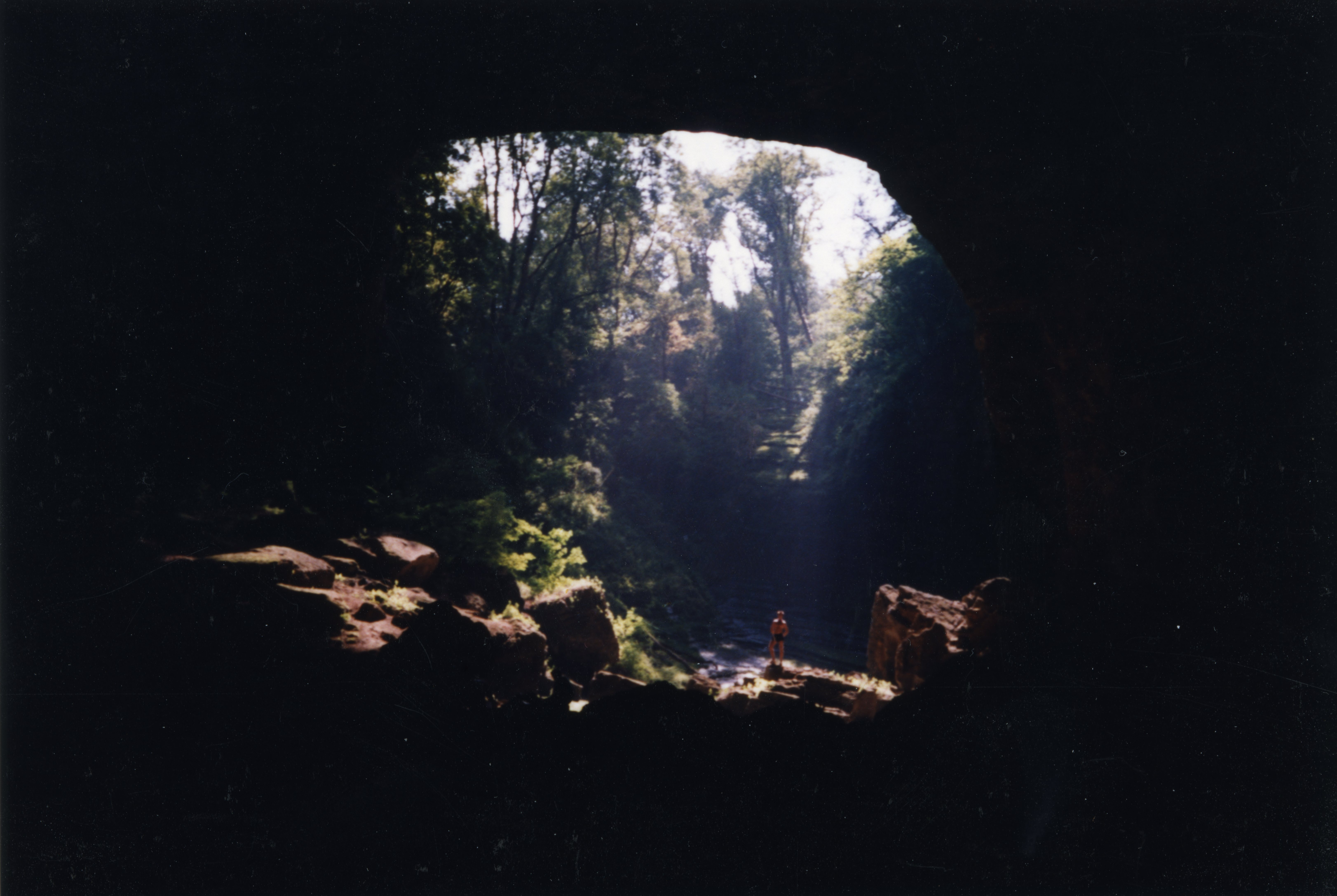
- Cave of Réveillon
- Interactive map of Réveillon
- Location: Alvignac, France
- Coordinates: 44°49′30.64″N 1°39′54.61″E

The Cave of Reveillon (French: Gouffre de Réveillon) is a French cave located near Alvignac, Lot department.
