= Saint-Cirq-Madelon =

- Commune
- Location of Saint-Cirq-Madelon
- Location within France Location within Occitanie
- Coordinates: 44°47′32″N 1°18′54″E
- Country: France
- Region: Occitania
- Department: Lot
- Arrondissement: Gourdon
- Canton: Gourdon
- Intercommunality: Quercy-Bouriane

Government
  - Mayor (2020–2026): Christine Maury
- Area^{1}: 7.49 km^{2} (2.89 sq mi)
- Elevation: 92 m (302 ft)
- Highest elevation: 188 m (617 ft)
- Lowest elevation: 90 m (300 ft)
- Population (2023): 153
  - Density: 20.4/km^{2} (52.9/sq mi)
- Time zone: UTC+01:00 (CET)
  - Summer (DST): UTC+02:00 (CEST)
- INSEE/Postal code: 46257 /46300
- ^{1} French Land Register data, which excludes lakes, ponds, glaciers > 1 km^{2} (0.386 sq mi or 247 acres) and river estuaries.

Saint-Cirq-Madelon is a commune in the Lot department in south-western France.

== See also ==
- Communes of the Lot department
