= Rampoux =

- Commune
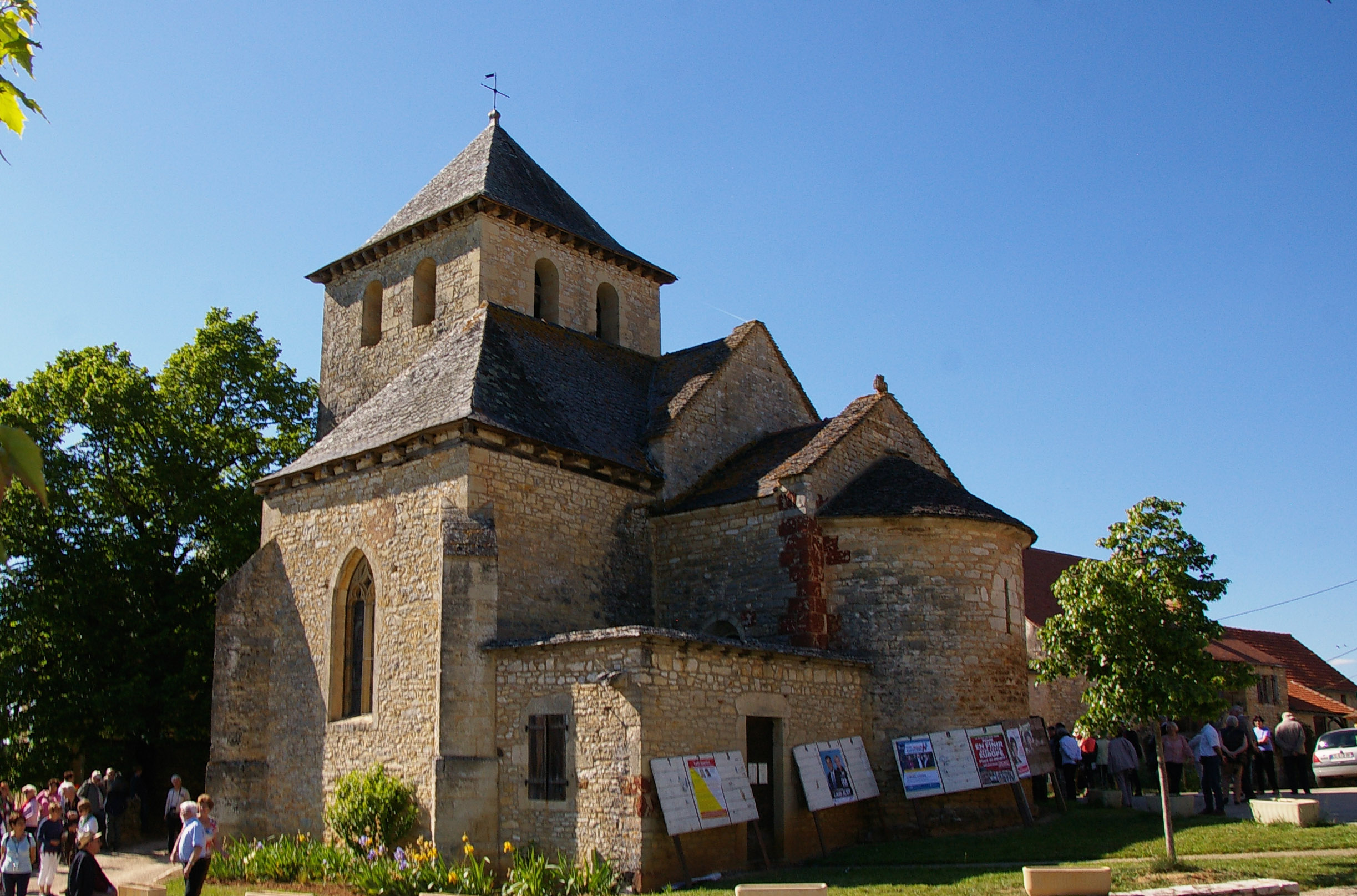
- The church of Saint-Pierre-ès-Liens
- Location of Rampoux
- Location within France Location within Occitanie
- Coordinates: 44°38′33″N 1°18′39″E
- Country: France
- Region: Occitania
- Department: Lot
- Arrondissement: Gourdon
- Canton: Gourdon
- Intercommunality: Cazals-Salviac

Government
  - Mayor (2020–2026): Pascal Périé
- Area^{1}: 5.83 km^{2} (2.25 sq mi)
- Elevation: 269 m (883 ft)
- Highest elevation: 306 m (1,004 ft)
- Lowest elevation: 176 m (577 ft)
- Population (2023): 104
  - Density: 17.8/km^{2} (46.2/sq mi)
- Time zone: UTC+01:00 (CET)
  - Summer (DST): UTC+02:00 (CEST)
- INSEE/Postal code: 46234 /46340
- ^{1} French Land Register data, which excludes lakes, ponds, glaciers > 1 km^{2} (0.386 sq mi or 247 acres) and river estuaries.

Rampoux (French pronunciation: [ʁɑ̃pu]; Occitan: Rampons) is a commune in the Lot department in south-western France.

== See also ==
- Communes of the Lot department
