= Milhac =

- Commune
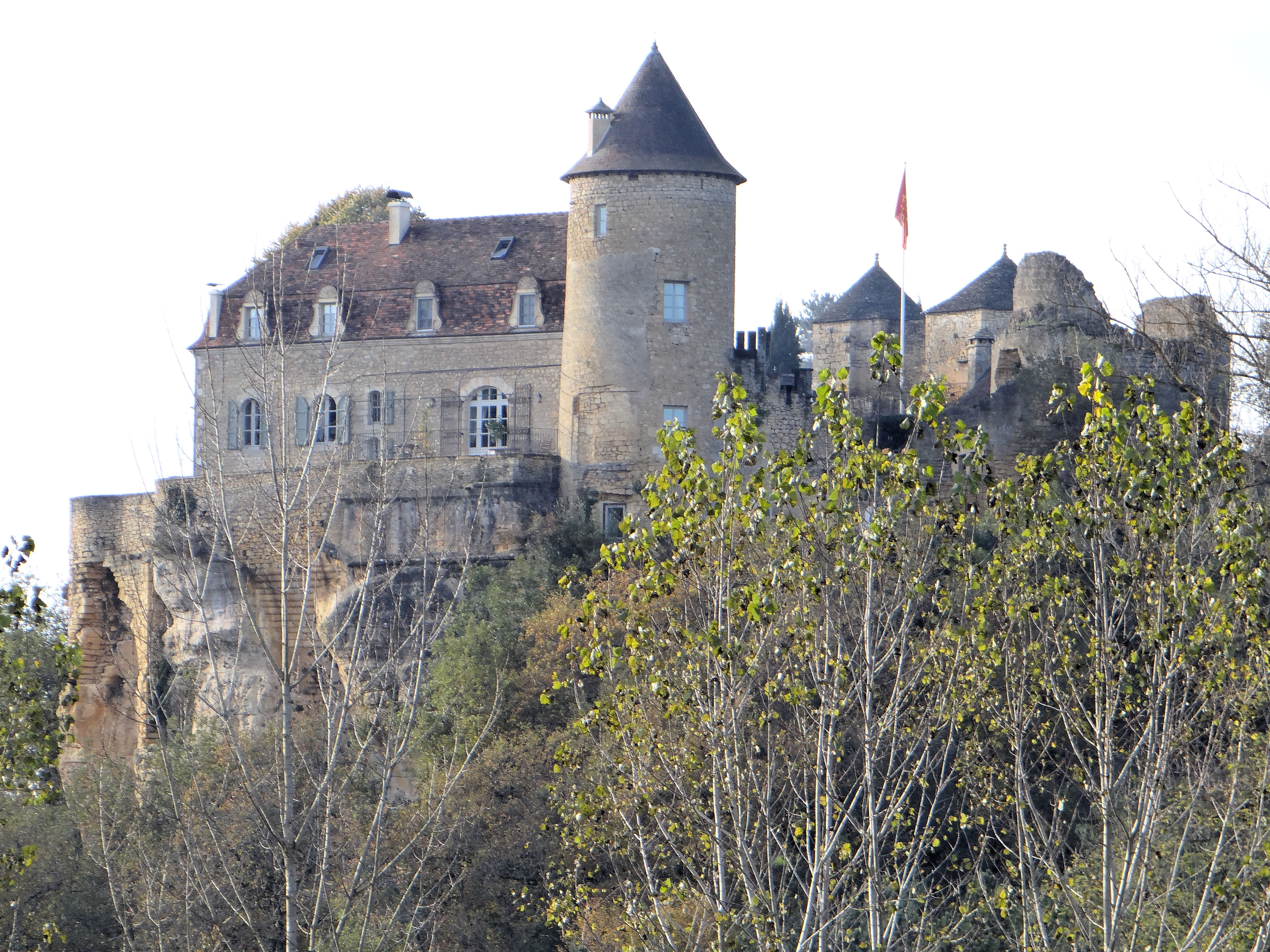
- The château in Milhac
- Location of Milhac
- Location within France Location within Occitanie
- Coordinates: 44°47′57″N 1°20′54″E
- Country: France
- Region: Occitania
- Department: Lot
- Arrondissement: Gourdon
- Canton: Gourdon
- Intercommunality: Quercy-Bouriane

Government
  - Mayor (2020–2026): Claude Vigié
- Area^{1}: 5.42 km^{2} (2.09 sq mi)
- Elevation: 153 m (502 ft)
- Highest elevation: 200 m (660 ft)
- Lowest elevation: 90 m (300 ft)
- Population (2023): 198
  - Density: 36.5/km^{2} (94.6/sq mi)
- Time zone: UTC+01:00 (CET)
  - Summer (DST): UTC+02:00 (CEST)
- INSEE/Postal code: 46194 /46300
- ^{1} French Land Register data, which excludes lakes, ponds, glaciers > 1 km^{2} (0.386 sq mi or 247 acres) and river estuaries.

Milhac (French pronunciation: [mijak]; Occitan: Milhac) is a commune in the Lot department in south-western France.

== See also ==
- Communes of the Lot department
