= Marminiac =

- Commune
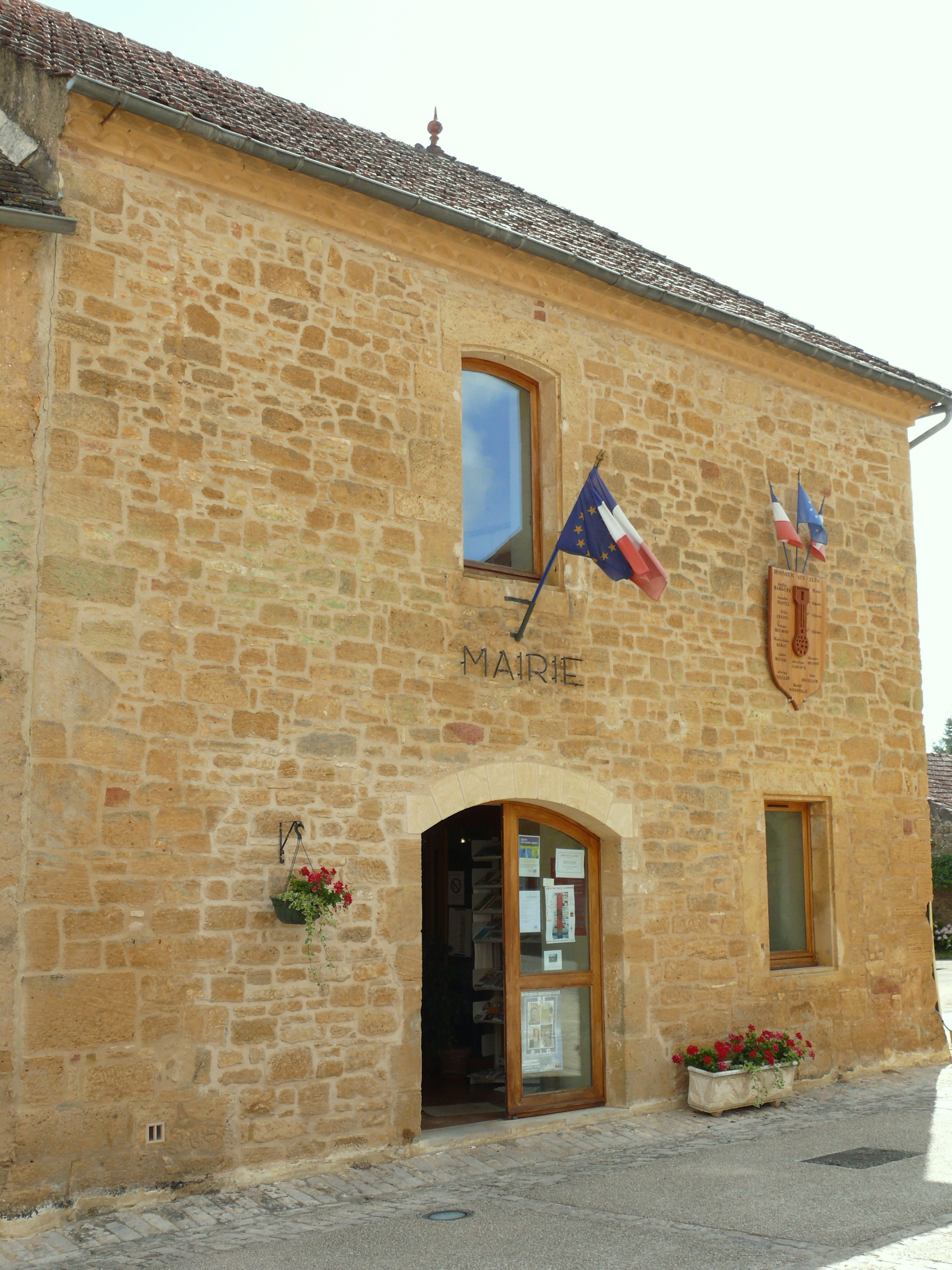
- The town hall in Marminiac
- Location of Marminiac
- Location within France Location within Occitanie
- Coordinates: 44°40′00″N 1°11′41″E
- Country: France
- Region: Occitania
- Department: Lot
- Arrondissement: Gourdon
- Canton: Gourdon
- Intercommunality: Cazals-Salviac

Government
  - Mayor (2020–2026): Rachel French
- Area^{1}: 22.88 km^{2} (8.83 sq mi)
- Elevation: 281 m (922 ft)
- Highest elevation: 343 m (1,125 ft)
- Lowest elevation: 177 m (581 ft)
- Population (2023): 349
  - Density: 15.3/km^{2} (39.5/sq mi)
- Time zone: UTC+01:00 (CET)
  - Summer (DST): UTC+02:00 (CEST)
- INSEE/Postal code: 46184 /46250
- ^{1} French Land Register data, which excludes lakes, ponds, glaciers > 1 km^{2} (0.386 sq mi or 247 acres) and river estuaries.

Marminiac (French pronunciation: [maʁminjak]; Occitan: Marminhac) is a commune in the Lot department in south-western France.

== See also ==
- Communes of the Lot department
