= Flaujac-Gare =

- Commune
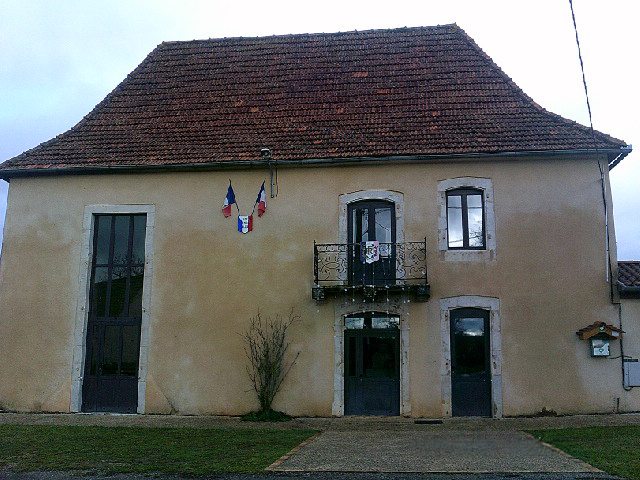
- Town hall
- Location of Flaujac-Gare
- Location within France Location within Occitanie
- Coordinates: 44°42′36″N 1°46′41″E
- Country: France
- Region: Occitania
- Department: Lot
- Arrondissement: Figeac
- Canton: Gramat
- Intercommunality: Grand-Figeac

Government
  - Mayor (2020–2026): Alain Mathieu
- Area^{1}: 8.09 km^{2} (3.12 sq mi)
- Elevation: 380 m (1,250 ft)
- Highest elevation: 351 m (1,152 ft)
- Lowest elevation: 308 m (1,010 ft)
- Population (2023): 84
  - Density: 10/km^{2} (27/sq mi)
- Time zone: UTC+01:00 (CET)
  - Summer (DST): UTC+02:00 (CEST)
- INSEE/Postal code: 46104 /46320
- ^{1} French Land Register data, which excludes lakes, ponds, glaciers > 1 km^{2} (0.386 sq mi or 247 acres) and river estuaries.

Flaujac-Gare (French pronunciation: [floʒak ɡaʁ]; Occitan: Flaujac Estacion) is a commune in the Lot department in south-western France. It is a village with 96 residents in 2018, 300 miles south of Paris.

== See also ==
- Communes of the Lot department
