= Bio, Lot =

Bio
- Commune
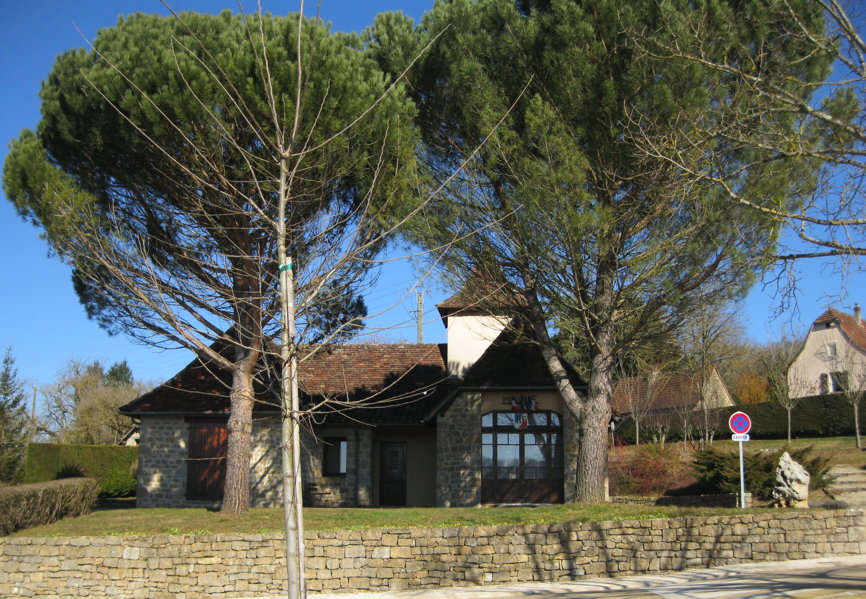
- The town hall in Bio
- Location of Bio
- Location within France Location within Occitanie
- Coordinates: 44°47′01″N 1°47′08″E
- Country: France
- Region: Occitania
- Department: Lot
- Arrondissement: Gourdon
- Canton: Gramat
- Intercommunality: Causses et Vallée de la Dordogne

Government
  - Mayor (2020–2026): Philippe Leonard
- Area^{1}: 10.79 km^{2} (4.17 sq mi)
- Elevation: 359 m (1,178 ft)
- Highest elevation: 421 m (1,381 ft)
- Lowest elevation: 295 m (968 ft)
- Population (2023): 350
  - Density: 32/km^{2} (84/sq mi)
- Time zone: UTC+01:00 (CET)
  - Summer (DST): UTC+02:00 (CEST)
- INSEE/Postal code: 46030 /46500
- ^{1} French Land Register data, which excludes lakes, ponds, glaciers > 1 km^{2} (0.386 sq mi or 247 acres) and river estuaries.

Bio (French pronunciation: [bjo]; Occitan: Viá) is a commune in the Lot department in southwestern France.

== Population ==
Historical population
Year	Pop.	±% p.a.
1968	258	—
1975	243	−0.85%
1982	224	−1.16%
1990	214	−0.57%
1999	256	+2.01%
2007	292	+1.66%
2012	332	+2.60%
2017	348	+0.95%
2023	350	+0.10%
Source: INSEE

== See also ==
- Communes of the Lot department
