= Cazals, Lot =

Cazals
- Commune
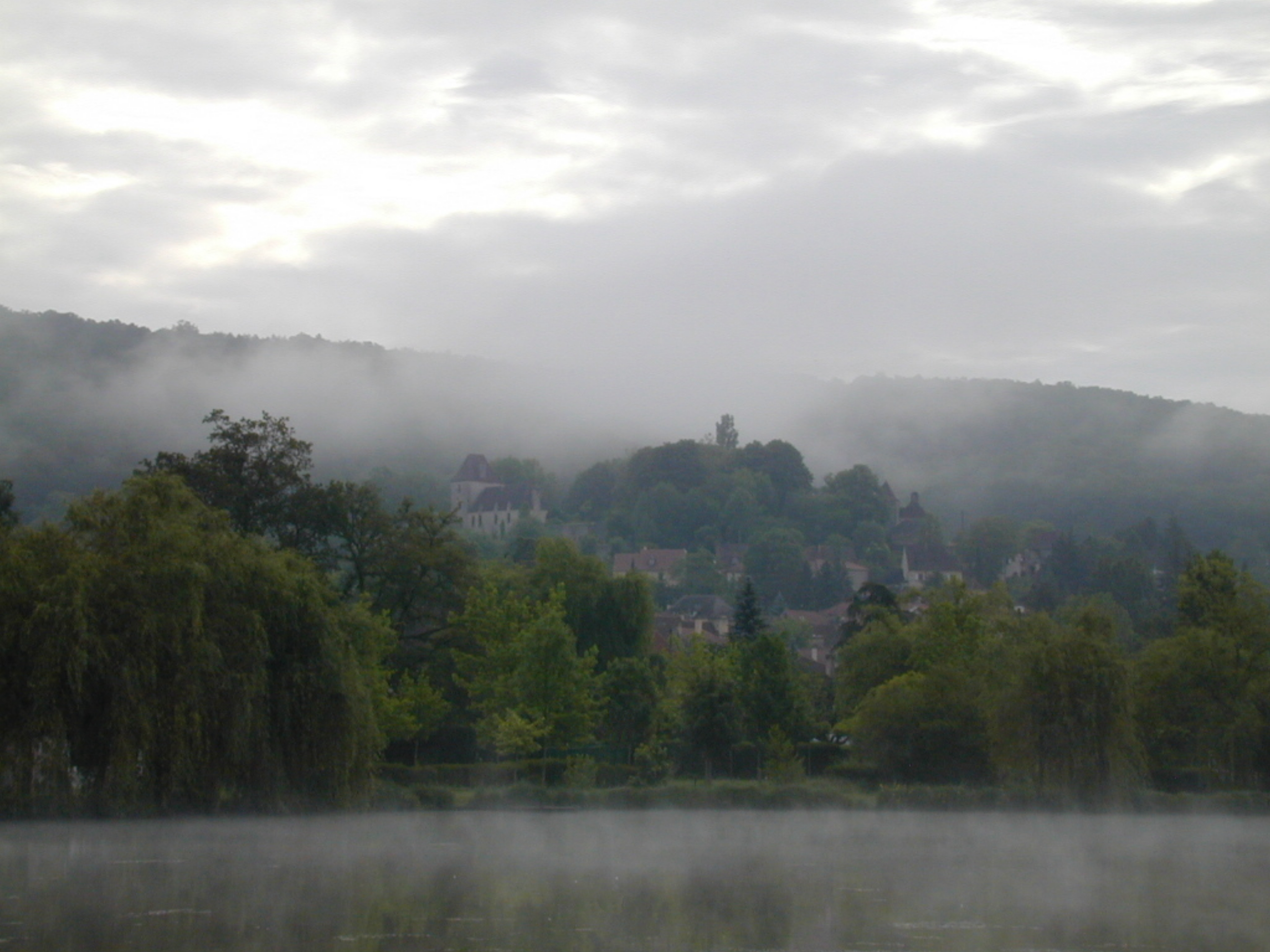
- Dawn mist over Cazals
- Location of Cazals
- Location within France Location within Occitanie
- Coordinates: 44°38′38″N 1°13′38″E
- Country: France
- Region: Occitania
- Department: Lot
- Arrondissement: Gourdon
- Canton: Gourdon
- Intercommunality: Cazals-Salviac

Government
  - Mayor (2020–2026): Laurent Alazard
- Area^{1}: 10.57 km^{2} (4.08 sq mi)
- Elevation: 177 m (581 ft)
- Highest elevation: 324 m (1,063 ft)
- Lowest elevation: 157 m (515 ft)
- Population (2023): 659
  - Density: 62.3/km^{2} (161/sq mi)
- Time zone: UTC+01:00 (CET)
  - Summer (DST): UTC+02:00 (CEST)
- INSEE/Postal code: 46066 /46250
- ^{1} French Land Register data, which excludes lakes, ponds, glaciers > 1 km^{2} (0.386 sq mi or 247 acres) and river estuaries.

Cazals (French pronunciation: [kazals]; Occitan: Casals) is a commune in the Lot department in south-western France.

The poet and novelist Yves Salgues (1924–1997) was born in Cazals.

== See also ==
- Communes of the Lot department
