= Saint-Projet, Lot =

Saint-Projet
- Commune
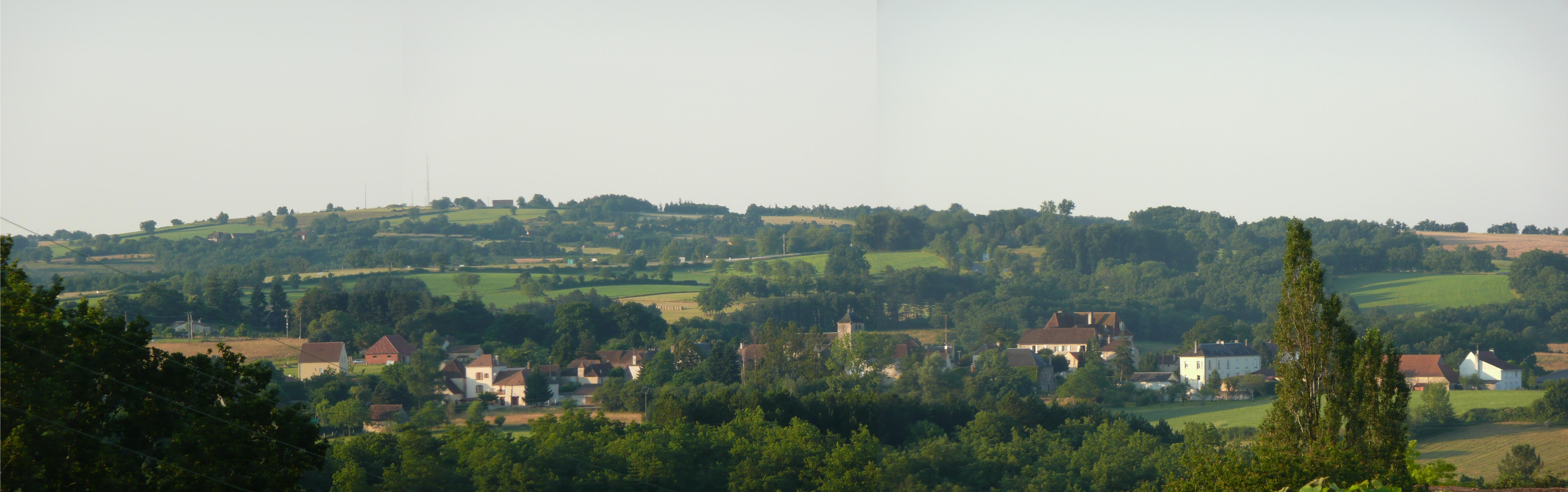
- View of the villages of Saint-Projet
- Location of Saint-Projet
- Location within France Location within Occitanie
- Coordinates: 44°44′45″N 1°29′29″E
- Country: France
- Region: Occitania
- Department: Lot
- Arrondissement: Gourdon
- Canton: Gourdon
- Intercommunality: Quercy-Bouriane

Government
  - Mayor (2020–2026): Guy Rossignol
- Area^{1}: 15.83 km^{2} (6.11 sq mi)
- Elevation: 351 m (1,152 ft)
- Highest elevation: 407 m (1,335 ft)
- Lowest elevation: 184 m (604 ft)
- Population (2023): 363
  - Density: 22.9/km^{2} (59.4/sq mi)
- Time zone: UTC+01:00 (CET)
  - Summer (DST): UTC+02:00 (CEST)
- INSEE/Postal code: 46290 /46300
- ^{1} French Land Register data, which excludes lakes, ponds, glaciers > 1 km^{2} (0.386 sq mi or 247 acres) and river estuaries.

Saint-Projet (French pronunciation: [sɛ̃ pʁɔʒɛ]; Occitan: Sent Proget) is a commune in the Lot department in south-western France.

== See also ==
- Communes of the Lot department
