= Canton of Gourdon =

Coordinates: 44.74°N 1.38°E

The canton of Gourdon is an administrative division of the Lot department, southern France. Its borders were modified at the French canton reorganisation which came into effect in March 2015. Its seat is in Gourdon.

It consists of the following communes:

1. Anglars-Nozac
2. Cazals
3. Dégagnac
4. Gindou
5. Gourdon
6. Lavercantière
7. Léobard
8. Marminiac
9. Milhac
10. Payrignac
11. Rampoux
12. Rouffilhac
13. Saint-Cirq-Madelon
14. Saint-Cirq-Souillaguet
15. Saint-Clair
16. Saint-Projet
17. Salviac
18. Le Vigan-en-Quercy
