= Albiac, Lot =

Albiac
- Commune
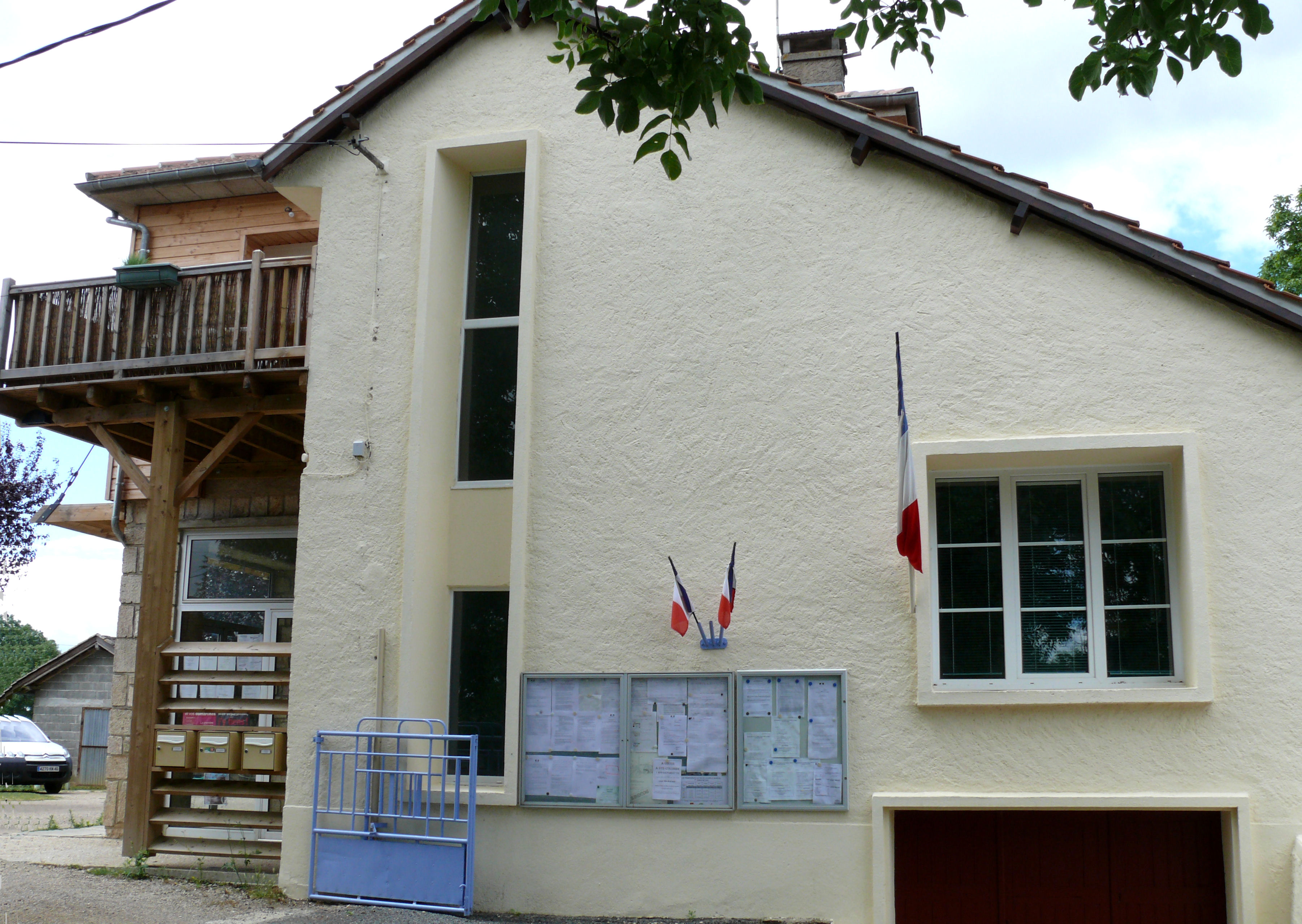
- Town hall
- Location of Albiac
- Location within France Location within Occitanie
- Coordinates: 44°46′00″N 1°48′43″E
- Country: France
- Region: Occitania
- Department: Lot
- Arrondissement: Figeac
- Canton: Gramat
- Intercommunality: Grand-Figeac

Government
  - Mayor (2020–2026): Marie Berthoumieu
- Area^{1}: 3.83 km^{2} (1.48 sq mi)
- Elevation: 386 m (1,266 ft)
- Highest elevation: 430 m (1,410 ft)
- Lowest elevation: 324 m (1,063 ft)
- Population (2023): 95
  - Density: 25/km^{2} (64/sq mi)
- Time zone: UTC+01:00 (CET)
  - Summer (DST): UTC+02:00 (CEST)
- INSEE/Postal code: 46002 /46500
- ^{1} French Land Register data, which excludes lakes, ponds, glaciers > 1 km^{2} (0.386 sq mi or 247 acres) and river estuaries.

Albiac (French pronunciation: [albjak]) is a commune in the Lot department in southwestern France.

== Population ==
Historical population
Year	Pop.	±% p.a.
1968	77	—
1975	70	−1.35%
1982	72	+0.40%
1990	60	−2.25%
1999	66	+1.06%
2007	81	+2.59%
2012	91	+2.36%
2017	70	−5.11%
2023	95	+5.22%
Source: INSEE

== See also ==
- Communes of the Lot department
