= Léobard =

- Commune
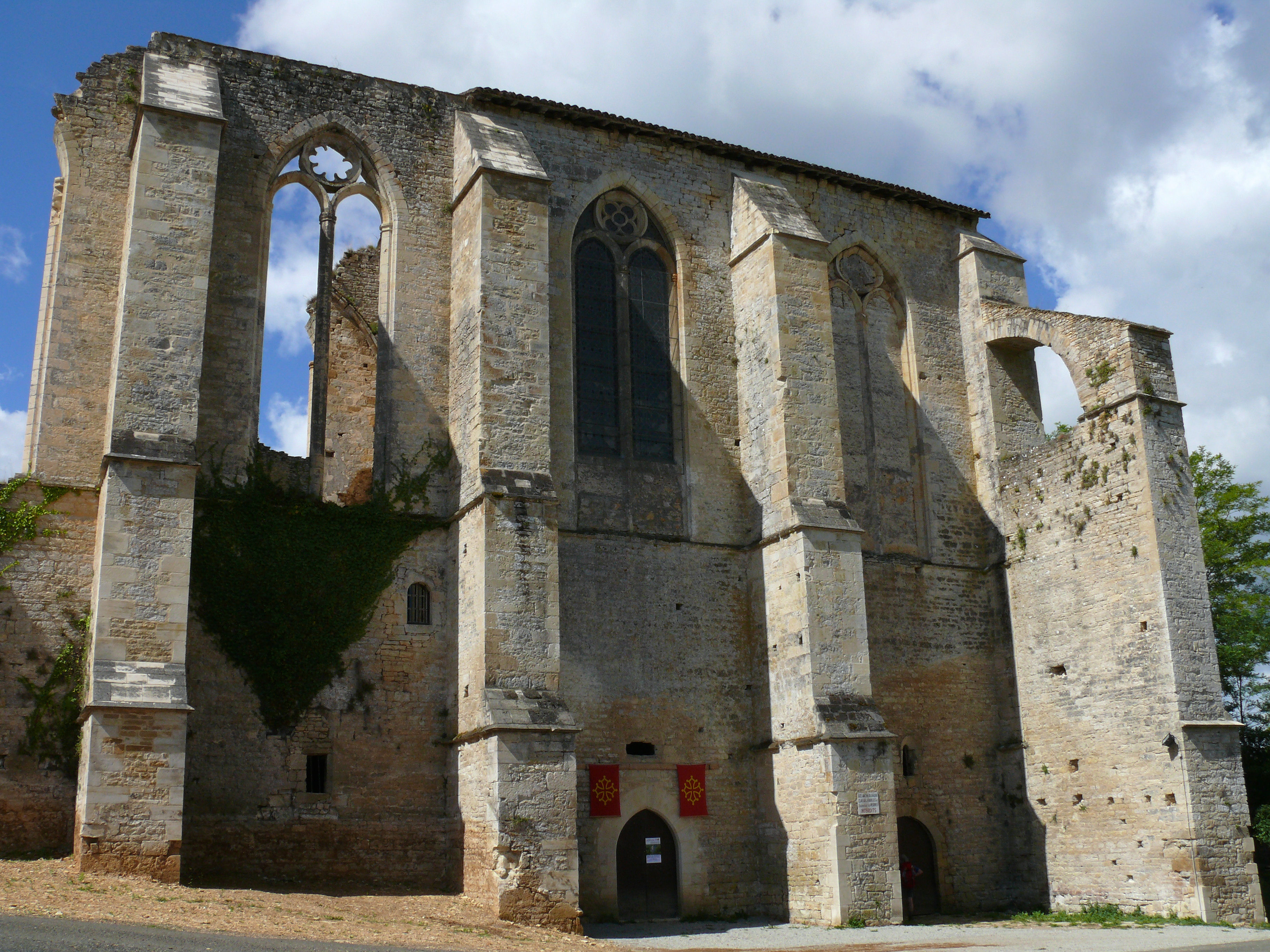
- The abbey in Léobard
- Location of Léobard
- Location within France Location within Occitanie
- Coordinates: 44°43′23″N 1°18′39″E
- Country: France
- Region: Occitania
- Department: Lot
- Arrondissement: Gourdon
- Canton: Gourdon
- Intercommunality: Cazals-Salviac

Government
  - Mayor (2020–2026): André Vayssières
- Area^{1}: 10.30 km^{2} (3.98 sq mi)
- Elevation: 253 m (830 ft)
- Highest elevation: 263 m (863 ft)
- Lowest elevation: 130 m (430 ft)
- Population (2023): 234
  - Density: 22.7/km^{2} (58.8/sq mi)
- Time zone: UTC+01:00 (CET)
  - Summer (DST): UTC+02:00 (CEST)
- INSEE/Postal code: 46169 /46300
- ^{1} French Land Register data, which excludes lakes, ponds, glaciers > 1 km^{2} (0.386 sq mi or 247 acres) and river estuaries.

Léobard (French pronunciation: [le.ɔbaʁ]; Occitan: Liaubard) is a commune in the Lot department in south-western France.

== Geography ==
The river Céou flows westward through the southern part of the commune.

== See also ==
- Communes of the Lot department
