= Canton of Gramat =

Coordinates: 44°47′39″N 1°41′59″E

Gramat
- Canton
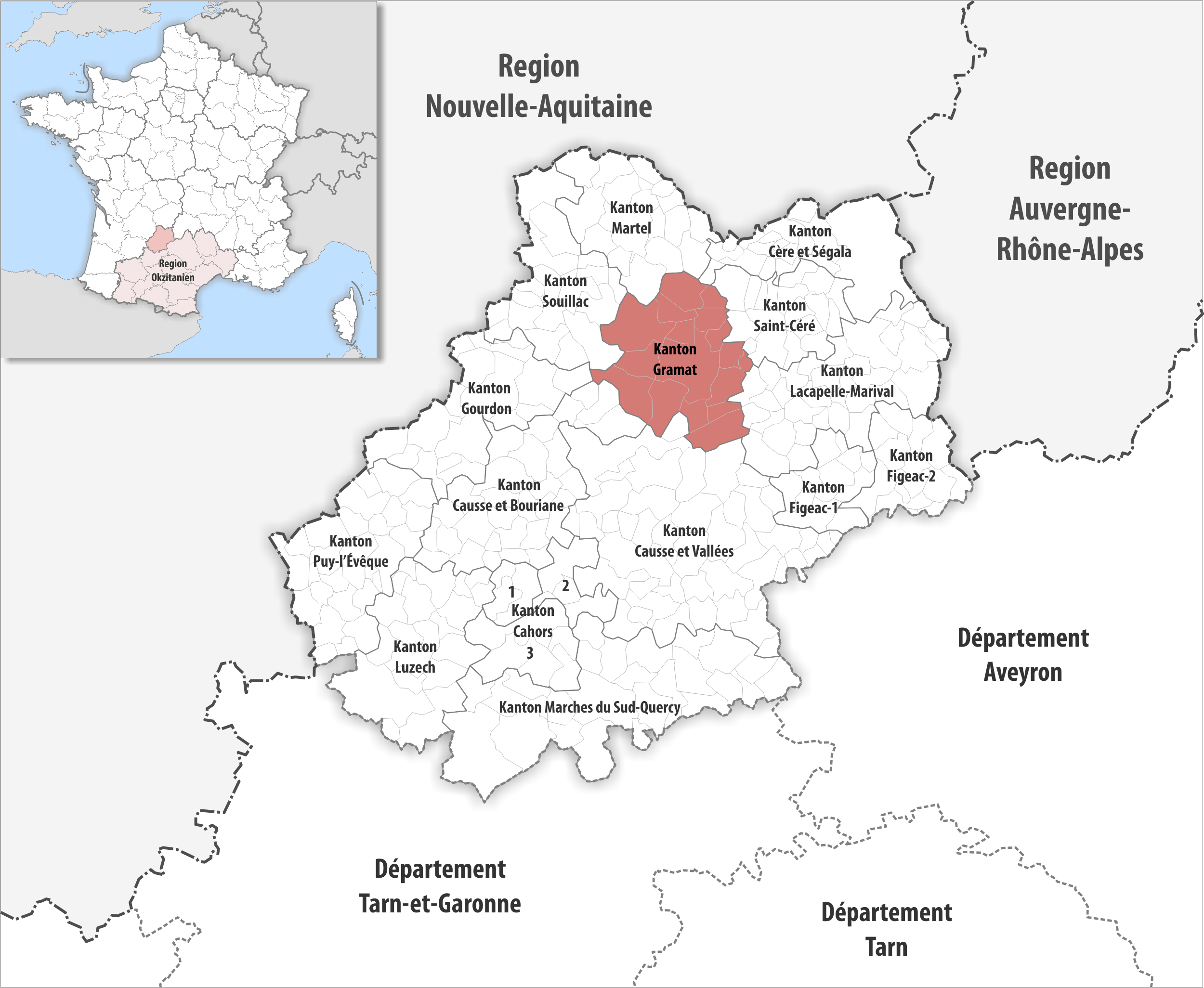
- Country: France
- Region: Occitania
- Department: Lot
- No. of communes: {{{nbcomm}}}
- Area: 351.04 km^{2} (135.54 sq mi)
- Population (2023): 8,576
  - Density: 24.43/km^{2} (63.27/sq mi)
- INSEE code: 4610

The canton of Gramat is a canton in France. Since the French canton reorganisation which came into effect in March 2015, the communes of the canton of Gramat are:

1. Albiac
2. Alvignac
3. Le Bastit
4. Bio
5. Carlucet
6. Couzou
7. Durbans
8. Flaujac-Gare
9. Gramat
10. Issendolus
11. Lavergne
12. Miers
13. Padirac
14. Reilhac
15. Rignac
16. Rocamadour
17. Thégra
