= Rignac, Lot =

Rignac
- Commune
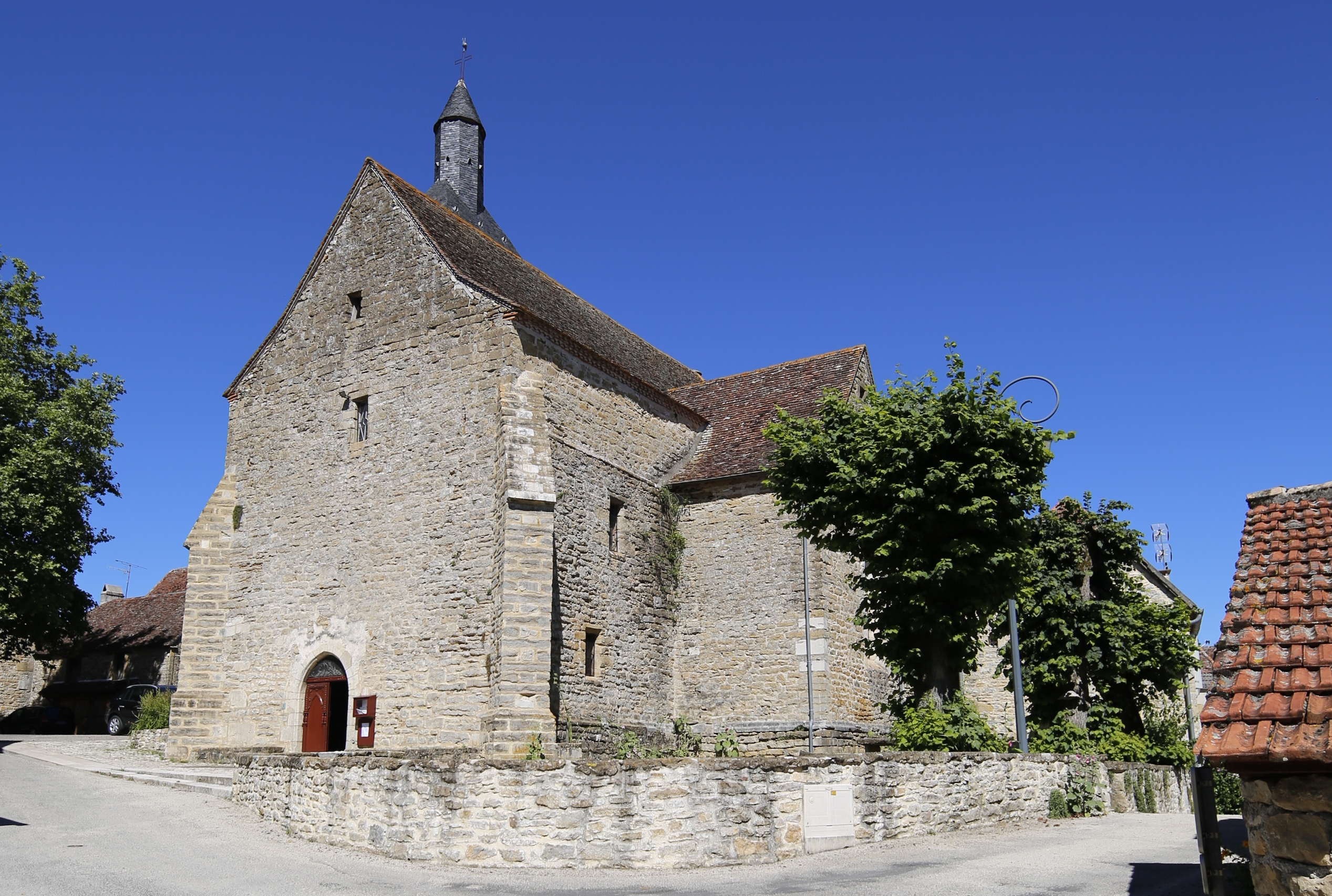
- The church of Saint-Germain
- Location of Rignac
- Location within France Location within Occitanie
- Coordinates: 44°48′27″N 1°41′46″E
- Country: France
- Region: Occitania
- Department: Lot
- Arrondissement: Gourdon
- Canton: Gramat
- Intercommunality: Causses et Vallée de la Dordogne

Government
  - Mayor (2020–2026): Francis Lacayrouze
- Area^{1}: 9.64 km^{2} (3.72 sq mi)
- Elevation: 210 m (690 ft)
- Highest elevation: 423 m (1,388 ft)
- Lowest elevation: 270 m (890 ft)
- Population (2023): 294
  - Density: 30.5/km^{2} (79.0/sq mi)
- Time zone: UTC+01:00 (CET)
  - Summer (DST): UTC+02:00 (CEST)
- INSEE/Postal code: 46238 /46500
- ^{1} French Land Register data, which excludes lakes, ponds, glaciers > 1 km^{2} (0.386 sq mi or 247 acres) and river estuaries.

Rignac (French pronunciation: [ʁiɲak]; Occitan: Rinhac) is a commune in the Lot department in south-western France.

== See also ==
- Communes of the Lot department
