= Payrignac =

- Commune
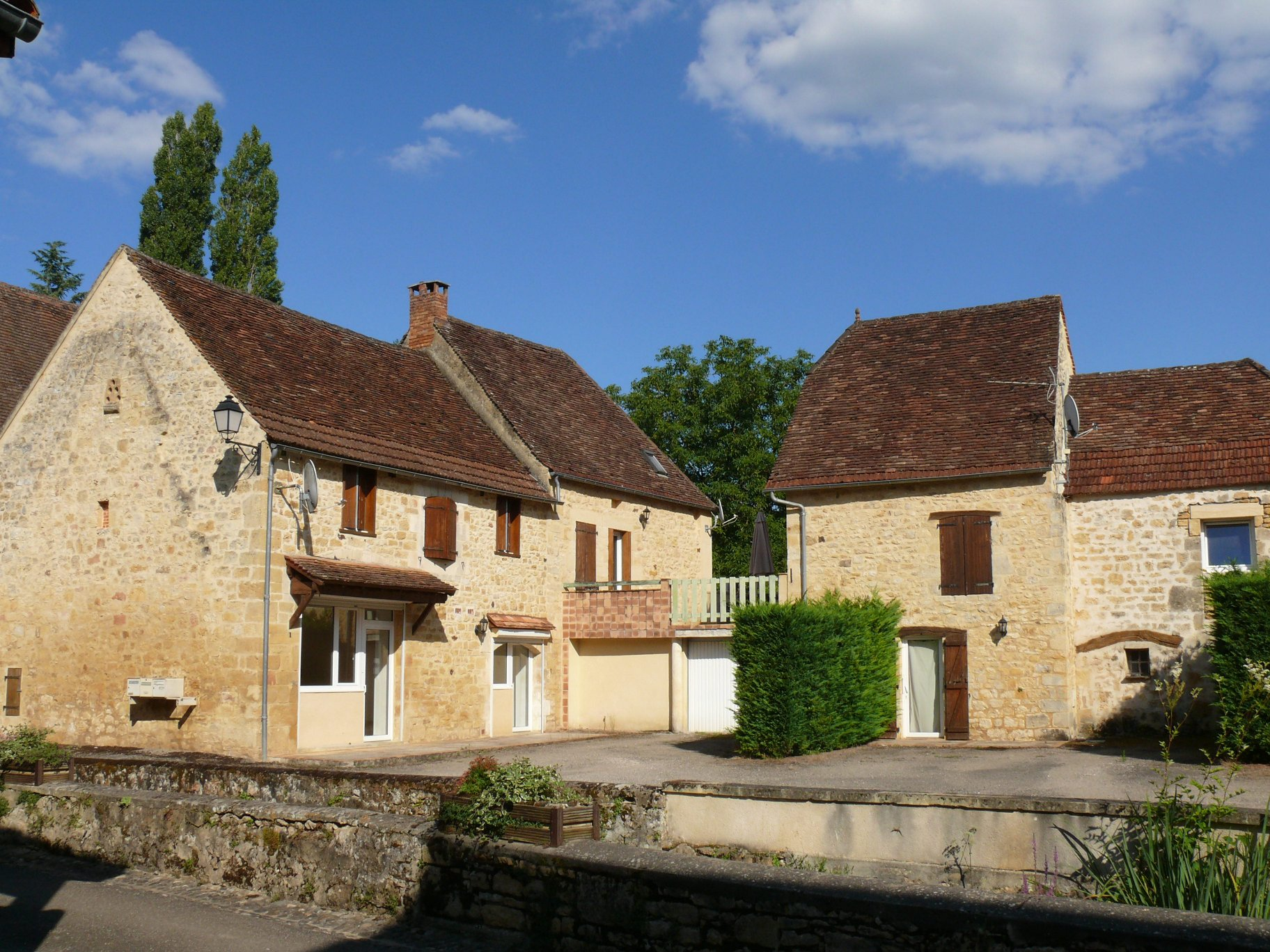
- Houses in the village

- Coat of arms
- Location of Payrignac
- Location within France Location within Occitanie
- Coordinates: 44°45′24″N 1°21′04″E
- Country: France
- Region: Occitania
- Department: Lot
- Arrondissement: Gourdon
- Canton: Gourdon
- Intercommunality: CC Quercy-Bouriane

Government
  - Mayor (2020–2026): Jérôme Maleville
- Area^{1}: 21.64 km^{2} (8.36 sq mi)
- Elevation: 150 m (490 ft)
- Highest elevation: 232 m (761 ft)
- Lowest elevation: 95 m (312 ft)
- Population (2023): 651
  - Density: 30.1/km^{2} (77.9/sq mi)
- Time zone: UTC+01:00 (CET)
  - Summer (DST): UTC+02:00 (CEST)
- INSEE/Postal code: 46216 /46300
- ^{1} French Land Register data, which excludes lakes, ponds, glaciers > 1 km^{2} (0.386 sq mi or 247 acres) and river estuaries.

Payrignac (French pronunciation: [pɛʁiɲak]；Occitan: Pairinhac) is a commune in the Lot department in south-western France.

== See also ==
- Communes of the Lot department
- Cougnac Cave
