= Saint-Paul-de-Loubressac =

- Part of Saint-Paul-Flaugnac
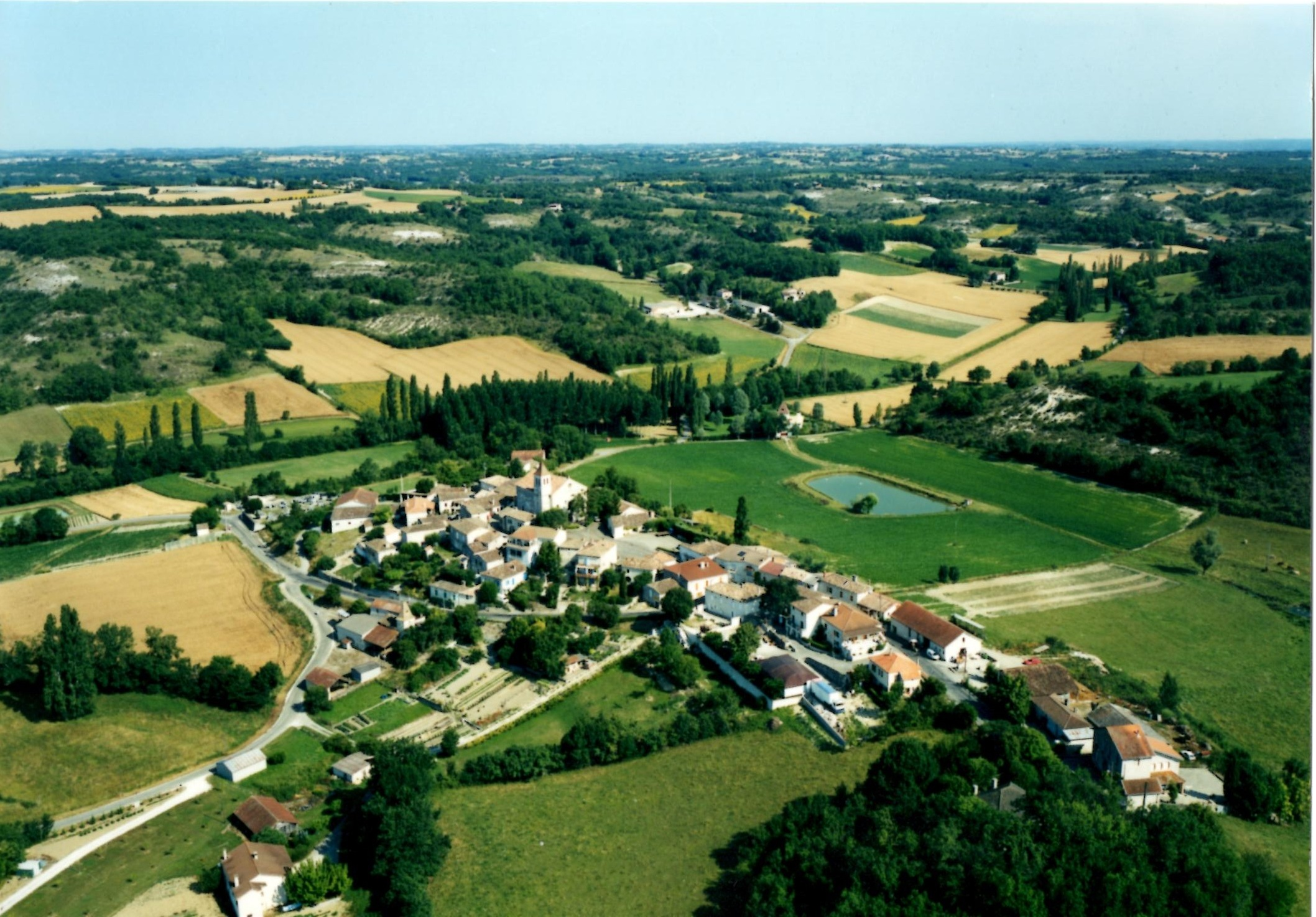
- An aerial view of Saint-Paul-de-Loubressac
- Location of Saint-Paul-de-Loubressac
- Location within France Location within Occitanie
- Coordinates: 44°17′53″N 1°26′57″E
- Country: France
- Region: Occitania
- Department: Lot
- Arrondissement: Cahors
- Canton: Marches du Sud-Quercy
- Commune: Saint-Paul-Flaugnac
- Area^{1}: 20.19 km^{2} (7.80 sq mi)
- Elevation: 270 m (890 ft)
- Highest elevation: 285 m (935 ft)
- Lowest elevation: 134 m (440 ft)
- Population (2022): 576
  - Density: 28.5/km^{2} (73.9/sq mi)
- Time zone: UTC+01:00 (CET)
  - Summer (DST): UTC+02:00 (CEST)
- Postal code: 46170
- ^{1} French Land Register data, which excludes lakes, ponds, glaciers > 1 km^{2} (0.386 sq mi or 247 acres) and river estuaries.

Saint-Paul-de-Loubressac (French pronunciation: [sɛ̃ pɔl də lubʁəsak]; Languedocien: Sent Pau de Laubreçac) is a former commune in the Lot department in south-western France. On 1 January 2016, it was merged into the new commune of Saint-Paul-Flaugnac. Its population was 576 in 2022.

== See also ==
- Communes of the Lot department
