= Flaugnac =

Commune in Lot, France

- Part of Saint-Paul-Flaugnac
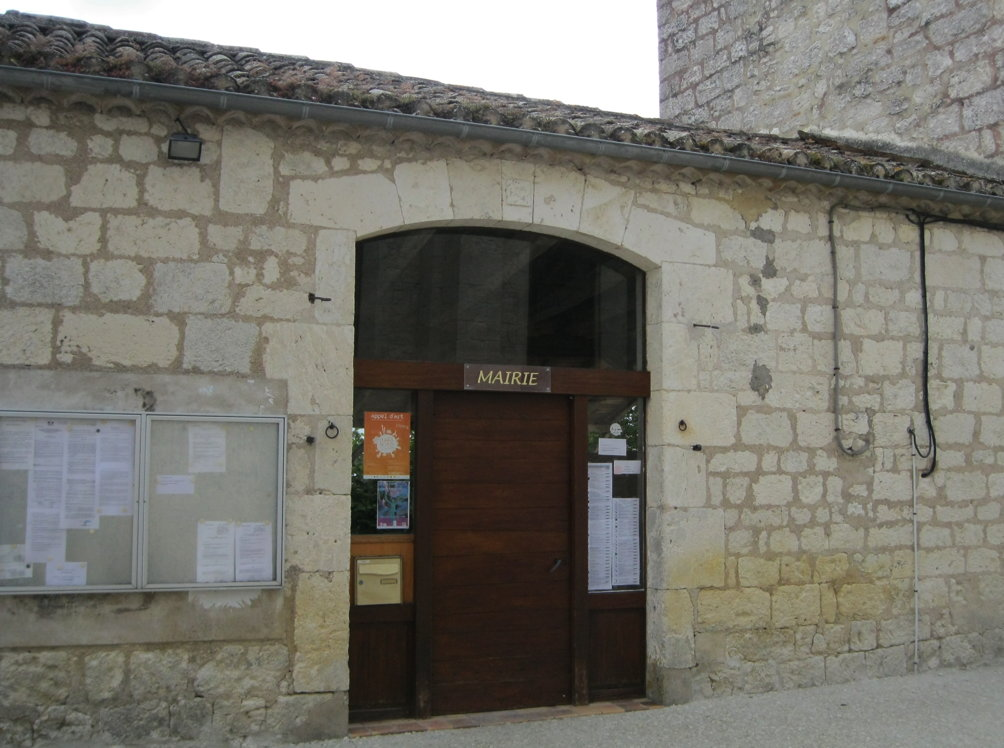
- The town hall in Flaugnac
- Location of Flaugnac
- Location within France Location within Occitanie
- Coordinates: 44°16′44″N 1°23′40″E
- Country: France
- Region: Occitania
- Department: Lot
- Arrondissement: Cahors
- Canton: Marches du Sud-Quercy
- Commune: Saint-Paul-Flaugnac
- Area^{1}: 30.96 km^{2} (11.95 sq mi)
- Elevation: 244 m (801 ft)
- Highest elevation: 299 m (981 ft)
- Lowest elevation: 143 m (469 ft)
- Population (2022): 405
  - Density: 13.1/km^{2} (33.9/sq mi)
- Time zone: UTC+01:00 (CET)
  - Summer (DST): UTC+02:00 (CEST)
- Postal code: 46170
- ^{1} French Land Register data, which excludes lakes, ponds, glaciers > 1 km^{2} (0.386 sq mi or 247 acres) and river estuaries.

Flaugnac (French pronunciation: [floɲak]; Languedocien: Flaunhac) is a former commune in the Lot department in south-western France. On 1 January 2016, it was merged into the new commune of Saint-Paul-Flaugnac.

== Geography ==
The Barguelonne forms most of the commune's northwestern border.

== See also ==
- Communes of the Lot department
