= Sainte-Alauzie =

- Part of Castelnau-Montratier
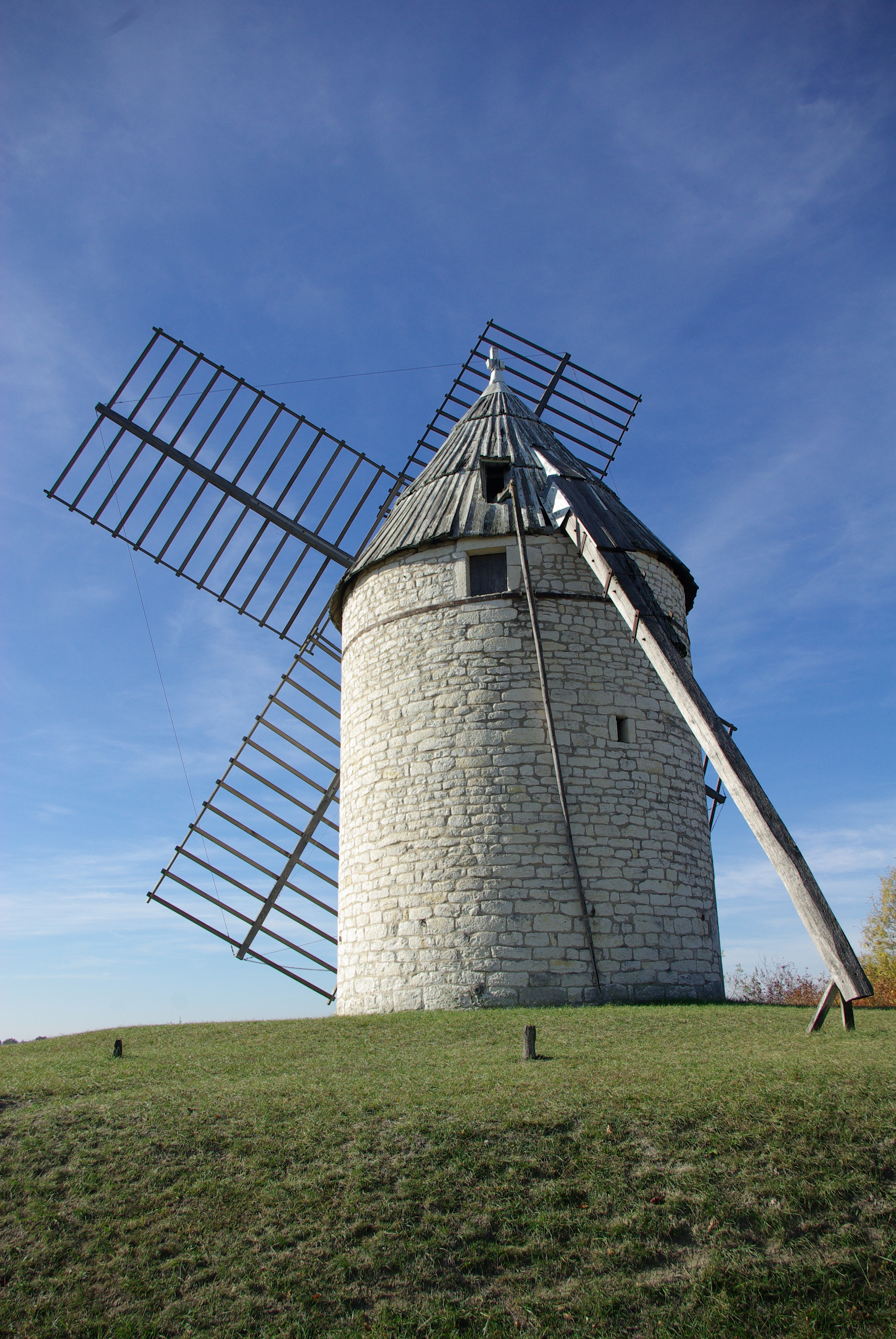
- Wind mill, Boisse
- Location of Sainte-Alauzie
- Location within France Location within Occitanie
- Coordinates: 44°18′51″N 1°18′57″E
- Country: France
- Region: Occitania
- Department: Lot
- Arrondissement: Cahors
- Canton: Marches du Sud-Quercy
- Commune: Castelnau-Montratier
- Area^{1}: 12.22 km^{2} (4.72 sq mi)
- Elevation: 400 m (1,300 ft)
- Highest elevation: 283 m (928 ft)
- Lowest elevation: 156 m (512 ft)
- Population (2022): 106
  - Density: 8.67/km^{2} (22.5/sq mi)
- Time zone: UTC+01:00 (CET)
  - Summer (DST): UTC+02:00 (CEST)
- Postal code: 46170
- ^{1} French Land Register data, which excludes lakes, ponds, glaciers > 1 km^{2} (0.386 sq mi or 247 acres) and river estuaries.

Sainte-Alauzie (French pronunciation: [sɛ̃t alozi]; Languedocien: Senta Alàusia) is a former commune in the Lot department in south-western France. On 1 January 2017, it was merged into the new commune Castelnau-Montratier-Sainte-Alauzie, which was renamed Castelnau-Montratier effective 2024. Its population was 106 in 2022.

== See also ==
- Communes of the Lot department
