= Pern, Lot =

Pern
- Part of Pern-Lhospitalet
- Location of Pern
- Location within France Location within Occitanie
- Coordinates: 44°19′47″N 1°24′18″E
- Country: France
- Region: Occitania
- Department: Lot
- Arrondissement: Cahors
- Canton: Marches du Sud-Quercy
- Commune: Pern-Lhospitalet
- Area^{1}: 25.66 km^{2} (9.91 sq mi)
- Elevation: 279 m (915 ft)
- Highest elevation: 325 m (1,066 ft)
- Lowest elevation: 198 m (650 ft)
- Population (2022): 426
  - Density: 16.6/km^{2} (43.0/sq mi)
- Time zone: UTC+01:00 (CET)
  - Summer (DST): UTC+02:00 (CEST)
- Postal code: 46170
- ^{1} French Land Register data, which excludes lakes, ponds, glaciers > 1 km^{2} (0.386 sq mi or 247 acres) and river estuaries.

Pern (French pronunciation: [pɛʁn]; Occitan: Pèrn) is a former commune in the Lot department in south-western France. On 1 January 2025, it was merged into the new commune of Pern-Lhospitalet.

== Geography ==
The Barguelonne has its source in the commune.

== See also ==
- Communes of the Lot department
