= Castelnau-Montratier (delegated commune) =

- Part of Castelnau-Montratier
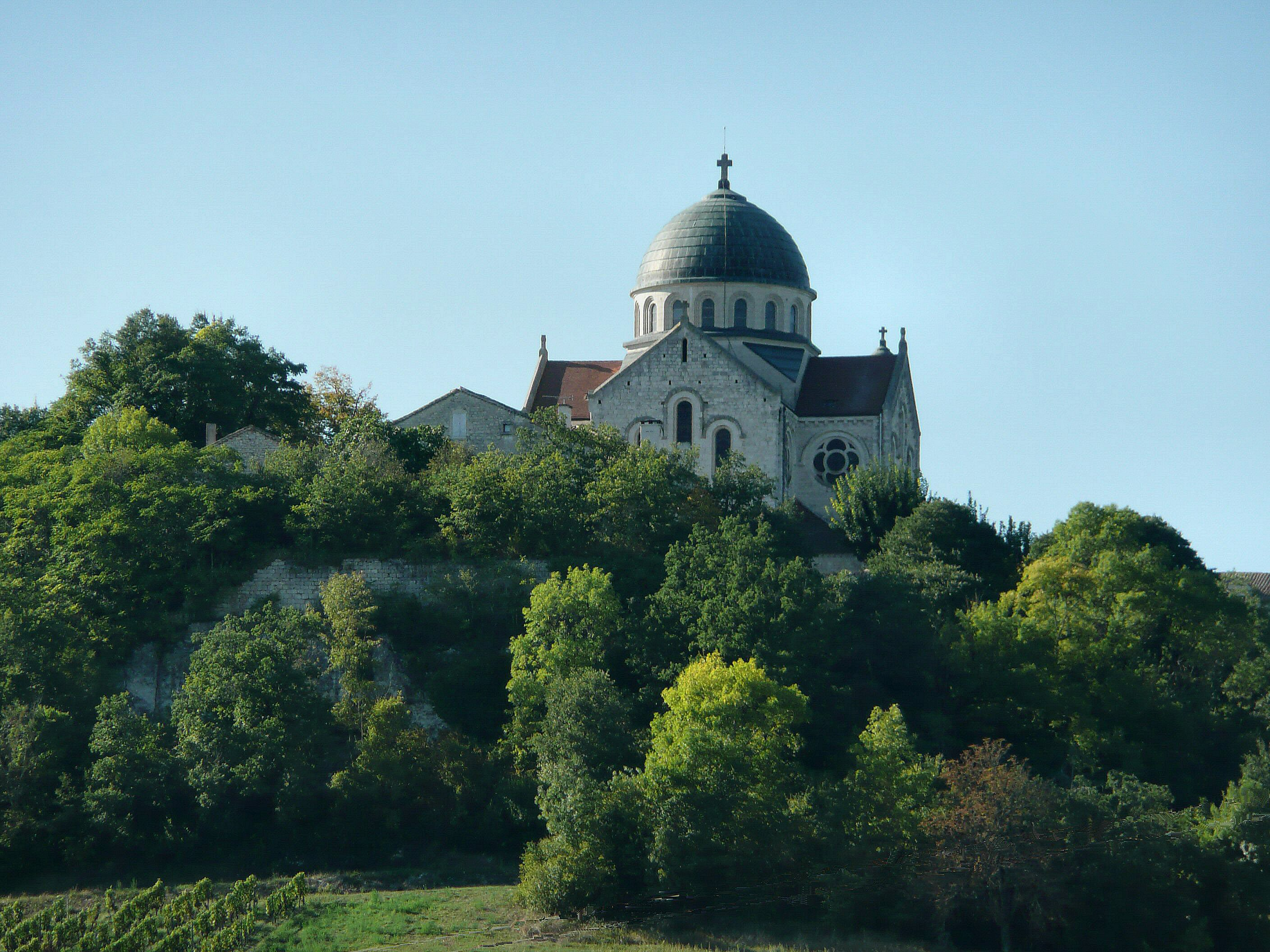
- The church of Saint-Martin, in Castelnau-Montratier

- Coat of arms
- Location of Castelnau-Montratier
- Location within France Location within Occitanie
- Coordinates: 44°16′11″N 1°21′14″E
- Country: France
- Region: Occitania
- Department: Lot
- Arrondissement: Cahors
- Canton: Marches du Sud-Quercy
- Commune: Castelnau-Montratier
- Area^{1}: 72.54 km^{2} (28.01 sq mi)
- Elevation: 248 m (814 ft)
- Highest elevation: 295 m (968 ft)
- Lowest elevation: 108 m (354 ft)
- Population (2022): 1,721
  - Density: 23.72/km^{2} (61.45/sq mi)
- Time zone: UTC+01:00 (CET)
  - Summer (DST): UTC+02:00 (CEST)
- Postal code: 46170
- ^{1} French Land Register data, which excludes lakes, ponds, glaciers > 1 km^{2} (0.386 sq mi or 247 acres) and river estuaries.

Castelnau-Montratier (French pronunciation: [kastɛlno mɔ̃ʁatje]; Languedocien: Castèlnau de Montratièr) is a former commune in the Lot department in south-western France. On 1 January 2017, it was merged into the new commune Castelnau-Montratier-Sainte-Alauzie, which was renamed Castelnau-Montratier effective 2024.

== Geography ==
The Barguelonne flows southwestward through the northern part of the commune.

== See also ==
- Communes of the Lot department
