= Jean-Claude Caron =

French actor (1944–2021)

- Born: 14 February 1944
- Died: 5 June 2021 (aged 77); Aujols, France
- Occupation: Actor

Jean-Claude Caron (14 February 1944 – 5 June 2021) was a French actor. He was best known for his role as Borelli in the series Navarro.

== Biography ==
Caron was born in 1944 and was a student of René Simon and Philippe Brigaud. In 1969, he joined the company of Jean-Louis Barrault and held roles in Rabelais and Jarry sur la butte at the Élysée Montmartre. From 1994 to 2005, he appeared in the series Navarro.

Jean-Claude Caron died in Aujols on 5 June 2021 at the age of 77.

== Filmography ==
- Manon Roland (1989)
- Le Pitre (1990)
- A Crime (1993)
- Navarro (1994–2005)
- Soleil (1997)
- Maître Da Costa (1997–1999)
- Potlatch (2010)
- Section de recherches (2012)
- Josephine, Guardian Angel (2013)
- Lalla Fadhma N'Soumer (2013)
