= Lhospitalet =

Commune in Lot, France

- Part of Pern-Lhospitalet
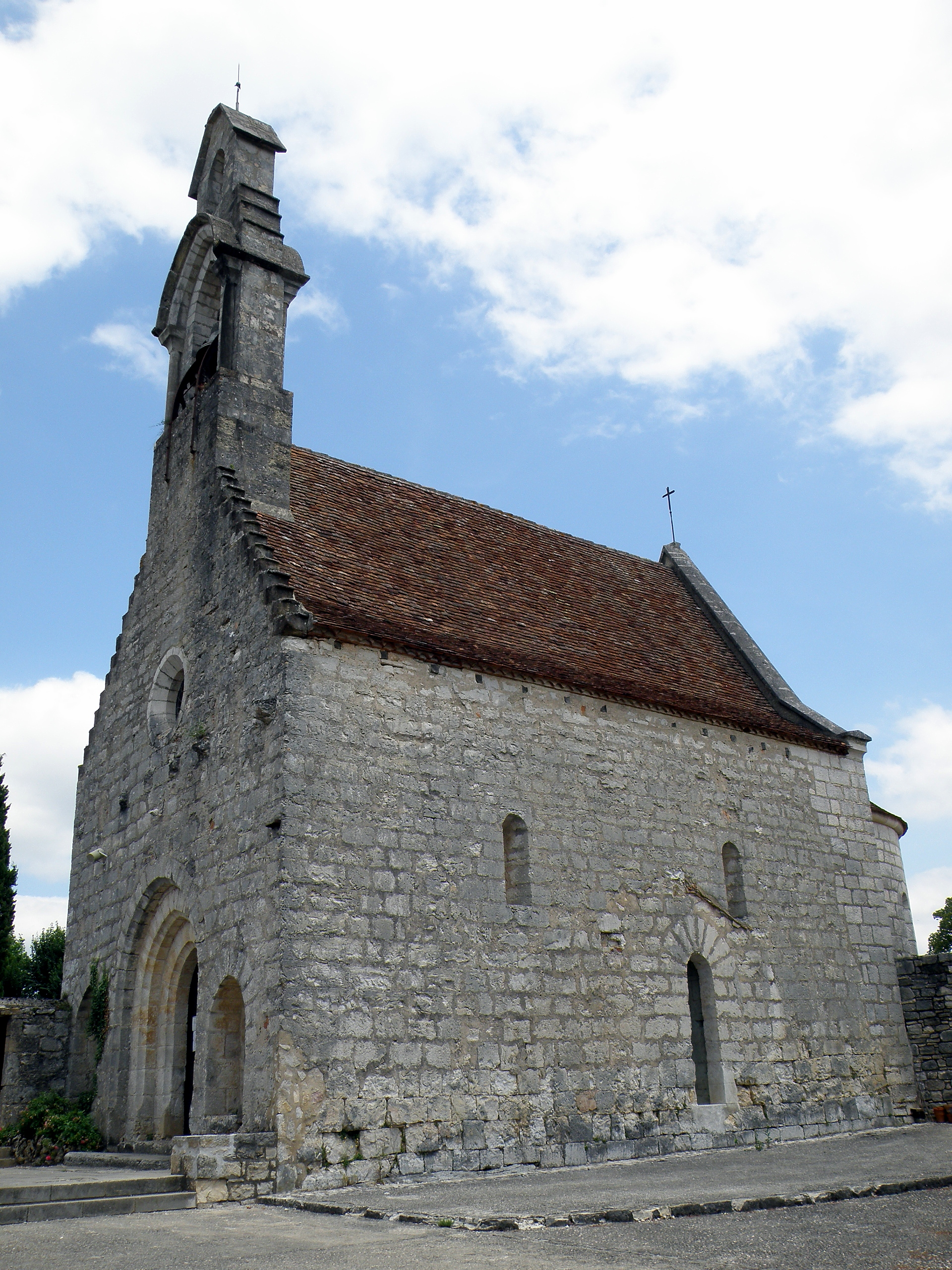
- The church in Lhospitalet
- Location of Lhospitalet
- Location within France Location within Occitanie
- Coordinates: 44°21′43″N 1°24′32″E
- Country: France
- Region: Occitania
- Department: Lot
- Arrondissement: Cahors
- Canton: Marches du Sud-Quercy
- Commune: Pern-Lhospitalet
- Area^{1}: 14.65 km^{2} (5.66 sq mi)
- Highest elevation: 330 m (1,080 ft)
- Lowest elevation: 217 m (712 ft)
- Population (2022): 499
  - Density: 34.1/km^{2} (88.2/sq mi)
- Time zone: UTC+01:00 (CET)
  - Summer (DST): UTC+02:00 (CEST)
- Postal code: 46170
- ^{1} French Land Register data, which excludes lakes, ponds, glaciers > 1 km^{2} (0.386 sq mi or 247 acres) and river estuaries.

Lhospitalet (French pronunciation: [lɔspitalɛ]; Occitan: L'Espitalet) is a former commune in the Lot department in south-western France. On 1 January 2025, it was merged into the new commune of Pern-Lhospitalet.

== Geography ==
The Barguelonne forms part of the commune's southern border.

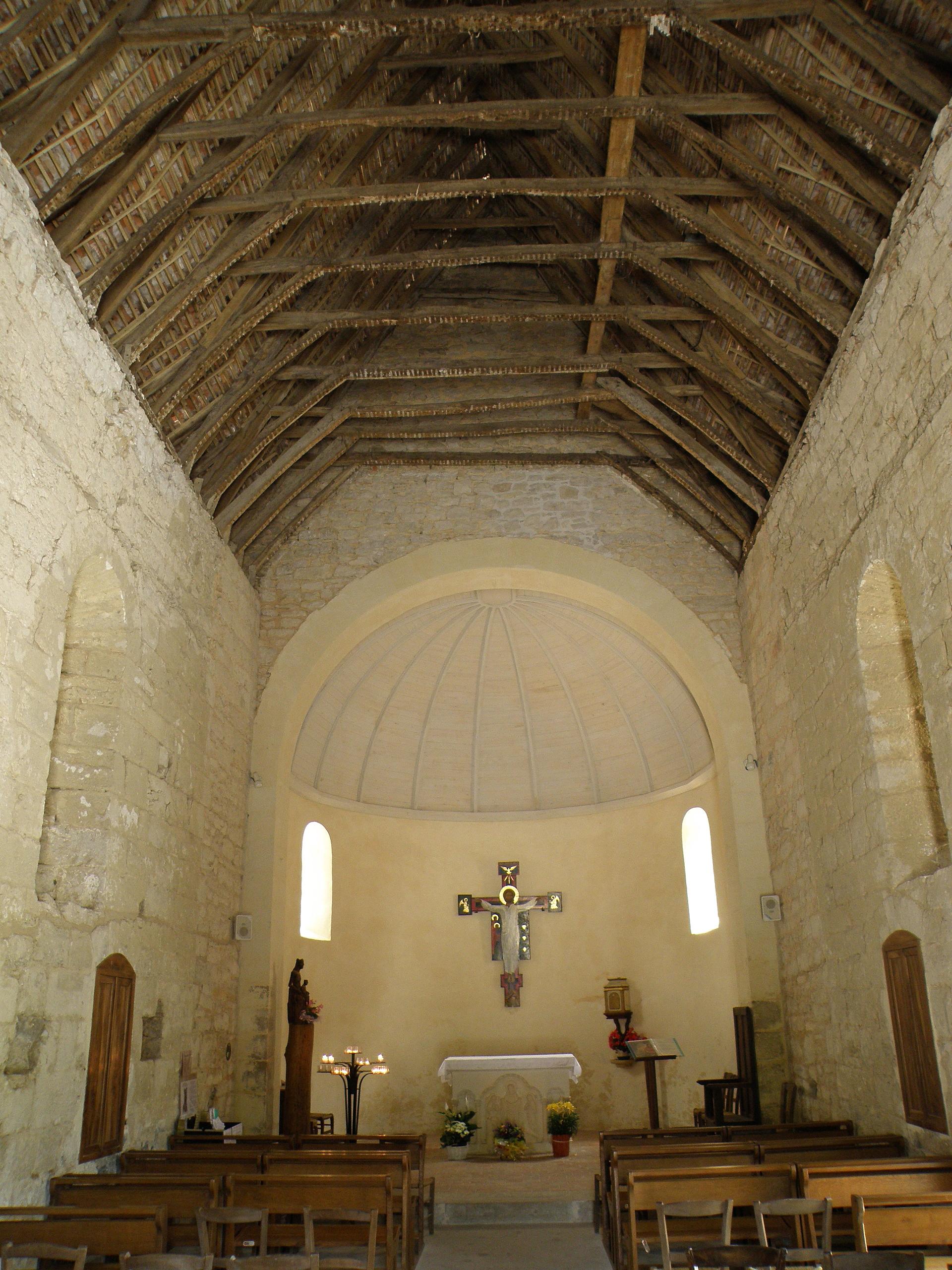
Church

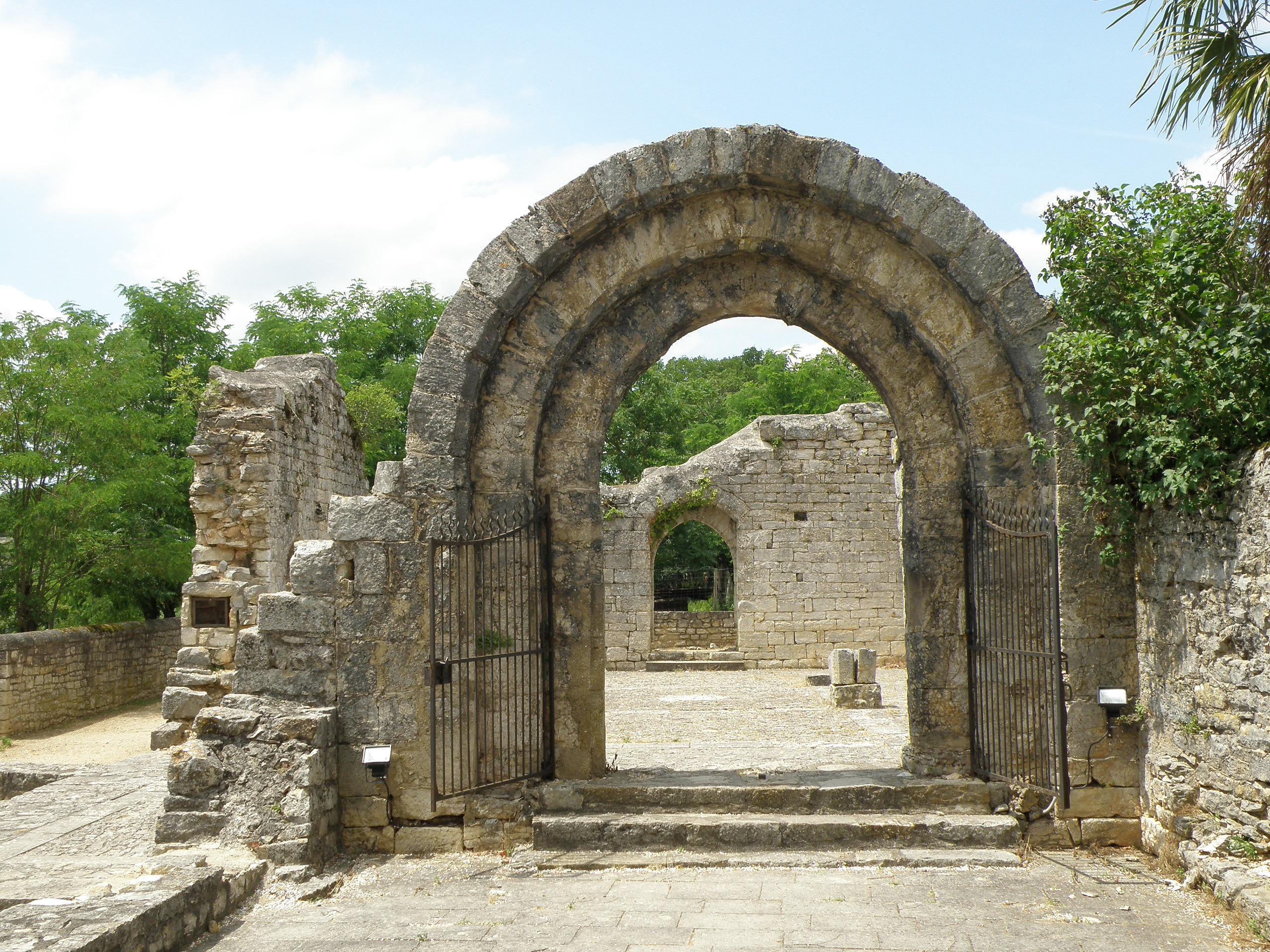
Ruins of the old Hospital

== See also ==
- Communes of the Lot department
