= Château de Castelnau-Montratier =

13th-century castle in Occitania, France

Coordinates: 44.2672°N 1.3539°E

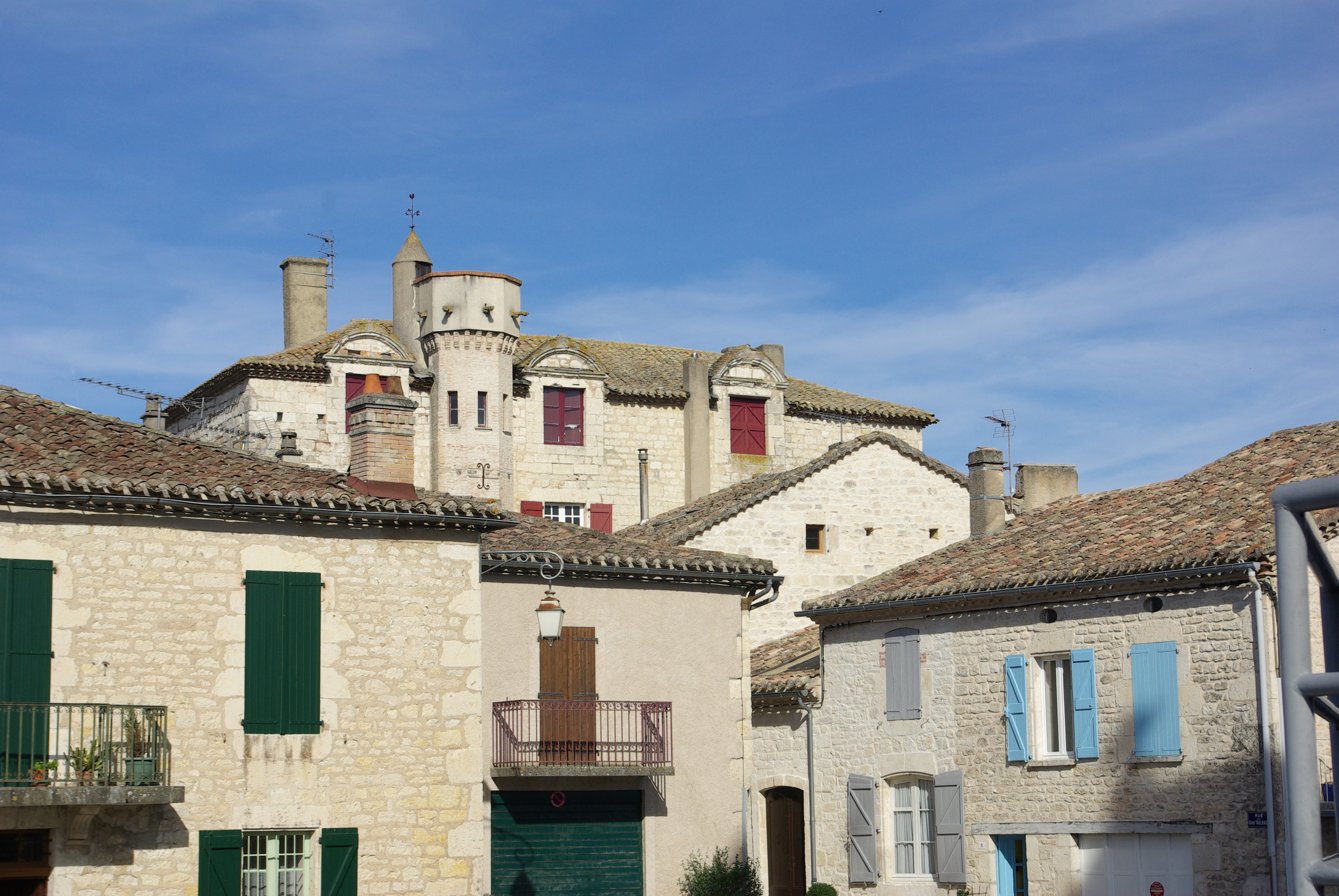

The Château de Castelnau-Montratier was originally a 13th-century castle in the commune of Castelnau-Montratier in the Lot département of France.

The château has 13th century façade, built in stone and in which are three double windows, each surmounted by an arch resting on a sculpted capital.

The castle is privately owned. It has been listed since 1924 as a monument historique by the French Ministry of Culture.

== See also ==
- List of castles in France
