= L'Hospitalet =

L'Hospitalet may refer to:

== France ==
- L'Hospitalet, Alpes-de-Haute-Provence
- L'Hospitalet-près-l'Andorre, in Ariège
- L'Hospitalet-du-Larzac, in Aveyron
- Lhospitalet, in Lot

== Spain ==
- L'Hospitalet de Llobregat (commonly known as L'Hospitalet), a municipality and city in Catalonia
  - CE L'Hospitalet, football team based in L'Hospitalet de Llobregat
  - L'Hospitalet Pioners, American football team based in L'Hospitalet de Llobregat
  - L'Hospitalet de Llobregat Baseball Stadium
  - RC L'Hospitalet, a rugby union team in L'Hospitalet de Llobregat
  - Transport in L'Hospitalet de Llobregat, operated by several companies, most of which are part of the Autoritat del Transport Metropolità, a transport authority managing services in the metropolitan area of Barcelona
- Vandellòs i l'Hospitalet de l'Infant, a municipality in Catalonia
  - L'Hospitalet de l'Infant, a village in Catalonia
