= Château de Couanac =

Castle in the Lot département of France

Coordinates: 44.3761°N 1.7004°E

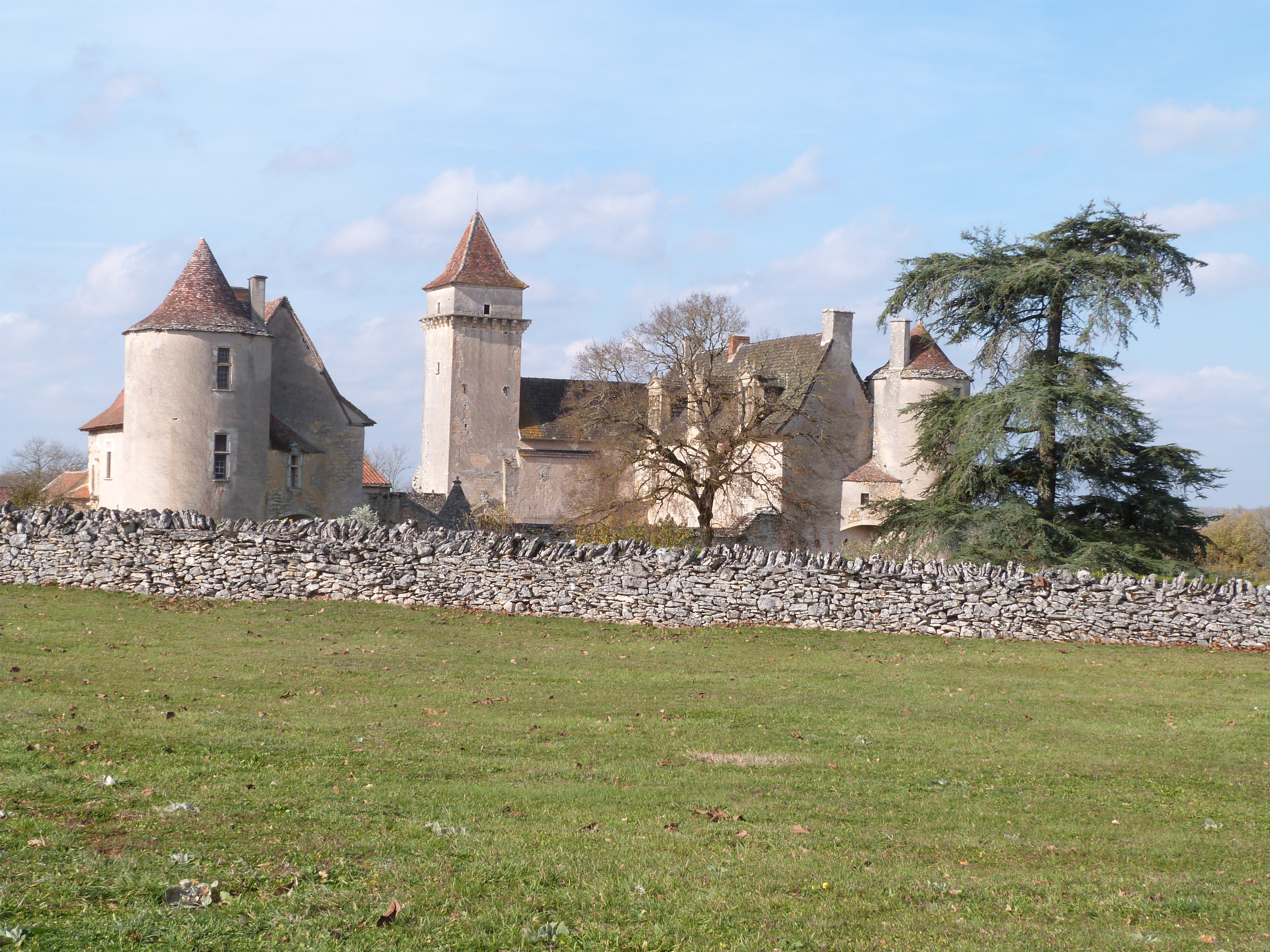
General view of Couanac castle

The Château de Couanac is a castle in the commune of Varaire in the Lot département of France.

It was built in the 16th century by the powerful family of Hébrard de Saint-Sulpice, incorporating part of an earlier Romanesque church dedicated to Saint George.

The castle is composed of two corps de logis. The main logis is flanked by two towers, one round and the other square with machicolations at the top. At the bottom of the tower is the doorway to the chapel, situated partly under the tower, which has kept its Romanesque transept. Originally, the church's apse was in the east. The columns of the triumphal arch are based in the crypt and are surmounted by sculpted Romanesque capitals. The bodies of former owners are interred in the crypt. The Renaissance south façade has several mullioned windows and dormers surmounted with pediments. Several rooms still have plafonds à la française (French-style ceilings: joists the same width as the spaces between them; see Plafond à la française in French Wikipedia).

The second range of buildings, known as Château Bouscary, is to the south and has a round tower. In the courtyard, the entrance gateway is composed of segments of a circle, with sculptured framing in the form of a lopped tree. Following restoration, the Gothic arch at the entrance to the enceinte was transformed to the shape of a basket handle. In the castle's courtyard is a well partly dug into the rock and covered with a conical roof.

The Château de Couanac is private property and is open to the public. It has been listed since 1974 as a monument historique by the French Ministry of Culture.

== See also ==
- List of castles in France
