= Château de Labastide =

Castle in Occitania, France

Coordinates: 44.3441°N 1.7837°E

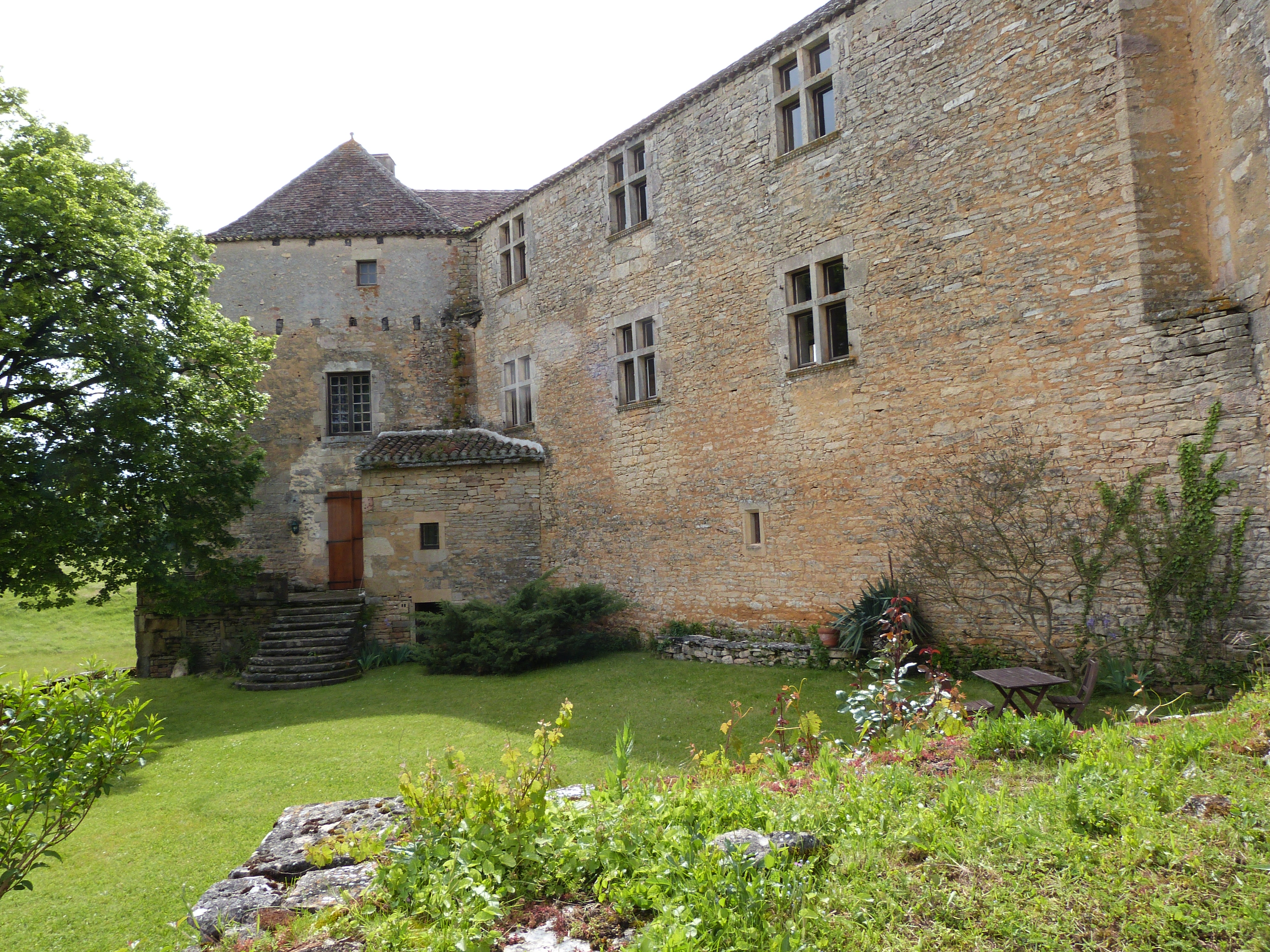
Facade of the castle of Marsa

The Château de Labastide, also known as the Château de Marsa, is a castle in the commune of Beauregard in the Lot département of France.

Construction dates from the 13th, 15th and 17th centuries. The Château de Labastide is made up of a main building with two wings forming, with the central building, obtuse angles. The ordered and rectangular plan suggests that the whole edifice dates from the 17th century. Certain parts, however, are older. The square tower which flanks the building to the north east dates from the 13th century. The south east gateway has traces of machicolations which date from the 15th century. Internally, little remains of the original decor. The first floor of the central part is a single room of vast proportions which still has traces of frescoes, a stone floor as well as a plafond à la française (French-style ceiling: joists the same width as the spaces between them; see Plafond à la française in French Wikipedia).

The castle is privately owned. It has been listed since 1979 as a monument historique by the French Ministry of Culture.

== See also ==
- List of castles in France
