= Laburgade =

- Commune
- Location of Laburgade
- Location within France Location within Occitanie
- Coordinates: 44°23′14″N 1°32′31″E
- Country: France
- Region: Occitania
- Department: Lot
- Arrondissement: Cahors
- Canton: Marches du Sud-Quercy
- Intercommunality: Pays de Lalbenque-Limogne

Government
  - Mayor (2020–2026): Jean-Claude Sauvier
- Area^{1}: 12.57 km^{2} (4.85 sq mi)
- Highest elevation: 278 m (912 ft)
- Lowest elevation: 159 m (522 ft)
- Population (2023): 379
  - Density: 30.2/km^{2} (78.1/sq mi)
- Time zone: UTC+01:00 (CET)
  - Summer (DST): UTC+02:00 (CEST)
- INSEE/Postal code: 46140 /46230
- ^{1} French Land Register data, which excludes lakes, ponds, glaciers > 1 km^{2} (0.386 sq mi or 247 acres) and river estuaries.

Laburgade (French pronunciation: [labyʁɡad]; Occitan: La Burgada) is a commune in the Lot department in south-western France.

== See also ==
- Communes of the Lot department
