= Lugagnac =

- Commune
- Location of Lugagnac
- Location within France Location within Occitanie
- Coordinates: 44°24′34″N 1°44′12″E
- Country: France
- Region: Occitania
- Department: Lot
- Arrondissement: Cahors
- Canton: Marches du Sud-Quercy
- Intercommunality: Pays de Lalbenque-Limogne

Government
  - Mayor (2020–2026): François Reymann
- Area^{1}: 15.81 km^{2} (6.10 sq mi)
- Elevation: 330 m (1,080 ft)
- Highest elevation: 339 m (1,112 ft)
- Lowest elevation: 173 m (568 ft)
- Population (2023): 140
  - Density: 8.9/km^{2} (23/sq mi)
- Time zone: UTC+01:00 (CET)
  - Summer (DST): UTC+02:00 (CEST)
- INSEE/Postal code: 46179 /46260
- ^{1} French Land Register data, which excludes lakes, ponds, glaciers > 1 km^{2} (0.386 sq mi or 247 acres) and river estuaries.

Lugagnac (French pronunciation: [lyɡaɲak]; Occitan: Luganhac) is a commune in south-western France. Lugagnac is situated in the Lot department, Occitanie region 24 kilometres from Cahors, the department capital. The commune is 497 kilometres from Paris, France.

Popular places to visit nearby include Saint-Cirq-Lapopie at 8 km and Cajarc at 12 km.

== See also ==
- Communes of the Lot department
