= Bach, Lot =

Bach
- Commune
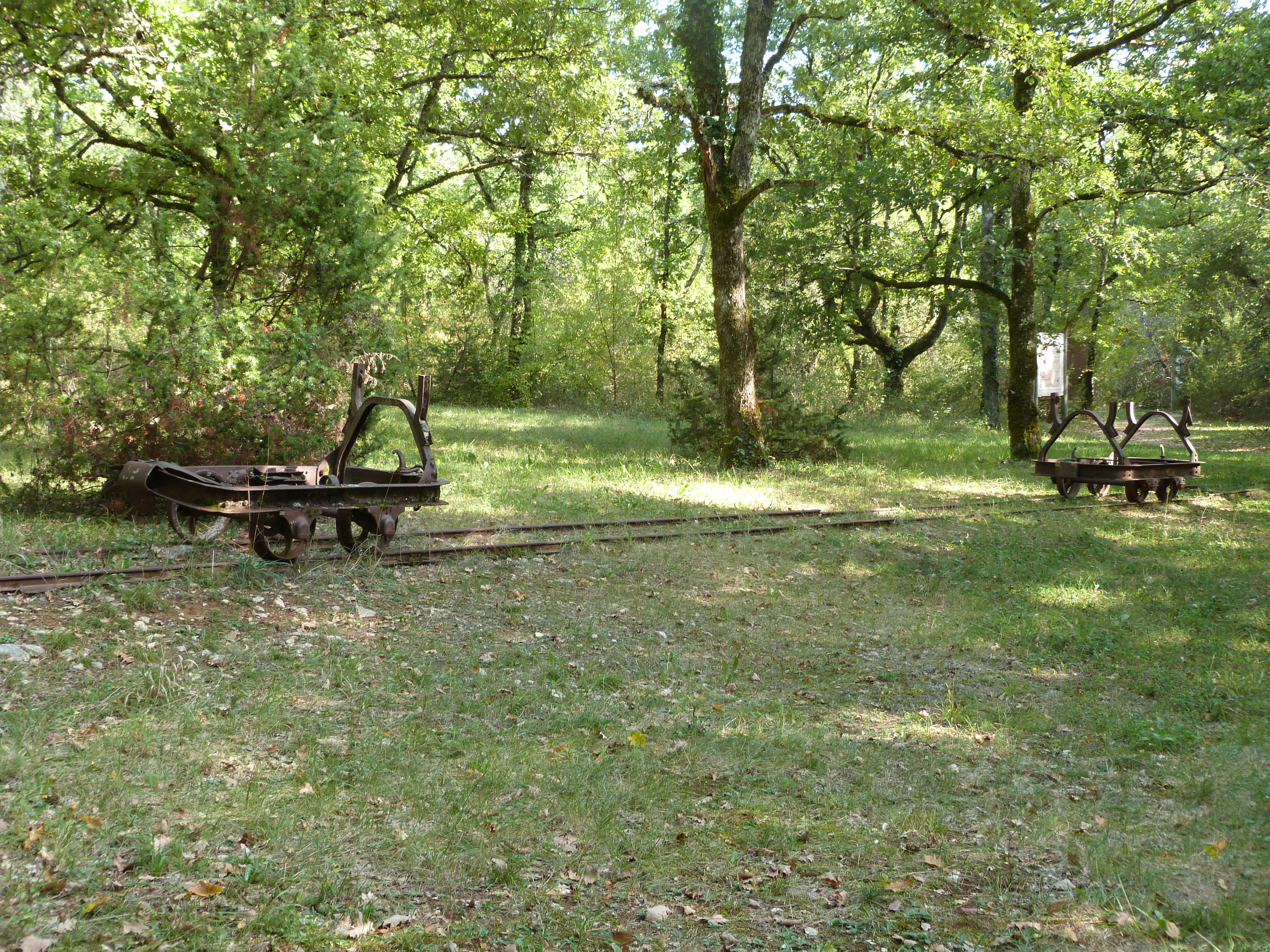
- Phosphate mine railway wagons
- Location of Bach
- Location within France Location within Occitanie
- Coordinates: 44°21′05″N 1°40′20″E
- Country: France
- Region: Occitania
- Department: Lot
- Arrondissement: Cahors
- Canton: Marches du Sud-Quercy
- Intercommunality: Pays de Lalbenque-Limogne

Government
  - Mayor (2020–2026): Patrick Valette
- Area^{1}: 21.02 km^{2} (8.12 sq mi)
- Highest elevation: 337 m (1,106 ft)
- Lowest elevation: 220 m (720 ft)
- Population (2023): 211
  - Density: 10.0/km^{2} (26.0/sq mi)
- Time zone: UTC+01:00 (CET)
  - Summer (DST): UTC+02:00 (CEST)
- INSEE/Postal code: 46013 /46230
- ^{1} French Land Register data, which excludes lakes, ponds, glaciers > 1 km^{2} (0.386 sq mi or 247 acres) and river estuaries.

Bach is a commune in the Lot department in southwestern France.

The phosphate mines of Cloup d'Aural (French: Phosphatière du Cloup d'Aural) are located here.

== Population ==
Historical population
Year	Pop.	±% p.a.
1968	144	—
1975	127	−1.78%
1982	124	−0.34%
1990	140	+1.53%
1999	144	+0.31%
2007	171	+2.17%
2012	165	−0.71%
2017	178	+1.53%
2023	211	+2.88%
Source: INSEE

== See also ==
- Communes of the Lot department
