= Saillac, Lot =

Saillac
- Commune
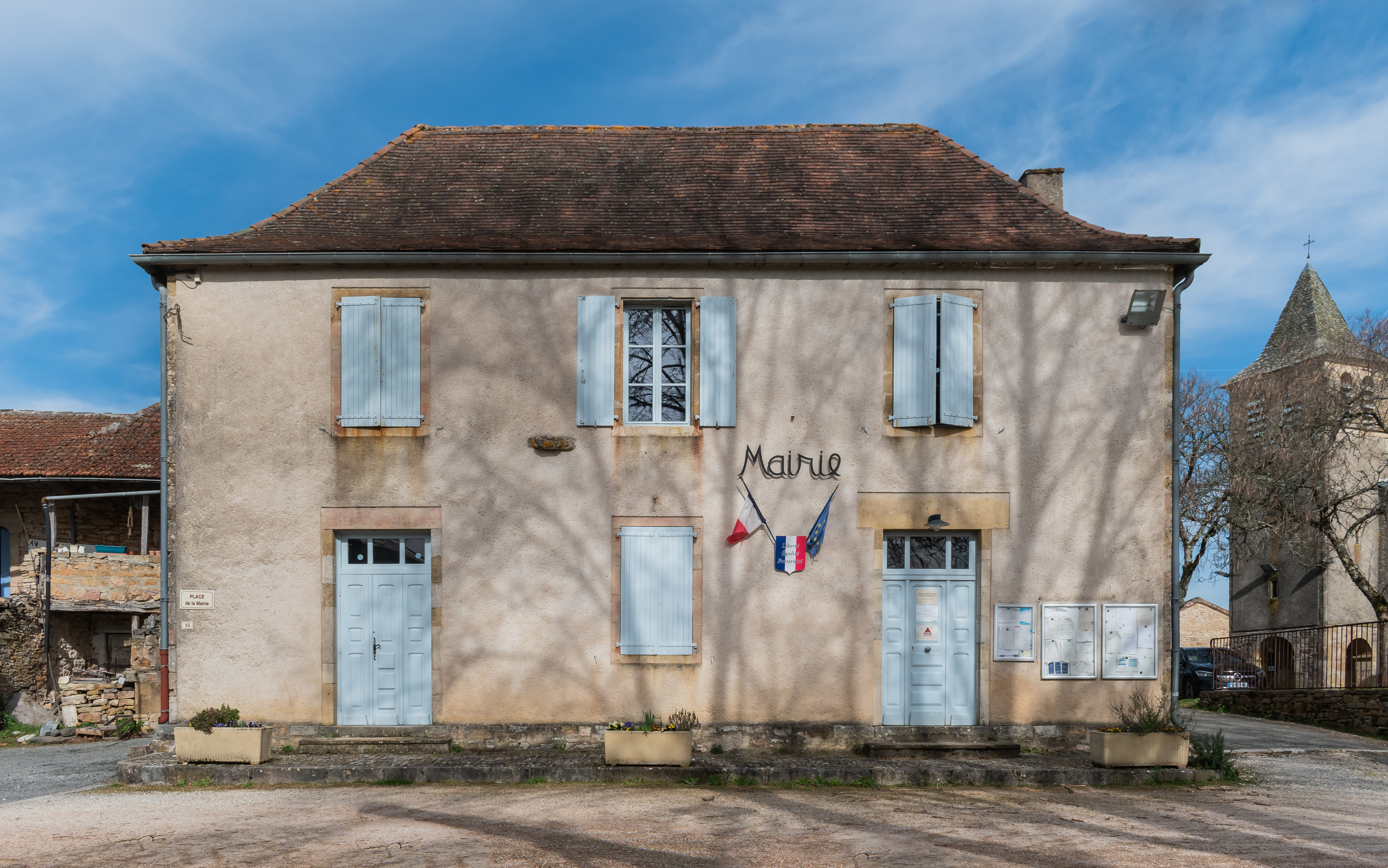
- Town hall of Saillac
- Location of Saillac
- Location within France Location within Occitanie
- Coordinates: 44°19′56″N 1°45′39″E
- Country: France
- Region: Occitania
- Department: Lot
- Arrondissement: Cahors
- Canton: Marches du Sud-Quercy
- Intercommunality: Pays de Lalbenque-Limogne

Government
  - Mayor (2020–2026): Micheline Dubois
- Area^{1}: 16.28 km^{2} (6.29 sq mi)
- Elevation: 360 m (1,180 ft)
- Highest elevation: 400 m (1,300 ft)
- Lowest elevation: 258 m (846 ft)
- Population (2023): 148
  - Density: 9.09/km^{2} (23.5/sq mi)
- Time zone: UTC+01:00 (CET)
  - Summer (DST): UTC+02:00 (CEST)
- INSEE/Postal code: 46247 /46260
- ^{1} French Land Register data, which excludes lakes, ponds, glaciers > 1 km^{2} (0.386 sq mi or 247 acres) and river estuaries.

Saillac (French pronunciation: [sajak]; Occitan: Salhac) is a commune in the Lot department in south-western France.

== See also ==
- Communes of the Lot department
