= Lalbenque =

- Commune
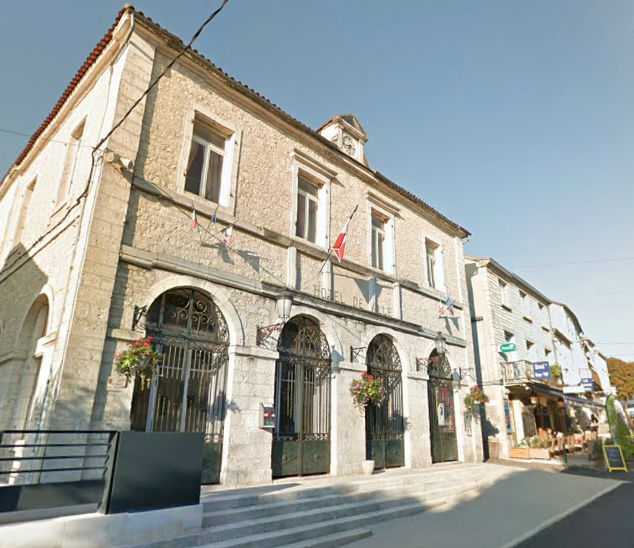
- The town hall in Lalbenque
- Location of Lalbenque
- Location within France Location within Occitanie
- Coordinates: 44°20′22″N 1°32′44″E
- Country: France
- Region: Occitania
- Department: Lot
- Arrondissement: Cahors
- Canton: Marches du Sud-Quercy

Government
  - Mayor (2020–2026): Liliane Lugol
- Area^{1}: 52.24 km^{2} (20.17 sq mi)
- Elevation: 239 m (784 ft)
- Highest elevation: 332 m (1,089 ft)
- Lowest elevation: 197 m (646 ft)
- Population (2023): 1,899
  - Density: 36.35/km^{2} (94.15/sq mi)
- Time zone: UTC+01:00 (CET)
  - Summer (DST): UTC+02:00 (CEST)
- INSEE/Postal code: 46148 /46230
- ^{1} French Land Register data, which excludes lakes, ponds, glaciers > 1 km^{2} (0.386 sq mi or 247 acres) and river estuaries.

Lalbenque (French pronunciation: [lalbɛ̃k]; Occitan: L'Albenca) is a commune in the Lot department in south-western France.

== See also ==
- Communes of the Lot department
