= Escamps, Lot =

Escamps
- Commune
- Location of Escamps
- Location within France Location within Occitanie
- Coordinates: 44°22′04″N 1°38′05″E
- Country: France
- Region: Occitania
- Department: Lot
- Arrondissement: Cahors
- Canton: Marches du Sud-Quercy
- Intercommunality: Pays de Lalbenque-Limogne

Government
  - Mayor (2020–2026): Annie Walle
- Area^{1}: 12.11 km^{2} (4.68 sq mi)
- Highest elevation: 302 m (991 ft)
- Lowest elevation: 235 m (771 ft)
- Population (2023): 206
  - Density: 17.0/km^{2} (44.1/sq mi)
- Demonym: Escampsois et Escampsoises
- Time zone: UTC+01:00 (CET)
  - Summer (DST): UTC+02:00 (CEST)
- INSEE/Postal code: 46091 /46230
- ^{1} French Land Register data, which excludes lakes, ponds, glaciers > 1 km^{2} (0.386 sq mi or 247 acres) and river estuaries.

Escamps (French pronunciation: [ɛskɑ̃]) is a commune in the Lot department in south-western France.

== See also ==
- Communes of the Lot department
