= Promilhanes =

- Commune
- Location of Promilhanes
- Location within France Location within Occitanie
- Coordinates: 44°22′36″N 1°48′59″E
- Country: France
- Region: Occitania
- Department: Lot
- Arrondissement: Cahors
- Canton: Marches du Sud-Quercy

Government
  - Mayor (2025–2026): Jean-Marc Colon
- Area^{1}: 14.55 km^{2} (5.62 sq mi)
- Elevation: 390 m (1,280 ft)
- Highest elevation: 403 m (1,322 ft)
- Lowest elevation: 334 m (1,096 ft)
- Population (2023): 227
  - Density: 15.6/km^{2} (40.4/sq mi)
- Time zone: UTC+01:00 (CET)
  - Summer (DST): UTC+02:00 (CEST)
- INSEE/Postal code: 46227 /46260
- ^{1} French Land Register data, which excludes lakes, ponds, glaciers > 1 km^{2} (0.386 sq mi or 247 acres) and river estuaries.

Promilhanes (French pronunciation: [pʁɔmijan]; Occitan: Promilhanas) is a commune in the Lot department in south-western France.

== See also ==
- Communes of the Lot department
