= Limogne-en-Quercy =

- Commune
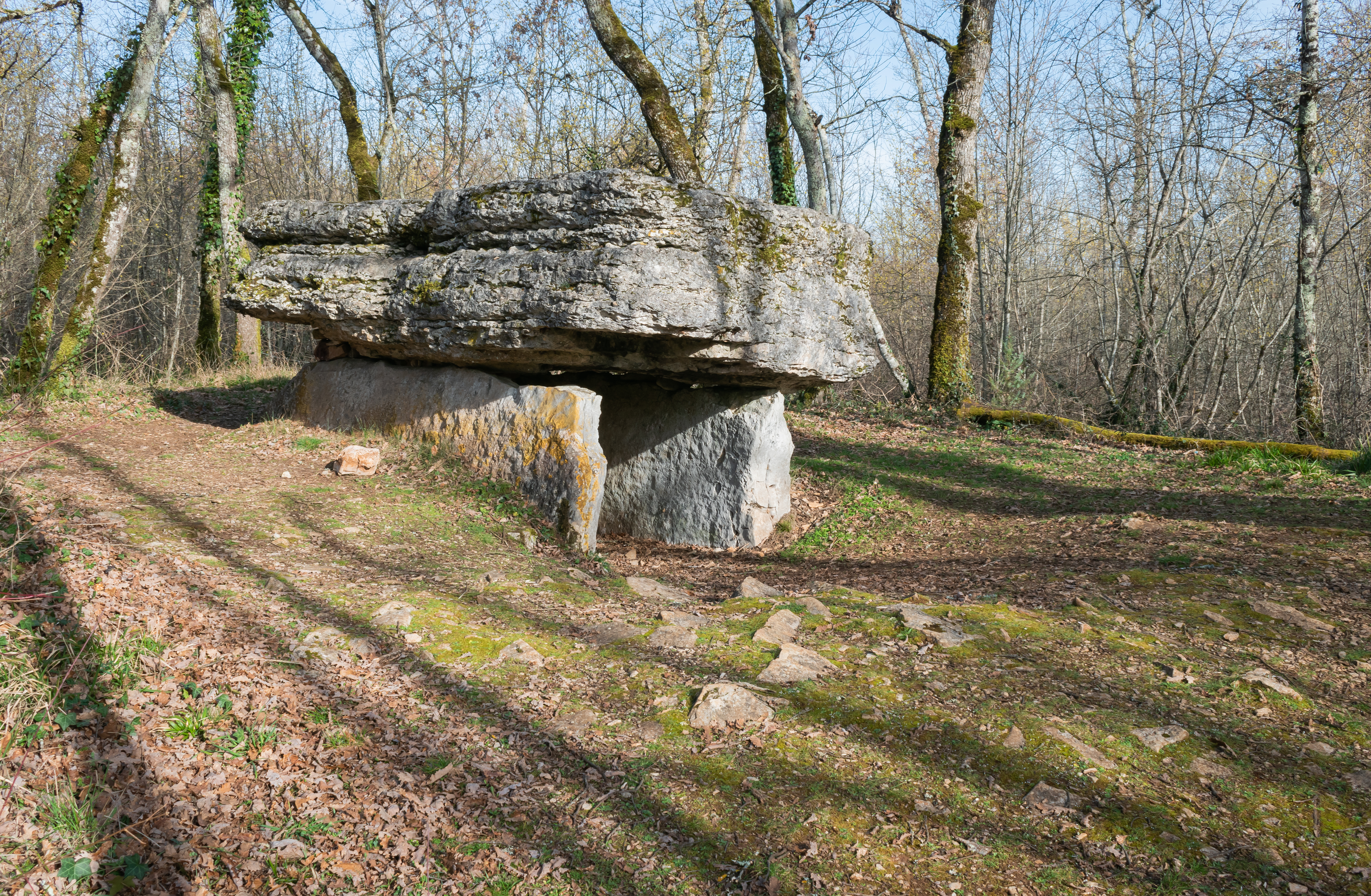
- The Dolmen of the Aurie Lake known as "Pech Lapeyre" in Limogne-en-Quercy

- Coat of arms
- Location of Limogne-en-Quercy
- Location within France Location within Occitanie
- Coordinates: 44°23′54″N 1°46′16″E
- Country: France
- Region: Occitania
- Department: Lot
- Arrondissement: Cahors
- Canton: Marches du Sud-Quercy

Government
  - Mayor (2021–2026): Jean-Claude Vialette
- Area^{1}: 32.31 km^{2} (12.47 sq mi)
- Highest elevation: 403 m (1,322 ft)
- Lowest elevation: 214 m (702 ft)
- Population (2023): 856
  - Density: 26.5/km^{2} (68.6/sq mi)
- Time zone: UTC+01:00 (CET)
  - Summer (DST): UTC+02:00 (CEST)
- INSEE/Postal code: 46173 /46260
- ^{1} French Land Register data, which excludes lakes, ponds, glaciers > 1 km^{2} (0.386 sq mi or 247 acres) and river estuaries.

Limogne-en-Quercy (French pronunciation: [limɔɲ ɑ̃ kɛʁsi], literally Limogne in Quercy; Occitan: Limonha de Carcin) is a commune in the Lot department in south-western France.

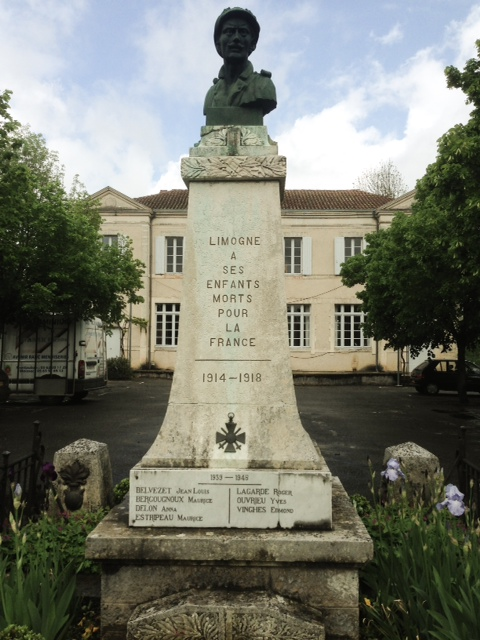
Monument to those from the commune who died in World War I and World War II

== See also ==
- Communes of the Lot department
