= Trespoux-Rassiels =

- Commune
- Location of Trespoux-Rassiels
- Location within France Location within Occitanie
- Coordinates: 44°24′50″N 1°22′43″E
- Country: France
- Region: Occitania
- Department: Lot
- Arrondissement: Cahors
- Canton: Cahors-3
- Intercommunality: CA Grand Cahors

Government
  - Mayor (2020–2026): Pascal Lavaur
- Area^{1}: 20.70 km^{2} (7.99 sq mi)
- Elevation: 296 m (971 ft)
- Highest elevation: 343 m (1,125 ft)
- Lowest elevation: 132 m (433 ft)
- Population (2023): 845
  - Density: 40.8/km^{2} (106/sq mi)
- Time zone: UTC+01:00 (CET)
  - Summer (DST): UTC+02:00 (CEST)
- INSEE/Postal code: 46322 /46090
- ^{1} French Land Register data, which excludes lakes, ponds, glaciers > 1 km^{2} (0.386 sq mi or 247 acres) and river estuaries.

Trespoux-Rassiels (French pronunciation: [tʁɛspu ʁasjɛl]; Occitan: Trespotz) is a commune in the Lot department in south-western France.

== See also ==
- Communes of the Lot department
