= Concots =

- Commune
- Location of Concots
- Location within France Location within Occitanie
- Coordinates: 44°24′09″N 1°38′42″E
- Country: France
- Region: Occitania
- Department: Lot
- Arrondissement: Cahors
- Canton: Marches du Sud-Quercy
- Intercommunality: Pays de Lalbenque-Limogne

Government
  - Mayor (2020–2026): Jean-Marie Aillet
- Area^{1}: 26.02 km^{2} (10.05 sq mi)
- Elevation: 283 m (928 ft)
- Highest elevation: 368 m (1,207 ft)
- Lowest elevation: 195 m (640 ft)
- Population (2023): 420
  - Density: 16/km^{2} (42/sq mi)
- Time zone: UTC+01:00 (CET)
  - Summer (DST): UTC+02:00 (CEST)
- INSEE/Postal code: 46073 /46260
- ^{1} French Land Register data, which excludes lakes, ponds, glaciers > 1 km^{2} (0.386 sq mi or 247 acres) and river estuaries.

Concots is a commune in the Lot department in south-western France.

== See also ==
- Communes of the Lot department
