= Saint-Paul-Flaugnac =

- Commune
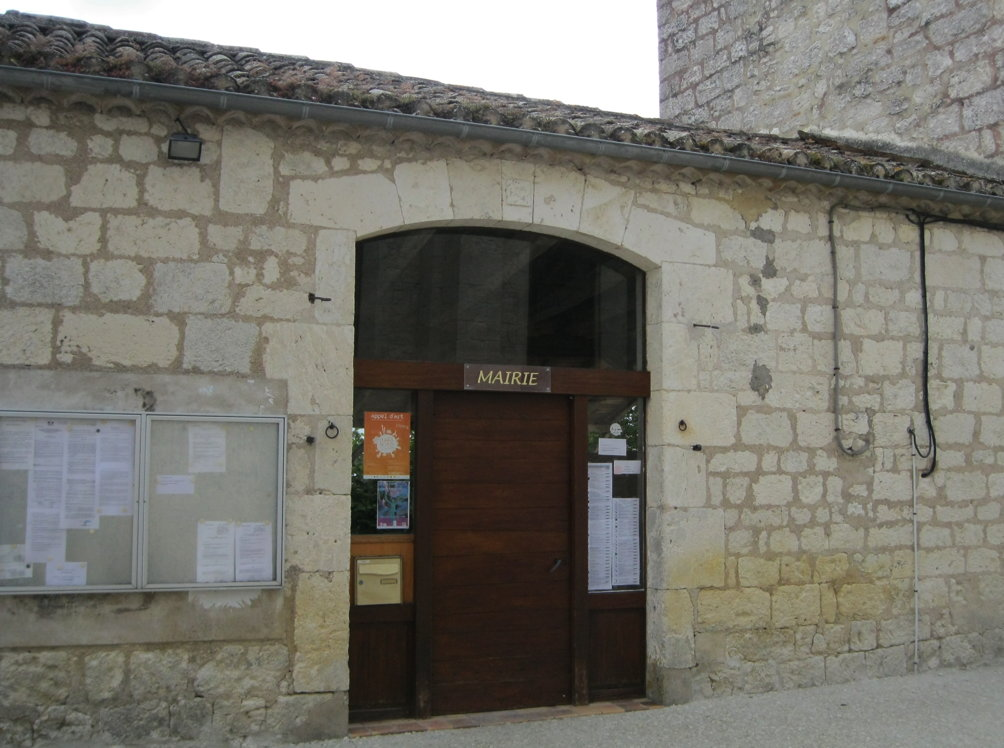
- The town hall of Flaugnac
- Location of Saint-Paul-Flaugnac
- Location within France Location within Occitanie
- Coordinates: 44°16′44″N 1°23′35″E
- Country: France
- Region: Occitania
- Department: Lot
- Arrondissement: Cahors
- Canton: Marches du Sud-Quercy
- Area^{1}: 51.15 km^{2} (19.75 sq mi)
- Population (2023): 996
  - Density: 19.5/km^{2} (50.4/sq mi)
- Time zone: UTC+01:00 (CET)
  - Summer (DST): UTC+02:00 (CEST)
- INSEE/Postal code: 46103 /46170
- ^{1} French Land Register data, which excludes lakes, ponds, glaciers > 1 km^{2} (0.386 sq mi or 247 acres) and river estuaries.

Saint-Paul-Flaugnac is a commune in the department of Lot, southern France. The municipality was established on 1 January 2016 by merger of the former communes of Flaugnac and Saint-Paul-de-Loubressac.

== See also ==
- Communes of the Lot department
