= Canton of Cahors-3 =

Coordinates: 44.44°N 1.44°E

The canton of Cahors-3 is an administrative division of the Lot department, southern France. It was created at the French canton reorganisation which came into effect in March 2015. Its seat is in Cahors.

It consists of the following communes:

1. Cahors (partly)
2. Cieurac
3. Flaujac-Poujols
4. Labastide-Marnhac
5. Le Montat
6. Trespoux-Rassiels
