= Cieurac =

- Commune
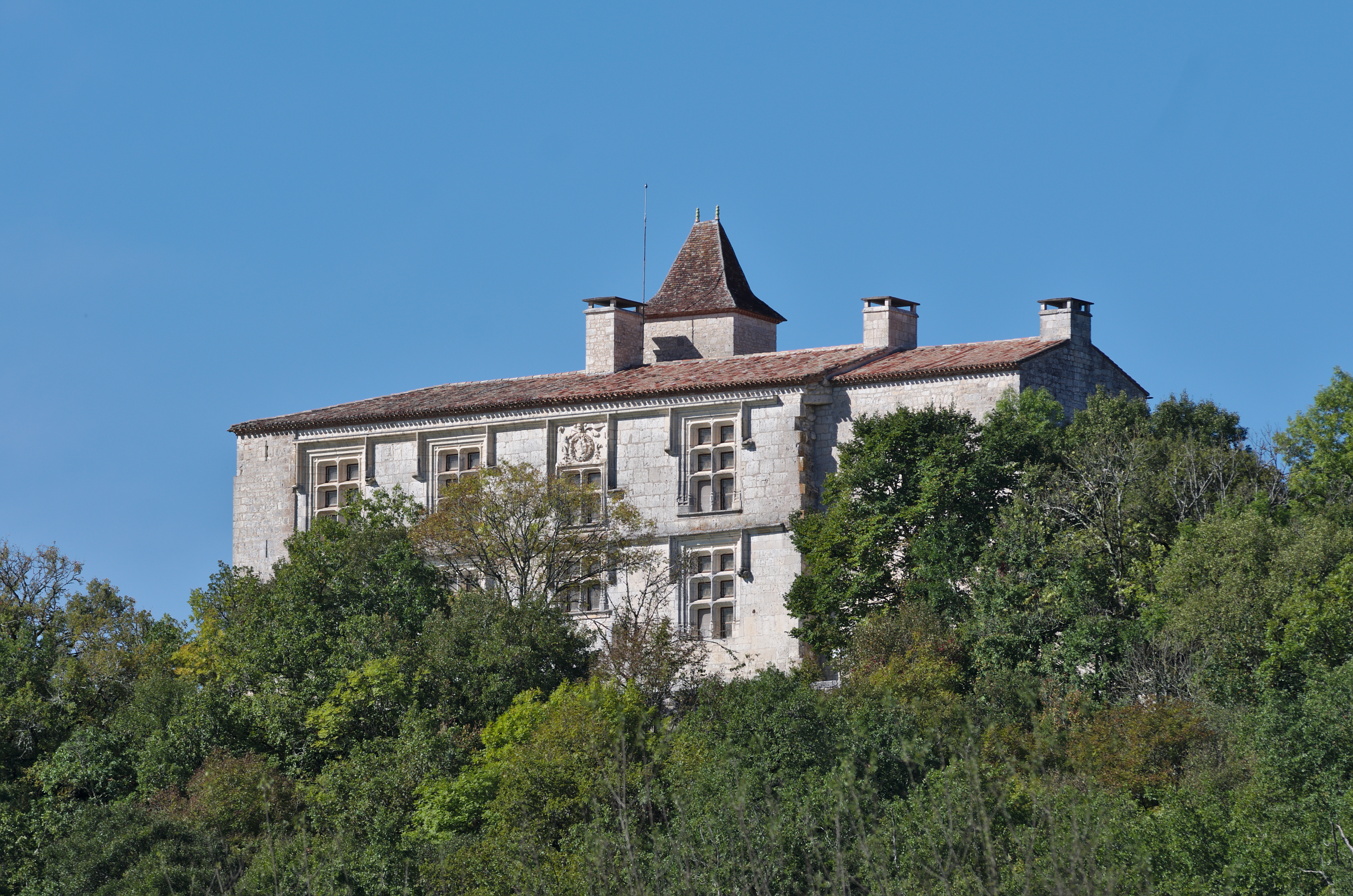
- The chateau in Cieurac
- Location of Cieurac
- Location within France Location within Occitanie
- Coordinates: 44°22′07″N 1°30′32″E
- Country: France
- Region: Occitania
- Department: Lot
- Arrondissement: Cahors
- Canton: Cahors-3
- Intercommunality: CA Grand Cahors

Government
  - Mayor (2020–2026): Guy Peyrus
- Area^{1}: 18.7 km^{2} (7.2 sq mi)
- Highest elevation: 292 m (958 ft)
- Lowest elevation: 189 m (620 ft)
- Population (2023): 660
  - Density: 35/km^{2} (91/sq mi)
- Time zone: UTC+01:00 (CET)
  - Summer (DST): UTC+02:00 (CEST)
- INSEE/Postal code: 46070 /46230
- ^{1} French Land Register data, which excludes lakes, ponds, glaciers > 1 km^{2} (0.386 sq mi or 247 acres) and river estuaries.

Cieurac (French pronunciation: [sjœʁak]; Occitan: Siurac) is a commune in the Lot department in south-western France.

== See also ==
- Communes of the Lot department
