= Belmont-Sainte-Foi =

- Commune
- Location of Belmont-Sainte-Foi
- Location within France Location within Occitanie
- Coordinates: 44°17′00″N 1°38′39″E
- Country: France
- Region: Occitania
- Department: Lot
- Arrondissement: Cahors
- Canton: Marches du Sud-Quercy
- Intercommunality: Pays de Lalbenque-Limogne

Government
  - Mayor (2020–2026): Sylviane Tison
- Area^{1}: 9.01 km^{2} (3.48 sq mi)
- Elevation: 268 m (879 ft)
- Highest elevation: 339 m (1,112 ft)
- Lowest elevation: 215 m (705 ft)
- Population (2023): 130
  - Density: 14/km^{2} (37/sq mi)
- Time zone: UTC+01:00 (CET)
  - Summer (DST): UTC+02:00 (CEST)
- INSEE/Postal code: 46026 /46230
- ^{1} French Land Register data, which excludes lakes, ponds, glaciers > 1 km^{2} (0.386 sq mi or 247 acres) and river estuaries.

Belmont-Sainte-Foi (French pronunciation: [bɛlmɔ̃ sɛ̃t fwa]; Occitan: Bèlmont de Senta Fe) is a commune in the Lot department in southwestern France.

== Population ==
Historical population
Year	Pop.	±% p.a.
1968	107	—
1975	92	−2.13%
1982	102	+1.48%
1990	68	−4.94%
1999	105	+4.95%
2007	117	+1.36%
2012	107	−1.77%
2017	101	−1.15%
2023	130	+4.30%
Source: INSEE

== See also ==
- Communes of the Lot department
