= Labastide-Marnhac =

Labastide-Marnhac La Bastida de Marnhac (Occitan)
- Commune
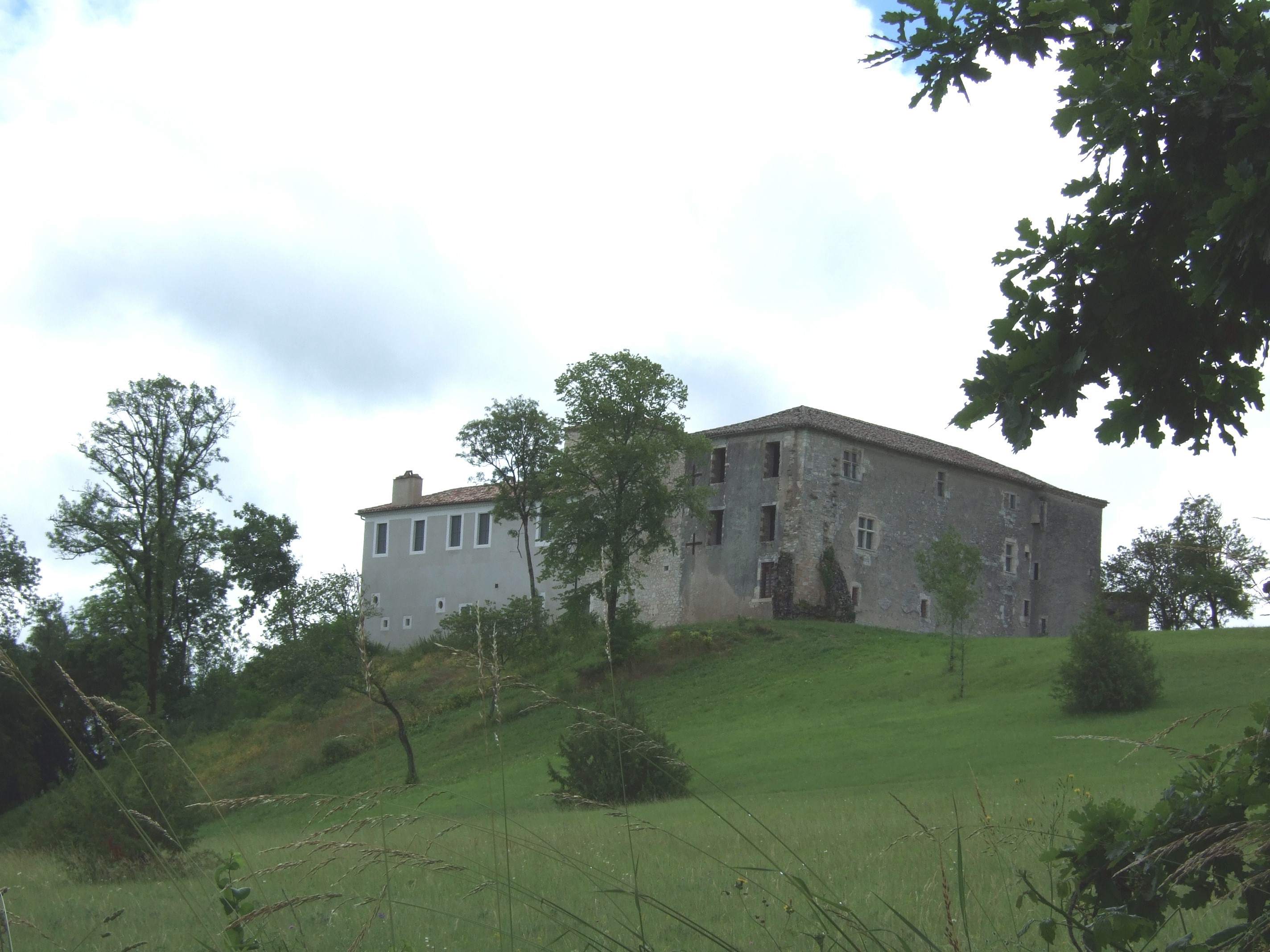
- Château de Labastide-Marnhac

- Coat of arms
- Location of Labastide-Marnhac
- Location within France Location within Occitanie
- Coordinates: 44°23′22″N 1°24′01″E
- Country: France
- Region: Occitania
- Department: Lot
- Arrondissement: Cahors
- Canton: Cahors-3
- Intercommunality: CA Grand Cahors

Government
  - Mayor (2020–2026): Daniel Jarry
- Area^{1}: 28.87 km^{2} (11.15 sq mi)
- Highest elevation: 320 m (1,050 ft)
- Lowest elevation: 137 m (449 ft)
- Population (2023): 1,311
  - Density: 45.41/km^{2} (117.6/sq mi)
- Time zone: UTC+01:00 (CET)
  - Summer (DST): UTC+02:00 (CEST)
- INSEE/Postal code: 46137 /46090
- ^{1} French Land Register data, which excludes lakes, ponds, glaciers > 1 km^{2} (0.386 sq mi or 247 acres) and river estuaries.

Labastide-Marnhac (Occitan: La Bastida de Marnhac) is a commune in the Lot department in the Occitania region in Southwestern France. As of 2023, the population of the commune was 1,311.

== See also ==
- Communes of the Lot department
