= Vaylats =

- Commune
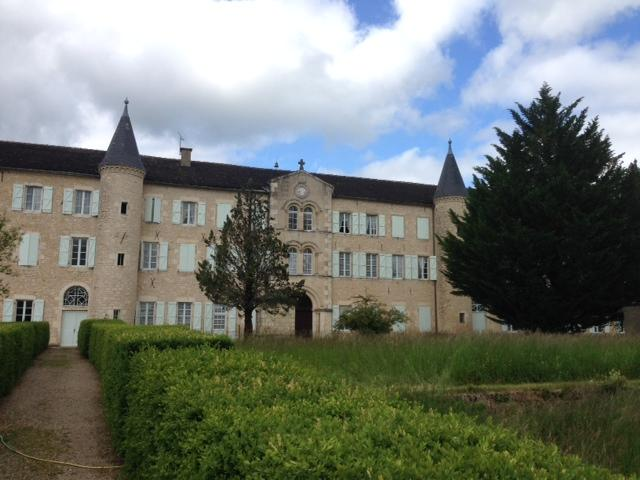
- The 19th century convent
- Location of Vaylats
- Location within France Location within Occitanie
- Coordinates: 44°20′17″N 1°38′37″E
- Country: France
- Region: Occitania
- Department: Lot
- Arrondissement: Cahors
- Canton: Marches du Sud-Quercy
- Intercommunality: Pays de Lalbenque-Limogne

Government
  - Mayor (2020–2026): Bertrand Gouraud
- Area^{1}: 26.37 km^{2} (10.18 sq mi)
- Highest elevation: 326 m (1,070 ft)
- Lowest elevation: 210 m (690 ft)
- Population (2023): 327
  - Density: 12.4/km^{2} (32.1/sq mi)
- Time zone: UTC+01:00 (CET)
  - Summer (DST): UTC+02:00 (CEST)
- INSEE/Postal code: 46329 /46230
- Website: vaylats.free.fr
- ^{1} French Land Register data, which excludes lakes, ponds, glaciers > 1 km^{2} (0.386 sq mi or 247 acres) and river estuaries.

Vaylats is a commune in the Lot department in south-western France.

== See also ==
- Communes of the Lot department
