= Belfort-du-Quercy =

- Commune
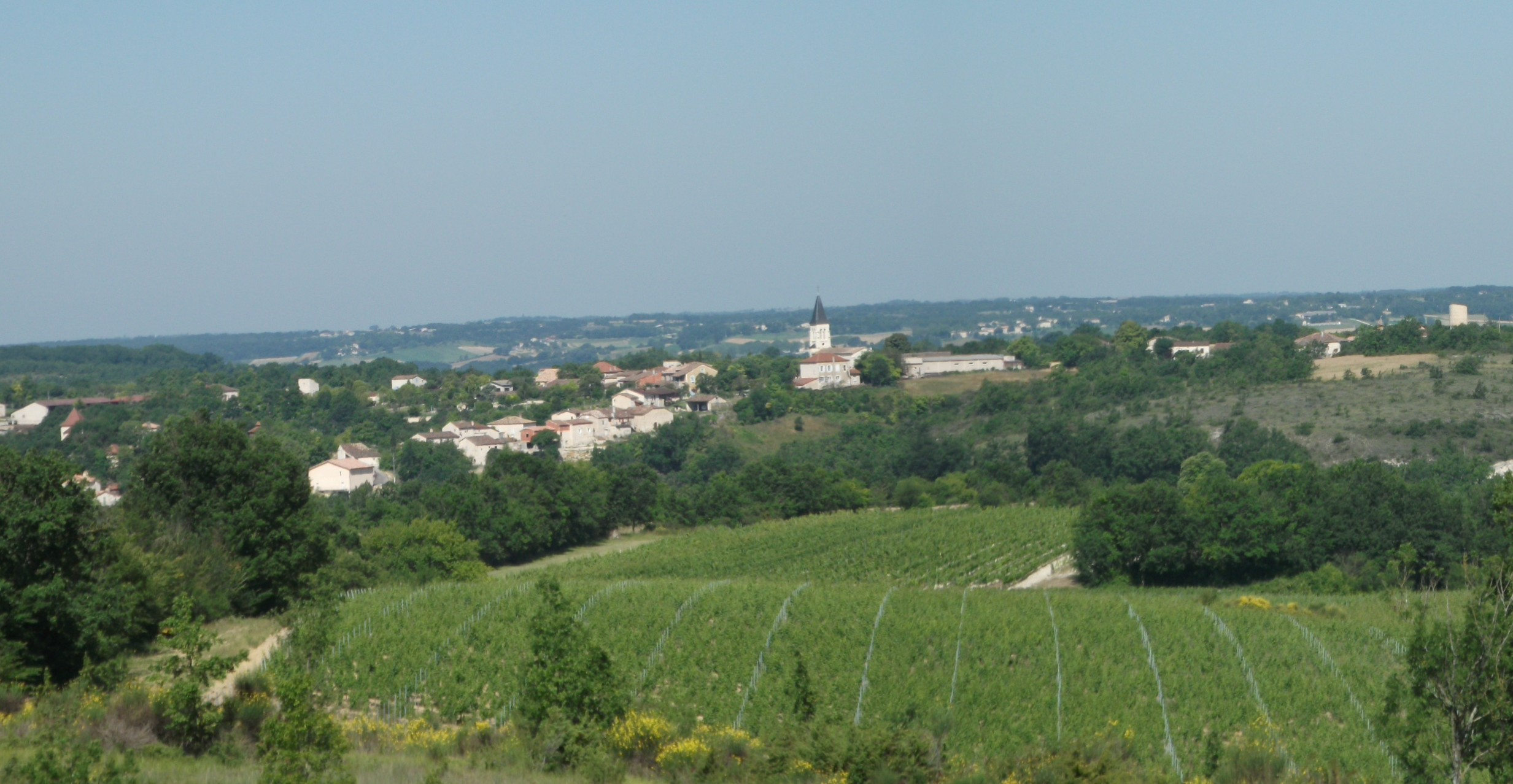
- A general view of Belfort-du-Quercy
- Location of Belfort-du-Quercy
- Location within France Location within Occitanie
- Coordinates: 44°16′09″N 1°32′37″E
- Country: France
- Region: Occitania
- Department: Lot
- Arrondissement: Cahors
- Canton: Marches du Sud-Quercy
- Intercommunality: Pays de Lalbenque-Limogne

Government
  - Mayor (2020–2026): Francis Figeac
- Area^{1}: 36.19 km^{2} (13.97 sq mi)
- Elevation: 239 m (784 ft)
- Highest elevation: 307 m (1,007 ft)
- Lowest elevation: 153 m (502 ft)
- Population (2023): 504
  - Density: 13.9/km^{2} (36.1/sq mi)
- Time zone: UTC+01:00 (CET)
  - Summer (DST): UTC+02:00 (CEST)
- INSEE/Postal code: 46023 /46230
- ^{1} French Land Register data, which excludes lakes, ponds, glaciers > 1 km^{2} (0.386 sq mi or 247 acres) and river estuaries.

Belfort-du-Quercy (French pronunciation: [bɛlfɔʁ də kɛʁsi], literally Belfort of the Quercy; Languedocien: Bèlfòrt de Carcin) is a commune in the Lot department in southwestern France.

== Population ==
Historical population
Year	Pop.	±% p.a.
1968	519	—
1975	483	−1.02%
1982	441	−1.29%
1990	458	+0.47%
1999	464	+0.14%
2007	520	+1.43%
2012	508	−0.47%
2017	516	+0.31%
2023	504	−0.39%
Source: INSEE

== See also ==
- Communes of the Lot department
