= Flaujac-Poujols =

- Commune
- Location of Flaujac-Poujols
- Location within France Location within Occitanie
- Coordinates: 44°24′24″N 1°30′01″E
- Country: France
- Region: Occitania
- Department: Lot
- Arrondissement: Cahors
- Canton: Cahors-3
- Intercommunality: Pays de Lalbenque-Limogne

Government
  - Mayor (2020–2026): Nelly Ginestet
- Area^{1}: 12.64 km^{2} (4.88 sq mi)
- Highest elevation: 295 m (968 ft)
- Lowest elevation: 144 m (472 ft)
- Population (2023): 811
  - Density: 64.2/km^{2} (166/sq mi)
- Time zone: UTC+01:00 (CET)
  - Summer (DST): UTC+02:00 (CEST)
- INSEE/Postal code: 46105 /46090
- ^{1} French Land Register data, which excludes lakes, ponds, glaciers > 1 km^{2} (0.386 sq mi or 247 acres) and river estuaries.

Flaujac-Poujols (French pronunciation: [floʒak puʒɔl]; Occitan: Flaujac e Pojòls) is a commune in the Lot department in south-western France.

== See also ==
- Communes of the Lot department
