= Laramière =

- Commune
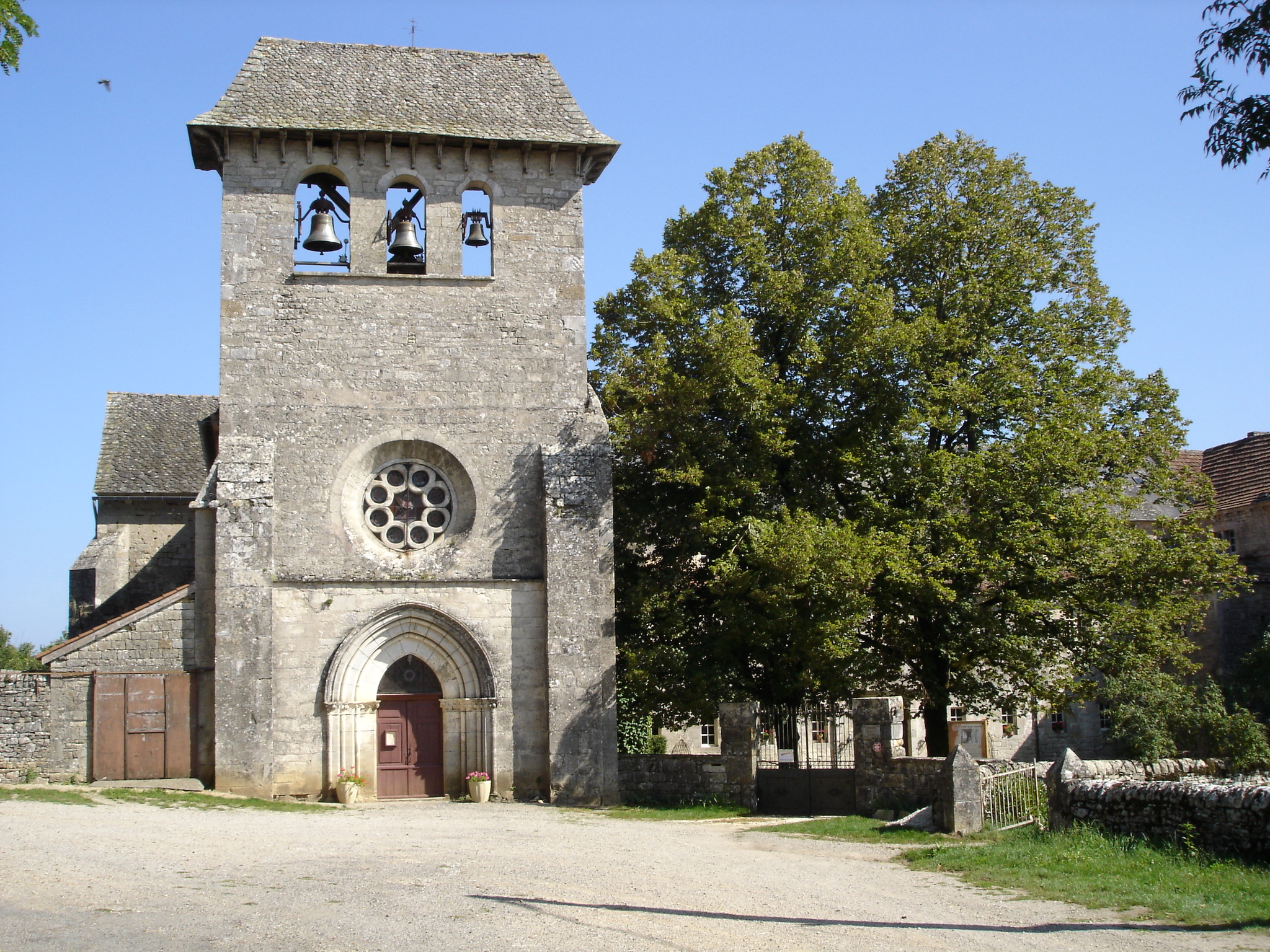
- The church in Laramière
- Location of Laramière
- Location within France Location within Occitanie
- Coordinates: 44°21′10″N 1°52′45″E
- Country: France
- Region: Occitania
- Department: Lot
- Arrondissement: Cahors
- Canton: Marches du Sud-Quercy

Government
  - Mayor (2020–2026): Valérie Boulpicante
- Area^{1}: 22.08 km^{2} (8.53 sq mi)
- Elevation: 367 m (1,204 ft)
- Highest elevation: 415 m (1,362 ft)
- Lowest elevation: 323 m (1,060 ft)
- Population (2023): 356
  - Density: 16.1/km^{2} (41.8/sq mi)
- Demonym(s): Ramiérois, Ramiéroises
- Time zone: UTC+01:00 (CET)
  - Summer (DST): UTC+02:00 (CEST)
- INSEE/Postal code: 46154 /46260
- ^{1} French Land Register data, which excludes lakes, ponds, glaciers > 1 km^{2} (0.386 sq mi or 247 acres) and river estuaries.

Laramière (French pronunciation: [laʁamjɛʁ]; Occitan: La Ramièra) is a commune in the Lot department in south-western France.

== See also ==
- Communes of the Lot department
