= Vidaillac =

- Commune
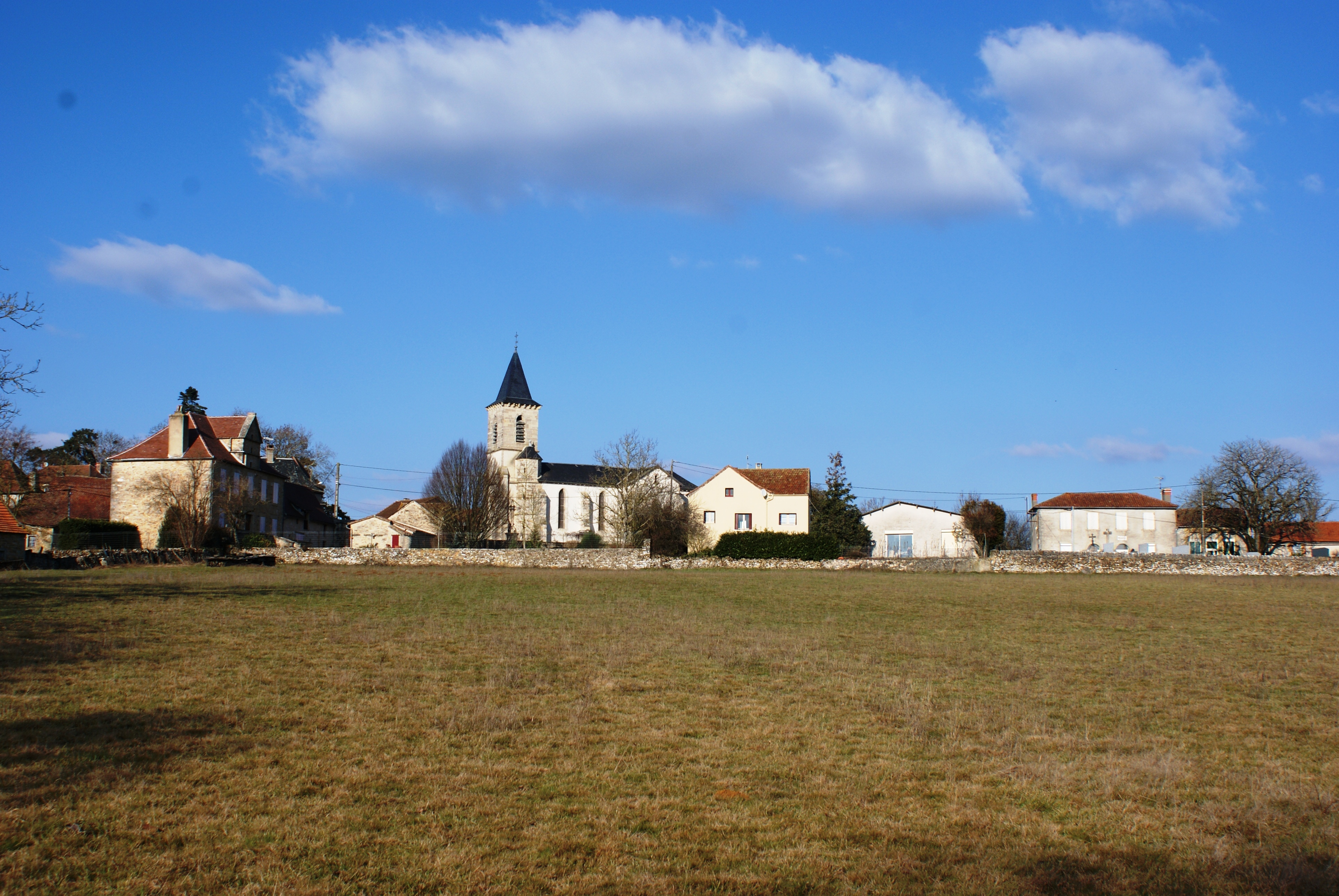
- A general view of Vidaillac
- Location of Vidaillac
- Location within France Location within Occitanie
- Coordinates: 44°20′23″N 1°49′37″E
- Country: France
- Region: Occitania
- Department: Lot
- Arrondissement: Cahors
- Canton: Marches du Sud-Quercy

Government
  - Mayor (2020–2026): Francis Teulier
- Area^{1}: 9.49 km^{2} (3.66 sq mi)
- Elevation: 349 m (1,145 ft)
- Highest elevation: 406 m (1,332 ft)
- Lowest elevation: 338 m (1,109 ft)
- Population (2023): 181
  - Density: 19.1/km^{2} (49.4/sq mi)
- Time zone: UTC+01:00 (CET)
  - Summer (DST): UTC+02:00 (CEST)
- INSEE/Postal code: 46333 /46260
- ^{1} French Land Register data, which excludes lakes, ponds, glaciers > 1 km^{2} (0.386 sq mi or 247 acres) and river estuaries.

Vidaillac (French pronunciation: [vidajak]; Occitan: Vidalhac) is a commune in the Lot department in south-western France.

== See also ==
- Communes of the Lot department
