= Montdoumerc =

- Commune
- Location of Montdoumerc
- Location within France Location within Occitanie
- Coordinates: 44°17′10″N 1°31′17″E
- Country: France
- Region: Occitania
- Department: Lot
- Arrondissement: Cahors
- Canton: Marches du Sud-Quercy
- Intercommunality: Pays de Lalbenque-Limogne

Government
  - Mayor (2020–2026): Francis Cammas
- Area^{1}: 13.62 km^{2} (5.26 sq mi)
- Elevation: 252 m (827 ft)
- Highest elevation: 282 m (925 ft)
- Lowest elevation: 176 m (577 ft)
- Population (2023): 577
  - Density: 42.4/km^{2} (110/sq mi)
- Time zone: UTC+01:00 (CET)
  - Summer (DST): UTC+02:00 (CEST)
- INSEE/Postal code: 46202 /46230
- ^{1} French Land Register data, which excludes lakes, ponds, glaciers > 1 km^{2} (0.386 sq mi or 247 acres) and river estuaries.

Montdoumerc (French pronunciation: [mɔ̃dumɛʁk]; Occitan: Montdomèrc) is a commune in the Lot department in south-western France.

== See also ==
- Communes of the Lot department
