= Fontanes, Lot =

Fontanes
- Commune
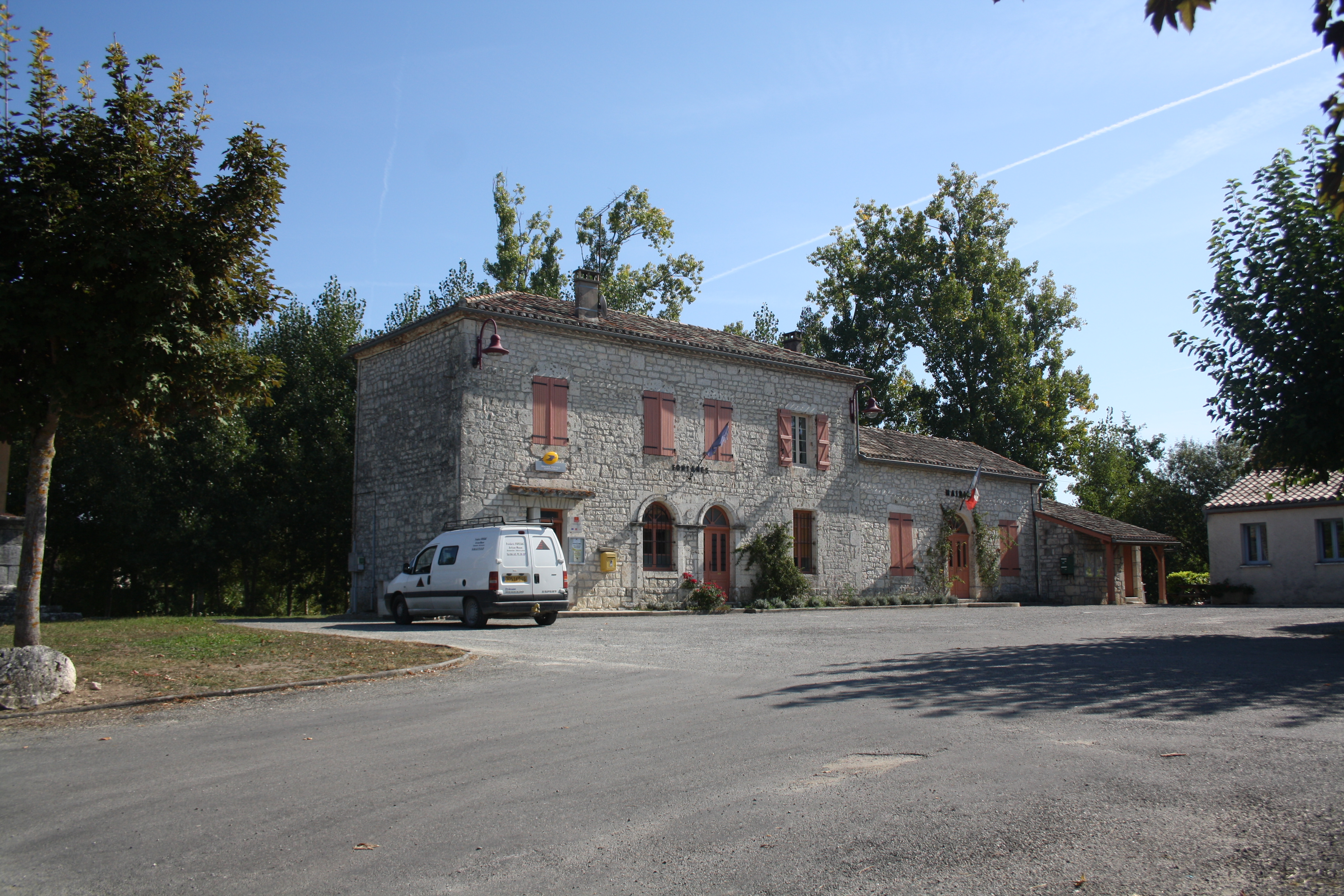
- The town hall in Fontanes
- Location of Fontanes
- Location within France Location within Occitanie
- Coordinates: 44°18′45″N 1°29′55″E
- Country: France
- Region: Occitania
- Department: Lot
- Arrondissement: Cahors
- Canton: Marches du Sud-Quercy
- Intercommunality: CA Grand Cahors

Government
  - Mayor (2020–2026): Roselyne Valette
- Area^{1}: 16.44 km^{2} (6.35 sq mi)
- Elevation: 219 m (719 ft)
- Highest elevation: 296 m (971 ft)
- Lowest elevation: 199 m (653 ft)
- Population (2023): 547
  - Density: 33.3/km^{2} (86.2/sq mi)
- Time zone: UTC+01:00 (CET)
  - Summer (DST): UTC+02:00 (CEST)
- INSEE/Postal code: 46109 /46230
- ^{1} French Land Register data, which excludes lakes, ponds, glaciers > 1 km^{2} (0.386 sq mi or 247 acres) and river estuaries.

Fontanes (French pronunciation: [fɔ̃tan]; Occitan: Fontanas) is a commune in the Lot department in south-western France.

== See also ==
- Communes of the Lot department
