= Pern-Lhospitalet =

- Commune
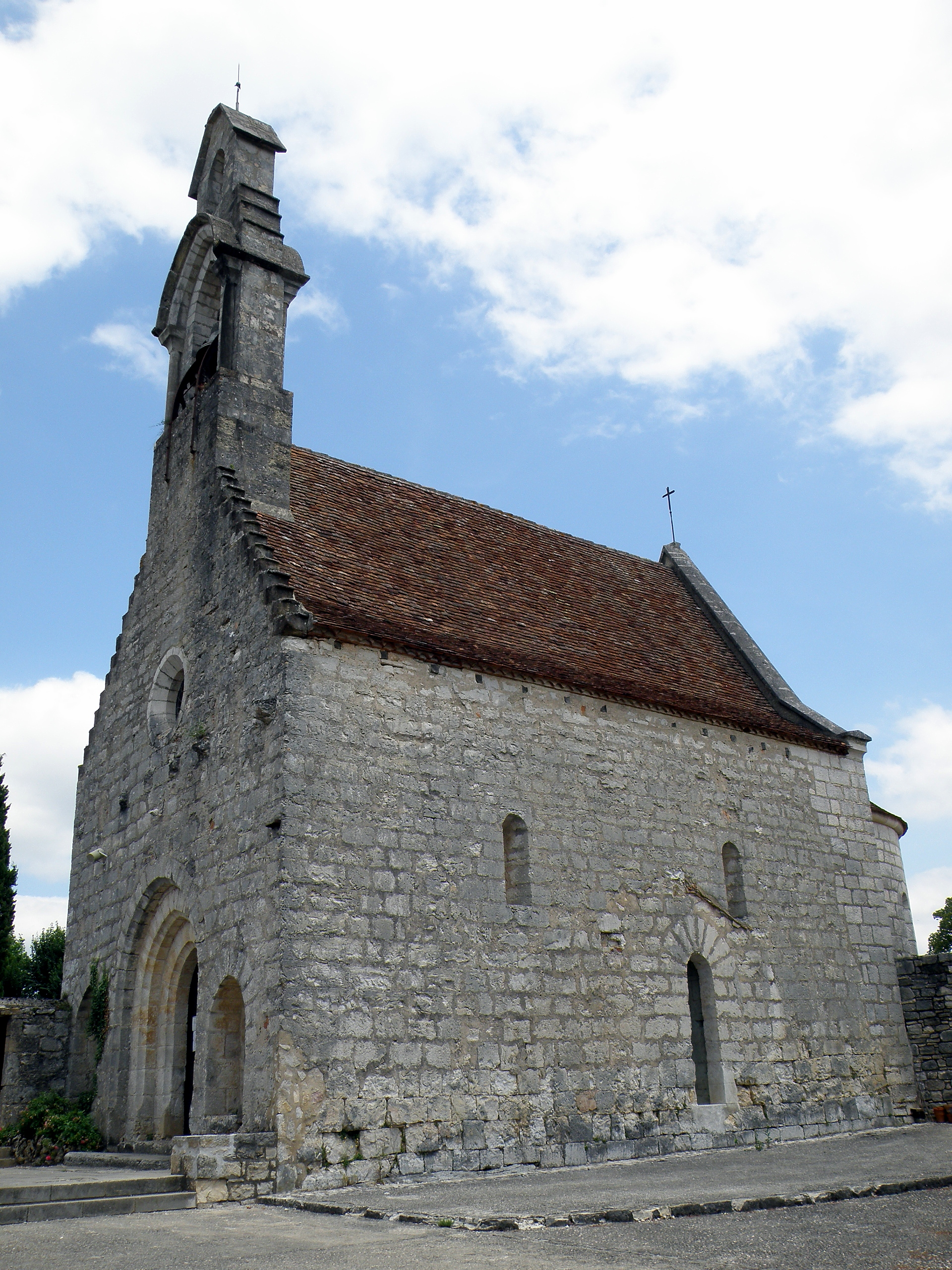
- The church in Lhospitalet
- Location of Pern-Lhospitalet
- Location within France Location within Occitanie
- Coordinates: 44°21′43″N 1°24′32″E
- Country: France
- Region: Occitania
- Department: Lot
- Arrondissement: Cahors
- Canton: Marches du Sud-Quercy
- Intercommunality: CC Quercy Blanc
- Area^{1}: 40.31 km^{2} (15.56 sq mi)
- Highest elevation: 330 m (1,080 ft)
- Lowest elevation: 198 m (650 ft)
- Population (2023): 925
  - Density: 22.9/km^{2} (59.4/sq mi)
- Time zone: UTC+01:00 (CET)
  - Summer (DST): UTC+02:00 (CEST)
- INSEE/Postal code: 46172 /46170
- ^{1} French Land Register data, which excludes lakes, ponds, glaciers > 1 km^{2} (0.386 sq mi or 247 acres) and river estuaries.

Pern-Lhospitalet (French pronunciation: [pɛʁn lɔspitalɛ]) is a commune in the Lot department in south-western France. It was formed on 1 January 2025, with the merger of Lhospitalet and Pern.

== See also ==
- Communes of the Lot department
