= Le Montat =

- Commune
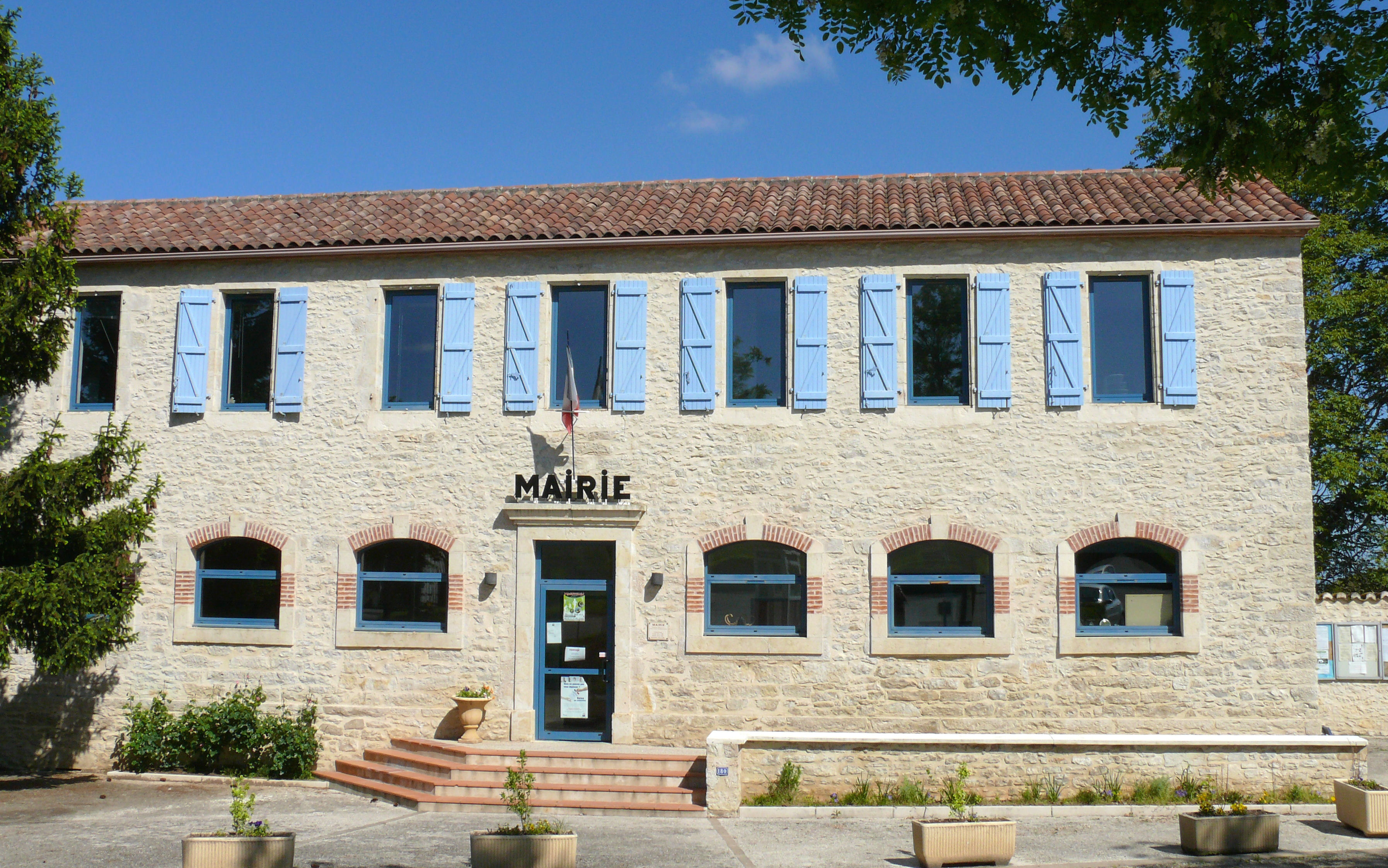
- The town hall in Le Montat

- Coat of arms
- Location of Le Montat
- Location within France Location within Occitanie
- Coordinates: 44°22′51″N 1°26′59″E
- Country: France
- Region: Occitania
- Department: Lot
- Arrondissement: Cahors
- Canton: Cahors-3
- Intercommunality: CA Grand Cahors

Government
  - Mayor (2020–2026): Jean-Paul Mougeot
- Area^{1}: 22.54 km^{2} (8.70 sq mi)
- Elevation: 271 m (889 ft)
- Highest elevation: 303 m (994 ft)
- Lowest elevation: 132 m (433 ft)
- Population (2023): 1,107
  - Density: 49.11/km^{2} (127.2/sq mi)
- Time zone: UTC+01:00 (CET)
  - Summer (DST): UTC+02:00 (CEST)
- INSEE/Postal code: 46197 /46090
- ^{1} French Land Register data, which excludes lakes, ponds, glaciers > 1 km^{2} (0.386 sq mi or 247 acres) and river estuaries.

Le Montat (French pronunciation: [lə mɔ̃ta]；Occitan: Lo Montat) is a commune in the Lot department in south-western France.

== See also ==
- Communes of the Lot department
