= Cézac, Lot =

Cézac
- Commune
- Coat of arms
- Location of Cézac
- Location within France Location within Occitanie
- Coordinates: 44°20′27″N 1°20′15″E
- Country: France
- Region: Occitania
- Department: Lot
- Arrondissement: Cahors
- Canton: Marches du Sud-Quercy
- Intercommunality: Quercy Blanc

Government
  - Mayor (2020–2026): Maurice Roussillon
- Area^{1}: 17.34 km^{2} (6.70 sq mi)
- Elevation: 197 m (646 ft)
- Highest elevation: 288 m (945 ft)
- Lowest elevation: 174 m (571 ft)
- Population (2023): 179
  - Density: 10.3/km^{2} (26.7/sq mi)
- Time zone: UTC+01:00 (CET)
  - Summer (DST): UTC+02:00 (CEST)
- INSEE/Postal code: 46069 /46170
- ^{1} French Land Register data, which excludes lakes, ponds, glaciers > 1 km^{2} (0.386 sq mi or 247 acres) and river estuaries.

Cézac (French pronunciation: [sezak]; Languedocien: Cesac) is a commune in the Lot department in south-western France.

== See also ==
- Communes of the Lot department
