= Cremps =

- Commune
- Location of Cremps
- Location within France Location within Occitanie
- Coordinates: 44°23′23″N 1°36′03″E
- Country: France
- Region: Occitania
- Department: Lot
- Arrondissement: Cahors
- Canton: Marches du Sud-Quercy
- Intercommunality: Pays de Lalbenque-Limogne

Government
  - Mayor (2020–2026): Nathalie Ricard
- Area^{1}: 19.66 km^{2} (7.59 sq mi)
- Highest elevation: 283 m (928 ft)
- Lowest elevation: 173 m (568 ft)
- Population (2023): 410
  - Density: 21/km^{2} (54/sq mi)
- Time zone: UTC+01:00 (CET)
  - Summer (DST): UTC+02:00 (CEST)
- INSEE/Postal code: 46082 /46230
- ^{1} French Land Register data, which excludes lakes, ponds, glaciers > 1 km^{2} (0.386 sq mi or 247 acres) and river estuaries.

Cremps is a commune in the Lot department in south-western France.

== See also ==
- Communes of the Lot department
