= Aujols =

- Commune
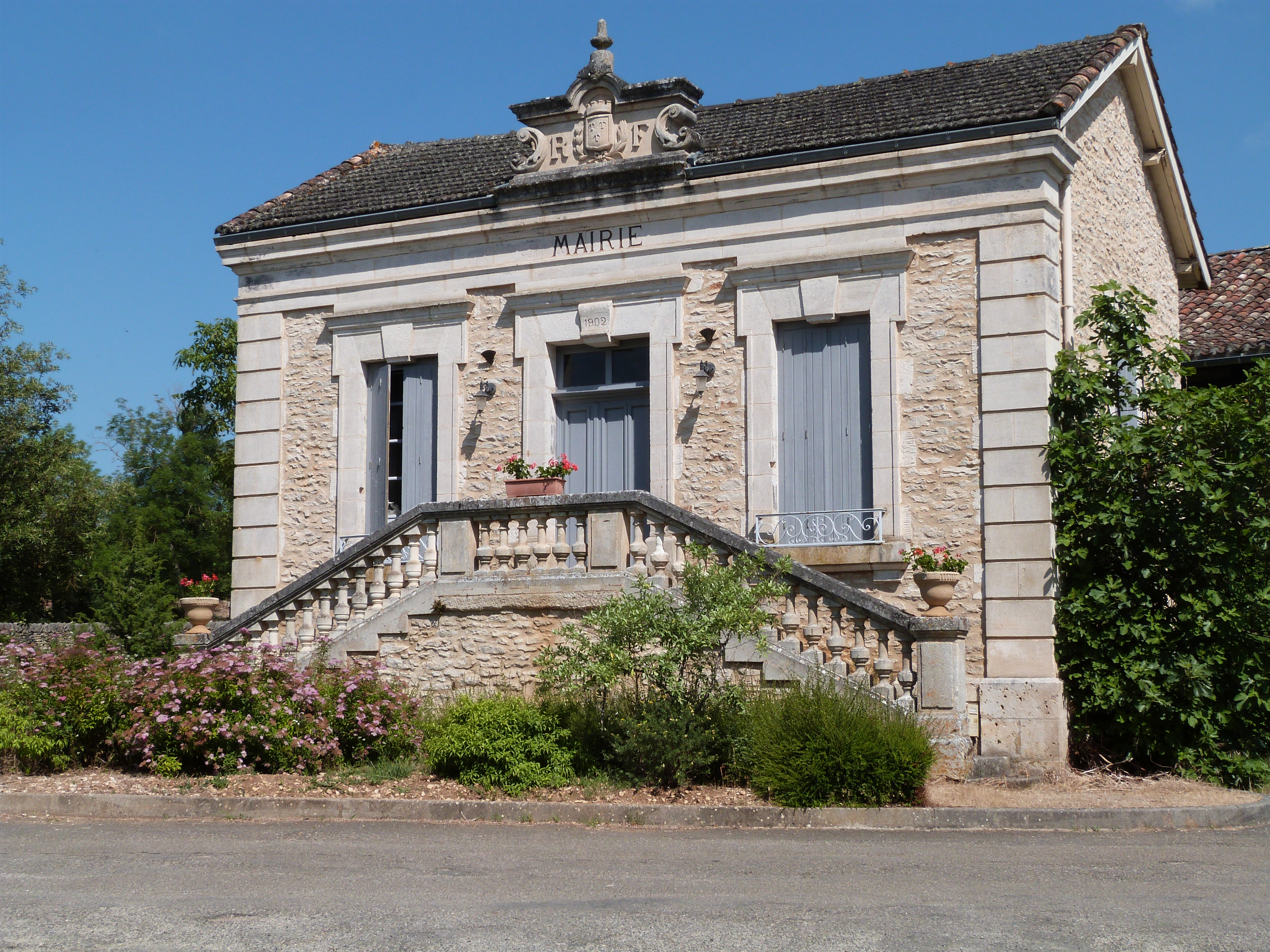
- The town hall in Aujols

- Coat of arms
- Location of Aujols
- Location within France Location within Occitanie
- Coordinates: 44°24′32″N 1°32′59″E
- Country: France
- Region: Occitania
- Department: Lot
- Arrondissement: Cahors
- Canton: Marches du Sud-Quercy
- Intercommunality: CC Pays Lalbenque-Limogne

Government
  - Mayor (2020–2026): Geneviève Dejean
- Area^{1}: 16.43 km^{2} (6.34 sq mi)
- Elevation: 200 m (660 ft)
- Highest elevation: 270 m (890 ft)
- Lowest elevation: 131 m (430 ft)
- Population (2023): 383
  - Density: 23.3/km^{2} (60.4/sq mi)
- Time zone: UTC+01:00 (CET)
  - Summer (DST): UTC+02:00 (CEST)
- INSEE/Postal code: 46010 /46090
- ^{1} French Land Register data, which excludes lakes, ponds, glaciers > 1 km^{2} (0.386 sq mi or 247 acres) and river estuaries.

Aujols (French pronunciation: [oʒɔl]; Occitan: Aujòls) is a commune in the Lot department in southwestern France.

== Population ==
Historical population
Year	Pop.	±% p.a.
1968	166	—
1975	148	−1.63%
1982	192	+3.79%
1990	197	+0.32%
1999	243	+2.36%
2007	272	+1.42%
2012	331	+4.00%
2017	364	+1.92%
2023	383	+0.85%
Source: INSEE

== See also ==
- Communes of the Lot department
