= Varaire =

- Commune
- Location of Varaire
- Location within France Location within Occitanie
- Coordinates: 44°21′31″N 1°43′29″E
- Country: France
- Region: Occitania
- Department: Lot
- Arrondissement: Cahors
- Canton: Marches du Sud-Quercy
- Intercommunality: Pays de Lalbenque-Limogne

Government
  - Mayor (2020–2026): Marcel Aymard
- Area^{1}: 25.52 km^{2} (9.85 sq mi)
- Highest elevation: 404 m (1,325 ft)
- Lowest elevation: 220 m (720 ft)
- Population (2023): 359
  - Density: 14.1/km^{2} (36.4/sq mi)
- Time zone: UTC+01:00 (CET)
  - Summer (DST): UTC+02:00 (CEST)
- INSEE/Postal code: 46328 /46260
- ^{1} French Land Register data, which excludes lakes, ponds, glaciers > 1 km^{2} (0.386 sq mi or 247 acres) and river estuaries.

Varaire (French pronunciation: [vaʁɛʁ]) is a commune in the Lot department in south-western France.

== See also ==
- Communes of the Lot department
