= Castelnau-Montratier =

- Commune
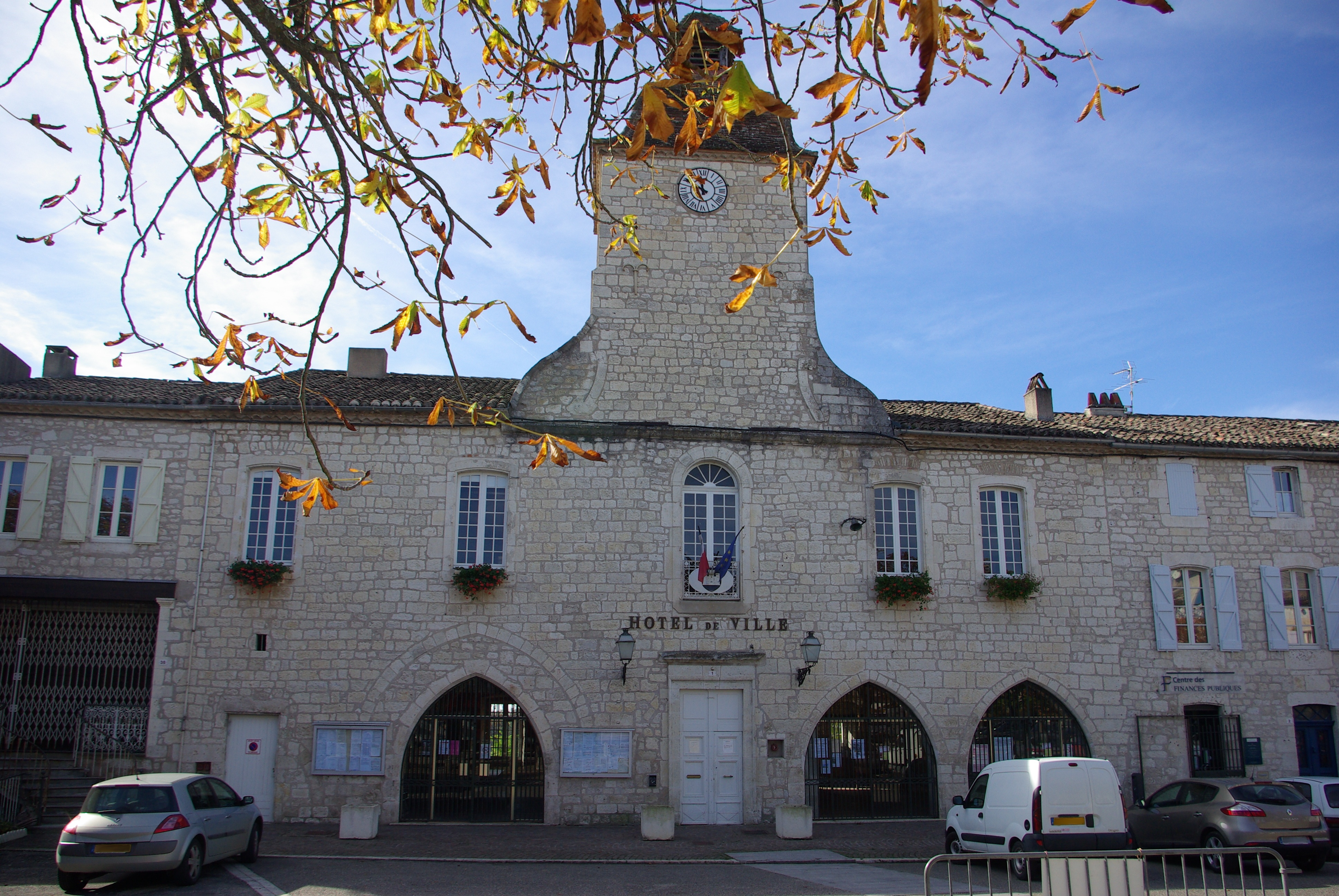
- The town hall of Castelnau-Montratier
- Location of Castelnau-Montratier
- Location within France Location within Occitanie
- Coordinates: 44°16′12″N 1°21′14″E
- Country: France
- Region: Occitania
- Department: Lot
- Arrondissement: Cahors
- Canton: Marches du Sud-Quercy
- Intercommunality: Quercy Blanc

Government
  - Mayor (2020–2026): Dominique Marin
- Area^{1}: 84.76 km^{2} (32.73 sq mi)
- Population (2023): 1,840
  - Density: 21.7/km^{2} (56.2/sq mi)
- Time zone: UTC+01:00 (CET)
  - Summer (DST): UTC+02:00 (CEST)
- INSEE/Postal code: 46063 /46170
- ^{1} French Land Register data, which excludes lakes, ponds, glaciers > 1 km^{2} (0.386 sq mi or 247 acres) and river estuaries.

Castelnau-Montratier (French pronunciation: [kastɛlno mɔ̃ʁatje]; before 2024: Castelnau-Montratier-Sainte-Alauzie; Languedocien: Castèlnau de Montratièr e Senta Alàusia) is a commune in the department of Lot, southern France. The municipality was established on 1 January 2017, by the merger of the former communes of Castelnau-Montratier (the seat) and Sainte-Alauzie.

== See also ==
- Communes of the Lot department
