= Beauregard, Lot =

Beauregard
- Commune
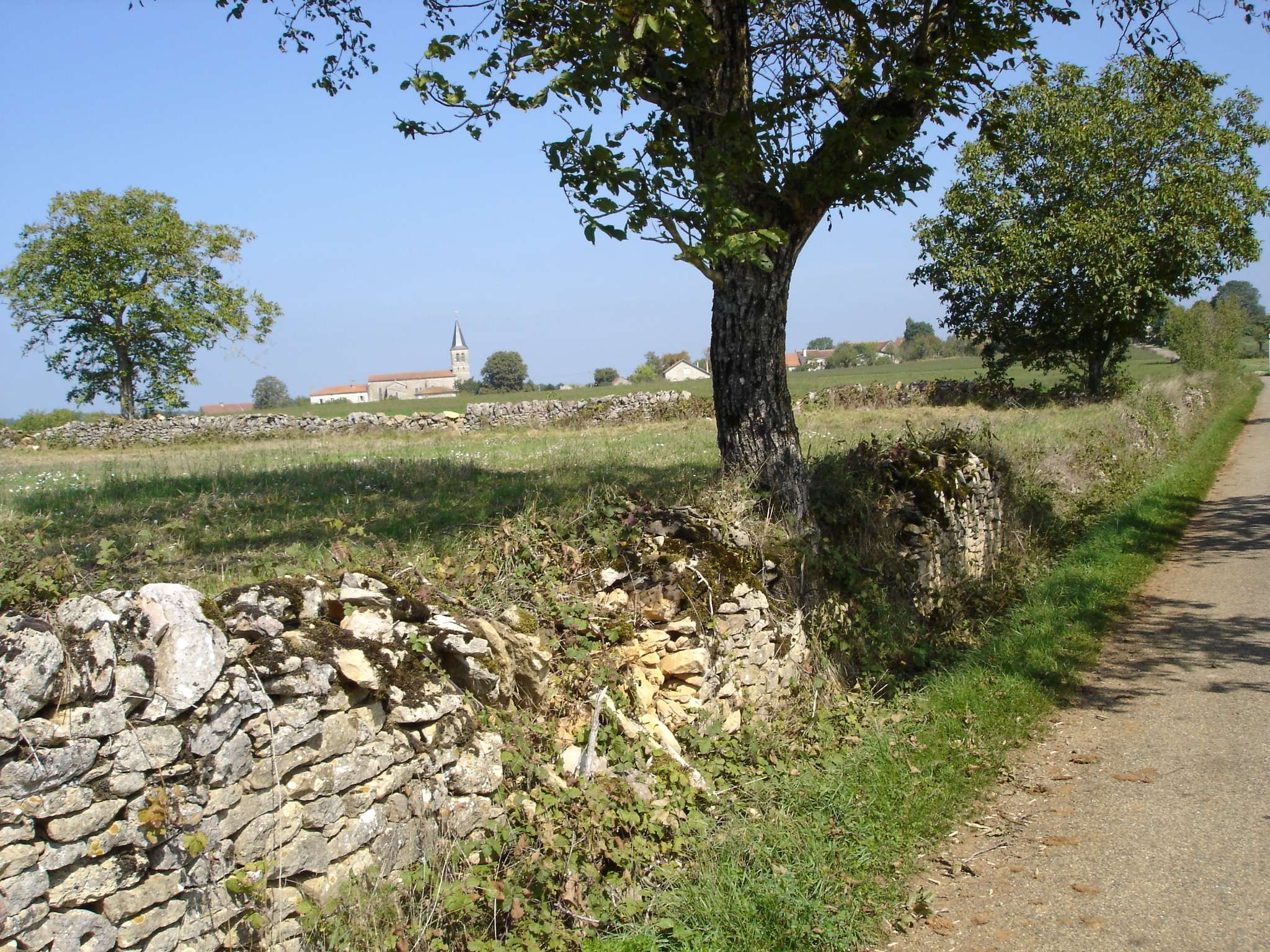
- A distant view of Beauregard
- Location of Beauregard
- Location within France Location within Occitanie
- Coordinates: 44°20′48″N 1°47′37″E
- Country: France
- Region: Occitania
- Department: Lot
- Arrondissement: Cahors
- Canton: Marches du Sud-Quercy

Government
  - Mayor (2020–2026): Didier Linou
- Area^{1}: 15.30 km^{2} (5.91 sq mi)
- Elevation: 360 m (1,180 ft)
- Highest elevation: 396 m (1,299 ft)
- Lowest elevation: 298 m (978 ft)
- Population (2023): 238
  - Density: 15.6/km^{2} (40.3/sq mi)
- Time zone: UTC+01:00 (CET)
  - Summer (DST): UTC+02:00 (CEST)
- INSEE/Postal code: 46020 /46260
- ^{1} French Land Register data, which excludes lakes, ponds, glaciers > 1 km^{2} (0.386 sq mi or 247 acres) and river estuaries.

Beauregard (Languedocien: Bèlregard) is a commune in the Lot department in southwestern France.

== Population ==
Historical population
Year	Pop.	±% p.a.
1968	217	—
1975	177	−2.87%
1982	167	−0.83%
1990	184	+1.22%
1999	188	+0.24%
2007	239	+3.05%
2012	238	−0.08%
2017	233	−0.42%
2023	238	+0.35%
Source: INSEE

== See also ==
- Communes of the Lot department
