= Canton of Marches du Sud-Quercy =

Coordinates: 44.27°N 1.35°E

The canton of Marches du Sud-Quercy is an administrative division of the Lot department, southern France. It was created at the French canton reorganisation which came into effect in March 2015. Its seat is in Castelnau-Montratier.

It consists of the following communes:

1. Aujols
2. Bach
3. Beauregard
4. Belfort-du-Quercy
5. Belmont-Sainte-Foi
6. Castelnau-Montratier
7. Cézac
8. Concots
9. Cremps
10. Escamps
11. Fontanes
12. Laburgade
13. Lalbenque
14. Laramière
15. Limogne-en-Quercy
16. Lugagnac
17. Montdoumerc
18. Pern-Lhospitalet
19. Promilhanes
20. Saillac
21. Saint-Paul-Flaugnac
22. Varaire
23. Vaylats
24. Vidaillac
