= Arrondissement of Cahors =

Coordinates: 44°27′N 1°26′E

Cahors
- Arrondissement
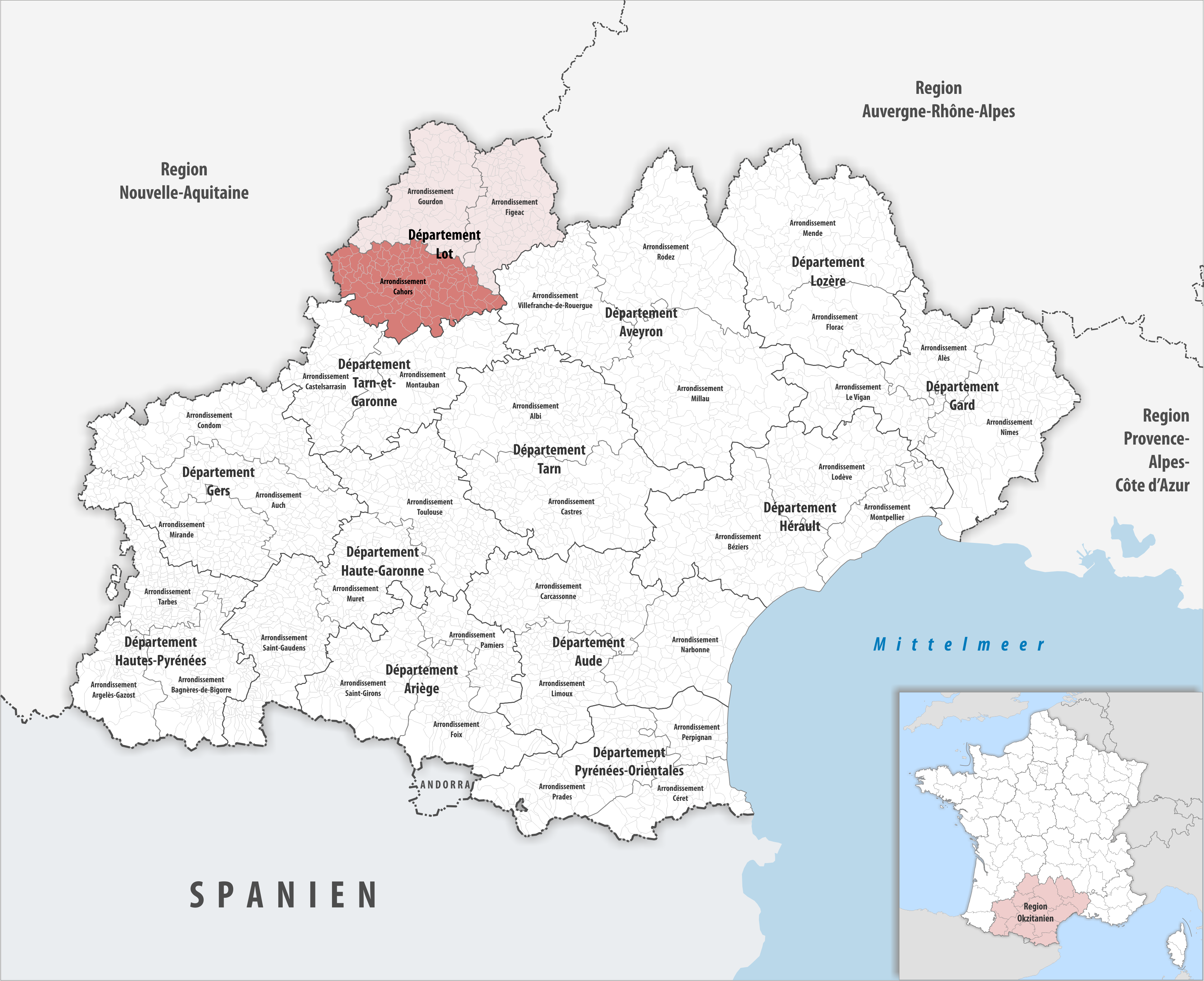
- Location within the region Occitanie
- Country: France
- Region: Occitania
- Department: Lot
- No. of communes: {{{nbcomm}}}
- Area: 1,860.9 km^{2} (718.5 sq mi)
- Population (2023): 74,215
  - Density: 39.881/km^{2} (103.29/sq mi)
- INSEE code: 461

The arrondissement of Cahors is an arrondissement of France in the Lot department in the Occitanie région. It has 97 communes. Its population is 73,707 (2021), and its area is 1,860.9 km^{2} (718.5 sq mi).

== Composition ==
The communes of the arrondissement of Cahors, and their INSEE codes, are:

1. Albas (46001)
2. Anglars-Juillac (46005)
3. Arcambal (46007)
4. Aujols (46010)
5. Bach (46013)
6. Barguelonne-en-Quercy (46263)
7. Beauregard (46020)
8. Bélaye (46022)
9. Belfort-du-Quercy (46023)
10. Bellefont-La Rauze (46156)
11. Belmont-Sainte-Foi (46026)
12. Berganty (46027)
13. Boissières (46032)
14. Bouziès (46037)
15. Cabrerets (46040)
16. Cahors (46042)
17. Caillac (46044)
18. Calamane (46046)
19. Cambayrac (46050)
20. Carnac-Rouffiac (46060)
21. Cassagnes (46061)
22. Castelfranc (46062)
23. Castelnau-Montratier-Sainte-Alauzie (46063)
24. Catus (46064)
25. Cénevières (46068)
26. Cézac (46069)
27. Cieurac (46070)
28. Concots (46073)
29. Crayssac (46080)
30. Crégols (46081)
31. Cremps (46082)
32. Douelle (46088)
33. Duravel (46089)
34. Escamps (46091)
35. Esclauzels (46092)
36. Espère (46095)
37. Flaujac-Poujols (46105)
38. Floressas (46107)
39. Fontanes (46109)
40. Francoulès (46112)
41. Gigouzac (46119)
42. Grézels (46130)
43. Les Junies (46134)
44. Labastide-Marnhac (46137)
45. Labastide-du-Vert (46136)
46. Laburgade (46140)
47. Lacapelle-Cabanac (46142)
48. Lagardelle (46147)
49. Lalbenque (46148)
50. Lamagdelaine (46149)
51. Laramière (46154)
52. Lendou-en-Quercy (46262)
53. Lherm (46171)
54. Limogne-en-Quercy (46173)
55. Lugagnac (46179)
56. Luzech (46182)
57. Mauroux (46187)
58. Maxou (46188)
59. Mechmont (46190)
60. Mercuès (46191)
61. Le Montat (46197)
62. Montcabrier (46199)
63. Montcuq-en-Quercy-Blanc (46201)
64. Montdoumerc (46202)
65. Montgesty (46205)
66. Montlauzun (46206)
67. Nuzéjouls (46211)
68. Parnac (46214)
69. Pern-Lhospitalet (46172)
70. Pescadoires (46218)
71. Pontcirq (46223)
72. Porte-du-Quercy (46033)
73. Pradines (46224)
74. Prayssac (46225)
75. Promilhanes (46227)
76. Puy-l'Évêque (46231)
77. Saillac (46247)
78. Saint-Cirq-Lapopie (46256)
79. Saint-Denis-Catus (46264)
80. Saint Géry-Vers (46268)
81. Saint-Martin-Labouval (46276)
82. Saint-Martin-le-Redon (46277)
83. Saint-Médard (46280)
84. Saint-Paul-Flaugnac (46103)
85. Saint-Pierre-Lafeuille (46340)
86. Saint-Vincent-Rive-d'Olt (46296)
87. Sauzet (46301)
88. Sérignac (46305)
89. Soturac (46307)
90. Tour-de-Faure (46320)
91. Touzac (46321)
92. Trespoux-Rassiels (46322)
93. Varaire (46328)
94. Vaylats (46329)
95. Vidaillac (46333)
96. Villesèque (46335)
97. Vire-sur-Lot (46336)

== History ==
The arrondissement of Cahors was created in 1800. At the January 2017 reorganisation of the arrondissements of Lot, it lost two communes to the arrondissement of Figeac and 18 communes to the arrondissement of Gourdon.

As a result of the reorganisation of the cantons of France which came into effect in 2015, the borders of the cantons are no longer related to the borders of the arrondissements. The cantons of the arrondissement of Cahors were, as of January 2015:

1. Cahors-Nord-Est
2. Cahors-Nord-Ouest
3. Cahors-Sud
4. Castelnau-Montratier
5. Catus
6. Cazals
7. Lalbenque
8. Lauzès
9. Limogne-en-Quercy
10. Luzech
11. Montcuq
12. Puy-l'Évêque
13. Saint-Géry
