= Quissac =

Quissac is the name of 2 communes in France:

- Quissac, Gard, in the Gard department
- Quissac, Lot, in the Lot department
