= Château de Condat =

Coordinates: 44.4822°N 1.6530°E

The Château de Condat is a mansion which was developed from a 15th-century castle in the commune of Bouziès in the Lot département of France.

Construction dates from the 15th, 17th and 18th centuries. The present château consists of two buildings, of different sizes, joined at right angles. It was part of a more important and much older structure. The ground floor is taken up with cellars, one of which is vaulted. Nearby is a cylindrical dovecote which belongs to the castle.

The château is privately owned. It has been listed since 1987 as a monument historique by the French Ministry of Culture.

== See also ==
- List of castles in France
