= Château de Montbrun (Lot) =

Ruined castle in Lot, France

Coordinates: 44.5056°N 1.9003°E

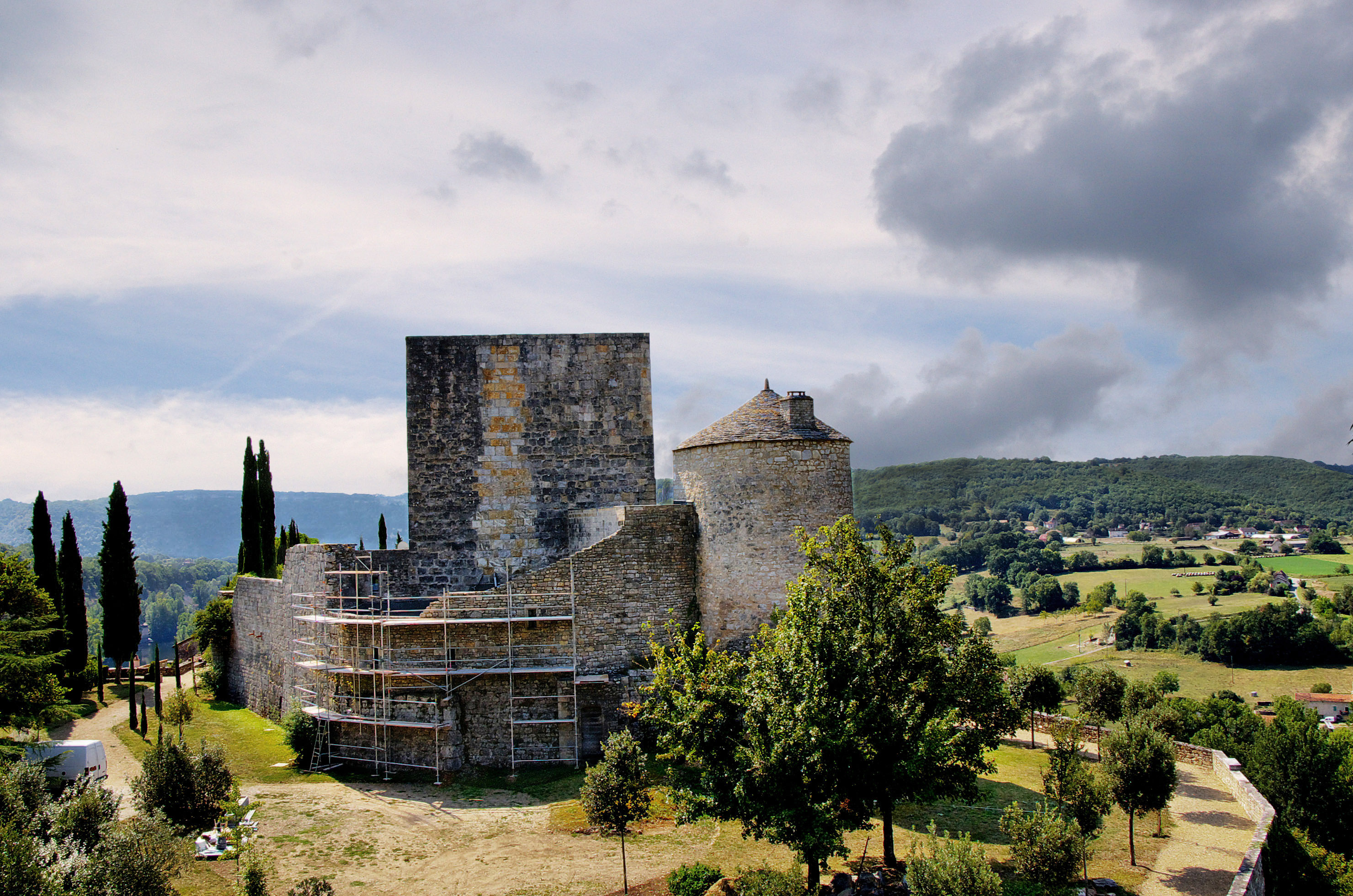
View of the Montbrun Castle

The Château de Montbrun is a ruined castle in the commune of Montbrun in the Lot département of France.

The castle dates from the 12th, 13th and 17th centuries. Its existence as an important fortified site is documented in the 13th century. The castle was built in a position overlooking a meander in the Lot river. All that remains today are the keep and two enceintes, the first still having a round tower and various defensive architectural features. Between the two are a number of terraces which have been laid out as gardens.

The site is privately owned and is not open to the public. It has been listed since 1984 as a monument historique by the French Ministry of Culture.

== See also ==
- List of castles in France
