= Château de Saint-Sulpice =

French castle

Coordinates: 44.5700°N 1.7876°E

The Château de Saint-Sulpice is a ruined castle in the commune of Saint-Sulpice in the Lot département of France.

The castle was established from a primitive medieval edifice which, at this location, closed the valley of the Célé. In the 16th century, this strong point was built up by the Saint-Sulpice family into a reputedly sumptuous residence. Today, there remains only a few stretches of wall and some architectural features. The castle was effectively razed in the 19th century to allow the construction of a spa-type house which has now disappeared.

The Château de Saint-Sulpice is privately owned and is not open to the public. It has been listed since 1988 as a monument historique by the French Ministry of Culture.

== See also ==
- List of castles in France
