= Château de Cénevières =

Castle in Cénevières in the Lot département of France

Coordinates: 44.4628°N 1.7537°E

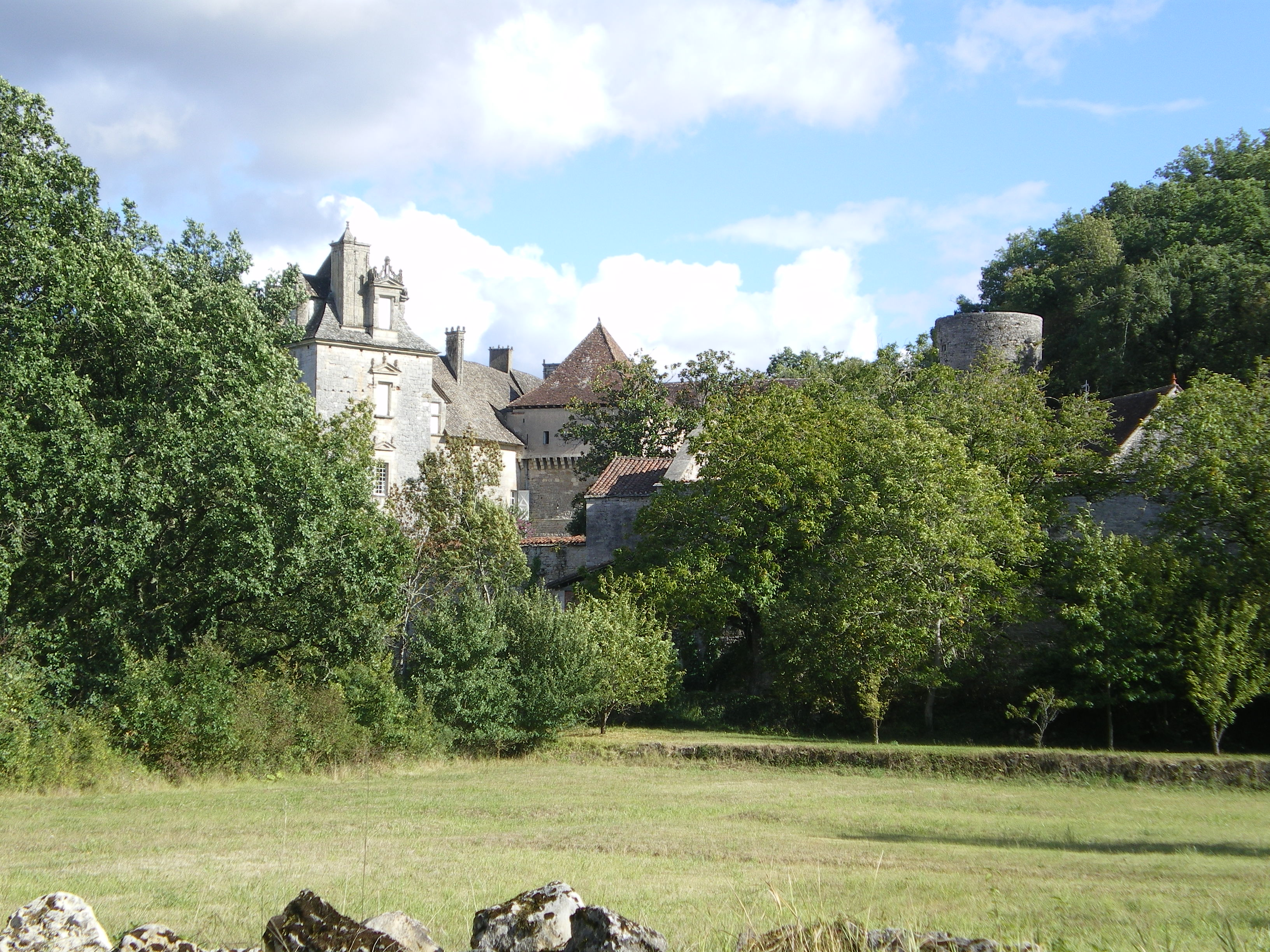
Château de Cénevières

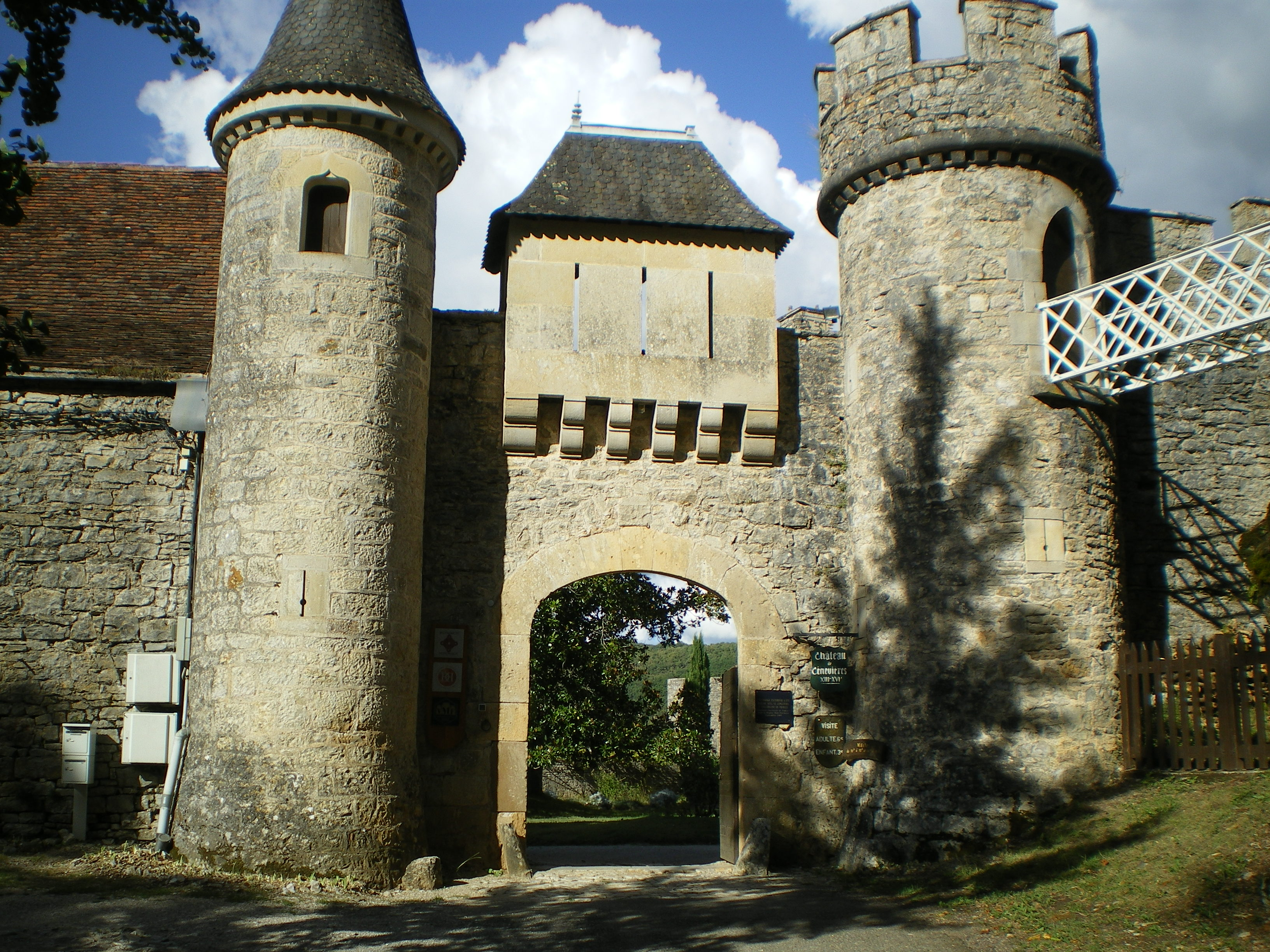

The Château de Cénevières is a castle in the commune of Cénevières in the Lot département of France.

The castle dates from the 13th century and has been significantly altered over the years, notably in the 14th, 15th and 16th centuries.

According to tradition, the castle belonged to Waïffe or Waifer, Duke of Aquitaine, and played a role in his war against Pepin the Short. The castle stands on a rock and appears as a collection of irregular buildings, flanked by towers and terraces. A former rampart wall connects the stables to the Gourdon Tower, which was, perhaps, the keep. In front of the entrance is a square building called the guard tower or postern, built in 1585. The Gothic openings have been replaced by large Renaissance windows and the defensive walls have been opened with dormers. A columned gallery circles the outside of the grand salon. An apartment has traces of a painted fresco mural showing the flight of Icarus and the chariot of the sun, the legend of Astyanax and the burning of Troy, and the kidnap of Helen.

The Château de Cénevières is privately owned. It has been listed since 1957 as a monument historique by the French Ministry of Culture.

The castle is open to visitors between April and early November. The castle also caters for weddings, conferences and other events.

== See also ==
- List of castles in France
