= Rauze Viaduct =

Rauze Viaduct Viaduc de la Rauze
- Coordinates: 44.5565°N 1.5158°E
- Carries: Vehicles on the A20 autoroute
- Crosses: River Rauze
- Locale: Nadillac, southern France

Characteristics
- Design: Box girder bridge
- Material: Reinforced concrete
- Total length: 556 m (1,824 ft)
- Width: 23.94 m (78.5 ft)
- Height: 101 m (331 ft)
- Longest span: 130 m (430 ft)
- No. of spans: 5

History
- Architect: Alain Montois; Charles Lavigne
- Constructed by: Dodin Campenon-Bernard; Spie Batignolles (prestressed concrete); Demathieu Bard; Sogea
- Fabrication by: SAMT
- Construction start: January 1999
- Construction end: March 2001
- Construction cost: 167m francs
- Opened: 12 July 2001

Location
- Interactive map of Rauze Viaduct

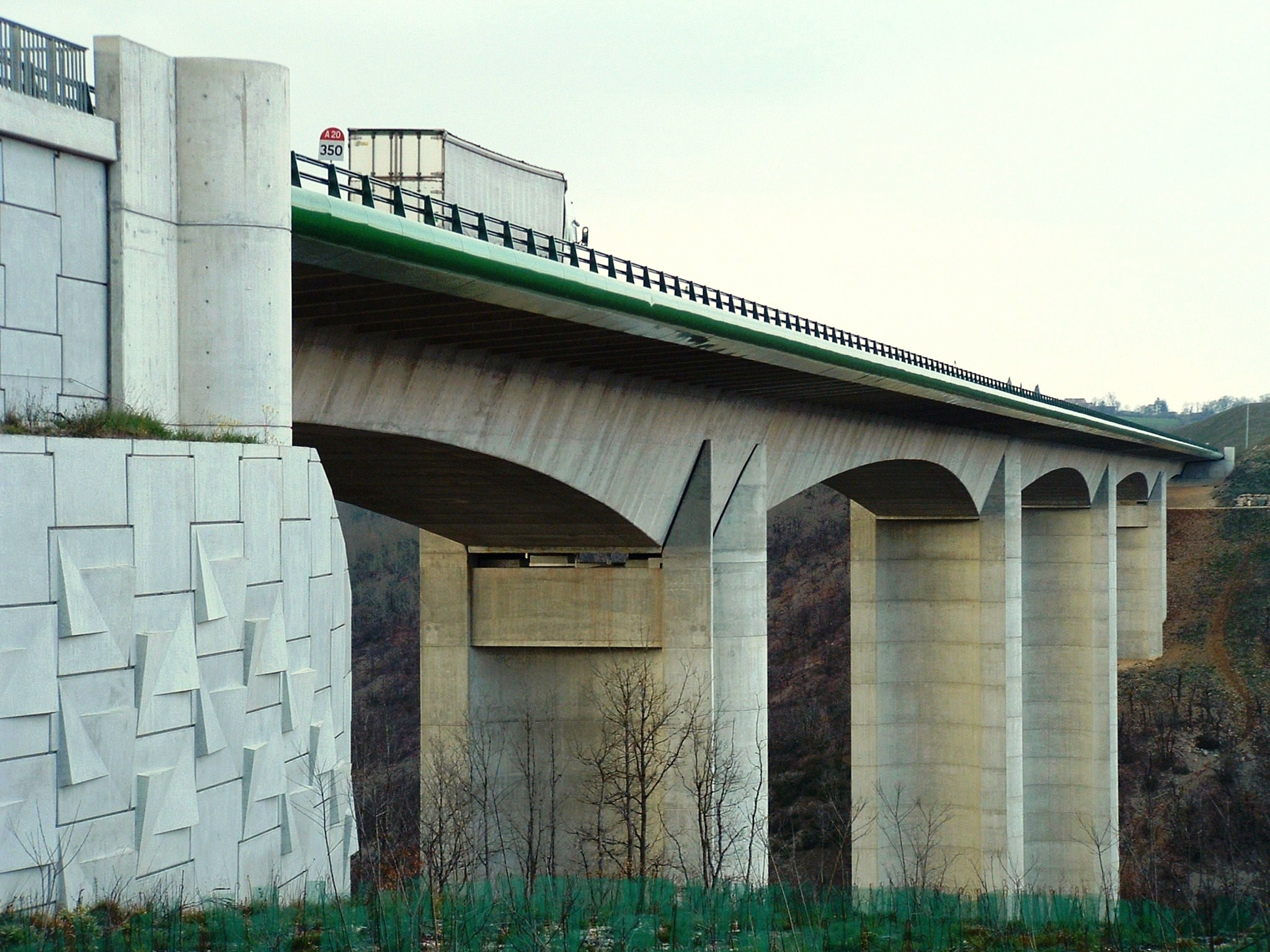

The Rauze Viaduct is a concrete box-girder bridge located in southern France, at around 330 ft high. The bridge can carry heavy vehicles and loads on the A20 autoroute. It crosses the specific River Rauze.

== History ==
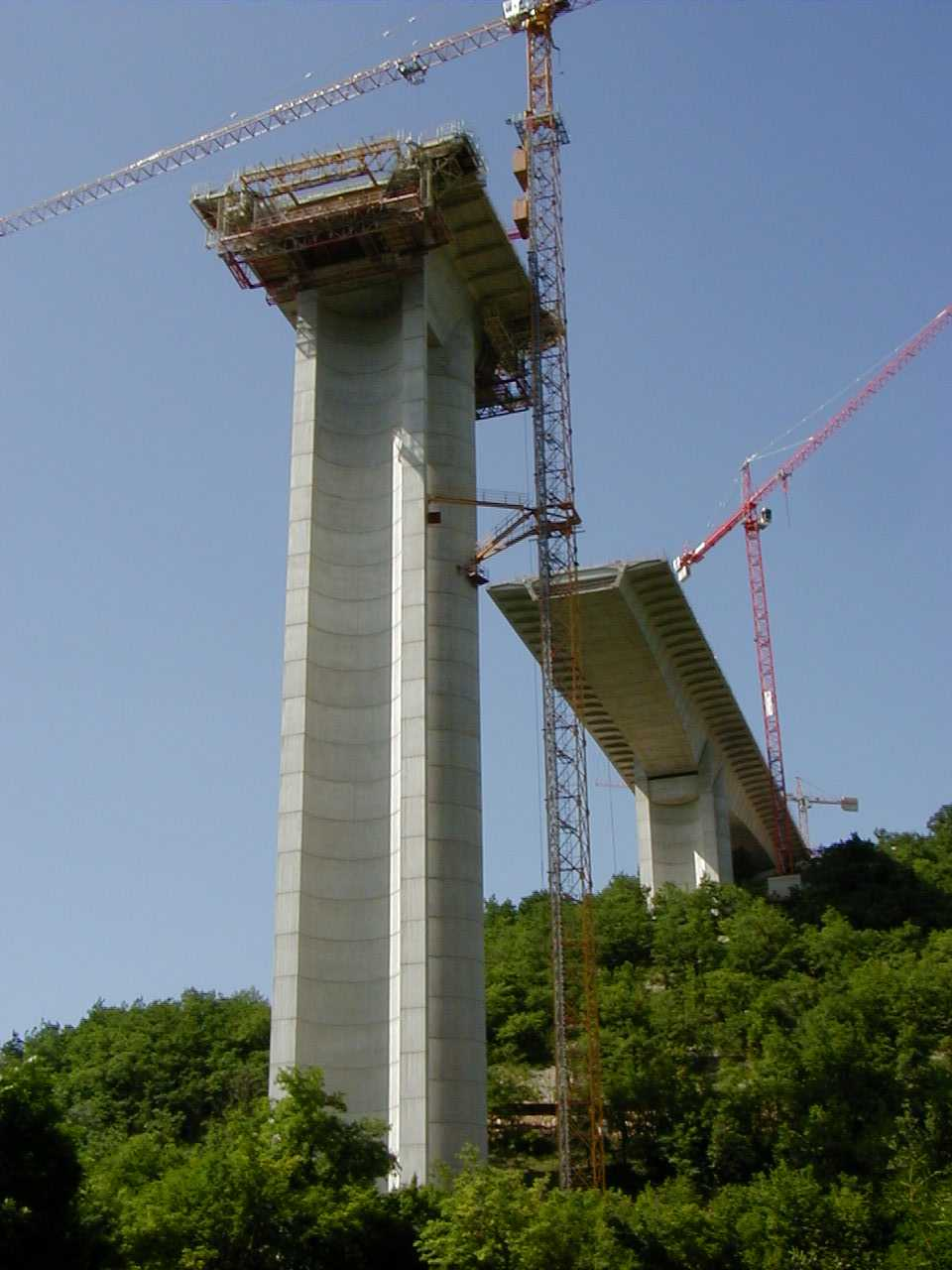
Construction in June 2000

=== Design ===
The structural engineering was by SECOA (Société d'étude et de calculs en ouvrages d'art). It is a haunched girder bridge. The area is designated under Natura 2000 as a natural fauna ecological area, so none of the piers could be put in the river. The three central spans are 130 m long, with the other outer spans being 91 m and 74 m long.

=== Construction ===
It was built by Dodin Campenon-Bernard, with the balanced cantilever method. Pre-stressing was by Spie Précontrainte (Spie Batignolles) of Cergy in Paris. 28,000 cubic metres of concrete were required; the limestone came from a quarry in Cahors. Steel fabrication was by SAMT of Saint-Chamas. The autoroute scheme was completed on 20 June 2001, and opened on 12 July 2001.

== Structure ==
It is in the Lot department in the Occitanie region, 5 km north-west of Cahors.

== See also ==
- Dordogne Viaduct, 1,070m long, also on the A20 autoroute, to the north
