= Lunegarde =

- Commune
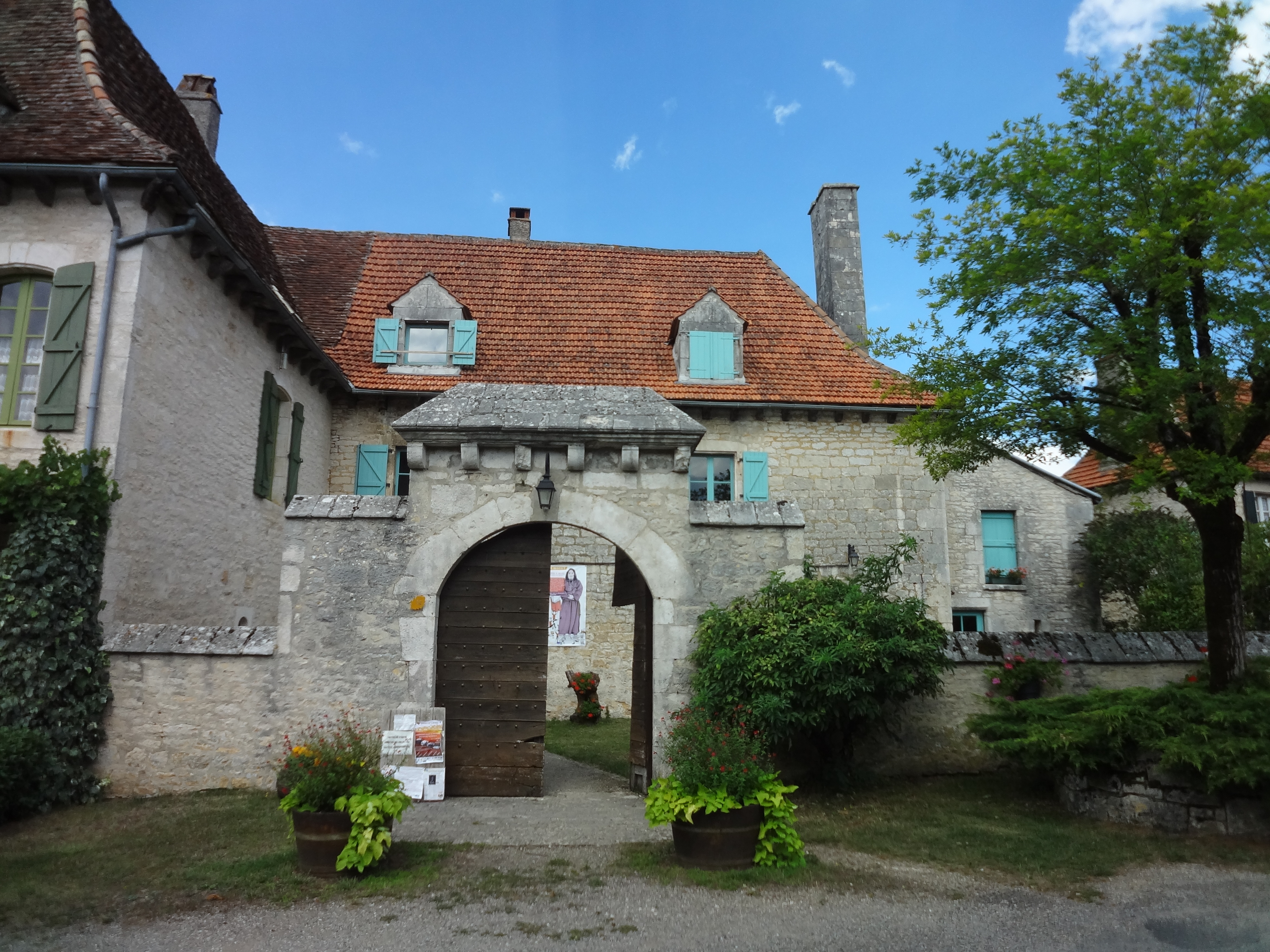
- The town hall in Lunegarde
- Location of Lunegarde
- Location within France Location within Occitanie
- Coordinates: 44°41′29″N 1°41′21″E
- Country: France
- Region: Occitania
- Department: Lot
- Arrondissement: Gourdon
- Canton: Causse et Vallées
- Intercommunality: Causse de Labastide-Murat

Government
  - Mayor (2020–2026): Marc Issaly
- Area^{1}: 10.43 km^{2} (4.03 sq mi)
- Elevation: 423 m (1,388 ft)
- Highest elevation: 422 m (1,385 ft)
- Lowest elevation: 329 m (1,079 ft)
- Population (2023): 94
  - Density: 9.0/km^{2} (23/sq mi)
- Time zone: UTC+01:00 (CET)
  - Summer (DST): UTC+02:00 (CEST)
- INSEE/Postal code: 46181 /46240
- ^{1} French Land Register data, which excludes lakes, ponds, glaciers > 1 km^{2} (0.386 sq mi or 247 acres) and river estuaries.

Lunegarde (French pronunciation: [lynɡaʁd]; Occitan: Lunagarda) is a commune in the Lot department in south-western France.

== See also ==
- Communes of the Lot department
