= Frontenac, Lot =

Frontenac
- Commune
- Location of Frontenac
- Location within France Location within Occitanie
- Coordinates: 44°32′25″N 1°58′20″E
- Country: France
- Region: Occitania
- Department: Lot
- Arrondissement: Figeac
- Canton: Causse et Vallées

Government
  - Mayor (2020–2026): François Beck
- Area^{1}: 2.84 km^{2} (1.10 sq mi)
- Elevation: 164 m (538 ft)
- Highest elevation: 370 m (1,210 ft)
- Lowest elevation: 150 m (490 ft)
- Population (2023): 67
  - Density: 24/km^{2} (61/sq mi)
- Time zone: UTC+01:00 (CET)
  - Summer (DST): UTC+02:00 (CEST)
- INSEE/Postal code: 46116 /46160
- ^{1} French Land Register data, which excludes lakes, ponds, glaciers > 1 km^{2} (0.386 sq mi or 247 acres) and river estuaries.

Frontenac (French pronunciation: [fʁɔ̃tnak]) is a commune in the Lot department in south-western France.

== See also ==
- Communes of the Lot department
