= Cras, Lot =

Cras
- Commune
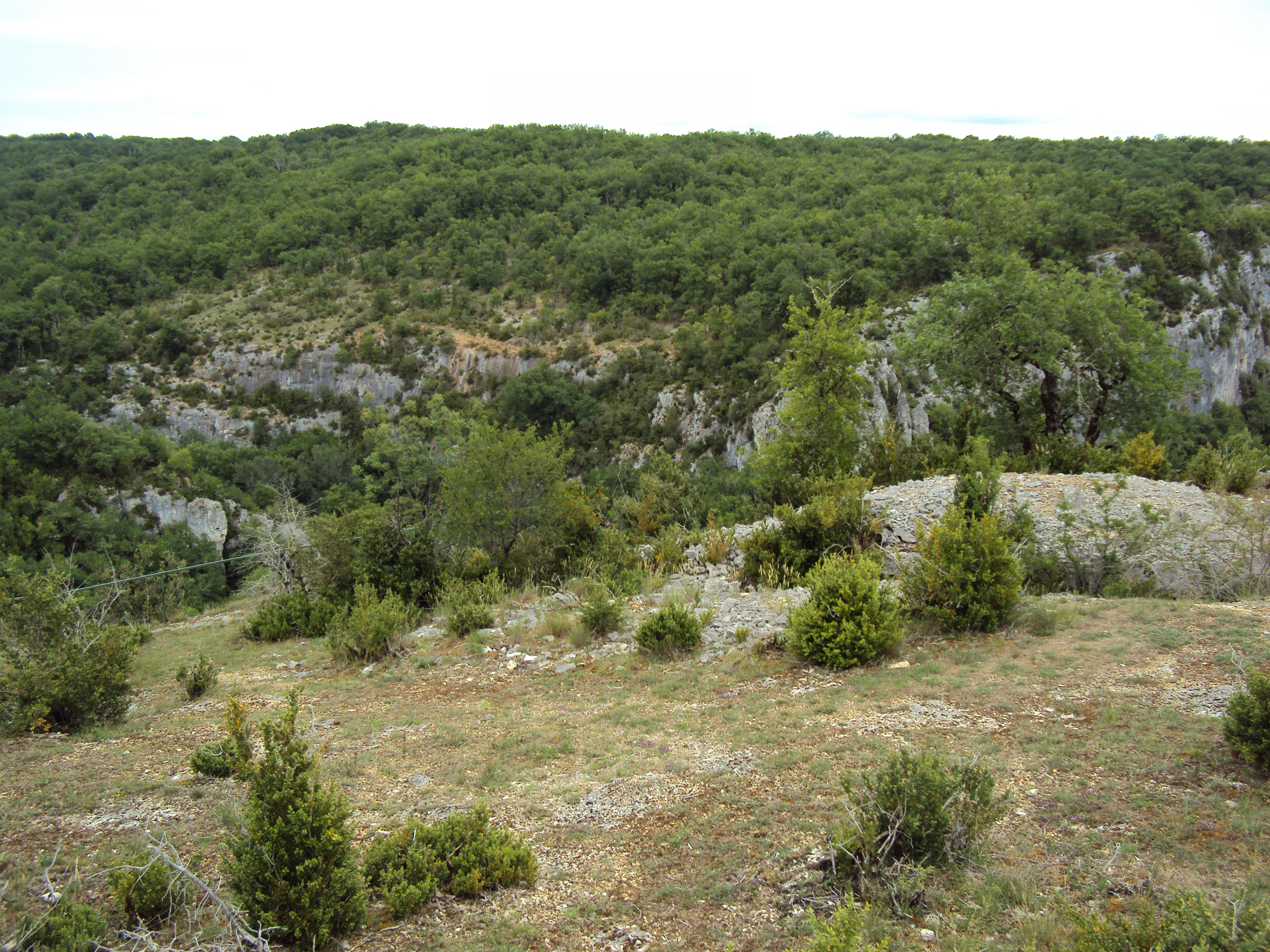
- On the site of the oppidum of Murcens
- Location of Cras
- Location within France Location within Occitanie
- Coordinates: 44°34′07″N 1°32′02″E
- Country: France
- Region: Occitania
- Department: Lot
- Arrondissement: Gourdon
- Canton: Causse et Vallées
- Intercommunality: Causse de Labastide-Murat

Government
  - Mayor (2020–2026): Michel Bonhomme
- Area^{1}: 10.22 km^{2} (3.95 sq mi)
- Elevation: 317 m (1,040 ft)
- Highest elevation: 383 m (1,257 ft)
- Lowest elevation: 170 m (560 ft)
- Population (2023): 97
  - Density: 9.5/km^{2} (25/sq mi)
- Time zone: UTC+01:00 (CET)
  - Summer (DST): UTC+02:00 (CEST)
- INSEE/Postal code: 46079 /46360
- ^{1} French Land Register data, which excludes lakes, ponds, glaciers > 1 km^{2} (0.386 sq mi or 247 acres) and river estuaries.

Cras (Occitan: Demà) is a commune in the Lot department in south-western France.

== See also ==
- Communes of the Lot department
