= Sabadel-Lauzès =

- Commune
- Location of Sabadel-Lauzès
- Location within France Location within Occitanie
- Coordinates: 44°34′05″N 1°36′14″E
- Country: France
- Region: Occitania
- Department: Lot
- Arrondissement: Gourdon
- Canton: Causse et Vallées
- Intercommunality: Causse de Labastide-Murat

Government
  - Mayor (2022–2026): Lionel Carrieres
- Area^{1}: 8.79 km^{2} (3.39 sq mi)
- Elevation: 282 m (925 ft)
- Highest elevation: 357 m (1,171 ft)
- Lowest elevation: 198 m (650 ft)
- Population (2023): 91
  - Density: 10/km^{2} (27/sq mi)
- Time zone: UTC+01:00 (CET)
  - Summer (DST): UTC+02:00 (CEST)
- INSEE/Postal code: 46245 /46360
- ^{1} French Land Register data, which excludes lakes, ponds, glaciers > 1 km^{2} (0.386 sq mi or 247 acres) and river estuaries.

Sabadel-Lauzès (French pronunciation: [sabadɛl lozɛs]; Occitan: Sabadèl) is a commune in the Lot department in south-western France.

== Population ==
Historical population
Year	Pop.	±% p.a.
1968	115	—
1975	135	+2.32%
1982	138	+0.31%
1990	116	−2.15%
1999	114	−0.19%
2007	97	−2.00%
2012	89	−1.71%
2017	79	−2.36%
2023	91	+2.38%
Source: INSEE

== See also ==
- Communes of the Lot department
