= Blars =

- Commune
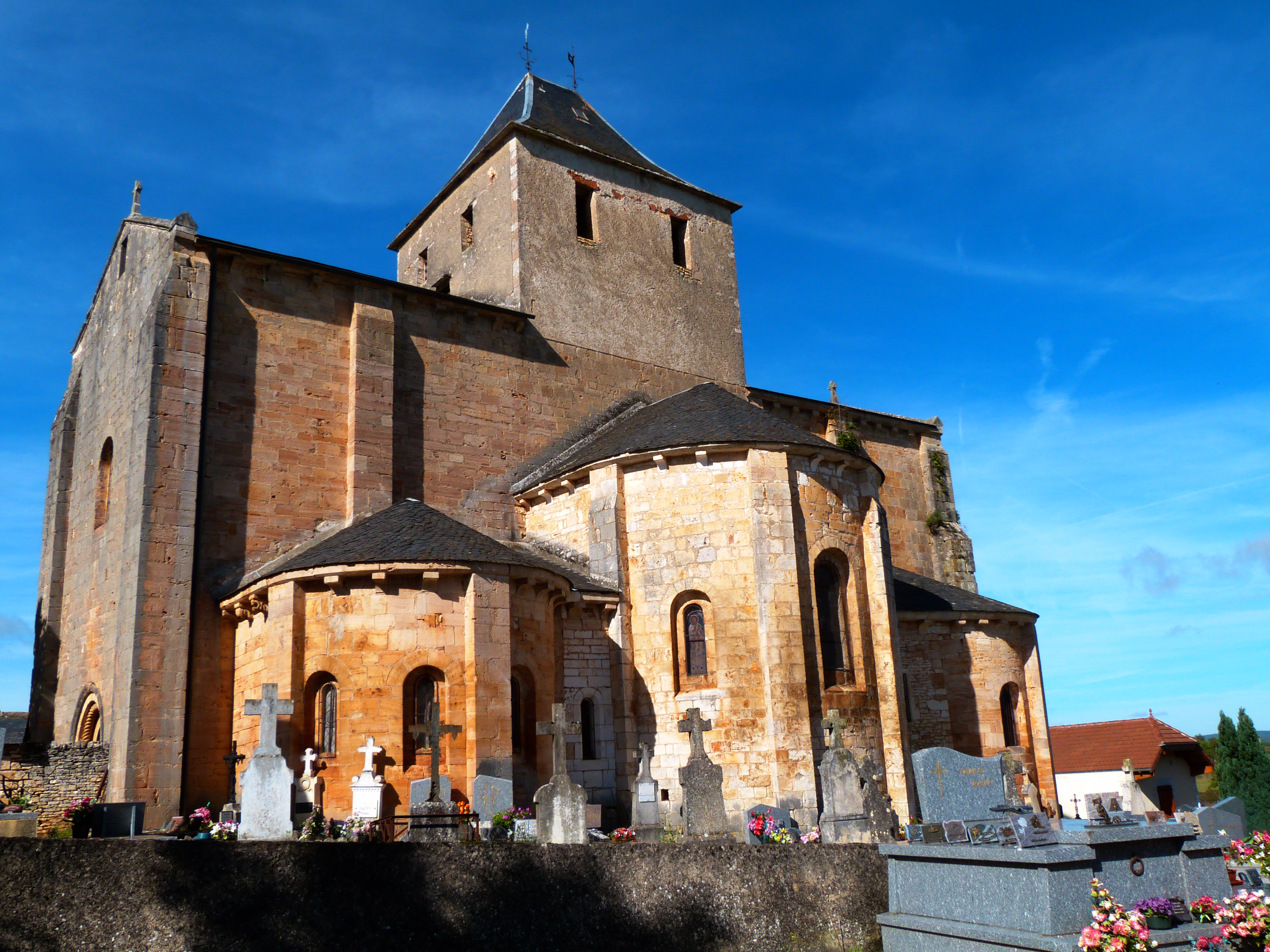
- The church in Blars

- Coat of arms
- Location of Blars
- Location within France Location within Occitanie
- Coordinates: 44°34′01″N 1°43′14″E
- Country: France
- Region: Occitania
- Department: Lot
- Arrondissement: Gourdon
- Canton: Causse et Vallées
- Intercommunality: Causse de Labastide-Murat

Government
  - Mayor (2020–2026): Jean-Louis Poujade
- Area^{1}: 25.68 km^{2} (9.92 sq mi)
- Elevation: 355 m (1,165 ft)
- Highest elevation: 380 m (1,250 ft)
- Lowest elevation: 200 m (660 ft)
- Population (2023): 137
  - Density: 5.33/km^{2} (13.8/sq mi)
- Time zone: UTC+01:00 (CET)
  - Summer (DST): UTC+02:00 (CEST)
- INSEE/Postal code: 46031 /46330
- ^{1} French Land Register data, which excludes lakes, ponds, glaciers > 1 km^{2} (0.386 sq mi or 247 acres) and river estuaries.

Blars is a commune in the Lot department in southwestern France.

== Population ==
Historical population
Year	Pop.	±% p.a.
1968	144	—
1975	134	−1.02%
1982	131	−0.32%
1990	138	+0.65%
1999	117	−1.82%
2007	127	+1.03%
2012	129	+0.31%
2017	138	+1.36%
2023	137	−0.12%
Source: INSEE

== See also ==
- Communes of the Lot department
