= Gréalou =

- Commune
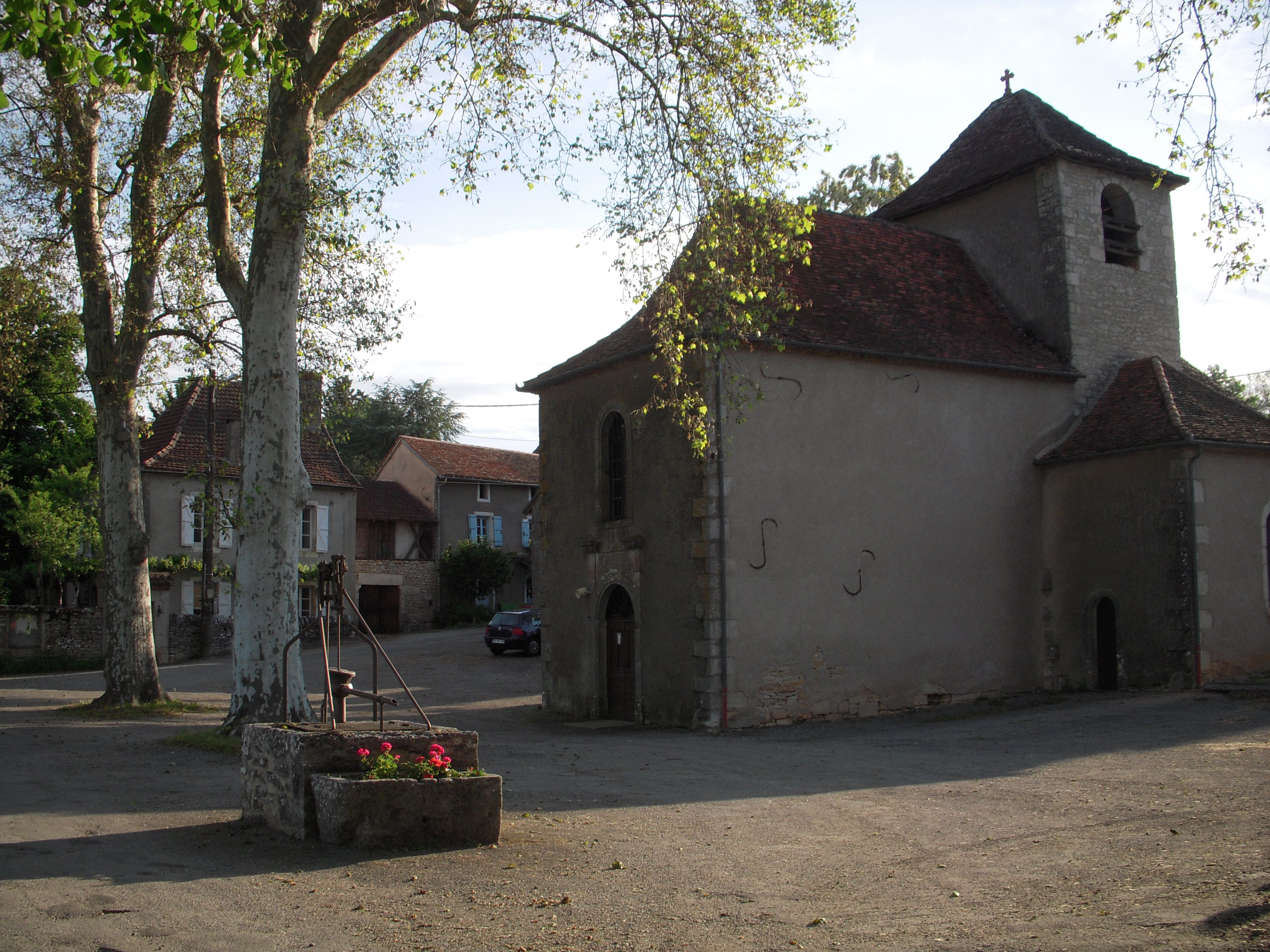
- Gréalou's church

- Coat of arms
- Location of Gréalou
- Location within France Location within Occitanie
- Coordinates: 44°32′15″N 1°53′18″E
- Country: France
- Region: Occitania
- Department: Lot
- Arrondissement: Figeac
- Canton: Causse et Vallées

Government
  - Mayor (2020–2026): Michel Vedrune
- Area^{1}: 17.5 km^{2} (6.8 sq mi)
- Elevation: 391 m (1,283 ft)
- Highest elevation: 402 m (1,319 ft)
- Lowest elevation: 197 m (646 ft)
- Population (2023): 312
  - Density: 17.8/km^{2} (46.2/sq mi)
- Time zone: UTC+01:00 (CET)
  - Summer (DST): UTC+02:00 (CEST)
- INSEE/Postal code: 46129 /46160
- ^{1} French Land Register data, which excludes lakes, ponds, glaciers > 1 km^{2} (0.386 sq mi or 247 acres) and river estuaries.

Gréalou (French pronunciation: [ɡʁealu]; Occitan: Grialon) is a commune in the Lot department in south-western France.

== See also ==
- Communes of the Lot department
