= Lentillac-du-Causse =

- Commune
- Coat of arms
- Location of Lentillac-du-Causse
- Location within France Location within Occitanie
- Coordinates: 44°33′47″N 1°38′24″E
- Country: France
- Region: Occitania
- Department: Lot
- Arrondissement: Gourdon
- Canton: Causse et Vallées
- Intercommunality: Causse de Labastide-Murat

Government
  - Mayor (2020–2026): Françoise Lapergue
- Area^{1}: 13.68 km^{2} (5.28 sq mi)
- Elevation: 315 m (1,033 ft)
- Highest elevation: 353 m (1,158 ft)
- Lowest elevation: 160 m (520 ft)
- Population (2023): 107
  - Density: 7.82/km^{2} (20.3/sq mi)
- Time zone: UTC+01:00 (CET)
  - Summer (DST): UTC+02:00 (CEST)
- INSEE/Postal code: 46167 /46330
- ^{1} French Land Register data, which excludes lakes, ponds, glaciers > 1 km^{2} (0.386 sq mi or 247 acres) and river estuaries.

Lentillac-du-Causse (French pronunciation: [lɑ̃tijak dy kos]; Occitan: Lentilhac del Causse, before 1997: Lentillac-Lauzès) is a commune in the Lot department in south-western France.

== See also ==
- Communes of the Lot department
