= Soulomès =

- Commune
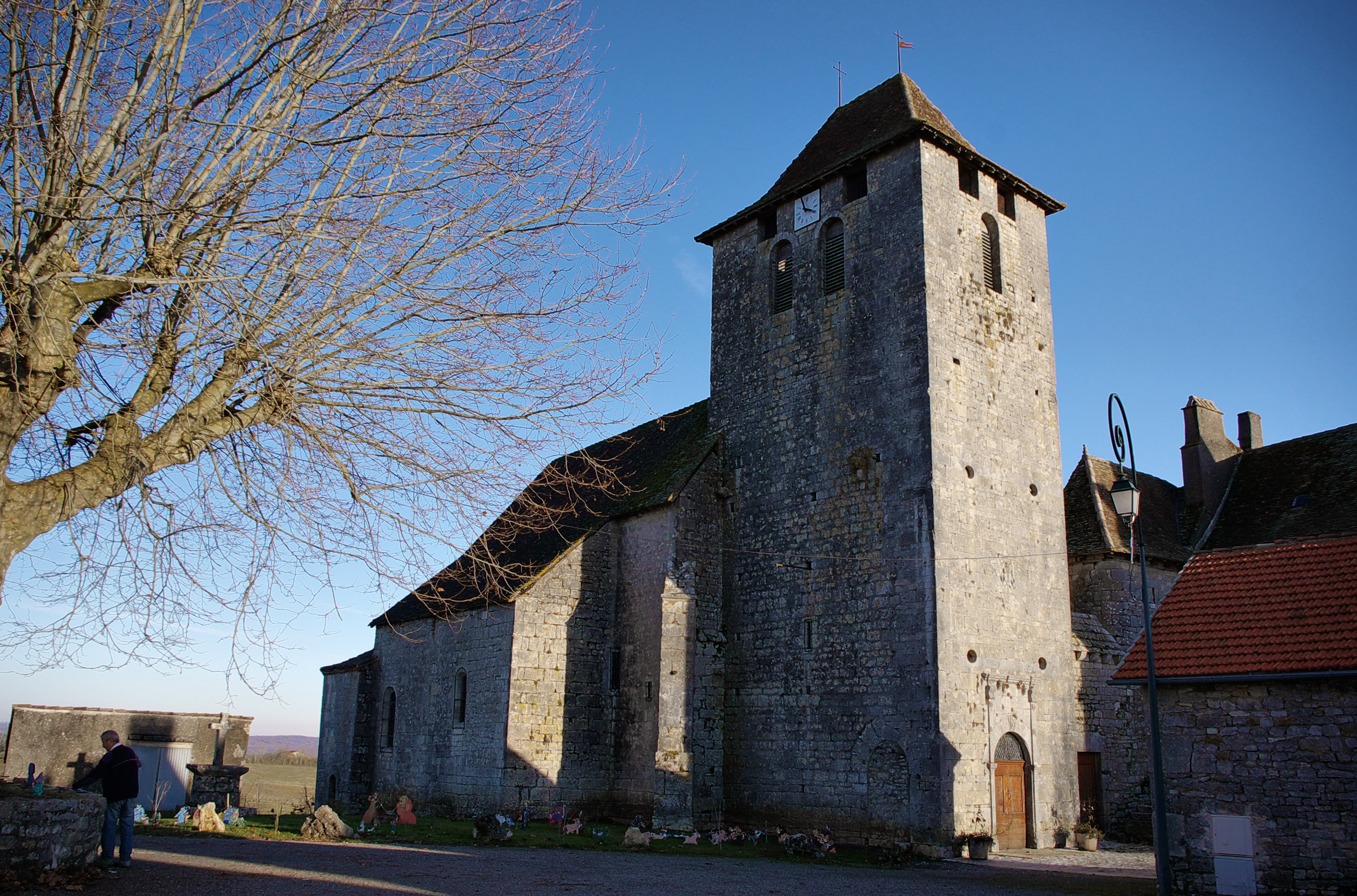
- The church of Sainte-Marie-Madeleine
- Location of Soulomès
- Location within France Location within Occitanie
- Coordinates: 44°38′01″N 1°35′41″E
- Country: France
- Region: Occitania
- Department: Lot
- Arrondissement: Gourdon
- Canton: Causse et Vallées
- Intercommunality: CC Causse de Labastide-Murat

Government
  - Mayor (2020–2026): Christian Pons
- Area^{1}: 7.67 km^{2} (2.96 sq mi)
- Elevation: 440 m (1,440 ft)
- Highest elevation: 450 m (1,480 ft)
- Lowest elevation: 271 m (889 ft)
- Population (2023): 131
  - Density: 17.1/km^{2} (44.2/sq mi)
- Time zone: UTC+01:00 (CET)
  - Summer (DST): UTC+02:00 (CEST)
- INSEE/Postal code: 46310 /46240
- ^{1} French Land Register data, which excludes lakes, ponds, glaciers > 1 km^{2} (0.386 sq mi or 247 acres) and river estuaries.

Soulomès is a commune in the Lot department in south-western France.

== See also ==
- Communes of the Lot department
