= Grèzes, Lot =

Grèzes
- Commune
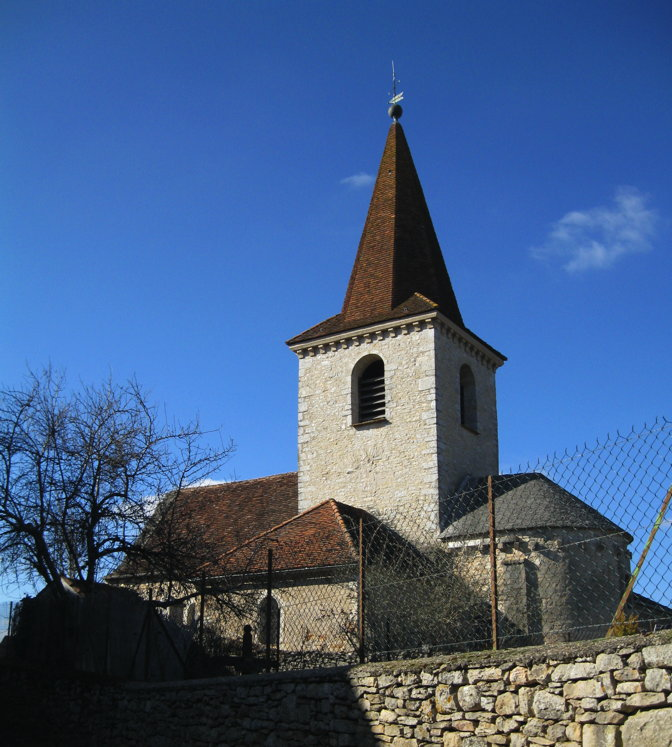
- The church in Grèzes
- Location of Grèzes
- Location within France Location within Occitanie
- Coordinates: 44°37′42″N 1°49′15″E
- Country: France
- Region: Occitania
- Department: Lot
- Arrondissement: Figeac
- Canton: Causse et Vallées
- Intercommunality: CC Grand-Figeac

Government
  - Mayor (2020–2026): Céline Marinho
- Area^{1}: 11.02 km^{2} (4.25 sq mi)
- Elevation: 300 m (980 ft)
- Highest elevation: 443 m (1,453 ft)
- Lowest elevation: 268 m (879 ft)
- Population (2023): 155
  - Density: 14.1/km^{2} (36.4/sq mi)
- Time zone: UTC+01:00 (CET)
  - Summer (DST): UTC+02:00 (CEST)
- INSEE/Postal code: 46131 /46320
- ^{1} French Land Register data, which excludes lakes, ponds, glaciers > 1 km^{2} (0.386 sq mi or 247 acres) and river estuaries.

Grèzes (French pronunciation: [ɡʁɛz]; Occitan: Gresas) is a commune in the Lot department in south-western France.

== See also ==
- Communes of the Lot department
