= Caniac-du-Causse =

- Commune
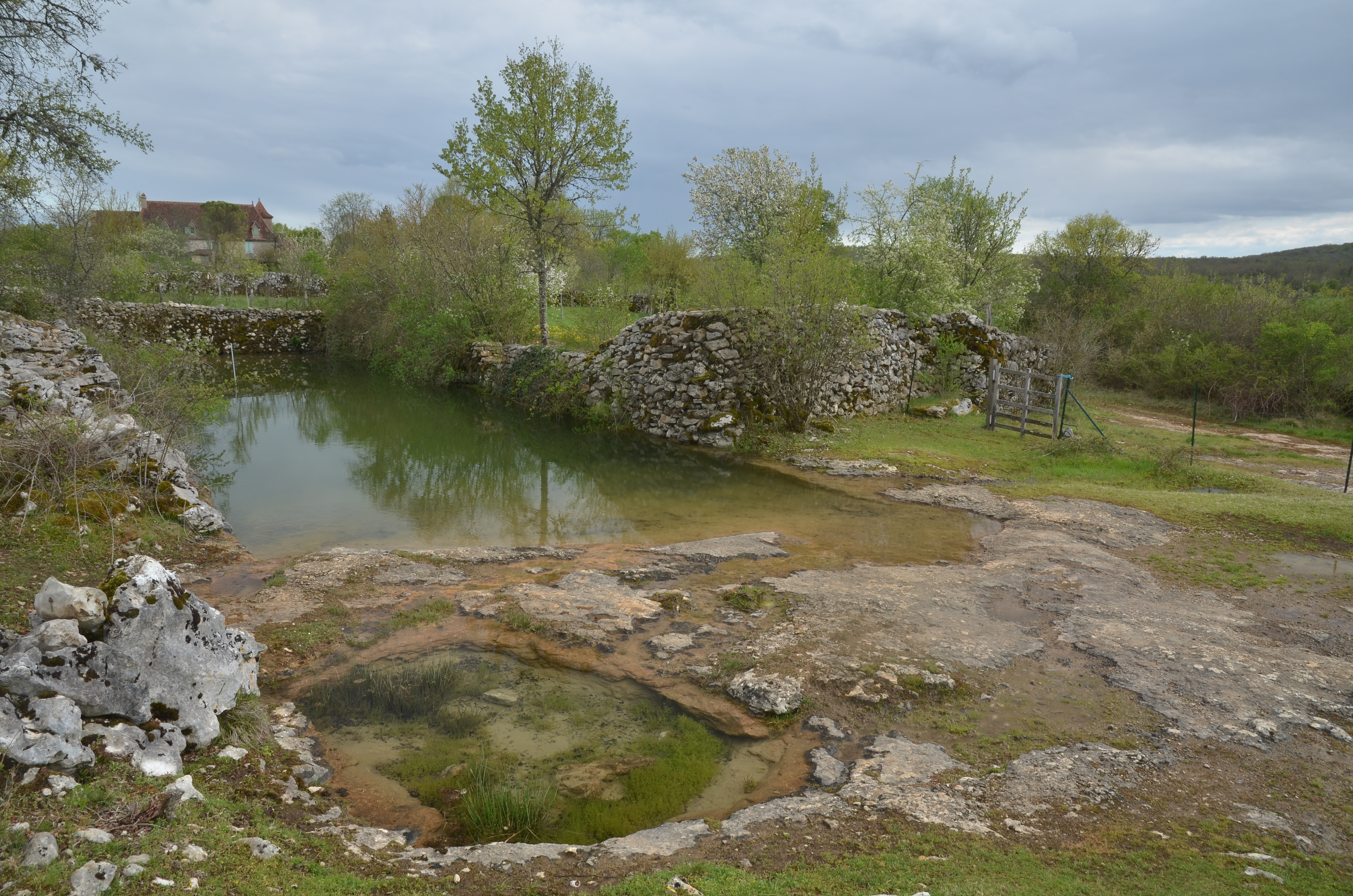
- Saint-Namphase Lake
- Location of Caniac-du-Causse
- Location within France Location within Occitanie
- Coordinates: 44°37′20″N 1°38′38″E
- Country: France
- Region: Occitania
- Department: Lot
- Arrondissement: Gourdon
- Canton: Causse et Vallées
- Intercommunality: CC Causse de Labastide-Murat

Government
  - Mayor (2020–2026): Jean-Pierre Sabrazat
- Area^{1}: 35 km^{2} (14 sq mi)
- Elevation: 350 m (1,150 ft)
- Highest elevation: 465 m (1,526 ft)
- Lowest elevation: 309 m (1,014 ft)
- Population (2023): 371
  - Density: 11/km^{2} (27/sq mi)
- Time zone: UTC+01:00 (CET)
  - Summer (DST): UTC+02:00 (CEST)
- INSEE/Postal code: 46054 /46240
- ^{1} French Land Register data, which excludes lakes, ponds, glaciers > 1 km^{2} (0.386 sq mi or 247 acres) and river estuaries.

Caniac-du-Causse (French pronunciation: [kanjak dy kos], literally Caniac of the Causse; Occitan: Canhac del Causse) is a commune in the Lot department in south-western France.

== See also ==
- Communes of the Lot department
