= Sauliac-sur-Célé =

- Commune
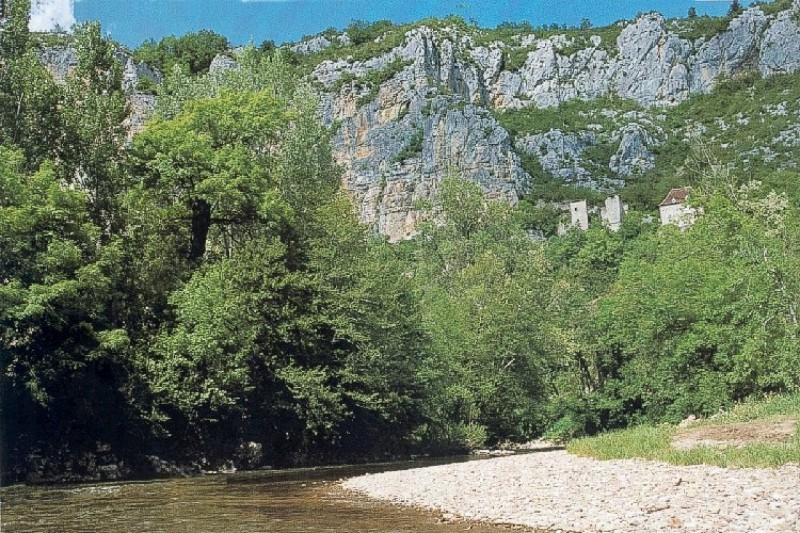
- Sauliac-sur-Célé
- Location of Sauliac-sur-Célé
- Location within France Location within Occitanie
- Coordinates: 44°31′05″N 1°43′22″E
- Country: France
- Region: Occitania
- Department: Lot
- Arrondissement: Cahors
- Canton: Causse et Vallées
- Intercommunality: CC Grand-Figeac

Government
  - Mayor (2020–2026): Daniel Bancel
- Area^{1}: 25.13 km^{2} (9.70 sq mi)
- Highest elevation: 379 m (1,243 ft)
- Lowest elevation: 130 m (430 ft)
- Population (2023): 114
  - Density: 4.54/km^{2} (11.7/sq mi)
- Time zone: UTC+01:00 (CET)
  - Summer (DST): UTC+02:00 (CEST)
- INSEE/Postal code: 46299 /46330
- ^{1} French Land Register data, which excludes lakes, ponds, glaciers > 1 km^{2} (0.386 sq mi or 247 acres) and river estuaries.

Sauliac-sur-Célé (French pronunciation: [soljak syʁ sele], literally Sauliac on Célé; Occitan: Sauliac) is a commune in the Lot department in south-western France.

== See also ==
- Communes of the Lot department
