= Larnagol =

- Commune
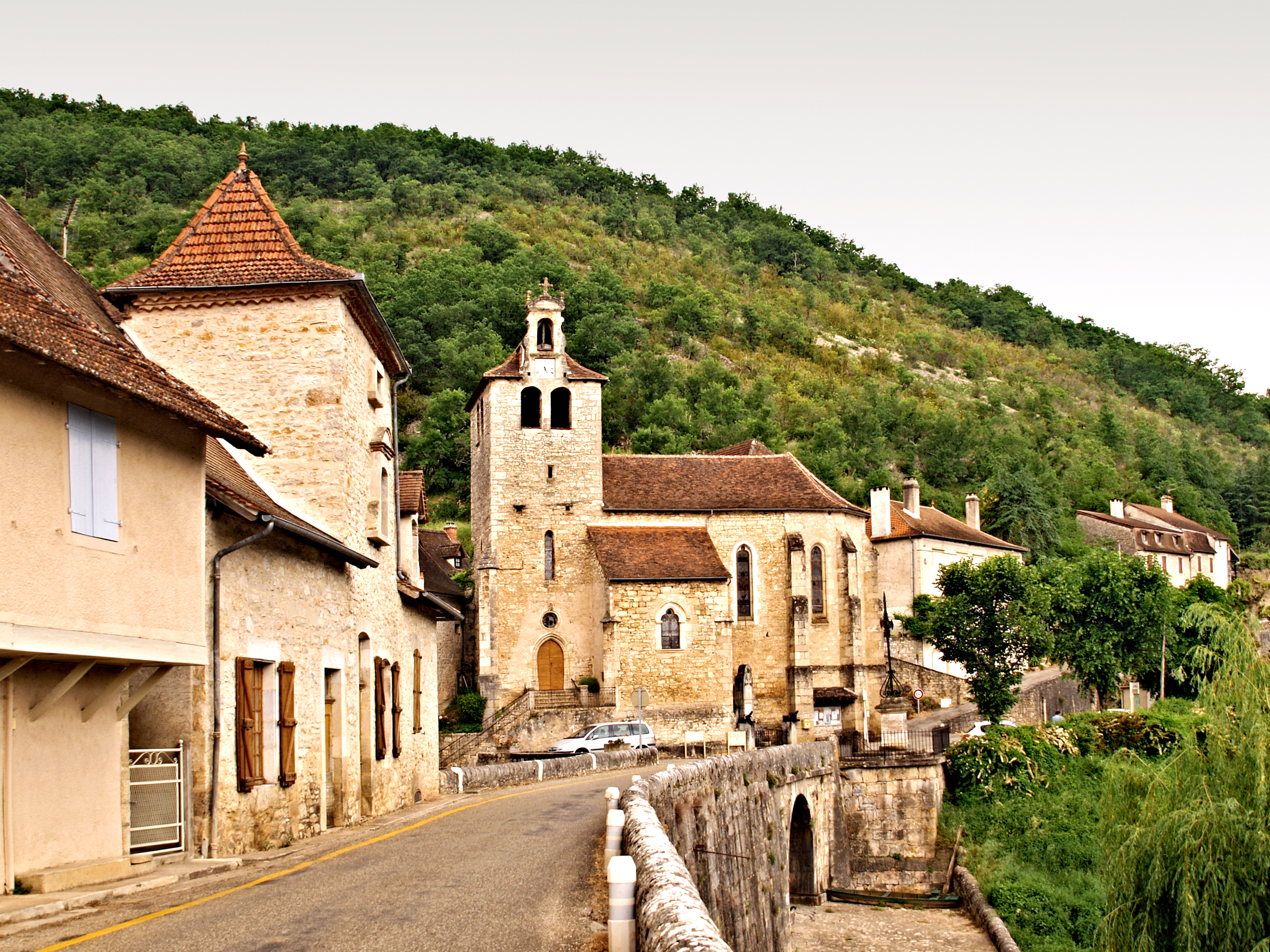
- The church in Larnagol
- Location of Larnagol
- Location within France Location within Occitanie
- Coordinates: 44°28′38″N 1°46′42″E
- Country: France
- Region: Occitania
- Department: Lot
- Arrondissement: Figeac
- Canton: Causse et Vallées
- Intercommunality: Grand-Figeac

Government
  - Mayor (2020–2026): André Ortalo-Magne
- Area^{1}: 24.36 km^{2} (9.41 sq mi)
- Elevation: 146 m (479 ft)
- Highest elevation: 385 m (1,263 ft)
- Lowest elevation: 130 m (430 ft)
- Population (2023): 135
  - Density: 5.54/km^{2} (14.4/sq mi)
- Time zone: UTC+01:00 (CET)
  - Summer (DST): UTC+02:00 (CEST)
- INSEE/Postal code: 46155 /46160
- ^{1} French Land Register data, which excludes lakes, ponds, glaciers > 1 km^{2} (0.386 sq mi or 247 acres) and river estuaries.

Larnagol (French pronunciation: [laʁnaɡɔl]; Languedocien: Larnagòl) is a commune in the Lot department in south-western France.

== See also ==
- Communes of the Lot department
