= Berganty =

- Commune
- Location of Berganty
- Location within France Location within Occitanie
- Coordinates: 44°26′40″N 1°38′51″E
- Country: France
- Region: Occitania
- Department: Lot
- Arrondissement: Cahors
- Canton: Causse et Vallées

Government
  - Mayor (2020–2026): Christian David
- Area^{1}: 6.98 km^{2} (2.69 sq mi)
- Elevation: 300 m (980 ft)
- Highest elevation: 377 m (1,237 ft)
- Lowest elevation: 274 m (899 ft)
- Population (2023): 146
  - Density: 20.9/km^{2} (54.2/sq mi)
- Time zone: UTC+01:00 (CET)
  - Summer (DST): UTC+02:00 (CEST)
- INSEE/Postal code: 46027 /46090
- ^{1} French Land Register data, which excludes lakes, ponds, glaciers > 1 km^{2} (0.386 sq mi or 247 acres) and river estuaries.

Berganty (French pronunciation: [bɛʁɡɑ̃ti]; Occitan: Bergantin) is a commune in the Lot department in southwestern France.

== Population ==
Historical population
Year	Pop.	±% p.a.
1968	98	—
1975	127	+3.77%
1982	112	−1.78%
1990	74	−5.05%
1999	92	+2.45%
2007	96	+0.53%
2012	110	+2.76%
2017	116	+1.07%
2023	146	+3.91%
Source: INSEE

== See also ==
- Communes of the Lot department
