= Puyjourdes =

- Commune
- Coat of arms
- Location of Puyjourdes
- Location within France Location within Occitanie
- Coordinates: 44°24′30″N 1°51′41″E
- Country: France
- Region: Occitania
- Department: Lot
- Arrondissement: Figeac
- Canton: Causse et Vallées
- Intercommunality: CC Grand-Figeac

Government
  - Mayor (2020–2026): Dominique Gendras
- Area^{1}: 7.83 km^{2} (3.02 sq mi)
- Elevation: 330 m (1,080 ft)
- Highest elevation: 401 m (1,316 ft)
- Lowest elevation: 251 m (823 ft)
- Population (2023): 88
  - Density: 11/km^{2} (29/sq mi)
- Time zone: UTC+01:00 (CET)
  - Summer (DST): UTC+02:00 (CEST)
- INSEE/Postal code: 46230 /46260
- ^{1} French Land Register data, which excludes lakes, ponds, glaciers > 1 km^{2} (0.386 sq mi or 247 acres) and river estuaries.

Puyjourdes (French pronunciation: [pɥiʒuʁd]; Occitan: Puègjorda) is a commune in the Lot department in south-western France.

== See also ==
- Communes of the Lot department
