= Cadrieu =

- Commune
- Location of Cadrieu
- Location within France Location within Occitanie
- Coordinates: 44°29′34″N 1°52′50″E
- Country: France
- Region: Occitania
- Department: Lot
- Arrondissement: Figeac
- Canton: Causse et Vallées
- Intercommunality: CC Grand-Figeac

Government
  - Mayor (2020–2026): Christiane Duponchelle
- Area^{1}: 5.24 km^{2} (2.02 sq mi)
- Elevation: 150 m (490 ft)
- Highest elevation: 394 m (1,293 ft)
- Lowest elevation: 140 m (460 ft)
- Population (2023): 174
  - Density: 33.2/km^{2} (86.0/sq mi)
- Time zone: UTC+01:00 (CET)
  - Summer (DST): UTC+02:00 (CEST)
- INSEE/Postal code: 46041 /46160
- ^{1} French Land Register data, which excludes lakes, ponds, glaciers > 1 km^{2} (0.386 sq mi or 247 acres) and river estuaries.

Cadrieu (French pronunciation: [kadʁijø]; Occitan: Cadriu) is a commune in the Lot department in south-western France. It is around 25 km east of Cahors.

== See also ==
- Communes of the Lot department
