= Crégols =

- Commune
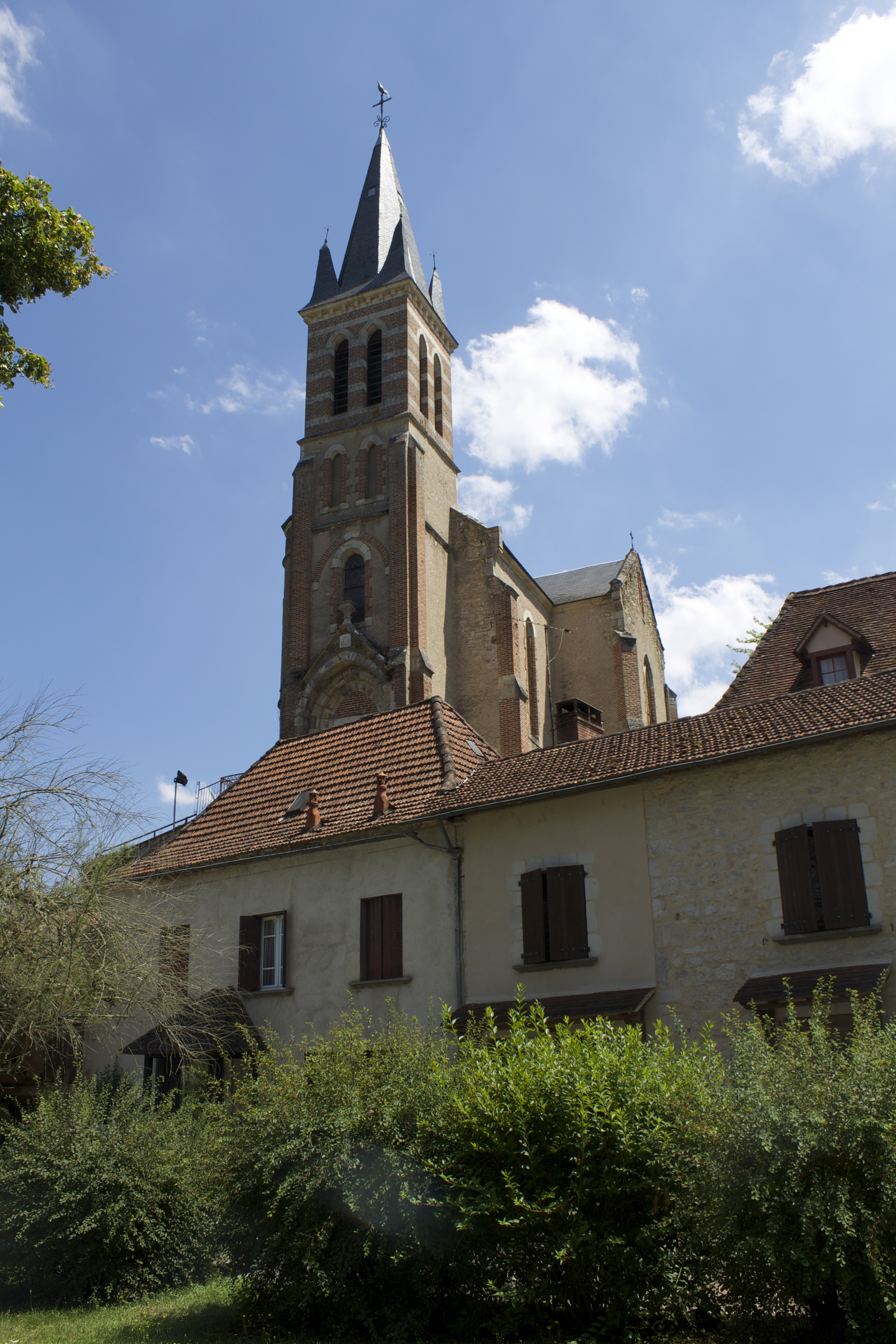
- Location of Crégols
- Location within France Location within Occitanie
- Coordinates: 44°27′25″N 1°42′06″E
- Country: France
- Region: Occitania
- Department: Lot
- Arrondissement: Cahors
- Canton: Causse et Vallées
- Intercommunality: Pays de Lalbenque-Limogne

Government
  - Mayor (2020–2026): Didier Pech
- Area^{1}: 18.35 km^{2} (7.08 sq mi)
- Elevation: 156 m (512 ft)
- Highest elevation: 368 m (1,207 ft)
- Lowest elevation: 129 m (423 ft)
- Population (2023): 87
  - Density: 4.7/km^{2} (12/sq mi)
- Time zone: UTC+01:00 (CET)
  - Summer (DST): UTC+02:00 (CEST)
- INSEE/Postal code: 46081 /46330
- ^{1} French Land Register data, which excludes lakes, ponds, glaciers > 1 km^{2} (0.386 sq mi or 247 acres) and river estuaries.

Crégols (French pronunciation: [kʁeɡɔl]; Occitan: Cregòls) is a commune in the Lot department in south-western France.

== See also ==
- Communes of the Lot department
