= Tour-de-Faure =

- Commune
- Location of Tour-de-Faure
- Location within France Location within Occitanie
- Coordinates: 44°28′04″N 1°41′40″E
- Country: France
- Region: Occitania
- Department: Lot
- Arrondissement: Cahors
- Canton: Causse et Vallées
- Intercommunality: CA Grand Cahors

Government
  - Mayor (2020–2026): Patrick Teyssédre
- Area^{1}: 8.77 km^{2} (3.39 sq mi)
- Elevation: 137 m (449 ft)
- Highest elevation: 375 m (1,230 ft)
- Lowest elevation: 127 m (417 ft)
- Population (2023): 342
  - Density: 39.0/km^{2} (101/sq mi)
- Time zone: UTC+01:00 (CET)
  - Summer (DST): UTC+02:00 (CEST)
- INSEE/Postal code: 46320 /46330
- ^{1} French Land Register data, which excludes lakes, ponds, glaciers > 1 km^{2} (0.386 sq mi or 247 acres) and river estuaries.

Tour-de-Faure (French pronunciation: [tuʁ də fɔʁ]; Occitan: Torre-de-Faure) is a commune in the Lot department in south-western France.

== See also ==
- Communes of the Lot department
