= Saint-Pierre-Toirac =

- Commune
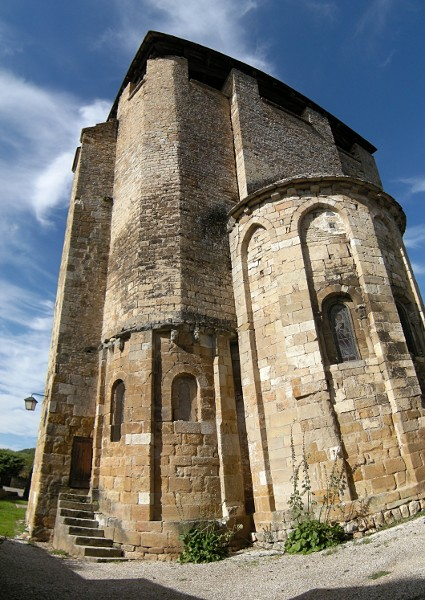
- The church in Saint-Pierre-Toirac
- Location of Saint-Pierre-Toirac
- Location within France Location within Occitanie
- Coordinates: 44°31′42″N 1°57′17″E
- Country: France
- Region: Occitania
- Department: Lot
- Arrondissement: Figeac
- Canton: Causse et Vallées
- Intercommunality: CC Grand-Figeac

Government
  - Mayor (2020–2026): Fernand Tapie
- Area^{1}: 5.83 km^{2} (2.25 sq mi)
- Elevation: 180 m (590 ft)
- Highest elevation: 375 m (1,230 ft)
- Lowest elevation: 153 m (502 ft)
- Population (2023): 165
  - Density: 28.3/km^{2} (73.3/sq mi)
- Time zone: UTC+01:00 (CET)
  - Summer (DST): UTC+02:00 (CEST)
- INSEE/Postal code: 46289 /46160
- ^{1} French Land Register data, which excludes lakes, ponds, glaciers > 1 km^{2} (0.386 sq mi or 247 acres) and river estuaries.

Saint-Pierre-Toirac (French pronunciation: [sɛ̃ pjɛʁ twaʁak]; Languedocien: Sant Pèire de Toirac) is a commune in the Lot department in south-western France.

== See also ==
- Communes of the Lot department
