= Espagnac-Sainte-Eulalie =

- Commune
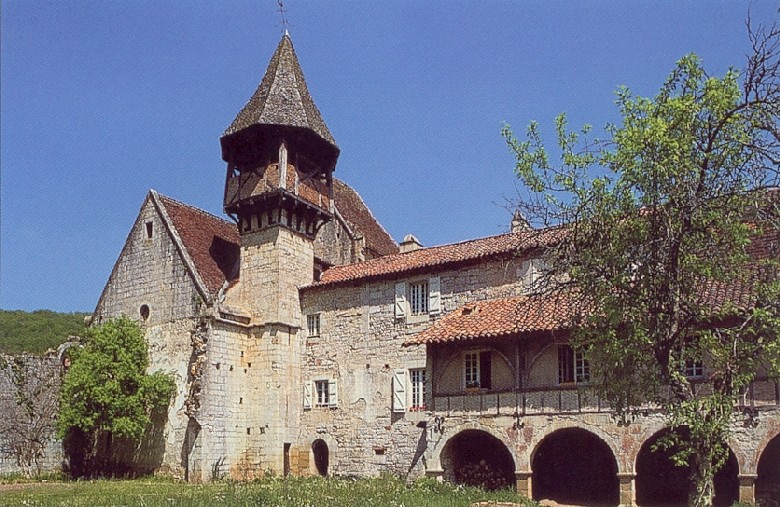
- The abbey in Espagnac-Sainte-Eulalie
- Location of Espagnac-Sainte-Eulalie
- Location within France Location within Occitanie
- Coordinates: 44°35′36″N 1°50′28″E
- Country: France
- Region: Occitania
- Department: Lot
- Arrondissement: Figeac
- Canton: Causse et Vallées
- Intercommunality: CC Grand-Figeac

Government
  - Mayor (2020–2026): Martine Benet-Bagreaux
- Area^{1}: 9.75 km^{2} (3.76 sq mi)
- Highest elevation: 426 m (1,398 ft)
- Lowest elevation: 161 m (528 ft)
- Population (2023): 97
  - Density: 9.9/km^{2} (26/sq mi)
- Demonym: Espagnaquois
- Time zone: UTC+01:00 (CET)
  - Summer (DST): UTC+02:00 (CEST)
- INSEE/Postal code: 46093 /46320
- ^{1} French Land Register data, which excludes lakes, ponds, glaciers > 1 km^{2} (0.386 sq mi or 247 acres) and river estuaries.

Espagnac-Sainte-Eulalie (Languedocien: Espanhac e Senta Auglari) is a commune in the Lot department in south-western France.

== See also ==
- Communes of the Lot department
