= Saint-Chels =

- Commune
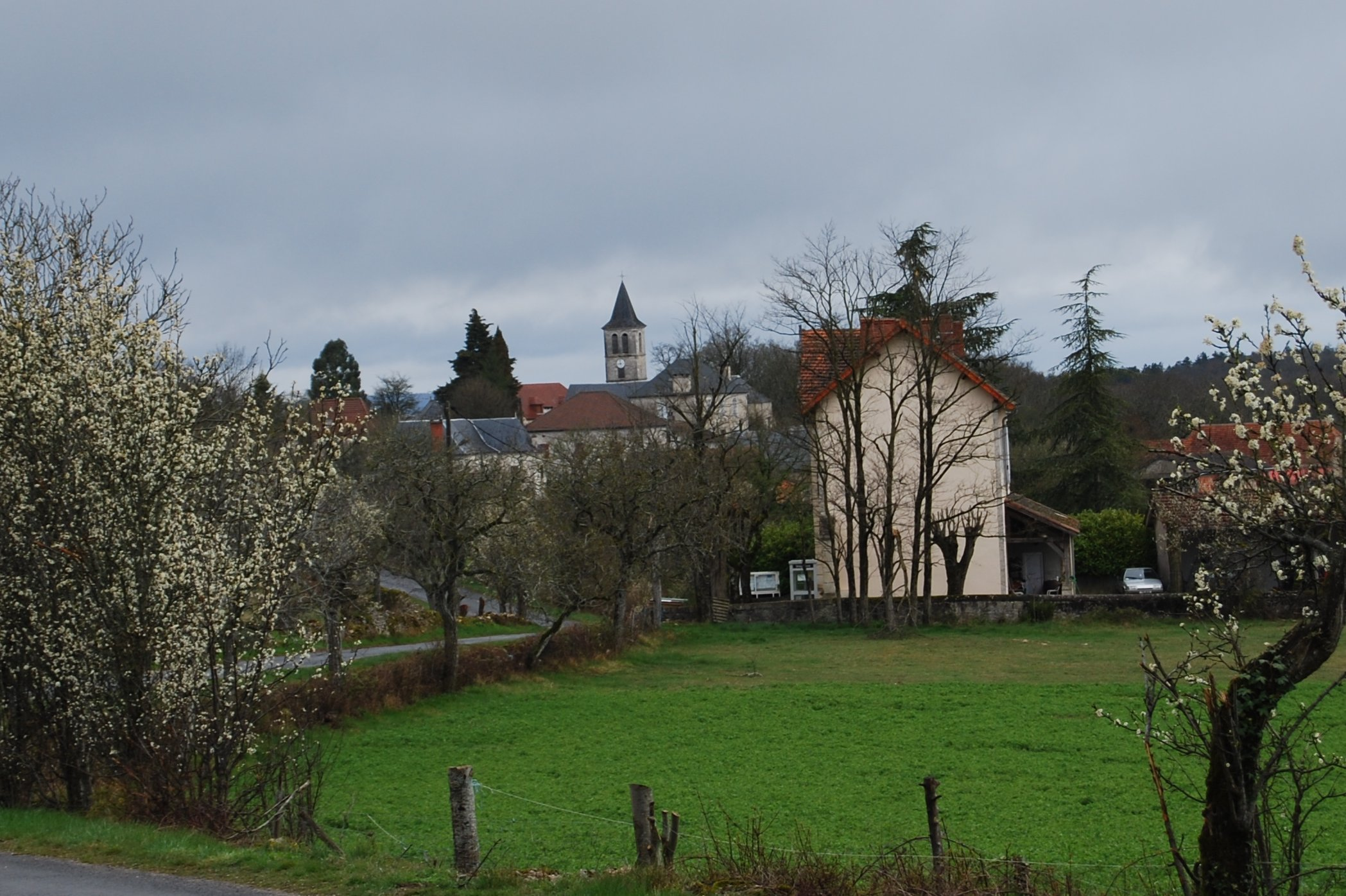
- A general view of Saint-Chels
- Location of Saint-Chels
- Location within France Location within Occitanie
- Coordinates: 44°31′47″N 1°48′07″E
- Country: France
- Region: Occitania
- Department: Lot
- Arrondissement: Figeac
- Canton: Causse et Vallées
- Intercommunality: CC Grand-Figeac

Government
  - Mayor (2020–2026): Alain Gouget
- Area^{1}: 17.86 km^{2} (6.90 sq mi)
- Elevation: 394 m (1,293 ft)
- Highest elevation: 394 m (1,293 ft)
- Lowest elevation: 157 m (515 ft)
- Population (2023): 148
  - Density: 8.29/km^{2} (21.5/sq mi)
- Time zone: UTC+01:00 (CET)
  - Summer (DST): UTC+02:00 (CEST)
- INSEE/Postal code: 46254 /46160
- ^{1} French Land Register data, which excludes lakes, ponds, glaciers > 1 km^{2} (0.386 sq mi or 247 acres) and river estuaries.

Saint-Chels is a commune in the Lot department in south-western France.

== See also ==
- Communes of the Lot department
