= Canton of Causse et Vallées =

Coordinates: 44.49°N 1.84°E

The canton of Causse et Vallées is an administrative division of the Lot department in southern France. It was created at the French canton reorganisation which came into effect in March 2015. Its seat is in Cajarc.

It consists of the following communes:

1. Berganty
2. Blars
3. Bouziès
4. Brengues
5. Cabrerets
6. Cadrieu
7. Cajarc
8. Calvignac
9. Caniac-du-Causse
10. Carayac
11. Cénevières
12. Cœur-de-Causse
13. Cras
14. Crégols
15. Esclauzels
16. Espagnac-Sainte-Eulalie
17. Espédaillac
18. Frontenac
19. Gréalou
20. Grèzes
21. Larnagol
22. Larroque-Toirac
23. Lauzès
24. Lentillac-du-Causse
25. Lunegarde
26. Marcilhac-sur-Célé
27. Montbrun
28. Nadillac
29. Orniac
30. Les Pechs-du-Vers
31. Puyjourdes
32. Quissac
33. Sabadel-Lauzès
34. Saint-Chels
35. Saint-Cirq-Lapopie
36. Saint Géry-Vers
37. Saint-Jean-de-Laur
38. Saint-Martin-Labouval
39. Saint-Pierre-Toirac
40. Saint-Sulpice
41. Sauliac-sur-Célé
42. Sénaillac-Lauzès
43. Soulomès
44. Tour-de-Faure
