= Carayac =

- Commune
- Location of Carayac
- Location within France Location within Occitanie
- Coordinates: 44°32′54″N 1°55′27″E
- Country: France
- Region: Occitania
- Department: Lot
- Arrondissement: Figeac
- Canton: Causse et Vallées
- Intercommunality: CC Grand-Figeac

Government
  - Mayor (2020–2026): Léa Guerrieri
- Area^{1}: 6.87 km^{2} (2.65 sq mi)
- Elevation: 350 m (1,150 ft)
- Highest elevation: 409 m (1,342 ft)
- Lowest elevation: 271 m (889 ft)
- Population (2023): 104
  - Density: 15.1/km^{2} (39.2/sq mi)
- Time zone: UTC+01:00 (CET)
  - Summer (DST): UTC+02:00 (CEST)
- INSEE/Postal code: 46056 /46160
- ^{1} French Land Register data, which excludes lakes, ponds, glaciers > 1 km^{2} (0.386 sq mi or 247 acres) and river estuaries.

Carayac (French pronunciation: [kaʁajak]) is a commune in the Lot department in southwestern France.

== See also ==
- Communes of the Lot department
