= Lauzès =

- Commune
- Location of Lauzès
- Location within France Location within Occitanie
- Coordinates: 44°34′10″N 1°34′54″E
- Country: France
- Region: Occitania
- Department: Lot
- Arrondissement: Gourdon
- Canton: Causse et Vallées
- Intercommunality: Causse de Labastide-Murat

Government
  - Mayor (2020–2026): Véronique Casagrande
- Area^{1}: 6.39 km^{2} (2.47 sq mi)
- Elevation: 300 m (980 ft)
- Highest elevation: 394 m (1,293 ft)
- Lowest elevation: 197 m (646 ft)
- Population (2023): 200
  - Density: 31/km^{2} (81/sq mi)
- Time zone: UTC+01:00 (CET)
  - Summer (DST): UTC+02:00 (CEST)
- INSEE/Postal code: 46162 /46360
- ^{1} French Land Register data, which excludes lakes, ponds, glaciers > 1 km^{2} (0.386 sq mi or 247 acres) and river estuaries.

Lauzès (French pronunciation: [lozɛs]; Occitan: Lausès) is a commune in the Lot department in south-western France.

== See also ==
- Communes of the Lot department
