= Espédaillac =

- Commune
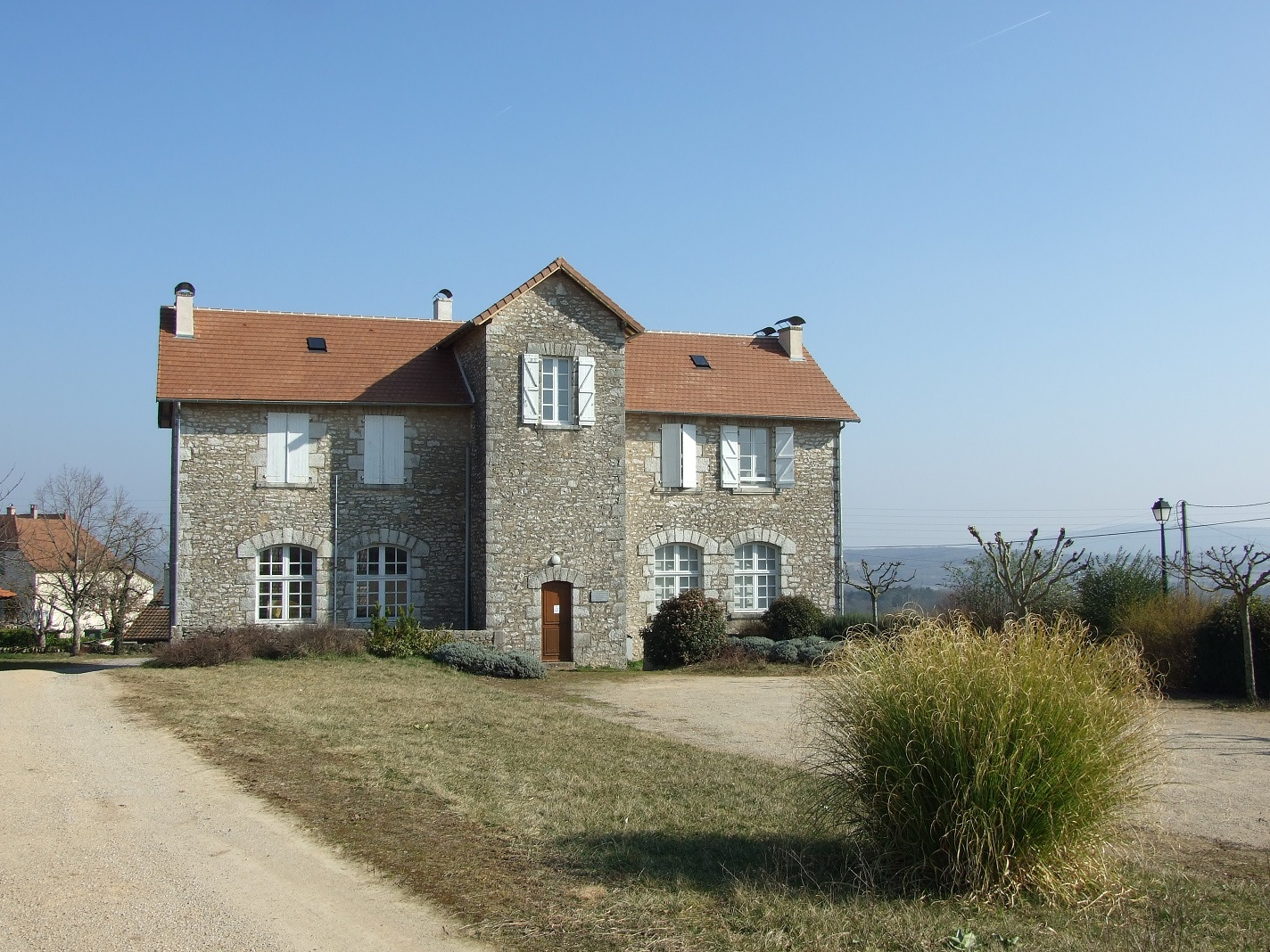
- Town hall
- Location of Espédaillac
- Location within France Location within Occitanie
- Coordinates: 44°38′20″N 1°46′24″E
- Country: France
- Region: Occitania
- Department: Lot
- Arrondissement: Figeac
- Canton: Causse et Vallées
- Intercommunality: Grand-Figeac

Government
  - Mayor (2020–2026): Gérard Magne
- Area^{1}: 34.93 km^{2} (13.49 sq mi)
- Elevation: 367 m (1,204 ft)
- Highest elevation: 444 m (1,457 ft)
- Lowest elevation: 255 m (837 ft)
- Population (2023): 290
  - Density: 8.3/km^{2} (22/sq mi)
- Time zone: UTC+01:00 (CET)
  - Summer (DST): UTC+02:00 (CEST)
- INSEE/Postal code: 46094 /46320
- ^{1} French Land Register data, which excludes lakes, ponds, glaciers > 1 km^{2} (0.386 sq mi or 247 acres) and river estuaries.

Espédaillac (French pronunciation: [ɛspedajak]; Occitan: Espedalhac) is a commune in the Lot department in south-western France.

== See also ==
- Communes of the Lot department
