= Communes of the Lot department =

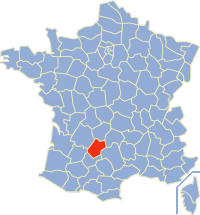

The following is a list of the 312 communes of the Lot department of France.

The communes cooperate in the following intercommunalities (as of 2025):

- Communauté d'agglomération du Grand Cahors
- Communauté de communes du Causse de Labastide Murat
- Communauté de communes Causses et Vallée de la Dordogne
- Communauté de communes Cazals-Salviac
- Communauté de communes Grand-Figeac (partly)
- Communauté de communes Ouest Aveyron Communauté (partly)
- Communauté de communes du Pays de Lalbenque-Limogne
- Communauté de communes du Quercy Blanc
- Communauté de communes Quercy-Bouriane
- Communauté de communes de la Vallée du Lot et du Vignoble

INSEE	Postal	Commune
46001	46140	Albas
46002	46500	Albiac
46003	46500	Alvignac
46004	46120	Anglars
46005	46140	Anglars-Juillac
46006	46300	Anglars-Nozac
46007	46090	Arcambal
46008	46250	Les Arques
46009	46320	Assier
46010	46090	Aujols
46011	46400	Autoire
46012	46120	Aynac
46013	46230	Bach
46015	46270	Bagnac-sur-Célé
46016	46600	Baladou
46017	46400	Bannes
46263	46800	Barguelonne-en-Quercy
46018	46500	Le Bastit
46020	46260	Beauregard
46021	46100	Béduer
46022	46140	Bélaye
46023	46230	Belfort-du-Quercy
46156	46090	Bellefont-La Rauze
46024	46130	Belmont-Bretenoux
46026	46230	Belmont-Sainte-Foi
46027	46090	Berganty
46338	46210	Bessonies
46028	46110	Bétaille
46029	46130	Biars-sur-Cère
46030	46500	Bio
46031	46330	Blars
46032	46150	Boissières
46034	46120	Le Bourg
46035	46100	Boussac
46036	46120	Le Bouyssou
46037	46330	Bouziès
46039	46320	Brengues
46038	46130	Bretenoux
46040	46330	Cabrerets
46041	46160	Cadrieu
46042	46000	Cahors
46043	46130	Cahus
46044	46140	Caillac
46045	46160	Cajarc
46046	46150	Calamane
46047	46350	Calès
46049	46160	Calvignac
46050	46140	Cambayrac
46051	46100	Cambes
46052	46100	Camboulit
46053	46100	Camburat
46054	46240	Caniac-du-Causse
46055	46100	Capdenac
46056	46160	Carayac
46057	46100	Cardaillac
46058	46110	Carennac
46059	46500	Carlucet
46060	46140	Carnac-Rouffiac
46061	46700	Cassagnes
46062	46140	Castelfranc
46063	46170	Castelnau-Montratier-Sainte-Alauzie
46064	46150	Catus
46065	46110	Cavagnac
46066	46250	Cazals
46068	46330	Cénevières
46069	46170	Cézac
46070	46230	Cieurac
46138	46240	Cœur-de-Causse
46072	46310	Concorès
46073	46260	Concots
46074	46110	Condat
46075	46100	Corn
46076	46130	Cornac
46078	46500	Couzou
46079	46360	Cras
46080	46150	Crayssac
46081	46330	Crégols
46082	46230	Cremps
46083	46600	Cressensac-Sarrazac
46084	46600	Creysse
46085	46270	Cuzac
46086	46600	Cuzance
46087	46340	Dégagnac
46088	46140	Douelle
46089	46700	Duravel
46090	46320	Durbans
46091	46230	Escamps
46092	46090	Esclauzels
46093	46320	Espagnac-Sainte-Eulalie
46094	46320	Espédaillac
46095	46090	Espère
46096	46120	Espeyroux
46097	46130	Estal
46098	46300	Fajoles
46100	46100	Faycelles
46101	46270	Felzins
46102	46100	Figeac
46104	46320	Flaujac-Gare
46105	46090	Flaujac-Poujols
46106	46600	Floirac
46107	46700	Floressas
46108	46100	Fons
46109	46230	Fontanes
46111	46100	Fourmagnac
46112	46090	Francoulès
46113	46310	Frayssinet
46114	46250	Frayssinet-le-Gélat
46115	46400	Frayssinhes
46116	46160	Frontenac
46117	46130	Gagnac-sur-Cère
46118	46600	Gignac
46119	46150	Gigouzac
46120	46250	Gindou
46121	46300	Ginouillac
46122	46130	Gintrac
46123	46130	Girac
46124	46130	Glanes
46125	46210	Gorses
46126	46250	Goujounac
46127	46300	Gourdon
46128	46500	Gramat
46129	46160	Gréalou
46130	46700	Grézels
46131	46320	Grèzes
46132	46500	Issendolus
46133	46320	Issepts
46134	46150	Les Junies
46135	46210	Labastide-du-Haut-Mont
46136	46150	Labastide-du-Vert
46137	46090	Labastide-Marnhac
46139	46120	Labathude
46140	46230	Laburgade
46142	46700	Lacapelle-Cabanac
46143	46120	Lacapelle-Marival
46144	46200	Lacave
46145	46200	Lachapelle-Auzac
46146	46400	Ladirat
46147	46220	Lagardelle
46148	46230	Lalbenque
46149	46090	Lamagdelaine
46151	46240	Lamothe-Cassel
46152	46350	Lamothe-Fénelon
46153	46200	Lanzac
46154	46260	Laramière
46155	46160	Larnagol
46157	46160	Larroque-Toirac
46159	46400	Latouille-Lentillac
46160	46210	Latronquière
46161	46210	Lauresses
46162	46360	Lauzès
46163	46130	Laval-de-Cère
46164	46340	Lavercantière
46165	46500	Lavergne
46262	46800	Lendou-en-Quercy
46167	46330	Lentillac-du-Causse
46168	46100	Lentillac-Saint-Blaise
46169	46300	Léobard

INSEE	Postal	Commune
46170	46120	Leyme
46171	46150	Lherm
46173	46260	Limogne-en-Quercy
46174	46270	Linac
46175	46100	Lissac-et-Mouret
46176	46320	Livernon
46177	46130	Loubressac
46178	46350	Loupiac
46179	46260	Lugagnac
46180	46100	Lunan
46181	46240	Lunegarde
46182	46140	Luzech
46183	46160	Marcilhac-sur-Célé
46184	46250	Marminiac
46185	46600	Martel
46186	46350	Masclat
46187	46700	Mauroux
46188	46090	Maxou
46337	46200	Mayrac
46189	46500	Mayrinhac-Lentour
46190	46150	Mechmont
46191	46090	Mercuès
46192	46200	Meyronne
46193	46500	Miers
46194	46300	Milhac
46195	46120	Molières
46196	46310	Montamel
46197	46090	Le Montat
46198	46160	Montbrun
46199	46700	Montcabrier
46200	46250	Montcléra
46201	46800	Montcuq-en-Quercy-Blanc
46202	46230	Montdoumerc
46203	46210	Montet-et-Bouxal
46204	46240	Montfaucon
46205	46150	Montgesty
46206	46800	Montlauzun
46207	46270	Montredon
46208	46600	Montvalent
46209	46350	Nadaillac-de-Rouge
46210	46360	Nadillac
46211	46150	Nuzéjouls
46212	46330	Orniac
46213	46500	Padirac
46214	46140	Parnac
46215	46350	Payrac
46216	46300	Payrignac
46252	46360	Les Pechs-du-Vers
46172	46170	Pern-Lhospitalet
46218	46220	Pescadoires
46219	46310	Peyrilles
46220	46200	Pinsac
46221	46100	Planioles
46222	46250	Pomarède
46223	46150	Pontcirq
46033	46800	Porte-du-Quercy
46224	46090	Pradines
46225	46220	Prayssac
46226	46270	Prendeignes
46227	46260	Promilhanes
46228	46130	Prudhomat
46229	46130	Puybrun
46230	46260	Puyjourdes
46231	46700	Puy-l'Évêque
46233	46320	Quissac
46234	46340	Rampoux
46235	46500	Reilhac
46236	46350	Reilhaguet
46237	46320	Reyrevignes
46238	46500	Rignac
46239	46200	Le Roc
46240	46500	Rocamadour
46241	46300	Rouffilhac
46242	46120	Rudelle
46243	46120	Rueyres
46244	46210	Sabadel-Latronquière
46245	46360	Sabadel-Lauzès
46246	46500	Saignes
46247	46260	Saillac
46249	46120	Saint-Bressou
46250	46250	Saint-Caprais
46251	46400	Saint-Céré
46253	46310	Saint-Chamarand
46254	46160	Saint-Chels
46255	46210	Saint-Cirgues
46256	46330	Saint-Cirq-Lapopie
46257	46300	Saint-Cirq-Madelon
46258	46300	Saint-Cirq-Souillaguet
46259	46300	Saint-Clair
46264	46150	Saint-Denis-Catus
46265	46600	Saint-Denis-lès-Martel
46260	46120	Sainte-Colombe
46266	46100	Saint-Félix
46267	46310	Saint-Germain-du-Bel-Air
46268	46330	Saint Géry-Vers
46269	46210	Saint-Hilaire
46270	46260	Saint-Jean-de-Laur
46339	46400	Saint-Jean-Lagineste
46271	46400	Saint-Jean-Lespinasse
46272	46270	Saint-Jean-Mirabel
46273	46400	Saint-Laurent-les-Tours
46276	46330	Saint-Martin-Labouval
46277	46700	Saint-Martin-le-Redon
46279	46120	Saint-Maurice-en-Quercy
46280	46150	Saint-Médard
46281	46400	Saint-Médard-de-Presque
46282	46210	Saint-Médard-Nicourby
46283	46110	Saint-Michel-de-Bannières
46284	46130	Saint-Michel-Loubéjou
46286	46400	Saint-Paul-de-Vern
46103	46170	Saint-Paul-Flaugnac
46288	46100	Saint-Perdoux
46340	46090	Saint-Pierre-Lafeuille
46289	46160	Saint-Pierre-Toirac
46290	46300	Saint-Projet
46292	46320	Saint-Simon
46293	46200	Saint-Sozy
46294	46160	Saint-Sulpice
46295	46400	Saint-Vincent-du-Pendit
46296	46140	Saint-Vincent-Rive-d'Olt
46297	46340	Salviac
46299	46330	Sauliac-sur-Célé
46301	46140	Sauzet
46302	46210	Sénaillac-Latronquière
46303	46360	Sénaillac-Lauzès
46304	46240	Séniergues
46305	46700	Sérignac
46306	46320	Sonac
46307	46700	Soturac
46308	46300	Soucirac
46309	46200	Souillac
46310	46240	Soulomès
46311	46190	Sousceyrac-en-Quercy
46312	46110	Strenquels
46313	46130	Tauriac
46314	46120	Terrou
46315	46190	Teyssieu
46316	46150	Thédirac
46317	46500	Thégra
46318	46120	Thémines
46319	46120	Théminettes
46320	46330	Tour-de-Faure
46321	46700	Touzac
46322	46090	Trespoux-Rassiels
46323	46240	Ussel
46324	46310	Uzech
46328	46260	Varaire
46329	46230	Vaylats
46330	46110	Vayrac
46332	46100	Viazac
46333	46260	Vidaillac
46334	46300	Le Vigan-en-Quercy
46232	46110	Le Vignon-en-Quercy
46335	46090	Villesèque
46336	46700	Vire-sur-Lot
