= Brengues =

- Commune
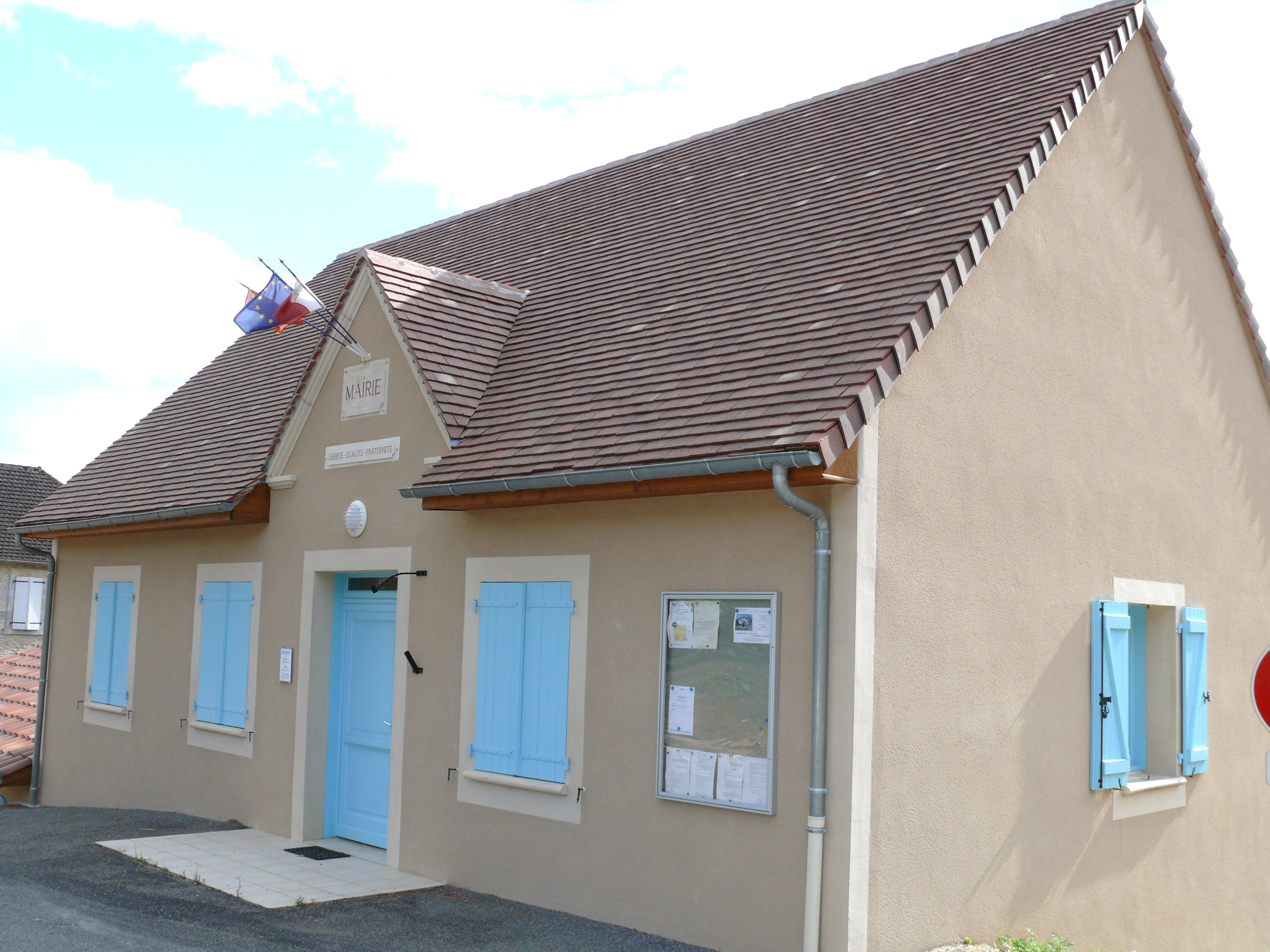
- The town hall in Brengues
- Location of Brengues
- Location within France Location within Occitanie
- Coordinates: 44°34′42″N 1°49′59″E
- Country: France
- Region: Occitania
- Department: Lot
- Arrondissement: Figeac
- Canton: Causse et Vallées
- Intercommunality: CC Grand-Figeac

Government
  - Mayor (2020–2026): Jean-Luc Vallet
- Area^{1}: 20.56 km^{2} (7.94 sq mi)
- Elevation: 200 m (660 ft)
- Highest elevation: 392 m (1,286 ft)
- Lowest elevation: 150 m (490 ft)
- Population (2023): 195
  - Density: 9.48/km^{2} (24.6/sq mi)
- Time zone: UTC+01:00 (CET)
  - Summer (DST): UTC+02:00 (CEST)
- INSEE/Postal code: 46039 /46320
- ^{1} French Land Register data, which excludes lakes, ponds, glaciers > 1 km^{2} (0.386 sq mi or 247 acres) and river estuaries.

Brengues (Languedocien: Brengas) is a commune in the Lot department in southwestern France.

== Population ==
Historical population
Year	Pop.	±% p.a.
1968	169	—
1975	158	−0.96%
1982	150	−0.74%
1990	159	+0.73%
1999	175	+1.07%
2007	224	+3.13%
2012	194	−2.83%
2017	211	+1.69%
2023	195	−1.31%
Source: INSEE

== See also ==
- Communes of the Lot department
