= Marcilhac-sur-Célé =

Marcilhac-sur-Célé Marcilhac (Occitan)
- Commune
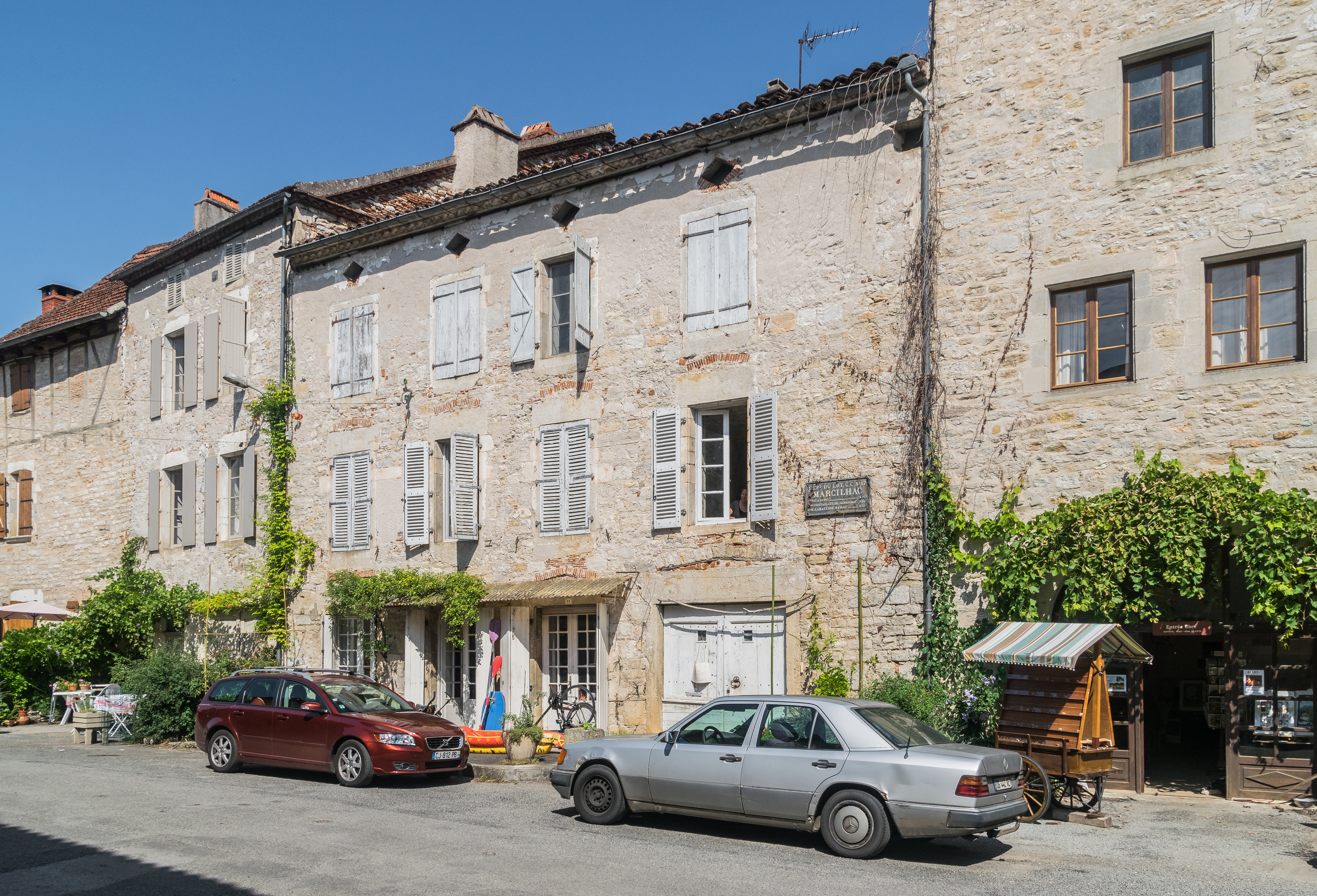
- A street in Marcilhac-sur-Célé

- Coat of arms
- Location of Marcilhac-sur-Célé
- Location within France Location within Occitanie
- Coordinates: 44°33′15″N 1°46′18″E
- Country: France
- Region: Occitania
- Department: Lot
- Arrondissement: Figeac
- Canton: Causse et Vallées
- Intercommunality: CC Grand-Figeac

Government
  - Mayor (2020–2026): Jean-Paul Mignat
- Area^{1}: 27.35 km^{2} (10.56 sq mi)
- Highest elevation: 391 m (1,283 ft)
- Lowest elevation: 140 m (460 ft)
- Population (2023): 173
  - Density: 6.33/km^{2} (16.4/sq mi)
- Time zone: UTC+01:00 (CET)
  - Summer (DST): UTC+02:00 (CEST)
- INSEE/Postal code: 46183 /46160
- ^{1} French Land Register data, which excludes lakes, ponds, glaciers > 1 km^{2} (0.386 sq mi or 247 acres) and river estuaries.

Marcilhac-sur-Célé (French pronunciation: [maʁsijak syʁ sele], lit. 'Marcilhac-on-Célé'; Occitan: Marcilhac), commonly referred to simply as Marcilhac, is a commune in the Lot department in the Occitania region in Southwestern France. It has many historic buildings, including the ruined 9th-century Abbey of St Peter. As of 2023, the population of the commune was 173.

== Gallery ==
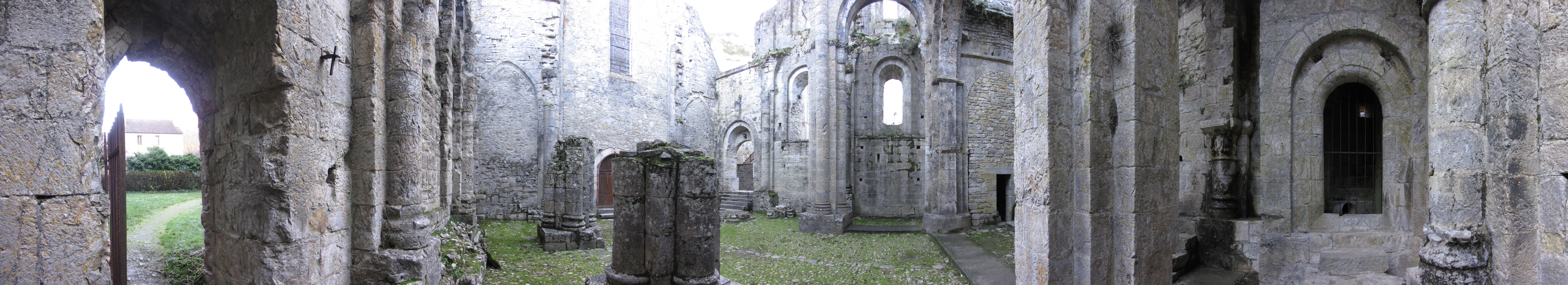
Panorama of the ruined abbey

== See also ==
- Communes of the Lot department
