= Calvignac =

- Commune
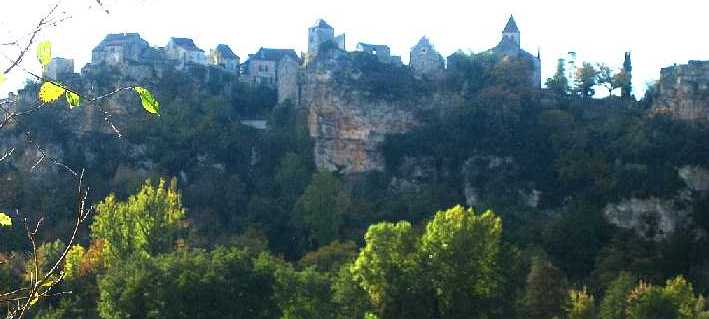
- A general view of Calvignac

- Coat of arms
- Location of Calvignac
- Location within France Location within Occitanie
- Coordinates: 44°27′54″N 1°46′46″E
- Country: France
- Region: Occitania
- Department: Lot
- Arrondissement: Cahors
- Canton: Causse et Vallées
- Intercommunality: Grand-Figeac

Government
  - Mayor (2020–2026): Didier Burg
- Area^{1}: 17.89 km^{2} (6.91 sq mi)
- Elevation: 144 m (472 ft)
- Highest elevation: 351 m (1,152 ft)
- Lowest elevation: 130 m (430 ft)
- Population (2023): 245
  - Density: 13.7/km^{2} (35.5/sq mi)
- Time zone: UTC+01:00 (CET)
  - Summer (DST): UTC+02:00 (CEST)
- INSEE/Postal code: 46049 /46160
- ^{1} French Land Register data, which excludes lakes, ponds, glaciers > 1 km^{2} (0.386 sq mi or 247 acres) and river estuaries.

Calvignac (French pronunciation: [kalviɲak]; Occitan: Calvinhac) is a commune in the Lot department in south-western France.

== See also ==
- Communes of the Lot department
