= Sénaillac-Lauzès =

- Commune
- Location of Sénaillac-Lauzès
- Location within France Location within Occitanie
- Coordinates: 44°36′11″N 1°39′06″E
- Country: France
- Region: Occitania
- Department: Lot
- Arrondissement: Gourdon
- Canton: Causse et Vallées
- Intercommunality: Causse de Labastide-Murat

Government
  - Mayor (2020–2026): Christophe Benac
- Area^{1}: 25.78 km^{2} (9.95 sq mi)
- Elevation: 395 m (1,296 ft)
- Highest elevation: 449 m (1,473 ft)
- Lowest elevation: 288 m (945 ft)
- Population (2023): 145
  - Density: 5.62/km^{2} (14.6/sq mi)
- Time zone: UTC+01:00 (CET)
  - Summer (DST): UTC+02:00 (CEST)
- INSEE/Postal code: 46303 /46360
- ^{1} French Land Register data, which excludes lakes, ponds, glaciers > 1 km^{2} (0.386 sq mi or 247 acres) and river estuaries.

Sénaillac-Lauzès (French pronunciation: [senajak lozɛs]; Occitan: Senalhac de Lausès) is a commune in the Lot department in south-western France.

== See also ==
- Communes of the Lot department
