= Esclauzels =

- Commune
- Coat of arms
- Location of Esclauzels
- Location within France Location within Occitanie
- Coordinates: 44°25′21″N 1°37′17″E
- Country: France
- Region: Occitania
- Department: Lot
- Arrondissement: Cahors
- Canton: Causse et Vallées
- Intercommunality: Pays de Lalbenque-Limogne

Government
  - Mayor (2020–2026): Martin Poinsot
- Area^{1}: 17.73 km^{2} (6.85 sq mi)
- Elevation: 300 m (980 ft)
- Highest elevation: 369 m (1,211 ft)
- Lowest elevation: 120 m (390 ft)
- Population (2023): 224
  - Density: 12.6/km^{2} (32.7/sq mi)
- Time zone: UTC+01:00 (CET)
  - Summer (DST): UTC+02:00 (CEST)
- INSEE/Postal code: 46092 /46090
- ^{1} French Land Register data, which excludes lakes, ponds, glaciers > 1 km^{2} (0.386 sq mi or 247 acres) and river estuaries.

Esclauzels (French pronunciation: [ɛsklozɛl]; Occitan: Esclausèls) is a commune in the Lot department in the south-western France. As of 2019, its population is 221.

The commune of Esclauzels is part of the arrondissement of Cahors and the canton of Causse et Vallées.

== See also ==
- Communes of the Lot department
