= Saint-Martin-Labouval =

- Commune
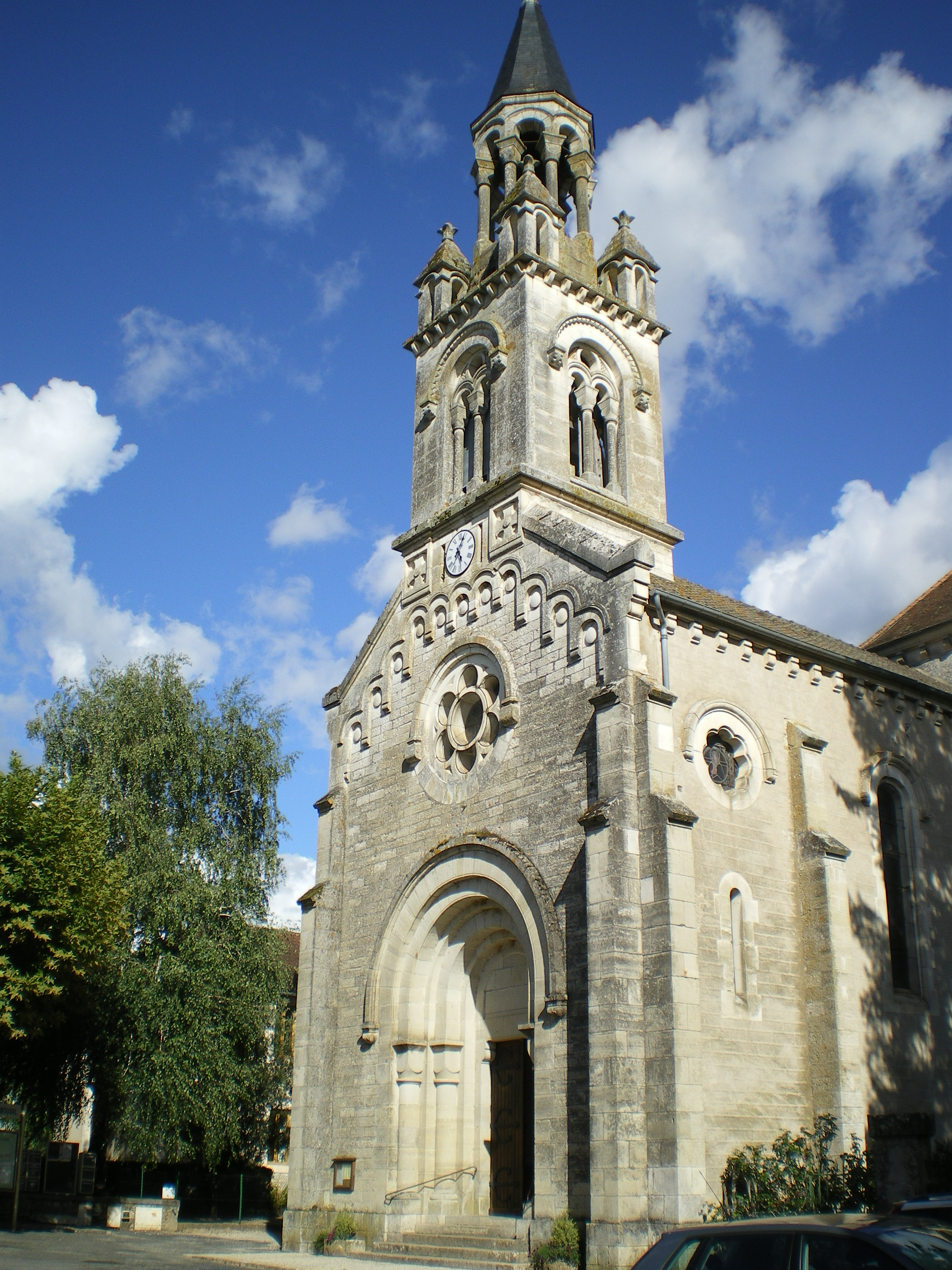
- The church of Saint-Martin
- Location of Saint-Martin-Labouval
- Location within France Location within Occitanie
- Coordinates: 44°27′57″N 1°44′03″E
- Country: France
- Region: Occitania
- Department: Lot
- Arrondissement: Cahors
- Canton: Causse et Vallées

Government
  - Mayor (2020–2026): Jacques Vaquié
- Area^{1}: 13.49 km^{2} (5.21 sq mi)
- Elevation: 146 m (479 ft)
- Highest elevation: 384 m (1,260 ft)
- Lowest elevation: 129 m (423 ft)
- Population (2023): 202
  - Density: 15.0/km^{2} (38.8/sq mi)
- Time zone: UTC+01:00 (CET)
  - Summer (DST): UTC+02:00 (CEST)
- INSEE/Postal code: 46276 /46330
- ^{1} French Land Register data, which excludes lakes, ponds, glaciers > 1 km^{2} (0.386 sq mi or 247 acres) and river estuaries.

Saint-Martin-Labouval (French pronunciation: [sɛ̃ maʁtɛ̃ labuval]; Languedocien: Sant Martin Laboval) is a commune in the Lot department in south-western France.

== See also ==
- Communes of the Lot department
