= Orniac =

- Commune
- Location of Orniac
- Location within France Location within Occitanie
- Coordinates: 44°32′45″N 1°40′06″E
- Country: France
- Region: Occitania
- Department: Lot
- Arrondissement: Gourdon
- Canton: Causse et Vallées
- Intercommunality: Causse de Labastide-Murat

Government
  - Mayor (2020–2026): Thérèse Vermande
- Area^{1}: 16.79 km^{2} (6.48 sq mi)
- Elevation: 365 m (1,198 ft)
- Highest elevation: 364 m (1,194 ft)
- Lowest elevation: 130 m (430 ft)
- Population (2023): 73
  - Density: 4.3/km^{2} (11/sq mi)
- Time zone: UTC+01:00 (CET)
  - Summer (DST): UTC+02:00 (CEST)
- INSEE/Postal code: 46212 /46330
- ^{1} French Land Register data, which excludes lakes, ponds, glaciers > 1 km^{2} (0.386 sq mi or 247 acres) and river estuaries.

Orniac (French pronunciation: [ɔʁnjak]) is a commune in the department of Lot in the Occitanie Region of south-western France.

== See also ==
- Communes of the Lot department
