= Saint-Jean-de-Laur =

- Commune
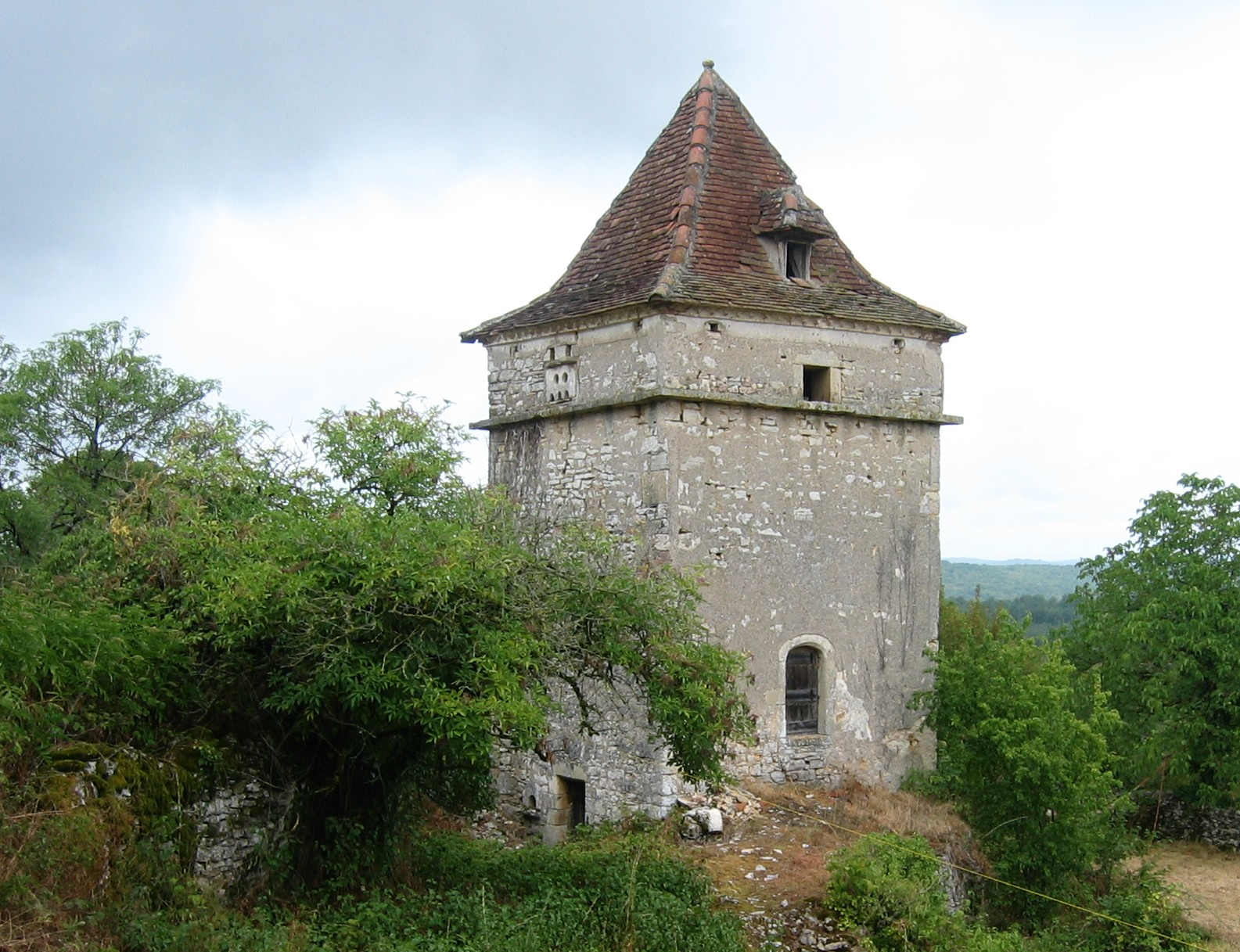
- The pigeon loft
- Location of Saint-Jean-de-Laur
- Location within France Location within Occitanie
- Coordinates: 44°25′13″N 1°50′12″E
- Country: France
- Region: Occitania
- Department: Lot
- Arrondissement: Figeac
- Canton: Causse et Vallées
- Intercommunality: CC Grand-Figeac

Government
  - Mayor (2020–2026): Didier Conte
- Area^{1}: 21.57 km^{2} (8.33 sq mi)
- Elevation: 350 m (1,150 ft)
- Highest elevation: 402 m (1,319 ft)
- Lowest elevation: 141 m (463 ft)
- Population (2023): 251
  - Density: 11.6/km^{2} (30.1/sq mi)
- Time zone: UTC+01:00 (CET)
  - Summer (DST): UTC+02:00 (CEST)
- INSEE/Postal code: 46270 /46260
- ^{1} French Land Register data, which excludes lakes, ponds, glaciers > 1 km^{2} (0.386 sq mi or 247 acres) and river estuaries.

Saint-Jean-de-Laur (French pronunciation: [sɛ̃ ʒɑ̃ də lɔʁ]; Languedocien: Sent Joan de Laur) is a commune in the Lot department in south-western France.

== See also ==
- Communes of the Lot department
