= Montbrun, Lot =

Montbrun
- Commune
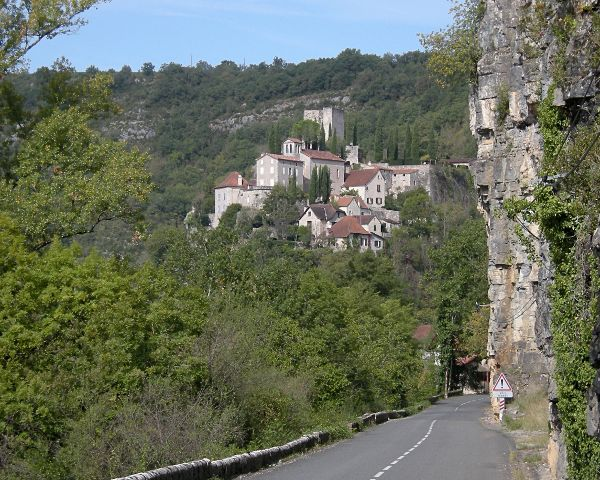
- A general view of Montbrun
- Location of Montbrun
- Location within France Location within Occitanie
- Coordinates: 44°30′22″N 1°54′05″E
- Country: France
- Region: Occitania
- Department: Lot
- Arrondissement: Figeac
- Canton: Causse et Vallées

Government
  - Mayor (2020–2026): Sylvie Rauffet
- Area^{1}: 8.34 km^{2} (3.22 sq mi)
- Elevation: 157 m (515 ft)
- Highest elevation: 395 m (1,296 ft)
- Lowest elevation: 141 m (463 ft)
- Population (2023): 117
  - Density: 14.0/km^{2} (36.3/sq mi)
- Time zone: UTC+01:00 (CET)
  - Summer (DST): UTC+02:00 (CEST)
- INSEE/Postal code: 46198 /46160
- ^{1} French Land Register data, which excludes lakes, ponds, glaciers > 1 km^{2} (0.386 sq mi or 247 acres) and river estuaries.

Montbrun (French pronunciation: [mɔ̃bʁœ̃]; Montbrun in Occitan) is a commune in the Lot department in south-western France.

== See also ==
- Communes of the Lot department
