= Quissac-en-Quercy =

- Commune
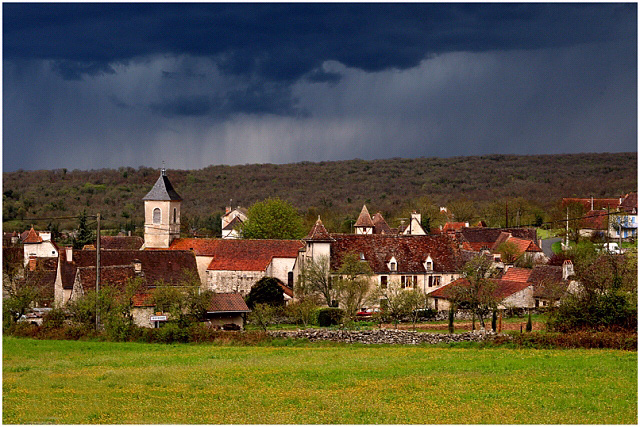
- A general view of Quissac
- Location of Quissac-en-Quercy
- Location within France Location within Occitanie
- Coordinates: 44°38′45″N 1°43′52″E
- Country: France
- Region: Occitania
- Department: Lot
- Arrondissement: Figeac
- Canton: Causse et Vallées
- Intercommunality: Grand-Figeac

Government
  - Mayor (2020–2026): Alain Fogarizzu
- Area^{1}: 25.17 km^{2} (9.72 sq mi)
- Elevation: 117 m (384 ft)
- Highest elevation: 455 m (1,493 ft)
- Lowest elevation: 269 m (883 ft)
- Population (2023): 107
  - Density: 4.25/km^{2} (11.0/sq mi)
- Time zone: UTC+01:00 (CET)
  - Summer (DST): UTC+02:00 (CEST)
- INSEE/Postal code: 46233 /46320
- ^{1} French Land Register data, which excludes lakes, ponds, glaciers > 1 km^{2} (0.386 sq mi or 247 acres) and river estuaries.

Quissac-en-Quercy (French pronunciation: [kisak ɑ̃ kɛʁsi], lit. 'Quissac in Quercy'; before 2024: Quissac; Occitan: Quiçac) is a commune in the Lot department in south-western France.

== See also ==
- Communes of the Lot department
