= Bouziès =

- Commune
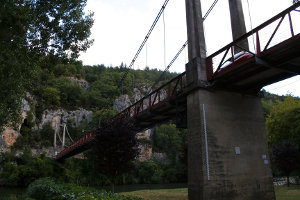
- The bridge at Bouziès
- Location of Bouziès
- Location within France Location within Occitanie
- Coordinates: 44°29′07″N 1°38′33″E
- Country: France
- Region: Occitania
- Department: Lot
- Arrondissement: Cahors
- Canton: Causse et Vallées
- Intercommunality: CA Grand Cahors

Government
  - Mayor (2020–2026): Gilles Raffy
- Area^{1}: 8.20 km^{2} (3.17 sq mi)
- Elevation: 148 m (486 ft)
- Highest elevation: 348 m (1,142 ft)
- Lowest elevation: 120 m (390 ft)
- Population (2023): 93
  - Density: 11/km^{2} (29/sq mi)
- Time zone: UTC+01:00 (CET)
  - Summer (DST): UTC+02:00 (CEST)
- INSEE/Postal code: 46037 /46330
- ^{1} French Land Register data, which excludes lakes, ponds, glaciers > 1 km^{2} (0.386 sq mi or 247 acres) and river estuaries.

Bouziès (French pronunciation: [buzjɛs]; Languedocien: Bosiès) is a commune in the Lot department in southwestern France.

== Population ==
Historical population
Year	Pop.	±% p.a.
1968	105	—
1975	93	−1.72%
1982	74	−3.21%
1990	77	+0.50%
1999	70	−1.05%
2007	75	+0.87%
2012	77	+0.53%
2017	84	+1.76%
2023	93	+1.71%
Source: INSEE

== See also ==
- Communes of the Lot department
