= Cénevières =

- Commune
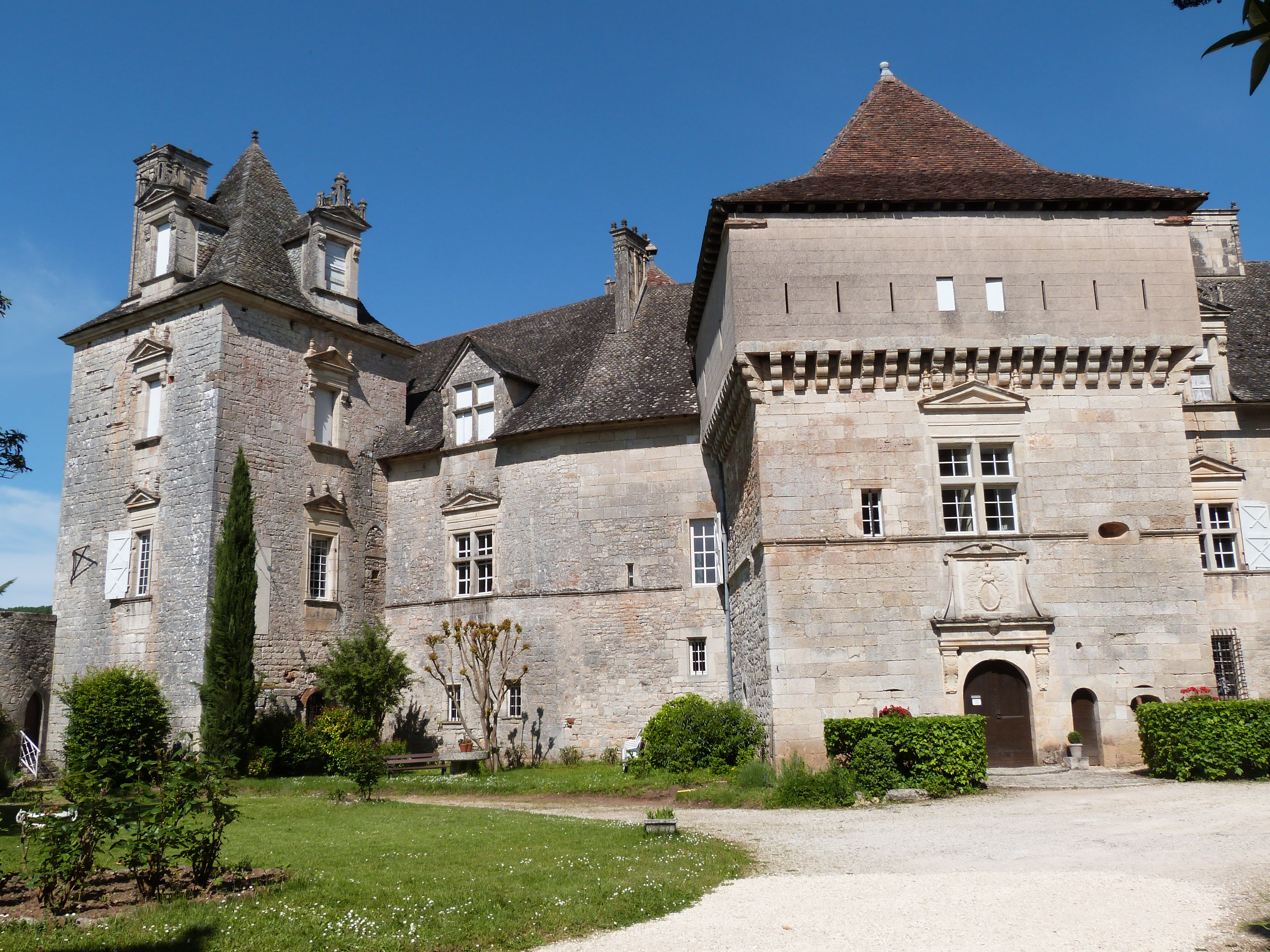
- The chateau in Cénevières
- Location of Cénevières
- Location within France Location within Occitanie
- Coordinates: 44°27′48″N 1°44′52″E
- Country: France
- Region: Occitania
- Department: Lot
- Arrondissement: Cahors
- Canton: Causse et Vallées
- Intercommunality: Pays de Lalbenque-Limogne

Government
  - Mayor (2020–2026): Gérard Dégletagne
- Area^{1}: 15.69 km^{2} (6.06 sq mi)
- Highest elevation: 351 m (1,152 ft)
- Lowest elevation: 129 m (423 ft)
- Population (2023): 185
  - Density: 11.8/km^{2} (30.5/sq mi)
- Time zone: UTC+01:00 (CET)
  - Summer (DST): UTC+02:00 (CEST)
- INSEE/Postal code: 46068 /46330
- ^{1} French Land Register data, which excludes lakes, ponds, glaciers > 1 km^{2} (0.386 sq mi or 247 acres) and river estuaries.

Cénevières (French pronunciation: [senəvjɛʁ]; Languedocien: Senibièras) is a commune in the Lot department in south-western France.

== See also ==
- Communes of the Lot department
