= Nadillac =

- Commune
- Location of Nadillac
- Location within France Location within Occitanie
- Coordinates: 44°33′48″N 1°31′09″E
- Country: France
- Region: Occitania
- Department: Lot
- Arrondissement: Gourdon
- Canton: Causse et Vallées
- Intercommunality: Causse de Labastide-Murat

Government
  - Mayor (2020–2026): Sophie Sarfati
- Area^{1}: 7.35 km^{2} (2.84 sq mi)
- Elevation: 366 m (1,201 ft)
- Highest elevation: 405 m (1,329 ft)
- Lowest elevation: 191 m (627 ft)
- Population (2023): 75
  - Density: 10/km^{2} (26/sq mi)
- Time zone: UTC+01:00 (CET)
  - Summer (DST): UTC+02:00 (CEST)
- INSEE/Postal code: 46210 /46360
- ^{1} French Land Register data, which excludes lakes, ponds, glaciers > 1 km^{2} (0.386 sq mi or 247 acres) and river estuaries.

Nadillac (French pronunciation: [nadijak]; Occitan: Nadilhac) is a commune in the Lot department in south-western France.

== Population ==
Historical population
Year	Pop.	±% p.a.
1968	59	—
1975	50	−2.34%
1982	55	+1.37%
1990	60	+1.09%
1999	60	+0.00%
2007	56	−0.86%
2012	76	+6.30%
2017	61	−4.30%
2023	75	+3.50%
Source: INSEE

== See also ==
- Communes of the Lot department
