= Saint-Sulpice, Lot =

Saint-Sulpice
- Commune
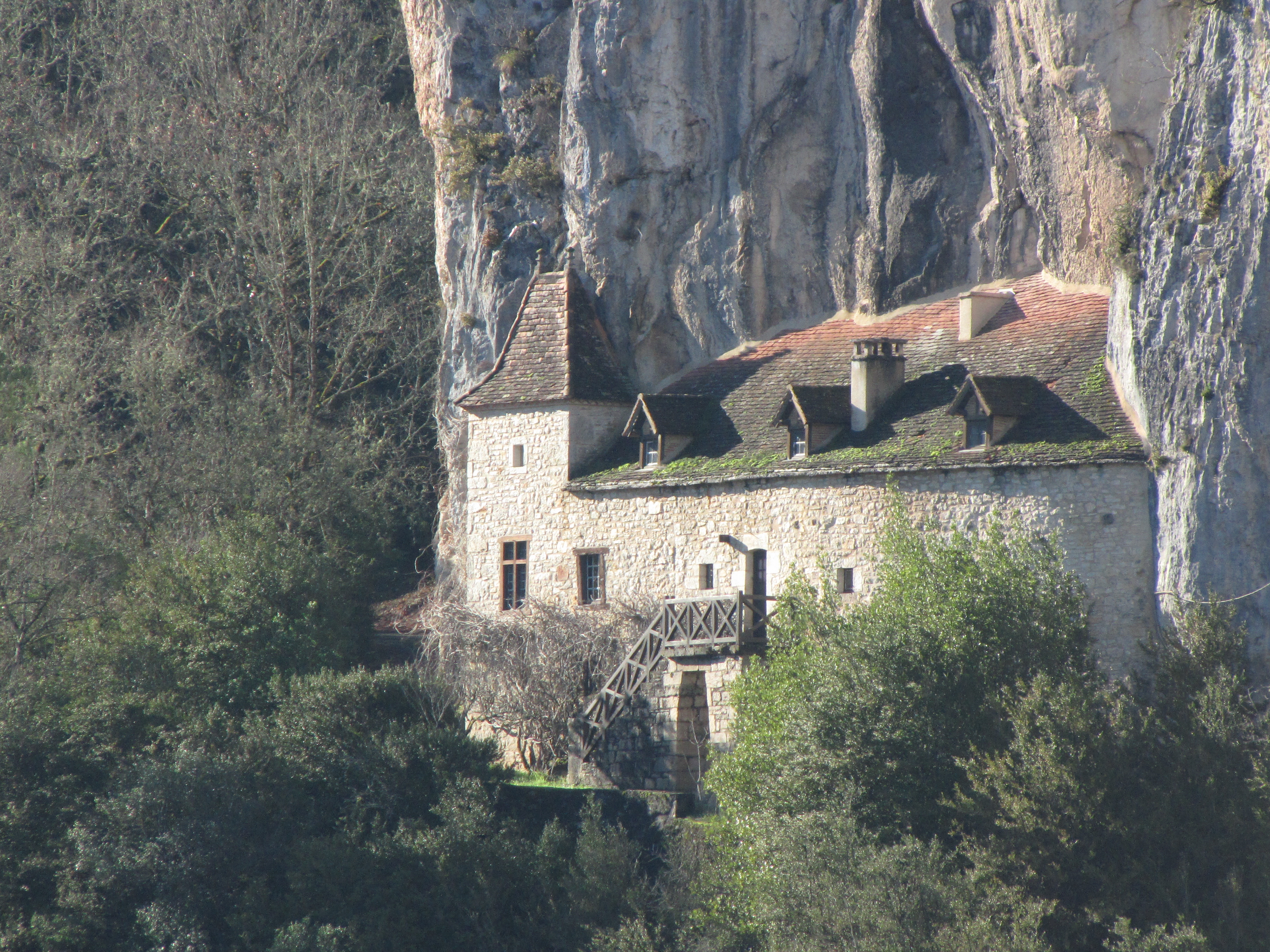
- Part-underground house in Saint-Sulpice
- Location of Saint-Sulpice
- Location within France Location within Occitanie
- Coordinates: 44°34′14″N 1°47′30″E
- Country: France
- Region: Occitania
- Department: Lot
- Arrondissement: Figeac
- Canton: Causse et Vallées
- Intercommunality: CC Grand-Figeac

Government
  - Mayor (2024–2026): Claudine Landes
- Area^{1}: 13.19 km^{2} (5.09 sq mi)
- Elevation: 300 m (980 ft)
- Highest elevation: 363 m (1,191 ft)
- Lowest elevation: 145 m (476 ft)
- Population (2023): 127
  - Density: 9.63/km^{2} (24.9/sq mi)
- Time zone: UTC+01:00 (CET)
  - Summer (DST): UTC+02:00 (CEST)
- INSEE/Postal code: 46294 /46160
- ^{1} French Land Register data, which excludes lakes, ponds, glaciers > 1 km^{2} (0.386 sq mi or 247 acres) and river estuaries.

Saint-Sulpice (French pronunciation: [sɛ̃ sylpis]; Languedocien: Sant Soplèci) is a commune in the Lot department in south-western France.

== See also ==
- Communes of the Lot department
