= Laroque-des-Arcs =

- Part of Bellefont-La Rauze
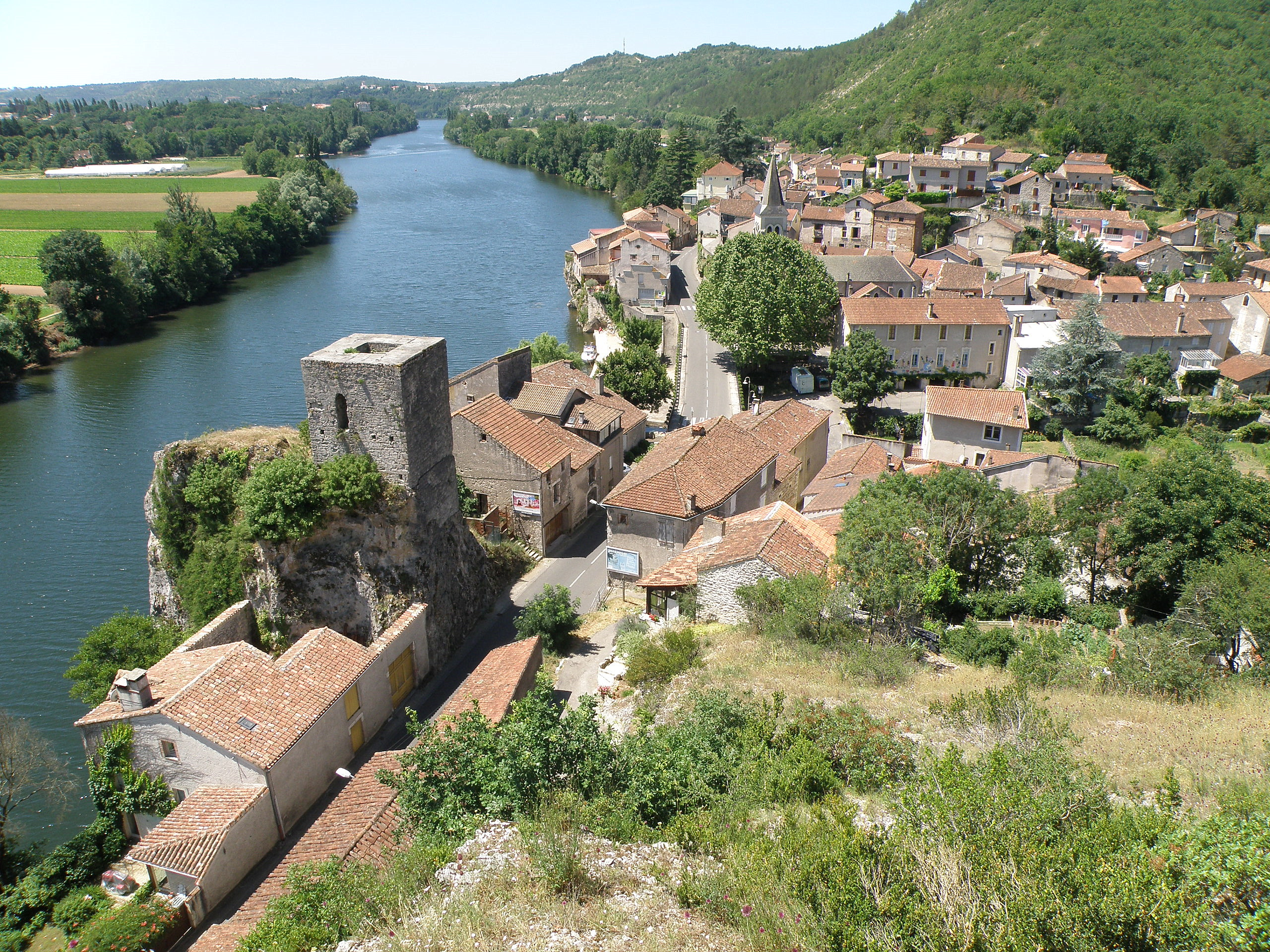
- A view across Laroque-des-Arcs
- Location of Laroque-des-Arcs
- Location within France Location within Occitanie
- Coordinates: 44°28′36″N 1°28′07″E
- Country: France
- Region: Occitania
- Department: Lot
- Arrondissement: Cahors
- Canton: Cahors-2
- Commune: Bellefont-La Rauze
- Area^{1}: 7.69 km^{2} (2.97 sq mi)
- Elevation: 116 m (381 ft)
- Highest elevation: 331 m (1,086 ft)
- Lowest elevation: 110 m (360 ft)
- Population (2022): 457
  - Density: 59.4/km^{2} (154/sq mi)
- Time zone: UTC+01:00 (CET)
  - Summer (DST): UTC+02:00 (CEST)
- Postal code: 46090
- ^{1} French Land Register data, which excludes lakes, ponds, glaciers > 1 km^{2} (0.386 sq mi or 247 acres) and river estuaries.

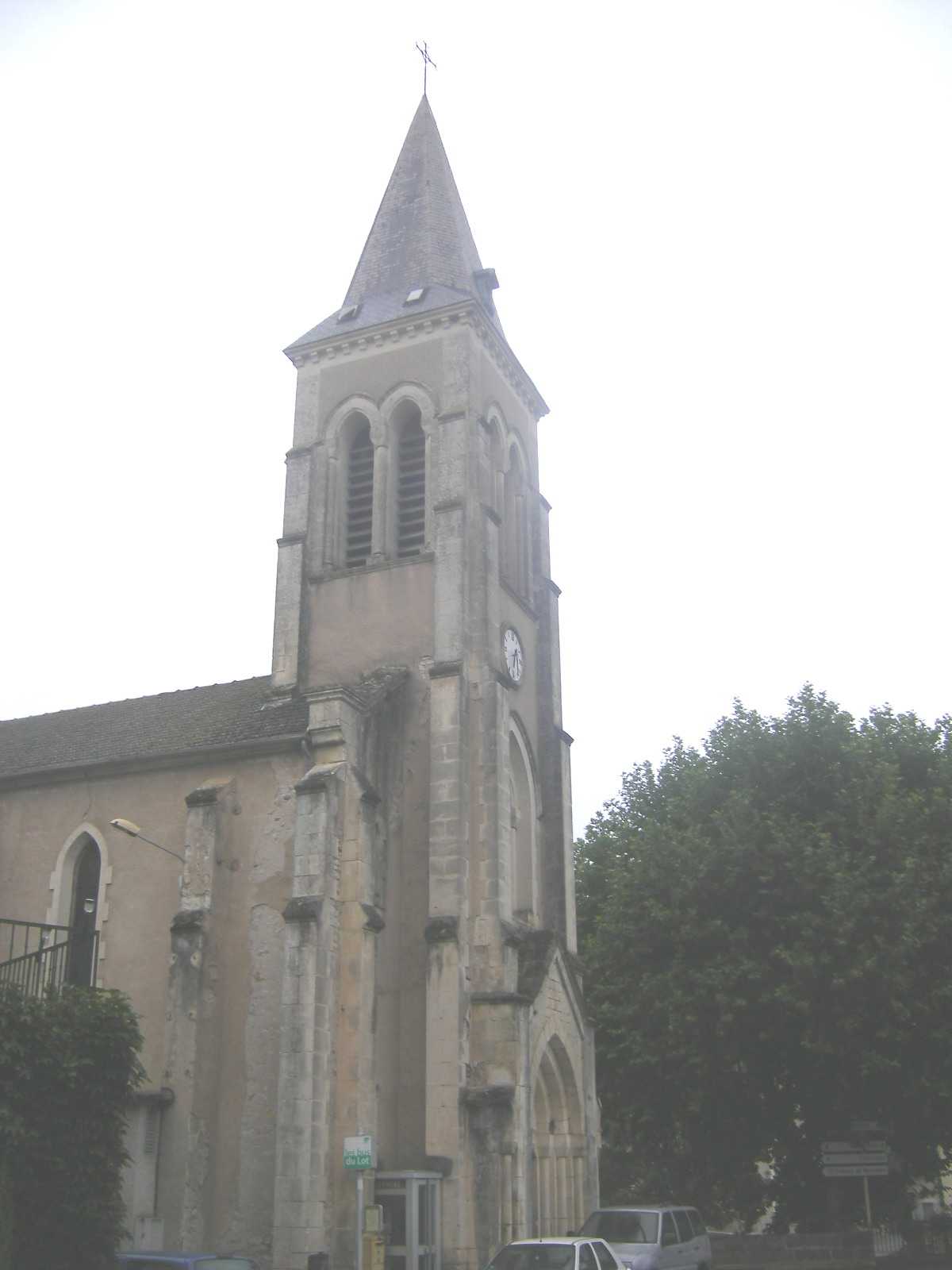
Church in Laroque-des-Arcs

Laroque-des-Arcs (French pronunciation: [laʁɔk de.z‿aʁk]; Languedocien: La Ròca dels Arcs) is a former commune in the Lot department in south-western France. On 1 January 2017, it was merged into the new commune Bellefont-La Rauze.

== See also ==
- Communes of the Lot department
