= Cours, Lot =

Cours
- Part of Bellefont-La Rauze
- Location of Cours
- Location within France Location within Occitanie
- Coordinates: 44°31′11″N 1°32′30″E
- Country: France
- Region: Occitania
- Department: Lot
- Arrondissement: Cahors
- Canton: Cahors-2
- Commune: Bellefont-La Rauze
- Area^{1}: 17.05 km^{2} (6.58 sq mi)
- Elevation: 354 m (1,161 ft)
- Highest elevation: 364 m (1,194 ft)
- Lowest elevation: 140 m (460 ft)
- Population (2022): 289
  - Density: 17.0/km^{2} (43.9/sq mi)
- Time zone: UTC+01:00 (CET)
  - Summer (DST): UTC+02:00 (CEST)
- Postal code: 46090
- ^{1} French Land Register data, which excludes lakes, ponds, glaciers > 1 km^{2} (0.386 sq mi or 247 acres) and river estuaries.

Cours (Languedocien: Corts) is a former commune in the Lot department in south-western France. On 1 January 2017, it was merged into the new commune Bellefont-La Rauze. Its population was 289 in 2022.

== See also ==
- Communes of the Lot department
