= Valroufié =

- Part of Bellefont-La Rauze
- Coat of arms
- Location of Valroufié
- Location within France Location within Occitanie
- Coordinates: 44°31′12″N 1°29′19″E
- Country: France
- Region: Occitania
- Department: Lot
- Arrondissement: Cahors
- Canton: Cahors-2
- Commune: Bellefont-La Rauze
- Area^{1}: 13.43 km^{2} (5.19 sq mi)
- Elevation: 298 m (978 ft)
- Highest elevation: 361 m (1,184 ft)
- Lowest elevation: 140 m (460 ft)
- Population (2022): 442
  - Density: 32.9/km^{2} (85.2/sq mi)
- Time zone: UTC+01:00 (CET)
  - Summer (DST): UTC+02:00 (CEST)
- Postal code: 46090
- ^{1} French Land Register data, which excludes lakes, ponds, glaciers > 1 km^{2} (0.386 sq mi or 247 acres) and river estuaries.

Valroufié (French pronunciation: [valʁufje]; Languedocien: Valrofièr) is a former commune in the Lot department in south-western France. On 1 January 2017, it was merged into the new commune Bellefont-La Rauze. Its population was 442 in 2022.

== See also ==
- Communes of the Lot department
