= Château de Calamane =

Castle in Calamane, France

Coordinates: 44.5231°N 1.3940°E

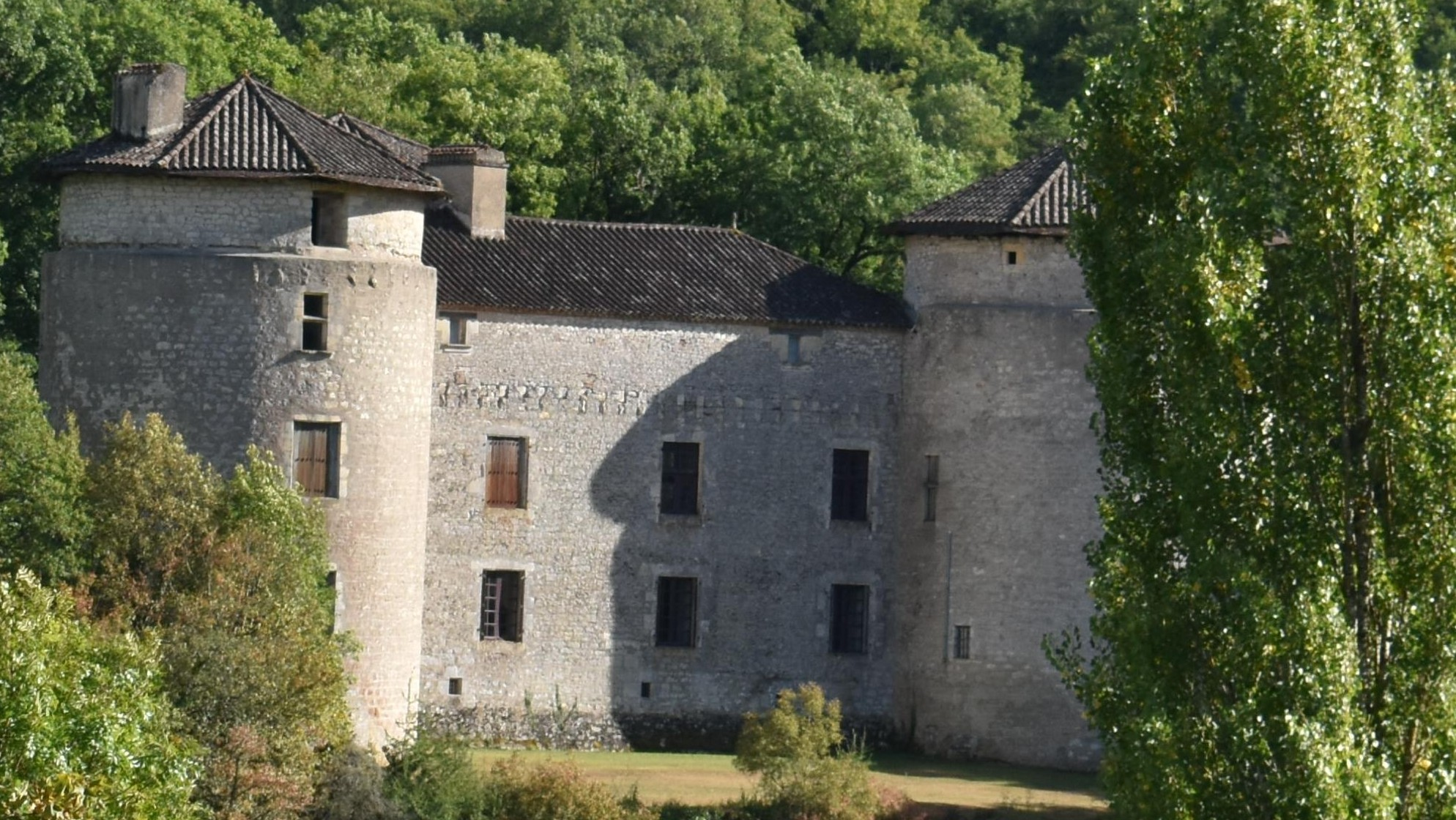

The Château de Calamane is a castle in the commune of Calamane in the Lot département of France.

The castle was built at the end of the 15th century and was sold as a national property in 1796. It is formed of a quadrangular corps de logis flanked on the north side by two large cylindrical towers; the tops were removed during the French Revolution. The south side is flanked by a polygonal tower with a spiral staircase. The entrance doorway and the bay which opens above it, are framed with pinnacled pilasters and decorated with cabbages.

The castle has suffered much damage and deterioration over the centuries, from the Hundred Years' War to the French Revolution. The ruins were bought in 1862 by the great-great-grandfather of the present owner, who has restored it.

Inside are chimney places and a plafond à la française (French-style ceiling: joists the same width as the spaces between them; see Plafond à la française in French Wikipedia).

The Château de Calamane is privately owned. It has been listed since 1929 as a monument historique by the French Ministry of Culture. Though not generally open to the public, parts are opened on special heritage days.

== See also ==
- List of castles in France
