= Ussel, Lot =

Ussel
- Commune
- Location of Ussel
- Location within France Location within Occitanie
- Coordinates: 44°35′39″N 1°30′02″E
- Country: France
- Region: Occitania
- Department: Lot
- Arrondissement: Gourdon
- Canton: Causse et Bouriane

Government
  - Mayor (2020–2026): Annie Sourzat
- Area^{1}: 6.74 km^{2} (2.60 sq mi)
- Elevation: 400 m (1,300 ft)
- Highest elevation: 421 m (1,381 ft)
- Lowest elevation: 292 m (958 ft)
- Population (2023): 94
  - Density: 14/km^{2} (36/sq mi)
- Time zone: UTC+01:00 (CET)
  - Summer (DST): UTC+02:00 (CEST)
- INSEE/Postal code: 46323 /46240
- ^{1} French Land Register data, which excludes lakes, ponds, glaciers > 1 km^{2} (0.386 sq mi or 247 acres) and river estuaries.

Ussel (French pronunciation: [ysɛl]; Occitan: Ussèl) is a commune in the Lot department in south-western France.

== See also ==
- Communes of the Lot department
