= Arcambal =

- Commune
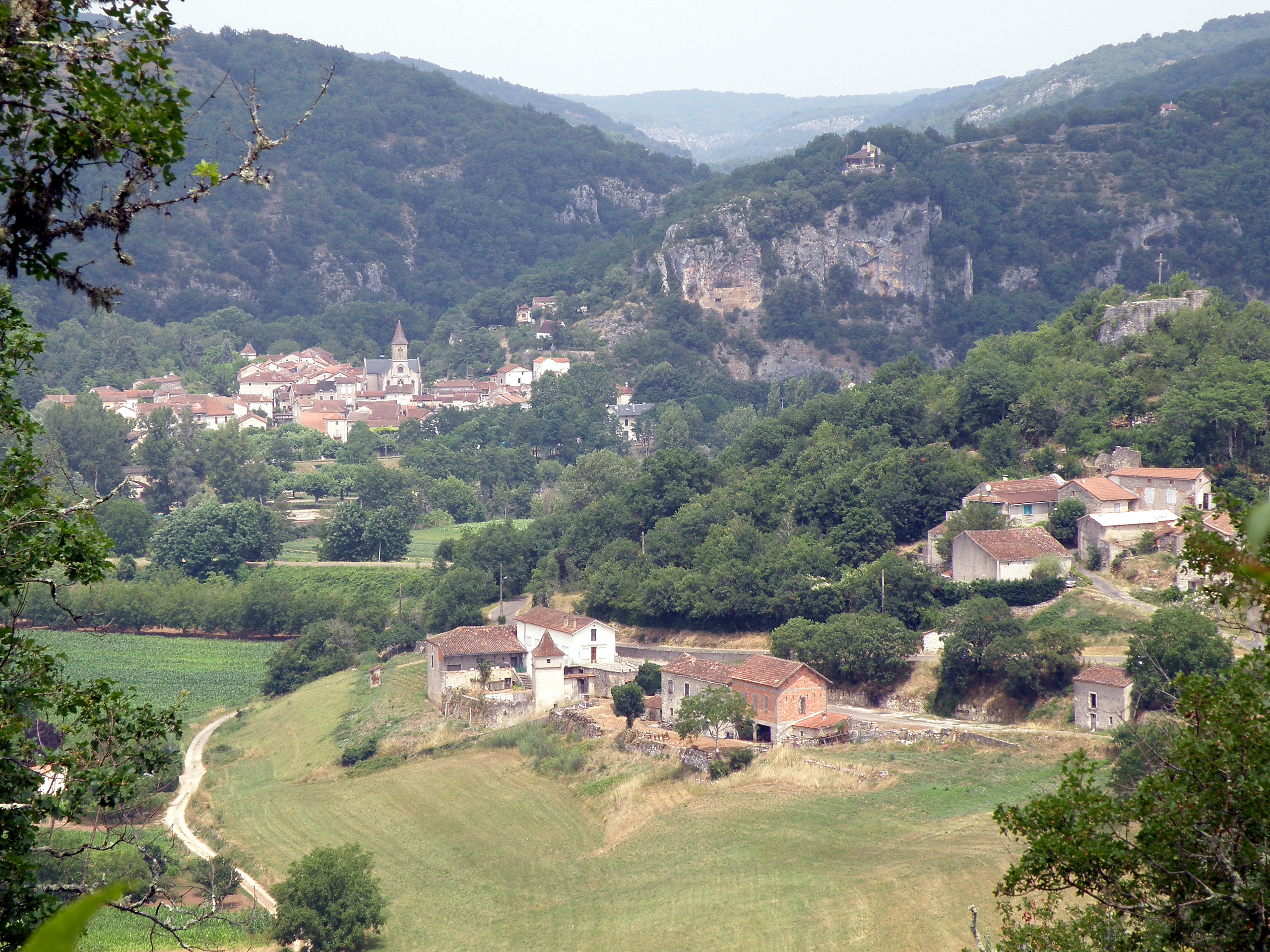
- A general view of Arcambal
- Location of Arcambal
- Location within France Location within Occitanie
- Coordinates: 44°27′25″N 1°30′53″E
- Country: France
- Region: Occitania
- Department: Lot
- Arrondissement: Cahors
- Canton: Cahors-2
- Intercommunality: CA Grand Cahors

Government
  - Mayor (2020–2026): Jérôme Dietsch
- Area^{1}: 23.11 km^{2} (8.92 sq mi)
- Elevation: 75 m (246 ft)
- Highest elevation: 342 m (1,122 ft)
- Lowest elevation: 110 m (360 ft)
- Population (2023): 1,004
  - Density: 43.44/km^{2} (112.5/sq mi)
- Time zone: UTC+01:00 (CET)
  - Summer (DST): UTC+02:00 (CEST)
- INSEE/Postal code: 46007 /46090
- ^{1} French Land Register data, which excludes lakes, ponds, glaciers > 1 km^{2} (0.386 sq mi or 247 acres) and river estuaries.

Arcambal (French pronunciation: [aʁkɑ̃bal]; Languedocien: Arcambald) is a commune in the Lot department in southwestern France.

== Population ==
Historical population
Year	Pop.	±% p.a.
1968	409	—
1975	413	+0.14%
1982	535	+3.77%
1990	637	+2.21%
1999	735	+1.60%
2007	871	+2.14%
2012	1,013	+3.07%
2017	994	−0.38%
2023	1,004	+0.17%
Source: INSEE

== See also ==
- Communes of the Lot department
