= Francoulès =

- Commune
- Coat of arms
- Location of Francoulès
- Location within France Location within Occitanie
- Coordinates: 44°32′40″N 1°29′25″E
- Country: France
- Region: Occitania
- Department: Lot
- Arrondissement: Cahors
- Canton: Causse et Bouriane
- Intercommunality: CA Grand Cahors

Government
  - Mayor (2020–2026): Jean-Luc Guillemot
- Area^{1}: 13.61 km^{2} (5.25 sq mi)
- Elevation: 357 m (1,171 ft)
- Highest elevation: 410 m (1,350 ft)
- Lowest elevation: 203 m (666 ft)
- Population (2023): 265
  - Density: 19.5/km^{2} (50.4/sq mi)
- Time zone: UTC+01:00 (CET)
  - Summer (DST): UTC+02:00 (CEST)
- INSEE/Postal code: 46112 /46090
- ^{1} French Land Register data, which excludes lakes, ponds, glaciers > 1 km^{2} (0.386 sq mi or 247 acres) and river estuaries.

Francoulès (French pronunciation: [fʁɑ̃kulɛs]; Occitan: Francolès) is a commune in the Lot department in south-western France.

== See also ==
- Communes of the Lot department
