= Gigouzac =

- Commune
- Location of Gigouzac
- Location within France Location within Occitanie
- Coordinates: 44°35′03″N 1°26′05″E
- Country: France
- Region: Occitania
- Department: Lot
- Arrondissement: Cahors
- Canton: Causse et Bouriane
- Intercommunality: CA Grand Cahors

Government
  - Mayor (2020–2026): Romuald Molinie
- Area^{1}: 9.91 km^{2} (3.83 sq mi)
- Elevation: 220 m (720 ft)
- Highest elevation: 376 m (1,234 ft)
- Lowest elevation: 210 m (690 ft)
- Population (2023): 303
  - Density: 30.6/km^{2} (79.2/sq mi)
- Time zone: UTC+01:00 (CET)
  - Summer (DST): UTC+02:00 (CEST)
- INSEE/Postal code: 46119 /46150
- ^{1} French Land Register data, which excludes lakes, ponds, glaciers > 1 km^{2} (0.386 sq mi or 247 acres) and river estuaries.

Gigouzac is a commune in the Lot department in south-western France.

== See also ==
- Communes of the Lot department
