= Soucirac =

- Commune
- Location of Soucirac
- Location within France Location within Occitanie
- Coordinates: 44°42′12″N 1°30′16″E
- Country: France
- Region: Occitania
- Department: Lot
- Arrondissement: Gourdon
- Canton: Causse et Bouriane
- Intercommunality: Quercy-Bouriane

Government
  - Mayor (2020–2026): Marie-Françoise Talayssat
- Area^{1}: 11.31 km^{2} (4.37 sq mi)
- Highest elevation: 434 m (1,424 ft)
- Lowest elevation: 247 m (810 ft)
- Population (2023): 102
  - Density: 9.02/km^{2} (23.4/sq mi)
- Time zone: UTC+01:00 (CET)
  - Summer (DST): UTC+02:00 (CEST)
- INSEE/Postal code: 46308 /46300
- ^{1} French Land Register data, which excludes lakes, ponds, glaciers > 1 km^{2} (0.386 sq mi or 247 acres) and river estuaries.

Soucirac (French pronunciation: [susiʁak]; Occitan: Socirac) is a commune in the Lot department in south-western France.

== See also ==
- Communes of the Lot department
