= Communauté d'agglomération du Grand Cahors =

Grand Cahors
- Communauté d'agglomération
- Interactive map of Grand Cahors
- Coordinates: 44°29′N 01°27′E
- Country: France
- Region: Occitania
- Department: Lot
- No. of communes: {{{nbcomm}}}
- Established: 2009
- Area: 593.2 km^{2} (229.0 sq mi)
- Population (2019): 41,795
  - Density: 70.46/km^{2} (182.5/sq mi)
- Website: cahorsagglo.fr

Communauté d'agglomération du Grand Cahors is the communauté d'agglomération, an intercommunal structure, centred on the town of Cahors. It is located in the Lot department, in the Occitania region, southern France. Created in 2009, its seat is in Cahors. Its area is 593.2 km^{2}. Its population was 41,795 in 2019, of which 19,937 in Cahors proper.

== Composition ==
The communauté d'agglomération consists of the following 36 communes:

1. Arcambal
2. Bellefont-La Rauze
3. Boissières
4. Bouziès
5. Cabrerets
6. Cahors
7. Caillac
8. Calamane
9. Catus
10. Cieurac
11. Crayssac
12. Douelle
13. Espère
14. Fontanes
15. Francoulès
16. Gigouzac
17. Les Junies
18. Labastide-du-Vert
19. Labastide-Marnhac
20. Lamagdelaine
21. Lherm
22. Maxou
23. Mechmont
24. Mercuès
25. Le Montat
26. Montgesty
27. Nuzéjouls
28. Pontcirq
29. Pradines
30. Saint-Cirq-Lapopie
31. Saint-Denis-Catus
32. Saint Géry-Vers
33. Saint-Médard
34. Saint-Pierre-Lafeuille
35. Tour-de-Faure
36. Trespoux-Rassiels
