= Crayssac =

- Commune
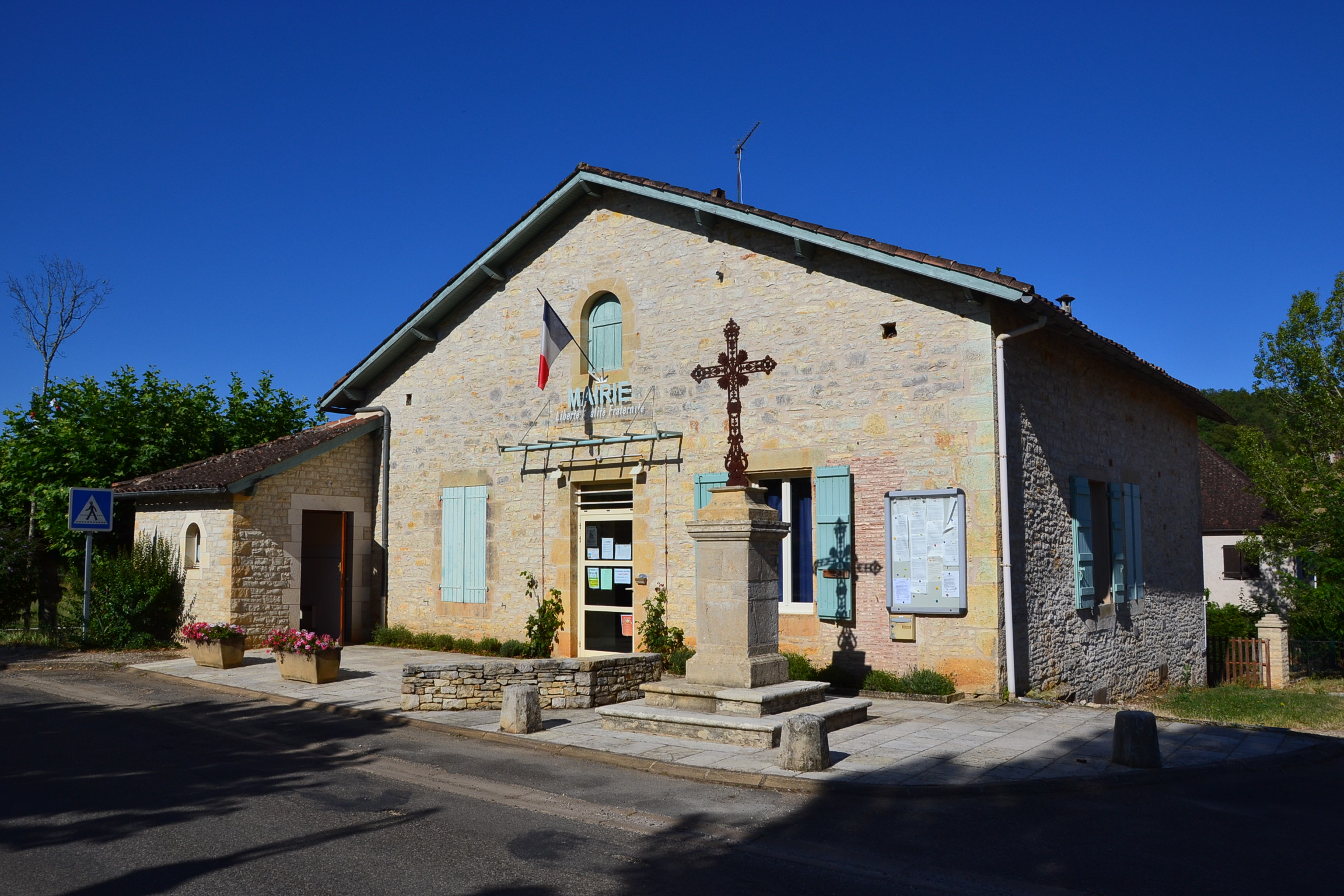
- Town hall
- Location of Crayssac
- Location within France Location within Occitanie
- Coordinates: 44°30′38″N 1°19′42″E
- Country: France
- Region: Occitania
- Department: Lot
- Arrondissement: Cahors
- Canton: Causse et Bouriane
- Intercommunality: CA Grand Cahors

Government
  - Mayor (2020–2026): Christian Cazabonne
- Area^{1}: 14.95 km^{2} (5.77 sq mi)
- Elevation: 300 m (980 ft)
- Highest elevation: 303 m (994 ft)
- Lowest elevation: 100 m (330 ft)
- Population (2023): 844
  - Density: 56.5/km^{2} (146/sq mi)
- Time zone: UTC+01:00 (CET)
  - Summer (DST): UTC+02:00 (CEST)
- INSEE/Postal code: 46080 /46150
- ^{1} French Land Register data, which excludes lakes, ponds, glaciers > 1 km^{2} (0.386 sq mi or 247 acres) and river estuaries.

Crayssac (French pronunciation: [kʁɛsak]; Occitan: Craissac) is a commune in the Lot department in south-western France.

== See also ==
- Communes of the Lot department
