= Pradines, Lot =

Pradines
- Commune
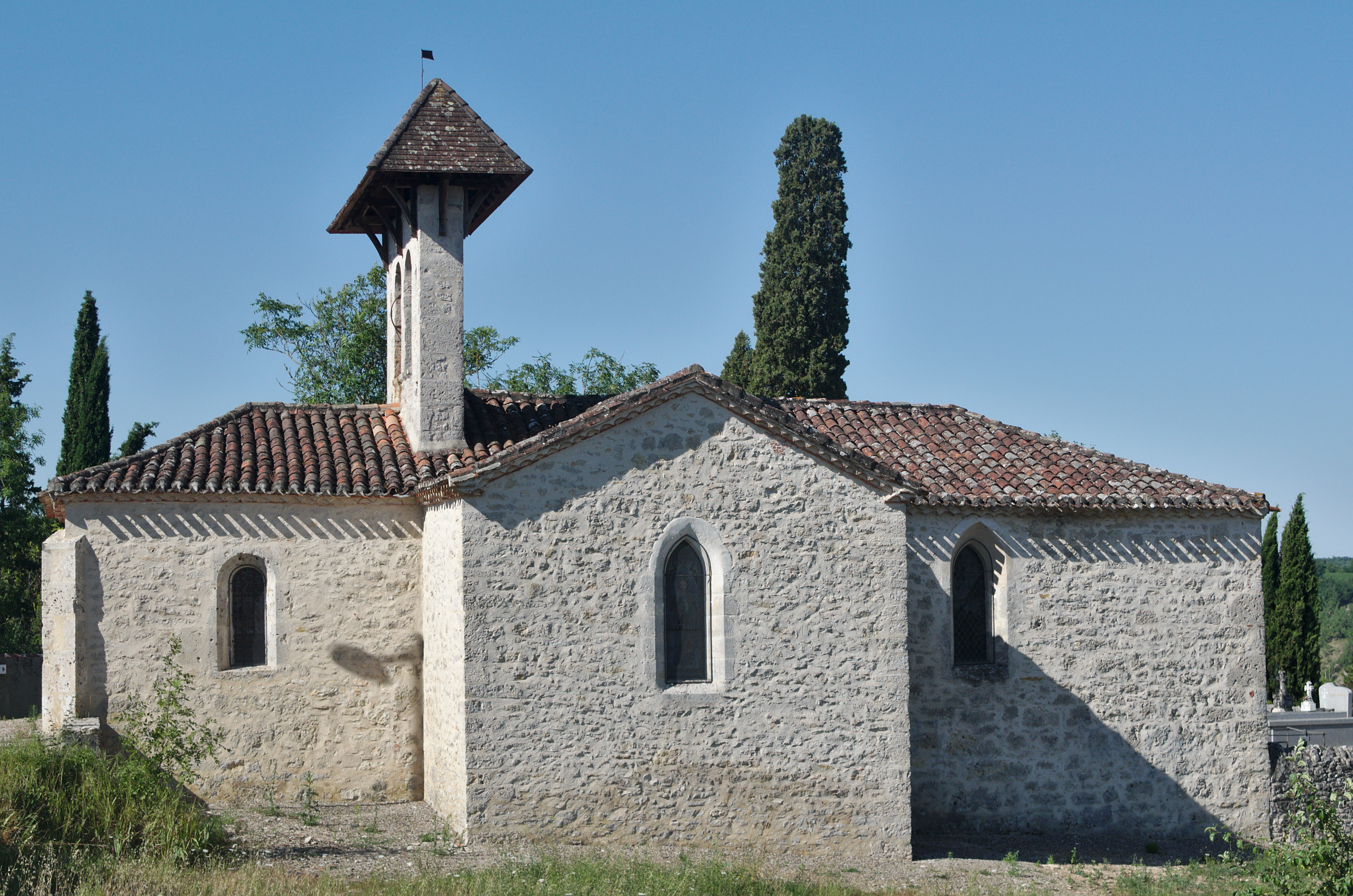
- The church of Saint-Blaise de Flottes
- Location of Pradines
- Location within France Location within Occitanie
- Coordinates: 44°28′47″N 1°24′18″E
- Country: France
- Region: Occitania
- Department: Lot
- Arrondissement: Cahors
- Canton: Cahors-1
- Intercommunality: CA Grand Cahors

Government
  - Mayor (2020–2026): Denis Marre
- Area^{1}: 16.49 km^{2} (6.37 sq mi)
- Elevation: 139 m (456 ft)
- Highest elevation: 300 m (980 ft)
- Lowest elevation: 100 m (330 ft)
- Population (2023): 3,617
  - Density: 219.3/km^{2} (568.1/sq mi)
- Time zone: UTC+01:00 (CET)
  - Summer (DST): UTC+02:00 (CEST)
- INSEE/Postal code: 46224 /46090
- ^{1} French Land Register data, which excludes lakes, ponds, glaciers > 1 km^{2} (0.386 sq mi or 247 acres) and river estuaries.

Pradines (French pronunciation: [pʁadin]; Occitan: Pradinas) is a commune in the Lot department in south-western France.

== Population ==
Historical population
Year	Pop.	±% p.a.
1968	703	—
1975	1,206	+8.02%
1982	2,307	+9.71%
1990	2,941	+3.08%
1999	3,125	+0.68%
2007	3,224	+0.39%
2012	3,514	+1.74%
2017	3,467	−0.27%
2023	3,617	+0.71%
Source: INSEE

== See also ==
- Communes of the Lot department
