= Thédirac =

- Commune
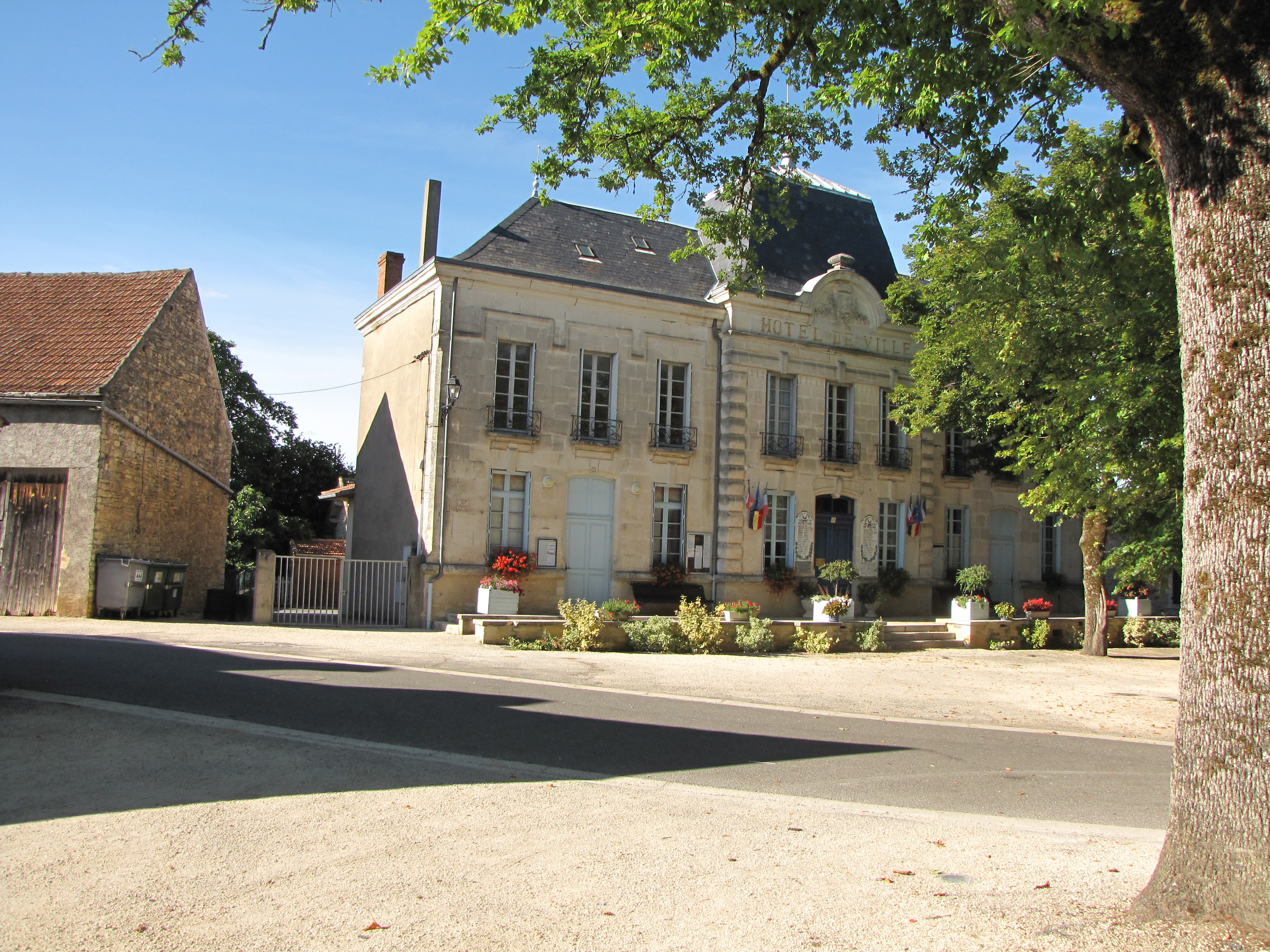
- The town hall in Thédirac
- Location of Thédirac
- Location within France Location within Occitanie
- Coordinates: 44°36′06″N 1°19′06″E
- Country: France
- Region: Occitania
- Department: Lot
- Arrondissement: Gourdon
- Canton: Causse et Bouriane
- Intercommunality: Cazals-Salviac

Government
  - Mayor (2020–2026): Jean-Marie Cournac
- Area^{1}: 16.51 km^{2} (6.37 sq mi)
- Elevation: 270 m (890 ft)
- Highest elevation: 332 m (1,089 ft)
- Lowest elevation: 205 m (673 ft)
- Population (2023): 303
  - Density: 18.4/km^{2} (47.5/sq mi)
- Time zone: UTC+01:00 (CET)
  - Summer (DST): UTC+02:00 (CEST)
- INSEE/Postal code: 46316 /46150
- ^{1} French Land Register data, which excludes lakes, ponds, glaciers > 1 km^{2} (0.386 sq mi or 247 acres) and river estuaries.

Thédirac (French pronunciation: [tediʁak]; Occitan: Tedirac) is a commune in the Lot department in south-western France.

The town contains the Church of Saint Roch, a prime example of a fortified medieval church. Historical displays inside the church state that it was remodeled and enlarged in the 13th and 14th centuries CE, but its main structure dates to the 11th century and the base of the chevet (structure with the altar and apse) is much older.

A 2022 census from the Institut National de la Statistique et des Études Économiques places the population of Thédirac at 298.

== See also ==
- Communes of the Lot department
