= Labastide-du-Vert =

Labastide-du-Vert La Bastida del Vèrn (Occitan)
- Commune
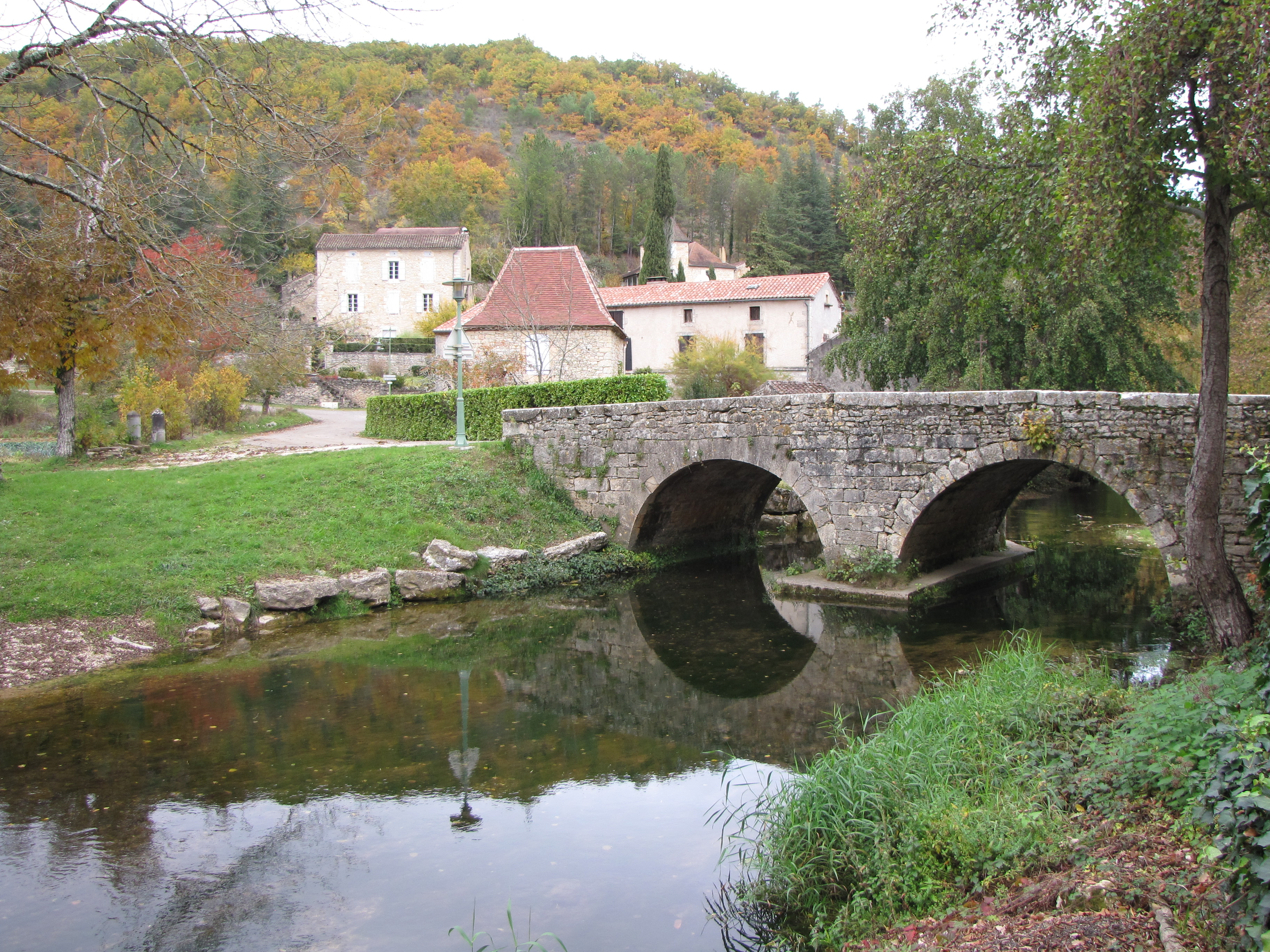
- The old bridge over the Vert, in Labastide-du-Vert
- Location of Labastide-du-Vert
- Location within France Location within Occitanie
- Coordinates: 44°30′45″N 1°15′47″E
- Country: France
- Region: Occitania
- Department: Lot
- Arrondissement: Cahors
- Canton: Causse et Bouriane
- Intercommunality: CA Grand Cahors

Government
  - Mayor (2020–2026): Hélène Soliveres
- Area^{1}: 10.44 km^{2} (4.03 sq mi)
- Elevation: 121 m (397 ft)
- Highest elevation: 283 m (928 ft)
- Lowest elevation: 102 m (335 ft)
- Population (2023): 279
  - Density: 26.7/km^{2} (69.2/sq mi)
- Time zone: UTC+01:00 (CET)
  - Summer (DST): UTC+02:00 (CEST)
- INSEE/Postal code: 46136 /46150
- ^{1} French Land Register data, which excludes lakes, ponds, glaciers > 1 km^{2} (0.386 sq mi or 247 acres) and river estuaries.

Labastide-du-Vert (Occitan: La Bastida del Vèrn) is a commune in the Lot department in the Occitania region in Southwestern France. As of 2023, the population of the commune was 279.

== Notable people ==
- Henri-Jean Guillaume Martin (1860–1943), painter, died in Labastide-du-Vert

== See also ==
- Communes of the Lot department
