= John Gabriel Perboyre =

French Roman Catholic saint

Saint John Gabriel Perboyre CM
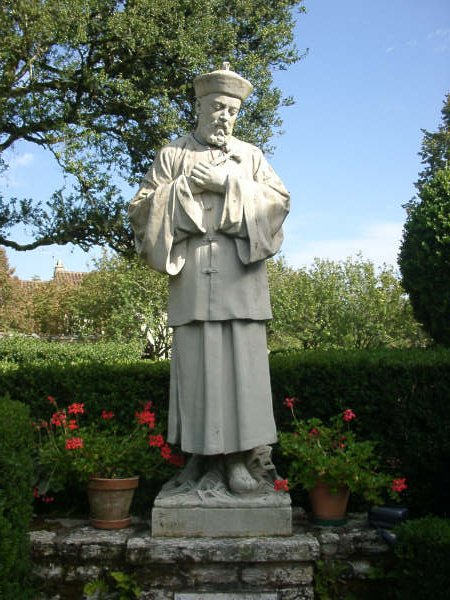
- Statue of St. John Gabriel Perboyre

Martyr
- Born: 6 January 1802; Le Puech, Montgesty, Lot, France
- Died: 11 September 1840 (aged 38); Wuchang, Hubei, Imperial China
- Venerated in: Catholic Church
- Beatified: 10 November 1889, Rome, Kingdom of Italy, by Pope Leo XIII
- Canonized: 2 June 1996, Vatican City by Pope John Paul II
- Major shrine: Motherhouse of the Congregation of the Mission, Paris, France
- Feast: 11 September

John Gabriel Perboyre, CM (French: Jean-Gabriel Perboyre; 1802–1840) was a French Catholic priest of the Congregation of the Mission (Vincentians or Lazarists) who served as a missionary in China, where he suffered martyrdom. He was canonized in 1996 by Pope John Paul II.

== Life ==
=== Early life ===
Perboyre was born in 1802 at Le Puech (now in the commune of Montgesty), Lot, France, one of eight children born to Pierre Perboyre and Marie Rigal, who ran a farm. (Five of them would enter either the Vincentian Fathers or the Daughters of Charity.) He led a routine childhood and youth, displaying no particular religious fervor. This changed in 1816, however, after his younger brother, Louis, was accepted into the Vincentian seminary recently founded in Montauban by their uncle, Jacques Perboyre, C.M. John Gabriel was asked by their parents to accompany his brother until he had adapted to his new environment. To his surprise, John Gabriel felt drawn to follow this life himself.

When the teachers at the minor seminary saw John Gabriel's intelligence and piety, they suggested that he enroll formally in the seminary. He wrote to his father, offering to return to help on the farm should his father wish, but indicating that he felt that he was called to serve as a priest. His parents gave him their blessing and full support in this.

=== Apostolic life ===
John Gabriel entered the novitiate of the Congregation of the Mission established in the premises of the minor seminary of Montauban in December 1818. On the feast of the Holy Innocents 1820, he made the Congregation's four promises, hoping to serve in its overseas missions. He was ordained to the priesthood on 23 September 1825, in the chapel of the Daughters of Charity, by Louis Dubourg, an experienced Sulpician missionary bishop newly returned to France and installed as the Bishop of Montauban. On the following day Perboyre celebrated Mass for the first time. In 1832 he was assigned by the superiors of the Congregation to supervise the novitiate in Paris.

John Gabriel Perboyre had been held back from his longing to serve in China by his poor health. His brother Louis, on the other hand, was sent by the Congregation of the Mission to China, but died during the journey. This prompted John Gabriel to volunteer to replace his brother. His request was accepted, the hope being that the sea voyage would improve his uncertain health.

=== Missionary ===
Perboyre arrived in Macau in August 1835, where he began the study of the Chinese language. On 21 December 1835, he began his journey to Henan in China, the mission assigned him, in a junk ship. The journey took him five months, which required months of recovery. He then proceeded to spend the rest of his time of service serving the poverty-stricken people of the region. In January 1838, he was transferred to the mission of Hubei. In September 1839, persecutions against Christians broke out in Hubei, and Perboyre was one of the first victims.

In 1839 the viceroy of the province began a persecution and used the local mandarins to obtain the names of priests and catechists in their areas. In September 1839, the Mandarin of Hubei, possibly 周天爵(Zhou Tianjue/Dsou-tien-ziau), where there was a Vincentian mission center, sent soldiers to arrest the missionaries. Perboyre was meeting informally with some other priests of the region when the soldiers arrived to seize them. The priests scattered and hid, but one catechist, under torture, gave away where Perboyre was hiding. When seized, the priest was stripped of his garments and clothed with rags, bound, and, over the course of time, was dragged from tribunal to tribunal. At each trial, he was treated inhumanly. Finally, he was taken to Wuchang, and after torture, was condemned to death.

The sentence was confirmed by an imperial edict in 1840, and on 11 September of that year, Perboyre was led to death with seven common criminals. He was strangled to death on a cross at Wuchang. His body was retrieved and buried in the mission cemetery by a catechist.

== Veneration ==
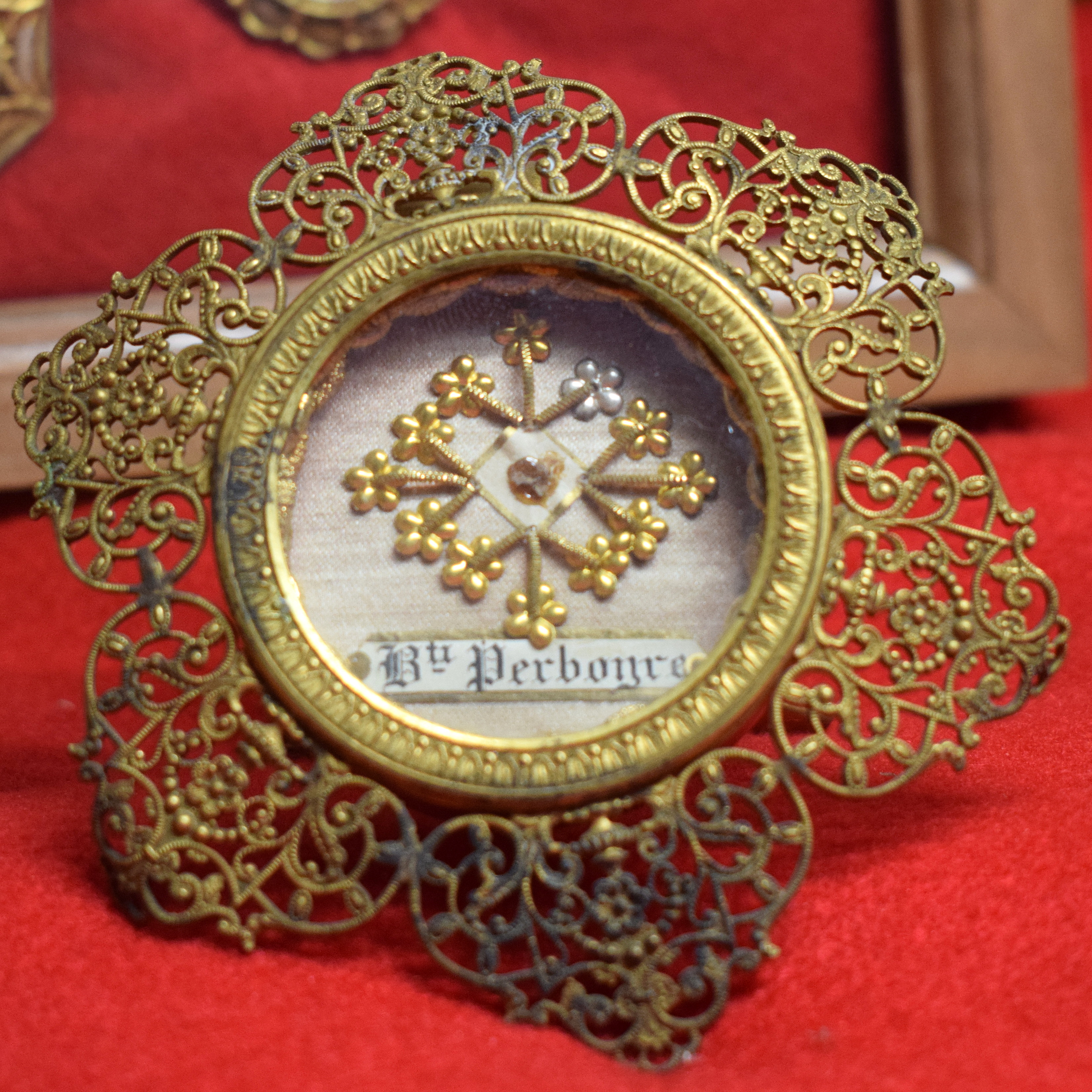
A relic of St John Gabriel Perboyre publicly venerated at a basilica in Ohio

The cause for John Gabriel Perboyre's beatification was admitted by the Holy See once the statutory waiting period of five years after death had passed. He was eventually beatified by Pope Leo XIII in Rome on 10 November 1889, and the cause for his canonization was formally opened on 11 March 1891. The canonization by Pope John Paul II took place on 2 June 1996. In the meantime, his remains were returned from China to France, where they were entombed for veneration in the chapel of the Vincentian Motherhouse in Paris, Saint Vincent de Paul Chapel.

== Prayer of St. John Gabriel Perboyre to Jesus ==
Saint John Gabriel Perboyre composed this prayer in the 19th century. This transformational prayer builds towards Saint Paul's statement in Galatians 2:20: "I live – now not I – But Christ lives in me".

O my Divine Savior,
Transform me into Yourself.
May my hands be the hands of Jesus.
Grant that every faculty of my body
May serve only to glorify You.

Above all,
Transform my soul and all its powers
So that my memory, will and affection
May be the memory, will and affections
Of Jesus.

I pray You
To destroy in me
All that is not of You.
Grant that I may live
But in You, by You and for You,
So that I may truly say,
With St. Paul,
"I live – now not I –
But Christ lives in me".
