= Saint-Médard, Lot =

Saint-Médard
- Commune
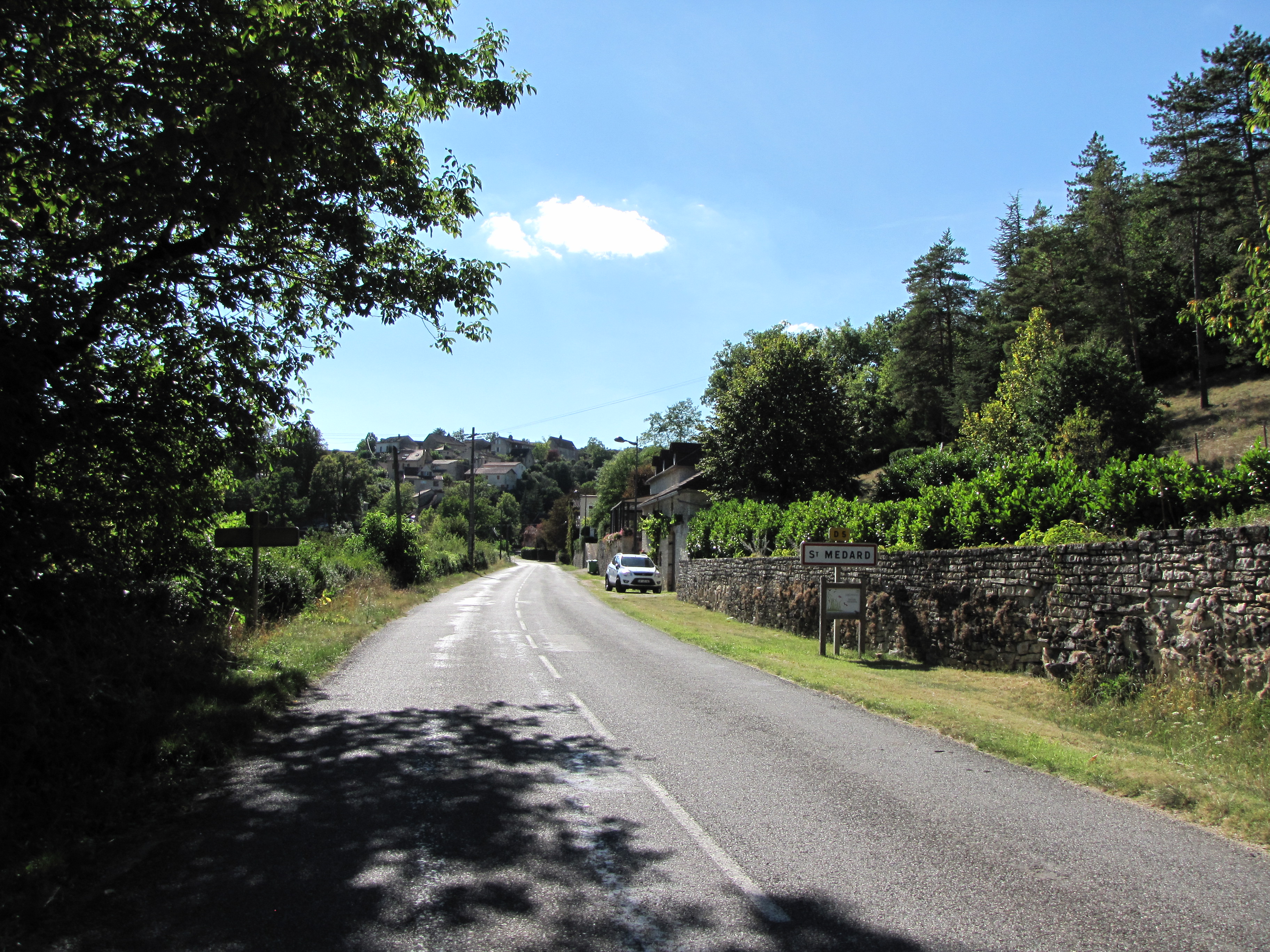
- The road into Saint-Médard
- Location of Saint-Médard
- Location within France Location within Occitanie
- Coordinates: 44°32′21″N 1°17′42″E
- Country: France
- Region: Occitania
- Department: Lot
- Arrondissement: Cahors
- Canton: Causse et Bouriane
- Intercommunality: CA Grand Cahors

Government
  - Mayor (2020–2026): Pascal Corniot
- Area^{1}: 11.78 km^{2} (4.55 sq mi)
- Elevation: 139 m (456 ft)
- Highest elevation: 298 m (978 ft)
- Lowest elevation: 120 m (390 ft)
- Population (2023): 198
  - Density: 16.8/km^{2} (43.5/sq mi)
- Time zone: UTC+01:00 (CET)
  - Summer (DST): UTC+02:00 (CEST)
- INSEE/Postal code: 46280 /46150
- ^{1} French Land Register data, which excludes lakes, ponds, glaciers > 1 km^{2} (0.386 sq mi or 247 acres) and river estuaries.

Saint-Médard (French pronunciation: [sɛ̃ medaʁ]; Languedocien: Sant Miard) is a commune in the Lot department in south-western France.

== See also ==
- Communes of the Lot department
