= Saint-Pierre-Lafeuille =

- Commune
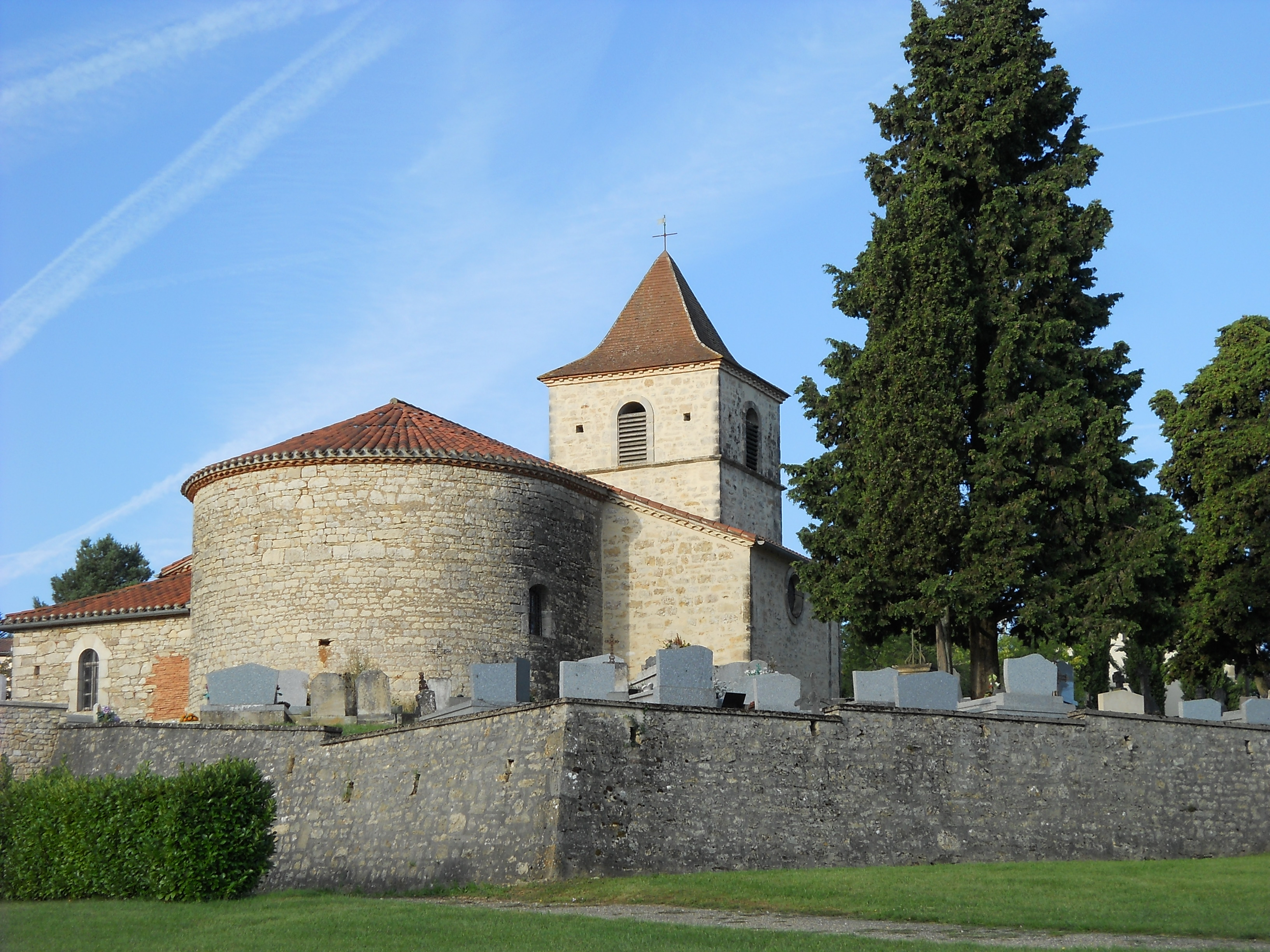
- The church in Saint-Pierre-Lafeuille
- Location of Saint-Pierre-Lafeuille
- Location within France Location within Occitanie
- Coordinates: 44°31′28″N 1°27′16″E
- Country: France
- Region: Occitania
- Department: Lot
- Arrondissement: Cahors
- Canton: Causse et Bouriane
- Intercommunality: CA Grand Cahors

Government
  - Mayor (2020–2026): Frédéric Bonnet
- Area^{1}: 8.52 km^{2} (3.29 sq mi)
- Elevation: 300 m (980 ft)
- Highest elevation: 361 m (1,184 ft)
- Lowest elevation: 154 m (505 ft)
- Population (2023): 419
  - Density: 49.2/km^{2} (127/sq mi)
- Time zone: UTC+01:00 (CET)
  - Summer (DST): UTC+02:00 (CEST)
- INSEE/Postal code: 46340 /46090
- ^{1} French Land Register data, which excludes lakes, ponds, glaciers > 1 km^{2} (0.386 sq mi or 247 acres) and river estuaries.

Saint-Pierre-Lafeuille (French pronunciation: [sɛ̃ pjɛʁ lafœj]; Languedocien: Sent Pèire de la Fuèlha) is a commune in the Lot department in south-western France.

== See also ==
- Communes of the Lot department
