= Mechmont =

- Commune
- Location of Mechmont
- Location within France Location within Occitanie
- Coordinates: 44°34′45″N 1°27′01″E
- Country: France
- Region: Occitania
- Department: Lot
- Arrondissement: Cahors
- Canton: Causse et Bouriane
- Intercommunality: CA Grand Cahors

Government
  - Mayor (2020–2026): Stéphane Pons
- Area^{1}: 6.71 km^{2} (2.59 sq mi)
- Elevation: 320 m (1,050 ft)
- Highest elevation: 383 m (1,257 ft)
- Lowest elevation: 236 m (774 ft)
- Population (2023): 134
  - Density: 20.0/km^{2} (51.7/sq mi)
- Time zone: UTC+01:00 (CET)
  - Summer (DST): UTC+02:00 (CEST)
- INSEE/Postal code: 46190 /46150
- ^{1} French Land Register data, which excludes lakes, ponds, glaciers > 1 km^{2} (0.386 sq mi or 247 acres) and river estuaries.

Mechmont is a commune in the Lot département in south-western France.

== Population ==
Historical population
Year	Pop.	±% p.a.
1968	102	—
1975	105	+0.41%
1982	109	+0.54%
1990	103	−0.71%
1999	105	+0.21%
2007	115	+1.14%
2012	116	+0.17%
2017	125	+1.51%
2023	134	+1.17%
Source: INSEE

== See also ==
- Communes of the Lot department
