= Bellefont-La Rauze =

- Commune
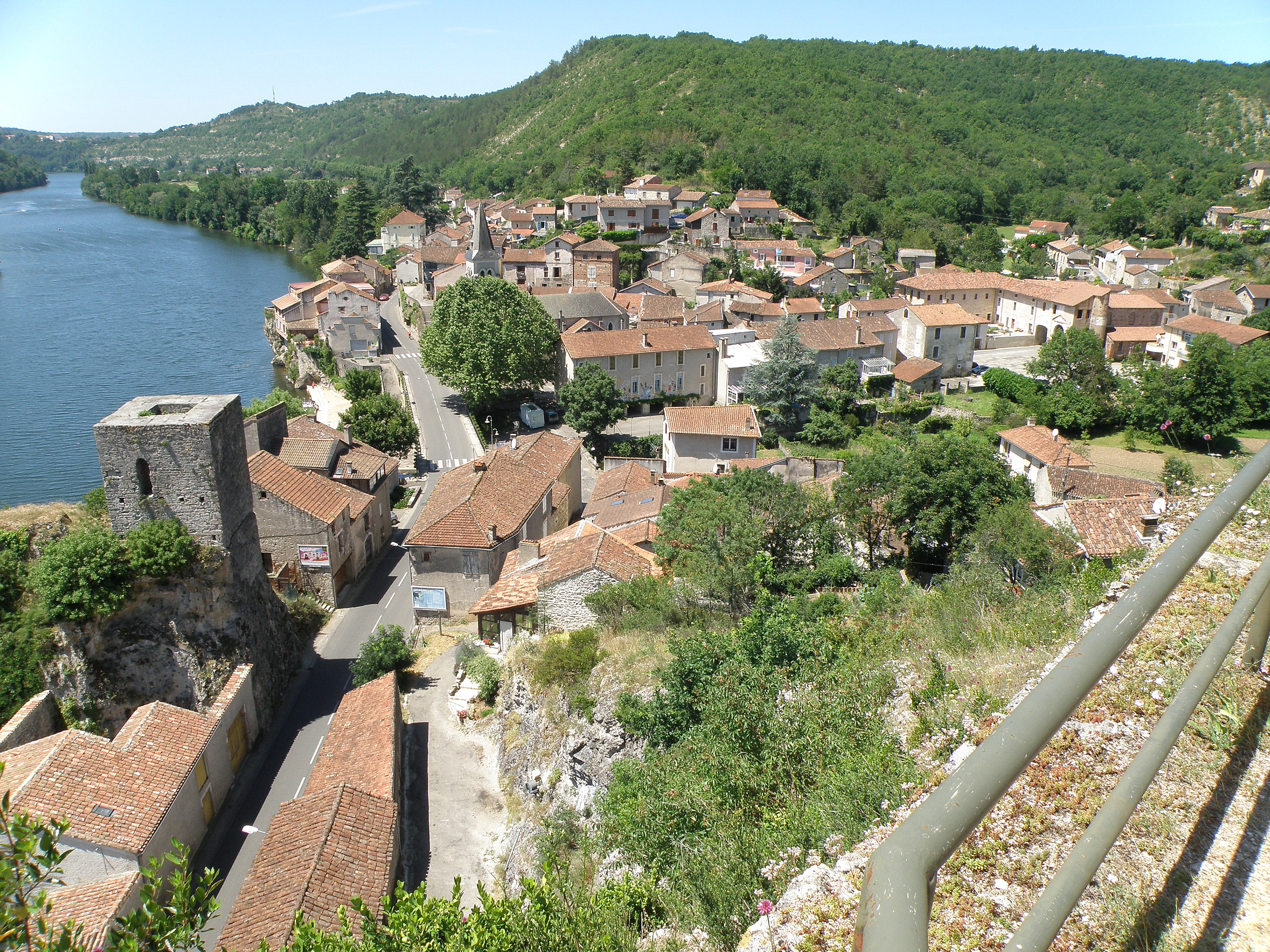
- A general view of Laroque-des-Arcs
- Location of Bellefont-La Rauze
- Location within France Location within Occitanie
- Coordinates: 44°28′34″N 1°28′05″E
- Country: France
- Region: Occitania
- Department: Lot
- Arrondissement: Cahors
- Canton: Cahors-2
- Intercommunality: CA Grand Cahors

Government
  - Mayor (2024–2026): Thierry Vallier
- Area^{1}: 38.22 km^{2} (14.76 sq mi)
- Population (2023): 1,183
  - Density: 30.95/km^{2} (80.17/sq mi)
- Time zone: UTC+01:00 (CET)
  - Summer (DST): UTC+02:00 (CEST)
- INSEE/Postal code: 46156 /46090
- ^{1} French Land Register data, which excludes lakes, ponds, glaciers > 1 km^{2} (0.386 sq mi or 247 acres) and river estuaries.

Bellefont-La Rauze is a commune in the department of Lot, southern France. The municipality was established on 1 January 2017 by merger of the former communes of Laroque-des-Arcs (the seat), Cours and Valroufié.

== See also ==
- Communes of the Lot department
