= Espère =

- Commune
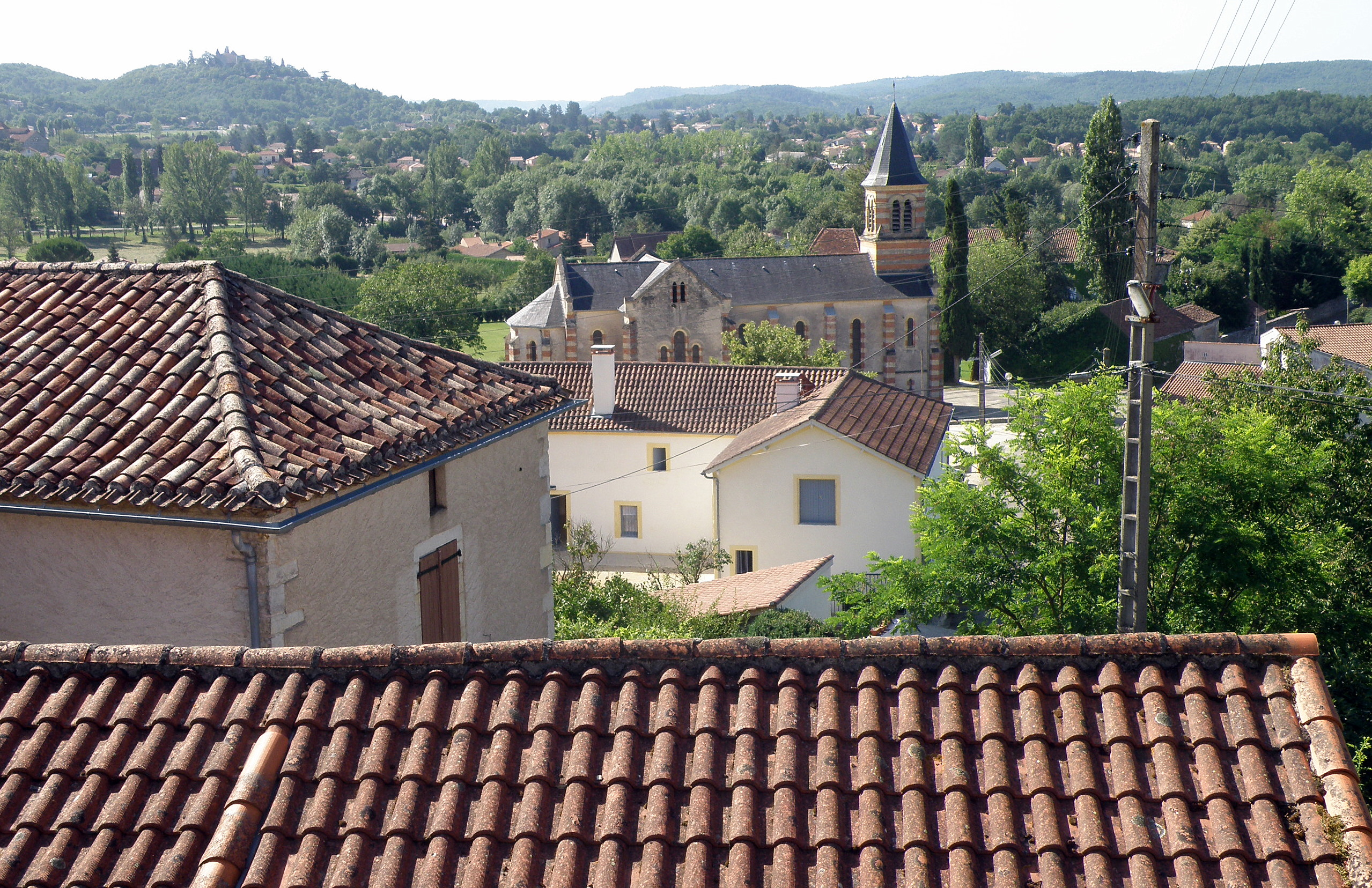
- The church and surrounding buildings in Espère
- Location of Espère
- Location within France Location within Occitanie
- Coordinates: 44°30′38″N 1°22′35″E
- Country: France
- Region: Occitania
- Department: Lot
- Arrondissement: Cahors
- Canton: Causse et Bouriane
- Intercommunality: CA Grand Cahors

Government
  - Mayor (2022–2026): Pierre Canto
- Area^{1}: 6.31 km^{2} (2.44 sq mi)
- Elevation: 21 m (69 ft)
- Highest elevation: 282 m (925 ft)
- Lowest elevation: 120 m (390 ft)
- Population (2023): 963
  - Density: 153/km^{2} (395/sq mi)
- Time zone: UTC+01:00 (CET)
  - Summer (DST): UTC+02:00 (CEST)
- INSEE/Postal code: 46095 /46090
- ^{1} French Land Register data, which excludes lakes, ponds, glaciers > 1 km^{2} (0.386 sq mi or 247 acres) and river estuaries.

Espère (French pronunciation: [ɛspɛʁ]; Languedocien: Espèra) is a commune in the Lot département in south-western France.

== See also ==
- Communes of the Lot department
