= Saint-Denis-Catus =

- Commune
- Location of Saint-Denis-Catus
- Location within France Location within Occitanie
- Coordinates: 44°33′57″N 1°23′35″E
- Country: France
- Region: Occitania
- Department: Lot
- Arrondissement: Cahors
- Canton: Causse et Bouriane
- Intercommunality: CA Grand Cahors

Government
  - Mayor (2020–2026): Sylvie Le Naoures
- Area^{1}: 10.78 km^{2} (4.16 sq mi)
- Elevation: 165 m (541 ft)
- Highest elevation: 337 m (1,106 ft)
- Lowest elevation: 170 m (560 ft)
- Population (2023): 198
  - Density: 18.4/km^{2} (47.6/sq mi)
- Time zone: UTC+01:00 (CET)
  - Summer (DST): UTC+02:00 (CEST)
- INSEE/Postal code: 46264 /46150
- ^{1} French Land Register data, which excludes lakes, ponds, glaciers > 1 km^{2} (0.386 sq mi or 247 acres) and river estuaries.

Saint-Denis-Catus (Languedocien: Sent Daunís de Catús) is a commune in the Lot department in south-western France.

== See also ==
- Communes of the Lot department
