= Peyrilles =

- Commune
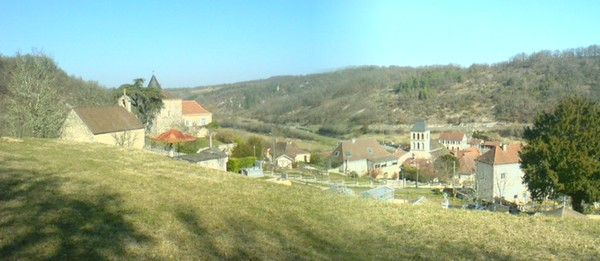
- A general view of Peyrilles

- Coat of arms
- Location of Peyrilles
- Location within France Location within Occitanie
- Coordinates: 44°37′14″N 1°24′54″E
- Country: France
- Region: Occitania
- Department: Lot
- Arrondissement: Gourdon
- Canton: Causse et Bouriane
- Intercommunality: Quercy-Bouriane

Government
  - Mayor (2020–2026): Stéphane Magot
- Area^{1}: 28.41 km^{2} (10.97 sq mi)
- Elevation: 259 m (850 ft)
- Highest elevation: 384 m (1,260 ft)
- Lowest elevation: 188 m (617 ft)
- Population (2023): 347
  - Density: 12.2/km^{2} (31.6/sq mi)
- Time zone: UTC+01:00 (CET)
  - Summer (DST): UTC+02:00 (CEST)
- INSEE/Postal code: 46219 /46310
- ^{1} French Land Register data, which excludes lakes, ponds, glaciers > 1 km^{2} (0.386 sq mi or 247 acres) and river estuaries.

Peyrilles (French pronunciation: [peʁij]; Occitan: Peirilhas) is a commune in the Lot department in south-western France.

Peyrilles whose demonym, *Peyrillacois*, derives from the Occitan name *Peirilhas* lies within the Bouriane, a hilly, sandy natural region covered by forests where chestnut trees are the dominant species.

Subject to a modified oceanic climate, the area is drained by the Ourajoux stream, the Rivalès stream, and various other small watercourses. Situated within the Dordogne river basin, the commune boasts remarkable natural heritage, featuring four areas designated as ZNIEFFs (Natural Zones of Ecological, Faunal, and Floristic Interest).

The pronunciation of Peyrilles is /peʁij/ in the International Phonetic Alphabet.

== Geography ==
A commune in the Quercy region located between Gourdon and Cahors, situated on the Ourajoux stream and along the Les Aubrais-Orléans to Montauban-Ville-Bourbon railway line.

== Demographics ==
Historical population
| Year | Pop. | ±% p.a. |
|---|---|---|
| 1968 | 369 | — |
| 1975 | 336 | −1.33% |
| 1982 | 326 | −0.43% |
| 1990 | 340 | +0.53% |
| 1999 | 313 | −0.92% |
| 2007 | 345 | +1.22% |
| 2012 | 388 | +2.38% |
| 2017 | 354 | −1.82% |
| 2023 | 347 | −0.33% |
Source: INSEE

Having previously reached a population peak of 1511 inhabitants in 1821. It is part of the Cahors catchment area. Its inhabitants are known as *Peyrillais* (masculine) or *Peyrillaises* (feminine).

== Places ==
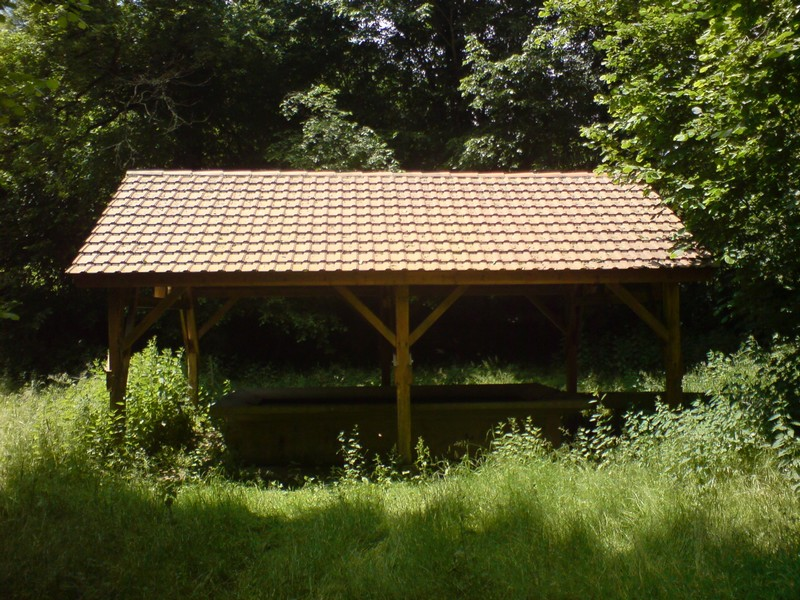
Washing-place of the Dégagnazès

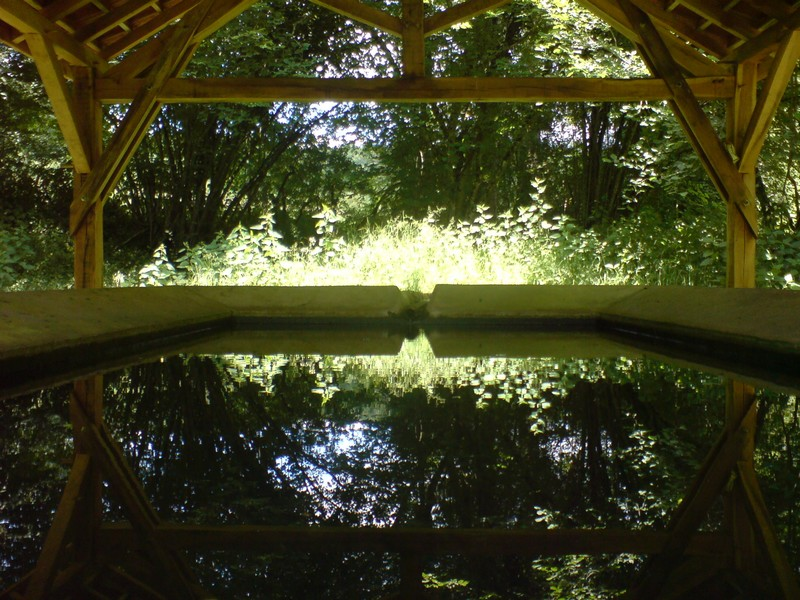
Washing-place Dégagnazès

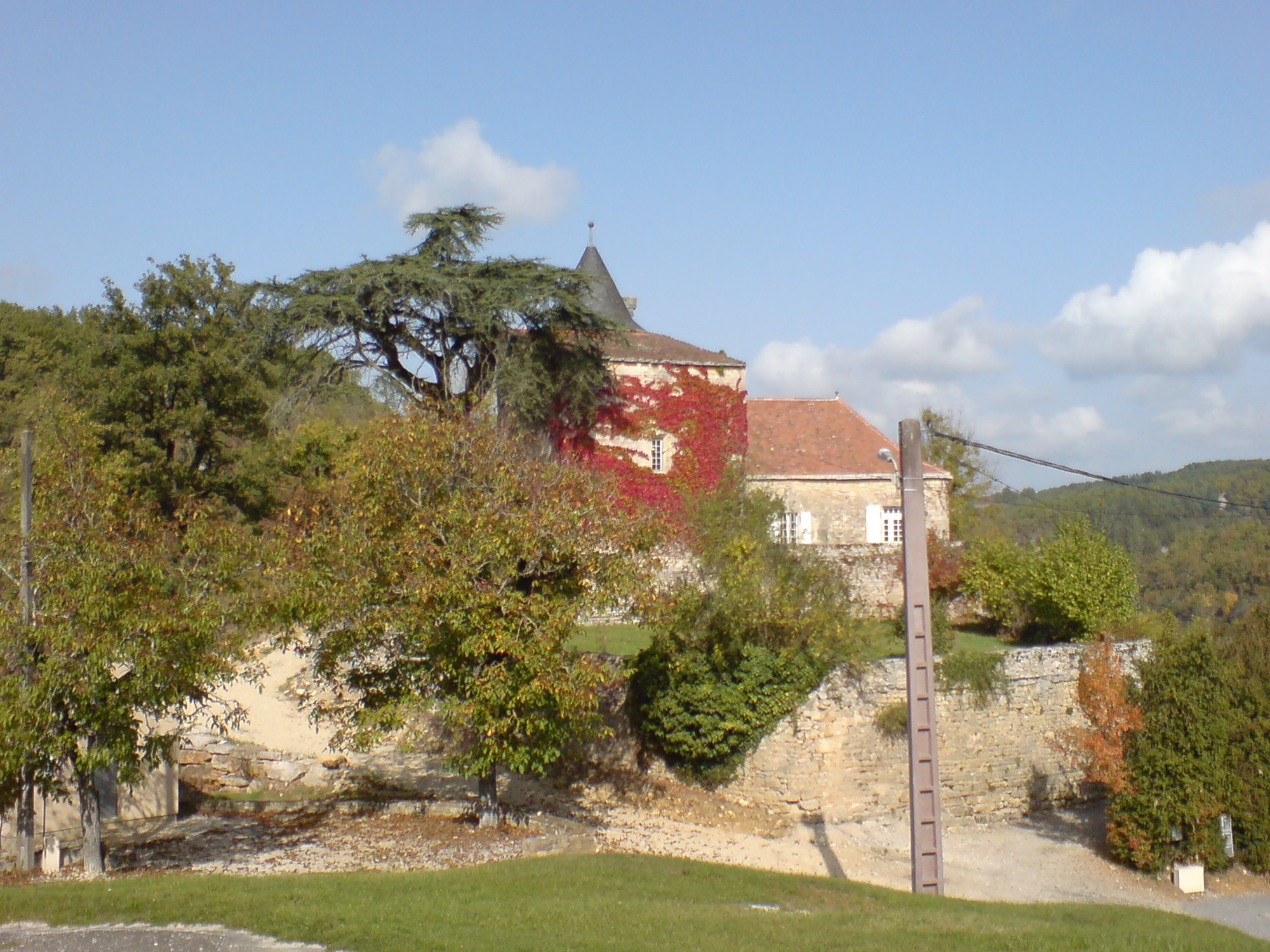
Castel of Peyrilles

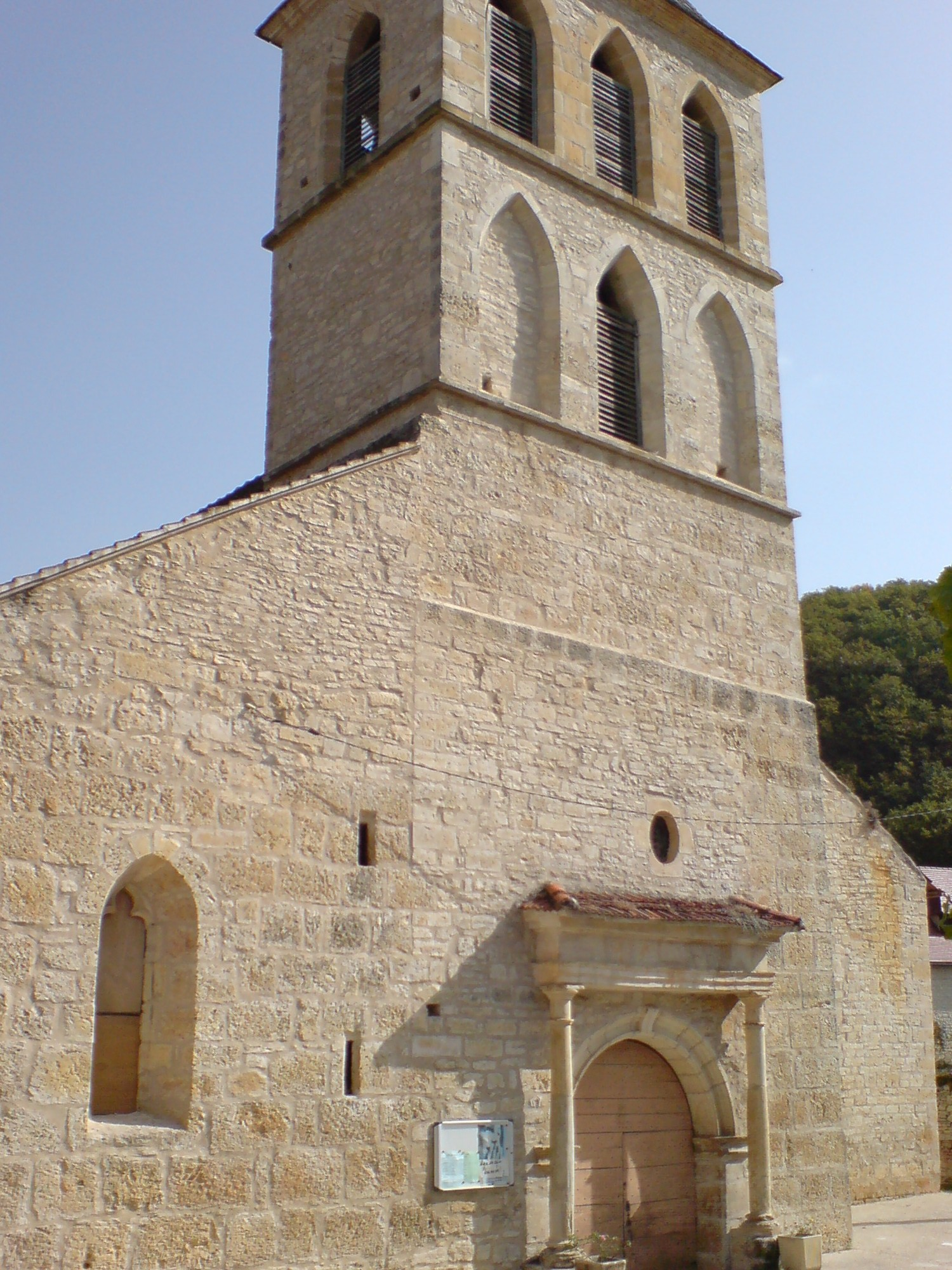
Church of Peyrilles' parish

== See also ==
- Communes of the Lot department
