= Pontcirq =

- Commune
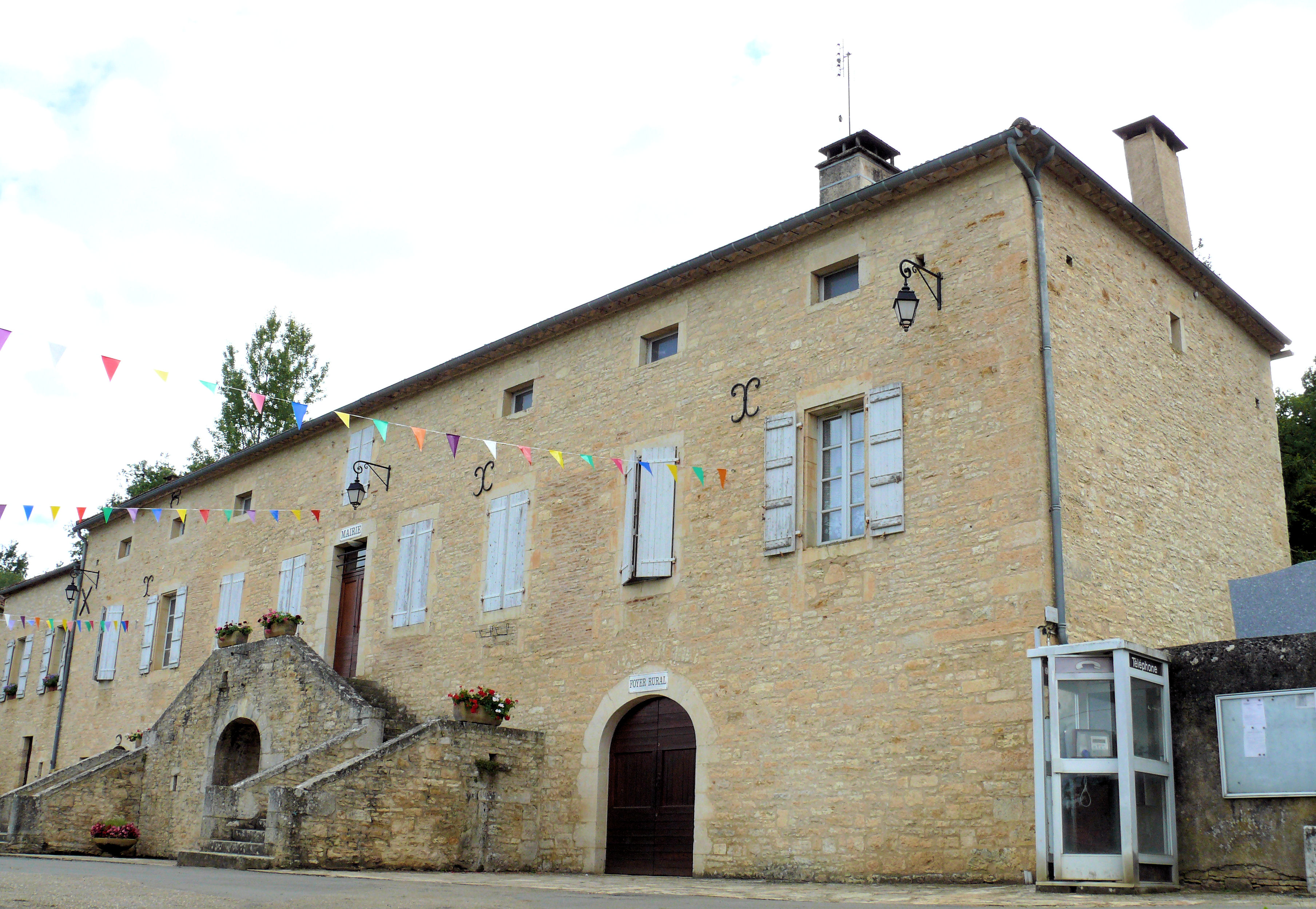
- Town hall and rural home
- Location of Pontcirq
- Location within France Location within Occitanie
- Coordinates: 44°32′57″N 1°15′48″E
- Country: France
- Region: Occitania
- Department: Lot
- Arrondissement: Cahors
- Canton: Causse et Bouriane
- Intercommunality: CA Grand Cahors

Government
  - Mayor (2020–2026): Thierry Chatain
- Area^{1}: 8.94 km^{2} (3.45 sq mi)
- Elevation: 275 m (902 ft)
- Highest elevation: 305 m (1,001 ft)
- Lowest elevation: 120 m (390 ft)
- Population (2023): 178
  - Density: 19.9/km^{2} (51.6/sq mi)
- Time zone: UTC+01:00 (CET)
  - Summer (DST): UTC+02:00 (CEST)
- INSEE/Postal code: 46223 /46150
- ^{1} French Land Register data, which excludes lakes, ponds, glaciers > 1 km^{2} (0.386 sq mi or 247 acres) and river estuaries.

Pontcirq (French pronunciation: [pɔ̃siʁk]; Occitan: Pontcirc) is a commune in the Lot department in south-western France.

== See also ==
- Communes of the Lot department
