= Boissières, Lot =

Boissières
- Commune
- Coat of arms
- Location of Boissières
- Location within France Location within Occitanie
- Coordinates: 44°32′39″N 1°24′05″E
- Country: France
- Region: Occitania
- Department: Lot
- Arrondissement: Cahors
- Canton: Causse et Bouriane
- Intercommunality: CA Grand Cahors

Government
  - Mayor (2020–2026): Willy Parnaudeau
- Area^{1}: 13.03 km^{2} (5.03 sq mi)
- Elevation: 260 m (850 ft)
- Highest elevation: 331 m (1,086 ft)
- Lowest elevation: 150 m (490 ft)
- Population (2023): 371
  - Density: 28.5/km^{2} (73.7/sq mi)
- Time zone: UTC+01:00 (CET)
  - Summer (DST): UTC+02:00 (CEST)
- INSEE/Postal code: 46032 /46150
- ^{1} French Land Register data, which excludes lakes, ponds, glaciers > 1 km^{2} (0.386 sq mi or 247 acres) and river estuaries.

Boissières (French pronunciation: [bwasjɛʁ]; Occitan: Boissièras) is a commune in the Lot department in southwestern France.

== Population ==
Historical population
Year	Pop.	±% p.a.
1968	200	—
1975	219	+1.30%
1982	234	+0.95%
1990	241	+0.37%
1999	312	+2.91%
2007	356	+1.66%
2012	374	+0.99%
2017	397	+1.20%
2023	371	−1.12%
Source: INSEE

== See also ==
- Communes of the Lot department
