= Montamel =

- Commune
- Location of Montamel
- Location within France Location within Occitanie
- Coordinates: 44°36′25″N 1°26′59″E
- Country: France
- Region: Occitania
- Department: Lot
- Arrondissement: Gourdon
- Canton: Causse et Bouriane
- Intercommunality: Quercy-Bouriane

Government
  - Mayor (2020–2026): Jean-François Bélivent
- Area^{1}: 9.61 km^{2} (3.71 sq mi)
- Elevation: 380 m (1,250 ft)
- Highest elevation: 427 m (1,401 ft)
- Lowest elevation: 258 m (846 ft)
- Population (2023): 90
  - Density: 9.4/km^{2} (24/sq mi)
- Time zone: UTC+01:00 (CET)
  - Summer (DST): UTC+02:00 (CEST)
- INSEE/Postal code: 46196 /46310
- ^{1} French Land Register data, which excludes lakes, ponds, glaciers > 1 km^{2} (0.386 sq mi or 247 acres) and river estuaries.

Montamel (French pronunciation: [mɔ̃tamɛl]; Occitan: Montamèl) is a commune in the Lot department in south-western France.

== See also ==
- Communes of the Lot department
