= Canton of Causse et Bouriane =

Coordinates: 44.51°N 1.37°E

The canton of Causse et Bouriane is an administrative division of the Lot department, southern France. It was created at the French canton reorganisation which came into effect in March 2015. Its seat is in Espère.

It consists of the following communes:

1. Boissières
2. Calamane
3. Catus
4. Concorès
5. Crayssac
6. Espère
7. Francoulès
8. Frayssinet
9. Gigouzac
10. Ginouillac
11. Labastide-du-Vert
12. Lamothe-Cassel
13. Maxou
14. Mechmont
15. Montamel
16. Montfaucon
17. Montgesty
18. Nuzéjouls
19. Peyrilles
20. Pontcirq
21. Saint-Chamarand
22. Saint-Denis-Catus
23. Saint-Germain-du-Bel-Air
24. Saint-Médard
25. Saint-Pierre-Lafeuille
26. Séniergues
27. Soucirac
28. Thédirac
29. Ussel
30. Uzech
