= Mercuès =

- Commune
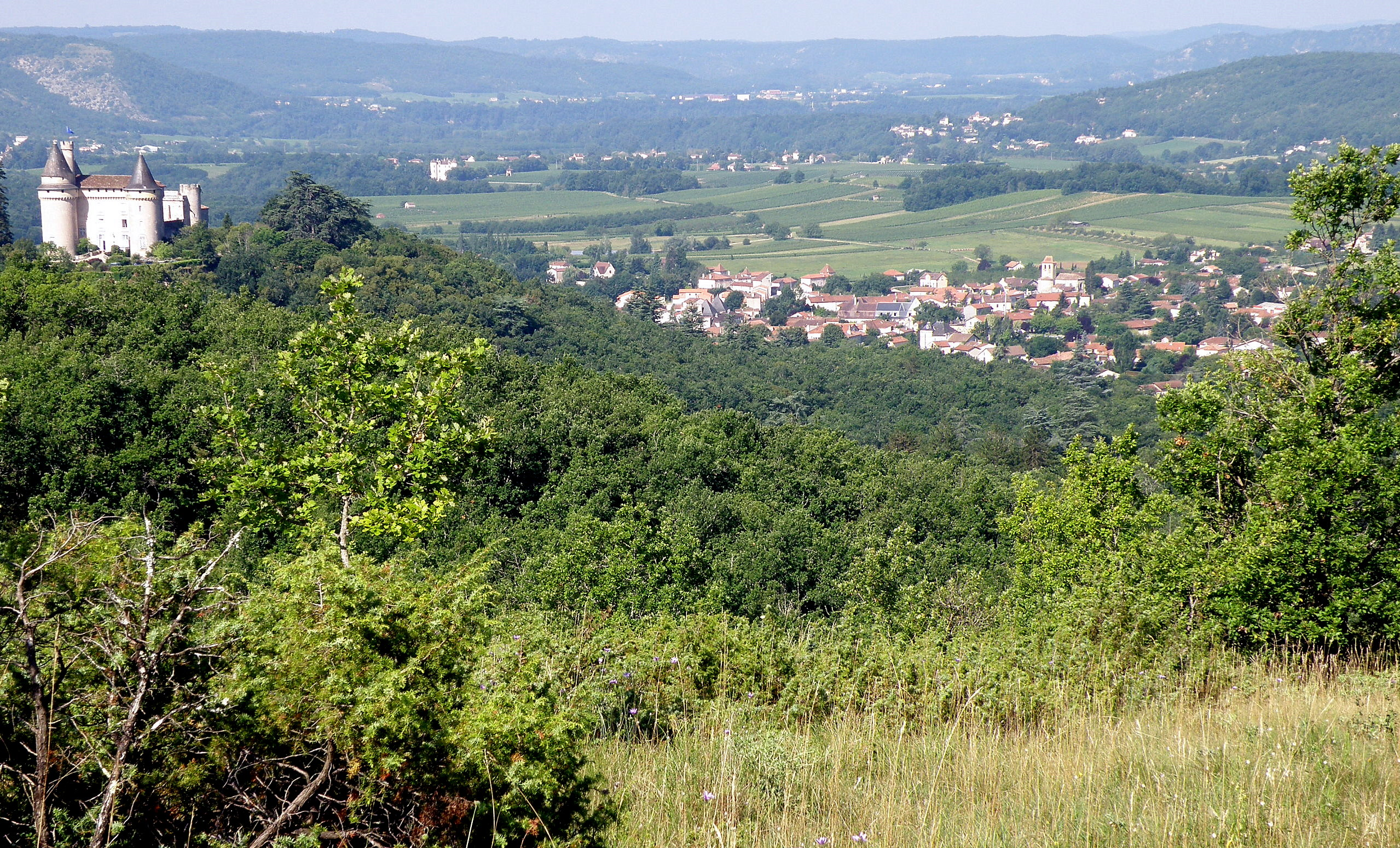
- A general view of Mercuès
- Location of Mercuès
- Location within France Location within Occitanie
- Coordinates: 44°29′53″N 1°23′11″E
- Country: France
- Region: Occitania
- Department: Lot
- Arrondissement: Cahors
- Canton: Cahors-1
- Intercommunality: CA Grand Cahors

Government
  - Mayor (2020–2026): Ludovic Dizengremel
- Area^{1}: 7.24 km^{2} (2.80 sq mi)
- Elevation: 133 m (436 ft)
- Highest elevation: 303 m (994 ft)
- Lowest elevation: 101 m (331 ft)
- Population (2023): 1,122
  - Density: 155/km^{2} (401/sq mi)
- Time zone: UTC+01:00 (CET)
  - Summer (DST): UTC+02:00 (CEST)
- INSEE/Postal code: 46191 /46090
- ^{1} French Land Register data, which excludes lakes, ponds, glaciers > 1 km^{2} (0.386 sq mi or 247 acres) and river estuaries.

Mercuès (French pronunciation: [mɛʁkɥɛs]) is a commune in the Lot department in south-western France.

== See also ==
- Communes of the Lot department
