= Ginouillac =

- Commune
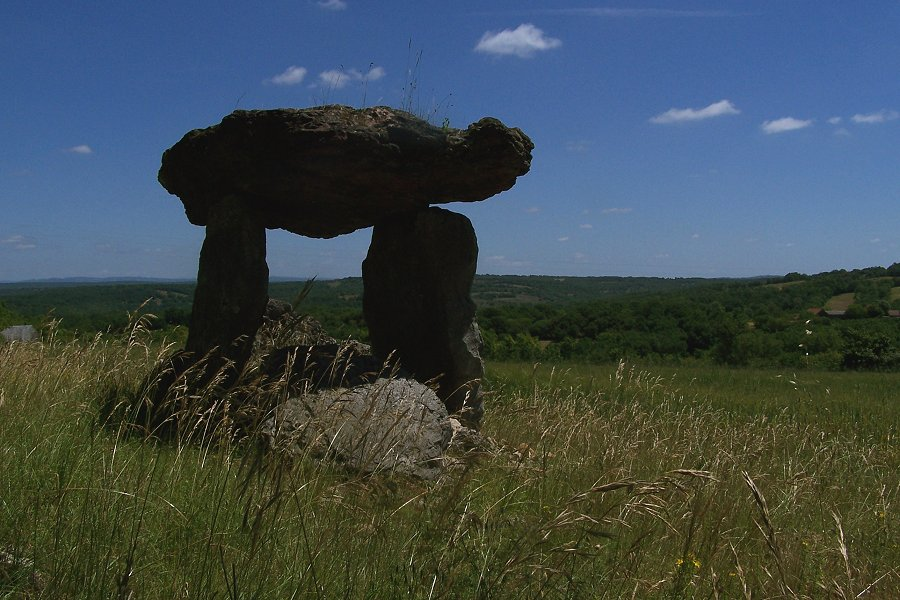
- The Dolmen des Cloups, in Ginouillac

- Coat of arms
- Location of Ginouillac
- Location within France Location within Occitanie
- Coordinates: 44°43′36″N 1°32′21″E
- Country: France
- Region: Occitania
- Department: Lot
- Arrondissement: Gourdon
- Canton: Causse et Bouriane
- Intercommunality: Causse de Labastide-Murat

Government
  - Mayor (2020–2026): Alain Crouzet
- Area^{1}: 9.42 km^{2} (3.64 sq mi)
- Elevation: 350 m (1,150 ft)
- Highest elevation: 446 m (1,463 ft)
- Lowest elevation: 215 m (705 ft)
- Population (2023): 139
  - Density: 14.8/km^{2} (38.2/sq mi)
- Time zone: UTC+01:00 (CET)
  - Summer (DST): UTC+02:00 (CEST)
- INSEE/Postal code: 46121 /46300
- ^{1} French Land Register data, which excludes lakes, ponds, glaciers > 1 km^{2} (0.386 sq mi or 247 acres) and river estuaries.

Ginouillac (French pronunciation: [ʒinujak]; Occitan: Ginolhac) is a commune in the Lot department in southwestern France.

== See also ==
- Communes of the Lot department
