= Catus, Lot =

Catus
- Commune
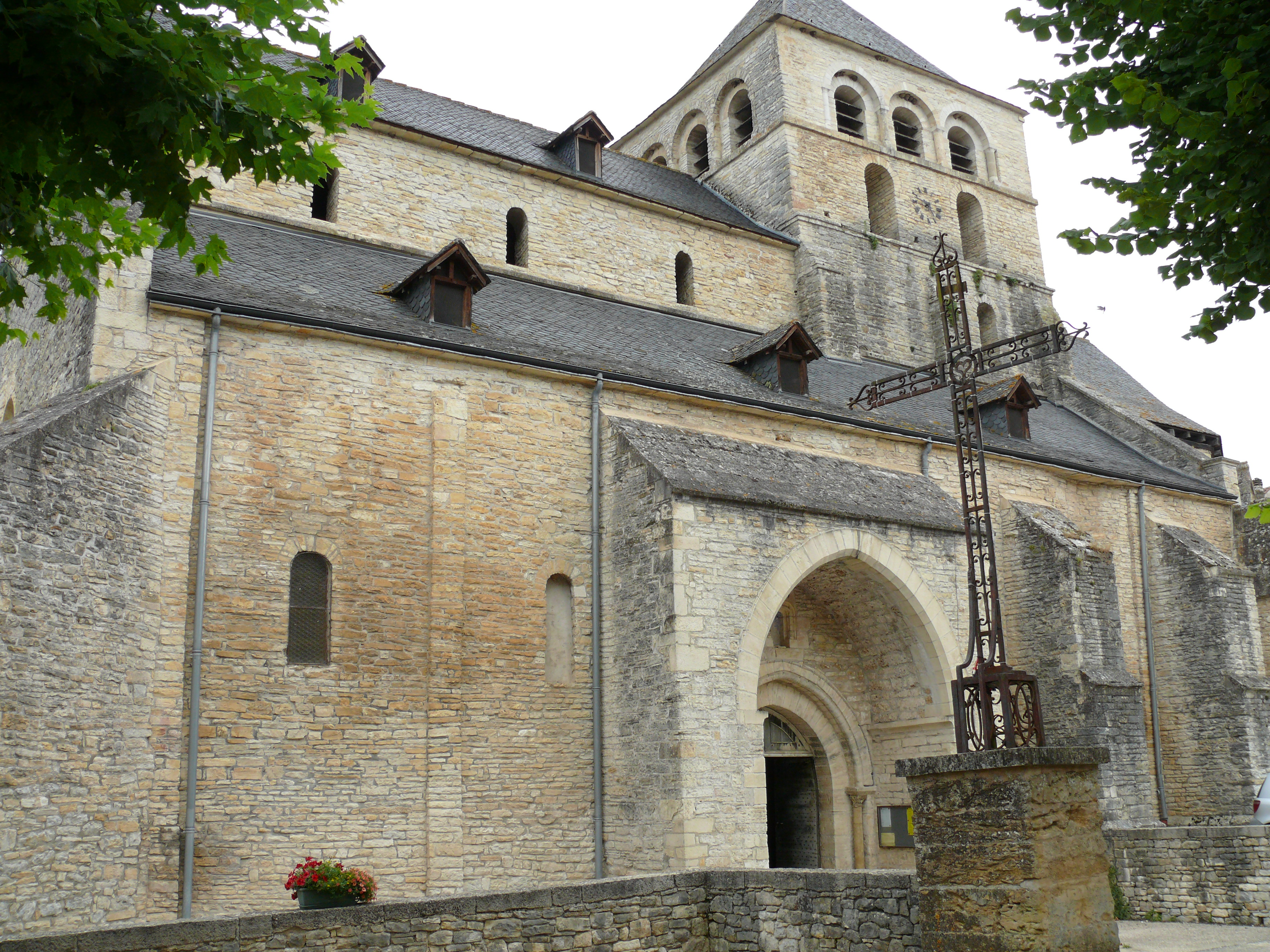
- The church in Catus
- Location of Catus
- Location within France Location within Occitanie
- Coordinates: 44°33′26″N 1°20′16″E
- Country: France
- Region: Occitania
- Department: Lot
- Arrondissement: Cahors
- Canton: Causse et Bouriane
- Intercommunality: CA Grand Cahors

Government
  - Mayor (2020–2026): Olivier Liard
- Area^{1}: 21.32 km^{2} (8.23 sq mi)
- Elevation: 158 m (518 ft)
- Highest elevation: 341 m (1,119 ft)
- Lowest elevation: 130 m (430 ft)
- Population (2023): 921
  - Density: 43.2/km^{2} (112/sq mi)
- Time zone: UTC+01:00 (CET)
  - Summer (DST): UTC+02:00 (CEST)
- INSEE/Postal code: 46064 /46150
- ^{1} French Land Register data, which excludes lakes, ponds, glaciers > 1 km^{2} (0.386 sq mi or 247 acres) and river estuaries.

Catus (Catús in Occitan) is a commune in the Lot department in south-western France.

== See also ==
- Communes of the Lot department
