= Nuzéjouls =

- Commune
- Location of Nuzéjouls
- Location within France Location within Occitanie
- Coordinates: 44°32′23″N 1°22′50″E
- Country: France
- Region: Occitania
- Department: Lot
- Arrondissement: Cahors
- Canton: Causse et Bouriane
- Intercommunality: CA Grand Cahors

Government
  - Mayor (2020–2026): Brigitte Dessertaine
- Area^{1}: 4.74 km^{2} (1.83 sq mi)
- Elevation: 229 m (751 ft)
- Highest elevation: 309 m (1,014 ft)
- Lowest elevation: 149 m (489 ft)
- Population (2023): 352
  - Density: 74.3/km^{2} (192/sq mi)
- Time zone: UTC+01:00 (CET)
  - Summer (DST): UTC+02:00 (CEST)
- INSEE/Postal code: 46211 /46150
- ^{1} French Land Register data, which excludes lakes, ponds, glaciers > 1 km^{2} (0.386 sq mi or 247 acres) and river estuaries.

Nuzéjouls is a commune in the Lot department in south-western France.

== Toponymy ==
Nuzejouls is derived from the Latin nux, nucis and the gaulish for "clearing".

== Tourism ==
During the 1990s, the village was a center of camel breeding, which attracted many tourists at a regional level.

== See also ==
- Communes of the Lot department
