= Lamothe-Cassel =

- Commune
- Location of Lamothe-Cassel
- Location within France Location within Occitanie
- Coordinates: 44°36′43″N 1°30′23″E
- Country: France
- Region: Occitania
- Department: Lot
- Arrondissement: Gourdon
- Canton: Causse et Bouriane
- Intercommunality: CC Quercy-Bouriane

Government
  - Mayor (2020–2026): Patrick Delpech
- Area^{1}: 11.35 km^{2} (4.38 sq mi)
- Elevation: 406 m (1,332 ft)
- Highest elevation: 444 m (1,457 ft)
- Lowest elevation: 269 m (883 ft)
- Population (2023): 116
  - Density: 10.2/km^{2} (26.5/sq mi)
- Time zone: UTC+01:00 (CET)
  - Summer (DST): UTC+02:00 (CEST)
- INSEE/Postal code: 46151 /46240
- ^{1} French Land Register data, which excludes lakes, ponds, glaciers > 1 km^{2} (0.386 sq mi or 247 acres) and river estuaries.

Lamothe-Cassel (French pronunciation: [lamɔt kasɛl]; Occitan: La Mota de Cassèl) is a commune in the Lot department in south-western France.

== See also ==
- Communes of the Lot department
