= Lamagdelaine =

- Commune
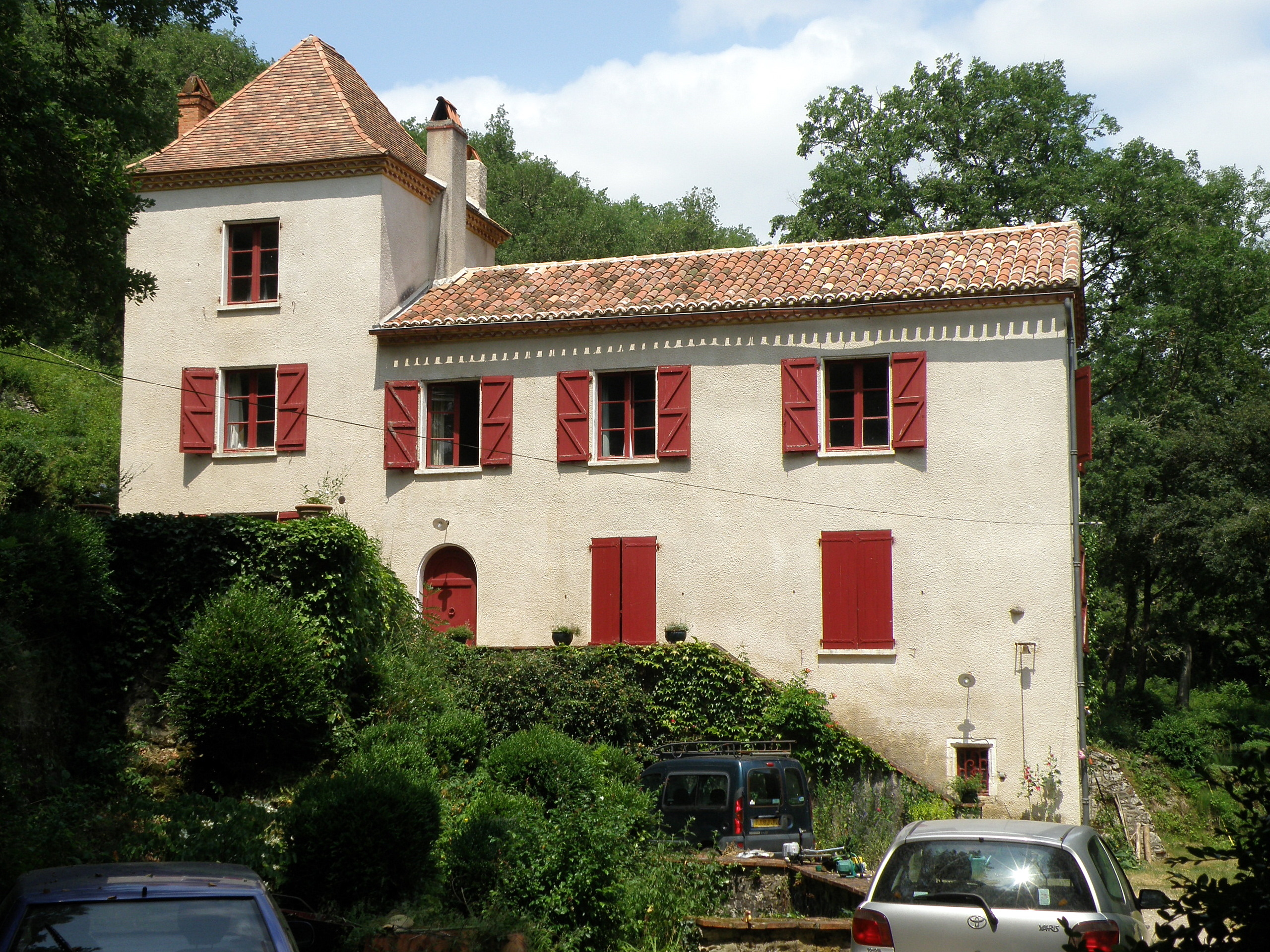
- The Nouaillac Mill in Lamagdelaine
- Location of Lamagdelaine
- Location within France Location within Occitanie
- Coordinates: 44°28′07″N 1°29′25″E
- Country: France
- Region: Occitania
- Department: Lot
- Arrondissement: Cahors
- Canton: Cahors-2
- Intercommunality: CA Grand Cahors

Government
  - Mayor (2020–2026): Véronique Arnaudet
- Area^{1}: 10.63 km^{2} (4.10 sq mi)
- Elevation: 122 m (400 ft)
- Highest elevation: 331 m (1,086 ft)
- Lowest elevation: 110 m (360 ft)
- Population (2023): 721
  - Density: 67.8/km^{2} (176/sq mi)
- Time zone: UTC+01:00 (CET)
  - Summer (DST): UTC+02:00 (CEST)
- INSEE/Postal code: 46149 /46090
- ^{1} French Land Register data, which excludes lakes, ponds, glaciers > 1 km^{2} (0.386 sq mi or 247 acres) and river estuaries.

Lamagdelaine (French pronunciation: [lamaɡdəlɛn]; Occitan: La Magdalena) is a commune located in the Lot department in south-western France.

== See also ==
- Communes of the Lot department
