= Uzech =

- Commune
- Location of Uzech
- Location within France Location within Occitanie
- Coordinates: 44°35′32″N 1°23′46″E
- Country: France
- Region: Occitania
- Department: Lot
- Arrondissement: Gourdon
- Canton: Causse et Bouriane
- Intercommunality: Quercy-Bouriane

Government
  - Mayor (2020–2026): Jean-Marc Lacroix
- Area^{1}: 12.21 km^{2} (4.71 sq mi)
- Elevation: 330 m (1,080 ft)
- Highest elevation: 373 m (1,224 ft)
- Lowest elevation: 213 m (699 ft)
- Population (2023): 196
  - Density: 16.1/km^{2} (41.6/sq mi)
- Time zone: UTC+01:00 (CET)
  - Summer (DST): UTC+02:00 (CEST)
- INSEE/Postal code: 46324 /46310
- ^{1} French Land Register data, which excludes lakes, ponds, glaciers > 1 km^{2} (0.386 sq mi or 247 acres) and river estuaries.

Uzech is a commune in the Lot department in south-western France.

== See also ==
- Communes of the Lot department
