= Maxou =

- Commune
- Location of Maxou
- Location within France Location within Occitanie
- Coordinates: 44°32′15″N 1°26′38″E
- Country: France
- Region: Occitania
- Department: Lot
- Arrondissement: Cahors
- Canton: Causse et Bouriane
- Intercommunality: CA Grand Cahors

Government
  - Mayor (2020–2026): Béatrice Calas
- Area^{1}: 12.59 km^{2} (4.86 sq mi)
- Elevation: 294 m (965 ft)
- Highest elevation: 382 m (1,253 ft)
- Lowest elevation: 168 m (551 ft)
- Population (2023): 287
  - Density: 22.8/km^{2} (59.0/sq mi)
- Time zone: UTC+01:00 (CET)
  - Summer (DST): UTC+02:00 (CEST)
- INSEE/Postal code: 46188 /46090
- ^{1} French Land Register data, which excludes lakes, ponds, glaciers > 1 km^{2} (0.386 sq mi or 247 acres) and river estuaries.

Maxou is a commune in the Lot department in south-western France.

== See also ==
- Communes of the Lot department
