= Montgesty =

- Commune
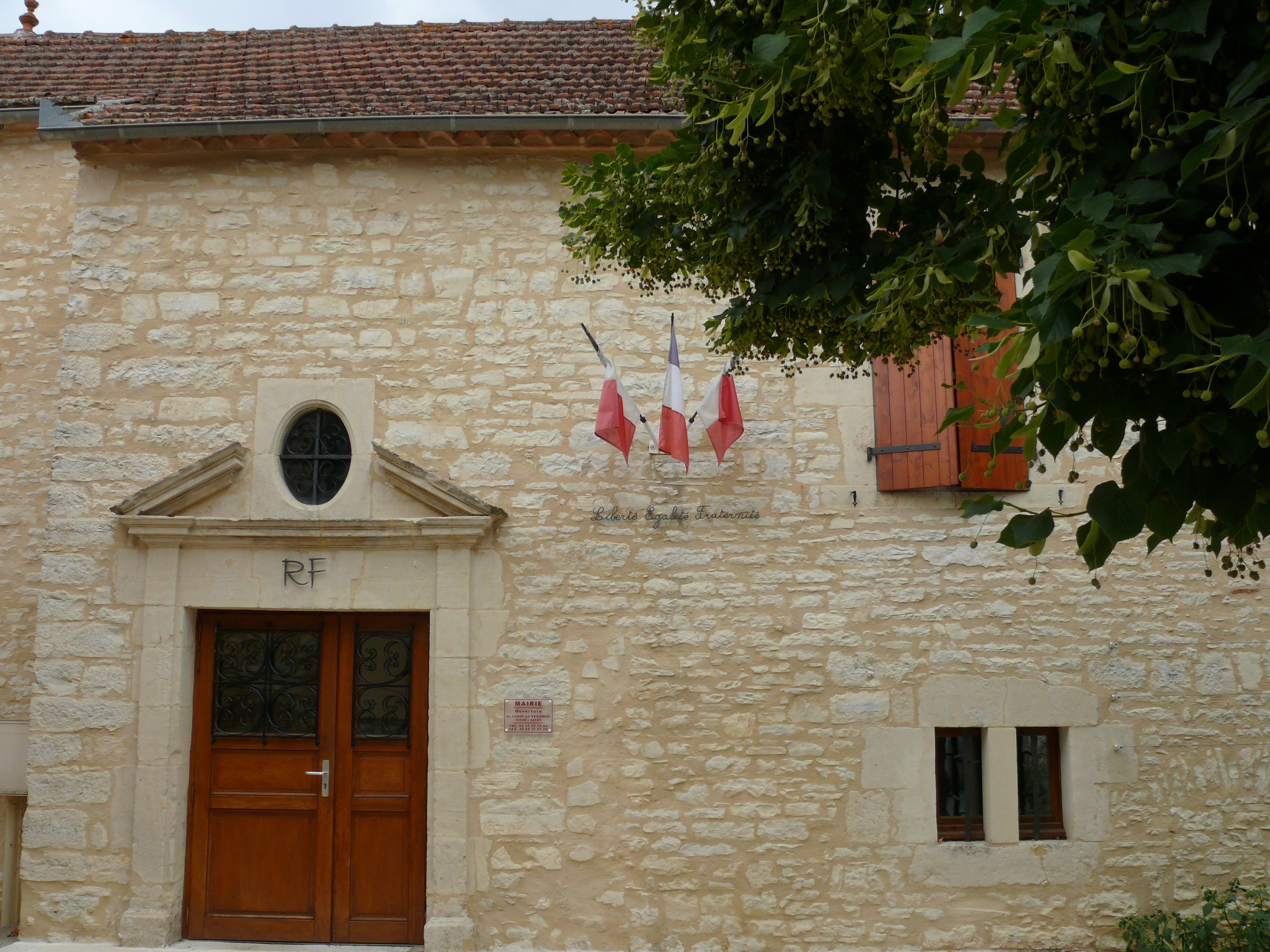
- The town hall in Montgesty
- Location of Montgesty
- Location within France Location within Occitanie
- Coordinates: 44°34′48″N 1°17′52″E
- Country: France
- Region: Occitania
- Department: Lot
- Arrondissement: Cahors
- Canton: Causse et Bouriane
- Intercommunality: CA Grand Cahors

Government
  - Mayor (2020–2026): Jean Noël Galthié
- Area^{1}: 11.88 km^{2} (4.59 sq mi)
- Elevation: 308 m (1,010 ft)
- Highest elevation: 313 m (1,027 ft)
- Lowest elevation: 170 m (560 ft)
- Population (2023): 319
  - Density: 26.9/km^{2} (69.5/sq mi)
- Time zone: UTC+01:00 (CET)
  - Summer (DST): UTC+02:00 (CEST)
- INSEE/Postal code: 46205 /46150
- ^{1} French Land Register data, which excludes lakes, ponds, glaciers > 1 km^{2} (0.386 sq mi or 247 acres) and river estuaries.

Montgesty is a commune in the Lot department in south-western France.

== See also ==
- Jean-Gabriel Perboyre
- Communes of the Lot department
