= Calamane =

- Commune
- Location of Calamane
- Location within France Location within Occitanie
- Coordinates: 44°31′37″N 1°23′30″E
- Country: France
- Region: Occitania
- Department: Lot
- Arrondissement: Cahors
- Canton: Causse et Bouriane
- Intercommunality: CA Grand Cahors

Government
  - Mayor (2020–2026): Jean-Paul Dujol
- Area^{1}: 7.6 km^{2} (2.9 sq mi)
- Elevation: 110 m (360 ft)
- Highest elevation: 324 m (1,063 ft)
- Lowest elevation: 139 m (456 ft)
- Population (2023): 471
  - Density: 62/km^{2} (160/sq mi)
- Time zone: UTC+01:00 (CET)
  - Summer (DST): UTC+02:00 (CEST)
- INSEE/Postal code: 46046 /46150
- ^{1} French Land Register data, which excludes lakes, ponds, glaciers > 1 km^{2} (0.386 sq mi or 247 acres) and river estuaries.

Calamane (French pronunciation: [kalaman]; Languedocien: Calamana) is a commune in the Lot department in south-western France.

== See also ==
- Communes of the Lot department
