= Château de Vaillac =

Castle in the Lot département of France

Coordinates: 44°40′25″N 1°31′56″E

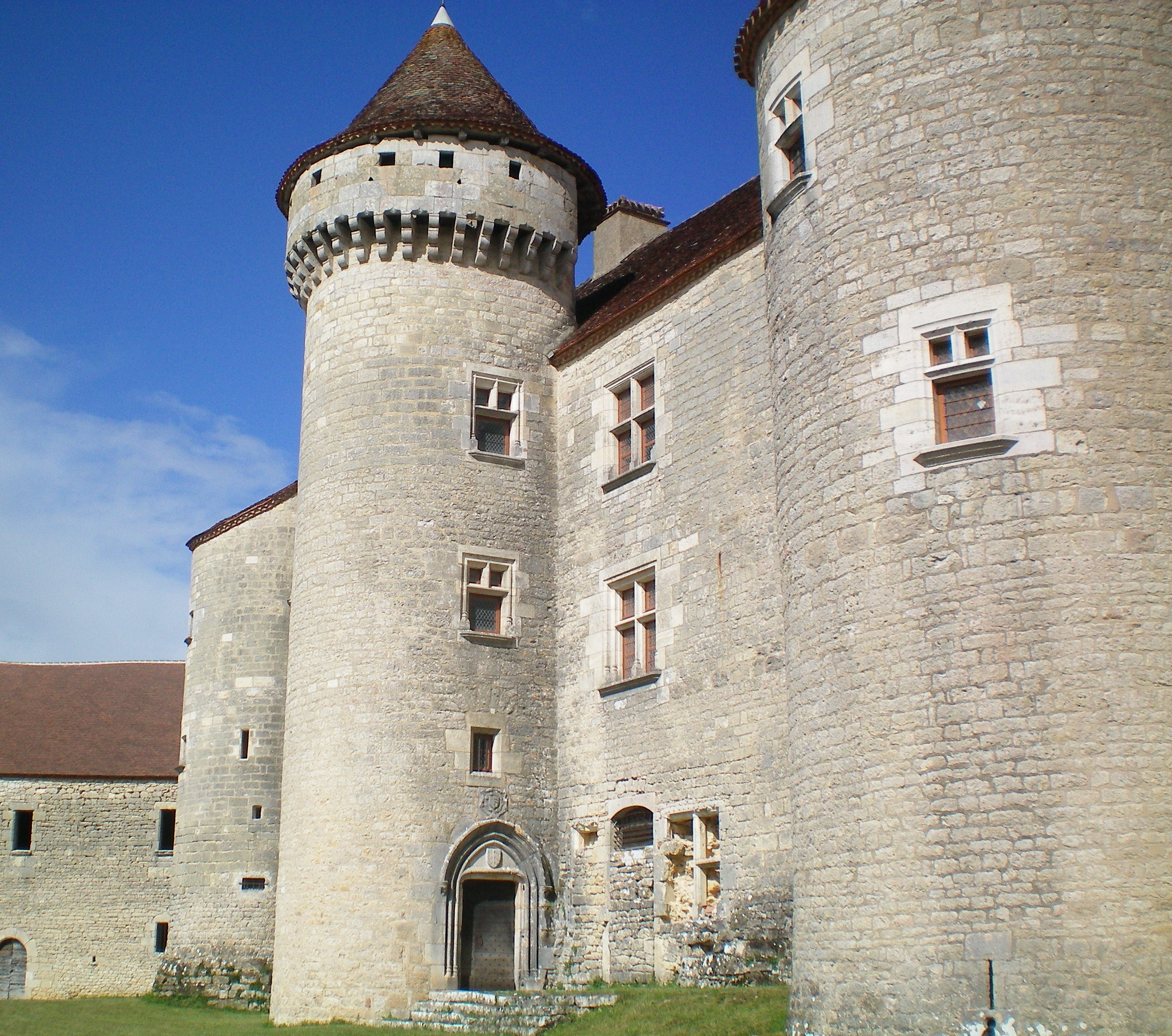
Château de Vaillac

The Château de Vaillac is a castle in the former commune of Vaillac, now part of Cœur-de-Causse, in the Lot département of France. The present building contains elements from the 14th, 15th, 16th and 17th centuries.

== History ==
The castle was built during the 13th century and was recorded during the Hundred Years' War. In 1597, Anne de Montberon, lady of Vaillac, rebuilt the castle from ruins. Decorations were ordered from Mathieu Jacquet de Grenoble, sculptor to the King. The castle has five circular towers, one of which, in the centre of the facade, contains the staircase. The corps de logis includes a square keep. There is a covered machicolated round walk on the walls. The eastern side has two half height corner towers. A square bastion overlooking the village contains a chapel. Along one side, vaulted stables could accommodate 500 horses. Internally, there are monumental chimneys and French ceilings with traces of decorative painting.

Galiote de Genouillac, daughter of Louis Ricard de Gourdon de Genouillac, was a notable 16th century woman associated with Vaillac. She took holy vows at seven years of age, became a prioress at 15 and reformed her order.

The Château de Vaillac is privately owned and not open to the public. It has been classified since 1958 as a monument historique by the French Ministry of Culture.

== Film ==
The film short Sauliac, directed by Edouard Giraudo and starring Jean-Claude Dreyfus, was filmed during May 2013 in several locations in the Lot département, including the Château de Vaillac.

== See also ==
- List of castles in France
