= Joachim Joseph André Murat =

French politician and diplomat

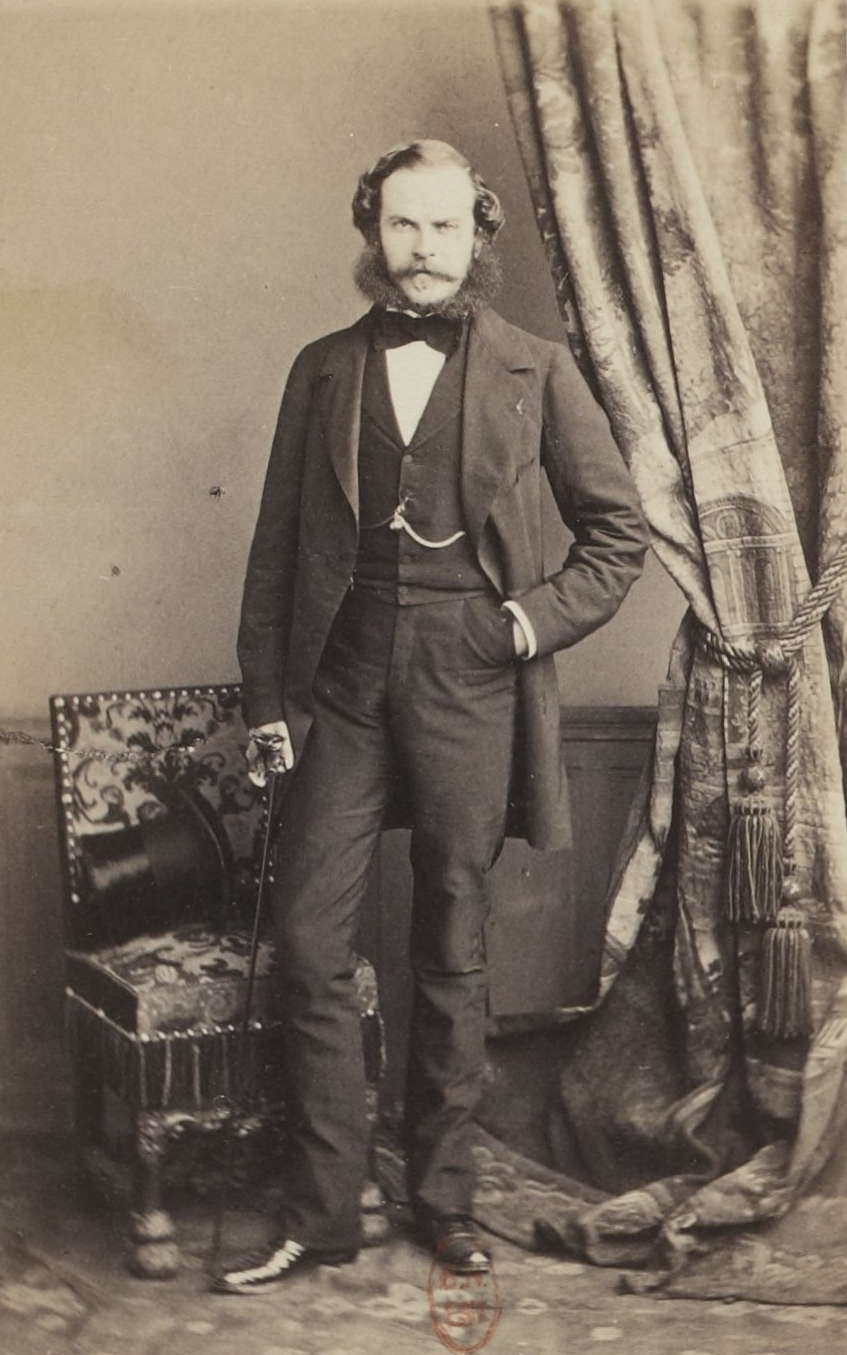
- Murat from the Album des députés au Corps législatif entre 1852–1857

Deputy for Lot
- In office 5 February 1854 – 4 September 1870

Representative for Lot
- In office 8 February 1871 – 7 March 1876

Deputy for Lot
- In office 20 February 1876 – 14 October 1889

Personal details
- Born: 12 December 1828 Paris
- Died: 13 March 1904 (aged 75) Labastide-Murat, Lot, France
- Occupation: Politician

Joachim Joseph André Murat (French: [ʒɔakim myʁa]; 12 December 1828 – 13 March 1904) was a French politician who served as deputy for Lot from 1854 to 1889 during the Second French Empire and the French Third Republic.

== Birth and family ==
Joachim Joseph André Murat, Count Murat, was born on 12 December 1828 in Paris. His parents were Pierre Gaétan Murat (1798–1847) and Marie Pauline de Méneval (1810–1889). He was the grand nephew of Napoleon's marshal and brother in law Joachim Murat, the King of Naples. On 17 November 1854 he married Blanche Alix Marion (c. 1835–1864). They had two children, Jeanne Pauline Caroline and Joachim. On 11 October 1866 he married Marguerite Barrot (1844–1937). He second wife was the daughter of the senator Adolphe Barrot. They had two children, Clothilde and Napoléone Louise Eugénie.

== Diplomat ==
After the February Revolution of 1848 Murat became a diplomat. He was attached to the mission of Alexandre Colonna-Walewski in Florence in 1849, and was acting French chargé d'affaires in that city from January to July 1852. In 1853 he was acting French chargé d'affaires in Stockholm, Sweden. In 1856 he accompanied Charles de Morny, Ambassador Extraordinary to Saint Petersburg, for the coronation of the Emperor Alexander II of Russia. The next year he published an account of the ceremonies he had attended.

== Second Empire politics ==
Murat was Secretary and Vice-President of the General Council of Lot. He was elected mayor of Cahors in 1853 and then mayor of Labastide-Murat. He was chosen as national deputy on 5 February 1854 in a by-election to replace Joseph Lafon de Cayx^{(fr)}, who had died, in the first constituency of Lot. Murat was reelected on 22 June 1857 by 33,990 votes against 443 votes for General Cavaignac, and was reelected by large majorities on 1 June 1863 and 24 May 1869. In the Corps législatif Murat sat with the dynastic majority. He sat on several committees, signed the interpellation of 116, and voted for the declaration that launched the Franco-Prussian War. In the 1869 legislature he sat with the Center-Right group, holding office until the defeat at the Battle of Sedan was followed by the declaration of the French Third Republic on 4 September 1870.

== Third Republic ==
Under the Third Republic Murat was elected representative for Lot in the National Assembly on 8 February 1871, holding office until 7 March 1876. He joined the Bonapartist Appel au peuple parliamentary group. He was one of the five deputies who protested at the Assembly of Bordeaux against the vote of degradation of Napoleon III. He obtained the restoration of the statue of Napoleon on the Vendôme Column. He voted for peace with Prussia, for repeal of the exile of the princes, for the resignation of Adolphe Thiers, against the government of Albert de Broglie and against the constitutional laws.

Murat was elected deputy for Lot on 20 February 1876, and reelected on 14 October 1877, 21 August 1881 and 4 October 1885, holding office until 14 October 1889. He opposed the policies of the republican ministries on education and the colonies. He voted against the prosecution of three members of the Ligue des Patriotes, against the draft Lisbonne law restricting freedom of the press, and against the prosecution of General Boulanger. He abstained on the indefinite postponement of revision of the constitution. For several years he was president of the Appel au peuple group. In 1878 he accompanied Napoléon, Prince Imperial, in his visit to the courts at Copenhagen and Stockholm. He was one of the prince's official representatives in Paris until the prince died in 1879 during the Anglo-Zulu War.

In 1889 Murat ran for reelection in the first constituency of Cahors, but was defeated by a republican, Léon Talou. He did not seek reelection, but continued to serve of the General Council of Lot until 1898. Murat was made an officer of the Legion of Honour on 14 August 1862. He received various foreign decorations including Commander of the Order of Saint Joseph of Tuscany, the Order of Saint Anna of Russia and Knight of the Order of the Polar Star of Sweden. Joachim Joseph André Murat died on 13 March 1904 in Labastide-Murat, Lot, at the age of 75.

== Publications ==
Publications included:

- Murat, Joachim (1857), Le Couronnement de l'empereur Alexandre II, souvenirs de l'ambassade de France, Paris: Amyot, p. 151
- Murat, Joachim (1883), Le Couronnement de l'empereur Alexandre II, souvenirs de l'ambassade de France, Paris: impr. de P. Mouillot, p. 192
- Murat, Joachim (1897), Murat, lieutenant de l'empereur en Espagne, 1808 (d'après sa correspondance inédite et des documents originaux), Paris: E. Plon, Nourrit et Cie, p. 478

== Sources ==
- Garric, Alain, "Joachim Joseph André MURAT", Geneanet (in French)
- Joachim, Joseph, André Murat (in French), Assemblée nationale
- Joachim Murat (comte, 1828–1904) (in French), BnF: Bibliotheque nationale de France
- Jolly, Jean (1960–1977), "MURAT, JOACHIM, JOSEPH, ANDRÉ", Dictionnaire des parlementaires français de 1889 à 1940 (in French), Paris: Éditeur : Presses universitaires de France, ISBN 2-1100-1998-0
- Robert, Adolphe; Cougny, Gaston (1889–1891), "MURAT (JOACHIM JOSEPH ANDRÉ)", in Edgar Bourloton (ed.), Dictionnaire des Parlementaires français (1789–1889) (in French)
