= Saint-Martial-de-Nabirat =

- Commune
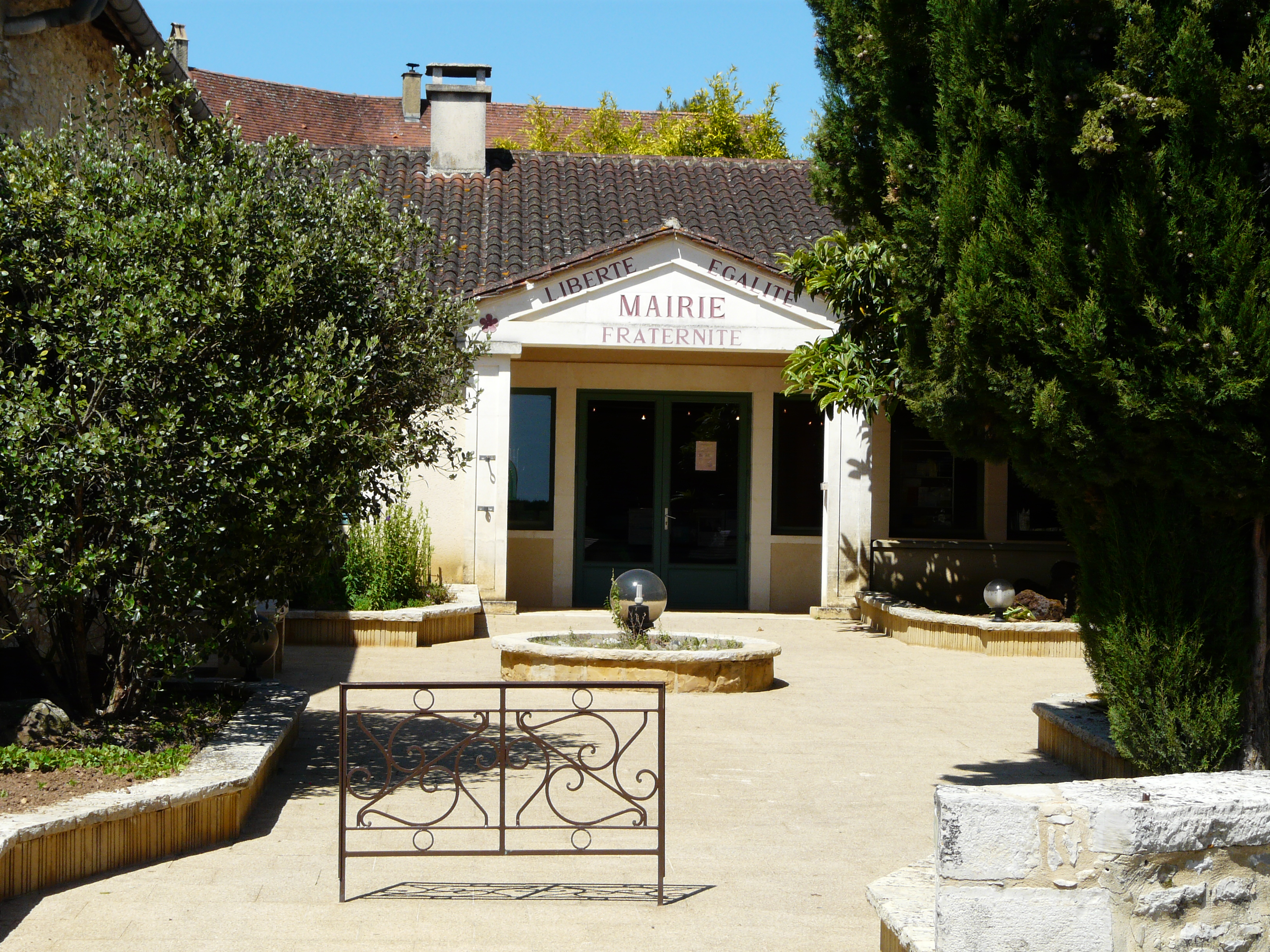
- The town hall in Saint-Martial-de-Nabirat
- Location of Saint-Martial-de-Nabirat
- Location within France Location within Nouvelle-Aquitaine
- Coordinates: 44°44′42″N 1°15′34″E
- Country: France
- Region: Nouvelle-Aquitaine
- Department: Dordogne
- Arrondissement: Sarlat-la-Canéda
- Canton: Vallée Dordogne

Government
  - Mayor (2020–2026): Hervé Ménardie
- Area^{1}: 15.57 km^{2} (6.01 sq mi)
- Elevation: 212 m (696 ft)
- Highest elevation: 238 m (781 ft)
- Lowest elevation: 105 m (344 ft)
- Population (2023): 586
  - Density: 37.6/km^{2} (97.5/sq mi)
- Time zone: UTC+01:00 (CET)
  - Summer (DST): UTC+02:00 (CEST)
- INSEE/Postal code: 24450 /24250
- ^{1} French Land Register data, which excludes lakes, ponds, glaciers > 1 km^{2} (0.386 sq mi or 247 acres) and river estuaries.

Saint-Martial-de-Nabirat (French pronunciation: [sɛ̃ maʁsjal də nabiʁa]; Occitan: Sent Marçal de Nabirac) is a commune in the Dordogne department in Nouvelle-Aquitaine in southwestern France.

== Geography ==
The river Céou forms all of the commune's southern border.

== Population ==
Historical population
Year	Pop.	±% p.a.
1968	473	—
1975	463	−0.30%
1982	415	−1.55%
1990	512	+2.66%
1999	513	+0.02%
2007	629	+2.58%
2012	634	+0.16%
2017	584	−1.63%
2023	586	+0.06%
Source: INSEE

== See also ==
- Communes of the Dordogne department
