= Cénac-et-Saint-Julien =

- Commune
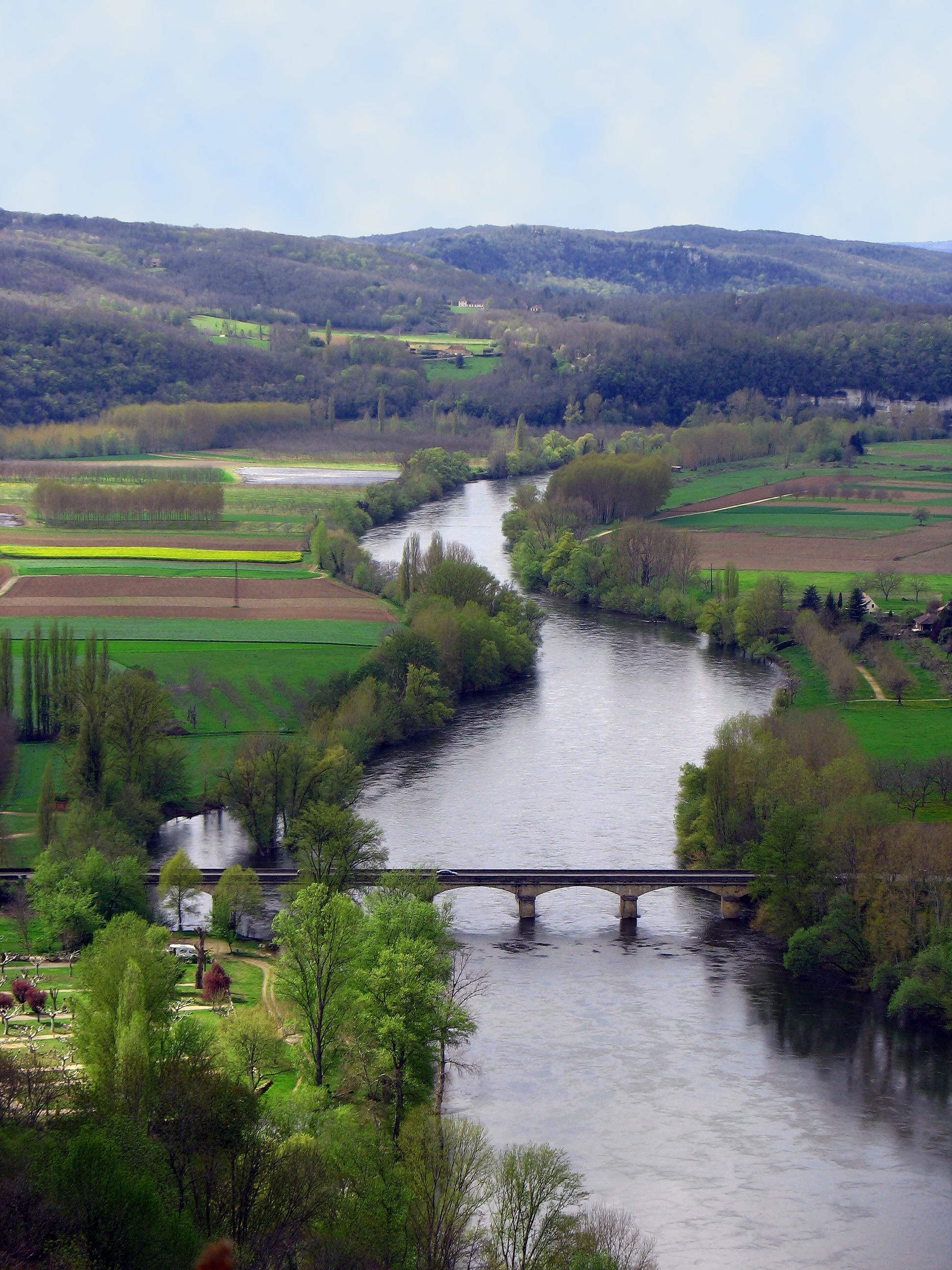
- The Dordogne

- Coat of arms
- Location of Cénac-et-Saint-Julien
- Location within France Location within Nouvelle-Aquitaine
- Coordinates: 44°48′03″N 1°12′18″E
- Country: France
- Region: Nouvelle-Aquitaine
- Department: Dordogne
- Arrondissement: Sarlat-la-Canéda
- Canton: Vallée Dordogne

Government
  - Mayor (2020–2026): Joëlle Debet Duverneix
- Area^{1}: 19.87 km^{2} (7.67 sq mi)
- Elevation: 70 m (230 ft)
- Highest elevation: 252 m (827 ft)
- Lowest elevation: 60 m (200 ft)
- Population (2023): 1,183
  - Density: 59.54/km^{2} (154.2/sq mi)
- Time zone: UTC+01:00 (CET)
  - Summer (DST): UTC+02:00 (CEST)
- INSEE/Postal code: 24091 /24250
- ^{1} French Land Register data, which excludes lakes, ponds, glaciers > 1 km^{2} (0.386 sq mi or 247 acres) and river estuaries.

Cénac-et-Saint-Julien (French pronunciation: [senak e sɛ̃ ʒyljɛ̃]; Occitan: Senac e Sent Julian) is a commune in the Dordogne department in Nouvelle-Aquitaine in southwestern France.

== Geography ==
The river Céou, a tributary of the Dordogne, forms part of the commune's south-western border; the Dordogne forms most of its northern border.

The Commune has one main high street, which is in a N–S axis. It is the main road to Sarlat across one of the many bridges that cross the Dordogne to the north.

== Population ==
Historical population
Year	Pop.	±% p.a.
1968	811	—
1975	825	+0.24%
1982	900	+1.25%
1990	993	+1.24%
1999	1,068	+0.81%
2007	1,207	+1.54%
2012	1,191	−0.27%
2017	1,206	+0.25%
2023	1,183	−0.32%
Source: INSEE

== Amenities ==
In summer time you can hire canoes for use on the river on the western southern bank near the bridge.

There is one main shopping centre with a petrol station opposite. There is a pharmacy, grocer's, a pizza house, baker's, and two taverns, one with a restaurant. There is also a primary school.

== Sport ==
On Saturdays Rugby seems to be the main occupation on the fields to the south. The enthusiasm and cheering echoes through the valley.

== Events ==
A farmers' market is held regularly in the central market area which also does clothes and handicrafts.

== Sights ==
Cénac has a romanesque church, Ste. Marie, to the west, on the road that leads to Saint-Julien. It is nearly always open for visitors.

To the east roads go up and down from the famous bastide town of Domme. Drivers should be aware that the southernmost road is one-way-only down (except for access).

Cénac retains its old communal washhouse in almost perfect condition.

== See also ==
- Communes of the Dordogne department
