= Daglan =

- Commune
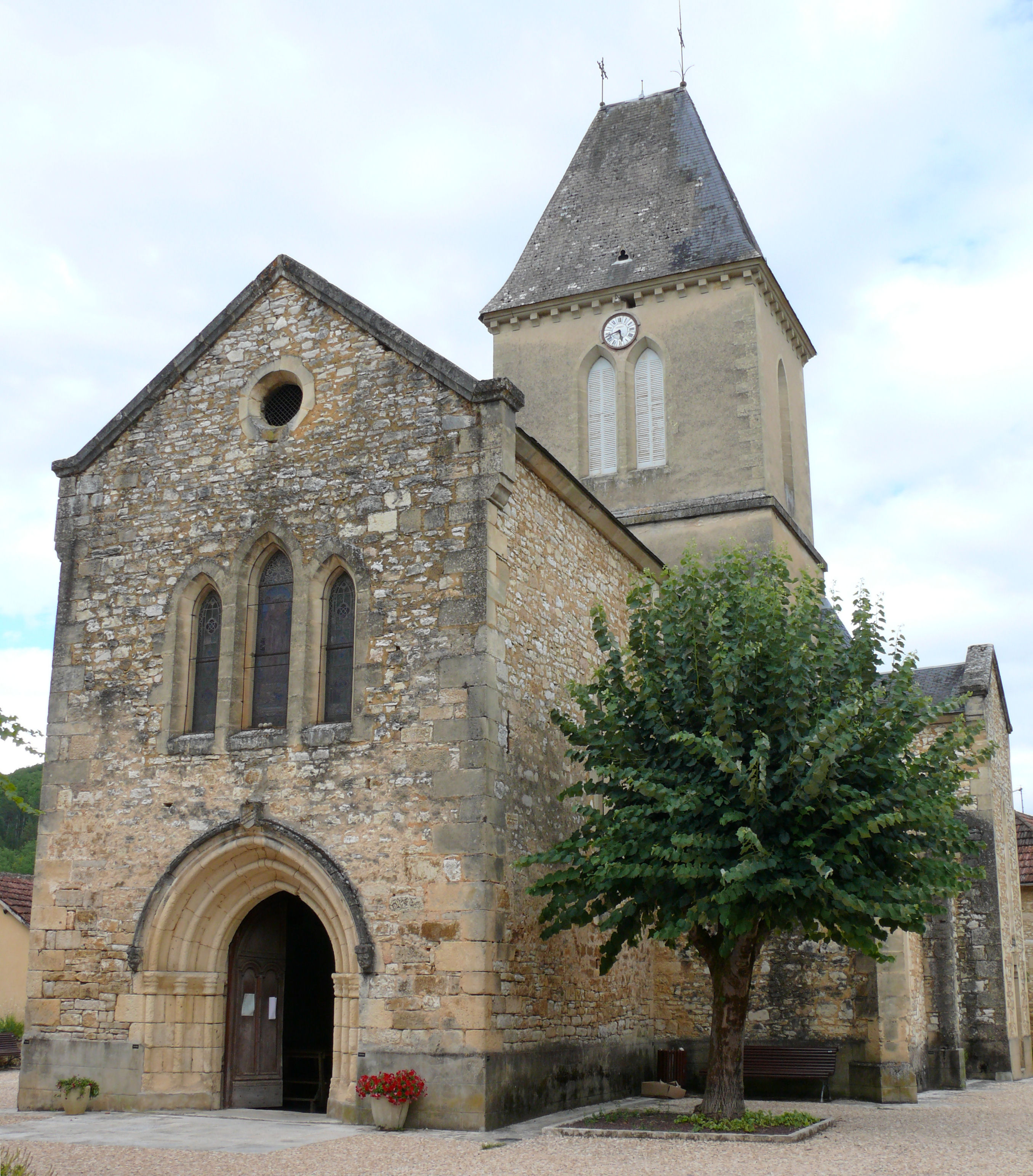
- The church in Daglan

- Coat of arms
- Location of Daglan
- Location within France Location within Nouvelle-Aquitaine
- Coordinates: 44°44′33″N 1°11′37″E
- Country: France
- Region: Nouvelle-Aquitaine
- Department: Dordogne
- Arrondissement: Sarlat-la-Canéda
- Canton: Vallée Dordogne
- Intercommunality: Domme-Villefranche du Périgord

Government
  - Mayor (2020–2026): Pascal Dussol
- Area^{1}: 19.96 km^{2} (7.71 sq mi)
- Elevation: 100 m (330 ft)
- Highest elevation: 282 m (925 ft)
- Lowest elevation: 83 m (272 ft)
- Population (2023): 570
  - Density: 29/km^{2} (74/sq mi)
- Time zone: UTC+01:00 (CET)
  - Summer (DST): UTC+02:00 (CEST)
- INSEE/Postal code: 24150 /24250
- ^{1} French Land Register data, which excludes lakes, ponds, glaciers > 1 km^{2} (0.386 sq mi or 247 acres) and river estuaries.

Daglan (French pronunciation: [daɡlɑ̃]) is a commune in the Dordogne department in Nouvelle-Aquitaine in southwestern France.

== Geography ==
The village lies on the left bank of the Céou, which flows northwest through the commune.

== Population ==
Historical population
Year	Pop.	±% p.a.
1968	611	—
1975	627	+0.37%
1982	608	−0.44%
1990	477	−2.99%
1999	535	+1.28%
2007	541	+0.14%
2012	558	+0.62%
2017	538	−0.73%
2023	570	+0.97%
Source: INSEE

== See also ==
- Communes of the Dordogne department
