= Saint-Sauveur-la-Vallée =

- Part of Cœur de Causse
- Location of Saint-Sauveur-la-Vallée
- Location within France Location within Occitanie
- Coordinates: 44°36′25″N 1°33′13″E
- Country: France
- Region: Occitania
- Department: Lot
- Arrondissement: Gourdon
- Canton: Causse et Vallées
- Commune: Cœur de Causse
- Area^{1}: 6.70 km^{2} (2.59 sq mi)
- Elevation: 249 m (817 ft)
- Highest elevation: 435 m (1,427 ft)
- Lowest elevation: 236 m (774 ft)
- Population (2022): 50
  - Density: 7.5/km^{2} (19/sq mi)
- Time zone: UTC+01:00 (CET)
  - Summer (DST): UTC+02:00 (CEST)
- Postal code: 46240
- ^{1} French Land Register data, which excludes lakes, ponds, glaciers > 1 km^{2} (0.386 sq mi or 247 acres) and river estuaries.

Saint-Sauveur-la-Vallée (French pronunciation: [sɛ̃ sovœʁ la vale]; Languedocien: Sent Salvador) is a former commune in the Lot department in south-western France. On 1 January 2016, it was merged into the new commune of Cœur de Causse. Its population was 50 in 2022.

== See also ==
- Communes of the Lot department
