= Ferdinand Barrot =

French politician (1806–1883)

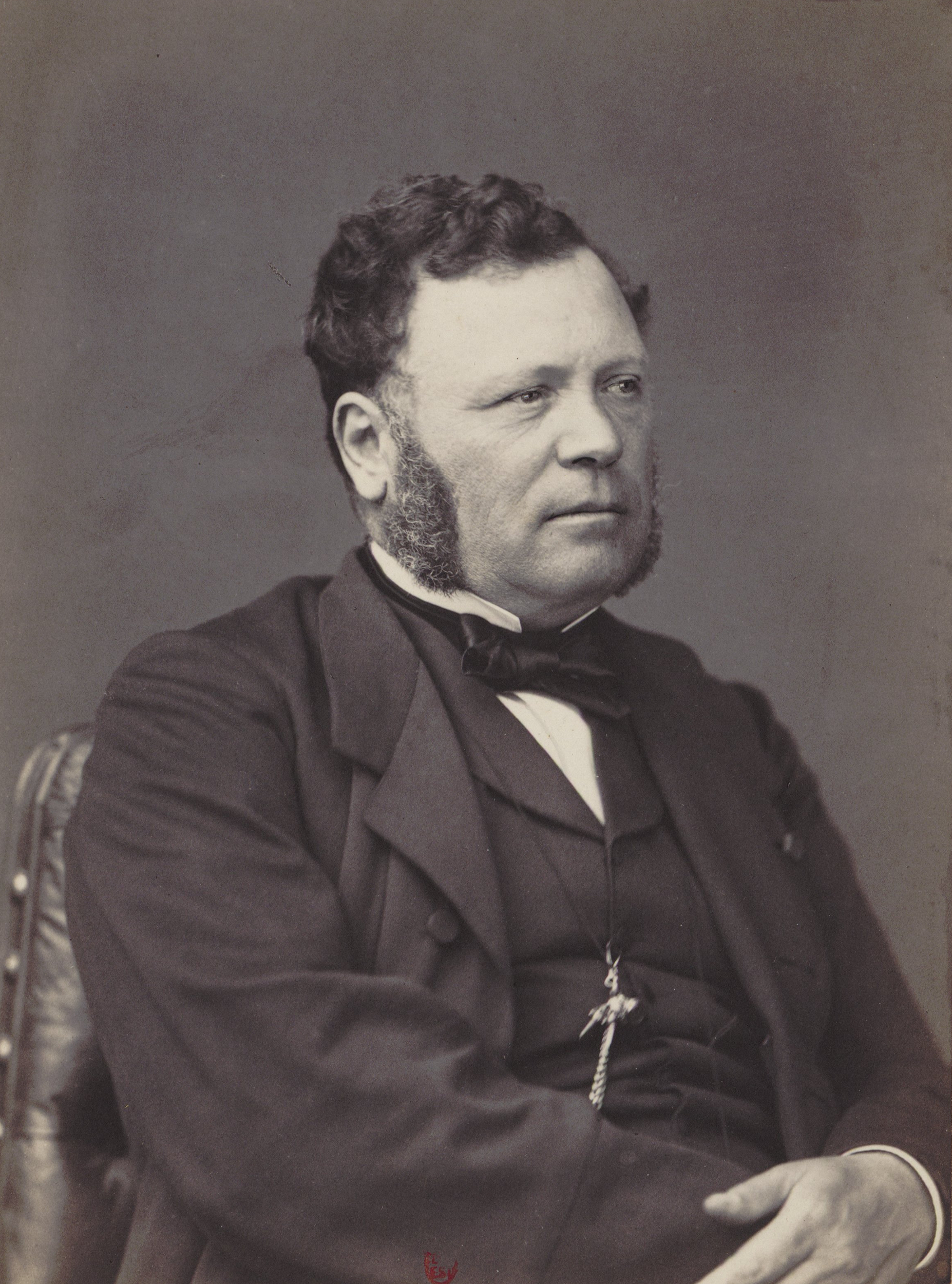
Ferdinand Barrot

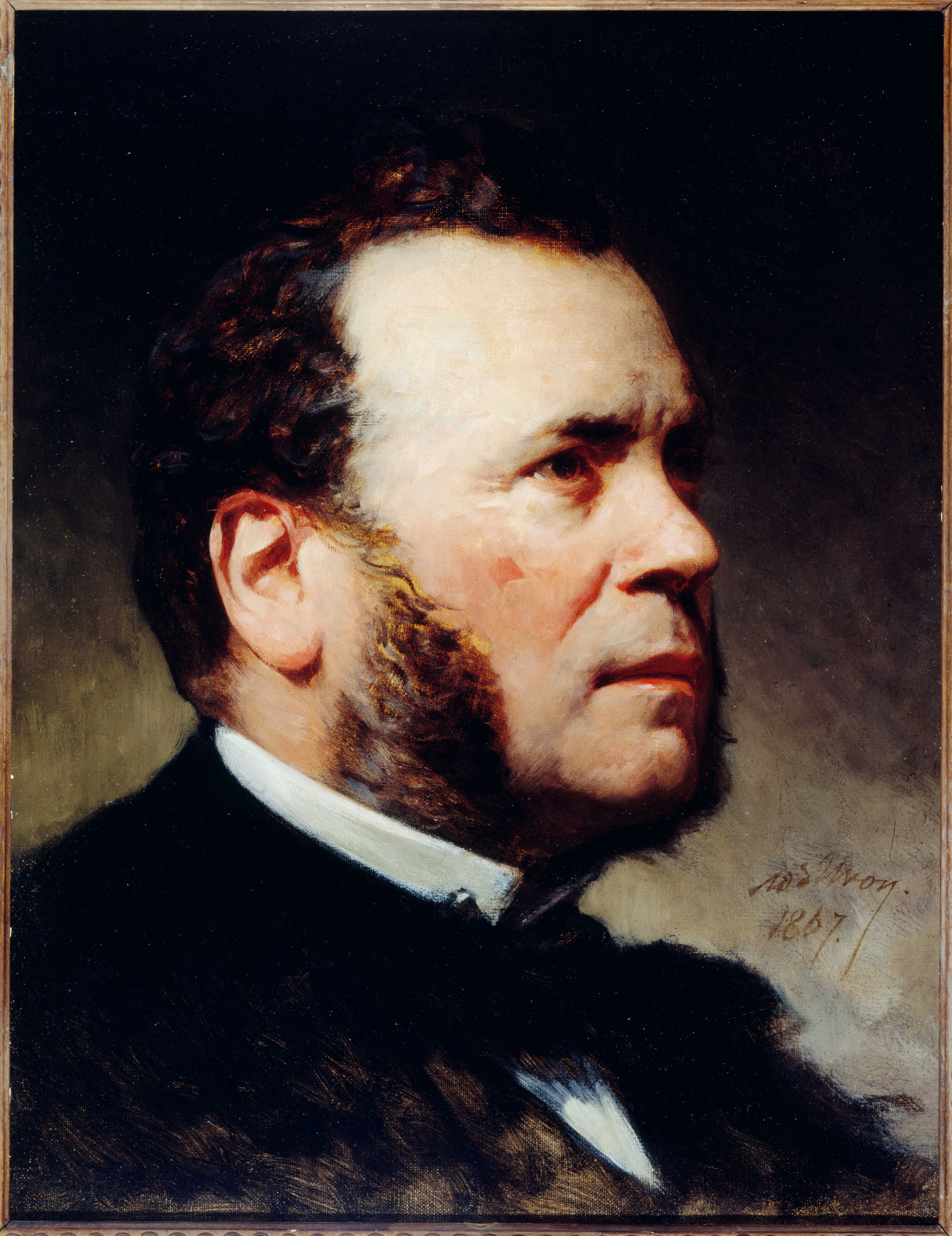
Ferdinand Barrot in 1867. Portrait by Adolphe Yvon

Ferdinand Victorin Barrot (English: /bɑːˈroʊ/ ba-ROH, French: [fɛʁdinɑ̃ viktɔʁɛ̃ baʁo]; 10 January 1806 – 12 November 1883) was a French Bonapartist politician. He was a deputy in the National Assembly for Indre-et-Loire, Algeria, and the Seine and later a Senator. Barrot was the Interior Minister of France from 1849 to 1850. In 1852, he was made a commander of the Légion d'honneur.

== Biography ==
Ferdinand Victorin Barrot was born in 1905 in Paris, the son of Jean-André Barrot. His brothers were Odilon Barrot and Adolphe Barrot. Barrot pursued law studies and became an avocat under the Restoration. Following the Revolution of 1830, he served for a time as an assistant procurator at the civil tribunal of the département of the Seine, but quit the magistrature after some time to return to the bar, where he pleaded several politically charged cases, notably that of Colonel Vaudrey implicated in the attempted insurrection at Strasbourg fomented by prince Louis-Napoléon Bonaparte, in which he obtained acquittal, 18 January 1837. He also pleaded in the case of the republican activist Armand Barbès (1839).

He was elected a deputy by the third electoral college of Indre-et-Loire, 9 July 1842, and allied himself at first with the centre-left. He was appointed avocat for the Ministry of the Treasury. With his re-election 1 August 1846, he found himself preoccupied with Algerian affairs. Accordingly when deputios were granted Algeria, he was elected to represent the new département of Algeria, 18 June 1848. Having failed to be returned 23 May 1849, he was elected for the département of the Seine in a by-election to fill vacated seats, 8 July 1849.

He voted generally in the revolutionary year of 1848 with the right: against clubs and associations (18 June 1848), but with the Left against re-establishing press controls (9 August); with the prosecution against Louis Blanc and Caussidière (26 August); against the Pyat amendment concerning right to work (2 November); for the French expedition to Rome (30 November); against the suppression of the salt tax (27 December).

In 1849 he voted for the return to the High Court of those accused 15 May 1848 (22 January 1849); again for the interdiction of clubs (21 March); against the accusation of the Président Napoleon and his ministers (11 May).

Allied with prince Louis-Napoléon Bonaparte, whom he had assisted before the Camber of Peers after the Boulogne affair (1840), he associated himself with Napoleon's party and was named secrétaire de la Présidence (1849), Minister of the Interior (31 October 1849), and ambassador to Turin upon leaving the ministry in March 1850. He was a member of the consultative commission following the coup d'état of 2 December 1851. He was made a commander of the Légion d'honneur on 8 December 1852. He was made a senator under the Second Empire (4 March 1853).

With the collapse of the Second Empire, Barrot returned to private life. He ran unsuccessfully for a seat under the Third Republic, 16 May 1877 but was defeated, in spite of the support of MacMahon. He was seated in the Senate, as a bonapartist, 4 December 1877.

He died in Paris, 12 November 1883.
