= Beaumat =

- Part of Cœur-de-Causse
- Location of Beaumat
- Location within France Location within Occitanie
- Coordinates: 44°39′37″N 1°31′15″E
- Country: France
- Region: Occitania
- Department: Lot
- Arrondissement: Gourdon
- Canton: Causse et Bouriane
- Commune: Cœur-de-Causse
- Area^{1}: 8.10 km^{2} (3.13 sq mi)
- Elevation: 320 m (1,050 ft)
- Highest elevation: 426 m (1,398 ft)
- Lowest elevation: 238 m (781 ft)
- Population (2023): 72
  - Density: 8.9/km^{2} (23/sq mi)
- Time zone: UTC+01:00 (CET)
  - Summer (DST): UTC+02:00 (CEST)
- Postal code: 46240
- ^{1} French Land Register data, which excludes lakes, ponds, glaciers > 1 km^{2} (0.386 sq mi or 247 acres) and river estuaries.

Beaumat (French pronunciation: [boma]; Occitan: Baumat) is a former commune in the Lot department in southwestern France. On 1 January 2016, it was merged into the new commune of Cœur-de-Causse.

== Geography ==
The river Céou forms part of the commune's northern border.

== See also ==
- Communes of the Lot department
