= Adolphe Barrot =

French diplomat and politician (1801–1870)

Théodore-Adolphe Barrot

Senator of France
- In office 5 October 1864 – 15 June 1870

Personal details
- Born: 14 October 1801 Paris, France
- Died: 15 June 1870 (aged 68) Paris, France
- Occupation: Diplomat

Théodore-Adolphe Barrot (English: /bɑːˈroʊ/ ba-ROH, French: [teɔdɔʁ adɔlf baʁo]; 14 October 1801 – 15 June 1870) was a French diplomat during the July Monarchy, the French Second Republic and the Second French Empire. He served in Colombia, the Philippines, Haiti, Brazil, Portugal, Naples, Belgium and Spain. He became a senator just before his retirement.

== Family ==
Théodore-Adolphe Barrot was born in Paris on 14 October 1801. His parents were Jean André Barrot (1753–1845), an advocate and deputy to the National Convention, and Théresa Virginie Borelli de Serre (1766–1858). He was the brother of Odilon Barrot and Ferdinand Barrot. On 29 September 1839 he married Georgina Manvers Manby (1815–1900), daughter of the British rear-admiral Thomas Manby. Their children were Jean André Georges Odilon Barrot (1841–1904), Marguerite Marie Georgina Barrot (1844–1937) and Charlotte Amélie Barrot (1848–1941). Marguerite Marie Georgina became the second wife of the diplomat and deputy Joachim Joseph André Murat.

== Career ==
Barrot became a diplomat. He was appointed French Consul at Cartagena, Colombia, where he observed the slender-snouted or American crocodile (Crocodylus acutus). He served in Colombia from 1831 to 1835. On 3 August 1833 Barrot was arrested and his official papers seized. Barrot was first French consul in Manila from 1835 to 1838. He visited Hawaii in La Bonite in 1836. That year he published Unless Haste is Made: A French Sceptic's Account of the Sandwich Islands. He wrote that in the Sandwich Islands (today's state of Hawaii), "we found the villages more European, and the people almost as vicious as those who have civilized them. He said that "unless haste is made" the unique way of life of the Hawaiians would be lost. Barrot was enthusiastic about the musicians of Hawaii, but found the dancing monotonous. His report and that of Captain Vaillant made the government more aware of the situation in Honolulu and the opposition by the king of Hawaii to missionary activity.

In 1838 Barrot returned on leave from Manila, and in 1839 convinced the government and several leading trading houses of the great commercial potential of Southeast Asia. He was sent back to Manila as Consul General for "Indochine", meaning all of Southeast Asia. On 21 December 1839 he sailed from Marseille on the Tancrèd with his bride. Her letters describing the journey to her uncle, Captain George William Manby, were published at Yarmouth in 1842. Traveling via Pisa, Alexandria and Aden they reached Bombay (Mumbai) on 12 March 1840. They left Singapore on 26 May 1840 on the Progrés, a Belgian ship, and reached Manila 45 days later after a slow passage due to contrary winds. Barrot set up residence in Manila as French consul general. His son Georges Jean André Odilon was born in Manila in 1841. His assistant Eugène Chaigneau was based in Singapore, and Barrot established agents in Batavia and Macau. He collected much information about the trade in the region and strongly recommended that France establish a base there to compete with Singapore and Batavia.

In January 1843 Barrot and his wife, and his brother Odilon, accompanied Benjamin Disraeli to the Grand Opera in Paris. Barrot was sent on a special mission to Haiti later in 1843. The former French colony had agreed as part of the 1825 treaty of recognition with France to pay 150 million francs as indemnity to the colonial proprietors, later reduced to 60 million francs, which the republic had not paid. Barrot's mandate was to negotiate payment at least to the surviving colonists and their impoverished heirs. As French commissioner at Port-au-Prince in Haiti he informed Buenaventura Báez that France would provide support if he arranged for the eastern end of Hispaniola to separate from Haiti and raise the French flag. The separation happened, but as the independent Dominican Republic.

In 1845 Barrot was Consul General in Cairo and wrote to François Guizot, the Minister of Foreign Affairs, about the gum trade of Kordofan in the Sudan. Barrot called the Egyptian Pasha Mehemet Ali a "great man", as did Guizot. In May 1846 Jules Itier and the members of a commercial delegation stayed with Barrot while returning from a visit to China after the end of the First Opium War. The consuls of England, Russia and Sardinia were invited to dine with the visitors. Barrot was French minister plenipotentiary to Brazil and then to Lisbon in 1849, to Naples in 1951 and to Brussels in 1853. He was French ambassador to Madrid from August 1858 to October 1864. He was made a senator on 5 October 1864. He retired from the diplomatic service as an ambassador on 17 February 1865. He voted in the Senate with the dynastic majority.

Adolphe Barrot died in Paris on 15 June 1870. Although he was not of noble blood, Barrot had been made a Knight of the Order of Saint Januarius of the Kingdom of Naples. The Purple-crowned fairy hummingbird, Heliothryx barroti, preserves his name.

== Sources ==
- Barrot, Georgiana M. (1842), Account of a Voyage to Manilla, in a Series of Letters from the Lady of the Consul-General of France to All India, M. Adolphe Barrot, to Her Uncle, Captain George W. Manby, Charles Sloman
- Beolens, Bo; Watkins, Michael; Grayson, Michael (2014-08-28), The Eponym Dictionary of Birds, Bloomsbury Publishing, ISBN 978-1-4729-0574-1
- Caquet, P. E. (2016-09-29), The Orient, the Liberal Movement, and the Eastern Crisis of 1839-41, Springer International Publishing, ISBN 978-3-319-34102-6
- Dumeril, A.M.C.; Bibron, G. (1844), "Natural History of Reptiles", The Edinburgh Review, Reprinted for Eastburn, Kirk & Company
- Durand, Guy; Klein, Jean-François (January–March 2010), "Une impossible liaison? Marseille et le commerce à la Chine, 1815-1860", Revue d'histoire moderne et contemporaine (in French), 57 (1), Societe d'Histoire Moderne et Contemporaine: 139–167, doi:10.3917/rhmc.571.0139, JSTOR 27862105
- Green, Benjamin C. (28 January 1850), "Mr. Green to Mr. Clayton", Congressional Serial Set, U.S. Government Printing Office
- Kuykendall, Ralph Simpson (1938), The Hawaiian Kingdom, University of Hawaii Press, ISBN 978-0-87022-431-7
- "American Chronological Table", Longworth's American Almanac, New York Register, and City Directory ..., T. Longworth & Son., 1841
- Love, J.W.; Kaeppler, Adrienne (2017-09-25), The Garland Encyclopedia of World Music: Australia and the Pacific Islands, Taylor & Francis, ISBN 978-1-351-54432-0
- McCall, Grant (October 1979), "Reviewed Works: Unless Haste Is Made...", Archaeology & Physical Anthropology in Oceania, 14 (3), Wiley on behalf of Oceania Publications, University of Sydney, JSTOR 40386360
- Monypenny, William Flavelle (2008), The Life of Benjamin Disraeli, Earl of Beaconsfield Volume II 1837-1846, Wildside Press LLC, ISBN 978-1-4344-7290-8
- "Hayti", Niles' National Register, William Ogden Niles, 28 October 1843
- Pierfit, "Théodore Adolphe BARROT", Geneanet (in French)
- Reid, Anthony (2005), An Indonesian Frontier: Acehnese and Other Histories of Sumatra, NUS Press, ISBN 978-9971-69-298-8
- Robert, Adolphe; Cougny, Gaston (1889–1891), "BARROT (THÉODORE-ADOLPHE)", in Edgar Bourloton (ed.), Dictionnaire des Parlementaires français (1789–1889) (in French)
- Robert, Adolphe; Cougny, Gaston (1889–1891b), "MURAT (JOACHIM JOSEPH ANDRÉ)", in Edgar Bourloton (ed.), Dictionnaire des Parlementaires français (1789–1889) (in French)
- Roux, Sophie de, "Thomas MANBY", Geneanet
- Stiansen, Endre; Kevane, Michael (1998), Kordafan Invaded: Peripherial (sic) Incorporation and Social Transformation in Islamic Africa, BRILL, ISBN 90-04-11049-6
