= Séniergues =

- Commune
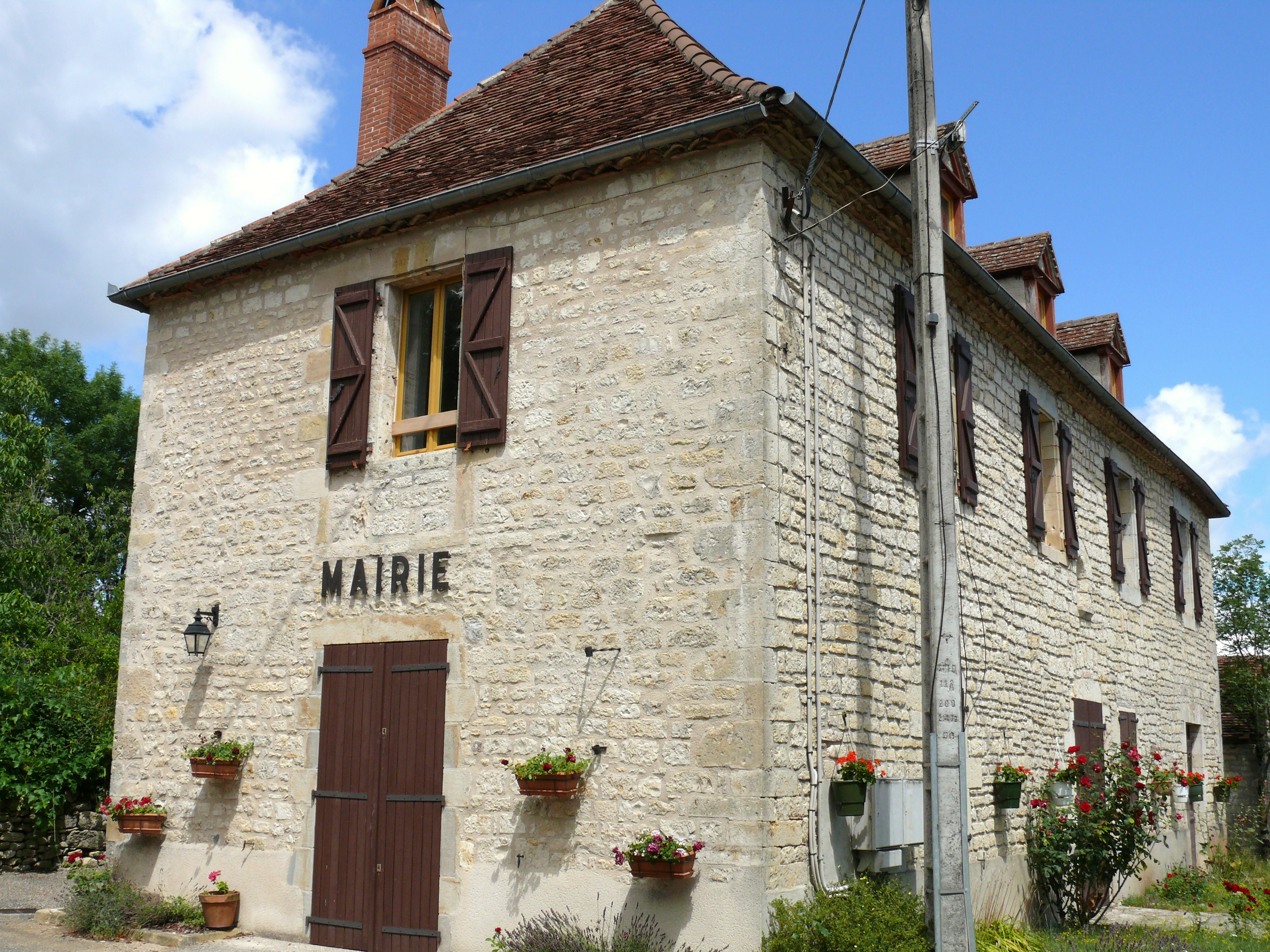
- Town hall

- Coat of arms
- Location of Séniergues
- Location within France Location within Occitanie
- Coordinates: 44°42′04″N 1°32′51″E
- Country: France
- Region: Occitania
- Department: Lot
- Arrondissement: Gourdon
- Canton: Causse et Bouriane
- Intercommunality: CC Causse de Labastide-Murat

Government
  - Mayor (2020–2026): Michel Thebaud
- Area^{1}: 18.17 km^{2} (7.02 sq mi)
- Elevation: 320 m (1,050 ft)
- Highest elevation: 425 m (1,394 ft)
- Lowest elevation: 223 m (732 ft)
- Population (2023): 146
  - Density: 8.04/km^{2} (20.8/sq mi)
- Time zone: UTC+01:00 (CET)
  - Summer (DST): UTC+02:00 (CEST)
- INSEE/Postal code: 46304 /46240
- ^{1} French Land Register data, which excludes lakes, ponds, glaciers > 1 km^{2} (0.386 sq mi or 247 acres) and river estuaries.

Séniergues (French pronunciation: [senjɛʁɡ]; Occitan: Senièrgas) is a commune in the Lot department in south-western France.

== Geography ==
The river Céou has its source in the commune and forms part of its southern border.

== See also ==
- Communes of the Lot department
