= Frayssinet =

- Commune
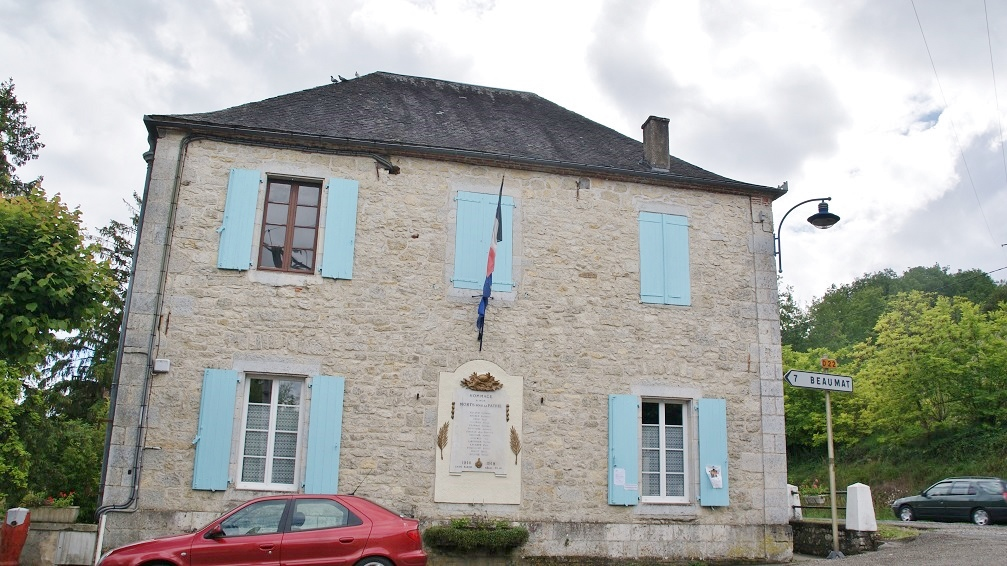
- Town hall
- Location of Frayssinet
- Location within France Location within Occitanie
- Coordinates: 44°39′47″N 1°29′00″E
- Country: France
- Region: Occitania
- Department: Lot
- Arrondissement: Gourdon
- Canton: Causse et Bouriane
- Intercommunality: CC Causse de Labastide-Murat

Government
  - Mayor (2020–2026): Claude Saint-Martin
- Area^{1}: 16.83 km^{2} (6.50 sq mi)
- Elevation: 347 m (1,138 ft)
- Highest elevation: 413 m (1,355 ft)
- Lowest elevation: 221 m (725 ft)
- Population (2023): 309
  - Density: 18.4/km^{2} (47.6/sq mi)
- Time zone: UTC+01:00 (CET)
  - Summer (DST): UTC+02:00 (CEST)
- INSEE/Postal code: 46113 /46310
- ^{1} French Land Register data, which excludes lakes, ponds, glaciers > 1 km^{2} (0.386 sq mi or 247 acres) and river estuaries.

Frayssinet (French pronunciation: [fʁɛsinɛ]; Occitan: Fraissinet) is a commune in the Lot department in south-western France.

== Geography ==
The river Céou flows westward through the northern part of the commune.

== See also ==
- Communes of the Lot department
