= Saint-Cybranet =

- Commune
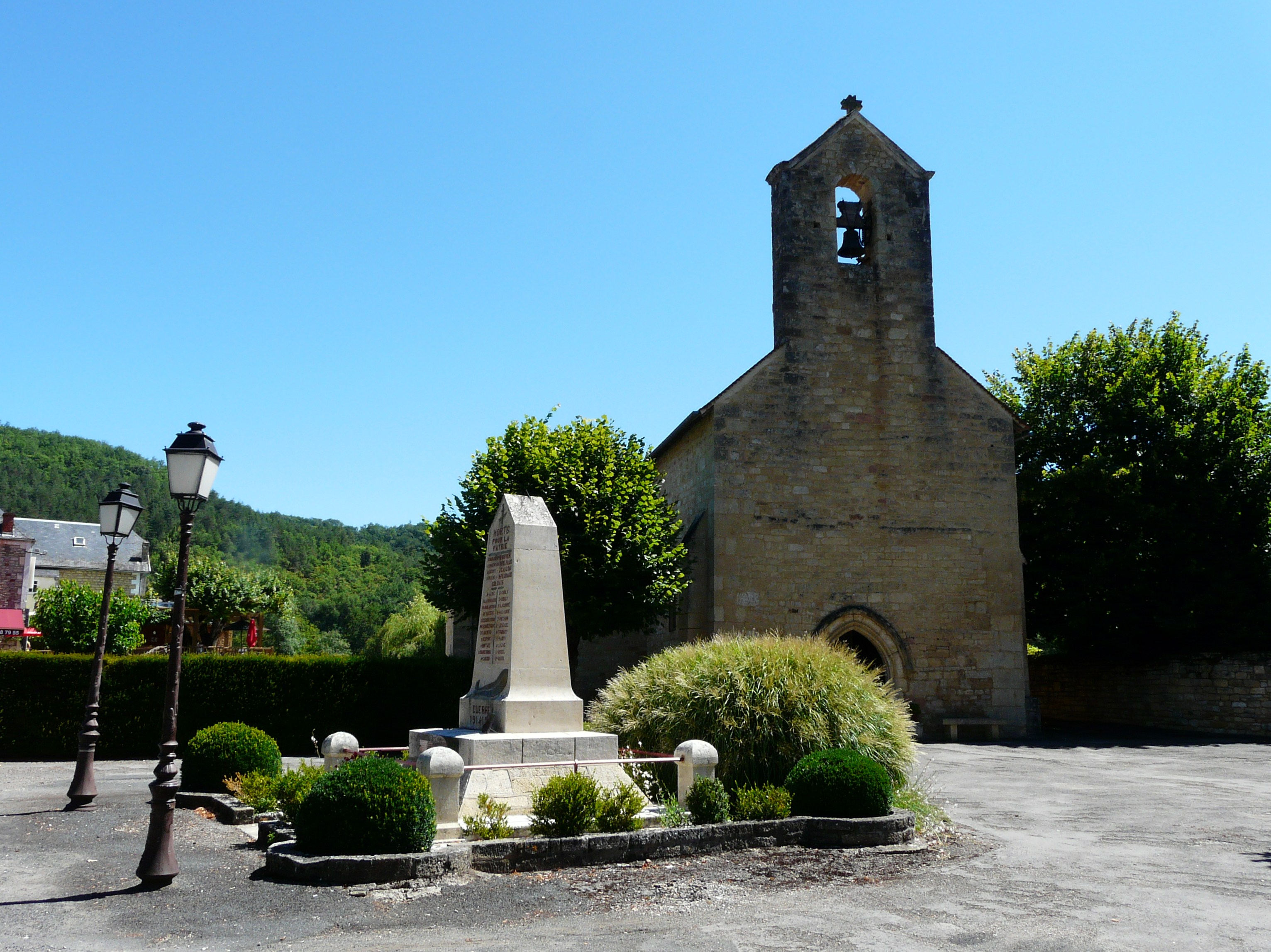
- The church and war memorial in Saint-Cybran

- Coat of arms
- Location of Saint-Cybranet
- Location within France Location within Nouvelle-Aquitaine
- Coordinates: 44°47′21″N 1°10′15″E
- Country: France
- Region: Nouvelle-Aquitaine
- Department: Dordogne
- Arrondissement: Sarlat-la-Canéda
- Canton: Vallée Dordogne
- Intercommunality: Domme - Villefranche du Périgord

Government
  - Mayor (2020–2026): Nelly Caminade
- Area^{1}: 10.33 km^{2} (3.99 sq mi)
- Elevation: 78 m (256 ft)
- Highest elevation: 270 m (890 ft)
- Lowest elevation: 70 m (230 ft)
- Population (2023): 384
  - Density: 37.2/km^{2} (96.3/sq mi)
- Time zone: UTC+01:00 (CET)
  - Summer (DST): UTC+02:00 (CEST)
- INSEE/Postal code: 24395 /24250
- ^{1} French Land Register data, which excludes lakes, ponds, glaciers > 1 km^{2} (0.386 sq mi or 247 acres) and river estuaries.

Saint-Cybranet (French pronunciation: [sɛ̃ sibʁanɛ]; Occitan: Sent Cibranet) is a commune in the Dordogne department in Nouvelle-Aquitaine in southwestern France.

== Geography ==
The river Céou forms part of the commune's southeastern border, then flows north-northwest through its eastern part.

== Population ==
Historical population
| Year | Pop. | ±% p.a. |
|---|---|---|
| 1968 | 277 | — |
| 1975 | 273 | −0.21% |
| 1982 | 280 | +0.36% |
| 1990 | 310 | +1.28% |
| 1999 | 350 | +1.36% |
| 2007 | 370 | +0.70% |
| 2012 | 402 | +1.67% |
| 2017 | 385 | −0.86% |
| 2023 | 384 | −0.04% |
Source: INSEE

== See also ==
- Communes of the Dordogne department
