= Florimont-Gaumier =

- Commune
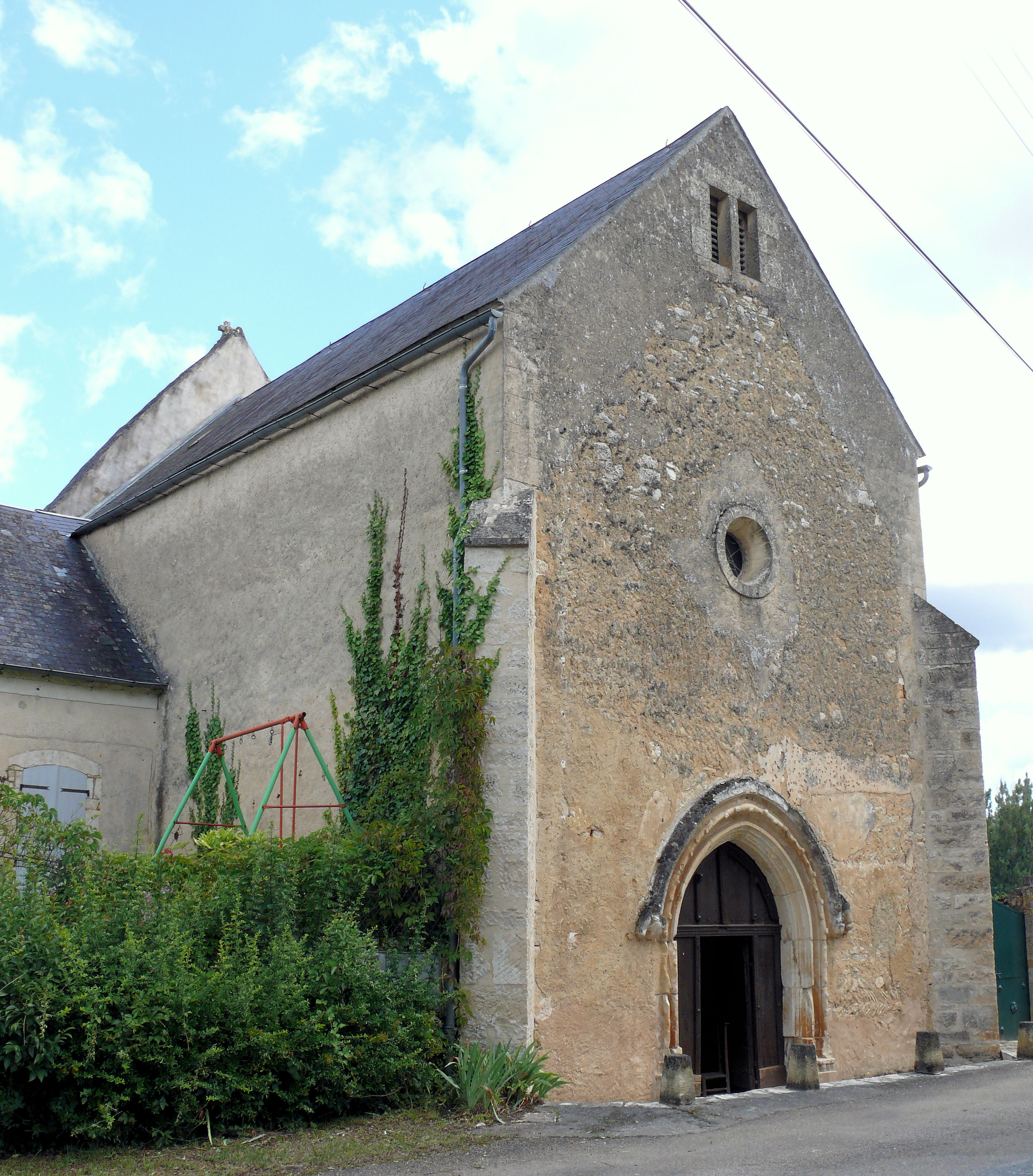
- The church in Gaumier
- Location of Florimont-Gaumier
- Location within France Location within Nouvelle-Aquitaine
- Coordinates: 44°42′00″N 1°14′25″E
- Country: France
- Region: Nouvelle-Aquitaine
- Department: Dordogne
- Arrondissement: Sarlat-la-Canéda
- Canton: Vallée Dordogne

Government
  - Mayor (2020–2026): Jean-Marie Laval
- Area^{1}: 9.05 km^{2} (3.49 sq mi)
- Elevation: 265 m (869 ft)
- Highest elevation: 288 m (945 ft)
- Lowest elevation: 116 m (381 ft)
- Population (2023): 170
  - Density: 19/km^{2} (49/sq mi)
- Time zone: UTC+01:00 (CET)
  - Summer (DST): UTC+02:00 (CEST)
- INSEE/Postal code: 24184 /24250
- ^{1} French Land Register data, which excludes lakes, ponds, glaciers > 1 km^{2} (0.386 sq mi or 247 acres) and river estuaries.

Florimont-Gaumier (French pronunciation: [flɔʁimɔ̃ ɡomje]; Occitan: Florimont e Gaumièr) is a commune in the Dordogne department in Nouvelle-Aquitaine in southwestern France.

== Geography ==
The river Céou forms part of the commune's northern border.

== Population ==
Historical population
Year	Pop.	±% p.a.
1968	252	—
1975	230	−1.30%
1982	181	−3.36%
1990	164	−1.23%
1999	132	−2.38%
2007	141	+0.83%
2012	141	+0.00%
2017	142	+0.14%
2023	170	+3.04%
Source: INSEE

== See also ==
- Communes of the Dordogne department
