= Léon Talou =

French politician (1835–1900)

Jean Léon Talou
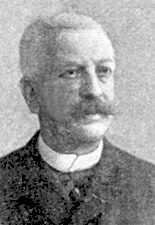
- Talou c. 1880

Deputy of Lot
- In office 1889–1897

Senator of Lot
- In office 3 January 1897 – 11 January 1900

Personal details
- Born: 15 August 1835 Francoulès, Lot, France.
- Died: 11 January 1900 (aged 64) Paris, France
- Occupation: Politician

Jean Léon Talou (15 August 1835 – 11 January 1900) was a French lawyer and politician who was deputy and then senator for the department of Lot.

== Early years ==
Jean Léon Talou was born on 15 August 1835 in Francoulès, Lot. He completed his classical studies at the Lycee of Cahors. Gambetta was his classmate and later his friend. He studied law at the faculties of Toulouse and Paris, obtain his license, and purchased the office of advocate at the Cahors civil court.

== Departmental politics ==
Talou was involved in politics early in his career, and was strongly opposed to the imperial regime. In 1870 he was elected municipal councilor of Cahors as opposition candidate. In 1871 he was elected to the General Counsel of Lot. He failed to be reelected in 1874, defeated by the former minister Depeyre. He was reelected to the General Counsel of Lot in 1880. In 1886 he was reelected to the General Counsel of Lot, defeated Count Murat the younger.

== National politics ==
In the legislative elections of 22 September 1889 Talou defeated the incumbent Count Joachim Joseph André Murat the elder of the Appel au peuple group. He was reelected for the first district of Cahors, Lot, in 1893. Talou sat and voted with the radical group. Léon Talou was elected Senator for Lot on 3 January 1897. He was a knight of the Legion of Honour. He died in office on 11 January 1900 in Paris.

== Sources ==
- Jolly, Jean (1960–1977), "TALOU, JEAN, LÉON", Dictionnaire des parlementaires français de 1889 à 1940 (in French), Paris: Éditeur : Presses universitaires de France, ISBN 2-1100-1998-0
- Jolly, Jean (1960–1977b), "MURAT, JOACHIM, JOSEPH, ANDRÉ", Dictionnaire des parlementaires français de 1889 à 1940 (in French), Paris: Éditeur : Presses universitaires de France, ISBN 2-1100-1998-0
- TALOU Léon (in French), Senate of France
