= Bouzic =

- Commune
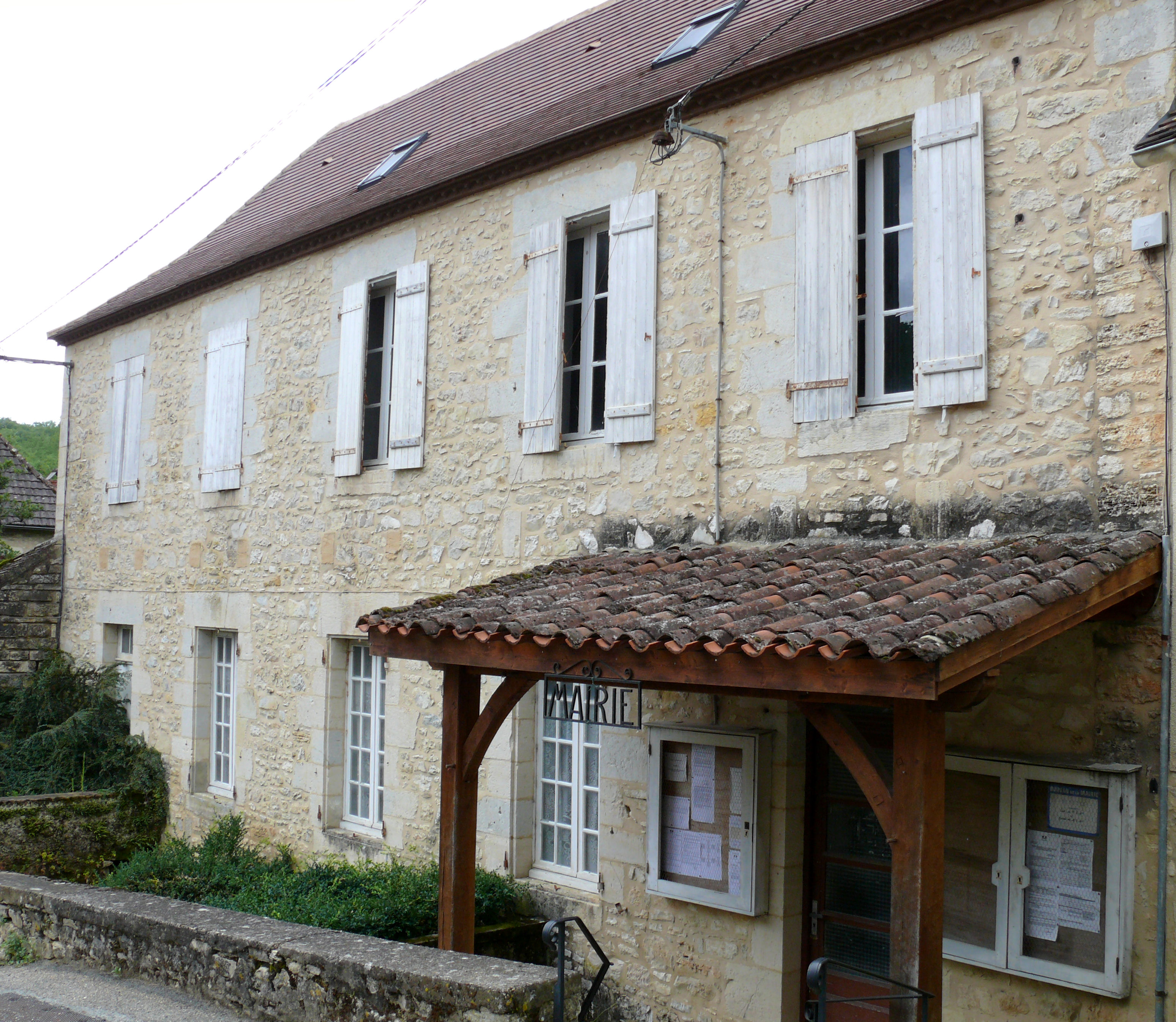
- The town hall in Bouzic
- Location of Bouzic
- Location within France Location within Nouvelle-Aquitaine
- Coordinates: 44°43′38″N 1°13′13″E
- Country: France
- Region: Nouvelle-Aquitaine
- Department: Dordogne
- Arrondissement: Sarlat-la-Canéda
- Canton: Vallée Dordogne

Government
  - Mayor (2020–2026): Patricia Boucher
- Area^{1}: 11.76 km^{2} (4.54 sq mi)
- Elevation: 150 m (490 ft)
- Highest elevation: 310 m (1,020 ft)
- Lowest elevation: 106 m (348 ft)
- Population (2023): 160
  - Density: 14/km^{2} (35/sq mi)
- Time zone: UTC+01:00 (CET)
  - Summer (DST): UTC+02:00 (CEST)
- INSEE/Postal code: 24063 /24250
- ^{1} French Land Register data, which excludes lakes, ponds, glaciers > 1 km^{2} (0.386 sq mi or 247 acres) and river estuaries.

Bouzic (French pronunciation: [buzik]; Occitan: Bosic) is a commune in the Dordogne department in southwestern France.

== Geography ==
The river Céou forms part of the commune's northeastern border, then flows west through its northern part.

== Population ==
Historical population
Year	Pop.	±% p.a.
1968	148	—
1975	141	−0.69%
1982	128	−1.37%
1990	133	+0.48%
1999	132	−0.08%
2007	134	+0.19%
2012	146	+1.73%
2017	151	+0.68%
2023	160	+0.97%
Source: INSEE

== See also ==
- Communes of the Dordogne département
