= Concorès =

- Commune
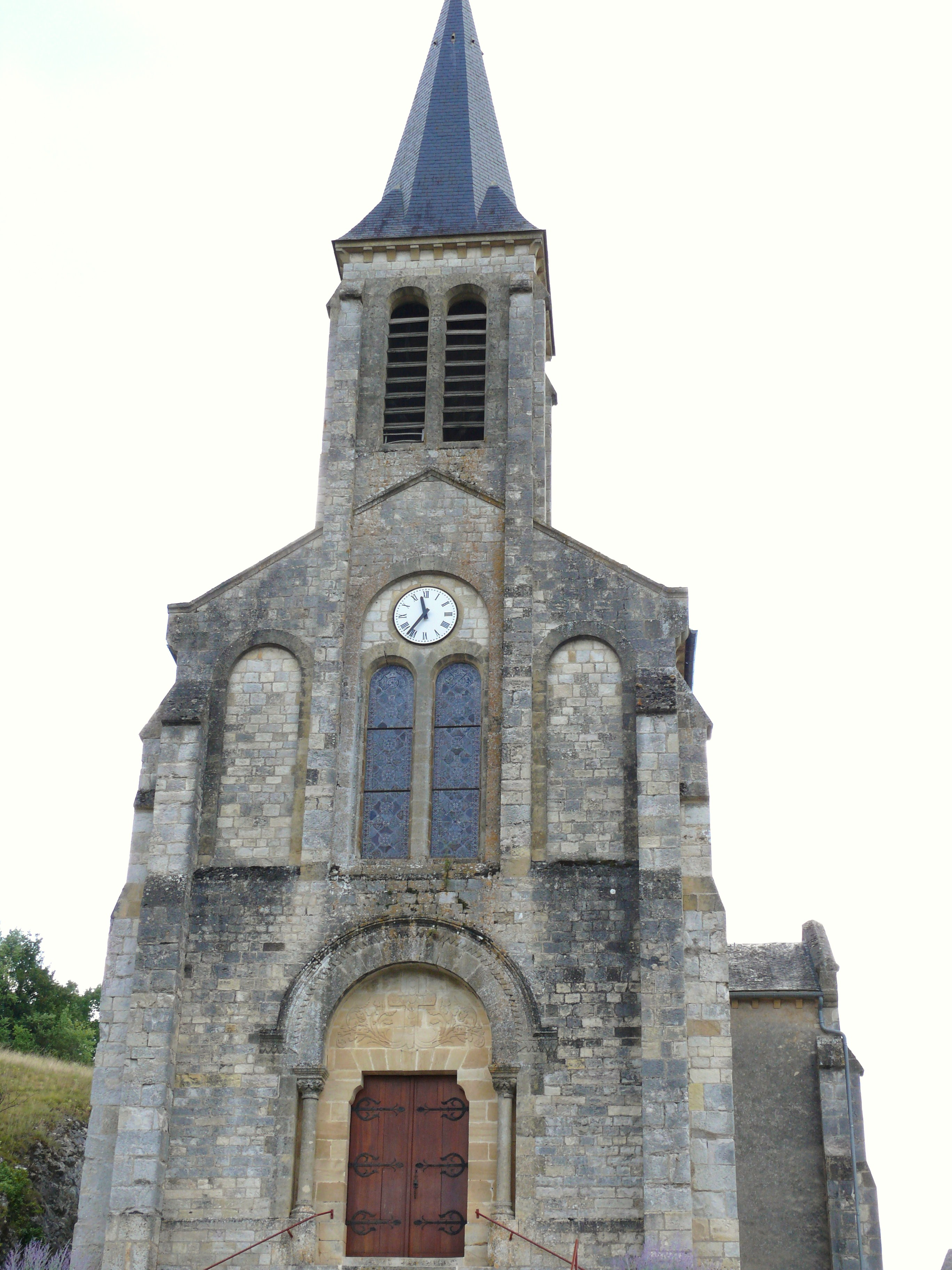
- The church in Concorès
- Location of Concorès
- Location within France Location within Occitanie
- Coordinates: 44°39′35″N 1°23′45″E
- Country: France
- Region: Occitania
- Department: Lot
- Arrondissement: Gourdon
- Canton: Causse et Bouriane
- Intercommunality: CC Quercy-Bouriane

Government
  - Mayor (2020–2026): Gérard Gaydou
- Area^{1}: 19 km^{2} (7.3 sq mi)
- Elevation: 317 m (1,040 ft)
- Highest elevation: 365 m (1,198 ft)
- Lowest elevation: 150 m (490 ft)
- Population (2023): 312
  - Density: 16/km^{2} (43/sq mi)
- Time zone: UTC+01:00 (CET)
  - Summer (DST): UTC+02:00 (CEST)
- INSEE/Postal code: 46072 /46310
- ^{1} French Land Register data, which excludes lakes, ponds, glaciers > 1 km^{2} (0.386 sq mi or 247 acres) and river estuaries.

Concorès (French pronunciation: [kɔ̃kɔʁɛs]) is a commune in the Lot department in south-western area of France.

== Geography ==
The village lies on the right bank of the Céou, which flows northwestward through the commune.

== See also ==
- Communes of the Lot department
