= Saint-Chamarand =

- Commune
- Location of Saint-Chamarand
- Location within France Location within Occitanie
- Coordinates: 44°40′46″N 1°27′42″E
- Country: France
- Region: Occitania
- Department: Lot
- Arrondissement: Gourdon
- Canton: Causse et Bouriane
- Intercommunality: Quercy-Bouriane

Government
  - Mayor (2020–2026): Sandra Feffer
- Area^{1}: 13.09 km^{2} (5.05 sq mi)
- Elevation: 320 m (1,050 ft)
- Highest elevation: 384 m (1,260 ft)
- Lowest elevation: 213 m (699 ft)
- Population (2023): 192
  - Density: 14.7/km^{2} (38.0/sq mi)
- Time zone: UTC+01:00 (CET)
  - Summer (DST): UTC+02:00 (CEST)
- INSEE/Postal code: 46253 /46310
- ^{1} French Land Register data, which excludes lakes, ponds, glaciers > 1 km^{2} (0.386 sq mi or 247 acres) and river estuaries.

Saint-Chamarand (French pronunciation: [sɛ̃ ʃamaʁɑ̃]; Occitan: Sench Amarand) is a commune in the Lot department in south-western France.

== Geography ==
The river Céou flows westward through the southern part of the commune.

== See also ==
- Communes of the Lot department
