= Céou =

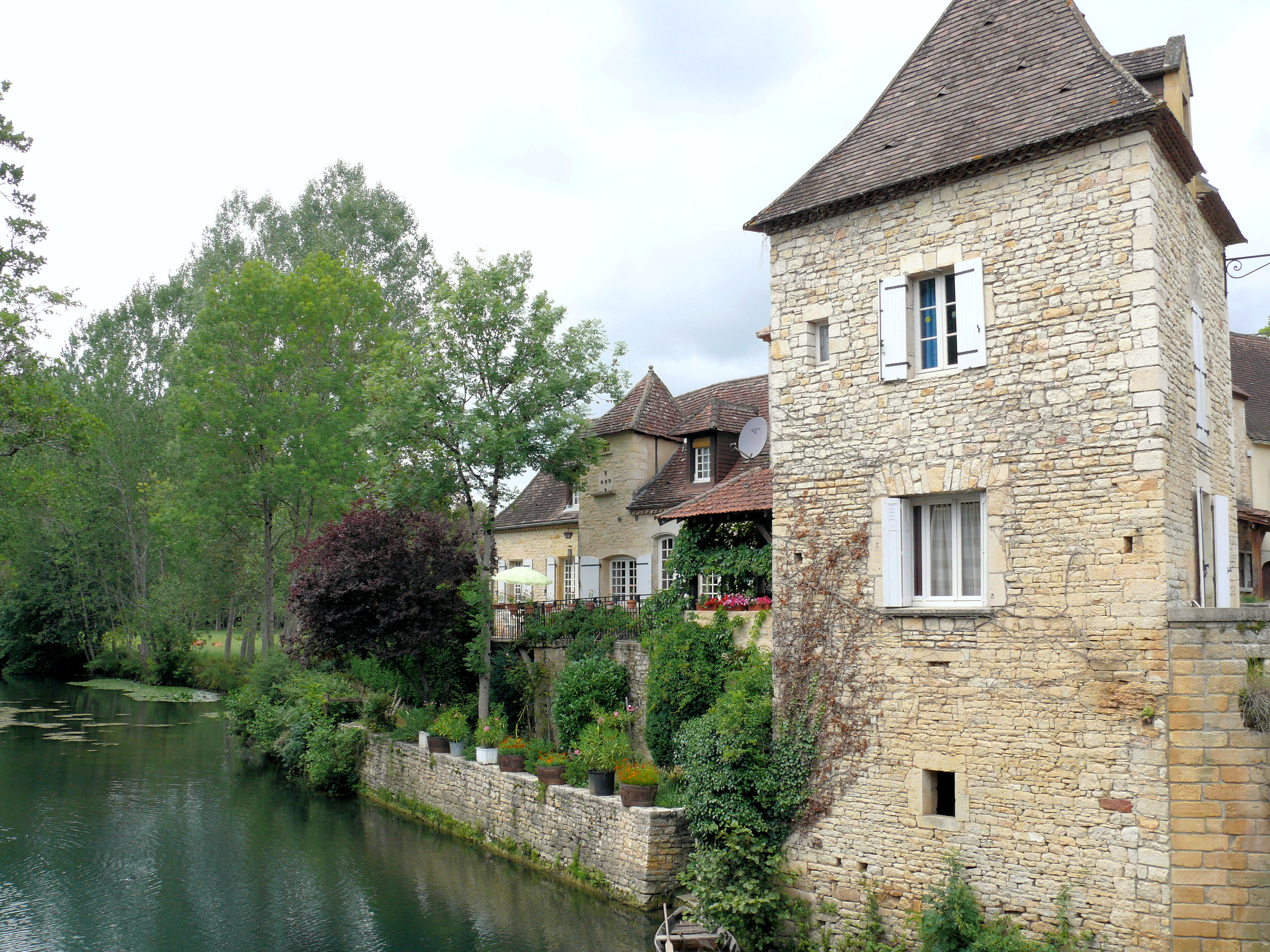

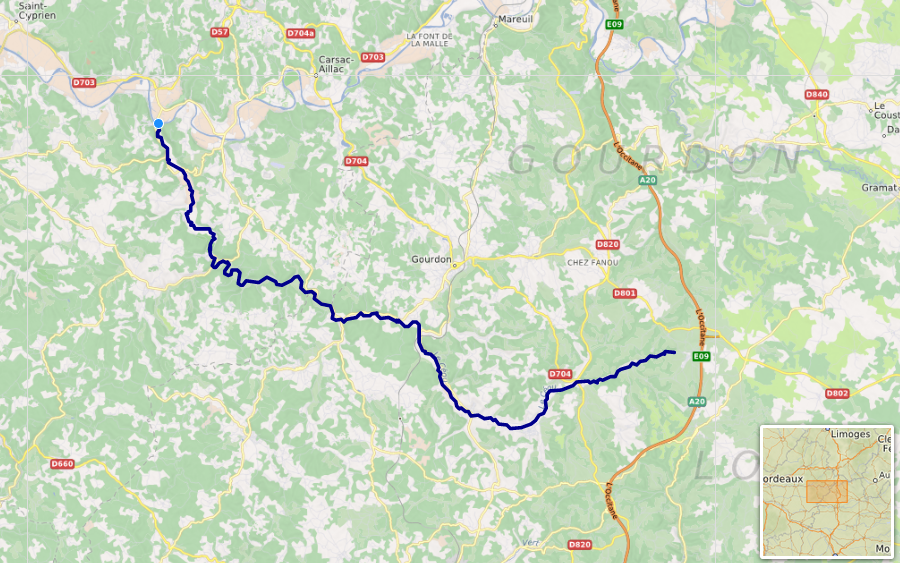

Location
- Country: France

Physical characteristics
- Source
  - location: Séniergues
  - coordinates: 44°21′24″N 01°32′47″E
  - elevation: 275 m (902 ft)
- Mouth
  - location: Dordogne
  - coordinates: 44°48′50″N 01°09′15″E
  - elevation: 65 m (213 ft)
- Length: 55.1 km (34.2 mi)
- Basin size: 610 km^{2} (240 sq mi)
- Discharge
  - average: 3.37 m^{3}/s (119 cu ft/s)

Basin features
- Progression: Dordogne→ Gironde estuary→ Atlantic Ocean

The Céou (French pronunciation: [seu]) is a 55.1 km (34.2 mi) long river in the Lot and Dordogne départements, southwestern France. Its source is at Séniergues, 13 km (8.1 mi) southwest of Rocamadour. It flows generally northwest. It is a left tributary of the Dordogne into which it flows at Castelnaud-la-Chapelle, 9 km (5.6 mi) southwest of Sarlat-la-Canéda.

== Communes along its course ==
This list is ordered from source to mouth:

- Lot: Séniergues, Montfaucon, Vaillac, Beaumat, Frayssinet, Saint-Chamarand, Saint-Germain-du-Bel-Air, Concorès, Dégagnac, Gourdon, Léobard, Salviac
- Dordogne: Saint-Aubin-de-Nabirat, Florimont-Gaumier, Saint-Martial-de-Nabirat, Bouzic, Daglan, Cénac-et-Saint-Julien, Saint-Cybranet, Castelnaud-la-Chapelle
