= List of senators of Lot =

Location of Lot in France

Following is a list of senators of Lot, people who have represented the department of Lot in the Senate of France.

== Third Republic ==
Senators for Lot under the French Third Republic were:

- Octave Depeyre (1876–1879)
- Paul Delord (1879–1883)
- François Roques (1879–1882)
- Eloi Béral (1883–1897) and (1906–1908)
- Henri de Verninac-Saint-Maur (1883–1901)
- Joseph Pauliac (1891–1906) and (1909)
- Léon Talou (1897–1900)
- Amédée Delport (1900)
- Jean Cocula (1901–1915)
- Jean Costes (1901–1906)
- Émile Rey (1906–1920)
- Joseph Loubet (1909–1940)
- Anatole de Monzie (1920–1929)
- René Fontanille (1920–1940)
- Louis Garrigou (1930–1940)

== Fourth Republic ==
Senators for Lot under the French Fourth Republic were:

- Pierre Boudet (1946–1955)
- Gaston Monnerville (1948–1959)
- Marc Baudru (1955–1959)

== Fifth Republic ==
Senators for Lot under the French Fifth Republic:

Period	Name	Party or group	Notes
1959–1974	Gaston Monnerville	Gauche Démocratique	Resigned 5 March 1974
1974–1983	Georges Constant	Gauche Démocratique	
1983–1988	Maurice Faure	Gauche Démocratique	Joined cabinet 12 June 1988
1983–1992	Marcel Costes	Socialiste	
1988–2008	André Boyer	Rassemblement Démocratique et Social Européen	Replaced Maurice Faure on 13 June 1988; Died in office 24 September 2008
1992–2017	Gérard Miquel	La République En Marche	
2008–2011	Jean Milhau	Rassemblement Démocratique et Social Européen	
from 2011	Jean-Claude Requier	Radical Party of the Left (PRG)	Reelected 24 September 2017
from 2017	Angèle Préville	Socialist and Republican group (SOC)	Elected 24 September 2017

== Sources ==
- Liste des anciens sénateurs de la IIIème République par circonscription (in French), Sénat de France
- Liste des anciens sénateurs de la IVème République par circonscription (in French), Sénat de France
- Liste des anciens sénateurs de la Vème République par circonscription (in French), Sénat de France
- Liste par département - Lot (in French), Sénat de France
