= Fontanes-du-Causse =

- Part of Cœur de Causse
- Location of Fontanes-du-Causse
- Location within France Location within Occitanie
- Coordinates: 44°40′01″N 1°39′42″E
- Country: France
- Region: Occitania
- Department: Lot
- Arrondissement: Gourdon
- Canton: Causse et Vallées
- Commune: Cœur de Causse
- Area^{1}: 15.01 km^{2} (5.80 sq mi)
- Elevation: 390 m (1,280 ft)
- Highest elevation: 442 m (1,450 ft)
- Lowest elevation: 337 m (1,106 ft)
- Population (2022): 62
  - Density: 4.1/km^{2} (11/sq mi)
- Time zone: UTC+01:00 (CET)
  - Summer (DST): UTC+02:00 (CEST)
- Postal code: 46240
- ^{1} French Land Register data, which excludes lakes, ponds, glaciers > 1 km^{2} (0.386 sq mi or 247 acres) and river estuaries.

Fontanes-du-Causse (French pronunciation: [fɔ̃tan dy kos]; Languedocien: Fontanas del Causse) is a former commune in the Lot department in south-western France. On 1 January 2016, it was merged into the new commune of Cœur de Causse. Its population was 62 in 2022.

== See also ==
- Communes of the Lot department
