= Cœur de Causse =

- Commune
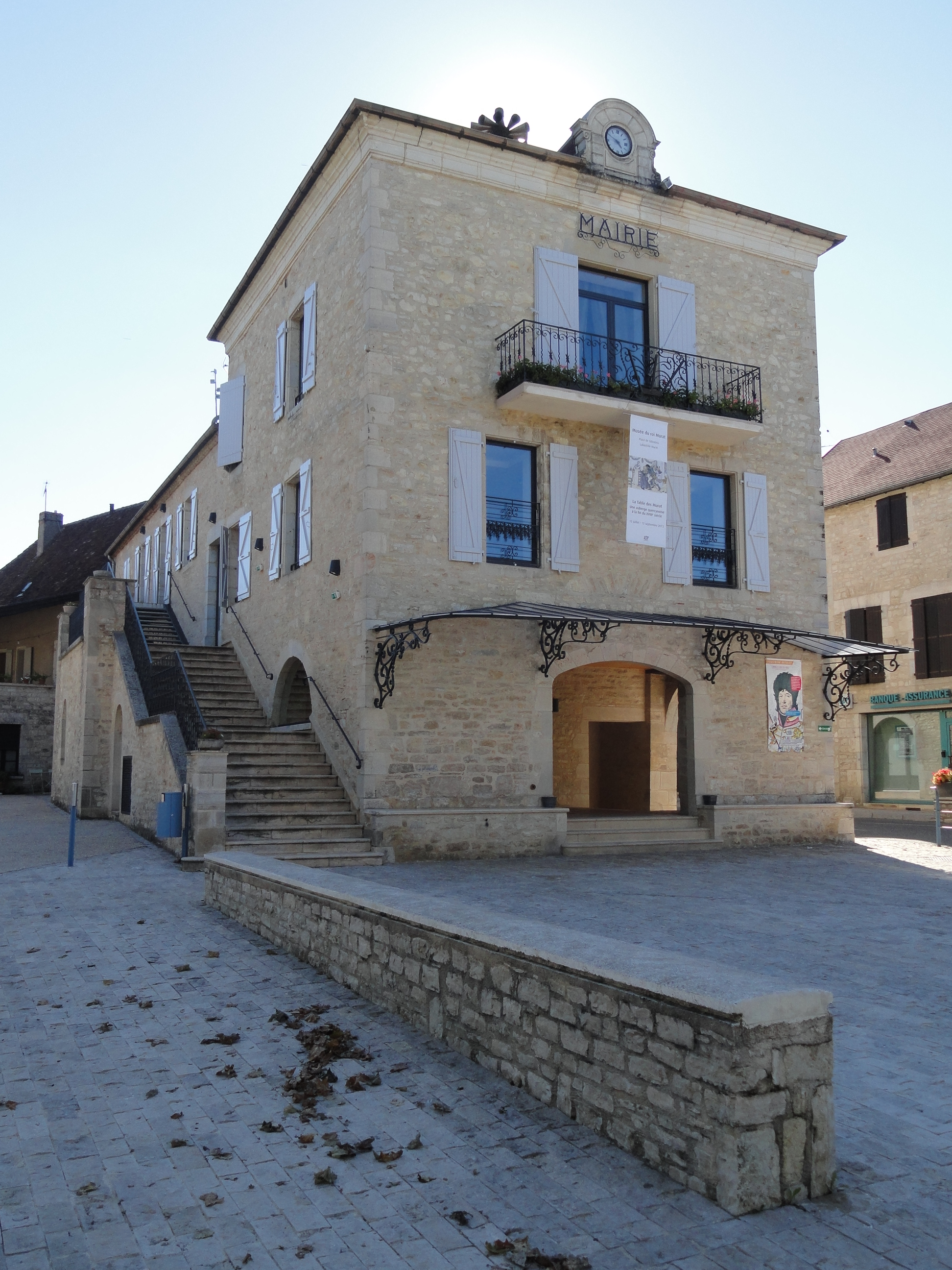
- The town hall in Labastide-Murat
- Location of Cœur de Causse
- Location within France Location within Occitanie
- Coordinates: 44°38′49″N 1°34′05″E
- Country: France
- Region: Occitania
- Department: Lot
- Arrondissement: Gourdon
- Canton: Causse et Vallées

Government
  - Mayor (2020–2026): René Courdès
- Area^{1}: 70.76 km^{2} (27.32 sq mi)
- Population (2023): 886
  - Density: 12.5/km^{2} (32.4/sq mi)
- Time zone: UTC+01:00 (CET)
  - Summer (DST): UTC+02:00 (CEST)
- INSEE/Postal code: 46138 /46240
- ^{1} French Land Register data, which excludes lakes, ponds, glaciers > 1 km^{2} (0.386 sq mi or 247 acres) and river estuaries.

Cœur de Causse (French pronunciation: [kœʁ də kos]; Languedocien: Còr de Causse) is a commune in the department of Lot, southern France. The municipality was established on 1 January 2016 by merger of the former communes of Labastide-Murat, Beaumat, Fontanes-du-Causse, Saint-Sauveur-la-Vallée and Vaillac.

== See also ==
- Communes of the Lot department
