= Vaillac =

- Part of Cœur de Causse
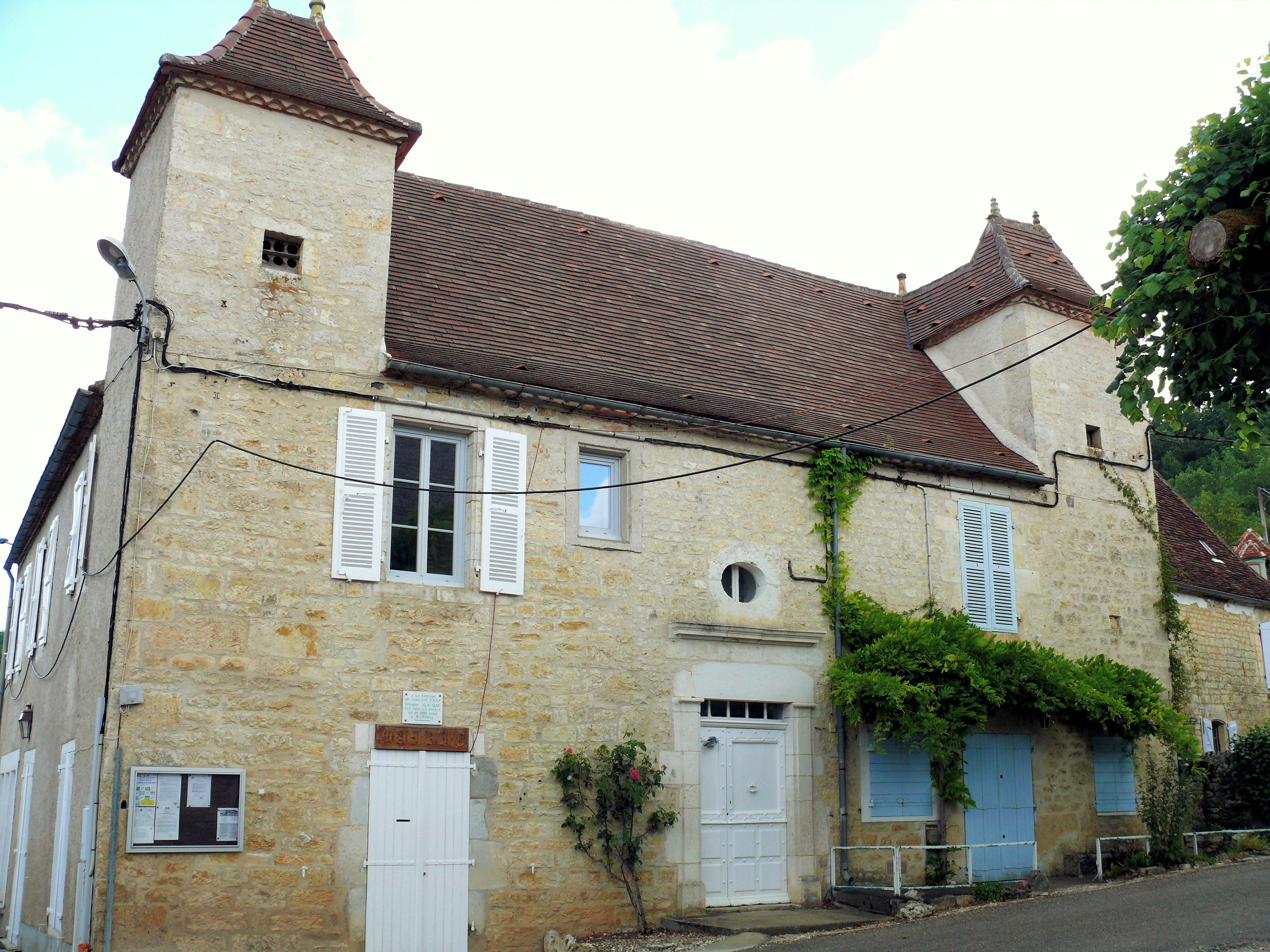
- The town hall in Vaillac
- Location of Vaillac
- Location within France Location within Occitanie
- Coordinates: 44°40′32″N 1°31′50″E
- Country: France
- Region: Occitania
- Department: Lot
- Arrondissement: Gourdon
- Canton: Causse et Bouriane
- Commune: Cœur de Causse
- Area^{1}: 13.68 km^{2} (5.28 sq mi)
- Elevation: 275 m (902 ft)
- Highest elevation: 422 m (1,385 ft)
- Lowest elevation: 239 m (784 ft)
- Population (2022): 95
  - Density: 6.9/km^{2} (18/sq mi)
- Time zone: UTC+01:00 (CET)
  - Summer (DST): UTC+02:00 (CEST)
- Postal code: 46240
- ^{1} French Land Register data, which excludes lakes, ponds, glaciers > 1 km^{2} (0.386 sq mi or 247 acres) and river estuaries.

Vaillac (French pronunciation: [vajak]; Languedocien: Valhac) is a former commune in the Lot department in south-western France. On 1 January 2016, it was merged into the new commune of Cœur de Causse.

== Geography ==
The village lies in the middle of the commune, in the valley of the Foulon, a stream tributary of the Céou, which flows westward through the northern part of the commune. There is a castle on the hill overlooking the village that is occasionally open to the public.

== Sights and monuments ==
- The Château de Vaillac is a castle containing elements from the 14th, 15th, 16th and 17th centuries.
- Église Saint-Julien, 14th - 15th century church
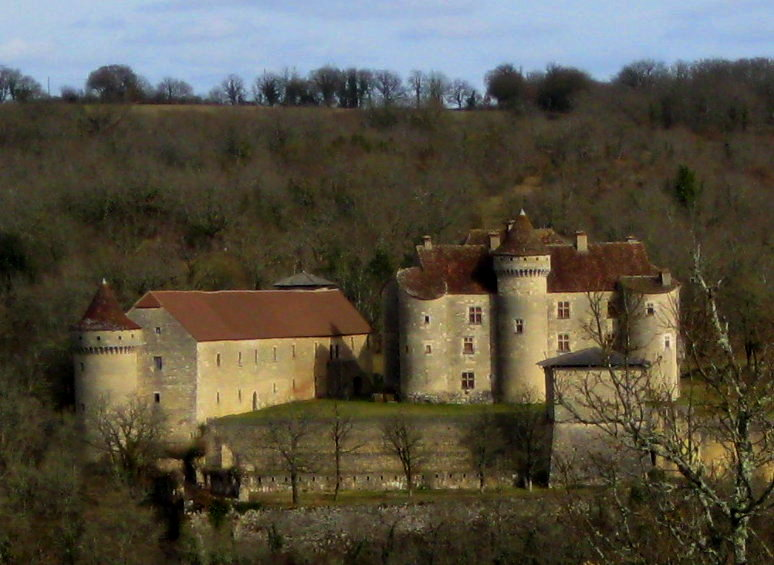
Château de Vaillac.

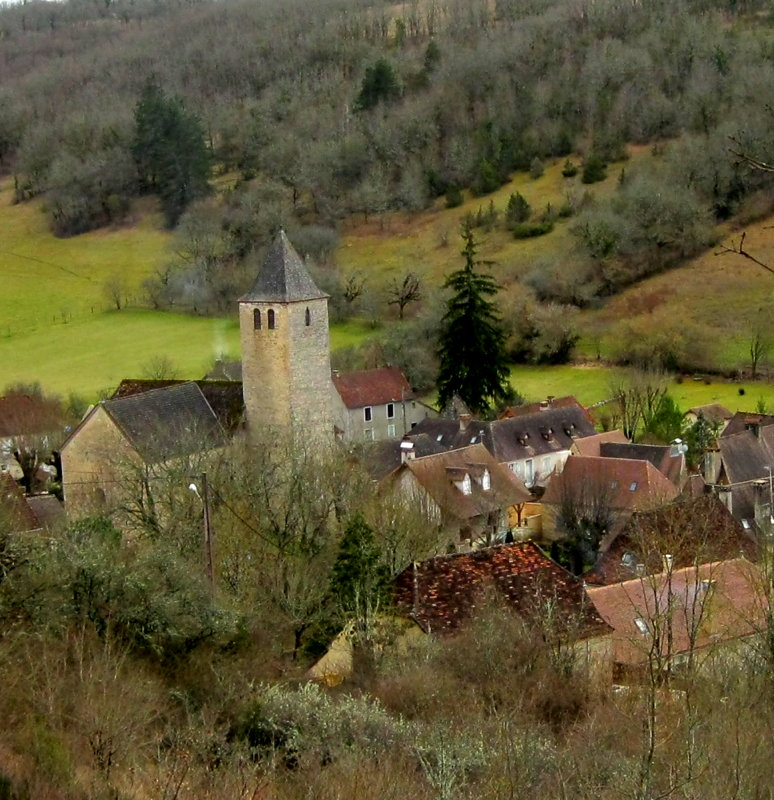
Vie of the church and the village.

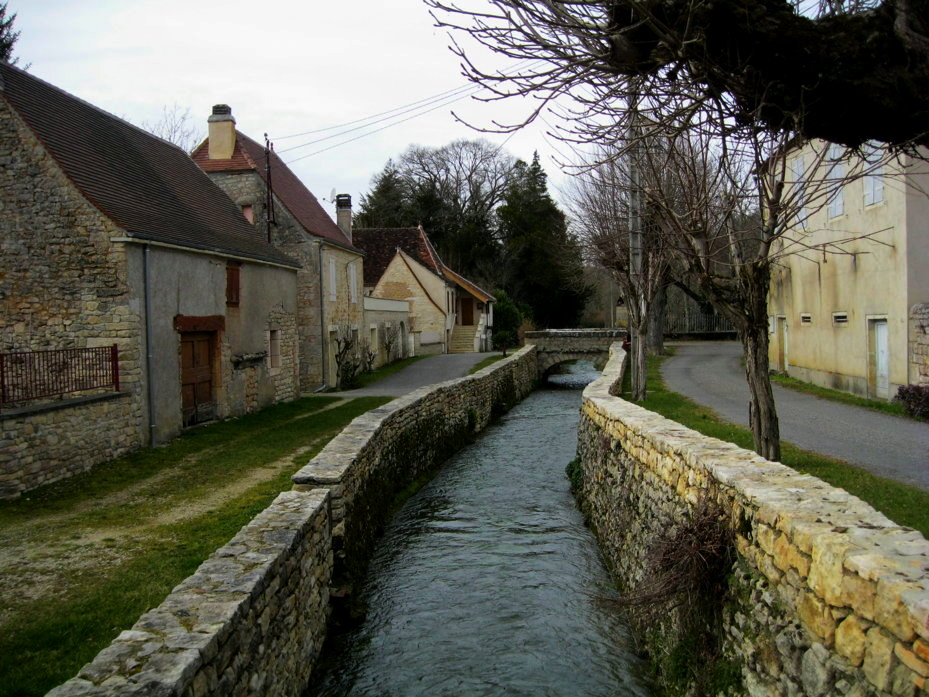
Foulon brook.

== See also ==
- Communes of the Lot department
