= Labastide-Murat =

- Part of Cœur de Causse
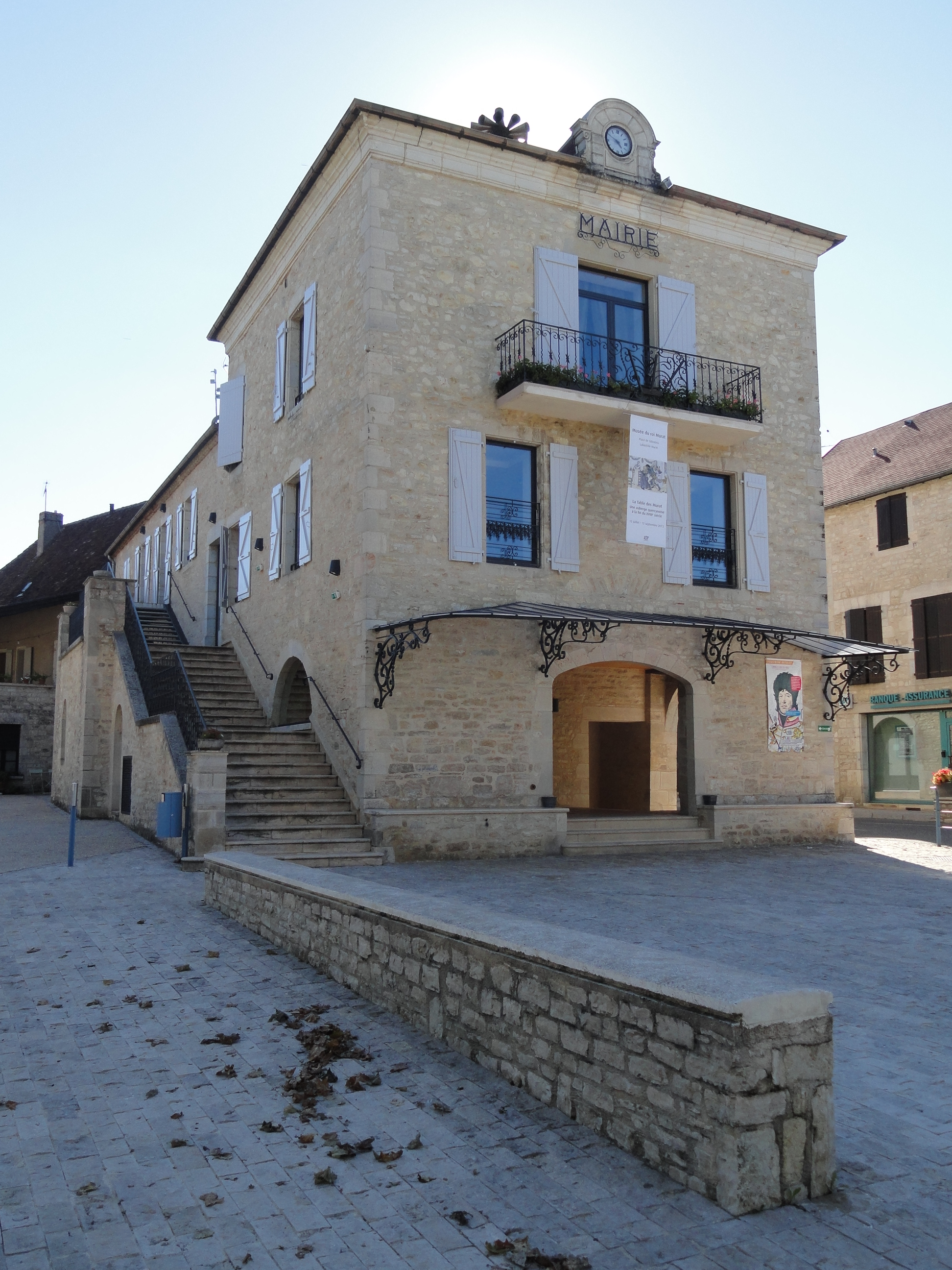
- The town hall in Labastide-Murat
- Location of Labastide-Murat
- Location within France Location within Occitanie
- Coordinates: 44°38′53″N 1°34′06″E
- Country: France
- Region: Occitania
- Department: Lot
- Arrondissement: Gourdon
- Canton: Causse et Vallées
- Commune: Cœur de Causse
- Area^{1}: 27.27 km^{2} (10.53 sq mi)
- Elevation: 447 m (1,467 ft)
- Highest elevation: 449 m (1,473 ft)
- Lowest elevation: 265 m (869 ft)
- Population (2022): 611
  - Density: 22.4/km^{2} (58.0/sq mi)
- Time zone: UTC+01:00 (CET)
  - Summer (DST): UTC+02:00 (CEST)
- Postal code: 46240
- ^{1} French Land Register data, which excludes lakes, ponds, glaciers > 1 km^{2} (0.386 sq mi or 247 acres) and river estuaries.

Labastide-Murat (French pronunciation: [labastid myʁa]), formerly Labastide-Fortunière (Lengadocian: La Bastida Fortunièra), is a former commune in the Lot department in south-western France. On 1 January 2016, it was merged into the new commune of Cœur de Causse. It was renamed after Napoleon Bonaparte's brother-in-law and famed Marshal of France Joachim Murat, who was born there in 1767.

== See also ==
- Communes of the Lot department
