= Carol Janeway =

American ceramicist (1913–1989)

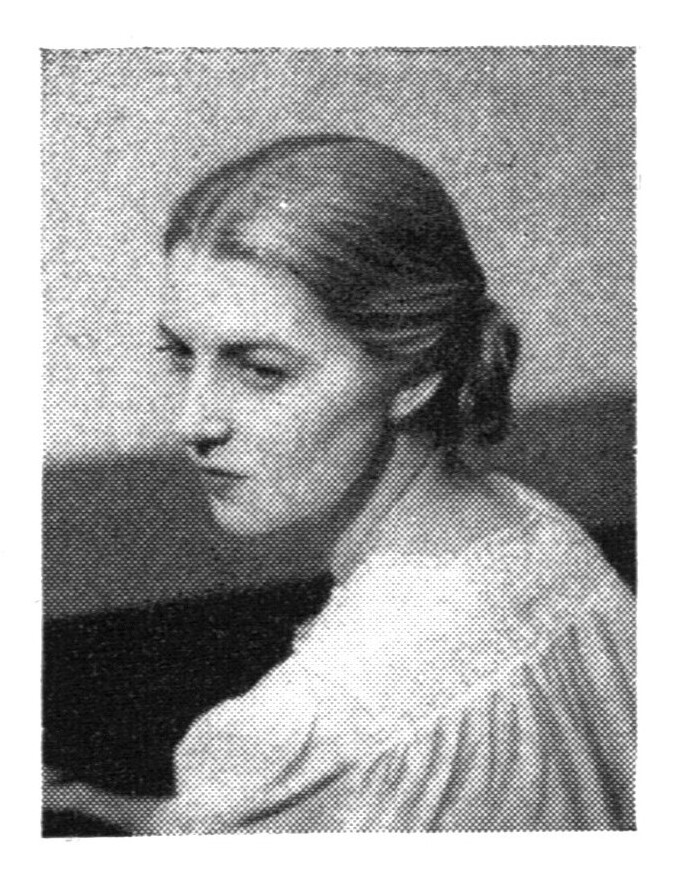
- Born: 2 October 1913; Brooklyn, Kings County, New York
- Died: 22 November 1989 (aged 76); New York, New York
- Education: Cornell University
- Known for: Tiles, Ceramics, Paintings; Greenwich Village Activism
- Movement: Primitivism
- Website: http://www.caroljaneway.com/

Carol Janeway (born Caroline Bacon Rindsfoos) (1913–1989) was a noted American ceramicist active in New York City in the 1940s and 1950s. She was active in the preservation of Greenwich Village starting in the late 1940s.

== Career ==
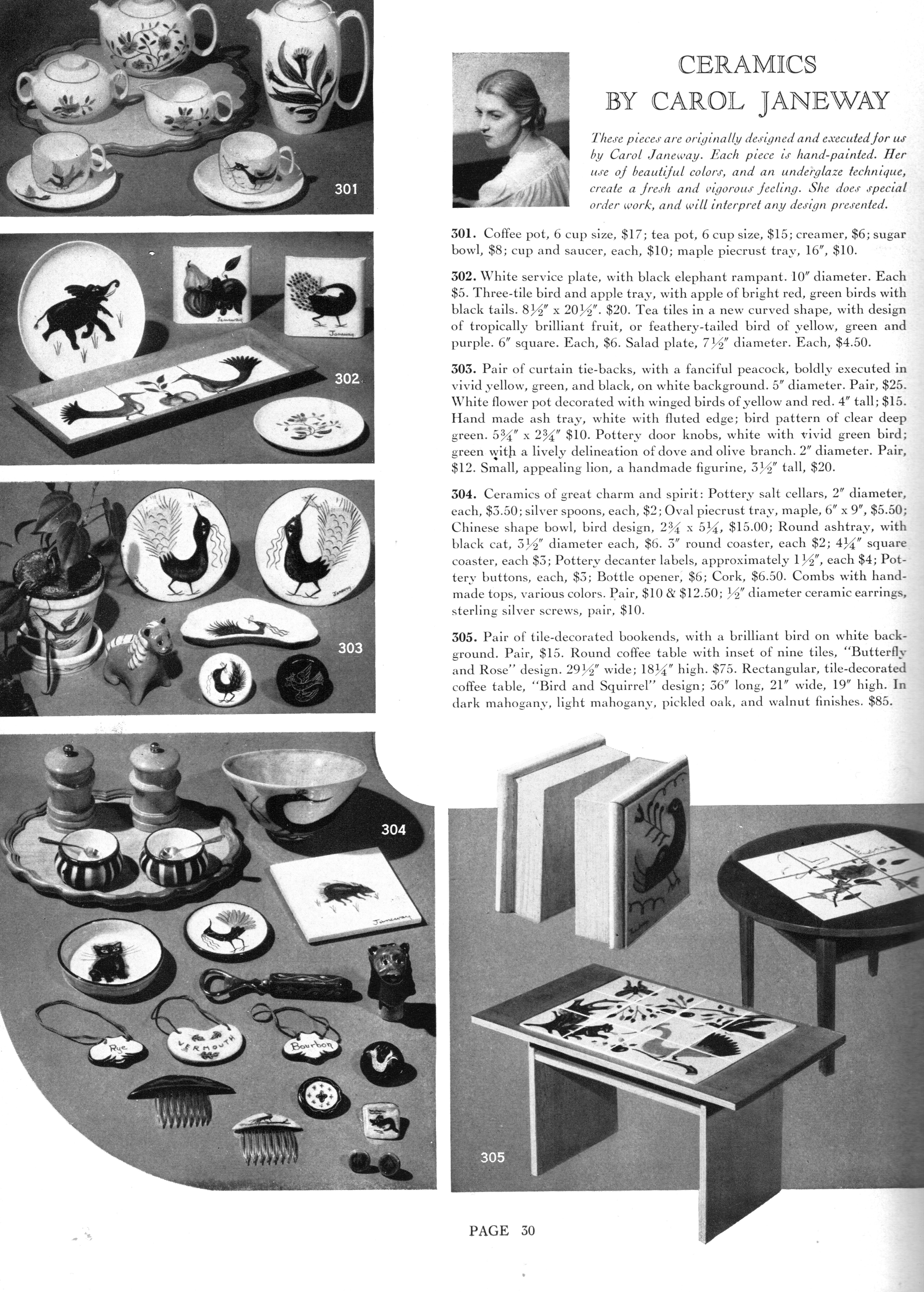
Decorated ceramics by Carol Janeway offered in 1945 mail-order catalog

The main venue for her ceramics was Georg Jensen Inc. (New York City) from 1942 -1949, while Gimbels, I. Magnin, Gumps and other stores also sold her wares. She collaborated with two other New York tile decorators: Harold Ambellan's Designed Tiles studio and Esteban Soriano. She had three successive studios in Greenwich Village until the early 1950s when she worked out of her home in Milligan Place in Greenwich Village. She was featured in a 1945 issue of Life Magazine for her work with ceramic tiles.

In 1947 Janeway was asked to submit designs for the noted British manufacturer Josiah Wedgwood & Sons however the firm did not put the designs into production. Two such Janeway plates appeared in the 1948 Wedgwood exhibition at the Brooklyn Museum.

She designed and produced a line of ceramic chess, backgammon, and checker sets. Of the 32 artists invited to exhibit in The Imagery of Chess, a dada-surrealist art event at the Julien Levy Gallery from December 1944 to January 1945, she was one of two female artists whose chess sets were featured.

She decorated many tile fireplace surrounds installed mainly in the New York area.

Her how-to ceramics book, Ceramics and Potterymaking for Everyone, was published in 1950 by Tudor Publishing Company as a part of a series. Her pamphlet, Ceramic Brushes: their selection, use, and care, was published in 1952 by Delta Brush Mfg. Corp., New York.

News of her diagnosis of lead poisoning leading to her retirement appeared in a 1950 "Lyons Den" column.

Works by Janeway are held by few museums, despite claims in her obituary. These are the Cooper-Hewitt Smithsonian Design Museum in New York City and the Philadelphia Museum of Art which holds Janeway's papers in addition to some tile work. Ceramic art by Janeway and additional papers were sold by her estate and are in a private collection.

== Greenwich Village Activist ==
From the 1950s she became increasingly active in preserving Greenwich Village working alongside Jane Jacobs, Doris Diether and Ruth Wittenberg among others. These women, in particular its long-lived Chair Doris Diether, founded in the 1960s what became Community Board II (CB2) in 1971, one of New York's earliest community boards. When Janeway was not serving on the CB2, she regularly attended the meetings. The successful campaign to preserve the two linked mews, Patchin Place and Milligan Place, started in 1962 with appeals by local groups to the City's Board of Estimates for rezoning. Janeway formed the Committee for the Preservation of Patchin and Milligan Place for this purpose.

A ceramics teacher at the infamous New York Women's House of Detention for two years, 1962–65, she testified in 1965 before New York County's Fourth May Grand Jury investigating the prison's notorious mistreatment of prisoners. Janeway distinguished herself as a witness by reporting in The Villager newspaper a four-article series describing her treatment by the prosecutor in the Grand Jury. Her colleague at the prison was social worker Sara Harris who in writing her 1967 exposé on the Women's House of Detention, Hellhole, relied on Janeway's items in The Villager in writing Chapter 12. While she was initially in favor of prison reform, once the building was emptied of prisoners in 1971 she and the Patchin and Milligan Place tenants group called for its demolition in 1973.

== Personal life ==
Born Caroline Bacon Rindsfoos in her maternal grandparents' home at 101 Rugby Road in Brooklyn, she and the family moved to Columbus, Ohio, in 1925 where her father, Charles Siesel Rindsfoos, joined his brother William in the Brunson Bank. She eloped in 1932 with fellow Cornell student Eliot Janeway and kept the name after the failure of the marriage in 1934. She lived in London from 1933 through 1939 with various trips to Moscow, Paris, Capri. She studied lithography in London. In Moscow in 1935 as a lithographer, she gave birth to her daughter, Helen Roe, renamed Kiske Janeway (1935-2022).

During World War Two, French sculptor Ossip Zadkine, in self-exile in New York, lived with her and mentored her artistic career. In 1942, several ceramicists trained her in ceramics: Anne T. Wright, William Suoini, Catherine Yarrow, C. Paul Freigang, Designed Tiles studio, and others. She was the subject of many portraits by artists including Zadkine, Maya Deren, and Tusnelda Sanders.

In 1956, amid tabloid coverage, a jury of 6 in NY Municipal Court recognized Janeway's claim on her 1 Milligan Place apartment, and scuttled the landlord's eviction, in an early example of palimony. Her fiancé/leaseholder had abandoned the relationship and the apartment leaving her to continue paying bills.

In 1987, daughter Kiske joined the Monastery of St. Clare, Evansville, Indiana, as Sister Catherine Kiske and died there in 2022.

Diagnosed with mouth cancer, Carol Janeway died of pneumonia in November 1989. Her will of 1988 bequeathed the liquidated assets of her estate to The People With Aids Coalition.

== Bibliography ==
- Janeway, Carol. Ceramics and Potterymaking for Everyone. (New York: Tudor Publishing Co.) 1950.
- Janeway, Carol. Ceramic Brushes: their selection, use and care. (New York: Delta Brush Mfg. Corp) 1952.
- Jenssen, Victoria, "Carol Janeway's Fanciful Doorknobs," in O Pioneers! Women Ceramic Artists 1925 - 1960. ed. Ezra Shales (Alfred, NY: Alfred Ceramic Art Museum) 2015, pp. 39–41.
- Jenssen, Victoria, foreword by Pat Kirkham, The Art of Carol Janeway: A Tile & Ceramics Career with Georg Jensen Inc. and Ossip Zadkine in 1940s Manhattan. (Friesen Press) 2022.
- List, Larry. The Imagery of Chess Revisited. (New York: Isamu Noguchi Foundation and Garden Museum) 2005.
- Tasse-Winter, Dena, Carol Janeway: Ceramicist and Fierce Village Advocate. Blog, June 9, 2023. https://www.villagepreservation.org/2023/06/09/carol-janeway-ceramicist-and-fierce-village-advocat
