= Screen printing =

Printing technique

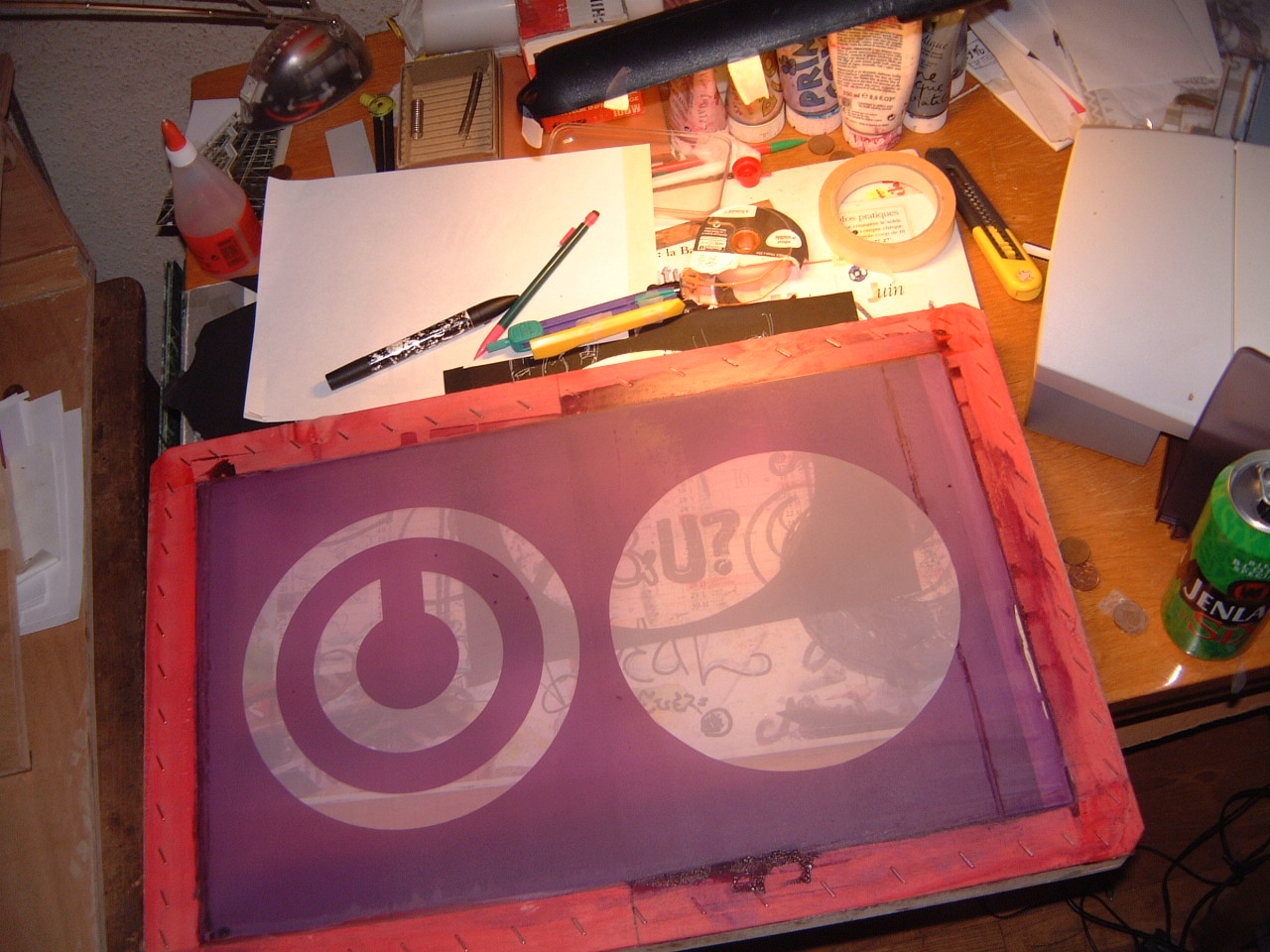
A silk screen design

Screen printing (also written as screenprinting and known as silkscreening or serigraphy) is a printing technique where a mesh is used to transfer paint ink (or dye) onto a substrate, except in areas made impermeable to the ink by a blocking stencil. A blade or squeegee is moved across the screen in a "flood stroke" to fill the open mesh apertures with ink, and a reverse stroke then causes the screen to touch the substrate momentarily along a line of contact. This causes the ink to wet the substrate and be pulled out of the mesh apertures as the screen springs back after the blade has passed. One colour is printed at a time, so several screens can be used to produce a multi-coloured image or design.

Traditionally, silk was used in the process. Currently, synthetic threads are commonly used. The most popular mesh in general use is made of polyester. There are special-use mesh materials of nylon and stainless steel available to the screen-printer. There are also different types of mesh size which will determine the outcome and look of the finished design on the material.

The technique is used for printing on many substances including garments, clock and watch faces, balloons, and many other products. Advanced uses include laying down conductors and resistors in multi-layer circuits using thin ceramic layers as the substrate.

== History ==
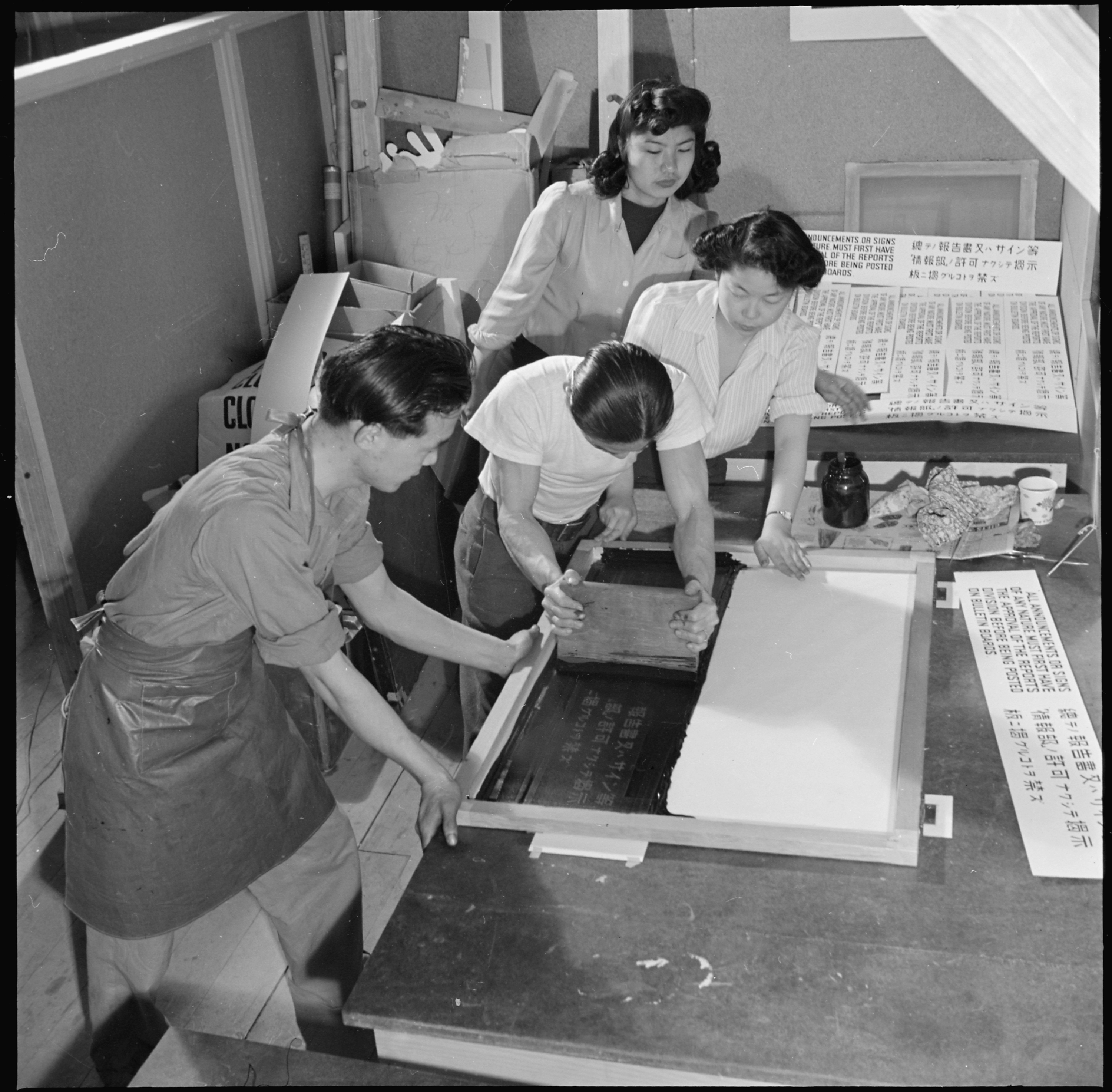
The poster shop at Heart Mountain War Relocation Center was operated by Japanese-American internees who used the silkscreen method to print information for the entire center. (January 1943)

=== Origin ===
Screen Printing takes its origin from block printing which originated in China, which was the influence for Japanese Ise katagami (伊勢型紙). Early records of Japanese stencils in the west indicate the art was introduced around 1873, which lines up with development of screen printing as it is known today.

=== Adoption in the West ===
Screen printing was largely introduced to Western Europe from Asia sometime in the late 18th century, but did not gain large acceptance or use in Europe until silk mesh was more available for trade from the east and a profitable outlet for the medium discovered.

In the early 1910s, several printers experimenting with photo-reactive chemicals used the actinic light–activated cross linking or hardening traits of potassium, sodium or ammonium chromate and dichromate chemicals with glues and gelatin compounds. Roy Beck, Charles Peter and Edward Owens studied and experimented with chromic acid salt sensitized emulsions for photo-reactive stencils. This trio of developers would introduce photo-imaged stencils to the commercial screen printing industry, though the acceptance of this method would take many years. Commercial screen printing now uses sensitizers far safer and less toxic than bichromates. Currently, there are large selections of pre-sensitized and "user mixed" sensitized emulsion chemicals for creating photo-reactive stencils.

A group of artists who later formed the National Serigraph Society, including WPA artists Max Arthur Cohn, Anthony Velonis and Hyman Warsager, coined the word "serigraphy" in the 1930s to differentiate the artistic application of screen printing from the industrial use of the process. "Serigraphy" is a compound word formed from Latin: sēricum, lit. 'silk' and Ancient Greek: γράφειν, romanized: graphein, lit. 'to write, draw'.

Historians of the New York WPA poster shop give sole credit to Anthony Velonis for establishing silkscreen methods used there, a reputation bolstered by the publication of his 1937 booklet Technical Problems of the Artist: Technique of the Silkscreen Process. Guido Lengweiler has corrected this misunderstanding in his book, A History of Screen Printing, published in English in 2016. Outgrowths of these WPA poster shops, at least two New York City studios in wartime started decorating ceramic tiles with fire-on underglaze applied by silkscreen starting as early as 1939: Harold Ambellan's workshop called Designed Tiles and Esteban Soriano's solo studio.

The Printers' National Environmental Assistance Center says, "Screenprinting is arguably the most versatile of all printing processes. Since rudimentary screenprinting materials are so affordable and readily available, it has been used frequently in underground settings and subcultures, and the non-professional look of such DIY culture screenprints have become a significant cultural aesthetic seen on movie posters, record album covers, flyers, shirts, commercial fonts in advertising, in artwork and elsewhere.

=== 1960s to present ===
Video of Silk Screening process for decal paper to be pasted on the ceramic wares

Credit is given to the artist Andy Warhol for popularising screen printing as an artistic technique. Warhol's silk screens include his 1962 Marilyn Diptych, which is a portrait of the actress Marilyn Monroe printed in bold colours. Warhol was supported in his production by master screen printer Michel Caza, a founding member of Fespa.

Robert Rauschenberg began silkscreening in 1962 after visiting Warhol's studio and seeing the paintings he was making with the process. Between October 1962 and June 1964 Rauschenberg used some fifty screens across numerous works, moving in 1963 from a largely black-and-white palette to bright colour.

In Britain the medium was taken up through Kelpra Studio in London, where the printer Chris Prater worked with artists including Eduardo Paolozzi. Paolozzi's portfolio As Is When (1965), twelve prints on the ideas of Ludwig Wittgenstein, was his most ambitious use of the process; the art historian Alex Potts has written that Prater's involvement made the series "into something of a collaborative effort".

Sister Mary Corita Kent gained international fame for her vibrant serigraphs during the 1960s and 1970s. Her works were rainbow coloured, contained words that were both political, and fostered peace and love and caring.

American entrepreneur, artist and inventor Michael Vasilantone started to use, develop, and sell a rotatable multicolour garment screen printing machine in 1960. Vasilantone later filed for a patent on his invention in 1967 granted number 3,427,964 on 18 February 1969. The original machine was manufactured to print logos and team information on bowling garments, but was soon directed to the new fad of printing on T-shirts. The Vasilantone patent was licensed by multiple manufacturers and the resulting production and boom in printed T-shirts made this garment screen printing machine popular. Screen printing on garments currently accounts for over half of the screen printing activity in the United States.

Graphic screen-printing is widely used today to create mass- or large-batch produced graphics, such as posters or display stands. Full colour prints can be created by printing in CMYK (cyan, magenta, yellow and black).

Screen printing lends itself well to printing on canvas. Andy Warhol, Arthur Okamura, Robert Rauschenberg, Roy Lichtenstein, Harry Gottlieb and many other artists have used screen printing as an expression of creativity and artistic vision.

Another variation, digital hybrid screen printing, is a union between analog screen printing and traditional digital direct-to-garment printing, two of the most common textile embellishment technologies in use today. Essentially, digital hybrid screen printing is an automatic screen-printing press with a CMYK digital enhancement located on one of the screen print stations. Digital hybrid screen printing is capable of variable data options, creating endless customizations, with the added ability of screen print specific techniques.

== Method ==
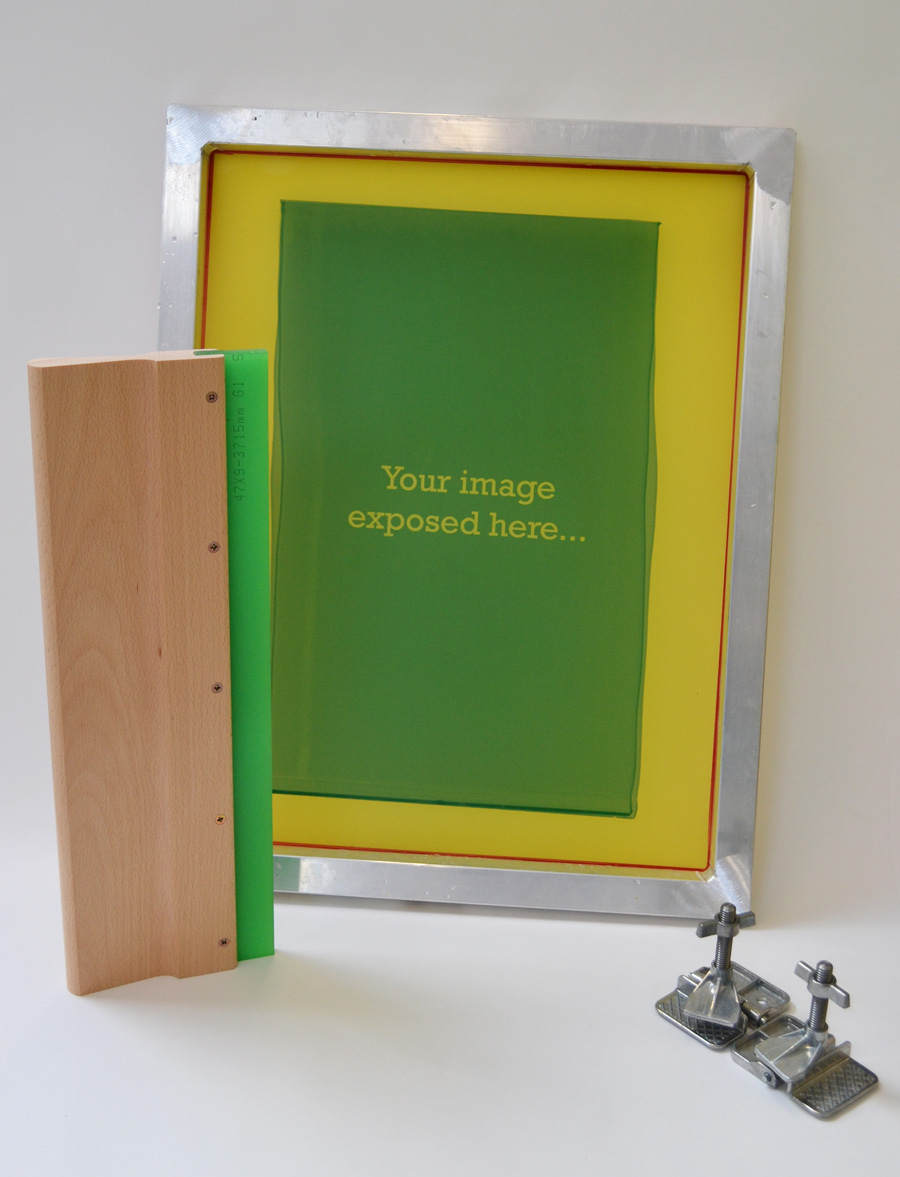
Screen printers use a silkscreen, a squeegee, and hinge clamps to screen print their designs. The ink is forced through the mesh using the rubber squeegee, the hinge clamps keep the screen in place for easy registration.

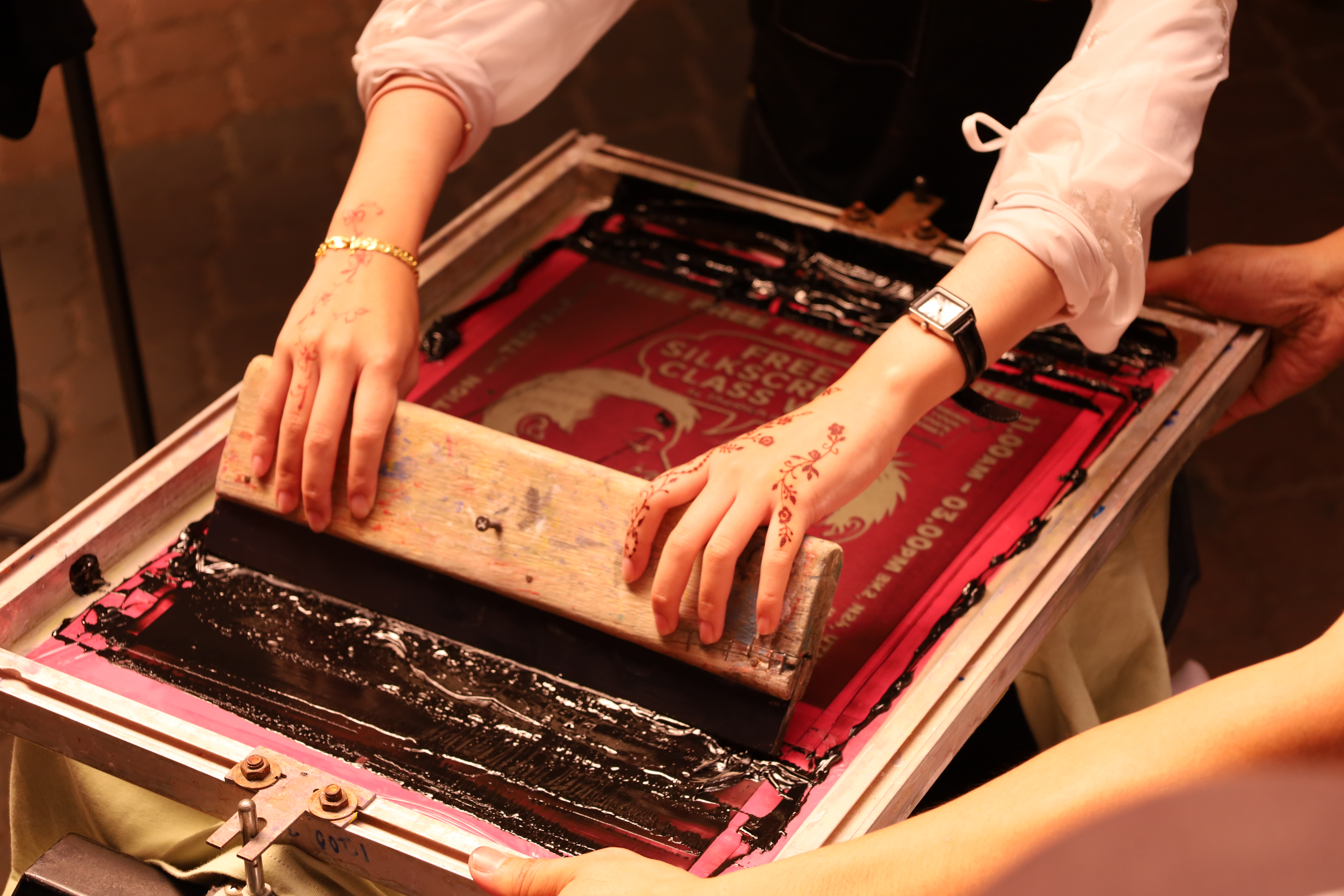
A silkscreen printer pulling the squeegee to create a design as a demonstration of the process.

A. Ink. B. Squeegee. C. Image. D. Photo-emulsion. E. Screen. F. Printed image

Different samples of the printed image

A screen is made of a piece of mesh stretched over a frame. The mesh could be made of a synthetic polymer, such as nylon, and a finer and smaller aperture for the mesh would be utilized for a design that requires a higher and more delicate degree of detail. For the mesh to be effective, it must be mounted on a frame and it must be under tension. The frame which holds the mesh could be made of diverse materials, such as wood, metal, or aluminum, depending on the sophistication of the machine or the artisan procedure. The tension of the mesh may be checked by using a tensiometer; a common unit for the measurement of the tension of the mesh is Newton per centimeter (N/cm).

A stencil is formed by blocking off parts of the screen in the negative image of the design to be printed; that is, the open spaces are where the ink will appear on the substrate.

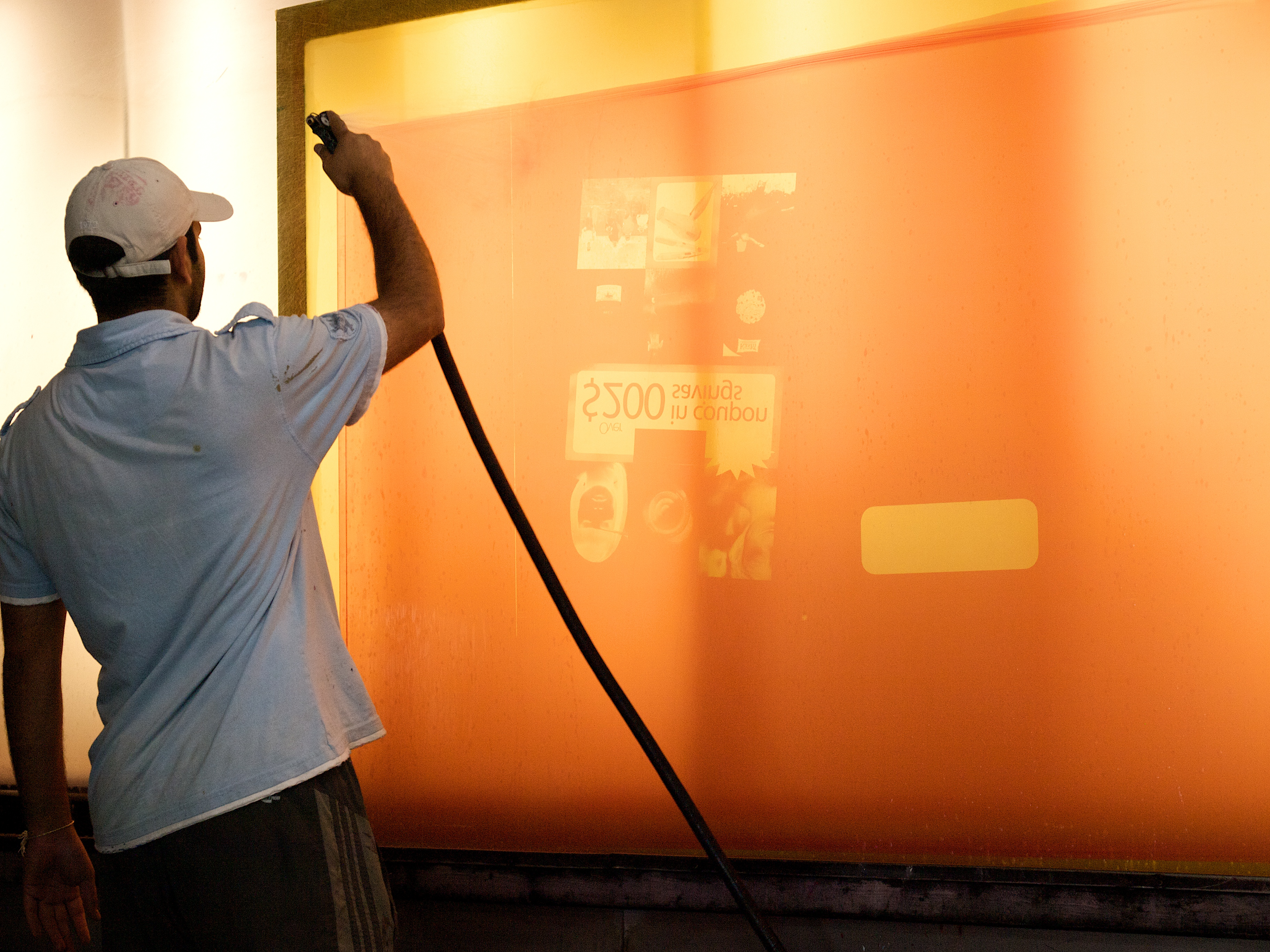
Process of washing out the uncured emulsion to have the positive of the design left on the screen

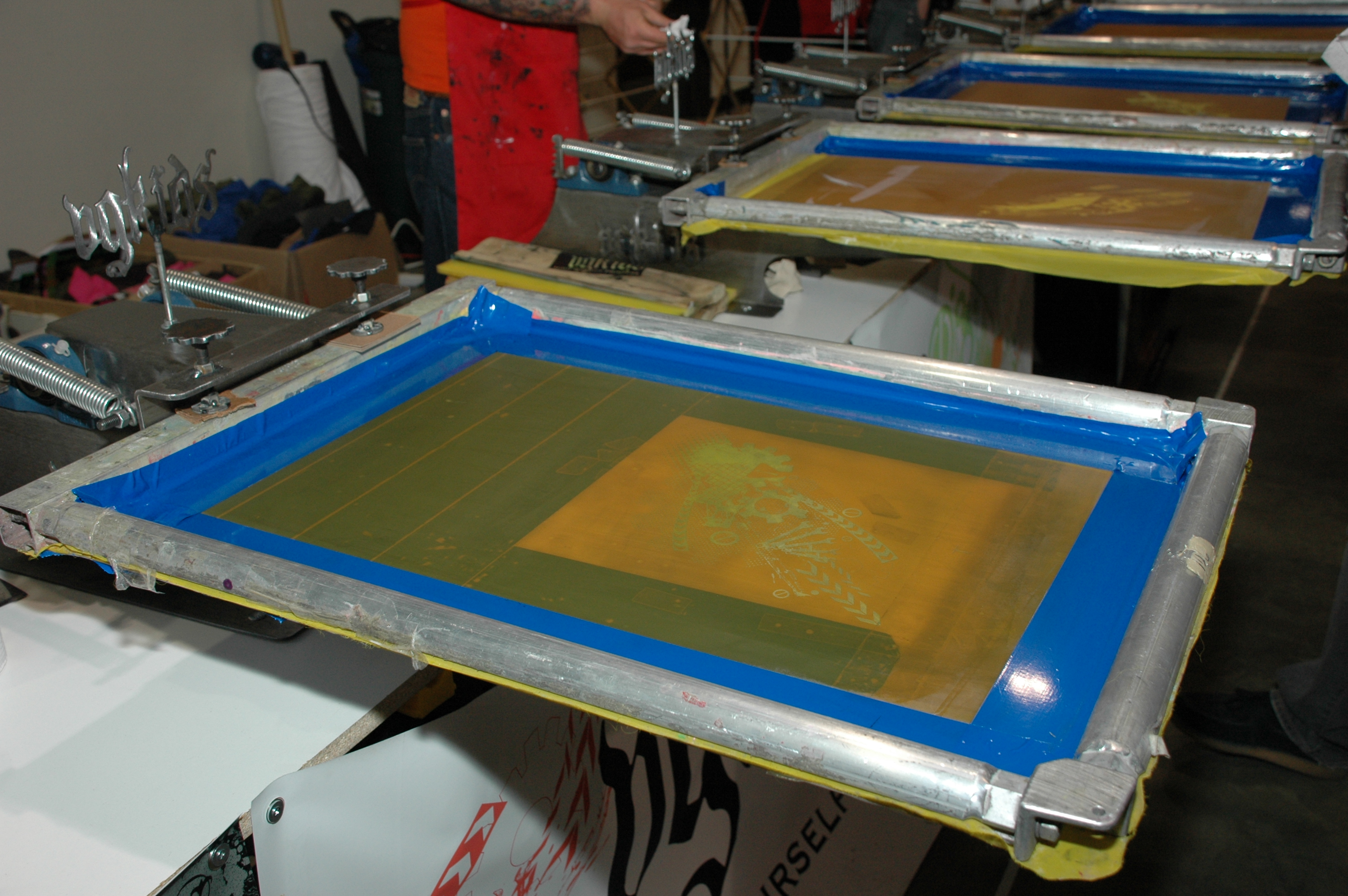
Screen with exposed image ready to be printed

Before printing occurs, the frame and screen must undergo the pre-press process, in which an emulsion is 'scooped' across the mesh. Once this emulsion has dried, it is selectively exposed to ultra-violet light, through a film printed with the required design. This hardens the emulsion in the exposed areas but leaves the unexposed parts soft. They are then washed away using a water spray, leaving behind a clean area in the mesh with the identical shape as the desired image, which will allow passage of ink. It is a positive process.

In fabric printing, the surface supporting the fabric to be printed (commonly referred to as a pallet) is coated with a wide 'pallet tape'. This serves to protect the 'pallet' from any unwanted ink leaking through the screen and potentially staining the 'pallet' or transferring unwanted ink onto the next substrate. The pallet tape is also used to protect the pallet from the usage of glue that keeps the substrate adhered and in place on the pallet. Over time the pallet tape will become covered with lint which it then can be removed, discarded, and replaced by new pallet tape.

Next, the screen and frame are lined with a tape to prevent ink from reaching the edge of the screen and the frame. The type of tape used in for this purpose often depends upon the ink that is to be printed onto the substrate. More aggressive tapes are generally used for UV and water-based inks due to the inks' lower viscosities and greater tendency to creep underneath tape.

The last process in the 'pre-press' is blocking out any unwanted 'pin-holes' in the emulsion. If these holes are left in the emulsion, the ink will continue through and leave unwanted marks. To block out these holes, materials such as tapes, speciality emulsions and 'block-out pens' may be used effectively.

How to screen print one image

How to screen print with multiple layers using CMYK

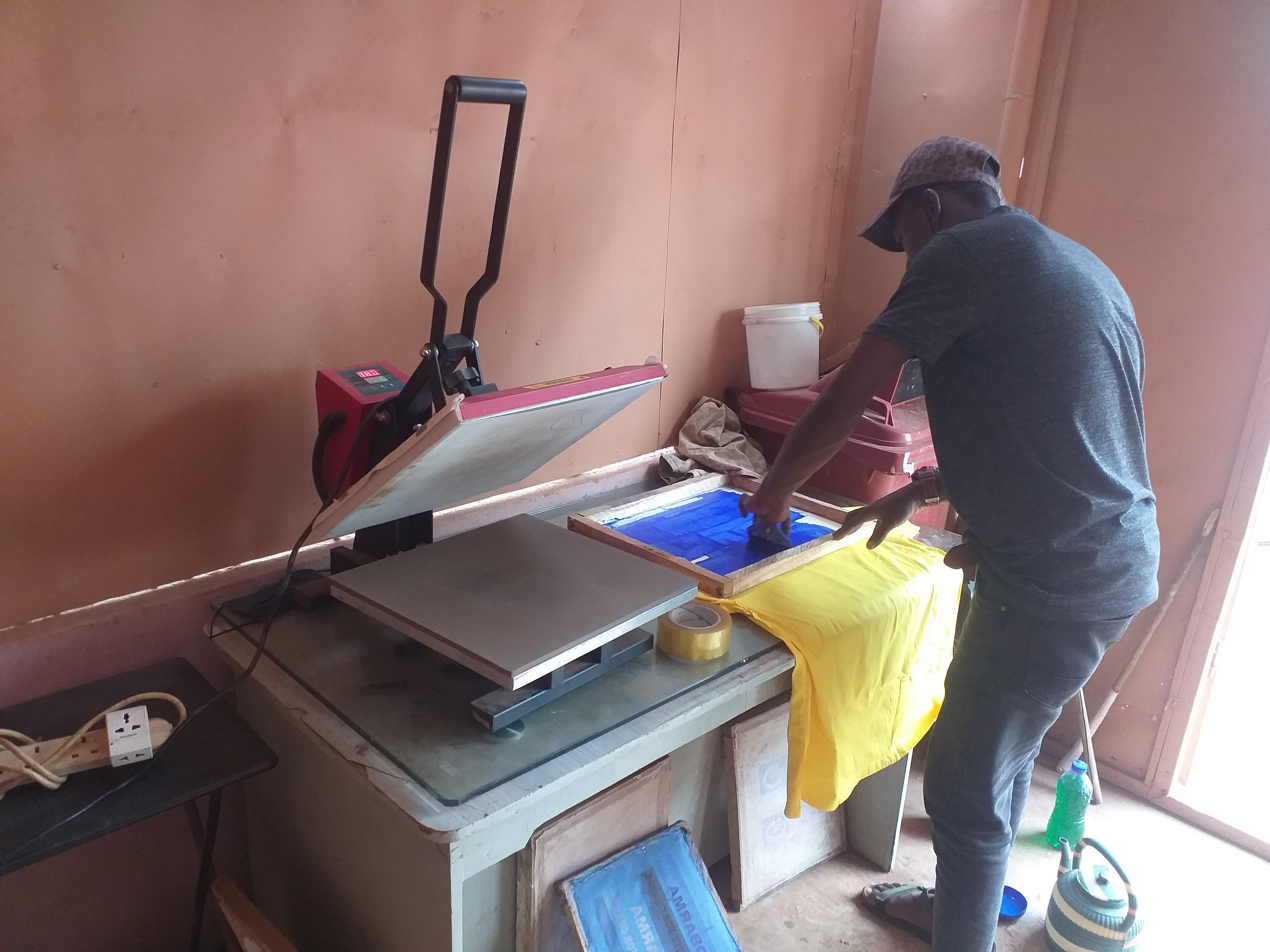
A graphic designer transferring an impression on to a shirt with a silkscreen and heat press

The screen is placed atop a substrate. Ink is placed on top of the screen, and a floodbar is used to push the ink through the holes in the mesh. The operator begins with the fill bar at the rear of the screen and behind a reservoir of ink. The operator lifts the screen to prevent contact with the substrate and then using a slight amount of downward force pulls the fill bar to the front of the screen. This effectively fills the mesh openings with ink and moves the ink reservoir to the front of the screen. The operator then uses a squeegee (rubber blade) to move the mesh down to the substrate and pushes the squeegee to the rear of the screen. The ink that is in the mesh opening is pumped or squeezed by capillary action to the substrate in a controlled and prescribed amount, i.e. the wet ink deposit is proportional to the thickness of the mesh and or stencil. As the squeegee moves toward the rear of the screen the tension of the mesh pulls the mesh up away from the substrate (called snap-off) leaving the ink upon the substrate surface.

There are three common types of screen printing presses: flat-bed, cylinder, and rotary. A development of screen printing with flat screens from 1963 was to wrap the screen around to form a tube, with the ink supply and squeegee inside the tube. The resulting roller rotates at the same speed as the web in a roll-to-roll machine. The benefits are high output rates and long rolls of product. This is the only way to make high-build fully patterned printing/coating as a continuous process, and has been widely used for manufacturing textured wallpapers.

Textile items printed with multi-coloured designs often use a wet on wet technique, or colours dried while on the press, while graphic items are allowed to dry between colours that are then printed with another screen and often in a different colour after the product is re-aligned on the press.

Most screens are ready for re-coating at this stage, but sometimes screens will have to undergo a further step in the reclaiming process called de-hazing. This additional step removes haze or "ghost images" left behind in the screen once the emulsion has been removed. Ghost images tend to faintly outline the open areas of previous stencils, hence the name. They are the result of ink residue trapped in the mesh, often in the knuckles of the mesh (the points where threads cross). A properly cleaned screen will not have any residual traces of the previous image apparent on its surface.

== Stencils ==
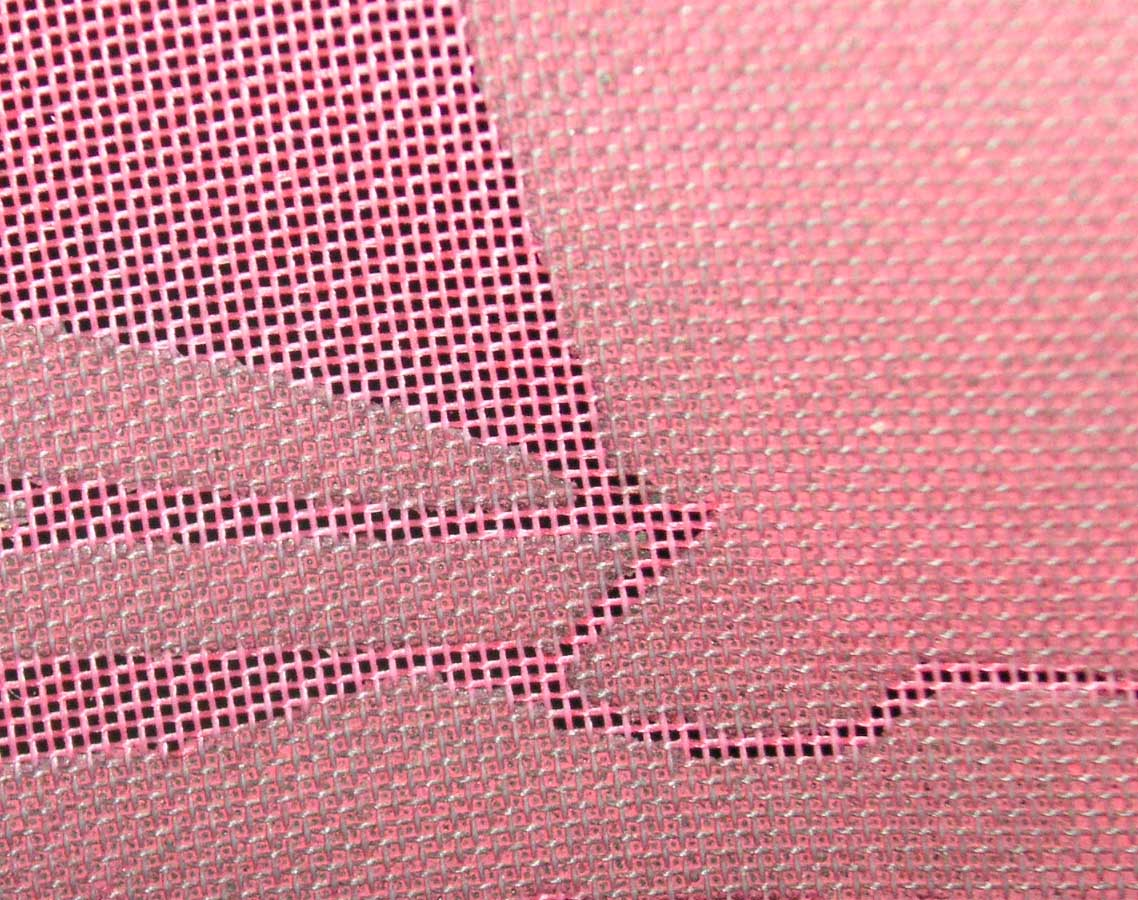
A macro photo of a screen print with a photographically produced stencil. The ink will be printed where the stencil does not cover the substrate.

A method of stenciling that has increased in popularity over the past years is the photo emulsion technique:

1. The original image is created on a transparent overlay, and the image may be drawn or painted directly on the overlay, photocopied, or printed with a computer printer, but making sure that the areas to be inked are not transparent. Any material that blocks ultra violet light can be used as the film, even card stock. A black-and-white positive may also be used (projected onto the screen). However, unlike traditional plate-making, these screens are normally exposed by using film positives.
2. A screen must then be selected. There are several different mesh counts that can be used depending on the detail of the design being printed. Once a screen is selected, the screen must be coated with a photosensitive emulsion and dried. Once dry, it is then possible to burn/expose the print.
3. The overlay is placed over the screen, and then exposed with a light source containing ultraviolet light in the 350–420 nanometer spectrum.
4. The screen is washed off thoroughly. The areas of emulsion that were not exposed to light dissolve and wash away, leaving a negative stencil of the image on the mesh.

== Garment printing inks ==
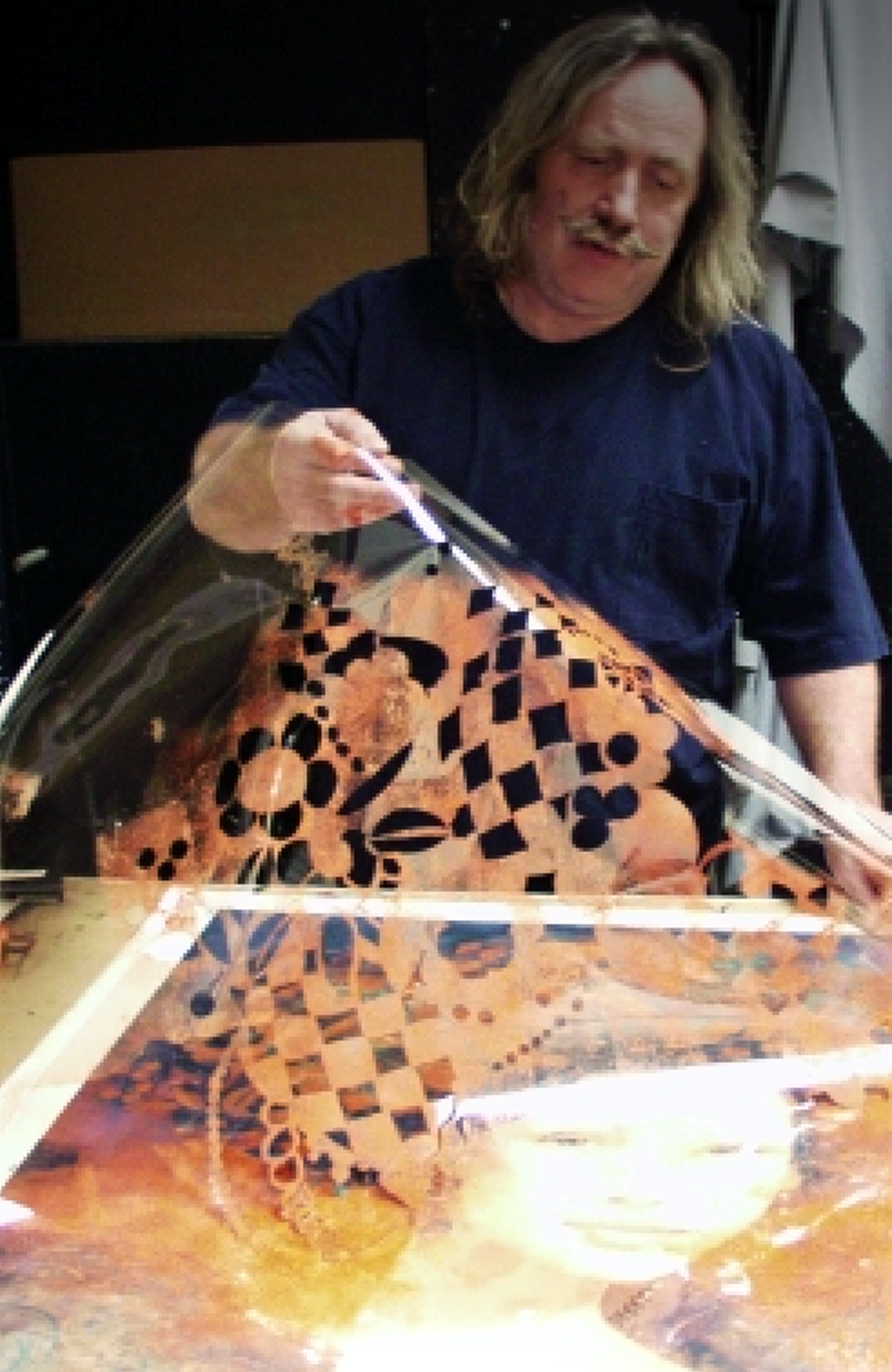
Hand-painted colour separation on transparent overlay by serigraph printer Csaba Markus

Caviar beads
A caviar bead is a glue that is printed in the shape of the design, to which small plastic beads are then applied – works well with solid block areas creating an interesting tactile surface.
Cracking ink
Ink may be so applied as to produce a cracked surface after drying. Similar cracking may occur unintentionally if the ink does not cure fully.
Discharge inks
Discharge inks use zinc formaldehyde sulfoxylate (the zinc analogue of Rongalite) to remove, or discharge, the dye back off the fabric. Cons of using discharge inks are that the process only works properly on dark fabrics that have a content of 100% cotton. Fabrics with under-dyes and fabric blends will discharge their dye to different degrees. The fumes resulting from the application and curing are pungent and strong ventilation and a face mask are commonly needed to relieve exposure. Pros to this process is that discharge is especially effective for distressed prints and under-basing on dark garments that are to be printed with additional layers of plastisol. It adds variety to the design and gives it that natural soft feel.
Expanding ink (puff)
Expanding ink, or puff, is an additive to plastisol inks which raises the print off the garment, creating a 3D feel and look to the design. Mostly used when printing on apparel.
Flocking
Flocking consists of a glue printed onto the fabric and then flock material is applied for a velvet touch.
Foil
Foil is much like flock, starting with an adhesive glue or plastisol ink base layer. Foil is finished by applying a thin sheet of reflective/mirror like material on top of the screened base, then heat pressed to set. The foil substrate does not adhere to non-screened areas of the design, and the balance of the foil sheet is discarded.
Four-colour process or the CMYK colour model
Four-colour process is when the artwork is created and then separated into four colours (CMYK) which combine to create the full spectrum of colours needed for photographic prints. This means a large number of colours can be simulated using only 4 screens, reducing costs, time, and set-up. This process utilises halftones. The inks are required to blend and are more translucent, meaning a compromise with vibrancy of colour.
Glitter/shimmer
Glitter or shimmer ink is when metallic flakes become an additive in the ink base to create this sparkle effect. Usually available in gold or silver but can be mixed to make most colours.
Gloss
Gloss ink is when a clear base laid over previously printed inks to create a shiny finish.
Metallic
Metallic ink is similar to glitter, but smaller particles suspended in the ink. A glue is printed onto the fabric, then nano-scale fibers applied on it. This is often purchased already made.
Mirrored Ink
Mirrored silver and gold are highly reflective, solvent-based inks. Mirrored inks can be prone to tarnishing over time.
Nylobond
Nylobond is a special ink additive for printing onto technical or waterproof fabrics.
Plastisol
Plastisol is the most common ink used in commercial garment decoration. Good colour opacity onto dark garments and clear graphic detail with, as the name suggests, a more plasticized texture. This print can be made softer with special additives or heavier by adding extra layers of ink. Plastisol inks require heat (approx. 150 °C (300 °F) for many inks) to cure the print, except in the case of low cure inks.
PVC and phthalate free
PVC and phthalate free is a relatively new breed of ink and printing with the benefits of plastisol but without the two main toxic components. It also has a soft texture and is being produced by most major suppliers.
Suede ink
Suede ink is a milky coloured additive that is added to plastisol. With suede additive you can make any colour of plastisol have a suede feel. It is actually a puff blowing agent that does not bubble as much as regular puff ink. The directions vary from manufacturer to manufacturer, but generally up to 50% suede can be added to normal plastisol.
Water-based inks
Water-based inks use water as their primary carrier and can produce prints with a soft feel because the ink can penetrate the fabric rather than forming a thick layer on its surface. Their suitability depends on the fabric, ink formulation and desired result. Conventional water-based inks are often used on light-coloured cotton, while high-opacity formulations are available for darker fabrics. During printing, these inks can dry in the screen if moisture is not managed, and the printed ink must be dried or cured according to the manufacturer's specifications.
Water-based dye (ink)
As opposed to a thicker plastisol ink, this dye arrives as a concentrate which is mixed into a printing paste (thickener) to allow screen printing, this process is best used on light garments and as the dye is in the fibers themselves is often used for dish cloths, napkins and the like. This is similar to traditional textile printing.
High density
High density is a process which uses a type of varnish against a lower mesh count with many coats of emulsion or a thicker grade of emulsion (e.g., Capillex). After the varnish passes through to the substrate, an embossed-appearing, 'raised' area of varnish is created. When cured at the end of the process, the varnish yields a Braille effect, hence the term 'high density'.

== Non-garment uses ==
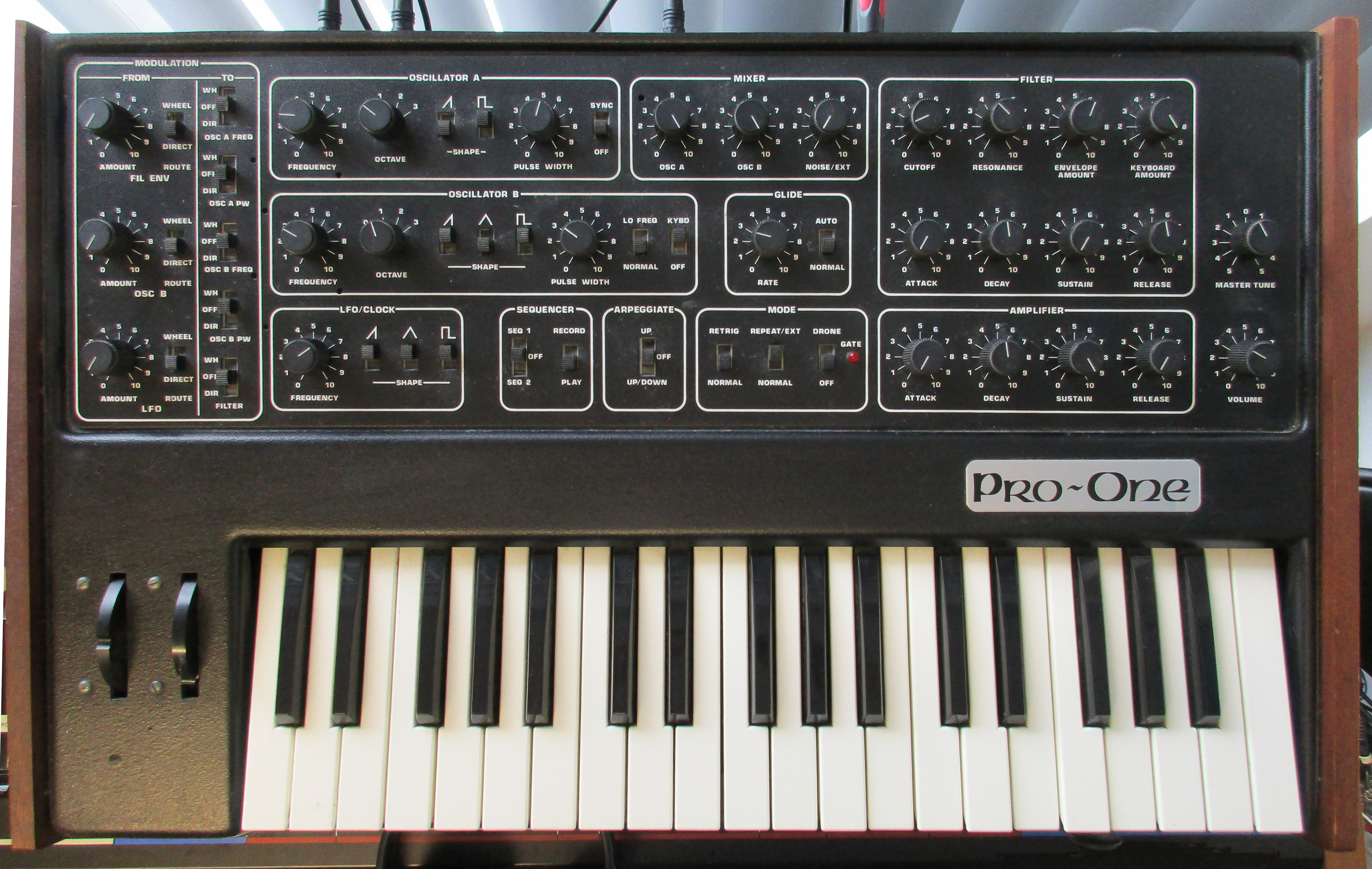
The Sequential Circuits Pro-One synthesizer with a screen printed control panel.

Screen printing is more versatile than traditional printing techniques. The surface does not have to be printed under pressure, unlike etching or lithography, and it does not have to be planar. Different inks can be used to work with a variety of materials, such as textiles, ceramics, wood, paper, glass, metal, and plastic. As a result, screen printing is used in many different industries, including:

- Balloons
- Clothing
- Decals
- Medical devices
- Printed electronics, including circuit board printing
- Product labels
- Snowboard graphics
- Textile fabric
- Thick film technology
- Pinball machines
- Drinkware
- the black bands around some tempered automotive glass

In screen printing on wafer-based solar photovoltaic (PV) cells, the mesh and buses of silver are printed on the front; furthermore, the buses of silver are printed on the back. Subsequently, aluminum paste is dispensed over the whole surface of the back for passivation and surface reflection. One of the parameters that can vary and can be controlled in screen printing is the thickness of the print. This makes it useful for some of the techniques of printing solar cells, electronics etc.

Solar wafers are becoming thinner and larger, so careful printing is required to maintain a lower breakage rate, though high throughput at the printing stage improves the throughput of the whole cell production line.

== Automation ==
To print multiple copies of the screen design on garments in an efficient manner, amateur and professional printers usually use a screen printing press, which is a colloquial term as most screen printing machines are vastly different from offset printing presses. Many companies offer simple to sophisticated printing presses. These presses come in one of three types, manual (also referred to as handbench), semi-automatic, and fully automatic. Most printing companies will use one or more semi-automatic or fully automatic machines with manual machines for small runs and sampling.

Whilst manual screen printing can be done with carousels, handbenches (both of which are often referred to colloquially as presses) or even on to tables. Semi- and fully-automatic machines are broken into two main categories; flatbed printers (poster, art printing or other flat substrates) and carousels and oval machines (garments and other apparel, amongst other textiles). Both which are fundamentally similar in terms of automation but differ in areas such as physical footprint and upgrade paths.

These machines are much faster and use either pneumatic pressure generated by air compressors or use electric motors to draw the squeegees, rotate and raise or lower pallets removing much of the manual labour from the task and use UV for instant image curing - resulting in significant reductions in operator fatigue as well as more consistent results.

== Printed circuit boards (PCB) ==
In electronic design automation, the silk screen is part of the layer stack of the printed circuit board (PCB), and the top and bottom sides are described in individual Gerber files like any other layers (such as the copper and solder-stop layers). Typical names for these service print overlays include tSilk/bSilk aka PLC/PLS (Note: The letters 'C' and 'S' in EAGLE's old Gerber filename extensions .PLC/.PLS for the top and bottom silk screens have their origin in times when printed circuit boards were typically equipped with components populated on one side of the board only, the so called "component side" (top) versus the opposite "solder side" (bottom) where these components were soldered (at least in the case of through-hole components). Each silk screen layer is often a combination of the corresponding Place and Names layers (and the Dimension layer), thus the 'PL' in the filename extension.) or TSK/BSK (EAGLE), F.SilkS/B.SilkS (KiCad), PosiTop/PosiBot (TARGET), silkTop/silkBottom (Fritzing), SST/SSB (OrCAD), ST.PHO/SB.PHO (PADS), SEVS/SERS (WEdirekt) or GTO/GBO (Gerber and many others).

== Printed electronics ==
Screen printing, a widely adopted technique in the printing industry, has found its niche in the realm of printed electronics. Its versatility and ability to deposit thick layers of inks make it ideal for creating conductive tracks, sensors, and other electronic components. Furthermore, screen printing offers advantages such as high throughput, low production costs, and compatibility with a wide range of substrates, including flexible materials. These attributes make it a preferred choice for large-scale production of printed electronic devices.

While screen printing offers great potential in printed electronics, it also faces certain challenges. Fine-line resolution, compatibility with advanced materials, and the need for precise registration pose ongoing research and development opportunities. However, continuous advancements in ink formulations, equipment, and process optimization are paving the way for exciting future possibilities, including the integration of printed electronics into Internet of Things (IoT) devices, energy harvesting systems, and more.

== See also ==
- Batik
- Gocco
- Ink jet
- Printed electronics
- Flamingo Inks
