= Catherine Yarrow =

English artist

- Born: 27 June 1904; Harpenden, Hertfordshire, England
- Died: 14 November 1990 (aged 86); London, England
- Education: Royal Academy of Dramatic Art
- Known for: Printmaking, Ceramics
- Movement: Surrealism
- Website: http://www.catherineyarrow.com/#

Catherine Yarrow (27 June 1904 — 14 November 1990) was an English artist known for printmaking, painting, ceramics and pottery in a surrealist mode. She studied at the Royal Academy of Dramatic Art, graduating in 1925. The art historian Patricia Allmer has described her as 'one of the international figures of surrealism and its developments in the 1940s.'

== Career ==
Reacting against what she saw as the conformity of life in Britain, between World War I and World War II Yarrow lived, worked and exhibited in Paris. During her time in Paris, Yarrow associated with many surrealist artists, including Leonora Carrington, Isamu Noguchi, Marcel Duchamp and Max Ernst. Her entry into this milieu was provided by an early acquaintance with the poet Pierre Reverdy. She also formed an important relationship with Alberto Giacometti. Yarrow studied etching at Atelier 17, a workshop established in Paris by Stanley William Hayter, an English printmaker, in 1929. This resulted in a number of prints characterized by surrealist and biomorphic forms. In the 1930s, Yarrow was also apprenticed to the potter Josep Llorens i Artigas. Yarrow later discussed the importance of pottery in the development of her career: 'It wasn't until I came to the pottery that I had any craft. And that's why it was extremely important for me in the early thirties. [...] It absolutely changed by life - this pottery, this occupation and the craft.' In the 1930s Yarrow suffered an emotional breakdown and spent time in Switzerland, where she met Carl Jung, and entered a clinic in Morges where she underwent analysis. Yarrow's experience of undergoing Jungian therapy resulted in a series of watercolours, many of which feature menacing, brightly coloured geometric personages, and some of which specifically reference Morges in their titles. She used art as a way to cope with her anxiety, creating pieces with somber tones that reflected how she felt.

Together with many other Surrealist artists fleeing the war, in 1940 Yarrow moved to New York, where she lived until 1948. Yarrow's move to New York was prompted in part by Hayter's relocation of Atelier 17 to the city in 1940, and she continued to associate there with surrealists in exile such as Ernst, Carrington and André Breton. In New York, Yarrow's straightened financial circumstances prompted her to start experimenting with making leather goods; these enabled her to make a living. As well, she worked with New York ceramist Carol Janeway who sold to Georg Jensen Inc. (New York, NY) and is proposed to have built Janeway's kiln at the 46 East 8th Street studio, across from Hayter's Atelier 17. During this period, Yarrow became an acquaintance of the artist Louise Bourgeois. In an interview with Hans Ulrich Obrist, Bourgeois noted that the title of her sculpture Portrait of C.Y. (c. 1947–49), made of painted wood and nails, was a reference to Yarrow. After her years in New York, Yarrow returned to Britain, where she focused increasingly on ceramics and pottery, establishing a workshop/studio that included an oil-fired kiln in the garden of her mews cottage in St John's Wood. Her pottery was considered to be experimental, both visible in her ceramic sculptures as well as her pottery which had themes of simple shapes, symbols, and balance throughout her pieces. With fellow St John's Wood resident Buntie Wills, a Jungian therapist, Yarrow undertook further Jungian analysis. The 1950s and 1960s saw her experience a period of creativity, producing a diverse array of work in using mono print and pastels, as well as mixed materials such as sand. Associates during this later period of her career included the potter, founder and co-editor of the magazine Ceramic Review Eileen Lewenstein. From the mid-1960s onwards, Yarrow also took up painting. During the 1960s, Cecile Elstein, the artist, was her studio pupil.

== Exhibition history ==
While in America, Yarrow's ceramics were exhibited at the Julien Levy Gallery in 1943, together with drawings by Ernst. In 1943, her work featured in The Women's Exhibition organised by Peggy Guggenheim at her Art of this Century gallery, New York, a follow-up to the Exhibition by 31 Women at the beginning of the year. In 1944 Yarrow was included in the exhibition New Directions in Gravure: Hayter and Studio 17 at the Museum of Modern Art, New York, which traveled for two years across the United States. In 1950 Yarrow had an exhibition at the Hanover Gallery in London. During the 1960s she exhibited her ceramics together with artists including Bernard Leach and Lucie Rie at the Marjorie Parr Gallery, London. In 2012 an exhibition of her prints, drawings and watercolours at Austin Desmond Gallery, London, attracted serious interest from collectors. In 2017, a pen and ink drawing by Yarrow was included in the exhibition 31 Women by Breese Little gallery, an homage to Guggenheim's 1943 exhibition of women surrealists. In 2018, Yarrow's ceramics featured in the Collect 2018 exhibition Masters of Studio Pottery, co-curated by the Crafts Council and the Fitzwilliam Museum, Cambridge. The same year, her watercolours were included in the exhibition Neolithic Childhood: Art in a False Present, c. 1930 at the Haus der Kulturen der Welt.

== Works in collections ==
- Blue House (Morges), 1935, Tate
- Head with Insect, 1935, Scottish National Gallery of Modern Art
- Not What I Want, 1935, Tate
- Four Heads, 1935, Tate
- Tower with Symbols, ca. 1960–65, Victoria & Albert Museum
- Bowl, ca. 1960–65, Victoria & Albert Museum
- Bird's Nest, ca. 1960–65, Victoria & Albert Museum
- Still Snowing, But Less, 1966, Kettle's Yard
- Yarrow's work can also be found in the Anthony Shaw Collection, which is on long-term loan to the Centre of Ceramic Art (CoCA) at York Art Gallery.
