= Sara Harris =

Sara E Harris
- Title: Professor of teaching
- Awards: 3M National Teaching Fellow, 2015

Academic background
- Education: Oregon State University
- Thesis: The Atlantic, the Amazon, and the Andes : neogene climate and tectonics viewed from Ceara Rise, western tropical Atlantic (1998)

Academic work
- Discipline: Science education, climate science, paleoclimate
- Institutions: Faculty of Science Department of Earth, Ocean & Atmospheric Sciences; The University of British Columbia
- Notable works: "Understanding Climate Change: Science, Policy and Practice" by Sarah Burch and Sara Harris, 2014. University of Toronto Press. Available here: http://www.utppublishing.com/Understanding-Climate-Change-Science-Policy-and-Practice.html
- Website: https://www.eoas.ubc.ca/about/faculty/S.Harris.html

Sara E Harris (born 1969) is a Canadian scientist, and professor in the department of Earth, Ocean, and Atmospheric Sciences, and the associate dean academic in the Faculty of Science at the University of British Columbia. In 2015, she was named a 3M National Teaching Fellow for her MOOC on climate change.

== Education ==
Sara Harris obtained her PhD in geological oceanography from the College of Oceanic and Atmospheric Sciences, Oregon State University in 1998.

== Career ==
From 1998 to 2005, she served as the chief scientist at the Sea Education Association in Woods Hole, Massachusetts. In this role, she would take students out to sea for six weeks to teach methodologies for collecting oceanographic data as well as navigation and sailing. She was a senior instructor at the University of British Columbia prior to becoming professor of teaching there. In that role, she studies evidence-based science education and how people learn climate science. In 2013, she co-taught a massive open online course called Climate Literacy: Navigating Climate Change Conversations, and later taught Climate Change: The Science on the edX platform.

=== Teaching ===
Harris has taught a number of courses at the University of British Columbia, including Introduction to Environmental Science, Research Project in Environmental Science, The Fluid Earth: Atmosphere and Ocean, and Global Climate Change.

== Bibliography ==
Burch, Sarah; Harris, Sara (2014-07-03). Understanding Climate Change: Science, Policy, and Practice University of Toronto Press, Scholarly Publishing Division. ISBN 9781442614451.
