= Jens Risom =

Danish-American furniture designer (1916–2016)

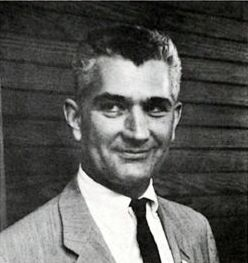
- Born: 8 May 1916; Copenhagen, Denmark
- Died: 9 December 2016 (aged 100); New Canaan, Connecticut, U.S.
- Education: The School of Arts and Crafts, Copenhagen
- Occupation: Industrial designer

Jens Risom (/ˈdʒɛns ˈriːsəm/ JENSS REE-səm; 8 May 1916 – 9 December 2016) was a Danish American furniture designer. An exemplar of Mid-Century modern design, Risom was one of the first designers to introduce Scandinavian design in the United States.

== Biography ==
Risom was born in Copenhagen, Denmark, on 8 May 1916. His father was a prominent architect, Sven Risom, a member of the school of Nordic Classicism. Risom was trained as a designer at the Copenhagen School of Industrial Arts and Design (Kunsthåndværkerskolen), where he studied under Ole Wanscher and Kaare Klint. He was classmates with Hans Wegner and Børge Mogensen.

Risom spent two years at Niels Brock Copenhagen Business College, before beginning work as a furniture developer and interior designer with the architectural firm of Ernst Kuhn. He later relocated to Stockholm, taking a job with a small architectural firm. From there he joined the design department of Nordiska Kompaniet where he was introduced to Alvar Aalto and Bruno Mathsson.

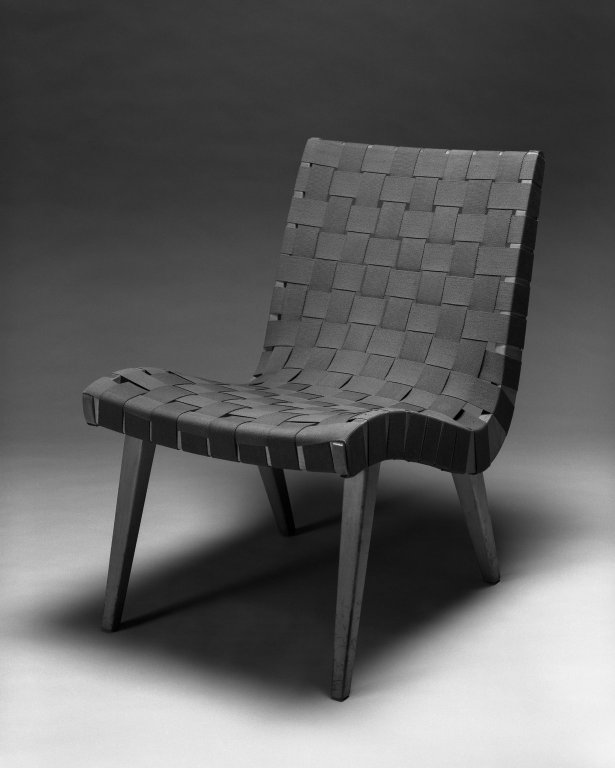
Lounge Chair, Model 654W. 1941

In 1939, Risom traveled to New York City to study American design. He found it difficult to find work as a furniture designer in New York, however, and was forced to accept a number of textile designs that ultimately secured him freelance work with designer Dan Cooper. This led to his work being included in the Collier's "House of Ideas" designed by Edward Durell Stone and constructed in front of Rockefeller Center during the 1939 New York World's Fair.

In 1941, Risom teamed with entrepreneur Hans Knoll and in 1942, they launched the Hans Knoll Furniture Company with 15 of the 20 pieces in the inaugural "600" line designed by Risom. These works included stools, armchairs and lounges, made from cedar and surplus webbing—works which have since become design classics. In 1941, Risom sold 21 furniture designs to Frederik Lunning Inc. who produced prototypes for Georg Jensen Inc. (New York, NY), launched as The Lunning Collection in October 1942.

With the advent of World War II, Risom was drafted into the United States Army in 1943 and served under General George S. Patton. After completing his military service, Risom briefly returned to Knoll in New York, but soon decided to launch his own firm, Jens Risom Design (JRD), which he launched on 1 May 1946.

Risom's reputation as a furniture designer continued to grow, and Risom began to promote Scandinavian design in home furniture to the broader American public. In the 1950s, JRD ran a series of ads featuring photography by Richard Avedon and the slogan "The Answer is Risom." The result of this success was that in 1954, JRD launched a major expansion of its production facilities. In the late 1950s, JRD shifted its focus away from home furnishings and towards office furniture, hospital furniture, and library furniture. In 1961, Risom was one of six furniture designers featured in a profile in Playboy magazine. One of Risom's executive office chairs became famous when Lyndon B. Johnson chose to use it in the Oval Office.

Risom sold JRD to Dictaphone in 1970, after having run the company for 25 years. Risom stayed on as CEO for 3 years, and then relocated from New York to New Canaan, Connecticut and launched a consulting service, Design Control.

Risom died at his home in New Canaan, Connecticut, at the age of 100.

== Honors ==
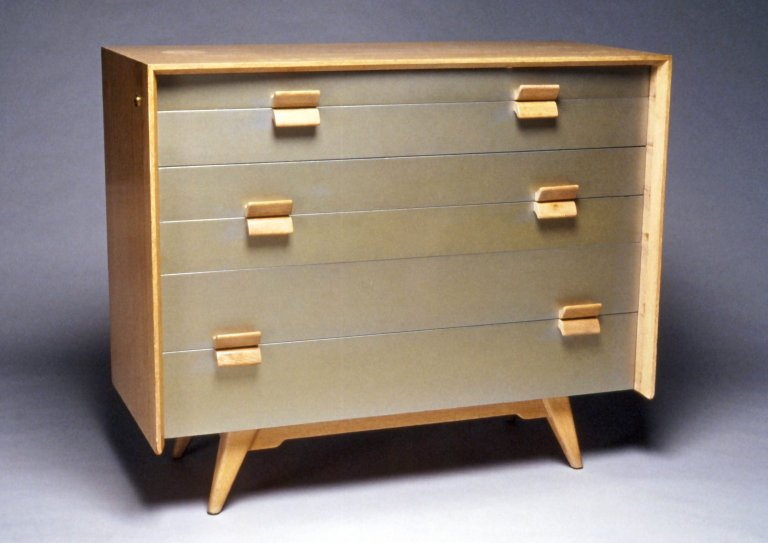
Jens Risom. Chest-of-Drawers, ca. 1955 Brooklyn Museum

Many of Risom's furniture designs are considered modern classics, and his furniture is on display at the Museum of Modern Art, the Yale University Art Gallery, the Brooklyn Museum, the Rhode Island School of Design Museum, and the Cooper–Hewitt, National Design Museum. In 1996, Risom was presented with the Danish Knight's Cross by Margrethe II of Denmark. Risom was a long-standing trustee of the Rhode Island School of Design.

== Modern revival ==
In 1997, Knoll reissued Risom's furniture designs from the 1940s and 1950s. Two London galleries—Rocket Gallery and Liberty Gallery—launched retrospectives of Risom's work in 2008.

Risom's revival in the United States was spearheaded by furniture company RALPH PUCCI which has been consistently working and showing Jens' work since 2001.

== See also ==
- List of centenarians (miscellaneous)
- Douglas Snelling
