= Designed Tiles =

Designed Tiles, a New York City silkscreen studio devoted to decorating and firing ceramic tiles, was established in 1941 by American artist and sculptor Harold Ambellan (1912-2006). In taped interviews of 2005 describing his entire artistic career, Ambellan recounted the beginnings of Designed Tiles. Ambellan operated Designed Tiles from 1941 to 1958 then sold it to Steven and Masha Sklansky who continued to produce decorated tiles until 1978.

== Artistic silkscreening and the New Deal ==
In the 1930s Depression, unemployed artists in New York City could be paid to train as silkscreen poster designers, stencil-makers, and printers, a program initially set up by New York Mayor Fiorello La Guardia then, in 1935, incorporated into President Franklin D. Roosevelt's Federal Arts Project (FAP) of the Works Progress Administration (WPA). Anthony Velonis is credited for introducing silkscreening to New York citing his 1937 booklet "Technical Problems of the Artist: Technique of the Silkscreen Process," circulated in the WPA shops.

The 1938 closing of the Federal Art Project released many newly unemployed artists like Ambellan and also a cadre of silkscreen poster designers, stencil-cutters, silkscreen stencil producers, printers, and so on.

In this artistic milieu, the sculptor Harold Ambellan had observed others silkscreening and privately experimented with silkscreening his designs on industrial porcelain tiles using colored underglaze paints and firing them.

== Establishing Designed Tiles ==
When the United States was cut off from European imports by the outbreak of World War II in 1939, he showed samples of his decorated tiles to a wrought-iron furniture maker, John Salterini, who could no longer access Spanish and Italian tiles for his tables. Salterini invested $1,000 in Ambellan's venture enabling them to buy a large kiln and to relocate to a second-story loft at 22 East 21st Street, in Manhattan's Flat Iron district, across the street from Harold and wife Elisabeth's top-floor apartment at 31 East 21st Street.

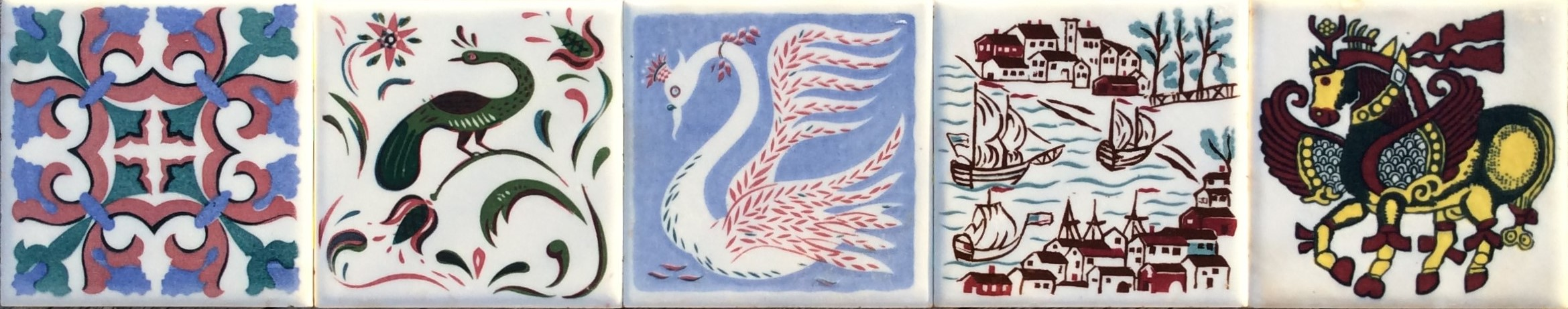
Designed Tiles studio's early designs of the 1940s. 6x6in. (Vanderlaan Tile catalog codes DH, DW, D19, DX)

Ambellan said that they started with five to eight employees, mostly artists, and later had eight to ten staff. By hiring a manager, Ambellan could return to his sculpting. Staff could be laid off, collect unemployment insurance while making their own art, then return to the studio for another stint.

The Ambellans invited friends to tile-painting parties. At least one such friend, Manhattanite Carol Janeway, embarked in late 1941 on a career of hand-decorating tiles in underglaze. The story of the Designed Tiles studio and its international staff was circulated nationwide in a 1946 news article syndicated by the Associated Press. By 1958 the studio's address was listed at 324 West 26th Street in the Industrial Directory of New York State.

== Tiles produced by Designed Tiles studio: 1941-1958 ==
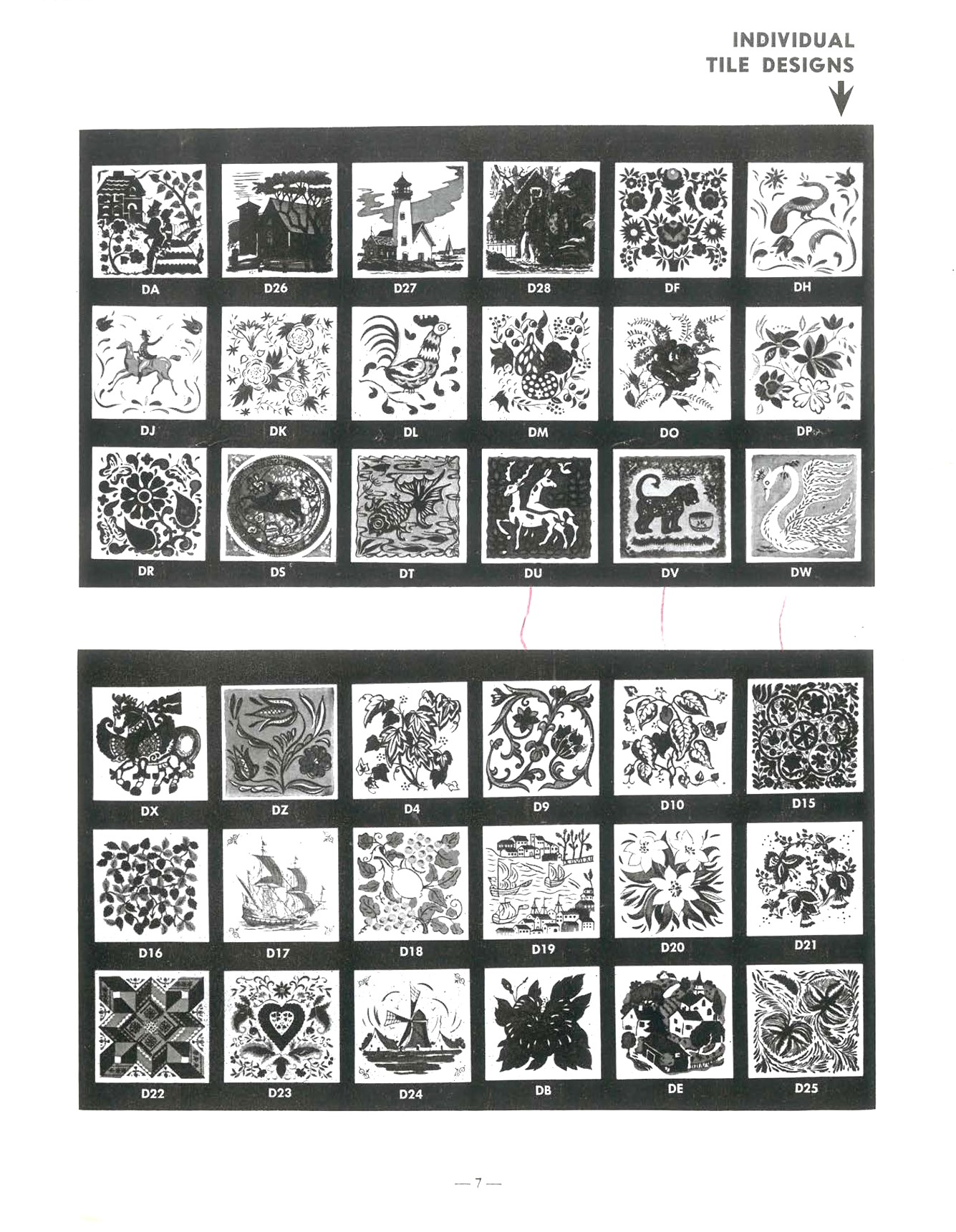
Designed Tiles studio tiles offered in 1952 Vanderlaan Tile Co. catalog

The designs were printed on 6x6 inch unglazed industrial porcelain blanks purchased directly from Wheeling Tile Co. The 3-4 color designs indicate that 3-4 silkscreens were used, the last screen supplying the black details atop the previously applied colors. The underglaze designs were further overglazed with a lead glaze formula, possibly all in a single firing. His earlier designs were symmetrical patterns and Spanish-looking, according to Ambellan, while they branched into flowers, New England and international scenes, other abstract patterns, and even a poem about drinking coffee. The studio's fired though-put was claimed in a 1946 news article as being 10,000 tiles a week. Ambellan himself provided many designs and two other designers’ put their signatures in the tiles’ stencils: textile designer and silkscreen specialist Ruth Reeves and primitive painter Tusnelda Sanders. Esteban Soriano, noted Puerto Rican illustrator, established his tile decorating business after collaborating with Designed Tiles. Two other designers known to have produced signed silkscreened tiles have been suggested as designers for Designed Tiles: textile designer Maxine Szanton (1911-1998), and her sister the illustrator Beatrice Szanton Tobey (1910- 1993). A description of the silkscreen technology of the period used to decorate these tiles is available.

== Identifying a tile by Designed Tiles ==
With the exceptions of Reeves’ two signed tiles and Tusnelda's one initialed tile, the tiles by Designed Tiles studio are neither signed nor is any logo imprinted on them indicating the studio's authorship. The Vanderlaan Tile Company's illustrated tile catalogs, published in the 1950s, enable trustworthy visual identification of tiles from Ambellan's Designed Tile studio, 1941-1958.

The Wheeling Tile Company embossed manufacture dates on the tiles’ backs dating, if not the design, then the creation of the tile itself.

== Merchandising tiles by Designed Tiles: 1941-1958 ==
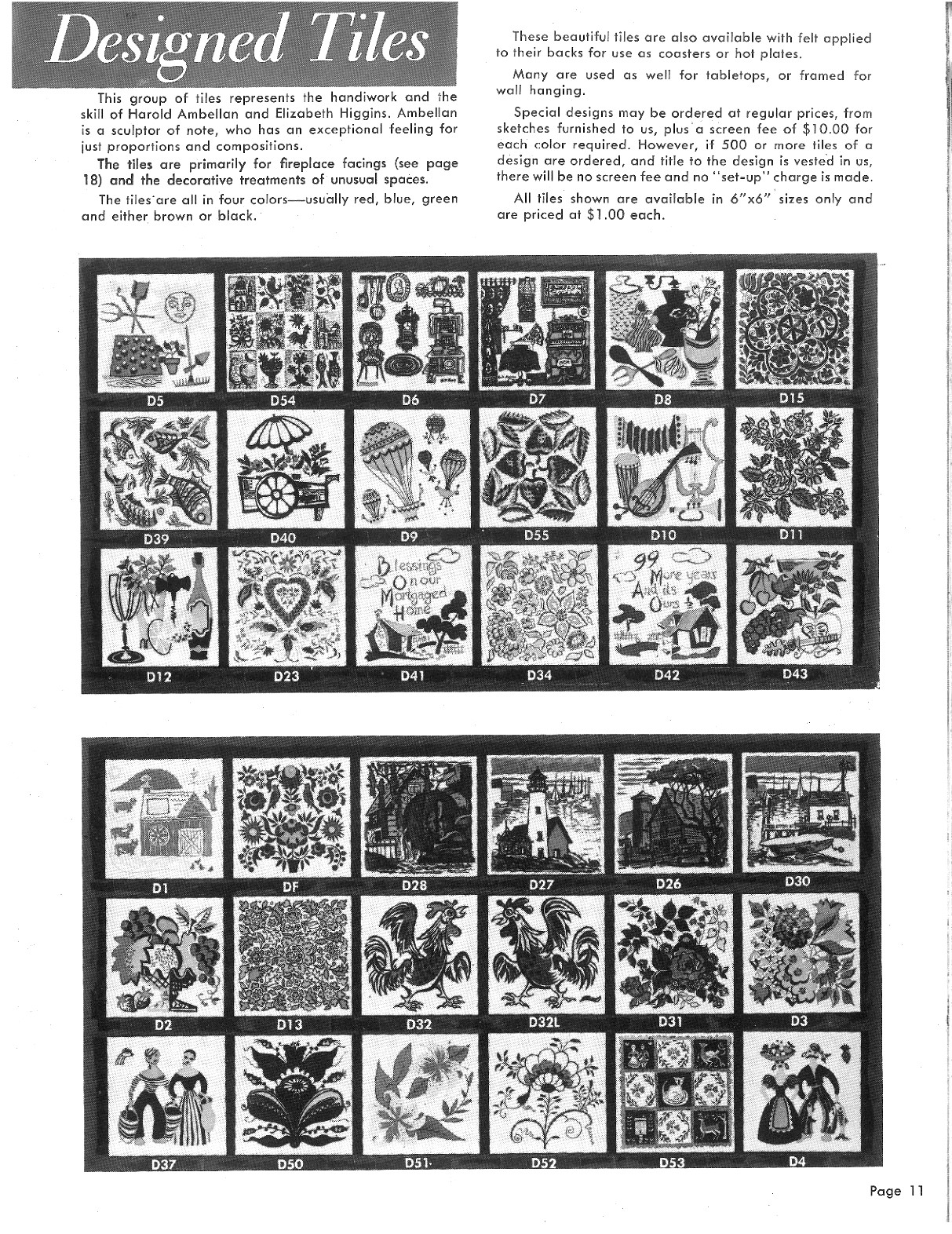
Designed Tiles studio's tiles depicted in 1958 Vanderlaan Tile Co. catalog, "Faience and Tiles,"11.

Designed Tiles’ tiles of the Ambellan studio were not sold directly to retailers, rather through two agencies identified so far: Edward Greeman Associates (220 Fifth Avenue) and Vanderlaan Tile Company (Park Avenue). Newspaper and magazine advertisements appear in the 1940s showing the tiles, called "designed tiles," offered by various retailers for $1 apiece. Two Vanderlaan catalogues, one from the early 1950s and one from the late 1950s, permit identification of tiles and also suggest their datability.

Designed Tiles did fill custom orders: either stencilled silkscreens made for ceramic art studios or the designing and printing of a custom tile order.

Certain companies incorporated known tiles by Designed Tiles into their products: examples are Cellini Argental trays, anonymous brass ashtrays and coasters, and in metal and wood furniture.

The success of Designed Tiles, a wartime start-up, inspired several other New York artists in the 1940s to set up silkscreen tile decorating studios: Esteban Soriano, Warner Prins, Ceramo Studios. Among veterans who had silkscreened for the US Army, the most noted artist to establish a studio after the war was Robert Darr Wert.

Late in life, Ambellan commented, “At any rate, we had a rather nice collection. It wasn't art but it wasn't the worst kind of commercial art...”

== Harold and Elisabeth Ambellan's personal lives ==
Elisabeth (Lis) Higgins and Harold were both part of New York's leftist scene of the 1930s. Harold was forming United American Sculptors, a division of United American Artists, a CIO affiliate. Lis Higgins had been a union organizer. When they married on May 4, 1940, their friend and long-time boarder Woody Guthrie sang It Takes a Married Man to Sing a Worried Song for their wedding song. Harold, also a folk singer, performed with Guthrie, Pete Seeger, and others in the early 1940s. A 1941 letter from Woodie Guthrie teasing them about “tile wrestling” substantiates that Designed Tiles was in operation by 1941. Lis Ambellan's main role at Designed Tiles became marketing, not the artistic end of the business.

Harold spent most of WWII in the US Navy. Their FBI records of the 1950s show that agents repeatedly investigated both Harold and Lis about their knowledge of Dr. Robert Soblen, a social friend who, unknown to them, was a Soviet spy.

== 1958:Designed Tiles studio is sold ==
The sale of Designed Tiles in 1958 was one of a concurrence of events. Both Harold and Lis, divorced since 1948, had retained an interest in the studio. Other pursuits called. With the sale of the studio, Lis would return to university, earn a PhD in biochemistry, and relocate to University of Connecticut. Harold was soured by the McCarthy Era and FBI harassment. With the sale of the studio he would permanently relocate in France and pursue his art career.

Designed Tiles’ major sales venue, Vanderlaan Tile Company, was being sold in 1958 to Herman Goldberg who continued the firm's name and, it appears, its tile lines. With the Wheeling Tile Company's 1958 downsizing, new tile blank providers needed to be located.

== Designed Tiles studio: 1958-1978 ==
In 1958, Designed Tiles was purchased by friends of the Ambellans, Steven and Masha Sklansky, whose studio was a 9th-floor loft at 714 Broadway near Cooper Union and NYU's Washington Square College. They operated for another 20 years concentrating on new single-tile designs, mostly in overglaze, often using imported transfers while sometimes reproducing the earlier Ambellan designs. These tiles are recognizable by the cork backings bearing the firm's new logo. For their overglaze application, they used pre-glazed tile blanks from various providers: Pilkington, Robertson, Richards. They often appear on the market today still packaged in their white cardboard window sheaths printed with Designed Tiles logo.

Nina Sklansky, the daughter, has provided names of staff and described studio practice. While no catalog featuring Designed Tiles has appeared originating in the 1958-1978 period, the Sklanskys continued the Ambellans’ model: sell to the trade, fill special orders, fabricate custom-stencilled screens for local ceramists, and run experiments to improve and broaden their offerings.

== Closure ==
The Sklansky family closed the Designed Tiles studio in 1978. Whether it was sold to a successor is unknown, as is the fate of the artistic repertory, the business records, and the clients.

== Bibliography ==
- Ambellan, Harold (2005). Harold Ambellan Memoir: Chapter 7: New York: End of the New Deal, Tile Business. www.credo.library.umass.edu. pp. 30–31.
- Jenssen, Victoria (2022. "Designed Tiles: A Silkscreen Studio in New York, NY, 1939-1978," Tile Heritage. Vol.XI, No.2, Summer 2022, pp. 21–37.
- Jenssen, Victoria (2022). "Chapter 15: Printing Janeway Designs on Ceramics," in The Art of Carol Janeway: A Tile & Ceramic Career with Georg Jensen Inc. and Ossip Zadkine in 1940s Manhattan. Friesen Press.

Jenssen, Victoria (2026). "Tile of Esteban Soriano and Soriano Ceramics Inc: New York City mid-20th century tile studios," Tile Heritage, Vol.XIII, No.1, Spring 2026, pp. 3–22.

- Kerr, Adelaide (October 18, 1946). "Tile Painting Aids Careers of Artists". Lancaster New Era. Lancaster, PA:8.
- Ketchum, Howard.(1949) How to Use Color and Decorating Designs in the Home. The Greystone Press.
- Vanderlaan Tile Company,(1952 edition) Faience & Tile Sales Catalog. New York, N.Y.: Vanderlaan Tile Co.
- Vanderlaan Tile Company,(1957 edition) Faience & Tile Sales Catalog. New York, N.Y.: Vanderlaan Tile Co., listed in Tile Heritage Foundation Catalog Collection(Nov. 2018):(1136) Vanderlaan Tile Company 1957.
