= Georg Jensen Inc. (New York City) =

Department Store

Georg Jensen, Inc.
- Logo used from 1940 to 1968
- Formerly: Georg Jensen Handmade Silver, Inc.
- Type: Private
- Industry: Retail
- Founded: 1923; 103 years ago in New York City
- Founder: Frederik Lunning
- Defunct: 1968
- Fate: Buy-out
- Number of locations: 5 stores (1966)
- Products: Silver; porcelain; crystal; Furniture
- Revenue: $8 million (1968)
- Owner: Lunning family

Georg Jensen Inc. (formerly Georg Jensen Handmade Silver, Inc.) was a gift and department store known for Scandinavian imports located in midtown Manhattan at 667 Fifth Avenue at 53rd Street, which existed from 1935 to 1968. The firm was established in 1923, respectively incorporated in 1928, as the official importer and vendor of Georg Jensen A/S in the United States, until its dissolution.

== History ==
In 1922, Danish-born Frederik Lunning (1881–1952), a bookseller and silver vendor, who originally hailed from Grenaa, Denmark, immigrated to New York City, where he opened his first store on West 57th Street, across from Carnegie Hall, primarily selling imported products from Georg Jensen A/S. The company was incorporated as Georg Jensen Handmade Silver, Inc., on June 6, 1928. Lunning became the official importer and vendor of Georg Jensen in the United States. The firm also distributed a glossy yearly mail-order catalog illustrated with museum-quality photographs, starting in 1936.

The Battle of the Atlantic cut off imports starting in 1939 prompting Jensen's, a major importer from Europe, to cultivate North American artisans, some of whom had emigrated from Europe, and fill their shelves with quality goods: silver jewelry, turned wood, art enamel, tiles and ceramics, lamps. With wartime materials restrictions, Jensen's launched in fall 1942 "The Lunning Collection," a modern furniture collection comprising 21 designs by Jens Risom, executed by Jensen's, along with pieces designed and executed by Otto Christiansen.

In 1952, Frederik Lunning died at age 70, at this point his only son, Just Lunning (1910–1965) became president of the company. He managed Georg Jensen Inc. until his sudden death in 1965. In 1966, the company expanded with the establishment of a separate furniture showroom in Manhattan and satellite stores in Manhasset and Scarsdale, New York as well as in Millburn and Paramus, New Jersey. In 1968, The Trustees of the Estate of Frederik K. Lunning sold their interests in the firm to an investor group, namely Rothschild interests, White Weld & Co., New York-based investment bankers and Doyle Dane Bernbach.

At the time of the sale the company had an annual estimated turnover of $8 million (equivalent approximately $70–75 million in 2025). In 1978, the last of a series of successor stores and corporations declared bankruptcy. Currently, Georg Jensen products are distributed directly by the manufacturer, as well as by several authorized retailers.

== Designers and artists ==
The yearly illustrated mail-order catalogs published by Georg Jensen Inc from 1936 offer the designs of many famous artists, including Georg Jensen, Jens Risom, Dorothy Thorpe, enamelists H. Edward Winter and Karl Drerup, and Carol Janeway, silversmiths Madeleine Turner, Jo Pol, LaPaglia, wood turner Otto Christiansen, among others.

== Bibliography ==
- Drucker, Janet (2001). "A New Market: Georg Jensen Silver in the United States". Georg Jensen, A Tradition of Splendid Silver. Atglen, PA: Schiffer Publications.
- Moro, Ginger (November 1996). "Behind the Scenes at Georg Jensen USA: The War Years". Silver Magazine: 28–34.
- Jenssen, Victoria (2022). "Ch.3: Georg Jensen Inc, Frederik Lunning, and Carol Janeway". The Art of Carol Janeway: A Tile & Ceramics Career with Georg Jensen Inc. and Ossip Zadkine in 1940s Manhattan. Friesen Press.
- Janet Drucker; Nancy Schiffer (2008). "Georg Jensen, Copenhagen, Denmark, and Georg Jensen Inc USA". Jensen Silver: The American Designs. Atglen, PA: Schiffer Publishing. pp. 7–11.
- Taylor, David A., ed. (2005). Georg Jensen Jewelry. Yale University Press for the Bard Graduate Center for Studies in the Decorative Arts.
