= Paglia =

Paglia is an Italian surname. Notable people with the surname include:

- Antonio Paglia (1680–1747), Italian painter
- Camille Paglia (born 1947), American social critic, academic, and author
- Ernesto Paglia (born 1959), Brazilian television journalist
- Francesco Paglia (1636–1700), Italian painter
- Nicola Paglia (1197–1256), Italian Roman Catholic priest
- Vincenzo Paglia (born 1945), Italian Roman Catholic bishop

== See also ==
- Paglia (river)
- La Paglia, a surname
