= Tusnelda Sanders =

Danish primitivist painter and illustrator

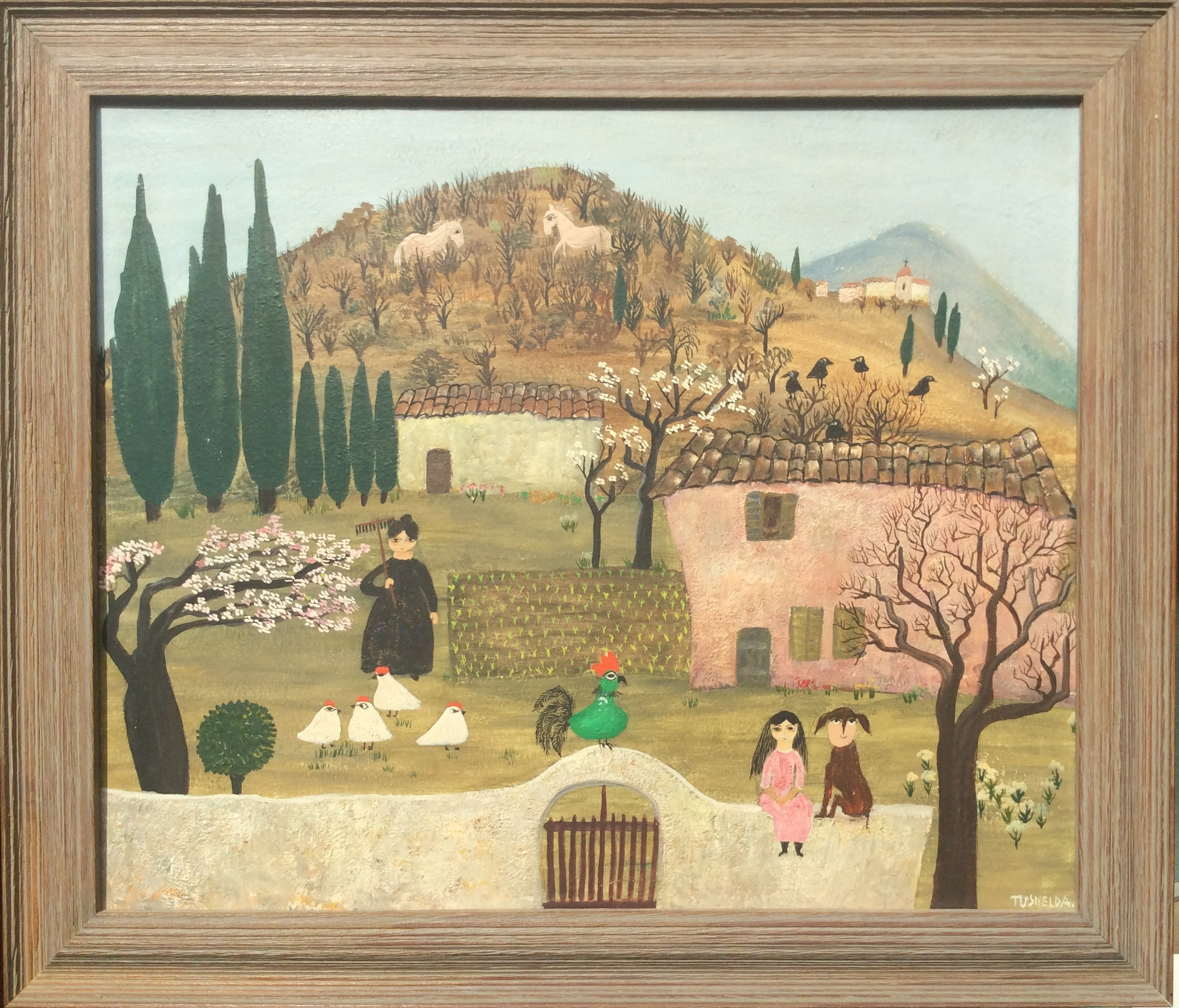
Tusnelda Sanders. Farm with children, birds, and dog. tempera on masonite. Cober Gallery, NYC. 1960s.

Tusnelda Sanders (born Frida Nielsen, 1894–1978) was a noted Danish primitivist painter and illustrator whose works were sold both in France and in North American galleries from 1944 until her death. Her graphic illustrations were used in books and posters. From the 1920s until her death, she lived and made art in Cagnes-sur-Mer, the artists' colony on the Cote d’Azur near Nice, France. Her works are signed with the single name, "Tusnelda." Her unofficial name-change to Tusnelda in midlife awaits explanation.

== Career ==
Tusnelda Sanders is known for her primitive landscape and village-scape paintings, depicting Cagnes-sur-Mer, signed Tusnelda in block letters, and executed in egg-tempera paint on rigid masonite sheets. Little is known about art she made in Cagnes-sur-Mer before WWII. Having fled France to New York City in 1941, she lived among artists in Greenwich Village for the duration of the war. She decorated tiles for Harold Ambellan's Designed Tiles silkscreen studio along with other artists in exile and learned about American taste for primitive paintings and outsider art.

Exhibiting under the name Tusnelda, she had her first solo exhibition in 1944 in New York City at Bonestell Galleries. Given another solo exhibition by Bonestell Galleries in Spring of 1945, her primitive paintings received positive press coverage. According to her review in the Sunday New York Times, she had taken up painting during her wartime exile in New York City. Howard Devries, their arts reporter, described her paintings in 1945: “Sophisticatedly artless paintings by Tusnelda, at the Bonestell, hark back to the Victorian “modern primitive” in their appeal. Amusing fantasy and sly humor blend in the work.”

Returning to Cagnes-sur-Mer after World War II, she would ship the paintings to galleries abroad. The Cober Gallery of New York held yearly exhibits in the 1960s. She sold paintings in Cagnes and also contributed them to fundraisers. (See list of exhibitions, below)

Tusnelda Sanders is often noted as the sitter for several famous portraits.Vilhelm Lundstrøm’s Portrait of Tusnelda Sanders of 1928 was painted before her formal marriage to Sanders so that its title reflects her married name at the time it was purchased by Norway’s National Museum in 1951. Stella Bowen, Australian portrait artist and ex-wife of Ford Madox Ford, described her month-long stay with Ross and Tusnelda, using that name, in 1936 and painted at least three depictions of Tusnelda’s life there, including her oil portrait of Tusnelda now in the Australian War Museum.

A Danish-language cookbook of 1957 about artists living in the Mediterranean was entitled Make It Easy As Tusnelda. It included her graphic illustrations and several of her recipes served up to guests over the years.

In the 1960s, George Caspari Inc. offered a boxed selection of twenty greeting cards depicting reproductions of four paintings by Tusnelda. In 1966, UNICEF chose to reproduce one painting, “Dancing Children,” part of a suite of painters’ designs for their Christmas cards, sold as fundraisers for needy children.

== Personal life ==
She was born Frida Nielsen on 26 October 1894 in Copenhagen, Denmark, to Thyra (Marie Bachmann) and Carl Christian Edvard Nielsen. In 1916, she married a visiting Danish-American agricultural student, Harald H. Foght Moeller, and returned with him to Ord, Nebraska, where she lived three years on the Moeller family farm. They had two children, Berte and Sigurd, who accompanied her to Denmark in 1919 to visit her ailing mother but the three did not return to the U.S. nor to the marriage.

In the 1920s, Frida Nielsen Moeller followed her Danish friends, painter Vilhelm Lundstrøm and wife Yrsa Hansen, to the artist colony Cagnes-sur-Mer, near Nice. There in the 1920s she met the American artist Roswell (Ross or Sandy) Sanders. He had been wounded in 1916 driving an American Field Service (AFS) ambulance near Verdun, France, received the Croix de Guerre and, with funding from the AFS, he eventually returned to France to study art. She seems to have commenced calling herself Tusnelda in this period.

As Frida Nielsen, she purchased the house at 6 Place Grimaldi, Haut-Cagnes, which is depicted in a photograph captioned in Danish,"Tusnelda Sanders hus, Haut-de-Cagnes, 1925," in the 1993 monograph about Vilhelm Lundstrøm. She and Ross converted the downstairs stable to a suite for paying guests, usually artists and writers on sojourn. Stella Bowen painted a view of this room with fireplace in 1936. Guests using this lodging, described in several books, understood they were not allowed in the lodging during the day so as not to disturb the artist-couple using it as a studio. A photograph of the exterior of her second studio in Haut-Cagnes is labelled in Danish as "Tusnelda Sanders hus Haut-de-Cagnes, 1993" in the 1993 Lundstrøm monograph.

Under her maiden name Frida Nielsen, “artiste peintre,” she and Ross Stevens Sanders married in Cagnes-sur- mer on March 20, 1941 as they prepared to flee France. They sailed from Lisbon as American citizens arriving in New York City on 30 June 1941. Their fellow passengers were French-Russian sculptor Ossip Zadkine and cartoonist Saul Steinberg. The Sanders joined her son Sigurd living there since 1938. Her daughter Berte is understood to have moved to Copenhagen. The Sanders are on record as living at 220 Green Street and also 230 Wooster Street in Manhattan. Ross worked overseas with the US Army and an early form of the United Nations. Tusnelda worked in Harold Ambellan's Designed Tiles silkscreen studio in Manhattan and commenced exhibiting her naive paintings starting in 1944.

Back in Cagnes-sur-Mer after the war, Ross and Tusnelda returned to the high-spirited social life of Cagnards before the war: extravagant yearly costume balls, art exhibitions, leisurely patio lunches and large dinner parties, a lifestyle described by Michel Gaudet. Place Grimaldi 6 remained home until their deaths. Roswell Sanders predeceased her in 1967. Tusnelda continued to paint and died at home on 3 July 1978. Robert Buson of Nice Matin penned her obituary: “La cité des peintres as perd en Tusnelda une artiste de talent et une amie…"

== Current revival ==
There is a revival of interest in the paintings and life of Tusnelda Sanders. In 2011, the large retrospective of Cagnard painters at the Château-Musée Grimaldi, Haut-de-Cagnes, included her paintings. The detailed companion exhibition catalog of this retrospective, also published in 2011 by Ville de Cagnes-sur-Mer, presented an essay on her art and her life.

There are steady sales of her paintings since the early 2000s, mostly in North America, where many were originally sold starting in 1944. An art historical monograph on the ceramic art of Carol Janeway(1913-1989) discusses Tusnelda's art career during her New York sojourn during World War II. A website, www.tusneldasanders.com, is devoted to showing her paintings and describing her life.

== Exhibitions ==
Solo Exhibitions

- 1944, 1945, 1946 - Bonestell Gallery, New York City
- 1957 - Galerie Laurine, Copenhagen, Denmark
- 1962, 1963, 1965, 1966, 1967 - Cober Gallery, New York City

Group Shows

- 1951 - Galerie Muratore, Nice, France
- 1951 - Den Frie Udstillings Bygning, Copenhagen Denmark
- 1952 - Galerie Las Arts, Vence, France
- 1960 - Salle Jean Graille, La Ciotat, France
- 1960 - Musee d'Art et d'Archaeologie, Toulon, France
- 1965 - Annual Purchase Exhibition, Illinois Wesleyan University, Bloomington, IL
- 1969 - LaTortue Galerie, Santa Monica, CA
- 1972 - The Art Wagon Galleries, Scottsdale, AZ
- 1974 - Elaine Horwitch Gallery, Scottsdale, AZ

Over a period of years:

- La Maison Danoise, Paris, France
- Maison des Artistes, Cagnes, France

== Bibliography ==
- Bowen, Stella (1941). Drawn from Life. London: Collins Publishers Ltd.
- Buson, Robert, «La cité des peintres as perd en Tusnelda une artiste de talent et une amie...» Nice-Matin. 5 juillet 1978.
- Designed Tiles. (2023, November 7).
- Gaudet, Michel (2001). La Vie du Haut de Cagnes (1930-1980) la bohème ensoleillé. Nice: Demaistre.
- Jenssen, Victoria (2022). The Art of Carol Janeway: A Tile & Ceramics Career with Georg Jensen Inc. and Ossip Zadkine in 1940s Manhattan. Altona MB: Friesen Press. ISBN 978-1-03-913087-6.
- Journiac, Virginie, Guillaume Aral, Château-Musée Grimaldi (2011). C'était t'en souviens-tu, à Cagnes: Exposition Rétrospective des Peintres de Cagnes-sur-Mer. Cagnes-sur-Mer, France: Ville de Cagnes-sur-Mer. https://www.academia.edu/41346483/_C_%C3%A9tait_t_en_souviens_tu_%C3%A0_Cagnes_ (pages 76 and 84)
- Paludan, Else (1957). Gør det let som Tusnelda: en causerende kogebog om sjov mad i sjove omgivelser. Copenhagen: Aage Hirschprung.
- Swados, Harvey (1963). "Tusnelda Sanders," Exhibition Brochure Tusnelda. New York: Cober Gallery.
