= Tile Heritage Foundation =

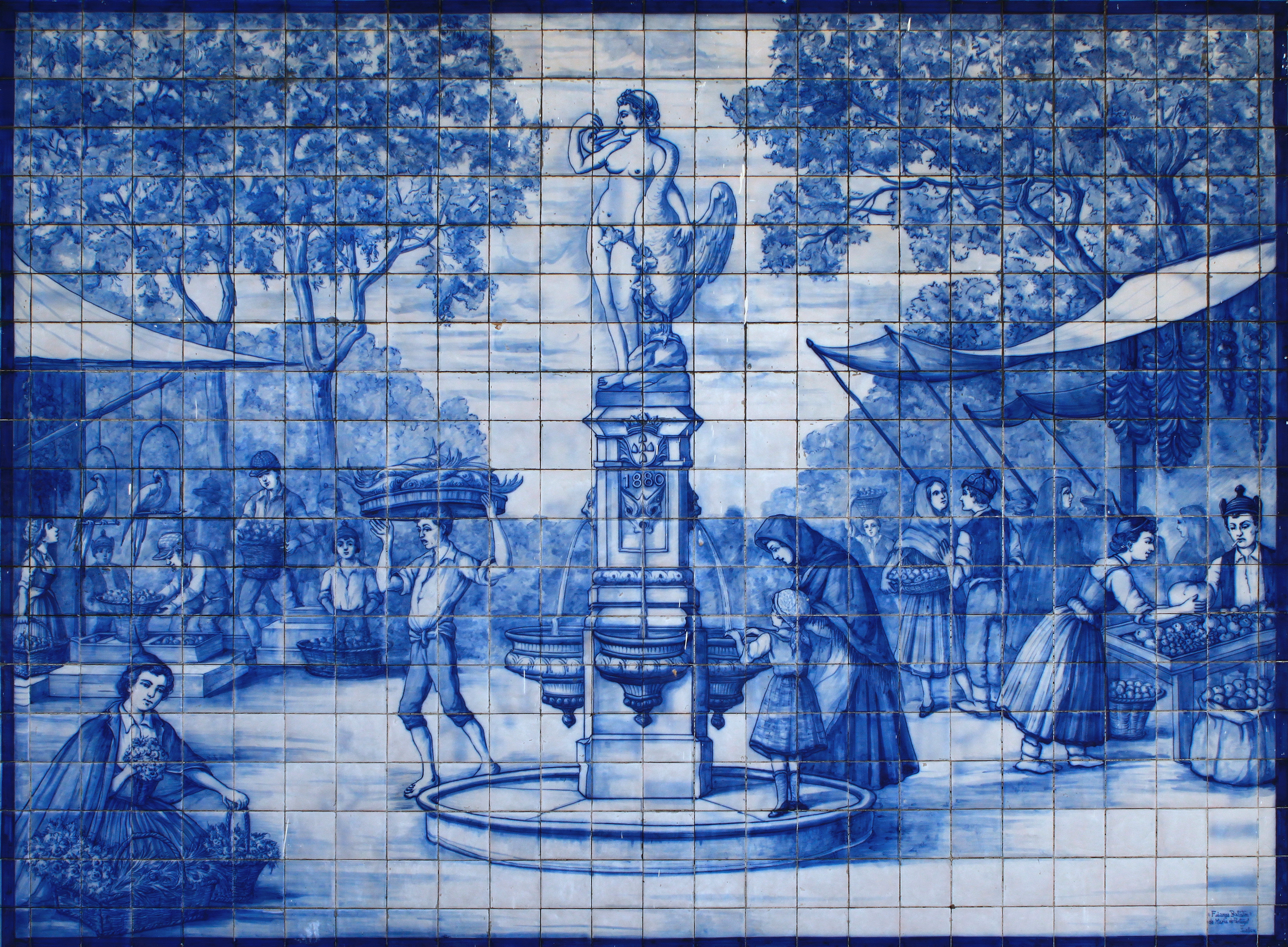
A work on ceramic tiles depicting a market scene

The Tile Heritage Foundation is an archival library and resource center dedicated to the preservation of ceramic surfacing materials in the United States. It is located in Healdsburg, California. Open to the public by appointment. It was founded in 1987 by Joseph Taylor and Sheila Menzies. The archives catalog information about historic and contemporary tile makers in the United States, and maintains a collection of over 4,000 historic and contemporary tiles, all of them donated. The Foundation is a member supported non-profit organization. Sponsorship, grants, gifts and membership as well as contemporary tile sales support the ongoing work of education, publishing and archiving. They have published works on the history of tile in the US.
