= La Paglia =

La Paglia or LaPaglia is a surname or last name. Notable people with the surname include:

- Anthony LaPaglia (born 1959), Australian actor, brother of Jonathan LaPaglia
- Brianna LaPaglia (born 1999), American influencer and podcaster
- César La Paglia (born 1979), Argentine football player
- Jonathan LaPaglia (born 1969), Australian actor, brother of Anthony LaPaglia

== See also ==
- Paglia
