= Esteban Soriano =

Puerto Rican artist and musician (1900–1969)

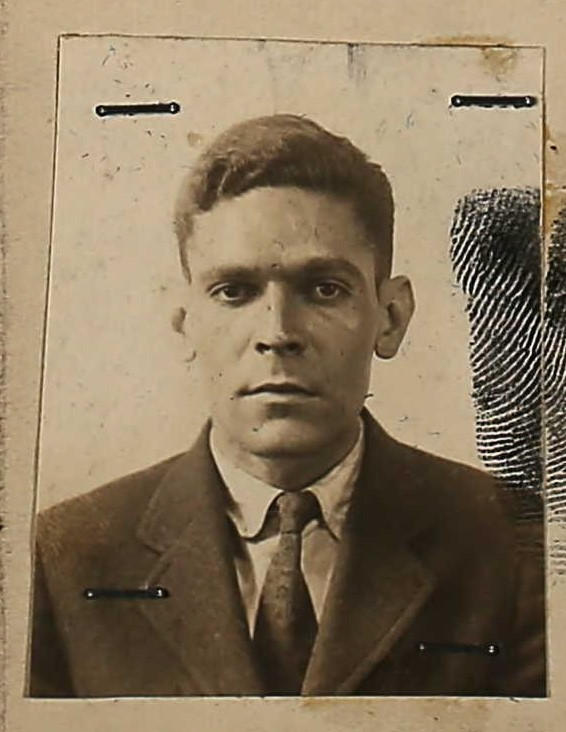
- Born: 11 March 1900; San Juan, Puerto Rico
- Died: 21 December 1969 (aged 69); New York, New York
- Education: Boys’ Charity School, Santurce, San Juan
- Known for: Caricatures, Cartoons, Tiles, Ceramics, Paintings
- Movement: Primitivism

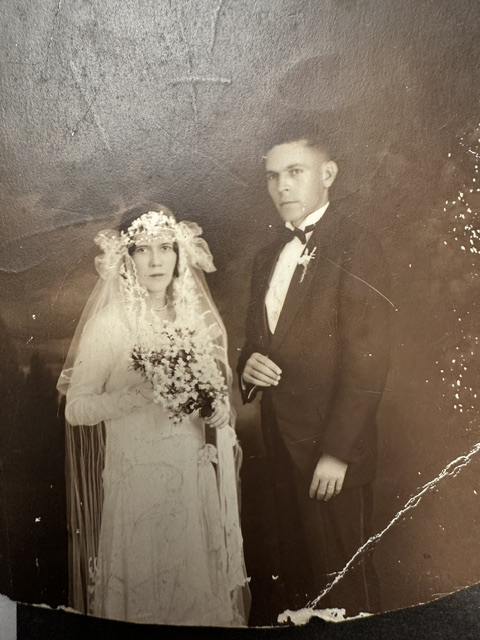
Wedding portrait of Esteban Soriano and Aura Valdés in the city of Colón, Republic of Panama, 1930

Esteban Soriano (1900–1969) was a caricaturist, cartoonist, painter, decorator of ceramics, and musician who was active in New York City starting in 1935.

Esteban Soriano's Puerto Rican identity was central to his artistic career, with critics linking his vivid colors and tropical motifs to his island roots. Researchers have recently commenced restoring his place in the art history of the Puerto Rican diaspora. In Becoming Julia de Burgos: the making of a Puerto Rican Icon (2014), Vanessa Pérez-Rosario discussed his 1944 interview with Julia de Burgos for Pueblos Hispanos. In “Tiles of Esteban Soriano and Soriano Ceramics Inc: New York City mid-20th century tile studios” for Tile Heritage (2026), Victoria Jenssen investigated his ceramics career and biography.

== Early life ==
Born in San Juan, Puerto Rico on March 11, 1900, Esteban Eulogio Soriano y Gonzales was already a U.S. citizen. The 1910 census listed him as white (“B" for blanco) and living at the noted progressive trade school, Boys’ Charity School (Hogar Insular para Niňos or Escuela de Caridad de Niños or Asilo de Niños), in Santurce, San Juan, where he developed his artistic and musical talents. His adult career in cartooning reflects the lively political cartooning for which San Juan newspapers of the day were renowned. At the age of sixteen he contributed art to the magazines Puerto Rico Ilustrado and El Diluvio after which he claimed to have moved to New York City. At age 25 in New York he applied for his Seaman's Certificate of American Citizenship to continue working as a steward on ocean liners (see identification photograph in Infobox). Later that year he enlisted in the US Army, serving in the Panama Canal Zone and playing six years in a military band. In 1930, he married Aura Valdés, his first wife, in Colón, on the Atlantic side of Panama. They had two sons, Steven, born in 1931, and George, born in 1932. Discharged in 1931, he returned to New York City from Cristobal in 1935 on the SS Ancon, leaving Aura and the boys in Panama.

== Career ==
He was already a caricaturist and cartoonist when he arrived in New York City in 1935 and, starting in September 1936, his caricatures appeared regularly in the socialist weekly, New Masses. The WPA's Federal Writers’ Project included his line-drawings with those of other artists in the Almanac for New Yorkers 1937. The following two editions, the 1938 and 1939 Almanac for New Yorkers were illustrated exclusively with Soriano cartoons.

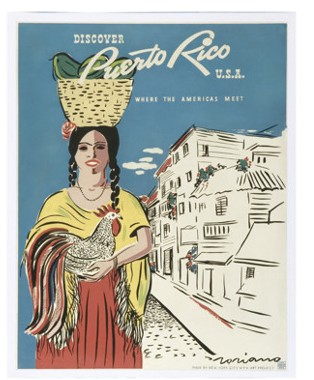
Esteban Soriano's signed poster commissioned by the Puerto Rican Institute for Tourism for the 1939 New York World's Fair and executed by the New York City WPA Art Project. silkscreen. 1939.

His silkscreened poster, Discover Puerto Rico USA, was produced by the New York City WPA Art Project for the Puerto Rican Institute for Tourism for the 1939 World's Fair. The woman carries a rooster like one later incorporated in the logo of Soriano Ceramics Inc. Each print is signed since he had integrated his cursive signature, “Soriano,” into the image's silkscreen stencil.

Soriano was active in New York's leftist art community, using his art for protest and fundraising. The New York Times reported on some political street theatre when, on September 14, 1938, Soriano and seven other artists including Rockwell Kent and William Gropper painted and sold political posters on major Manhattan street corners to raise funds for the American Relief Ship for Spain, supporting the anti-fascist cause in the Spanish Civil War. He frequently exhibited with this circle of socially- engaged artists. Both the Daily Worker and New York Times published notices of his public Chalk talks performed at fundraisers and later on early TV's Kate Smith Show. Part of his act was to transform audience squiggles into caricatures. Described as “tall, dark, and speaking with a trace of his Spanish ancestry,” he had stage presence and continued performing the Chalk talks throughout his life.

In 1942, Soriano married Jean (Virginia) Sager (1911–1995). Both worked with the socialist weekly New Masses, moved in together in 1940 in St. Mark's Place, Lower East Side, then in 1943 moved to Sunnyside, Queens for their daughter Stephanie's birth.

1942-1949 Esteban Soriano's underglaze ceramics career

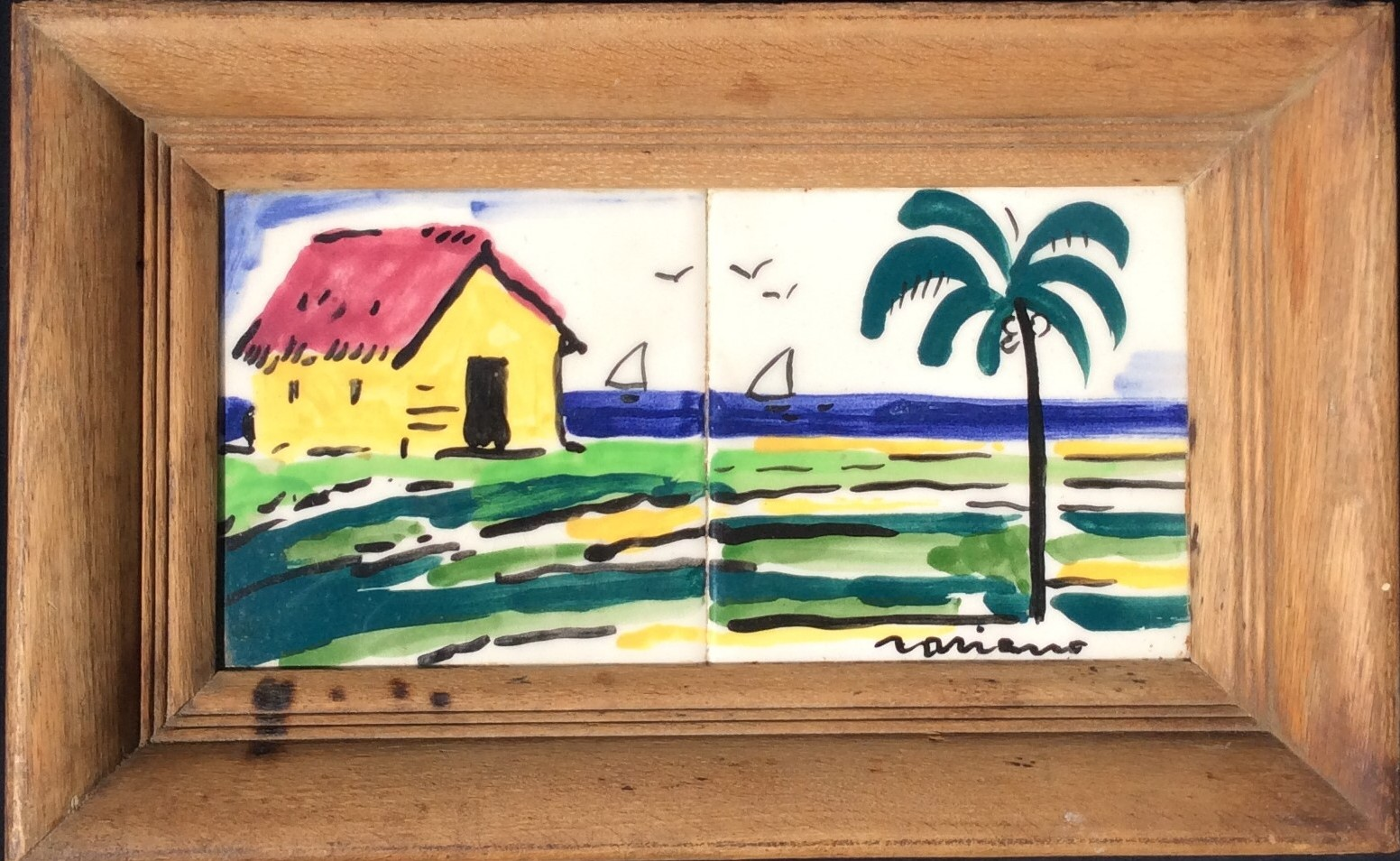
Soriano's Caribbean-themed tile tray decorated by hand using underglaze paints. ca.1948.

John Melden's article on Soriano in the 29 May 1945 Daily Worker reported that “Soriano ... says he started experimenting in ceramics more or less as a hobby.” By 1941, fellow WPA artist Harold Ambellan (1912–2006) had established a silkscreened underglaze tile printing studio,Designed Tiles, at 22 East 21 Street in New York's Flatiron District. New to underglaze tile decoration himself, he and wife Elisabeth Higgins invited friends to paint tiles at their weekly parties in their 31 East 21th Street apartment loft. Guests would pick up their fired tile at a later party. Advertisements of 1942 and 1943 show that Ambellan's Designed Tiles studio offered at least three unsigned silkscreen-printed tiles, their designs now attributed to Soriano: a horse, a rooster, and a tropical village scene. These tiles indicate the salability of his silkscreen designs and also confirm his connections with Ambellan's studio. Soriano and Designed Tiles did not fabricate tiles or tile coasters. Rather, they purchased unglazed tile blanks from Wheeling Tile Company, decorated them using underglaze paints, applied clear overglaze, and then fired them.

An illustrated account of Soriano's late 1942 debut as a solo tile decorator appeared in the New York Times Magazine describing Soriano tiles offered by Rena Rosenthal, 485 Madison Ave., for $10 each. His breakthrough came in April 1944 with a one-man exhibition at the Council for Pan-American Democracy, featuring his paintings and decorated ceramics that highlighted his Puerto Rican identity. Reviews praised his colorful, lively style. Puerto Rican poet, writer and activist Julia de Burgos profiled him that month in Pueblos Hispanos, linking his art to his island roots.

That same year, Cauman gallery at 14 East 50th St, showcased Ceramics by Esteban Soriano, earning him a column-long New Yorker Magazine review in their “Shopping On and Off the Avenue.” His tiles were sold individually or mounted as trays, bookends, and coasters. House & Garden magazine noted his “samba-land” inspiration when depicting his coasters for sale at Malcolm's in Baltimore. Months later, the New York Times photographed an array of Soriano's decorated tiles to illustrate a feature article on the popularity of tiles. The article goes on to say of Soriano: “...a water-colorist whose simple Latin-American landscapes and satirical sketches of dancers adorn tiled bookends, trays, plant stands and coasters....”

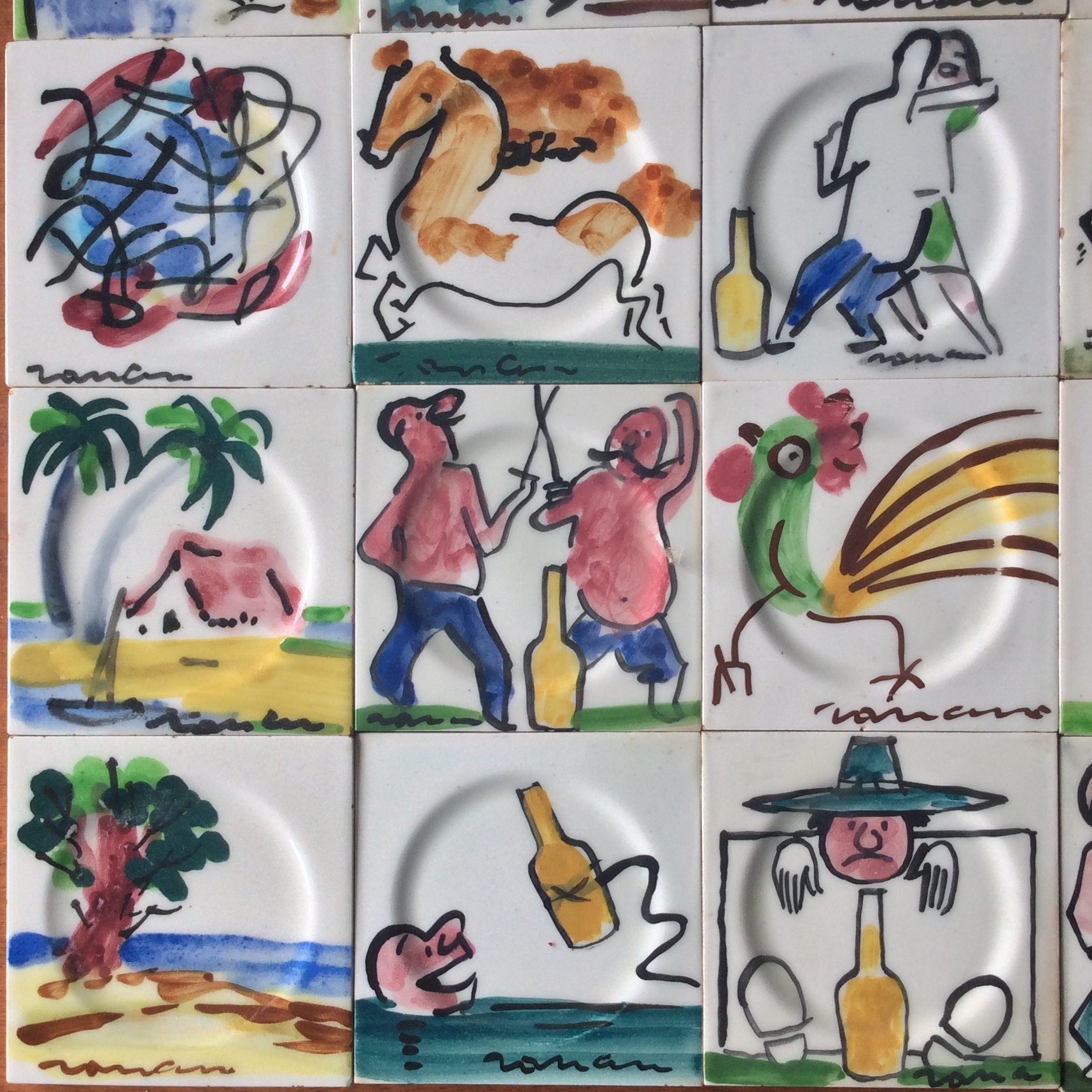
Esteban Soriano. tile coasters with cartoon motifs, hand-decorated in underglaze. 1944-1948.

He proceeded from tiles and tile coasters to fabricating beer mugs. He depicted liquor and drinking in his cartoon style when decorating these wares. What studio fired his wares unknown. The Soriano beer mugs and coffee mugs are slip-cast and unique in shape which suggests that a ceramic studio made these for him, and later fired on his decorations. One studio has been suggested: Igo Leumi's Kroywen studio (New York spelled backwards) at 304 West 11th Street.

1944-45: Travelling Exhibition: Ceramics by Esteban Soriano

Soriano’s tiles and ceramics were exhibited in a one-man travelling show which started in November 1944 at the Zanesville Art Institute in Ohio and continued to El Paso, Shreveport, Springfield, MA, and Utica. Soriano did not accompany the tour which was organized by Blanche A. Byerly (1881–1968), formerly Executive Secretary of New York’s Art Center and a veteran producer of travelling art shows.

1947-1970s: Soriano Ceramics Inc.

By January 1947, Soriano Ceramics Inc. had been incorporated, operated by Esteban’s brother-in-law, Leonard H. “Lenny” Sager (1921–2016), a chemist. By January 1947, the Brooklyn Eagle reported that Soriano Ceramics Inc. had leased a Queens factory at 20-21 Steinway Street, Long Island City, from Harsag Holding Corporation, owned by Esteban Soriano's father-in-law, Harold Sager. Jenssen proposes that the Sager family's creation of Soriano Ceramics Inc involved purchasing Esteban's indebtedness. Lenny Sager took over the silkscreen printing operation, firings, the marketing and business end, leaving Soriano free to develop screenprint designs and hand-paint ceramics. From 1947, all tiles and other ceramics sold by Soriano Ceramics Inc. bore distinctive labels with the Soriano Ceramics name and a cartoon rooster logo. In 1958-59 these trademarks were registered along with a cardboard display package unit. Photographs of Soriano Ceramics in Mary Roche's 1948 article show Esteban's hand-painted tiles along with the firm's screen printed offerings.

Esteban’s tenure at the firm was relatively short, four or five years, and increasingly intermittent. Esteban's silkscreen designs incorporated his cursive signature and were now part of Sager’s inventory: their sales outlasted his stay at that studio.

1949-1969:

He increasingly returned to his roots as a caricaturist and illustrator, a trade with little overhead. News items recorde the numerous events where he entertained with his chalk talks. By Spring 1956 Soriano was registered to vote in Manhattan, having moved from his home in Queens. Jean filed for divorce the following year.

In the early 1960s Soriano was living as a domiciliary member, active in their recreation program, in the Veterans Administration Center in Biloxi, Mississippi. A photograph in the local newspaper shows the 63 year-old Esteban Soriano presenting a trophy.

He left Biloxi to marry the widow Grace B. Fidler of Royersford, Pennsylvania in January 1965. The marriage was short-lived.

The US Social Security Death Index lists his death on 21 December 1969 and 10036 as the zipcode of his last residence: Hell’s Kitchen, West Midtown, the theatre district of New York City. He was given a timely and organized veteran’s burial only four days later in Long Island National Cemetery suggesting that he died in hospital and indicating the Veterans Administration’s involvement with his living arrangements in New York City.
