= Sarah Burch =

Canadian environmental scientist

Sarah Lynn Burch
- Education: University of British Columbia; University of Calgary
- Scientific career
- Workplaces: University of Waterloo; University of Oxford
- Thesis: Local responses to climate change : an exploration of the relationship between capacity and action. (2009)

Sarah Burch is a Canadian environmental scientist who is Canada Research Chair at the University of Waterloo. Her research considers strategies to respond to climate change at the community scale. She is a lead author for the IPCC Sixth Assessment Report.

== Early life and education ==
Burch studied international relationships and environmental sciences at the University of Calgary. She was a doctoral researcher at the University of British Columbia, before moving to the United Kingdom as a postdoctoral researcher, where she worked at the University of Oxford.

== Research and career ==
In 2013, Burch returned to Canada, where she joined the faculty at the University of Waterloo. She worked as an Assistant Professor and coordinated research fellows for the Earth System Governance Project. In 2015, Burch was appointed a Canada Research Chair in Sustainability Governance. Her research considers strategies to mitigate the impact of climate change in communities. In particular, she has studied how small businesses can contribute to global efforts for sustainability. By investigating inertia built into urban planning and governance, Burch hopes to understand the origins of carbon-intensive developments. Burch works as the Director of the Sustainability Policy Research on Urban Transformations (SPROUT) Lab. She was involved with delivering the world's first massive open online course on climate change.

After contributing to the IPCC Fourth Assessment Report, Burch was made a lead author on the IPCC Sixth Assessment Report. When the IPCC Sixth Assessment Report reported its findings in 2022, Burch explained that to avoid a climate catastrophe, the world had three years to reduce emissions.

== Awards and honours ==
- 2017 Royal Society of Canada College of New Scholars
- 2018 Canada's Top 40 Under 40

== Selected publications ==
- Burch, Sarah L. (2014). Understanding climate change : science, policy, and practice. Sara E. Harris. Toronto. ISBN 978-1-4426-4652-0. OCLC 865495408.
- Stephen R.J. Sheppard; Alison Shaw; David Flanders; Sarah Burch; Arnim Wiek; Jeff Carmichael; John Robinson; Stewart Cohen (May 2011). "Future visioning of local climate change: A framework for community engagement and planning with scenarios and visualisation". Futures. 43 (4): 400–412. doi:10.1016/j.futures.2011.01.009. ISSN 0016-3287. Wikidata Q58391181.
- Alison Shaw; Stephen Sheppard; Sarah Burch; David Flanders; Arnim Wiek; Jeff Carmichael; John Robinson; Stewart Cohen (October 2009). "Making local futures tangible—Synthesizing, downscaling, and visualizing climate change scenarios for participatory capacity building". Global Environmental Change. 19 (4): 447–463. doi:10.1016/j.gloenvcha.2009.04.002. ISSN 0959-3780. Wikidata Q58391211.
- Christopher Luederitz; Niko Schäpke; Arnim Wiek; et al. (December 2017). "Learning through evaluation – A tentative evaluative scheme for sustainability transition experiments". Journal of Cleaner Production. 169: 61–76. doi:10.1016/j.jclepro.2016.09.005. ISSN 0959-6526. Wikidata Q55861252.
