= Harold Ambellan =

American sculptor

Harold Ambellan (1912–2006) was an American sculptor. Born in Buffalo, New York and relocated to New York City, Ambellan provided sculpture for New Deal-era projects and served as President of the Sculptors Guild in 1941, prior to his service in the U.S. military. Ambellan exiled himself to France in 1954 because of his political views.

== New York ==
Ambellan was born on May 24, 1912, in Buffalo, New York. While studying sculpture and fine arts in Buffalo, he was awarded a scholarship to the Art Students League of New York in 1930, where he spent the following two years. Beginning in 1932, Ambellan was based in Greenwich Village and became a significant figure in its social history of the 1930s and early 1940s. For instance, in the 1940s Ambellan and his fiancée Elisabeth Higgins hosted both Pete Seeger and Woody Guthrie at 31 East 21st Street. Guthrie contributed his song, "It Takes a Married Man to Sing a Worried Song", for their wedding.

From 1935 until 1939, he was one of the many American artists who benefited from Roosevelt's Federal Art Project. With fellow sculptor Robert Cronbach, Ambellan created a series of semi-abstract tinted-concrete mural sculptures entitled Family and Learning, for the Willert Park Courts, a public housing project in Buffalo, New York, as well as a sculpture for Brooklyn College in New York. He was also one of the artists featured in the 1938 group show, Subway Art, at the Museum of Modern Art.

Ambellan was elected President of the Sculptors Guild in 1941, the same year that his work was exhibited in group shows at both the Metropolitan Museum of Art in New York and the Academy of Fine Arts in Philadelphia.

After the collapse of Federal Arts Project grants and building on the achievements of the WPA's New York Poster studio, Ambellan explored silkscreening as a method of decorating ceramic tiles. He and wife Elisabeth Higgins, not an artist, established Designed Tiles with the financial help of patio furniture manufacturer John Salterini, whose Mediterranean tile supply was cut off early in World War II. The Designed Tiles studio was financially successful, selling to tile wholesalers, and hired artists from New York and exiles from Europe. The Danish folk-artist, Tusnelda Sanders, has been identified as one of these artists. With the help of a manager and despite the war, travel and their late 1940s divorce, the Ambellans operated Designed Tiles from 1941 to 1958, when it was sold to friends, the Sklanskys.

In 1944, as a member of the U.S. Navy, Ambellan participated in the liberation of Normandy. Upon his return to New York, he spent two years teaching three-dimensional art at the Workshop School. Although the artists, who became known as the Abstract Expressionists, were among his friends in New York, Ambellan remained committed to the figurative in both his sculpture and painting.

Ambellan's name was published in 1948 documents of the House Un-American Activities Committee in connection with his support for the American Artists' Congress and the Artists' Front to Win the War. For his political views he became a victim of the tide of McCarthyism sweeping the country, which culminated in his decision to exile to France in 1954. He intended to stay in France for one year, but later decided to make his home there.

== France ==
After living several years in Montparnasse, one of the principal artistic communities of Paris, Ambellan decided to settle in the Greek-Roman enclave town of Antibes on the Côte d'Azur. In 1980, he settled in the Provençal town of Arles, where he lived until the end of his life.

In France, he continued his exploration of the human figure in art, with the emphasis shifting over time from sculpture to painting. While exhibiting throughout Europe (culminating in two retrospectives: in 1976, at the Museum Baden in Solingen, Germany; and in 2001, at the Espace Van Gogh in Arles), he created, most notably, a collection of medals for the Monnaie de Paris, as well as a monumental sculpture and several smaller pieces for the Nathan Cummings Collection. Ambellan pointed to sources as varied as German Expressionism and cubism to Greek, Indian and African art as his sources of inspiration.

Surrounded by family and friends, Ambellan died in Arles on April 21, 2006.

== Exhibitions and commissions ==
- 1935: Exhibition ACA Gallery, New York City.
- 1936-38: Federal Art Project:

Mural sculptures for Willert Park Courts, Buffalo, New York, with Robert Cronbach.
Sculpture for Brooklyn College, New York.
Animal Sculptures for Buffalo Zoo.

- 1937: Collective exhibition with the Bombshell Group, New York.
- 1938: Collective exhibition Subway Art, Museum of Modern Art, New York.
- 1939: Exhibition of Federation of Modern Painters and Sculptors, Wildenstein Gallery, New York.
- 1941: Collective exhibition, Metropolitan Museum of Art, New York.

Exhibition Pennsylvania Academy of Fine Arts, Philadelphia.

- 1942: Artists for Victory, An Exhibition of Contemporary American Art, The Metropolitan Museum of Art, New York.
- 1942: Plaster relief Gardeners, U.S. Post Office, Metuchen, New Jersey.
- 1947: Sculpture exhibition with Robert Cronbach, 44th Street Gallery, New York.
- 1950: Exhibition Salpeter Gallery, New York.
- 1953: Sculpture for Wedgwood showroom, New York.
- 1961: Exhibition Galerie Jean Camoin, Paris.
- 1971: Exhibition Schneider Gallery, Rome.

Exhibition Galerie du Port, Rolle, Switzerland.

- 1972: Monumental sculpture and various pieces for the Nathan Cummings Collection, Chicago.
- 1976: Retrospective exhibition, Museum of Solingen, Germany.
- 1978: Exhibition Van Remmen Gallery, Solingen, Germany
- 1980: Exhibition Voir le voir, Arles, France.
- 1981: Exhibition Baux de Provence
- 1982: Exhibition Galerie du Cercle, Paris.

Exhibition Centre Culturel de la Jeunesse, Festival de Danse d’Istres, Marseille.

- 1982: Exhibition Van Remmen Gallery, Solingen, Germany.
- 1983: Exhibition Glass Gallery, New York.
- 1987: Exhibition of sculptures, Cannes.

Exhibition Glass Gallery, New York.

- 1988: Exhibition Galerie du Forum, Arles.
- 1990: Exhibition Galerie Art et Communication, Paris.

Exhibition Glass Gallery, New York.

- 1991-94: Exhibition Olympic Art, La Défense, Paris.

Ceramic mural, Le Home, Albertville, France.
Exhibition Hommage à Ambellan, Actes Sud, Arles.
Exhibition Galerie Réattu, Arles.
Exhibition Van Remmen Gallery, Solingen, Germany.
Public auction, Griffin, London.
Public auction, Drouot, Paris.

- 1999: Exhibition Le Bois Retrouvé, Paris.
- 2000: Exhibition Galerie Michèle Paureau, Paris.
- 2001: Retrospective exhibition, Espace Van Gogh, Arles.
