= Van Lanschot Kempen =

Bank in the Netherlands

Van Lanschot Kempen N.V.

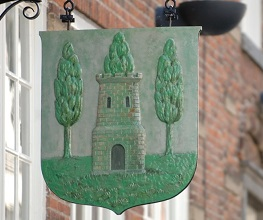
- (Part of) the Van Lanschot crest
- Type: Public
- Traded as: Euronext: VLK; AMX component; AEX Financials component
- ISIN: NL0000302636
- Industry: Banking, Financial services
- Founded: 22 July 1737; 289 years ago
- Headquarters: Hooge Steenweg 29, 5211 JN 's-Hertogenbosch, North Brabant, The Netherlands
- Area served: Worldwide
- Key people: Maarten Edixhoven (CEO); Frans Blom (Chairman of Supervisory Board)
- Products: wealth management; private banking; investment management; investment banking
- Revenue: €754.4 million (2025)
- Net income: €157.4 million (2025)
- AUM: €159 billion (2025)
- Number of employees: 2,099 fte (2025)
- Website: https://www.vanlanschotkempen.com/en; https://www.evivanlanschot.nl

Van Lanschot Kempen N.V. is a specialised, independent, Dutch wealth manager that provides private banking, investment management and investment banking services to wealthy individuals and institutions. It is headquartered in 's-Hertogenbosch, the Netherlands. With a history dating back to 1737, it is the oldest financial institution in the Netherlands and the Benelux and the tenth oldest financial institution in the world.

Van Lanschot Kempen has been recognised as one of the leading Dutch wealth managers, with global recognition for its focus on sustainable investment.

== Corporate structure ==
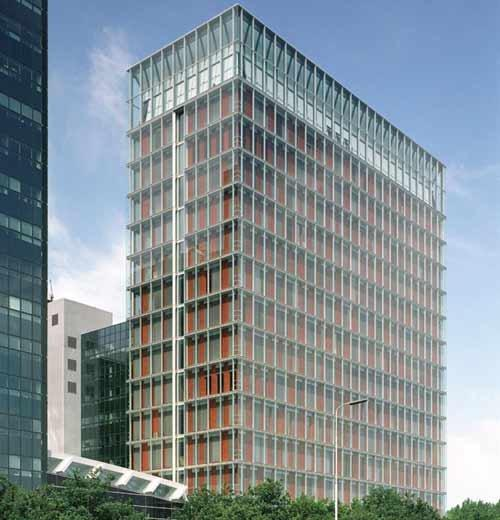
Van Lanschot Kempen's Amsterdam office

Van Lanschot Kempen offers private banking, investment management and investment banking services:

- Private Banking offers services aimed at six target groups in the Netherlands, Belgium and Switzerland (focusing on wealthy Dutch and Belgian nationals): high-net-worth individuals, people new to the wealth management market, entrepreneurs and family businesses, business professionals and executives, healthcare professionals, and foundations and associations. Its private banking activities in Belgium are branded Mercier Van Lanschot .
- Evi van Lanschot is Van Lanschot Kempen's online investment and savings platform targeted at mass affluent clients and first-time investors in the Netherlands and Belgium.
- Investment Management (formerly, Kempen Capital Management (KCM)) is a specialist European and UK investment management boutique focusing on a selected investment strategies, including high-dividend equities, fixed-income securities, funds of hedge funds, real estate, small caps and infrastructure.
- Investment Banking (formerly, Kempen & Co) is a specialist European investment bank boutique focussing on capital market transactions, debt advisory services, equities research and trading and mergers and acquisitions.

Van Lanschot Kempen is authorised by De Nederlandsche Bank (DNB), the Dutch central bank, as a bank in accordance with the Dutch Financial Supervision Act (Dutch: Wet op het financieel toezicht) (Wft). It is under the direct supervision of DNB as a "less significant institution" under European Banking Supervision. In addition, the Netherlands Authority for the Financial Markets (Dutch: Autoriteit Financiële Markten) (AFM) supervises its market conduct.

== History ==
=== Van Lanschot Kempen ===
The history of Van Lanschot Kempen dates back to 22 July 1737, when Cornelis van Lanschot founded a trading house in 's-Hertogenbosch. It originally traded in colonial goods within the areas of Brabant and Limburg, the principality of Liège, the Duchy of Cleves, the Duchy of Jülich and a large part of Belgian Brabant. It soon became involved in the collection and discounting of bills of exchange from clients and in exchanging foreign currency. In 1901, Van Lanschot Kempen was converted from a general partnership into a limited partnership under the name F. van Lanschot.

Prior to 1954, Van Lanschot Kempen's banking activities were carried out from its offices in ‘s-Hertogenbosch. After that, it progressively expanded its activities by opening additional offices, mostly, in the south of the Netherlands. In the early 1970s, it acquired a number of Dutch banks. During the 1980s, it opened a number of offices in the centre of the Netherlands, and, begging in 1991, it started an expansion strategy. In 1991, it also opened offices in Belgium.

In 1973, National Westminster Bank (NatWest) became the first non-family shareholder when it acquired a minority interest in the parent Van Lanschot's Beleggings-Compagnie. From the early 1990s, until it sold its interest in 1994, NatWest was the majority shareholder. In June 1999, Van Lanschot's equity securities were listed on Euronext Amsterdam.

In 2004, Van Lanschot Kempen acquired CenE Bankiers (financial services for the healthcare sector) in 2004 from ING Bank N.V.

In 2007, Van Lanschot Kempen acquired Kempen & Co. Kempen & Co was established in 1903 in Amsterdam by Arines Johannes Kempen with his companion Martinus Dirk de Lange as an independent stockbroker. The commodities exchange, the Beurs van Berlage had opened only a month before, and it was this exchange that was used by Kempen & Co for its trading. The company began by specialising in the trade of listed companies that operated in the Dutch East Indies.

In 2013, Van Lanschot Kempen launched Evi van Lanschot. Evi van Lanschot is an online savings and investment platform aimed at extending its offering to mass affluent clients and first-time investors.

In 2015, Van Lanschot Kempen acquired UK fiduciary management business of MN, a Dutch pensions and investments manager. In December 2016, Van Lanschot Kempen acquired the private banking business of Staalbankiers. In August 2017, Van Lanschot Kempen acquired UBS's Dutch wealth management business. In 2021, Van Lanschot Kempen acquired Hof Hoorneman Bankiers, a Dutch private bank.

In July 2025, ING Group finalised the acquisition of a 17.6% stake in Van Lanschot Kempen, thus bringing its totale share to 20.3%.

=== Mercier Van Lanschot ===
Mercier Van Lanschot was established in 2024 through the merger of Van Lanschot Belgium, established as Van Lanschot Kempen's Belgium presence in 1991, and Mercier Vanderlinden, which was established in 2000.

After the sale of the family participations in AnHyp (Antwerpse Hypotheekkas), Devos-Lemmens and Frisk, the Mercier and Vanderlinden families decided to entrust the management of their assets to Stéphane Mercier and Thomas Vanderlinden. Their objective was to protect and grow the purchasing power of family assets for future generations.

In July 2021, Van Lanschot Kempen acquired a 70% interest in Mercier Vanderlinden. In December 2022, Van Lanschot Kempen acquired the remaining 30% interest in Mercier Vanderlinden, at the time, with Mercier Vanderlinden becoming reference shareholders at Van Lanschot Kempen. In January 2024, Mercier Vanderlinden and Van Lanschot Belgium were rebranded Mercier Van Lanschot. Following the acquisition of Mercier Vanderlinden, its co-founder Thomas Vanderlinden became Chair of the Management Committee of Mercier Van Lanschot. In 2025, he joined the Management Board of Van Lanschot Kempen.

In 2023, Van Lanschot Kempen acquired wealth manager Accuro, after which its clients and employees moved to Mercier Van Lanschot.

In 2026, Mercier Van Lanschot won the 'Best for HNW' award at the Euromoney Private Banking Awards.

=== Leadership ===
From its origins in 1737 until the death of Jan Cees van Lanschot in 1991, a member of the Van Lanschot family was CEO of Van Lanschot Kempen. From 1991 to 2002 Bert Heemskerk was CEO. In 2002 he was succeeded by Floris Deckers. In 2013 Karl Guha became CEO. In 2021 Maarten Edixhoven became CEO.

=== Crest of the family and the firm Van Lanschot ===
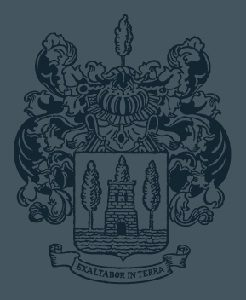
Van Lanschot family crest

Van Lanschot Kempen's crest is based on the crest that has been used by the Van Lanschot family since the seventeenth century. The Van Lanschot family appeared in Zundert in the fifteenth century. The name is derived from an elongated piece of land or 'long shot' located in the village of Achtmaal. Three green trees are depicted on a silver and green cover. In front of the middle tree, there is a red castle. The castle may be derived from the coat of arms of the Van Buerstede family. The crest's motto is: 'Exaltabor in terra'.

=== Het Lanschotje ===
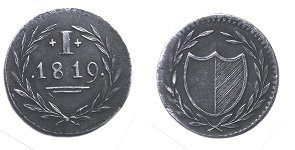
Front and back of the coin het Lanschotje

After the unification of the Netherlands with Belgium and the proclamation of the Kingdom of the Netherlands in 1815, a new regulation of the monetary system had to be established. The large monetisation project that was planned only commenced in 1821/1822. As a result, there was a shortage of small change coins. Several people, mostly traders, looked for a temporary solution (outside the government) to circulate small coins themselves. They ordered large quantities of copper coins from Germany and brought them to the Kingdom. The Utrecht grocer, Bleyenstein, was the first to introduce this to the market. These coins were also put into circulation by partner Franciscus van Lanschot. The coin was given various nicknames: het Lanschotje, het Bossche duit or Bleyensteinse duit.

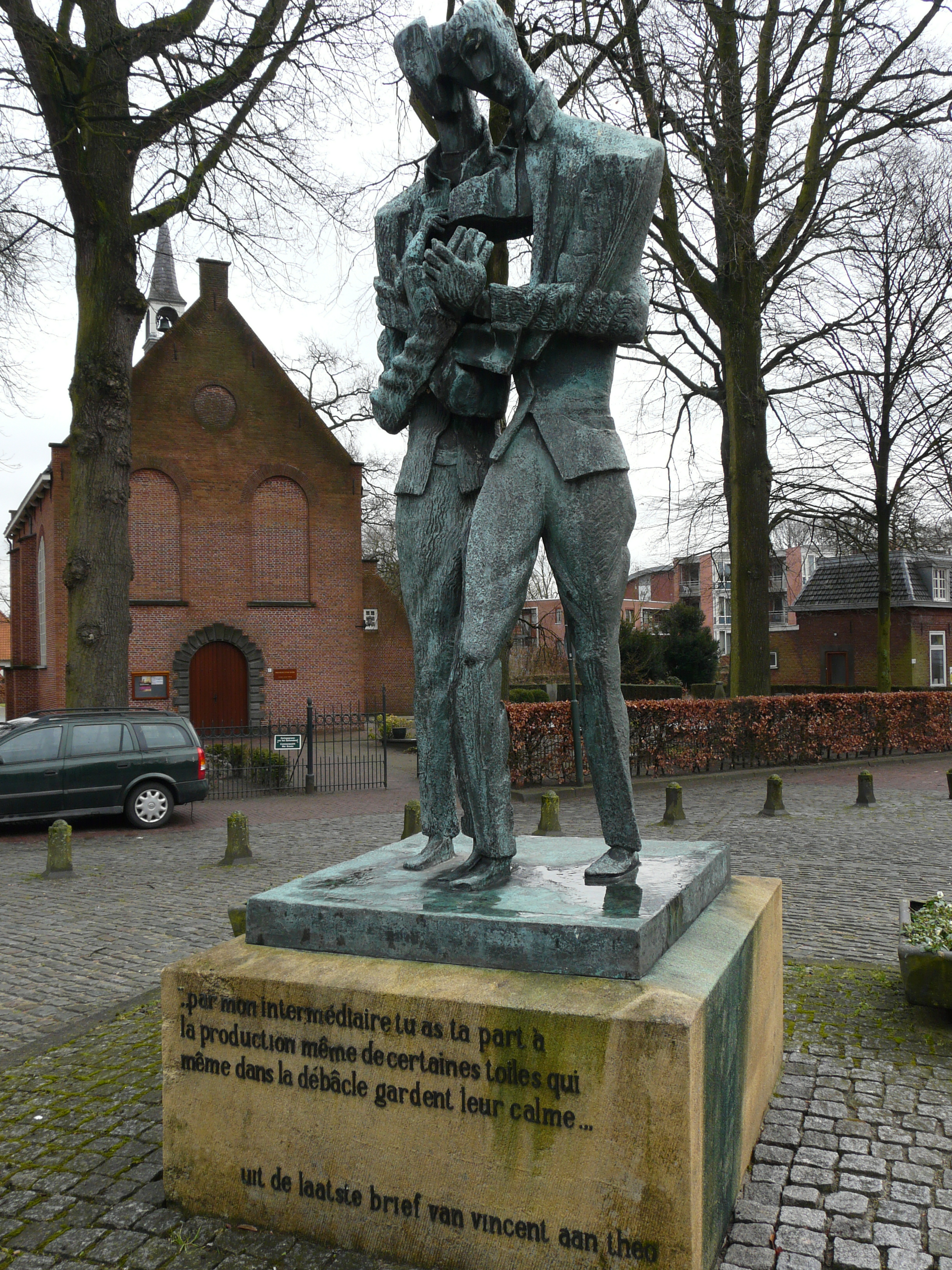
Statue of Vincent and Theo van Gogh in Zundert, a gift to the city from the bank to mark the 225th anniversary of its founding.

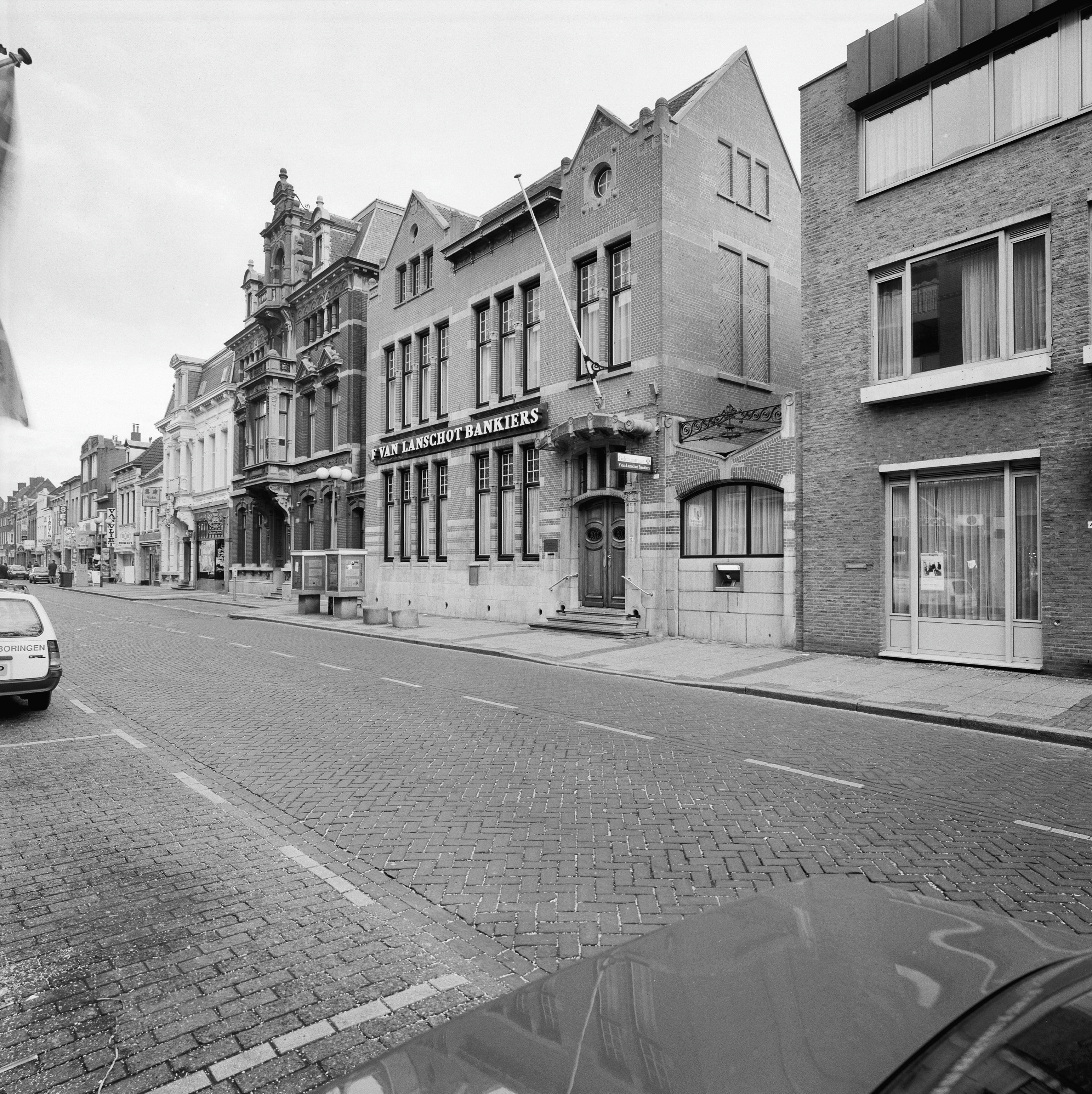
A Van Lanschot branch in Roosendaal (date unknown).

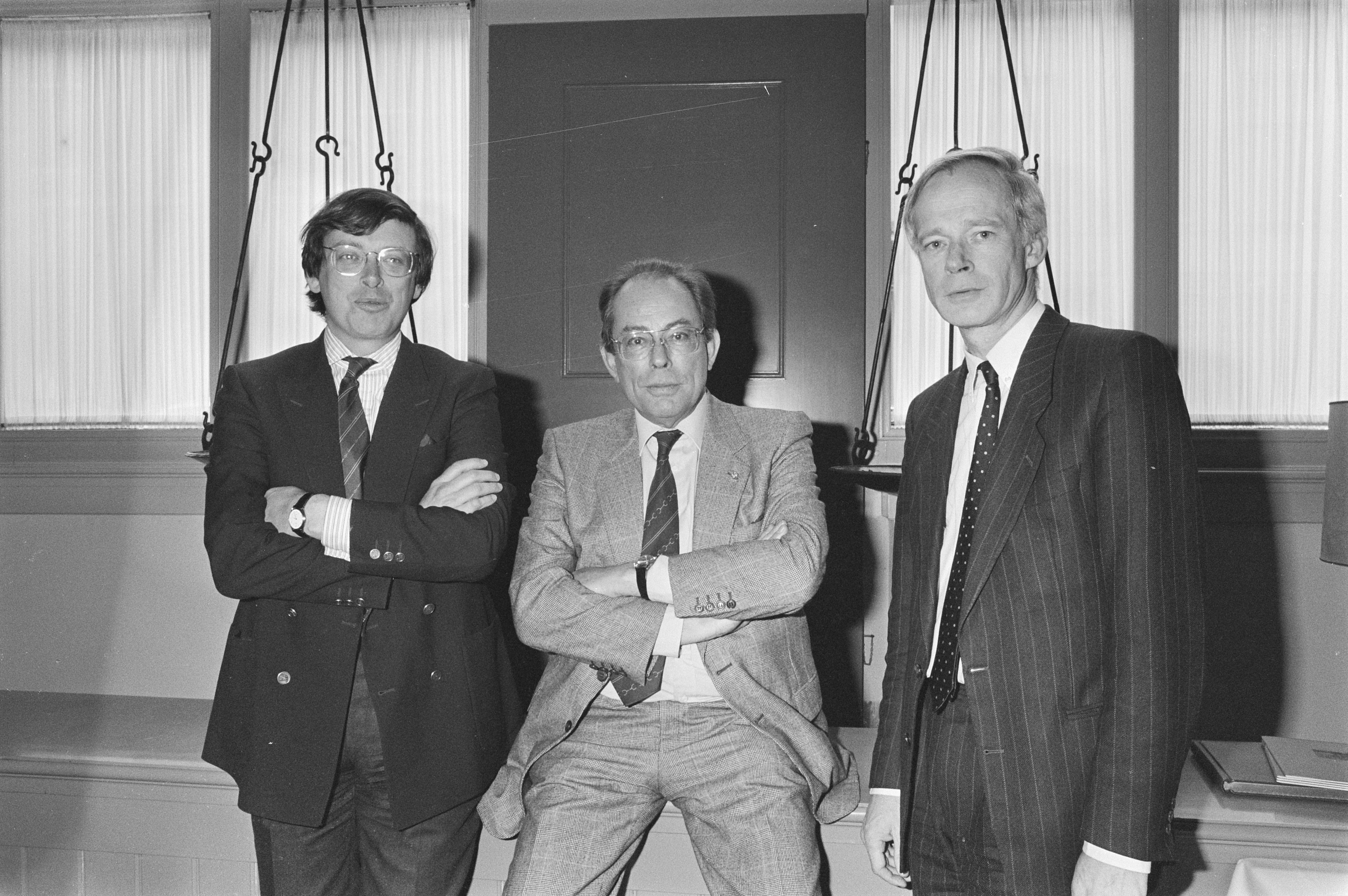
Photo of Van Lanschot bankers (1985) from the Dutch National Archives

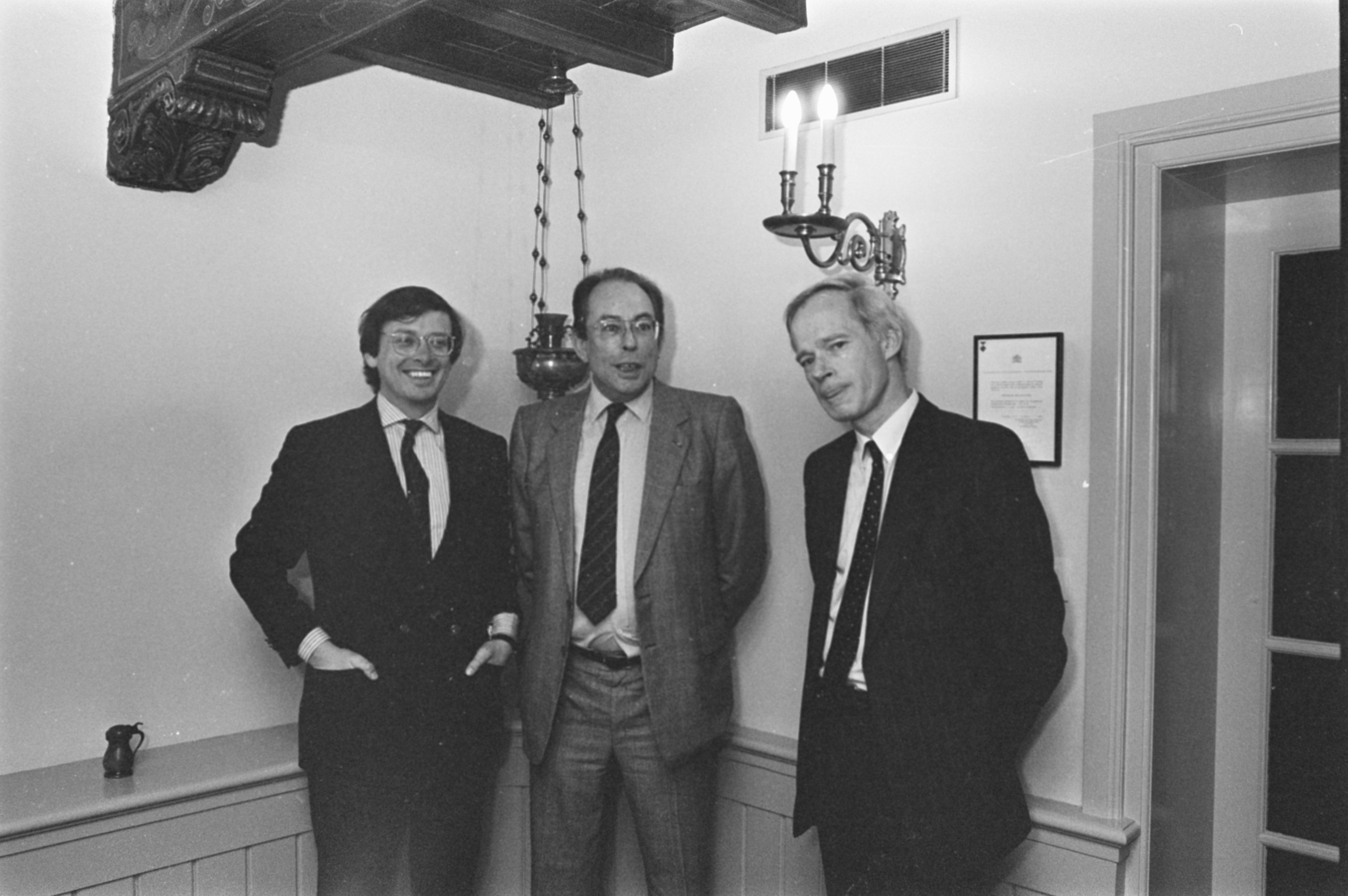
Photo of Van Lanschot bankers (1985) from the Dutch National Archives

== Offices ==
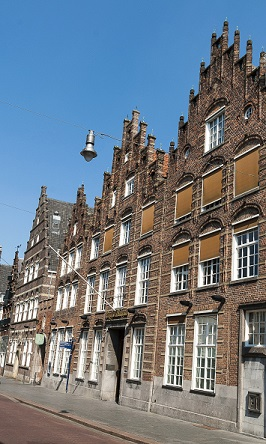
Head Office at Hooge Steenweg 29, 's-Hertogenbosch

Van Lanschot Kempen is headquartered in 's-Hertogenbosch, Hooge Steenweg 29. In addition, head office employees work in two other buildings in 's-Hertogenbosch in the Paleiskwartier district, and in the World Trade Center (Amsterdam).

Private Banking has offices and client reception locations in most large cities in the Netherlands and Belgium. Furthermore, Private Banking has an office in Zurich, Switzerland. Investment Management has offices in Amsterdam, London and Paris, and Investment Banking has offices in Amsterdam, Antwerp, and New York.

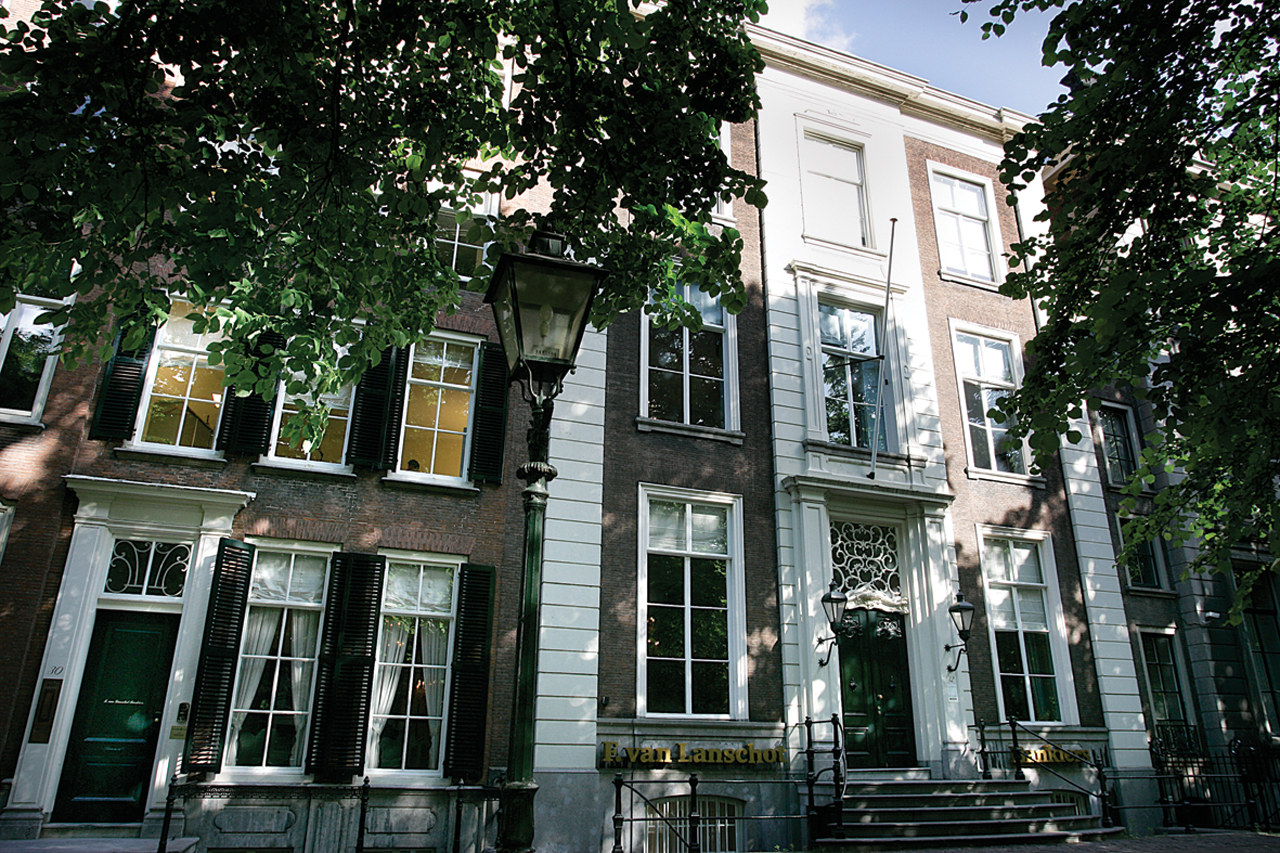
Office in The Hague

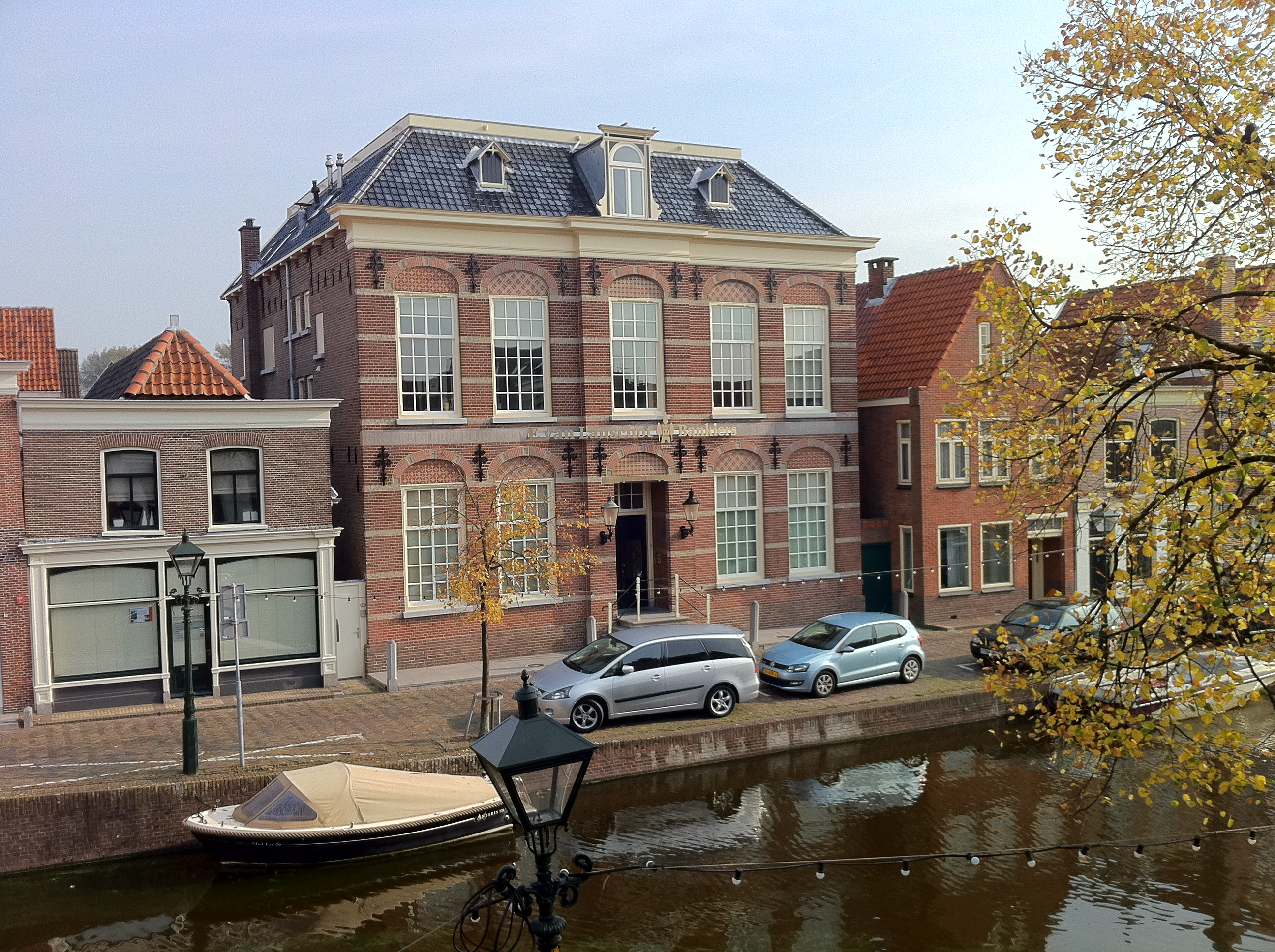
Office in Alkmaar

== Sponsorship ==
Van Lanschot Kempen's sponsorship aims to help preserve Dutch cultural heritage. It includes the Van Gogh Museum in Amsterdam. Furthermore, Van Lanschot Kempen is head sponsor of The Royal Concertgebouw in Amsterdam. The company also supports sustainability initiatives being the main partner of the Dutch foundation Stukje Natuur.

== See also ==
- List of oldest banks in continuous operation
- List of banks in the euro area
- List of banks in the Netherlands
