= Statue of Vincent and Theo van Gogh =

Statue in Zundert, Netherlands

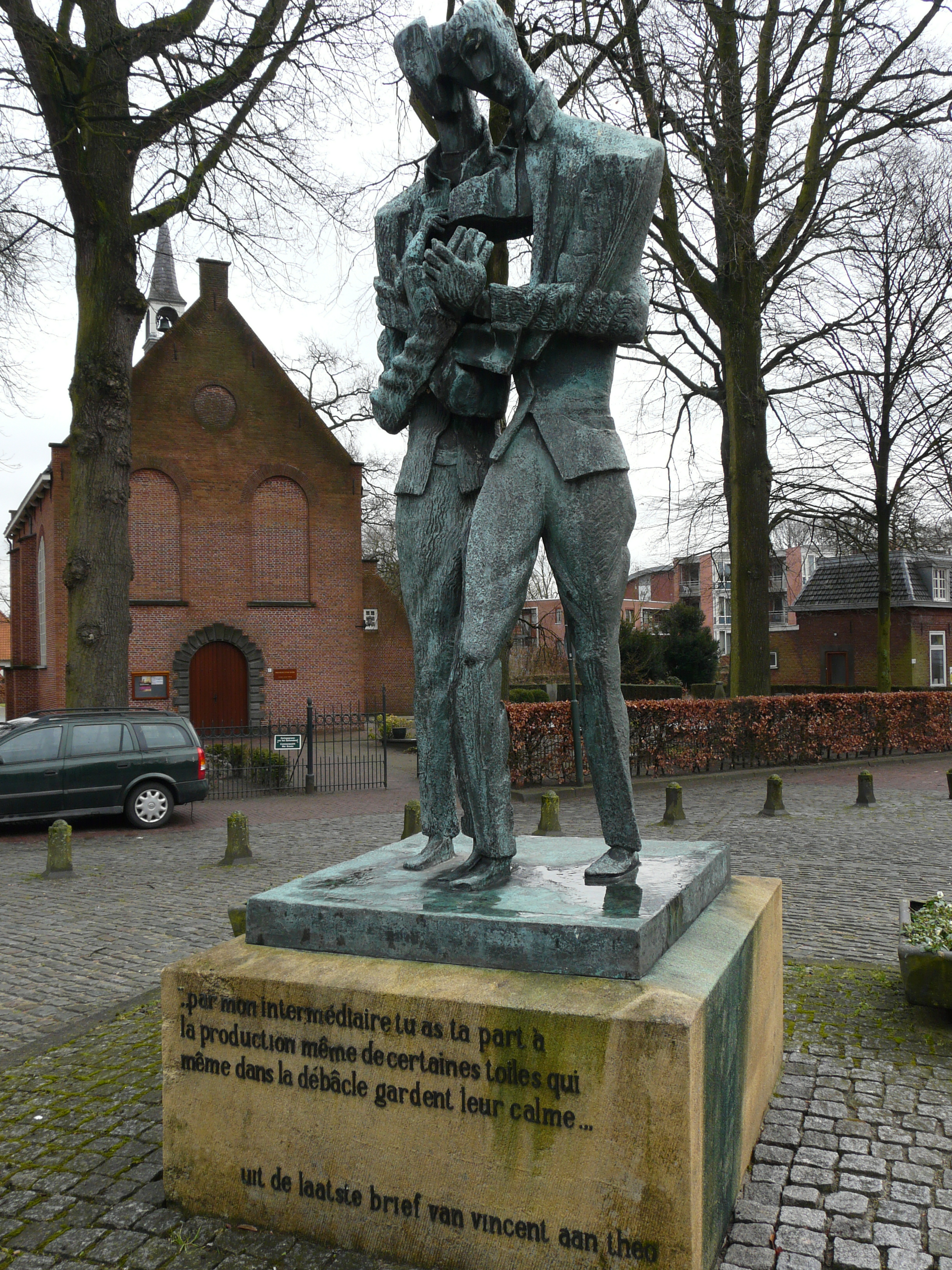
Statue of Vincent And Theo van Gogh, in Zundert in 2010

A statue of Vincent and Theo van Gogh by Ossip Zadkine stands on Vincent van Goghplein (Dutch:Vincent van Gogh square) in the town of Zundert in the Netherlands. It stands in front of the Van Gogh church and not far from the place where the brothers were born. The bronze statue was unveiled by Queen Juliana on 28 May 1964.

== Description ==
The statue is approximately 2.5 m (8.2 ft) tall. It depicts two men standing on a thick square bronze base plate, mounted on a low square stone plinth. The attenuated figures have similar modelling to Zadkine's statue De verwoeste stad ("The devastated city") in Rotterdam. The figures stand close together, intertwined, holding hands and leaning their heads together, although neither figure closely resembles the person it is intended to represent.

The 0.5 m (1 ft 8 in) high light coloured stone plinth comes from Saint-Rémy-de-Provence in the south of France, where Vincent van Gogh resided for a year, and was donated by the municipal council of the French town. It contains a tube with soil from the garden of the hospital at the monastery of Saint-Paul-de-Mausole, where Vincent was treated for his mental health condition.

The plinth has weathered from white to a dirty yellow, stained by verdigris leached from the bronze sculpture. The front is inscribed with a quotation in French from one of the last letters written by Vincent to Theo van Gogh, dated 23 July 1890. This letter remained unfinished and unsent at the time of Vincent's death; he had it with him when he shot himself on 27 July, causing wounds that ultimately led to his death two days later:

par mon intermédiaire tu as ta part à
la production même de certaines toiles qui
même dans la debâcle gardent leur calme
uit de laatste brief van vincent aan theo

The words can be liberally translated to English as

through my deeds you have witnessed
the creation of several paintings which
will breathe tranquillity even in times of upheaval
from the last letter from vincent to theo

== Reception ==
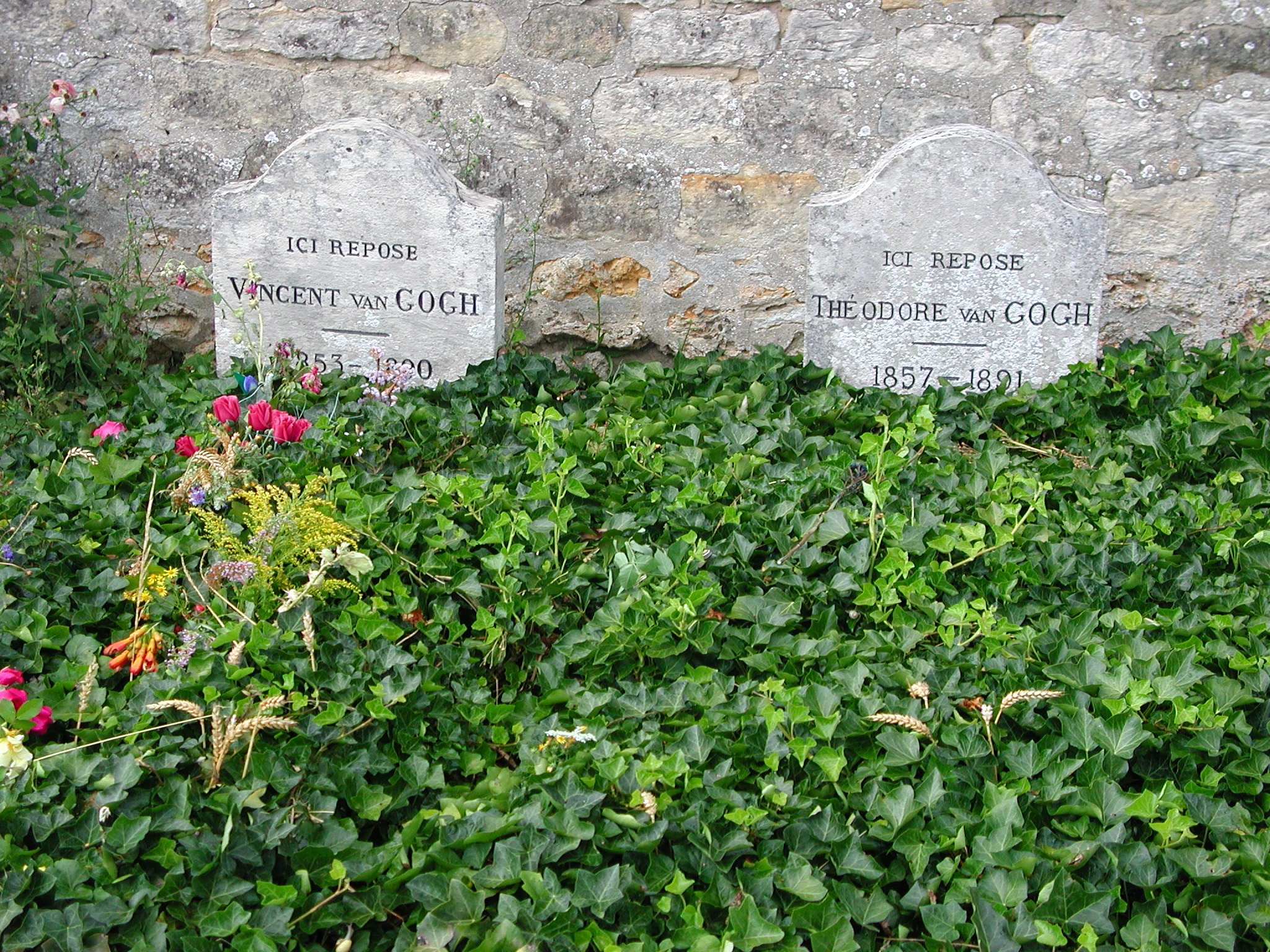
The graves of Vincent and Theo van Gogh, beside each other, in Auvers-sur-Oise

The statue was a gift from Van Lanschot Bankiers, to mark the 225th anniversary of the founding of the bank in 1737. The Van Lanschot family were also originally from Zundert. The Van Gogh brothers were born nearby, Vincent in 1853 and Theo in 1857. The house where they were born has since been demolished, but there is now a museum at the Van Gogh House on the site. Their father Theodorus van Gogh was a Dutch Reformed church pastor who preached at the Van Gogh church on the square.

Zadkine was commissioned to make the sculpture in 1963. He made at least four sculptures and busts of Vincent van Gogh between 1955 and 1964, including a statue of Vincent standing alone unveiled in 1961 in Auvers-sur-Oise, near Paris, where Vincent died in 1890 and where both brothers are buried in adjacent plots, and a bust of Vincent for the asylum at Saint-Rémy-de-Provence.

In his earlier work, Zadkine had discussed the relationship of Vincent with his brother with Van Gogh expert Mark Tralbaut, and an initial design had the two men seated, but Zadkine quickly abandoned that concept; within a matter of days after the commission was granted, he worked up a plaster model of the men standing together. He presented the model to journalists in Zundert on 14 May 1963.

The bronze sculpture was cast at the Susse Frères foundry in Paris. It bears the inscriptions "O Zadkine 1963" and "Susse Fondeur Paris". It was unveiled by Queen Juliana on 28 May 1964, in the presence of Zadkine, Mark Tralbaut, and the Mayor of Zundert, GJA Manders. Zadkine published a book describing the work, and a commemorative medal was made by Begeer.
