= De Akkermolen =

Dutch monumental windmill

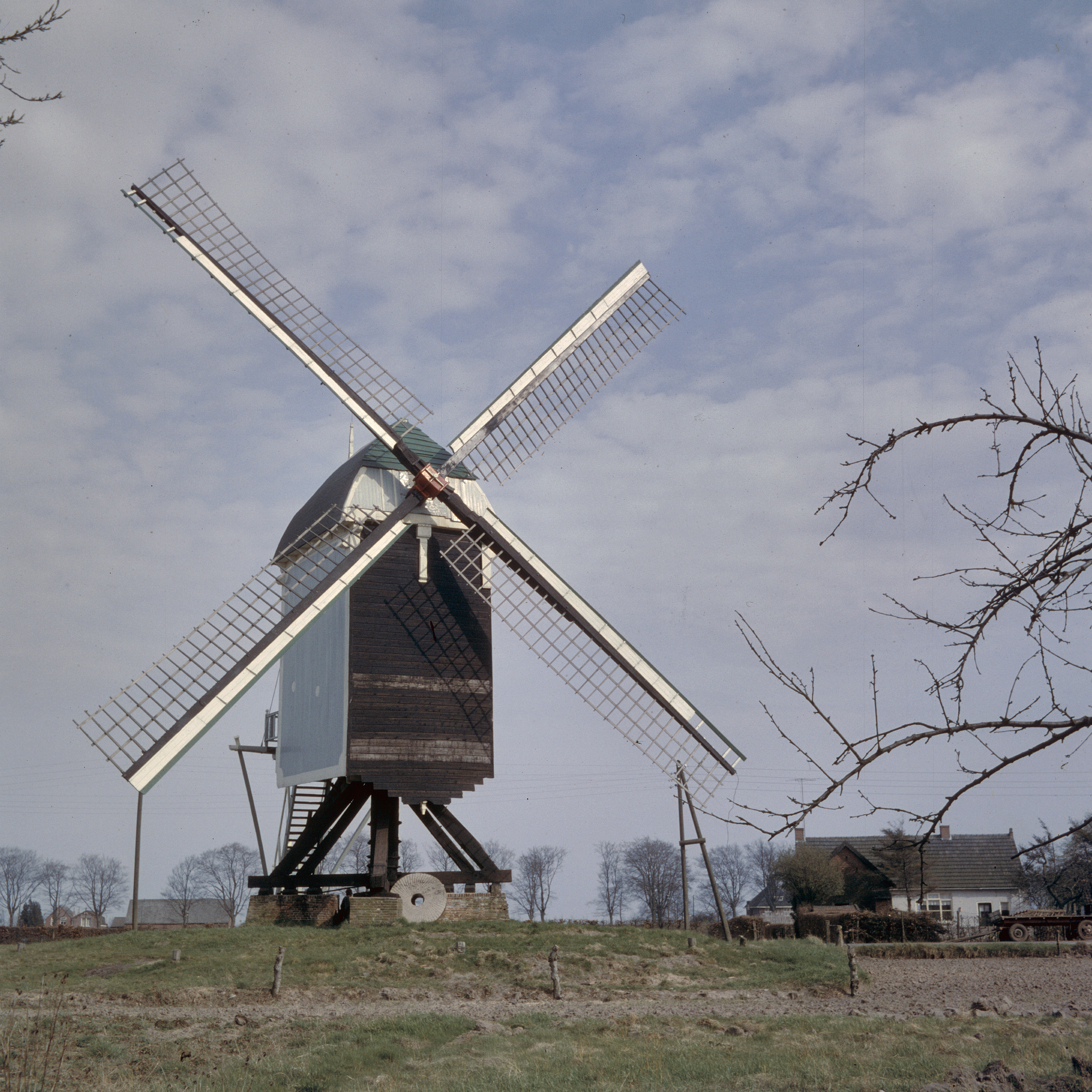
- Front view of the mill, 1964

Origin
- Mill name: De Akkermolen; English: The Field Mill
- Mill location: Akkermolenweg 13; Zundert, Netherlands
- Coordinates: 51.478853°N 4.66715°E
- Operator(s): Municipality of Zundert
- Year built: c. 1605

Information
- Purpose: Gristmill
- Type: Open trestle post mill
- No. of sails: Four
- Type of sails: Common sails
- Windshaft: Wood
- Winding: Tailpole
- No. of pairs of millstones: One
- Size of millstones: 1.50 metres (4 ft 11 in)
- Other information: Rijksmonument (41113)

De Akkermolen (Dutch pronunciation: [də ˈʔɑkərmoːlə(n)]; English: The Field Mill) is a 17th-century windmill in Zundert, Netherlands. Built around 1605 to replace an earlier windmill, it was used as a gristmill until it was severely damaged in 1950. The mill was bought by the local government and restored in 1961, and it was listed as a national heritage site in 1974.

== History ==
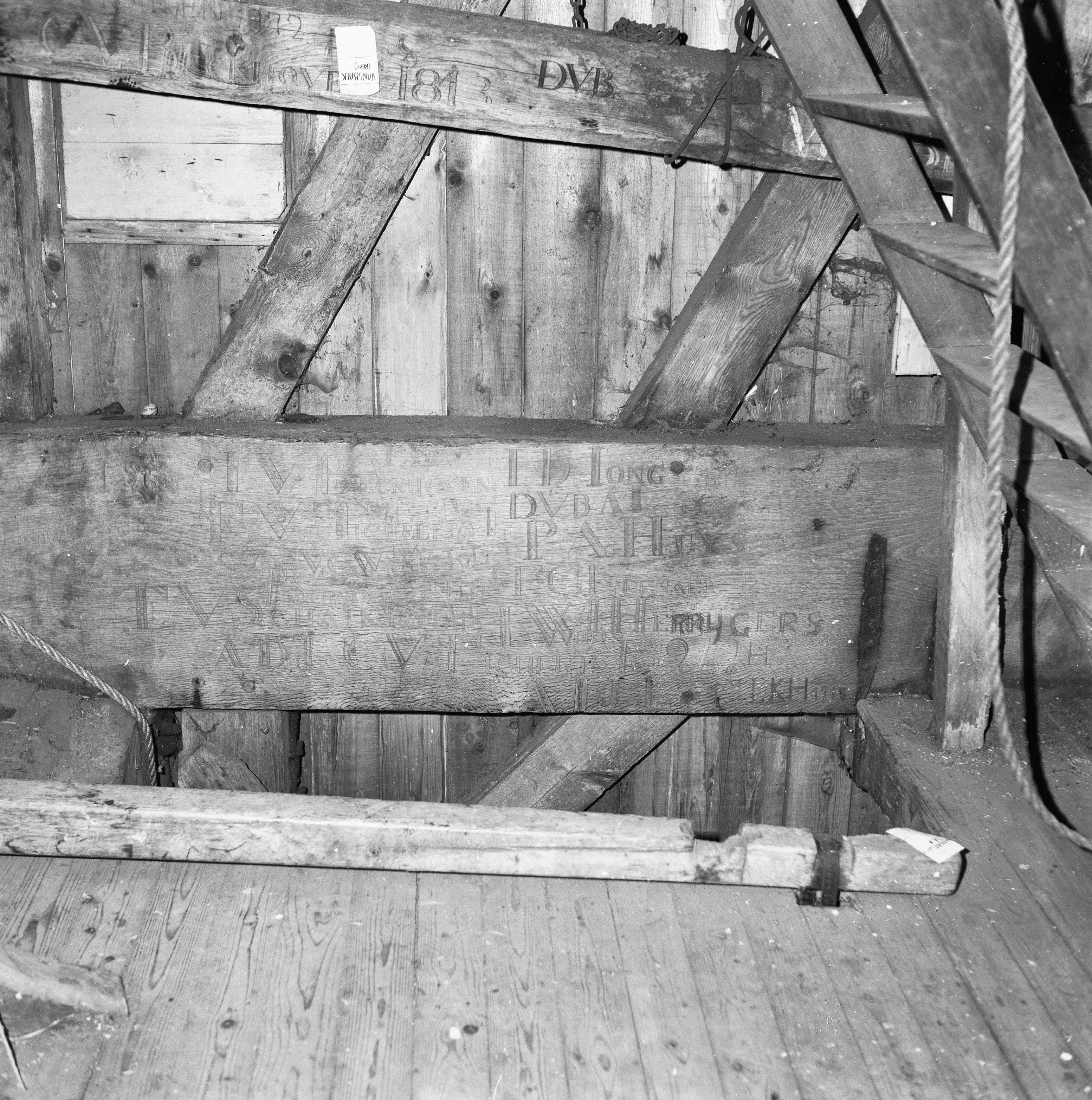
Inscriptions from 1804

An earlier windmill had existed on the same location and was mentioned in 1557 as "the mill in the Sundertsch Field" (de molen in de Sundertsche Akker), and this earlier windmill was in its turn a replacement of a nearby watermill, De Poelmolen, which was mentioned in 1438. The earlier windmill was destroyed in 1584 by Spanish troops and the building of a new mill took several years. The new windmill was first mentioned in 1605.

The mill was owned by the margrave of Bergen op Zoom and was a banmolen (nl), meaning peasants in the locality were obligated to use this mill to grind their wheat. In 1794 it became property of William V, Prince of Orange and baron of Breda. Banmolens were taken out of common law during the French revolution, meaning that people could choose where they wanted to grind their wheat, and in 1830 the mill became private property. The mill was in constant use as a gristmill until the wooden windshaft broke in 1950, which caused the sails to crash into the ground, making the future of the mill uncertain. The mill was bought in 1959 by the municipal government of Zundert and restored in 1961. It ceased to be an active gristmill, but was in functioning order. The mill needed another restoration in 1991 when it was taken apart and rebuilt.

== Description ==
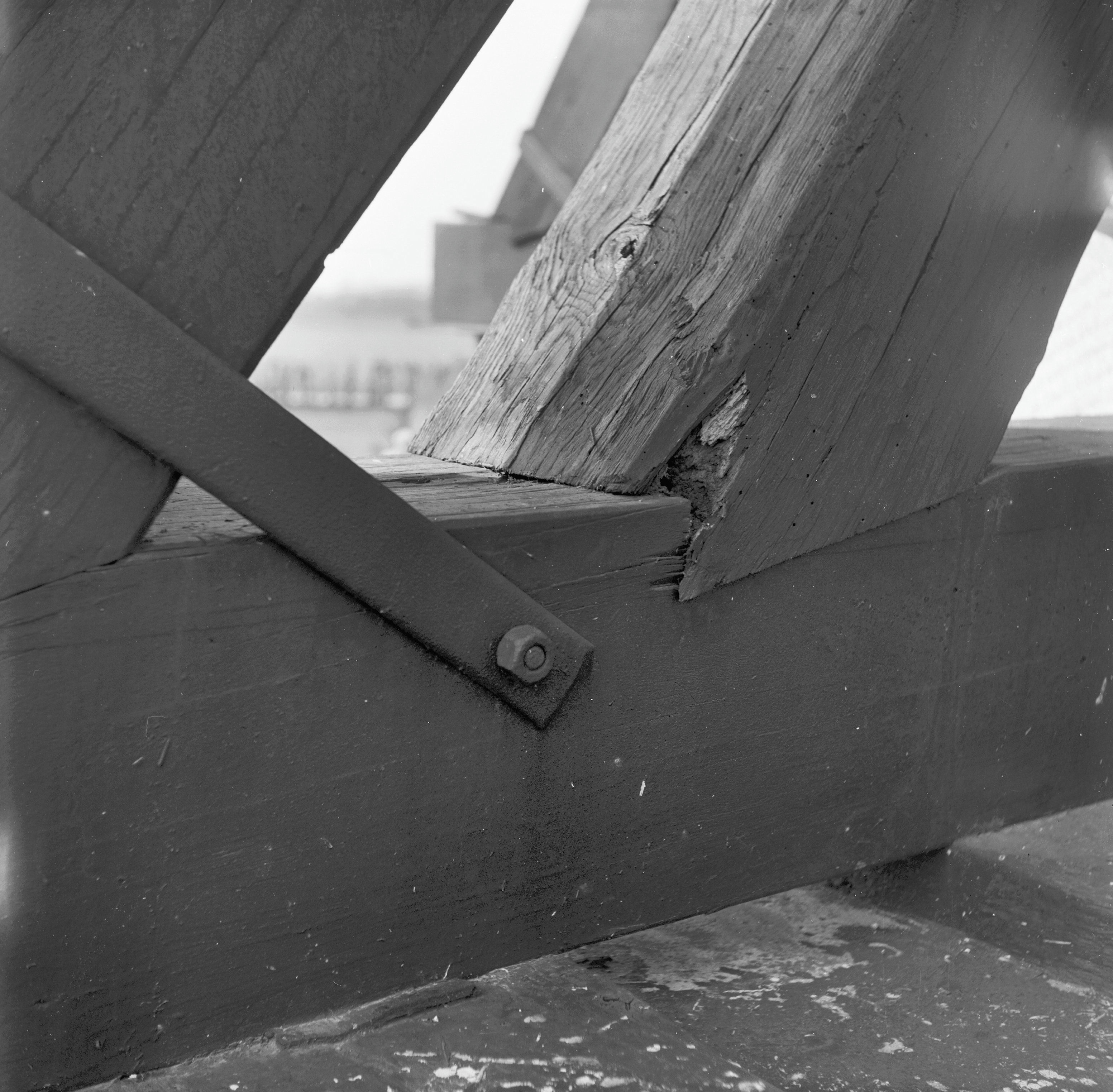
"Kruisplaat", the junction of the crosstree and double quarterbars.

De Akkermolen was built as an open trestle post mill, meaning that the whole body of the mill that houses the machinery is mounted on an uncovered single vertical post or trestle, around which it can be rotated to bring the sails into the wind. The mill is made out of painted wood, the body is partially covered in tar and it has a roof of bituminous waterproofing. The mill has four common sails of 23.00 metres (75 ft 6 in) span, that drive a wheel of 71 cogs, driving the lantern pinion stone nut, which has 15 staves. The stone nut drives a pair of Cullen millstones from Mayen ("Cullen" for "Cologne", where such millstones were marketed from), 17 hands in diameter or 1.50 metres (4 ft 11 in).

Inside the mill inscriptions can be found by the miller and his assistants from 1804.

The mill was listed as a national heritage site (nr 41113) on 11 July 1974. It is open to the public on the first Saturday of the month or by appointment.
