= Van Lanschot (family) =

van Lanschot
- family
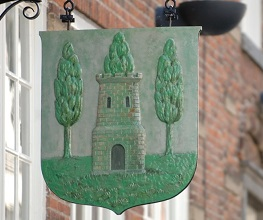
- Country: Netherlands
- Founded: 15th century
- Founder: Christiaen Jan Maessone

Van Lanschot is the name of a Dutch patrician family.

Christiaen Jan Maessone who lived in Zundert at the end of the 15th century is the earliest known member of the family. The family was involved in different industries such as banking, brick-making and brewing. In 1737, the family founded the Van Lanschot Bankiers. Some members lived on the castle and estate Zwijnsbergen in Helvoirt.

== Notable members ==
- Cornelis van Lanschot (1699-1757), was a Dutch banker and founder of the bank Van Lanschot
- Franciscus van Lanschot(1768-1851), was a Dutch entrepreneur and banker
- Frans Johan van Lanschot (1875-1949), was a Dutch jurist and Mayor of 's-Hertogenbosch
- Cees van Lanschot (1897-1953), was a Dutch banker
- Willem van Lanschot (1914-2001), was a Dutch banker. He was married to Jonkvrouw Louise Marie van Meeuwen
- Antoinette Sandbach (1969-present) is a British politician and the Member of Parliament for Eddisbury. She is a daughter to Anne Marie Antoinette of the Dutch Van Lanschot family
- Reinier van Lanschot (1989-present) is a Dutch politician and Member of European Parliament for Volt Europa, a European political alliance, elected in the Netherlands in 2024

== Literature ==
- Nederland's Patriciaat 80 (1997), pp. 182–227.
