= Achtmaal =

- Village
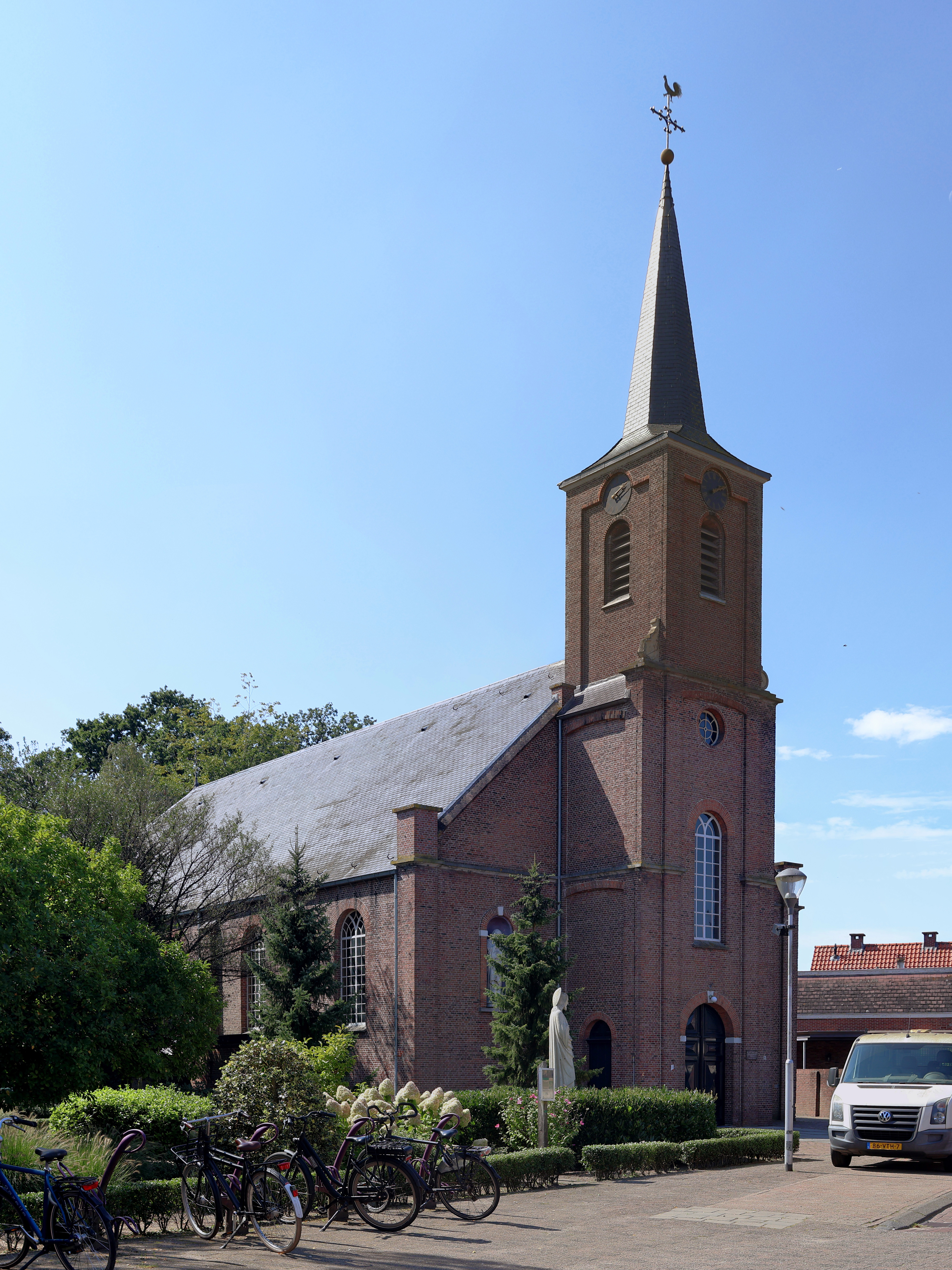
- St Cornelius Church

- Location in the province of North Brabant in the Netherlands Achtmaal (Netherlands)
- Coordinates: 51°27′9″N 4°34′55″E
- Country: Netherlands
- Province: North Brabant
- Municipality: Zundert

Area
  - Total: 27.06 km^{2} (10.45 sq mi)
- Elevation: 13 m (43 ft)

Population (2021)
  - Total: 1,625
  - Density: 60.05/km^{2} (155.5/sq mi)
- Time zone: UTC+1 (CET)
  - Summer (DST): UTC+2 (CEST)
- Postal code: 4885
- Dialing code: 076

Achtmaal is a village the south of the Netherlands. It is located in Zundert, North Brabant, near the border with Belgium.

== History ==
The village was first mentioned in 1294 as "Gilberti de Achtmale", and is a combination of "reserved forest" and "court of justice".

Achtmaal was home to 100 people in 1840. The St Cornelius Church was built in 1863.

During World War II, the United States Army 104th Infantry Division, 415th Infantry Regiment, liberated Achtmaal from German troops. Operation Pheasant (code-name "Suitcase"), aimed at clearing German troops from the province of North Brabant, started on the morning of Friday 20 October 1944 just after 7:00am. On 27 October 1944 the 3rd Battalion of the 415th Infantry entered the village and Lieutenant Colonel Kelleher was handed papers by the Dutch resistance. They proved to be very helpful for the liberators. The Regiment sustained thirty-seven killed and 135 wounded during the operation.
