= Zundert =

- Municipality
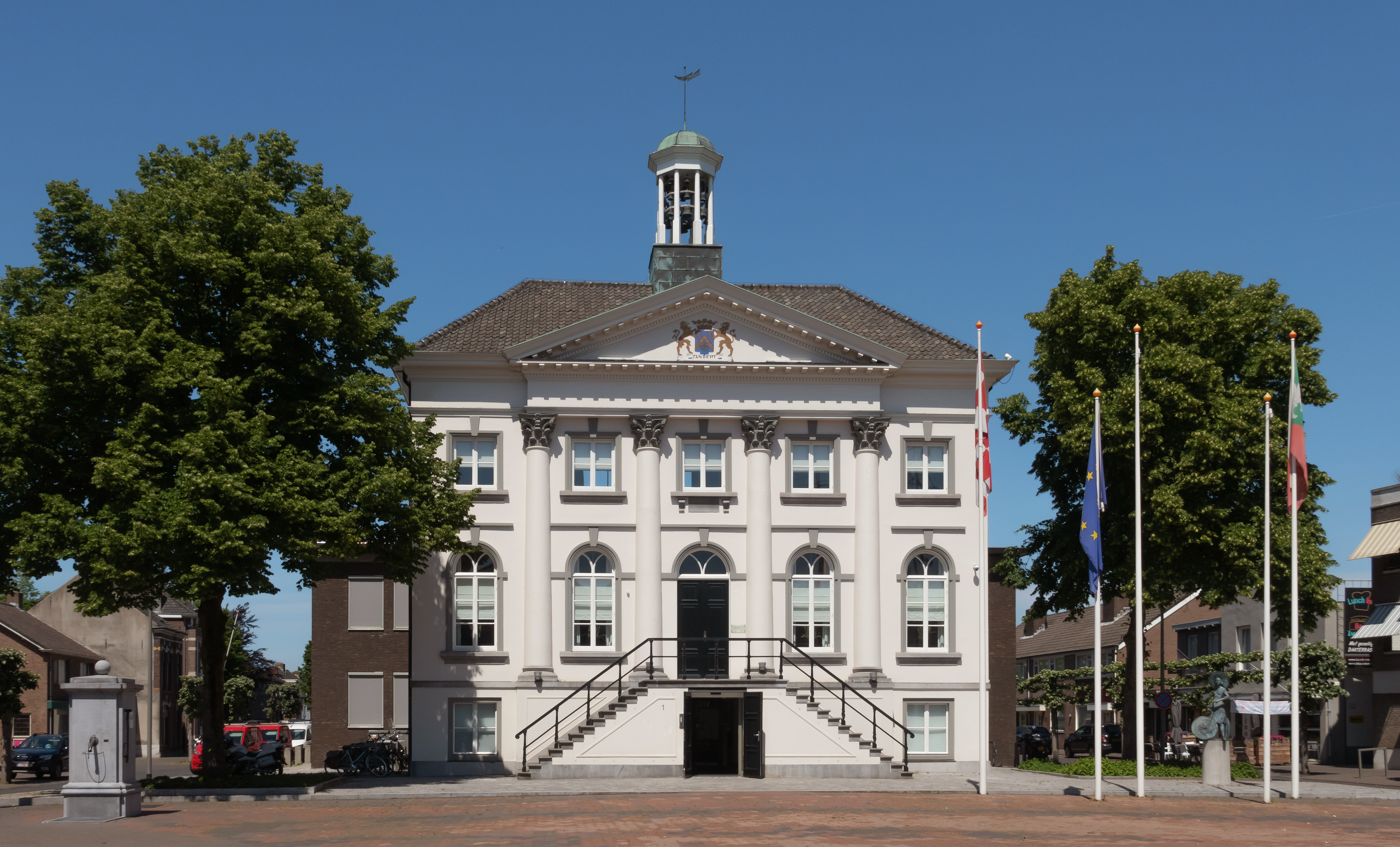
- Zundert city hall in 2021

- Flag Coat of arms

- Location in North Brabant
- Coordinates: 51°28′N 4°40′E
- Country: Netherlands
- Province: North Brabant

Government
  - Body: Municipal council
  - Mayor: Joyce Vermue (Labour Party)

Area
  - Total: 121.21 km^{2} (46.80 sq mi)
  - Land: 120.65 km^{2} (46.58 sq mi)
  - Water: 0.56 km^{2} (0.22 sq mi)
- Elevation: 12 m (39 ft)

Population (January 2021)
  - Total: 21,988
  - Density: 182/km^{2} (470/sq mi)
- Demonym(s): Zundertenaar, Zundernaar
- Time zone: UTC+1 (CET)
  - Summer (DST): UTC+2 (CEST)
- Postcode: 4880–4891
- Area code: 076
- Website: www.zundert.nl

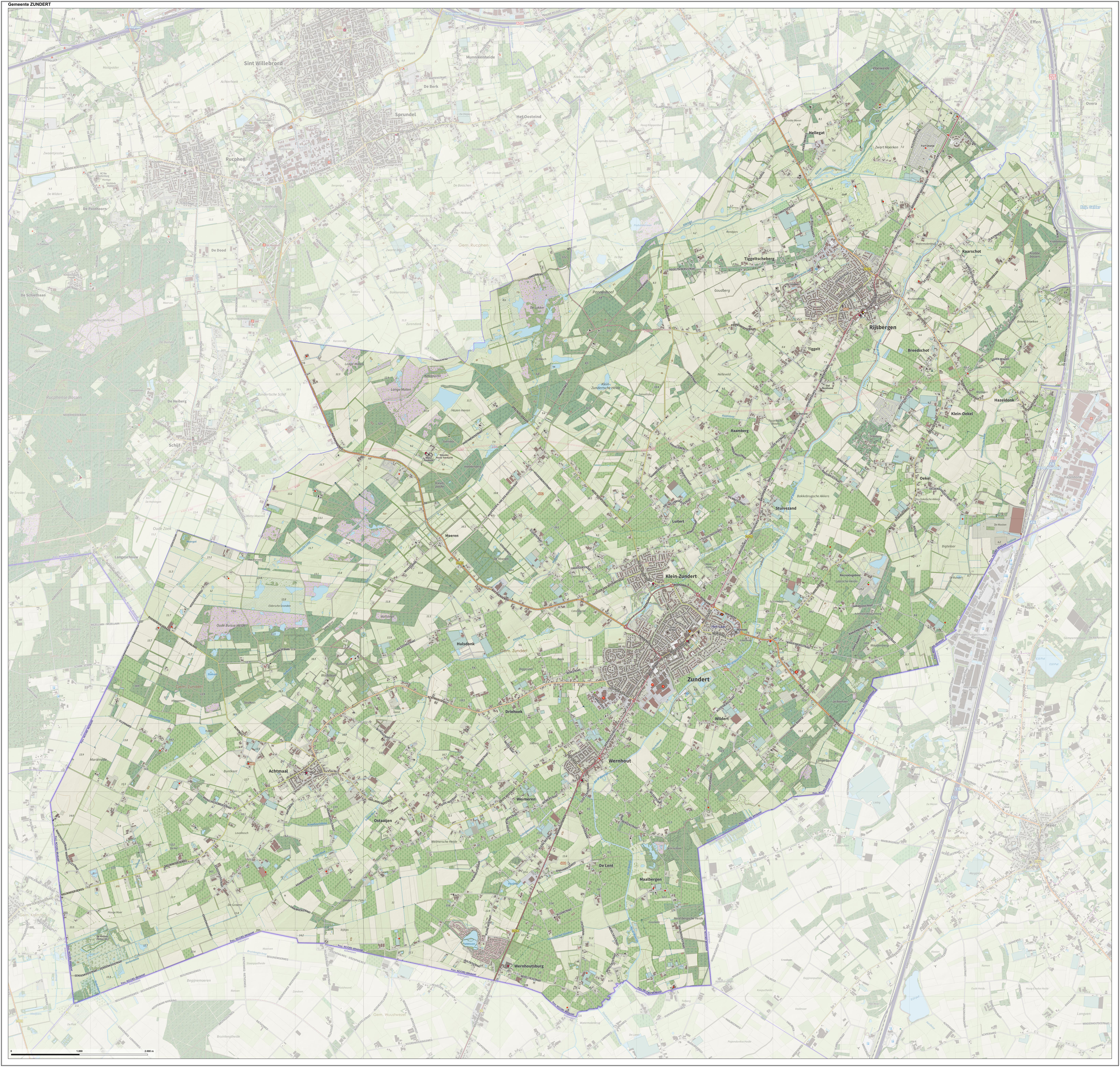
Topographic map of Zundert, Sept. 2014

Zundert (Dutch pronunciation: [ˈzʏndərt]) is a municipality and town in the south of the Netherlands bordering Belgium, in the province of North Brabant.

Zundert is the birthplace of Post-Impressionist painter Vincent van Gogh.

== History ==
The name of Zundert is first mentioned in a certificate dating from 1157, in which the Bishop of Liege confirms a donation from the place "Sunderda". This Sunderda actually relates to the current settlement of Klein-Zundert (Dutch for Small Zundert), one of the first settlements in the area. The local monks, besides their religious labour, were also involved in clearing the land, that was still rough territory, filled with swamps, peats and heath fields. The monks also assisted in improving agricultural methods.

Zundert is still surrounded by a rural environment with nature areas, one of them is the "Buissche Heide", a heath area used for recreation and walking. The Kalmthoutse Heide, across the border with Belgium, is also in the vicinity.

During the Second World War Zundert, Achtmaal, Wernhout and Klein-Zundert were liberated during the allied offensive Operation Pheasant on 27 October, Rijsbergen on 28 October. Achtmaal was liberated by the 415th Infantry Regiment of the US 104th (Timberwolf) Infantry Division, Zundert and Klein-Zundert by the 413th Infantry Regiment of the 104th (Timberwolf) Infantry Division, and Wernhout and Rijsbergen by the 414th Infantry Regiment of the 104th (Timberwolf) Infantry Division.

At a small distance from the town, an old tavern called "In Den Anker" can be found, which has the oldest license in the Netherlands. It originally dates from 1635, but was rebuilt in 1913.

== Geography ==
The municipality of Zundert contains the following places:

- Zundert (town)
- Rijsbergen
- Klein-Zundert
- Wernhout
- Achtmaal

Zundert lies about 12 metres (39 ft) above Dutch sea level (NAP), and is located 15 kilometres (9.3 mi) south-west of the city of Breda, and 35 kilometres (22 mi) north-east of Antwerp, Belgium. Zundert is surrounded by the municipalities Etten-Leur and Breda on the north, Hoogstraten (Belgium) on the east, Wuustwezel (Belgium) on the south, Kalmthout (Belgium) on the southwest, and Essen (Belgium) and Rucphen on the west.

Zundert is one of the most agricultural municipalities of the Netherlands. 10% of all nursery production of the Netherlands is around Zundert. Production of strawberries and young field grown trees and hedging plants is very important in the area.

== Architecture ==
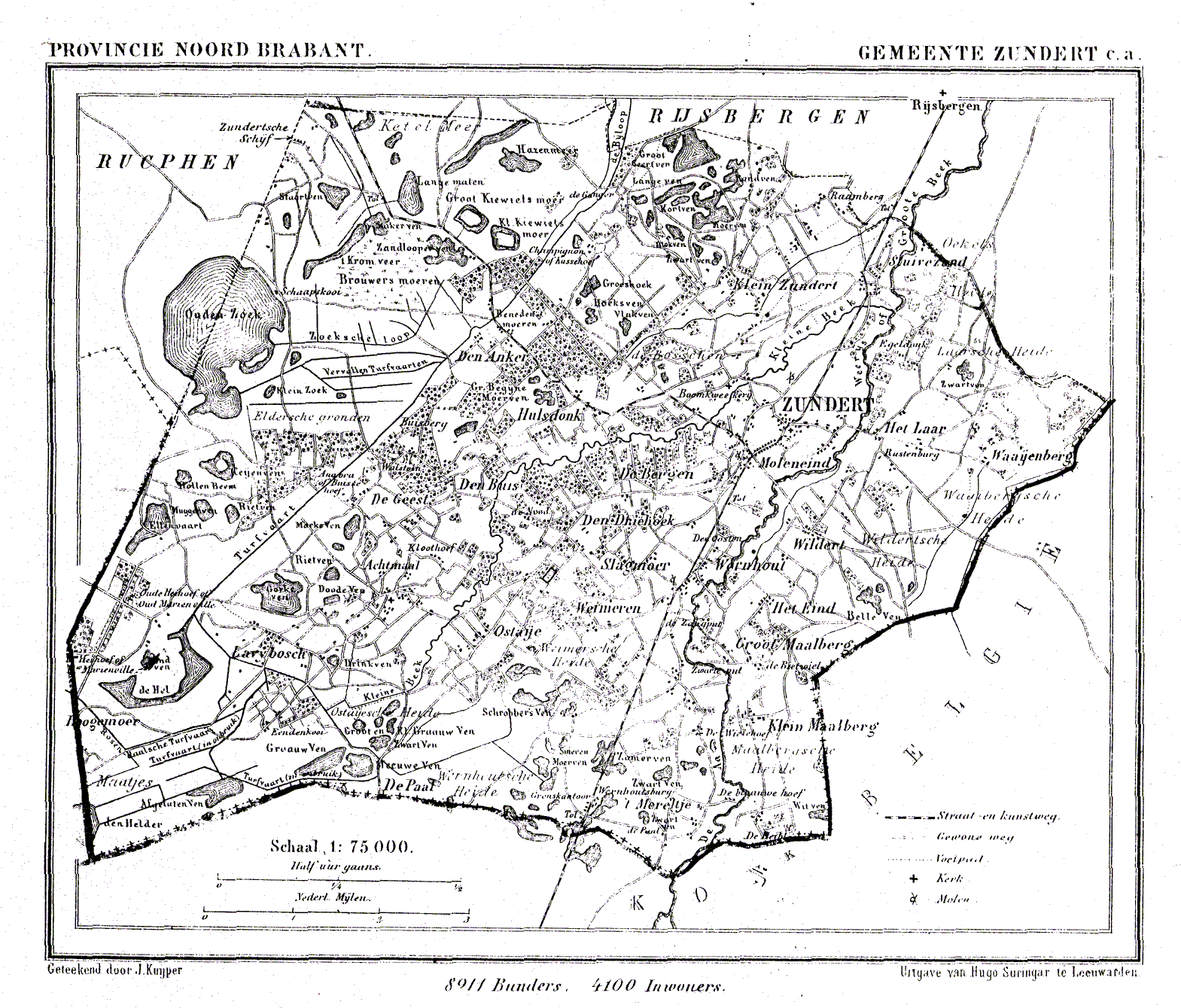
Zundert in 1865

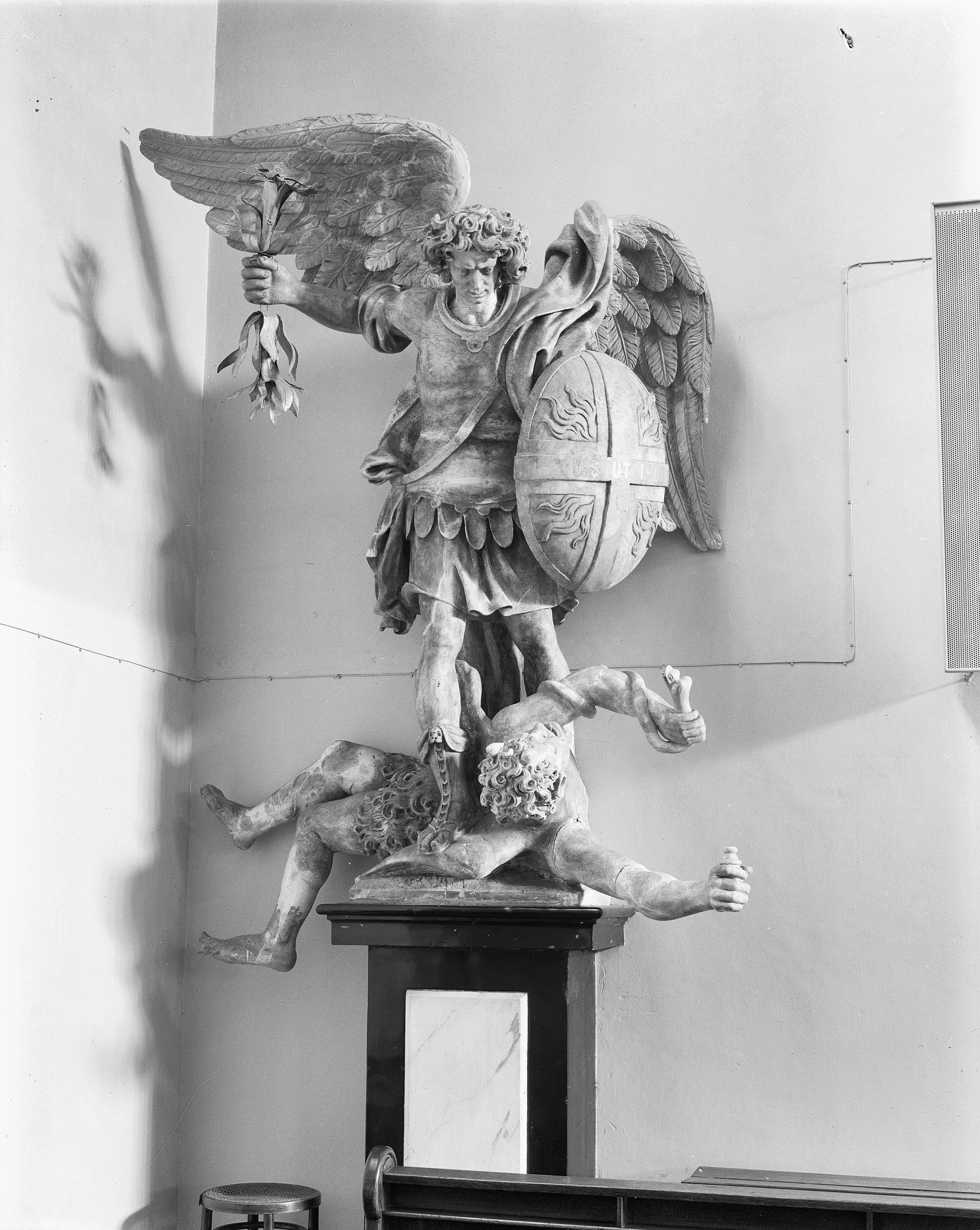
Statue of Saint Michael (archangel) made by Peter Paul Rubens, located in the Roman Catholic St. Trudo Church in Zundert.

The Roman Catholic church of Zundert, dedicated to Saint Trudo, was built in 1927, and contains art treasures from the 17th century, coming from the St. Michielsabdij in Antwerp, including an original sculpture made by Flemish artist Peter Paul Rubens. These treasures consist of marble altar tables, three Alabaster sculptures, several paintings and two carved oaken confessionals. The church itself was designed by Jan Stuyt, a pupil of the architect Pierre Cuypers. Stuyt also designed the church of nearby Klein-Zundert in the same municipality.

The town hall of Zundert was built in 1830 in neoclassical style and demolished and rebuilt in the same style in 1965.

The Netherlands' first female architect, Margaret Staal-Kropholler, built a studio in 1919 for visual artist Richard Roland Holst and his wife, poet and politician Henriëtte Roland Holst-van der Schalk on the Buissche Heide. The studio was built in the style of the Amsterdam School.

=== Windmills ===
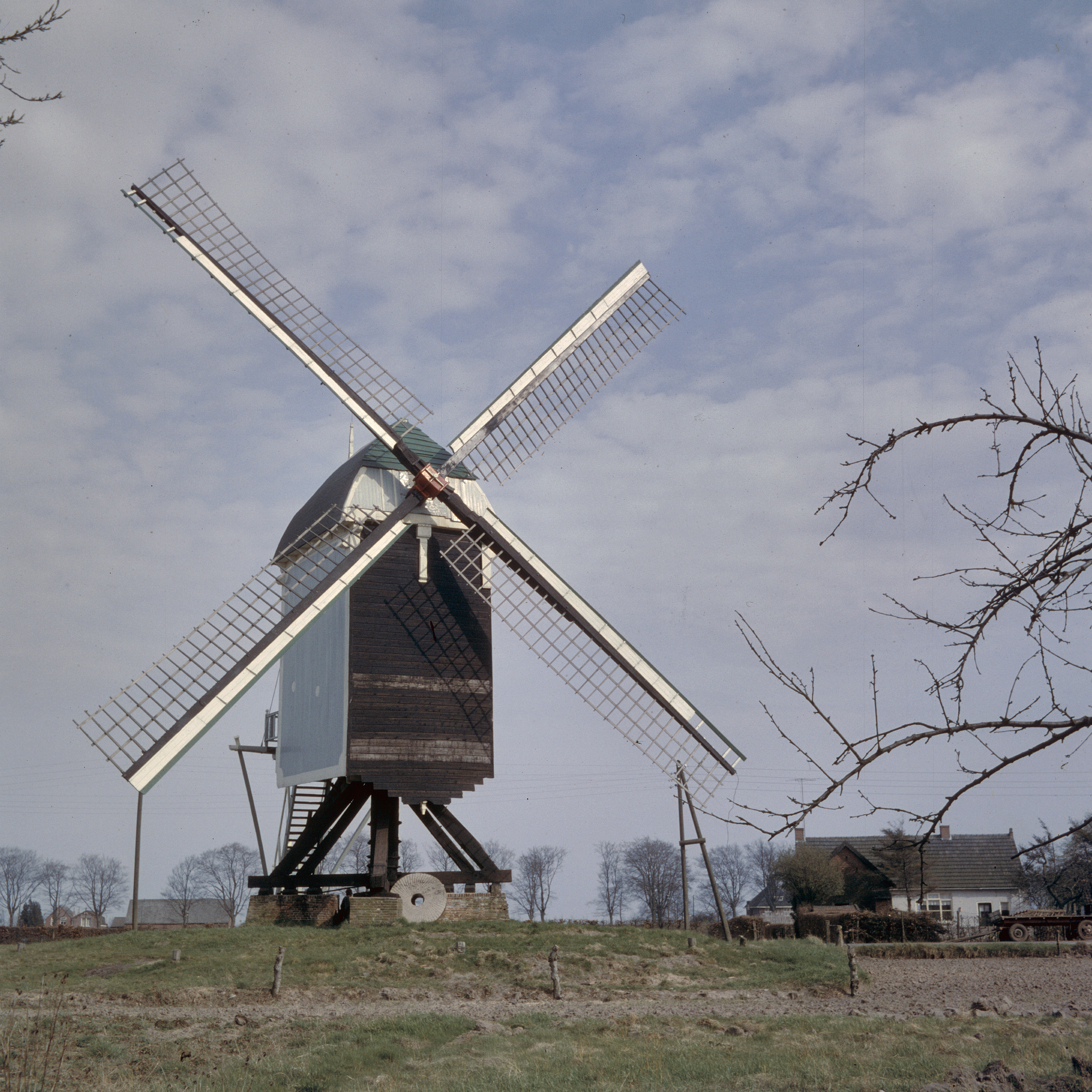
De Akkermolen te Zundert

Zundert is the home of a 17th-century windmill, called 'De Akkermolen' (The Croftmill). It is said to have been originally built in 1652. It is a standard mill, and it was built to process grain.

The mill had numerous private owners in the past, including stadtholder Willem V, as the Baron of Breda, who became owner in 1794. In the early 1900s the mill was owned by Wilhelmus van der Stappen.

The mill was heavily damaged in 1950, and its existence was threatened several occasions after that. The Akkermolen is currently owned by the municipality of Zundert, which bought it in 1959, the last private owners being the Herijgers family. After the mill was taken over by Zundert, it needed serious restoration, which took place in 1961. Another restoration took place in 1991, but then, the entire mill needed to be taken apart and restored.

The Akkermolen can be visited, after arranging an appointment at Akkermolenweg 15.

The town had other mills in the past, one of them was a stone-mill called "De Eendracht", which stood on Moleneind, currently known as Poteind. It burned down on 23 January 1909. The owner at the time, Jaak Theeuwis, had already lost a wooden mill in Zundert, which was blown down in the previous year of 1908. A store called "de Boerenbond" is now located on the former mills location.

== Vincent van Gogh ==
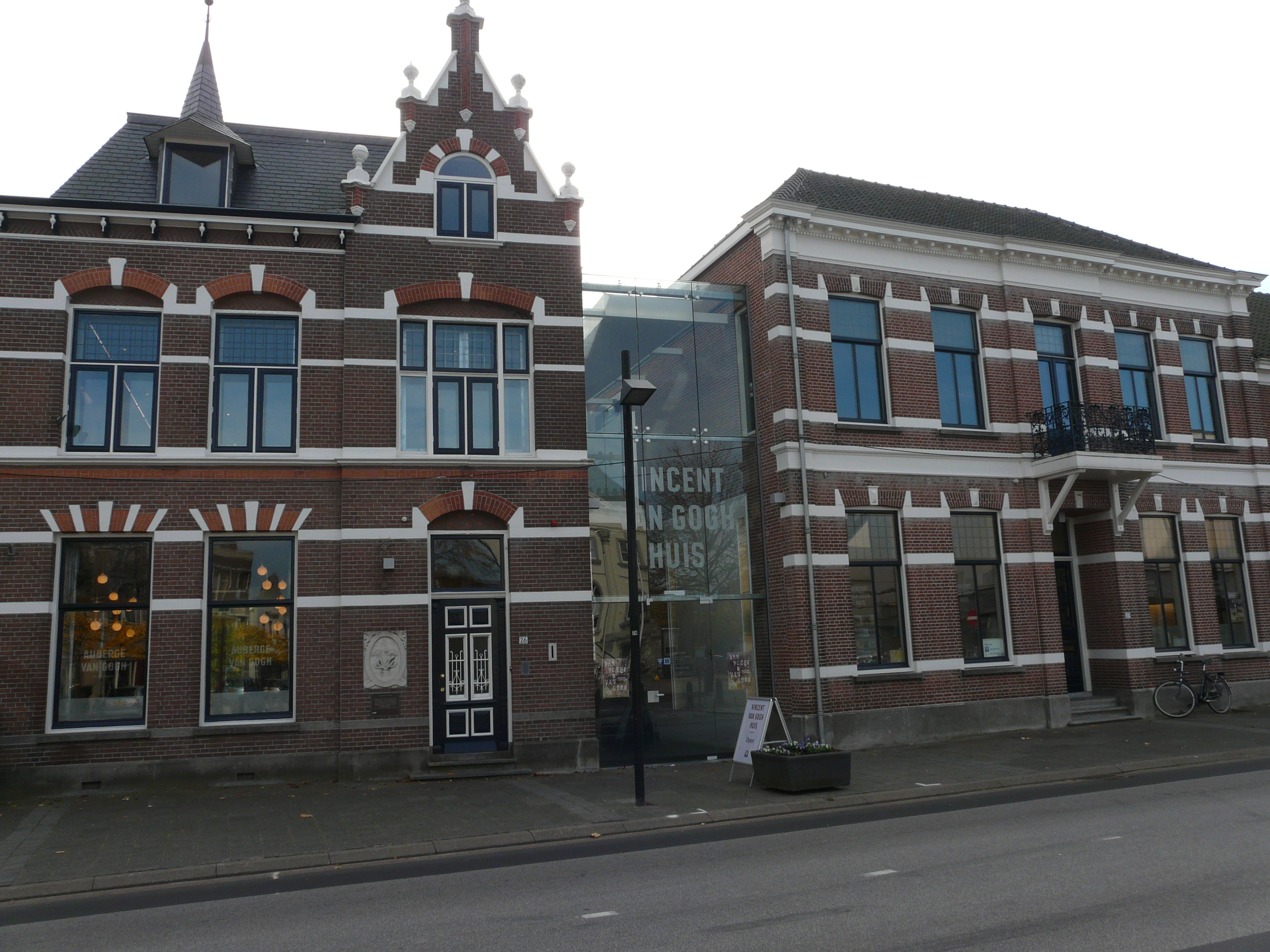
Van Gogh House in 2009.

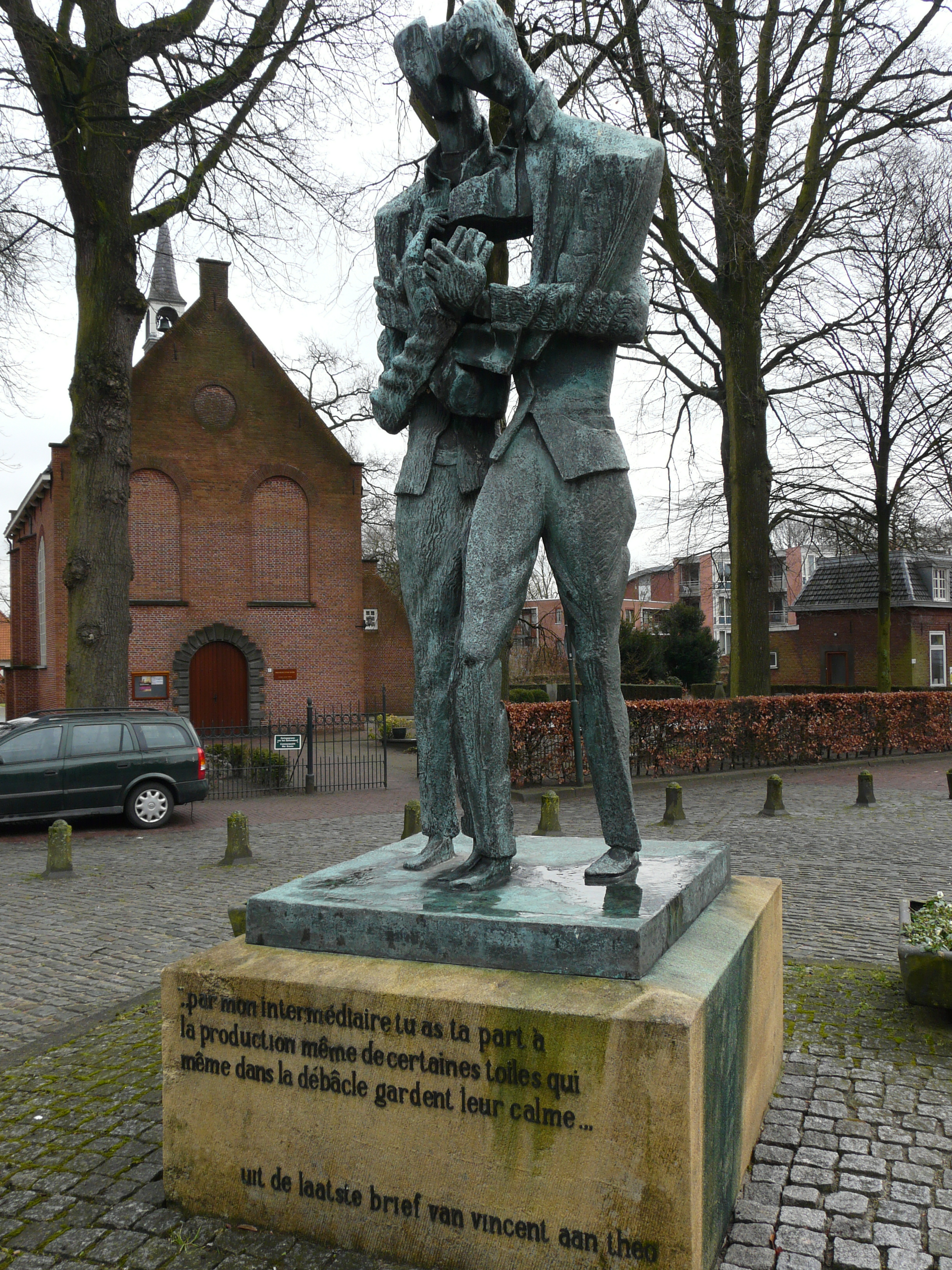
Statue of Vincent and Theo van Gogh by Ossip Zadkine. The Dutch Reformed church is in the background.

Zundert is the birthplace and childhood home of the famous painter Vincent van Gogh. He was born on 30 March 1853 in a little house on Zundert's main street, "Markt 29". The former house is gone, as it was too dilapidated to preserve, but a plaque at this location still commemorates his birth. In May 2007, the renovation of the house at Markt 29, and the neighbouring house, started. After the renovation, the Vincent van Gogh house was opened in August 2008.

People can still visit the Dutch Reformed church built in 1806 in which the father of Vincent, Theodorus van Gogh, started preaching in 1849. In the graveyard is the grave of Vincent's one-year-older brother, who died soon in infancy and who was also called Vincent van Gogh. Vincent did not paint when he lived in Zundert, but he drew some sketches. In letters to his brother Theo, Vincent recalls Zundert and its surroundings a few times when writing about childhood, serenity, and learning about life. Because he died in the French town of Auvers-sur-Oise, on 29 July 1890, a special relation between these two places exists. This can, for example, be noticed by the existence of a slightly hidden Auvers-sur-Oise Street, ending at the Van Gogh Square.

To keep Vincent's memory alive, the municipality of Zundert started the project of realising a Vincent van Gogh house. Rather than a classical museum, it is an active environment, with a presentation about van Gogh's life, interactive education, a documentation room and also permanent and temporary expositions. Tourist information is also located in the building, as well as a pleasant bar with a garden terrace.

There is a bronze monument made by the French artist Ossip Zadkine of Vincent and his brother Theo on the "Vincent van Gogh Plein" (Vincent van Gogh square). The statue of Vincent and Theo van Gogh was unveiled on 28 May 1964 by the Dutch queen Juliana. The statue is an abstracted representation of Vincent's connection with his brother Theo. There are several activities here relating to Van Gogh; you can seek tourist information here as well as participate in activities that are located in the Vincent van Gogh house opposite the town hall.

== Flower parade ==
Bloemencorso Zundert was first held in 1936, in honor of then-queen Wilhelmina of the Netherlands, making it the oldest hugely elaborate flower parade in Europe. Every year, the parade commences on the first Sunday of September with the floats remaining on show for the subsequent Monday (considered a holiday by the inhabitants). On Tuesday, starting early in the morning, the floats are destroyed. It is the largest flower parade in the world. The number of visitors can reach up to 50.000 people annually. Huge, impressive lorry mounted sculptures covered in thousands of dahlia flowers parade through the town. Limitations on the size and maximum dimensions of the floats were first defined in 1989, ensuring safe passage of the parade through the streets of Zundert. Considered an honour by the people of Zundert, the floats are typically pushed by volunteers.

There are twenty hamlets competing in Bloemencorso Zundert, each of them constructing their own entry. They are entirely made up of volunteers. The twenty heralds are credited with having their own culture, identity, flag and dahlia fields in and around the municipality, used to decorate the floats for the parade. Collectively, this amounts to about 33 hectares with 600.000 dahlia plants in 50 different colours and varieties. The members of each hamlet plant and pick the flowers themselves, cultivating around 6 million dahlias in Zundert of the total of 8 million dahlias needed for the entire Corso each year. Where needed, the Bloemencorso Zundert relies on other Flower Parades and a few professional growers to fill up shortages of flowers.

On 13 October 2012, the Bloemencorso Zundert became the first Dutch tradition on the national inventory of the UNESCO Convention for the Protection of Intangible Cultural Heritage, ratified by the Netherlands on 15 May 2012. This ratification was publicly announced by State Secretary Halbe Zijlstra during the parade on 2 September 2012.

The Bloemencorso Zundert was cancelled in 2020 due to the global COVID-19 pandemic, the first time since the Second World War. In 2022, the flower parade commenced on 4 September.

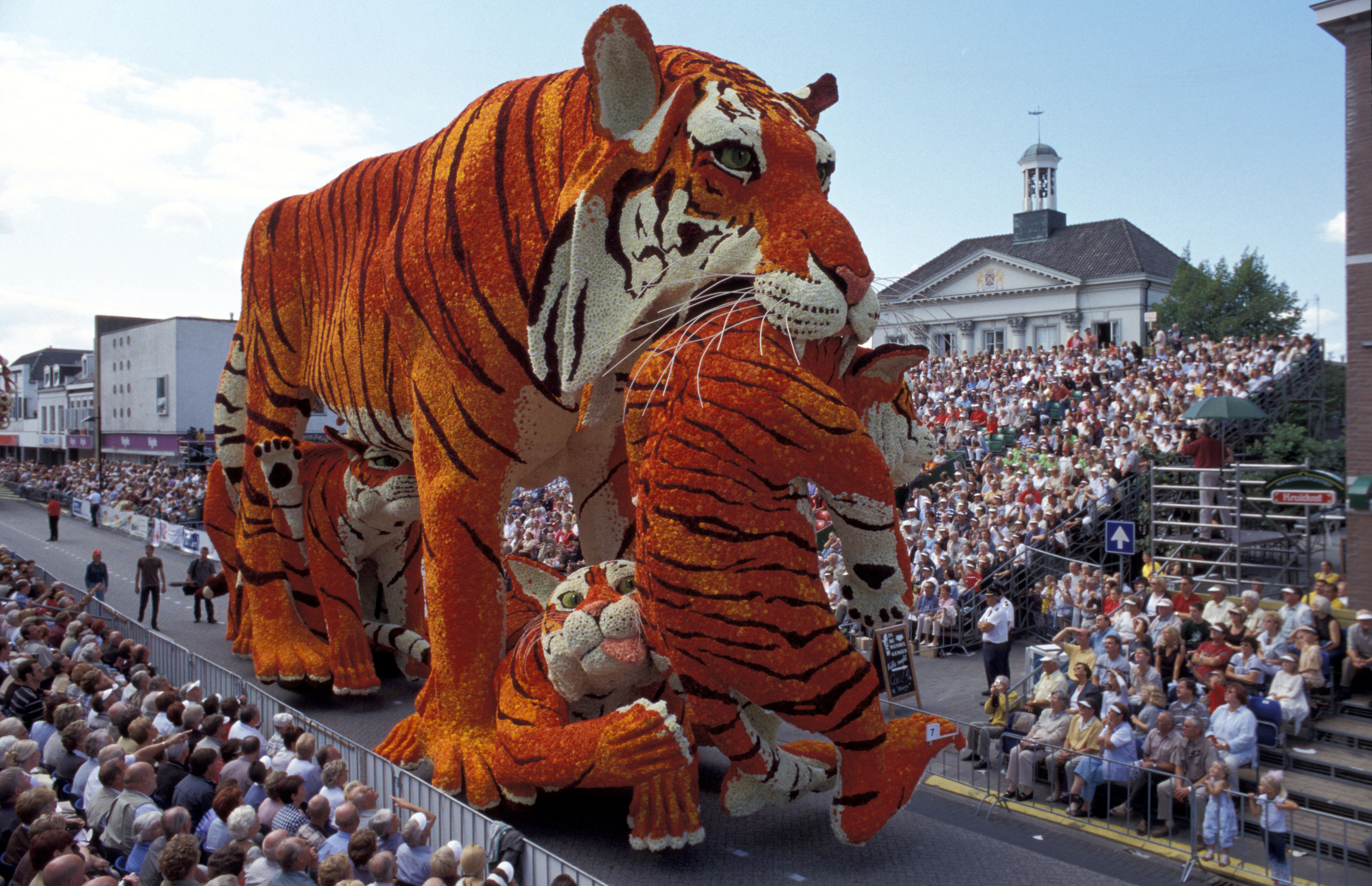
Winner 'Moederskroost' by Klein-Zundertse Heikant, Bloemencorso Zundert in 2002

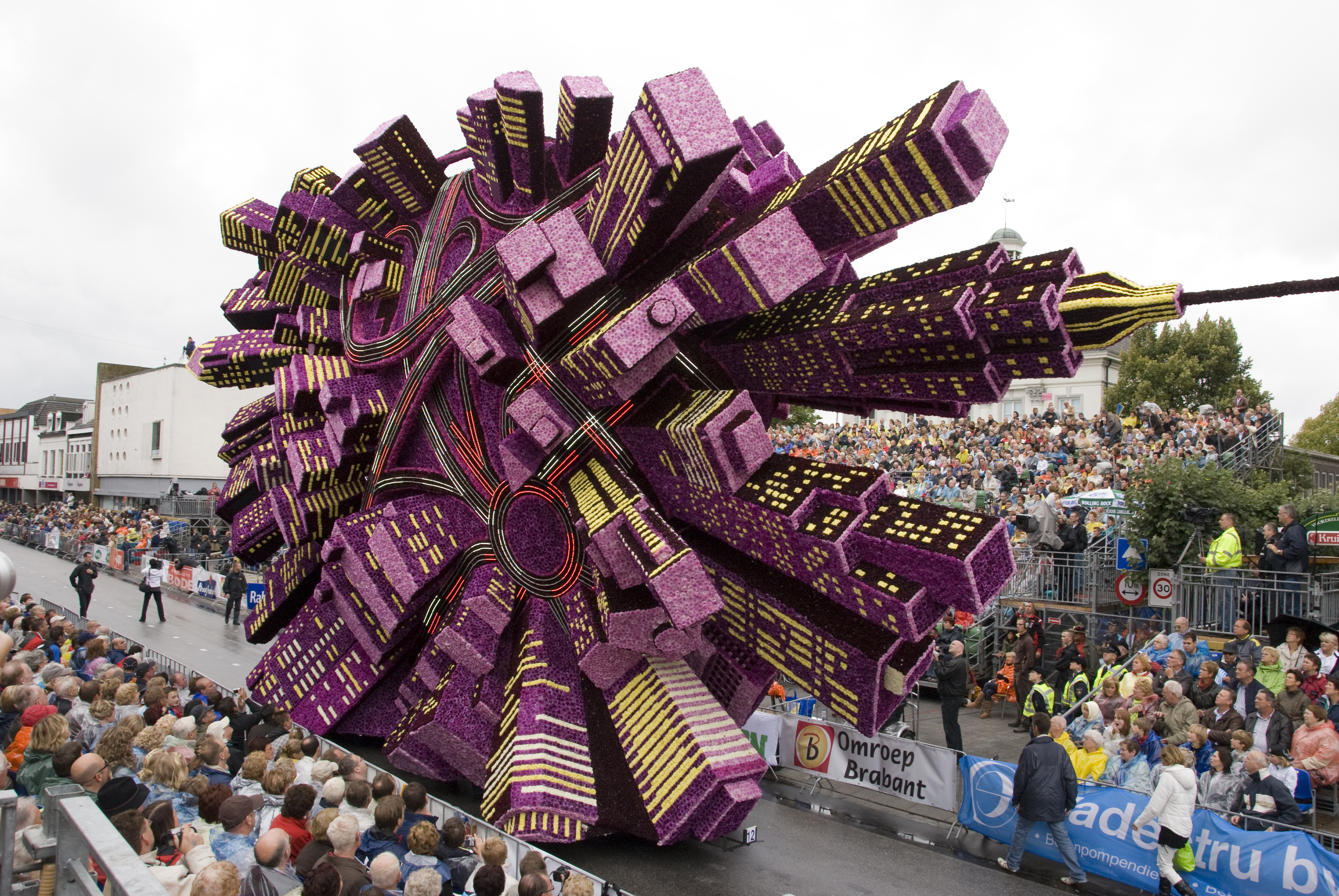
Winner 'Booming City' by Helpt Elkander, Bloemencorso Zundert in 2008

== Notable people ==
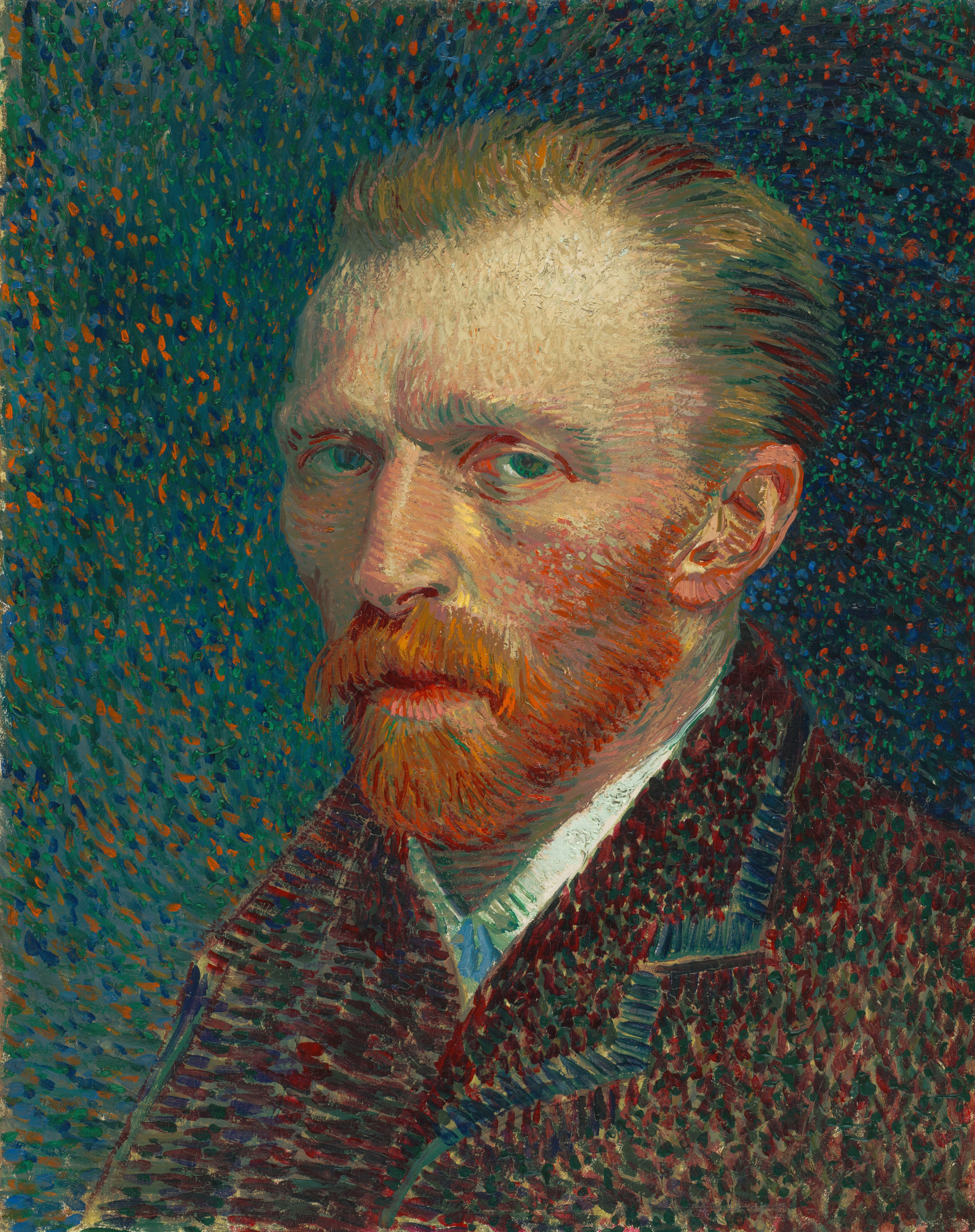
Vincent van Gogh, born in Zundert in 1853.

Zundert has been home to:

- Hendrik Detmers (1761 in Groot-Zundert – 1825), Dutch general in the Battle of Waterloo
- Vincent van Gogh (1853–1890), Dutch post-impressionist painter
- Theo van Gogh (1857–1891), Dutch art dealer, brother of Vincent van Gogh and great-grandfather of film director, satirist and writer Theo van Gogh.
- Wil van Gogh (1862–1941), Dutch feminist and the youngest sister of Vincent and Theo van Gogh.
- Richard Roland Holst (1868–1938) Dutch painter, draftsman, lithographer, book cover designer, etcher and writer and his wife, Henriette Roland Holst-van der Schalk (1869–1952) Dutch poet and communist, nominated for the Nobel Prize in Literature, spent their summers on their estate on the Buissche Heide.
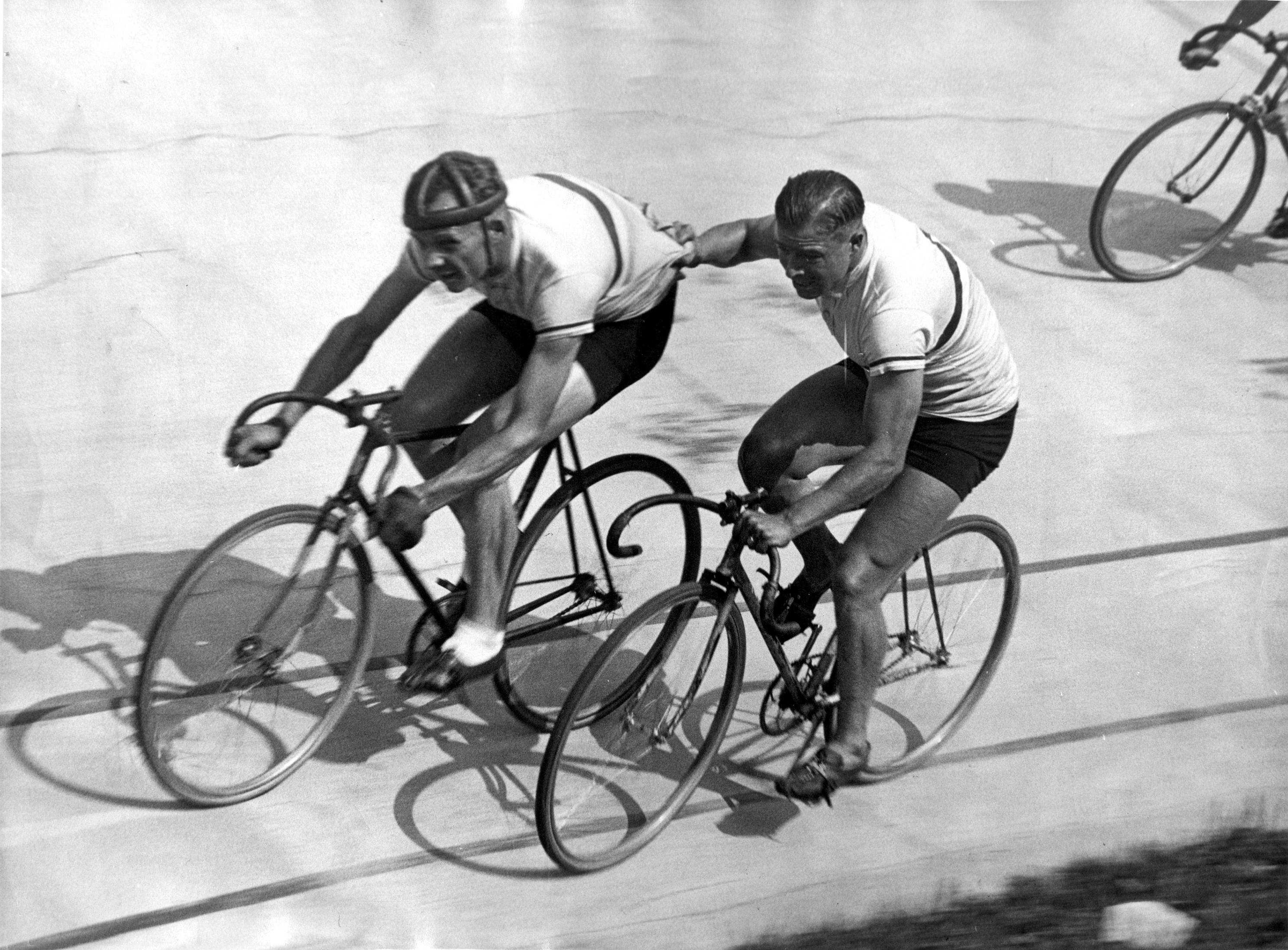
  Relay between Adrianus Braspennincx (left) and Jan Pijnenburg, 16 September 1933.
- Janus Braspennincx (1903 in Zundert – 1977) Dutch racing cyclist, team silver medallist in the 1928 Summer Olympics
- Johan van der Velde (born 1956 in Rijsbergen), former Dutch cyclist
- Jacques Hanegraaf (born 1960 in Rijsbergen), retired Dutch road bicycle racer, competed at the 1980 Summer Olympics
- Jelle Nijdam (born 1963 in Rijsbergen), former professional cyclist, competed at the 1984 Summer Olympics
- Jan Siemons (1964), former Dutch professional cyclist
- Wim Voermans (born in 1968 in Zundert), Dutch professor of constitutional and administrative law at Leiden University.
- Jacco Verhaeren (born 1969 in Rijsbergen), Dutch swimming coach, Netherlands Coach of the Decade in 2010, and honoured in 2012 with Ridder in de Orde van Oranje-Nassau (Royal Knight of Orange-Nassau).

== Gallery ==
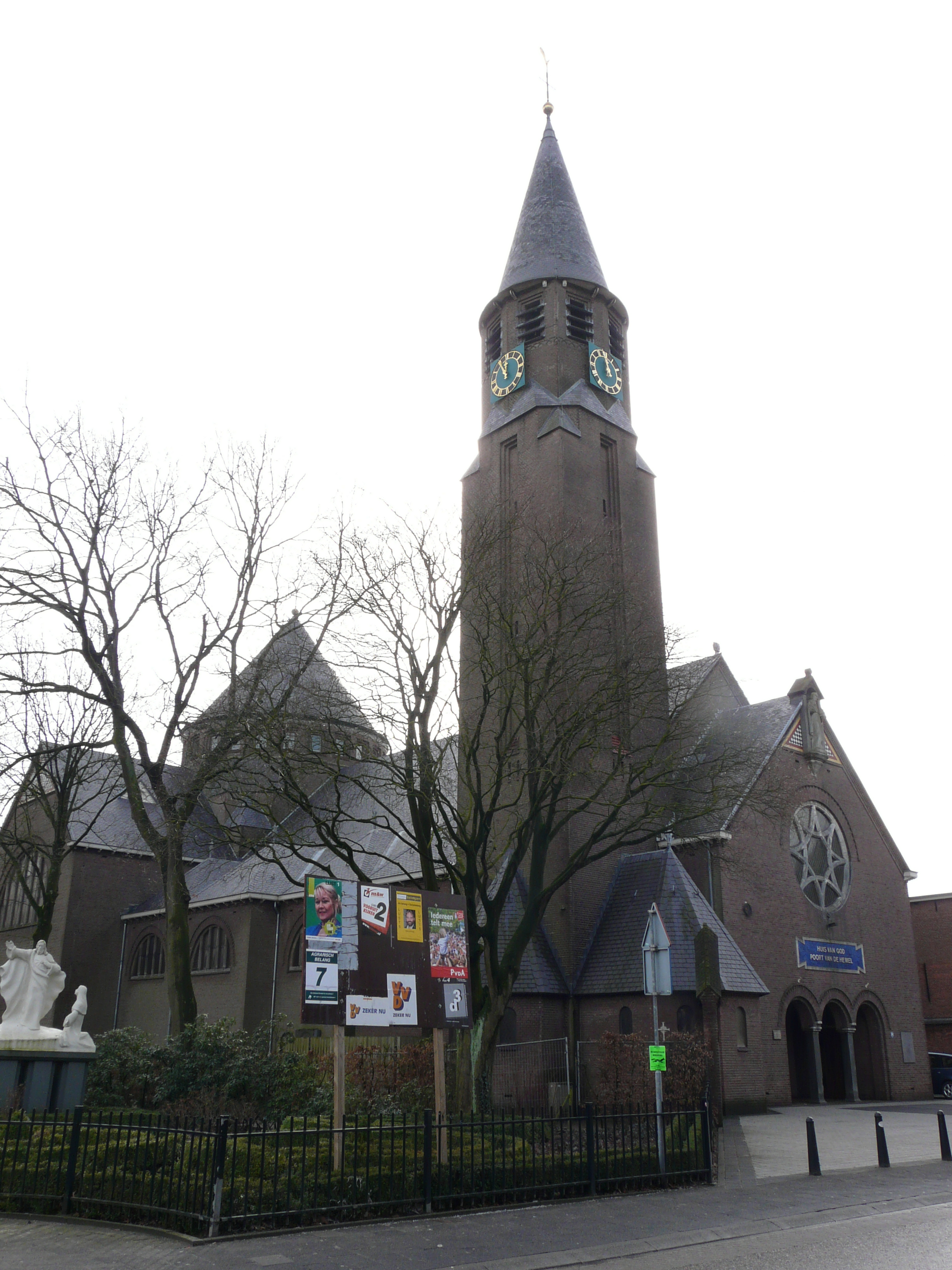
Sint-Trudokerk, Zundert

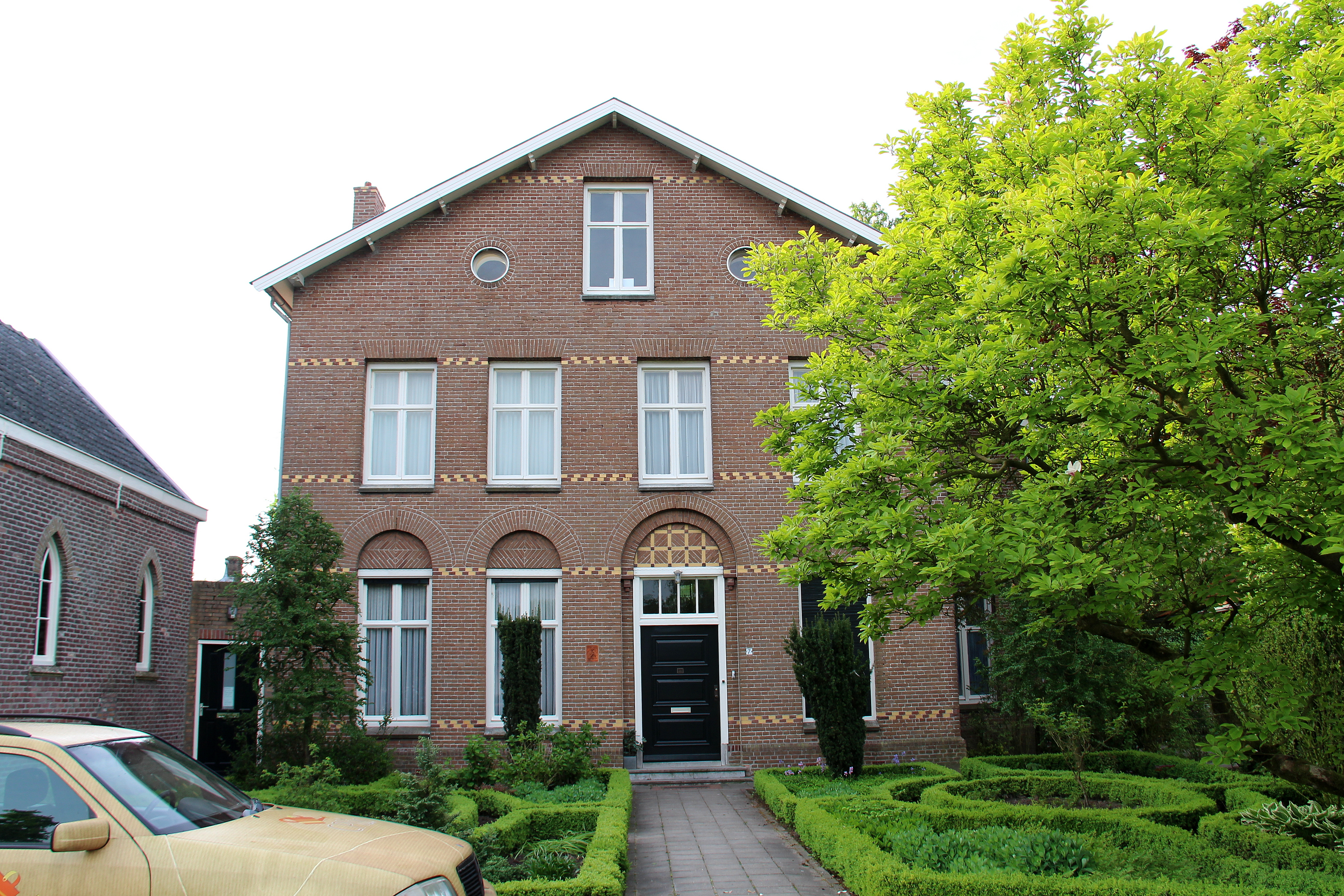
Pastorie, Klein-Zundert

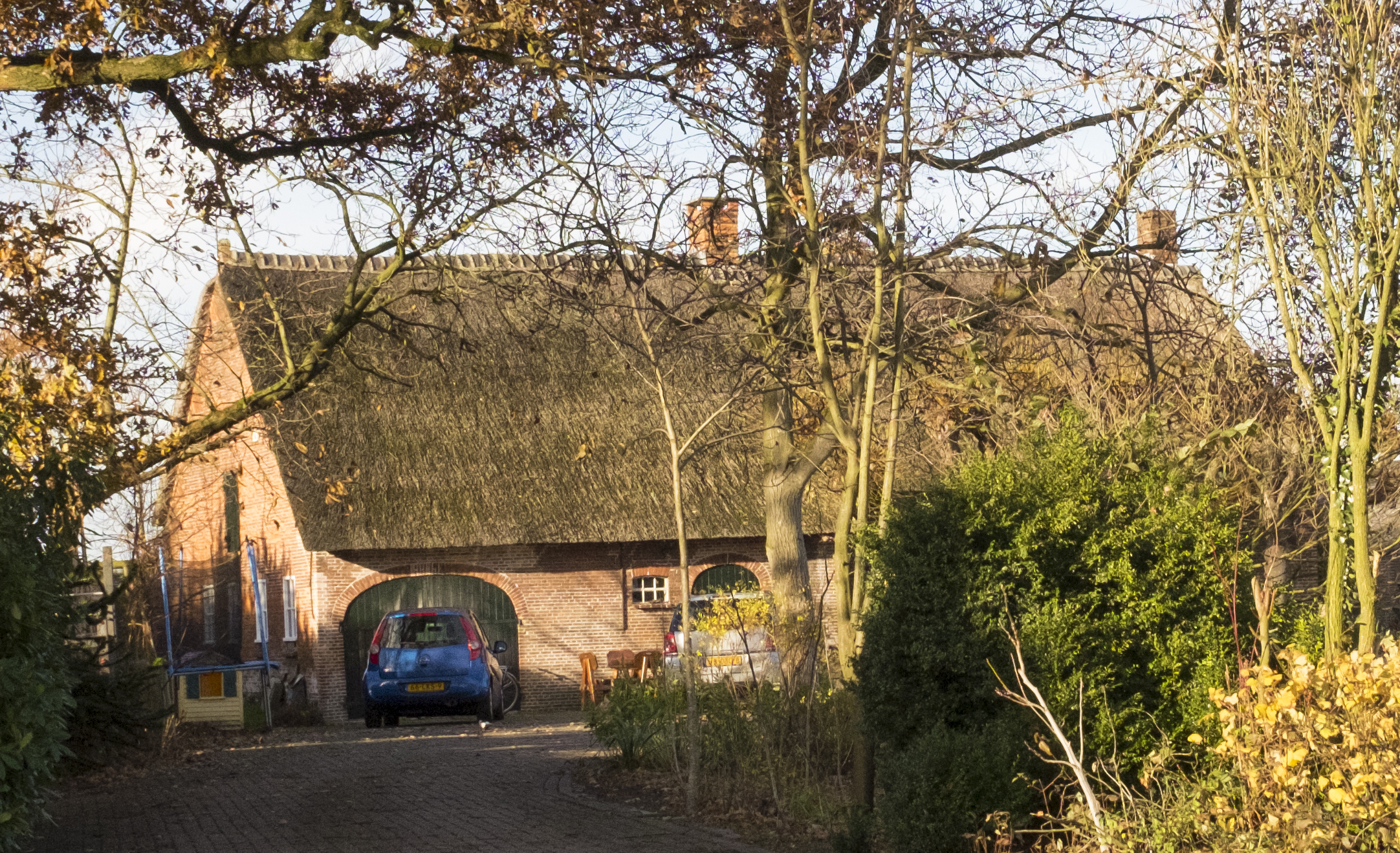
Breedschotsestraat, Rijsbergen

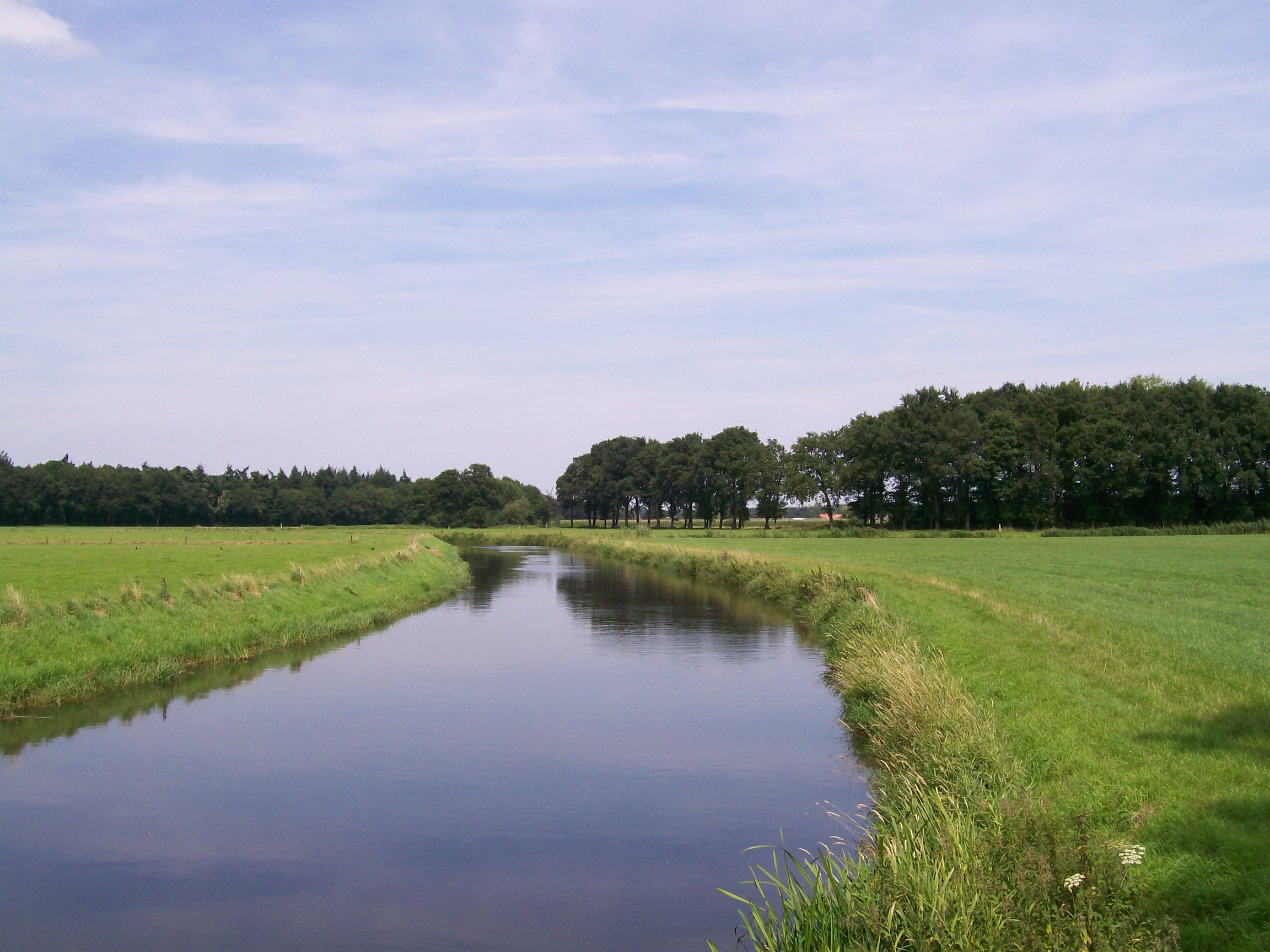
Aa of Weerijs, near Krabbenbosschen

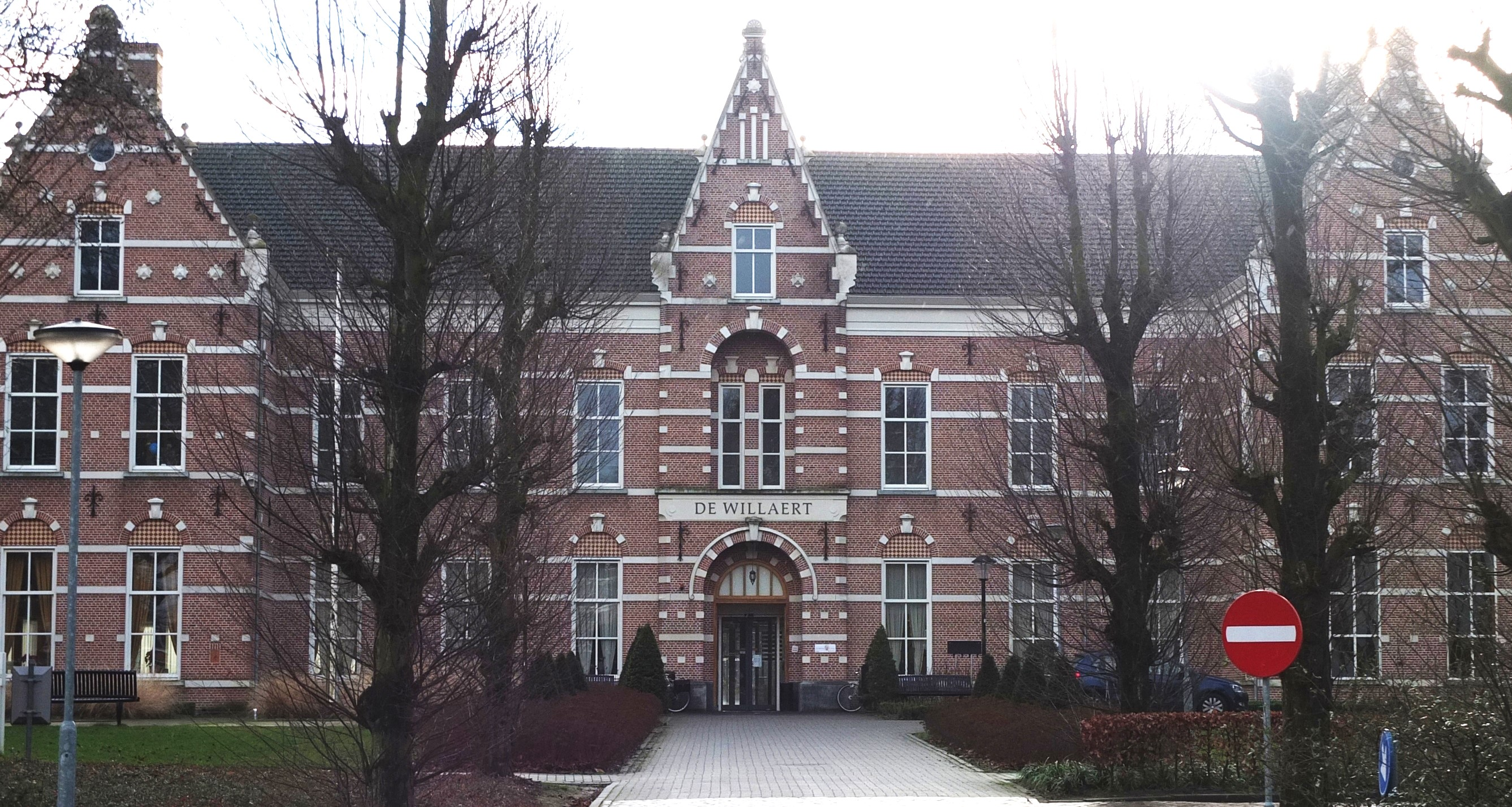
De Willaert, Zundert

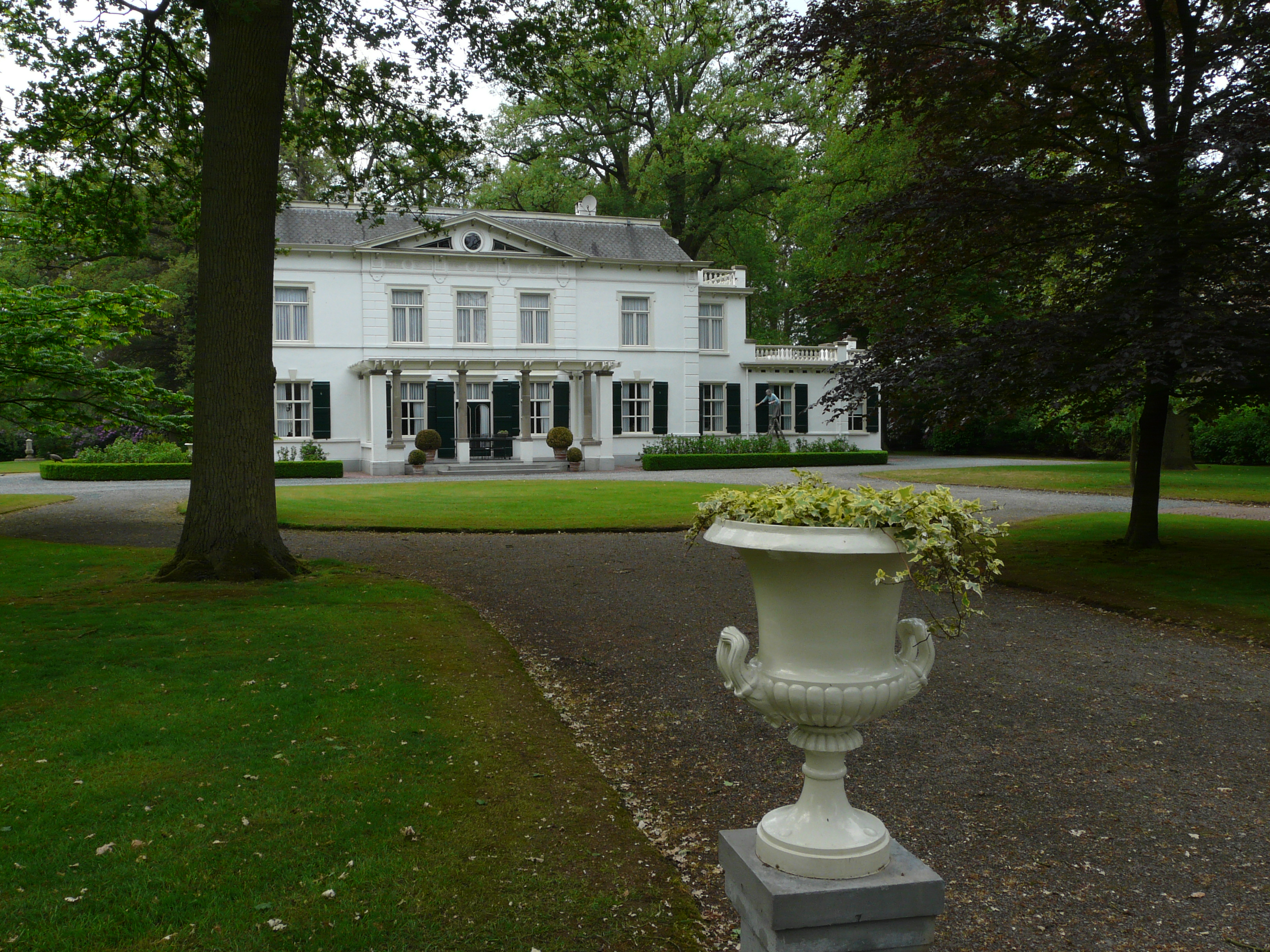
Landhuis Wallsteijn

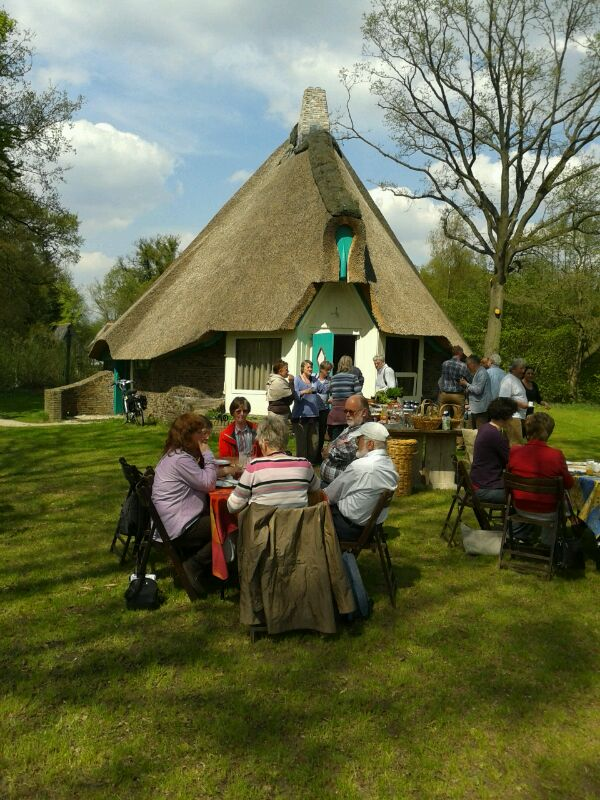
Atelier on the Buissche Heide, Achtmaal

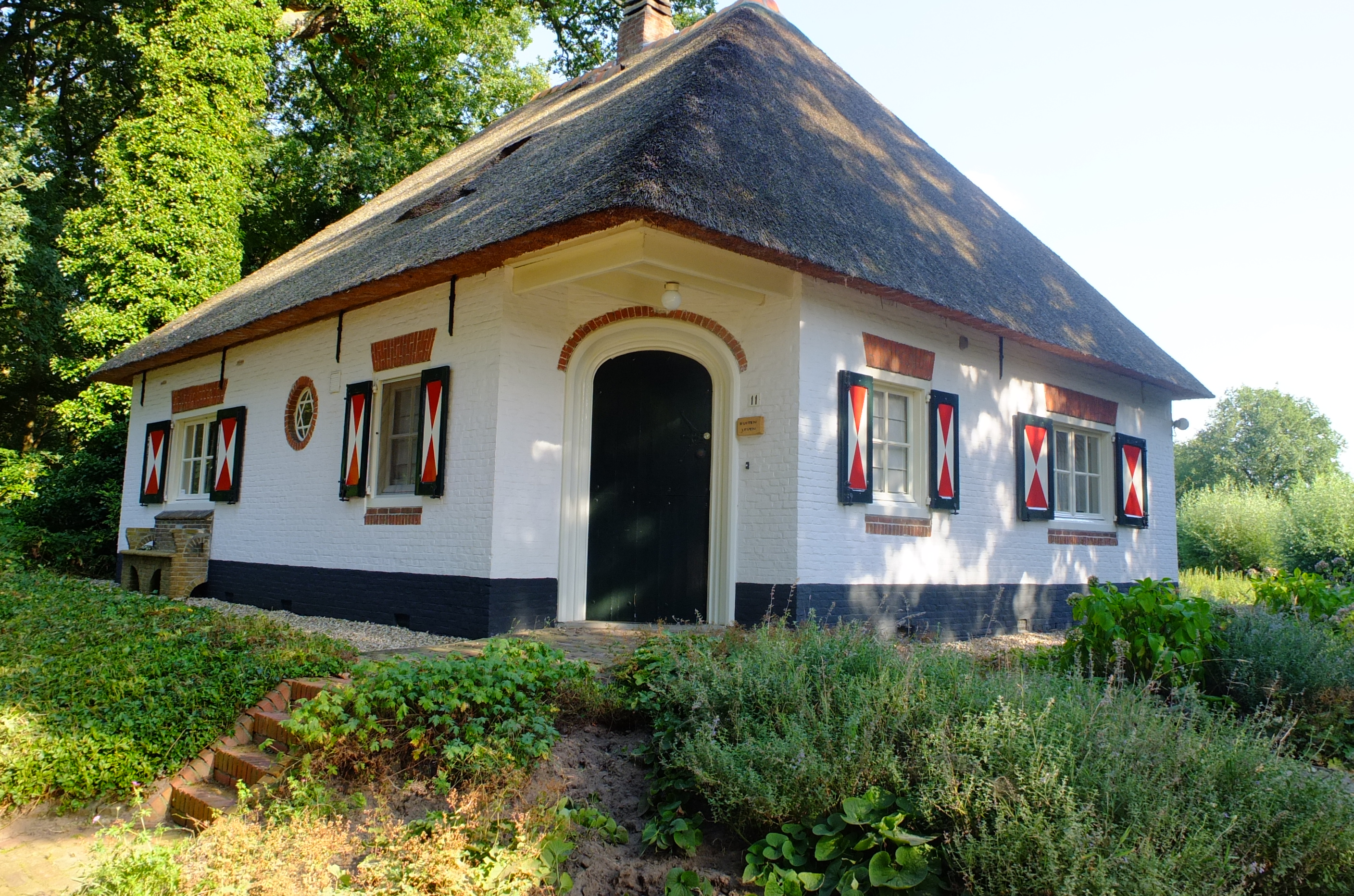
Angorahoeve, Achtmaal

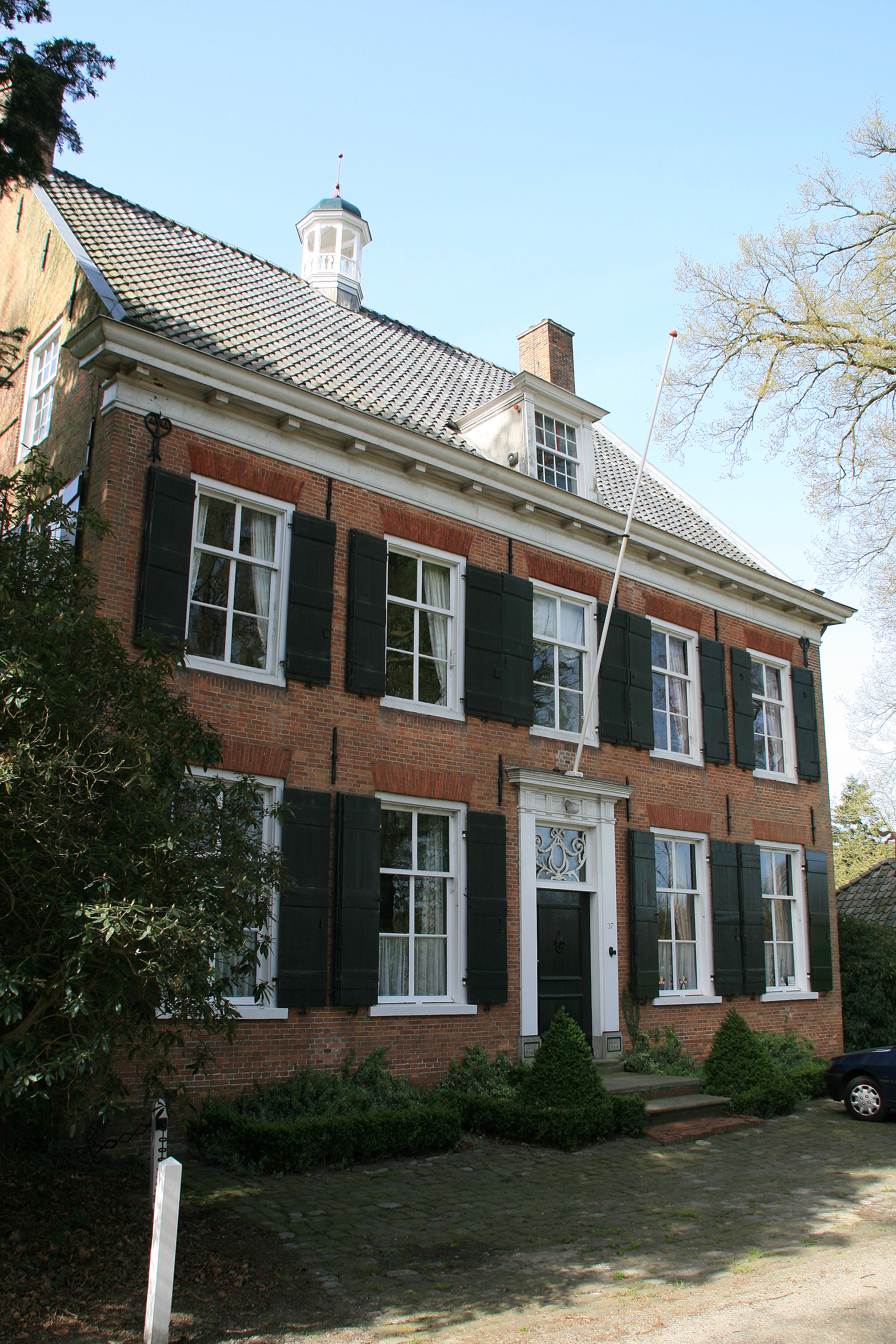
Landhuis de Moeren, Zundert

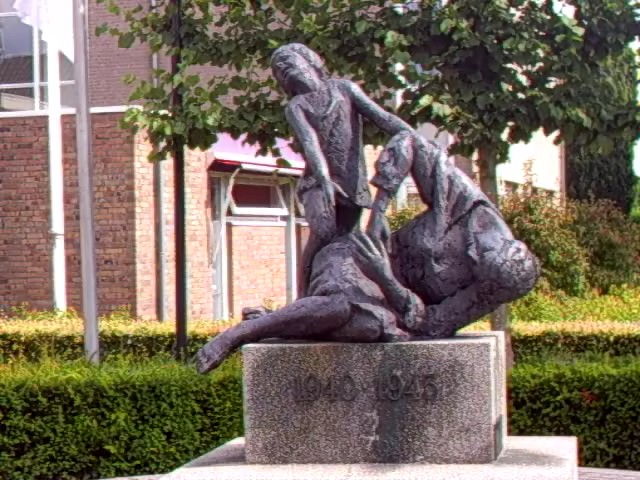
Second World War monument, Rijsbergen
