= Equestrian statue of King Chulalongkorn =

Statue in Bangkok

- พระบรมราชานุสาวรีย์ พระบาทสมเด็จพระจุลจอมเกล้าเจ้าอยู่หัว
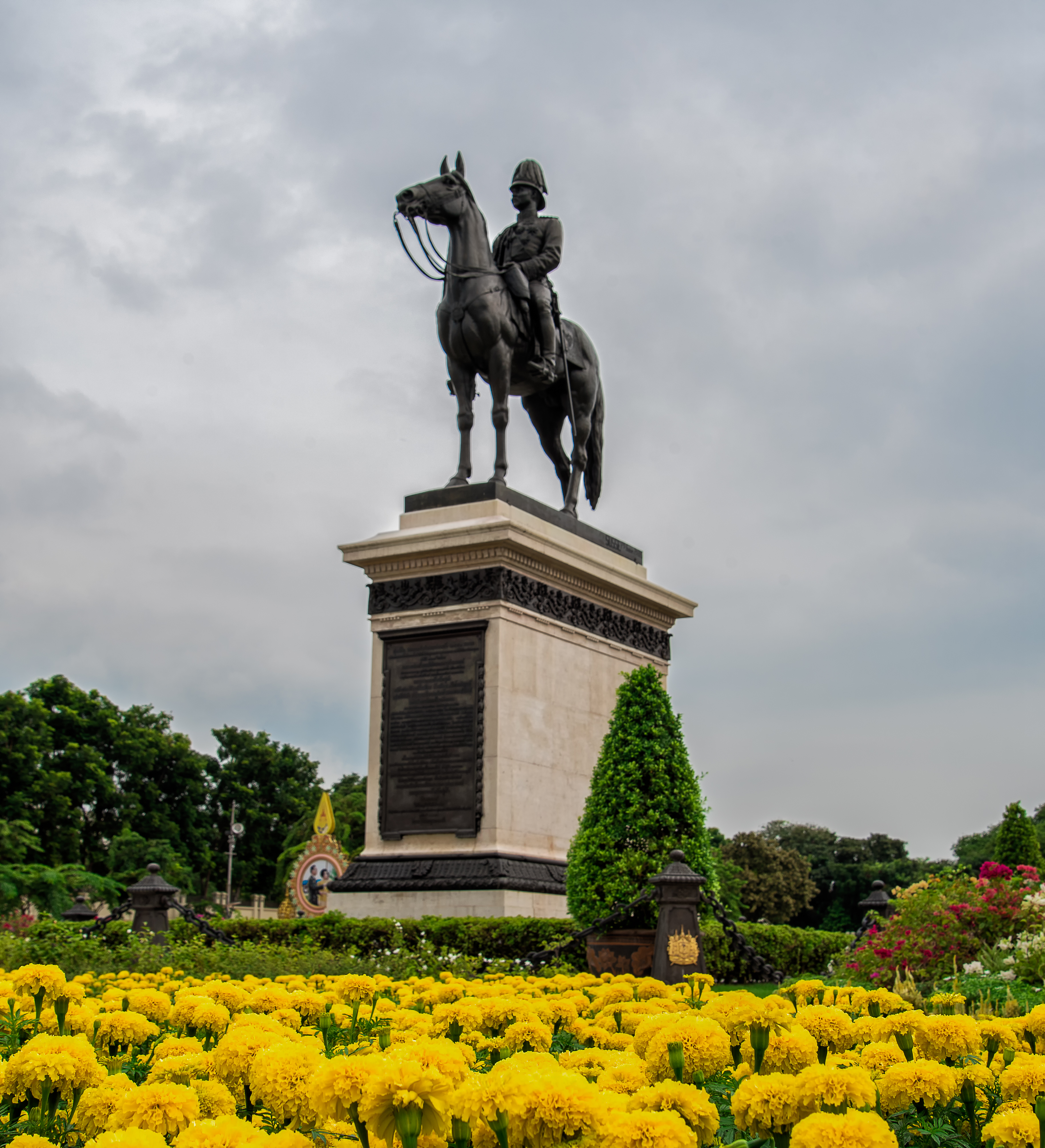
- Interactive map of Equestrian statue of King Chulalongkorn
- Location: Royal Plaza, Bangkok, Thailand
- Coordinates: 13.769242°N 100.512017°E
- Designer: Georges Saulo
- Type: Statue
- Material: Bronze
- Height: 5 metres (16 ft)
- Completion date: 22 August 1907
- Opening date: 11 November 1908
- Dedicated to: King Chulalongkorn

Equestrian statue of Chulalongkorn the Great, (Thai: พระบรมราชานุสาวรีย์ พระบาทสมเด็จพระจุลจอมเกล้าเจ้าอยู่หัว) otherwise known as Equestrian statue (Thai: พระบรมรูปทรงม้า, RTGS: phraborom marup songma, pronounced [pʰráʔ bɔː rom má rûːp soŋ máː]) is an outdoor sculpture in cast bronze at the center of the Royal Plaza in Bangkok, Thailand, honoring King Chulalongkorn. It was erected on 11 November 1908 to commemorate his 40th anniversary of his accession to the throne, the longest-reigning monarch in Siamese history at that time.

== Description and location ==
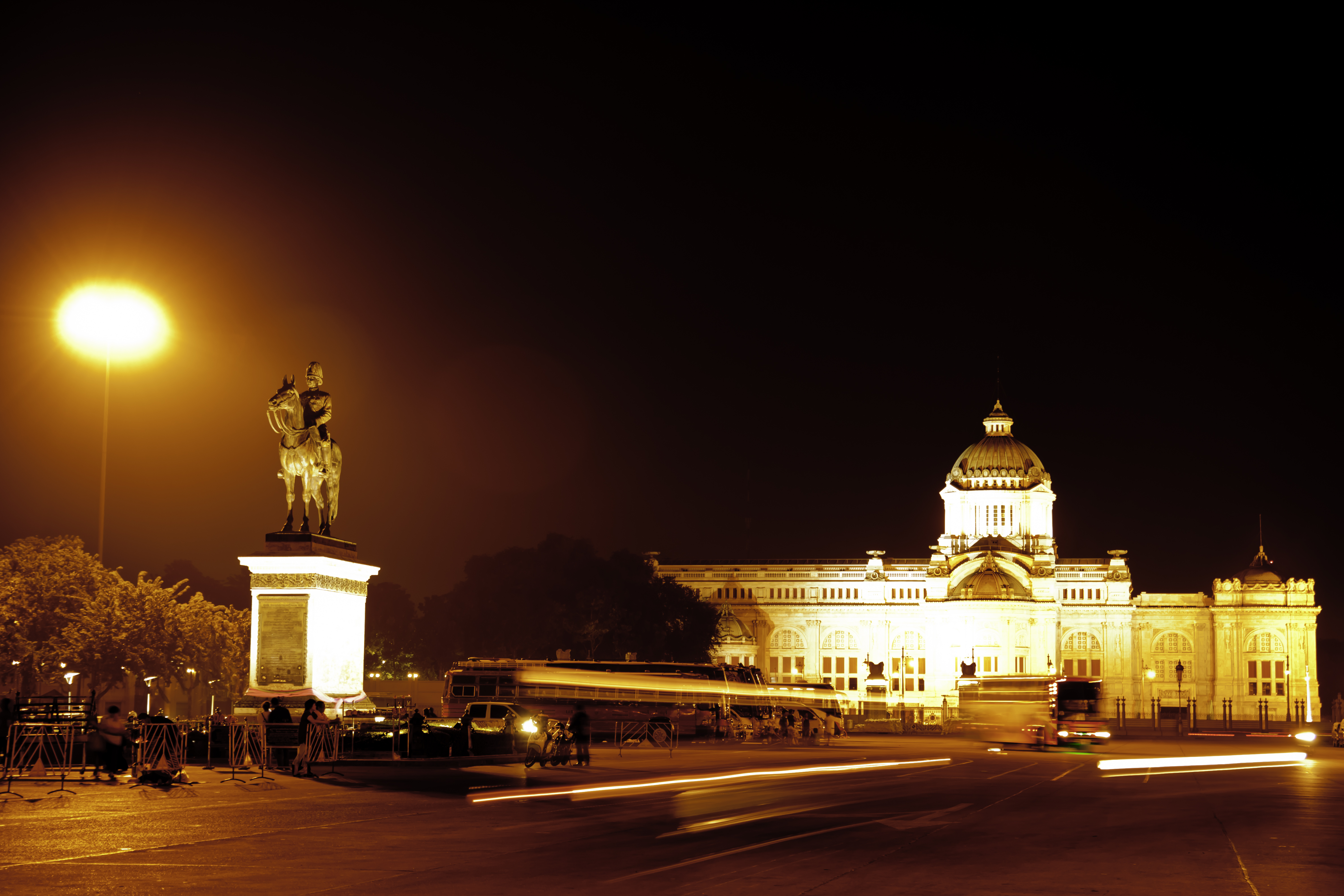
The Equestrian statue at night.

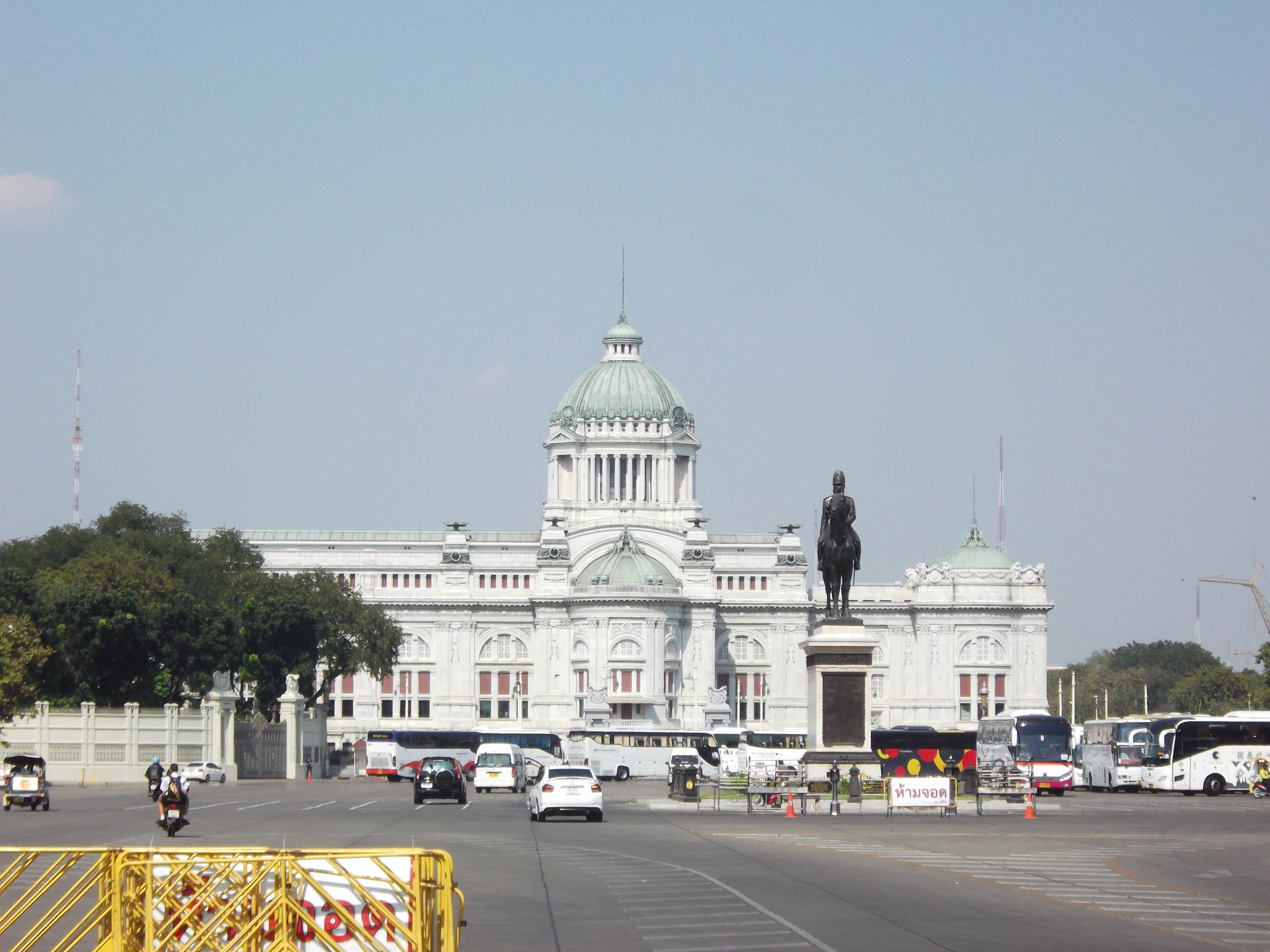
The Royal Plaza and the Equestrian statue

The statue is cast in bronze. It is 5 meters in height and weighs 6 tons. It is attached to a 25-centimeter thick bronze base on top of a 2-meter-wide, 5-meter-long and 6-meter-tall marble pedestal.

The statue itself depicts Chulalongkorn in military uniform of Field marshal, wearing his decorations; he holds the reins in his left hand and a baton in his right.

The statue stands at the center of the Royal Plaza, facing southwest towards Ratchadamnoen Avenue. It lies to south of the Ananta Samakhom Throne Hall, to the west of Suan Amphon and to the east of Sanam Suea Pa.

== History ==
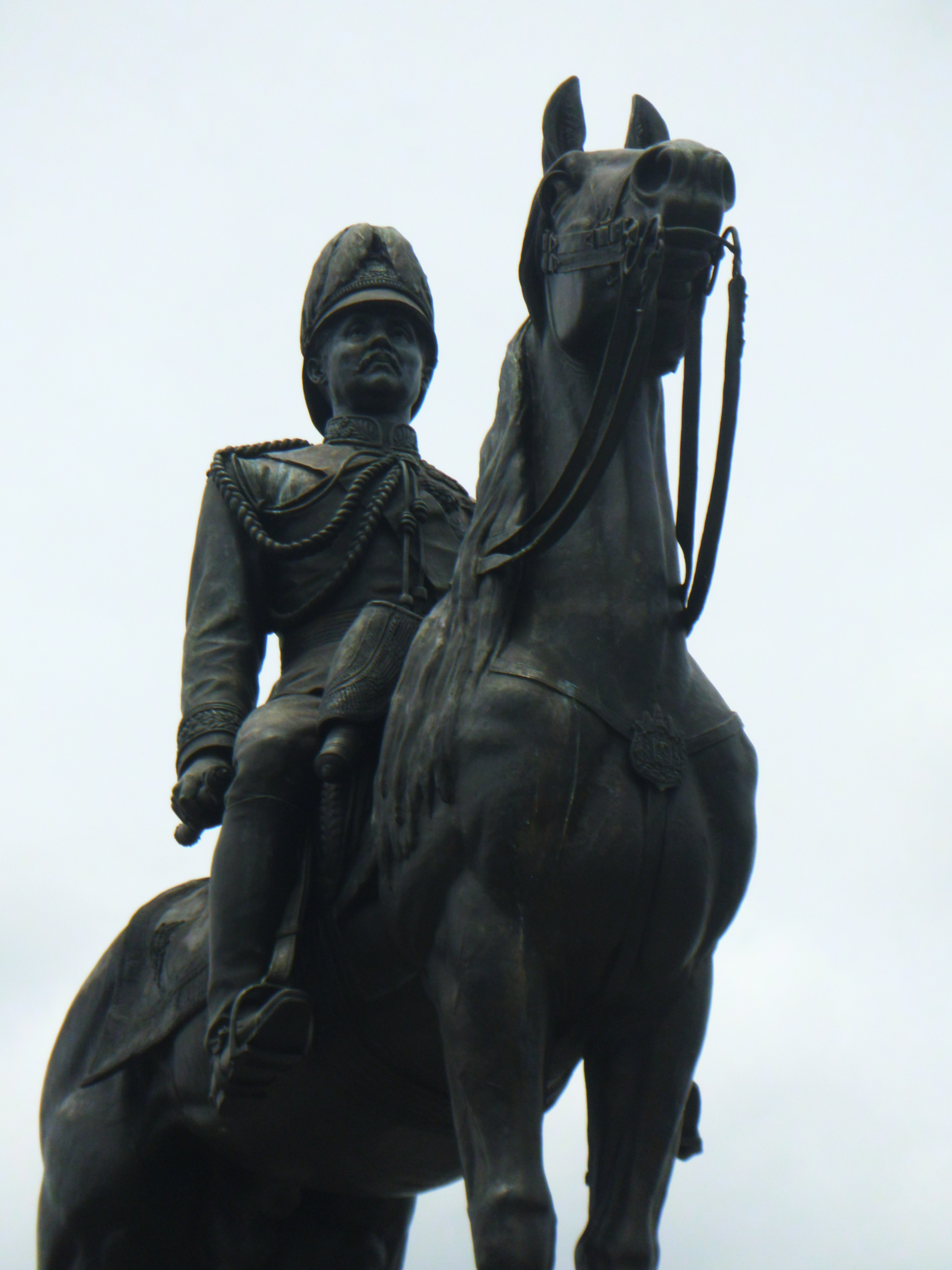
Equestrian statue of King Chulalongkorn

It was believed that Chulalongkorn had desired for an equestrian statue since he was a young King. In the 13 June 1874 edition of The Illustrated London News, it was reported that a silver equestrian statue of Chulalongkorn was cast by an English metallurgist of the Messrs. Hunt and Roskell by Chulalongkorn's commission. However, there are no other source or evidence that mentioned of this fact.

During Chulalongkorn's second 'Grand Tour' of Europe in 1907, he visited the Palace of Versailles in France and made a remark that he was impressed by the Equestrian Statue of King Louis XIV and thought that if an equestrian statue of him were to be erected at a plaza between Ratchadamnoen Avenue and the Ananta Samakhom Throne Hall, it would be majestic which were similar to other modern nations in Europe.

However, there are also argument that Chulalongkorn rather made a remark about the statue of Italian King Victor Emmanuel II in Milan, Italy that it was "very beautiful". This is supported by the fact that Chulalongkorn had expressed his interest and fascination in the sculpture and metallurgy of Italy since his first 'Grand Tour' of Europe in 1897.

His remark was later made known to Crown Prince Vajiravudh, the regent of Siam at that time, and after consultation with his ministers, they proposed that in commemoration of Chulalongkorn's 40th anniversary of his accession to the throne in 1908, an equestrian statue were to be erected by public donation.

After Chulalongkorn's approval, Prince Charoonsak Kridakara, Siamese ambassador to France, was assigned to find a suitable foundry for the sculpture. He recommended Susse Frères, a well-known foundry company located in Paris, France because it was satisfactory in terms of reputation, price and experience.

Two French prominent metallurgist, Clovis-Edmond Masson and Georges Saulo, were in charge of such work. On 22 August 1907, Chulalongkorn went to the Susse Frères foundry and mounted on a horse statue to be modeled. The statue was initially modeled after an equestrian statue of the Spanish King Alfonso XIII, whose statue had just been cast by Susse Frères in 1906. However, since Alfonso XIII was a tall and slender man, the statue had to be adjusted to the body of Chulalongkorn. The statue was complete and then shipped to Siam, reaching the port in Bangkok on 11 November 1908, which coincided with Rajamangalabhisek Royal Ceremony which commemorated Chulalongkorn's 40th anniversary of his accession to the throne, the longest-reigning monarch in Siamese history.

The budget for the statue was estimated to be around 200,000 baht but the money donated from the public exceeded the expected amount to around 1,200,000 baht. The excess of such amount was offered to Chulalongkorn for future public use upon his discretion. However, before deciding what the money should be spent on, Chulalongkorn died on 23 October 1910. His successor, Vajiravudh, later used such money to build Chulalongkorn University in his honor.

== See also ==
- Chulalongkorn
- Royal Plaza (Bangkok)
