= Valentine Prax =

French painter

- Born: 23 July 1897; Bône, French Algeria
- Died: 15 April 1981 (aged 83); Paris, France
- Education: École nationale des beaux-arts d'Alger
- Occupation: Painter
- Movement: Expressionism; cubism
- Spouse: Ossip Zadkine (m. 1920; died 1967)

Valentine Henriette Prax (23 July 1897 – 15 April 1981) was a French expressionist and cubist painter.

== Biography ==
Prax was born on 23 July 1897 (Note: Also cited as 1899.) in Bône, French Algeria (present-day Algeria). Her father was French of Catalan origin and Vice-Consul of Spain and Portugal in Bône, and of a Marseilles mother of Sicilian origin. Raised in French Algeria, Prax studied art in Algiers at the École nationale des beaux-arts d'Alger. She fulfilled her long-held dream to travel to France when she moved to Paris in 1919. When she rented the tiny "glass cage" of her studio in 35 Rue Rousselet, she said she became "the captive bird for fifty francs per month." She was alone, timid and poor, but she was in Paris.

There, she met Ossip Zadkine, a sculptor of Russian origin, who introduced her to the close-knit world of their avant-garde Montparnasse neighborhood. They married in the summer of 1920. In that same year, Prax made her first solo exhibition at a Paris gallery in April.

As she began gaining recognition among Parisian art lovers, the Galerie Berthe Weill devoted an exhibition to her in January 1924. The young couple's fortunes rose. In 1928 the couple bought a studio house in Paris and in September 1934 they acquired a dilapidated country house that could accommodate 4 studios in southwestern France, in Les Arques.

For inspiration, Prax turned to typical village life there, exploring "rural peasant life in a raw expressionistic manner." In 1937, she was invited to participate in the prestigious Paris exhibition.

=== War years ===
With the advent of World War II, normal life ceased. According to Prax: “As soon as the German troops arrived in Paris, I felt that our entire way of life was threatened, and also our feelings and thoughts."

Her husband, Zadkine, who was half-Jewish, fled to the United States for safety while Prax chose to remain in France to protect the couple's art and property. She objected to the Nazi occupation of her country, especially as they threatened to confiscate her homes in Paris and Les Arques as 'Jewish property.' She managed to save her husband's bronze sculptures by putting them in basements of neighbors along their street during the Nazi Occupation of Paris, but she destroyed his paintings "rather than see them scattered by the Nazi regime." She kept only a few select pieces in secret.

Sequestered in her country house, Prax was poor and hungry, and turned to painting for solace. In 1942, she received word that Zadkine had decided not return to her (he was having a relationship with American artist Carol Janeway); subsequently, the style of her paintings changed, becoming more cubist. She moved more to mythology, turning to her Algerian memories. Although despondent, she confessed later, "this period of the war was the best for my artistic production."

In 1945, she received a telegram from her husband: "I'm ill, miserable and penniless. Are you happy for me to return?" She assented but when he arrived in France, he was in terrible health and, like her, penniless. (He died on 25 November 1967.)

=== Post-war exhibitions ===
With life returning to normal in France, Prax saw her professional recognition and income grow. Many exhibitions followed, including some in the United States.

- Galerie du Faubourg in 1950
- The Salon des Tuileries in 1951
- The Salon d’Automne in 1952
- Galerie André Weil in 1954
- Galerie Katia Granoff in 1963 (a retrospective exhibiting 50 of her paintings)
- Galerie Chappe-Lautier in Toulouse in 1968
- Galerie René Drouet in Paris in 1968, 1971 and 1973
- City of Paris Musée d’Art Moderne in 1976

=== Final years ===
Prax died 15 April 1981 in Paris and bequeathed her entire estate to support a new museum dedicated to her husband's work.

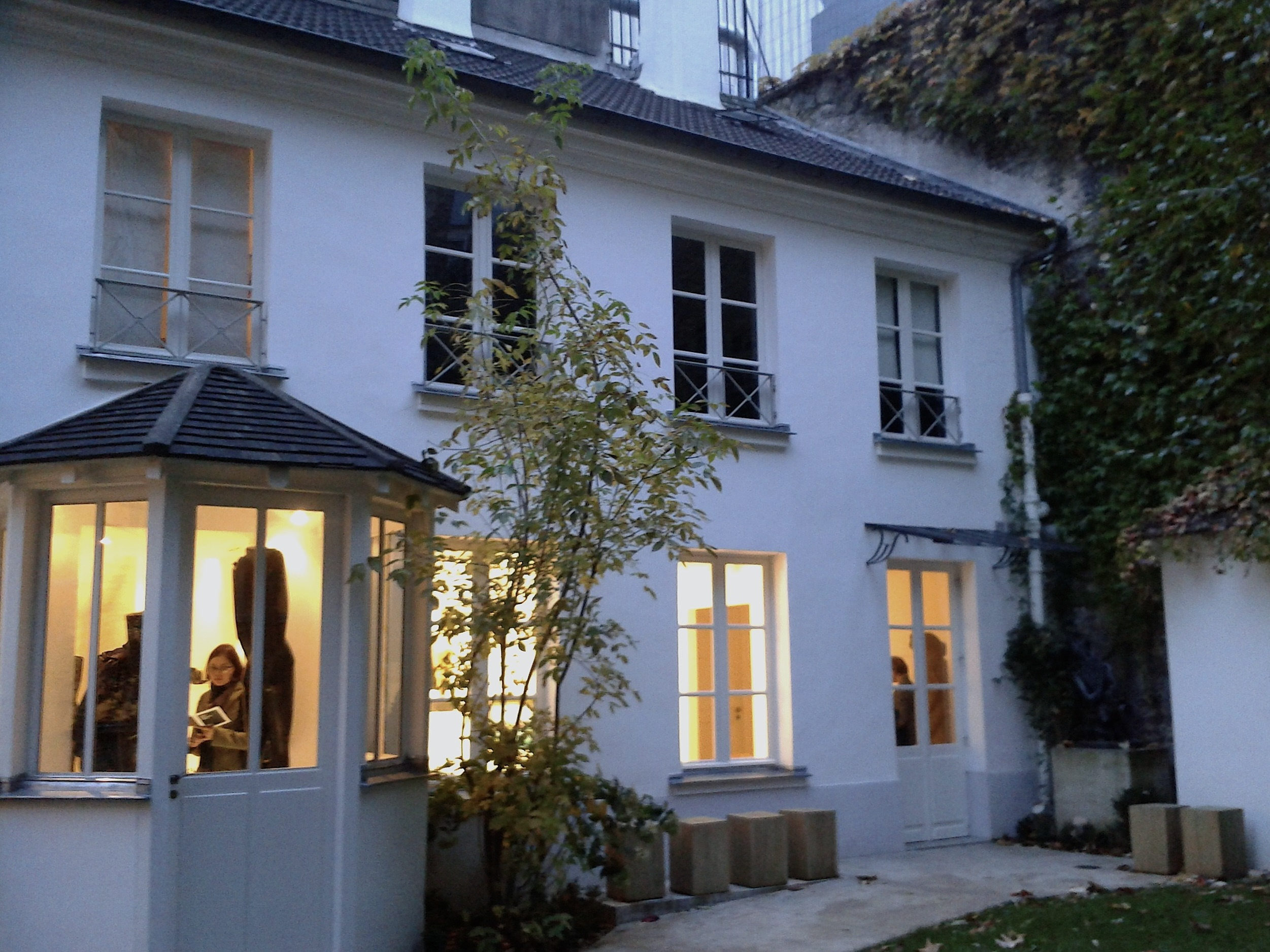
Musée Zadkine, Paris

One year after her death, the Musée Zadkine was opened in the couple's old Parisian studio by Jacques Chirac, then Mayor of Paris. Since 1988, a second museum has been established at their country home in Les Arques, to display works by both Prax and Zadkine.

== On exhibition ==
Prax's work can be found on exhibition in museums around the world including: the Musée National d’Art Moderne (Centre Pompidou), Paris; Musée d’Art Moderne de la Ville de Paris; National Gallery of Victoria, Melbourne; Musée Zadkine, Paris; Brussels; Algiers; Amsterdam; Geneva; Grenoble, France; and Saint-Etienne, France.
