= Prax =

Prax may refer to:

- Prax (malware), or Regin, a malware and hacking toolkit
- Prax Group, former operator of Lindsey Oil Refinery, England
- Praso, Italy (German: Prax), a former comune in Trentino, Italy
- Mike Prax (born 1956), American politician from Alaska
- Valentine Prax (1897–1981), French expressionist and cubist painter
