= Ossip Zadkine =

Russian and French artist (1888–1967)

- Осип Цадкин
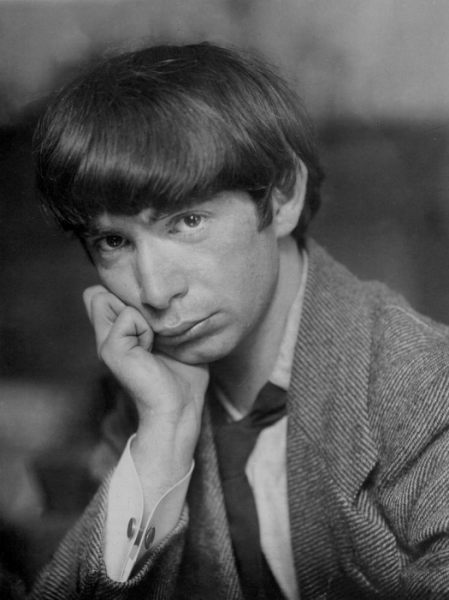
- Zadkine in 1914
- Born: Yossel Aronovich Tsadkin; 28 January 1888; Vitebsk, Russian Empire
- Died: 25 November 1967 (aged 79); Paris, France
- Resting place: Montparnasse Cemetery
- Citizenship: French (from 1921)
- Known for: Sculpture, painting, lithography
- Movement: Cubism, Art Deco, School of Paris

Signature
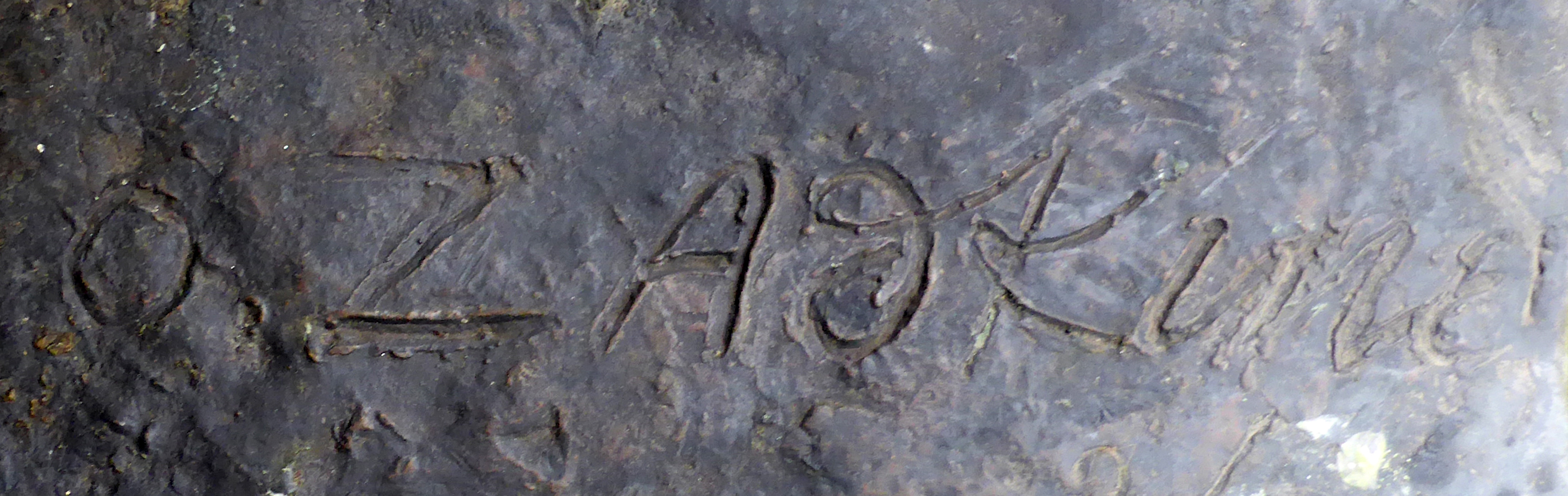

Ossip Alexeevich Zadkine (né Yossel Aronovich Tsadkin; Russian: Осип Алексеевич Цадкин, romanized: Osip Alekseyevich Tsadkin; 28 January 1888 – 25 November 1967) was a Russian and French sculptor, painter, lithographer and representative of the School of Paris.

== Early years and education ==
Yossel Aronovich Tsadkin (Russian: Иосель Аронович Цадкин) was born on 28 January 1888 in Vitebsk, the capital of Vitebsk Governorate in the Russian Empire (present-day, Belarus). He was born to a baptized Jewish father and a mother named Zippa-Dvoyra, who he claimed to be of Scottish origin. Archival materials state that Iosel-Shmuila Aronovich Tsadkin was of Jewish faith and studied in the Vitebsk City Technical School between 1900 and 1904. He also studied in the art school of Yury Pen with future artist Marc Chagall (then Movsha Shagal), as well as Victor Mekler (then Avigdor Mekler). Archival materials contradict Zadkine himself and states that his father did not convert to the Russian Orthodox religion and his mother was not of a Scottish extraction. He had five siblings: sisters Mira, Roza and Fania and brothers Mark and Moses.

Zadkine claimed in his memoir that at the age of 15 he had been sent by his father to Sunderland in the north of England, to stay with distant Scottish relatives and learn some "good manners". However, recent research has discovered that he ran away from home with a younger brother, and ended up living in Sunderland with the family of his paternal uncle, Joseph Zadkin, who had himself emigrated from Belarus a few years previously. In Sunderland he took art classes in Sunderland Town Hall and was taught to use a chisel by his uncle who was a cabinetmaker. He then moved to London and attended lessons at the Regent Street Polytechnic where he won a prize for modelling in 1908 but considered the teachers to be too conservative.

Zadkine settled in Paris in 1910. He studied at the École des Beaux-Arts for six months. In 1911, he lived and worked in La Ruche. While in Paris, he joined the Cubist movement, working in a Cubist idiom from 1914 to 1925. He later developed his own style, one that was strongly influenced by African and Greek art.

== Career ==
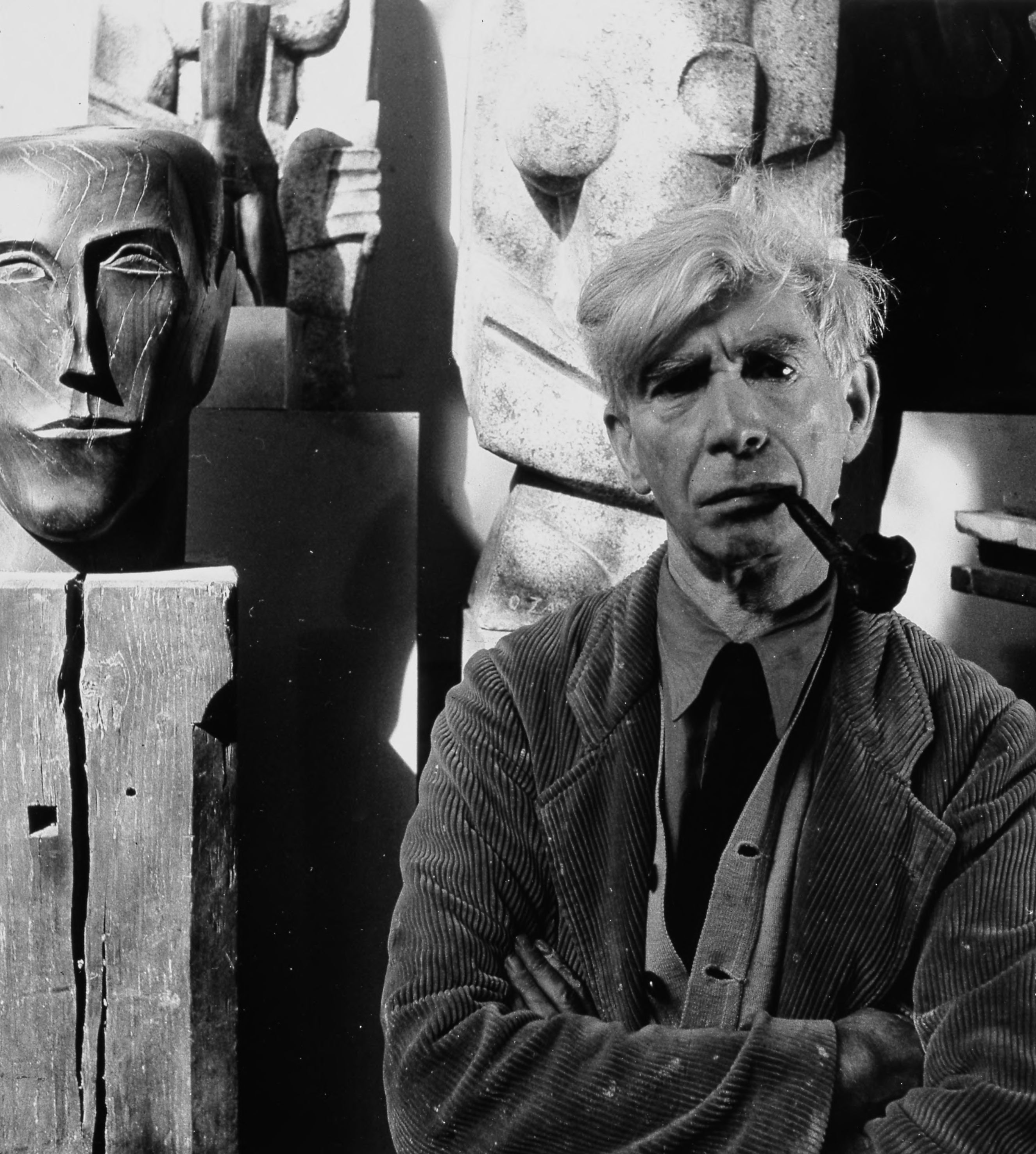
Zadkine with his sculpture

In 1921 he obtained French citizenship. Zadkine served as a stretcher-bearer in the French Army during World War I, and was wounded in action. He spent World War II in the US. His best-known work is probably the sculpture The Destroyed City (1951–1953), representing a man without a heart, a memorial to the destruction of the center of the Dutch city of Rotterdam in 1940 by the Nazi-German Luftwaffe.

He taught sculpture classes at Académie de la Grande Chaumière until 1958; his students included Dolores Lolo Soldevilla (1901–1971), Basil Rakoczi (1908–1979), Geula Dagan (1925–2008), Gunnar Aagaard Andersen, and Genevieve Pezet.

== Death and legacy ==
Zadkine died in Paris in 1967 at the age of 79 after undergoing abdominal surgery and was interred in the Cimetière du Montparnasse.

=== Museums ===
His former home and studio in Montparnasse is now the Musée Zadkine. When his former wife Prax died, she donated the house and art studio to the City of Paris for the formation of Musée Zadkine.

There is also a Musée Zadkine in the village of Les Arques in the Midi-Pyrénées region of France. Zadkine lived in Les Arques for a number of years, and while there, carved an enormous Christ on the Cross and Pieta that are featured in the 12th-century church which stands opposite the museum.

=== Students ===
Ossip Zadkine was a highly influential teacher whose career spanned several decades and continents. He was known for encouraging his pupils to move beyond rigid academicism to find their own "lyrical and expressive" style.

== Personal life ==
In August 1920, Zadkine married Valentine Prax (1897–1981), an Algerian-born painter of Sicilian and French-Catalan descent. Prax and Zadkine had no children.

Zadkine was a neighbor in Montparnasse and a friend of Henry Miller and was represented by the character "Borowski" in Miller's novel, Tropic of Cancer (1934). His other neighbors there included Chaïm Soutine, and Tsuguharu Foujita.

While living in Manhattan during wartime from 1942 to 1945, Zadkine had a relationship with American artist Carol Janeway and created several portraits of her.

The artist's only child, Nicolas Hasle (born 1960), was born after an affair with a Danish woman, Annelise Hasle. Since 2009, Hasle, a psychiatrist, who had been acknowledged by the artist and had his parentage legally established in France in the 1980s, has been party to a lawsuit with the City of Paris to establish his claim to his father's estate.

== Awards ==
- 1950 Venice Biennale sculpture prize
- 1961 Grand Prix National des Arts

== Legacy ==
- A school in Rotterdam was named after Zadkine.

== Gallery ==
Maternité, 1913, painted elmwood, 81 cm, exhibited at the 1914 Salon des Indépendants, Paris, Published in Montjoie, 1914

Femme au violon (Woman with a Violin), 1918 photograph by Pierre Choumoff

Venus, 1920, published in Action: Cahiers individualistes de philosophie et d'art, Volume 1, Number 4, July 1920

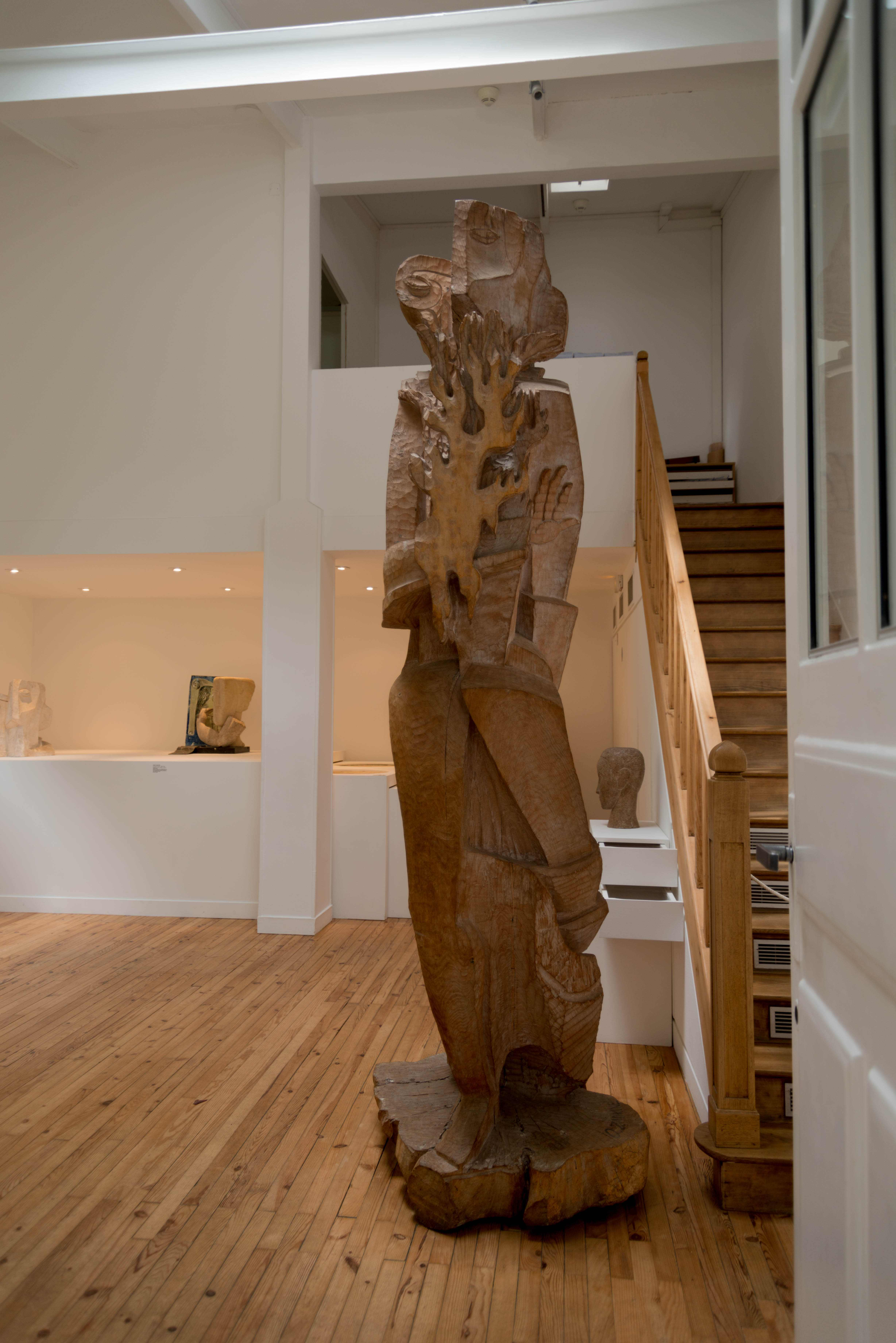
Prometheus, c. 1930–1940, wooden sculpture

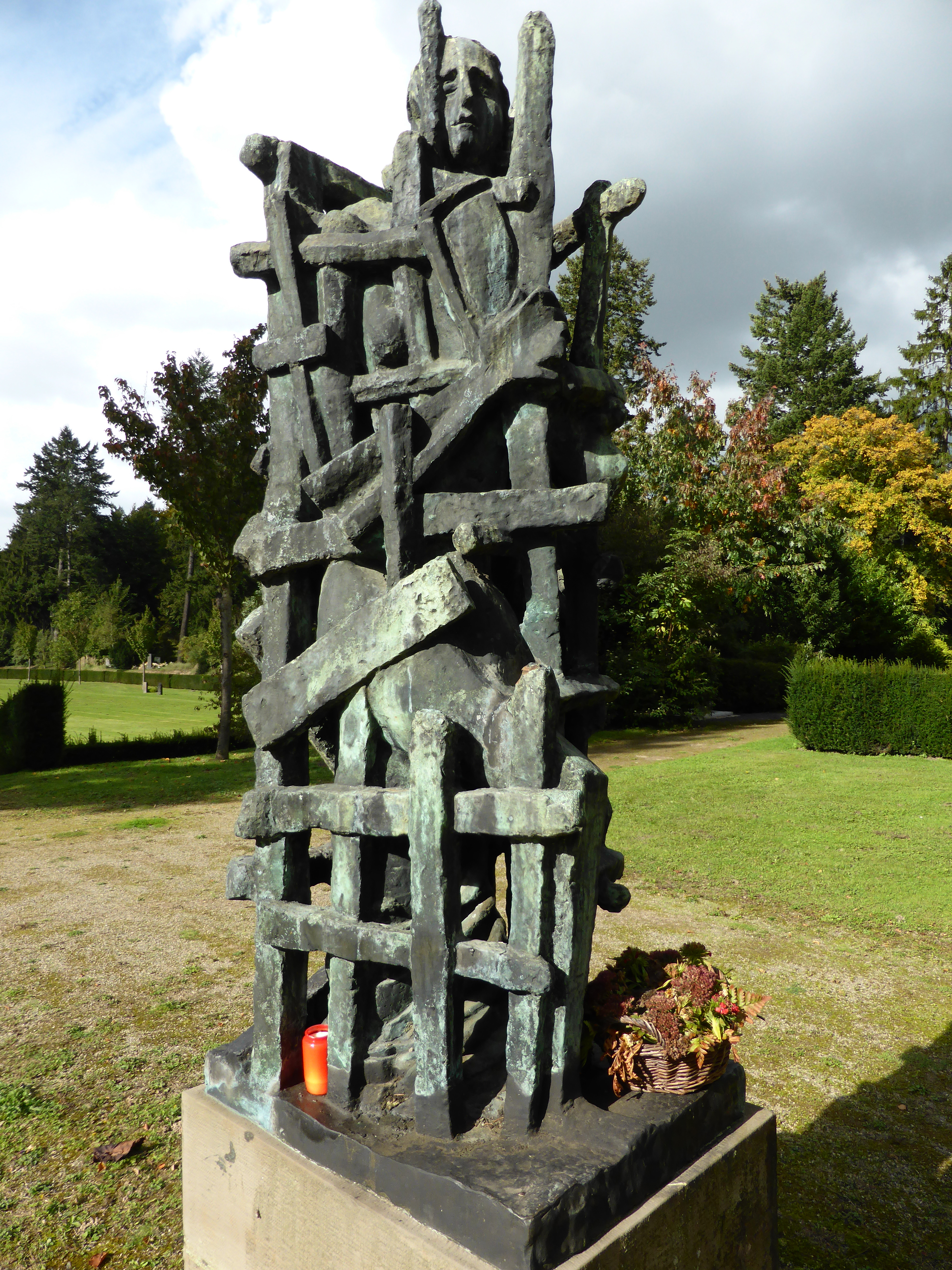
The prisoners (Die Gefangenen), 1943, bronze sculpture

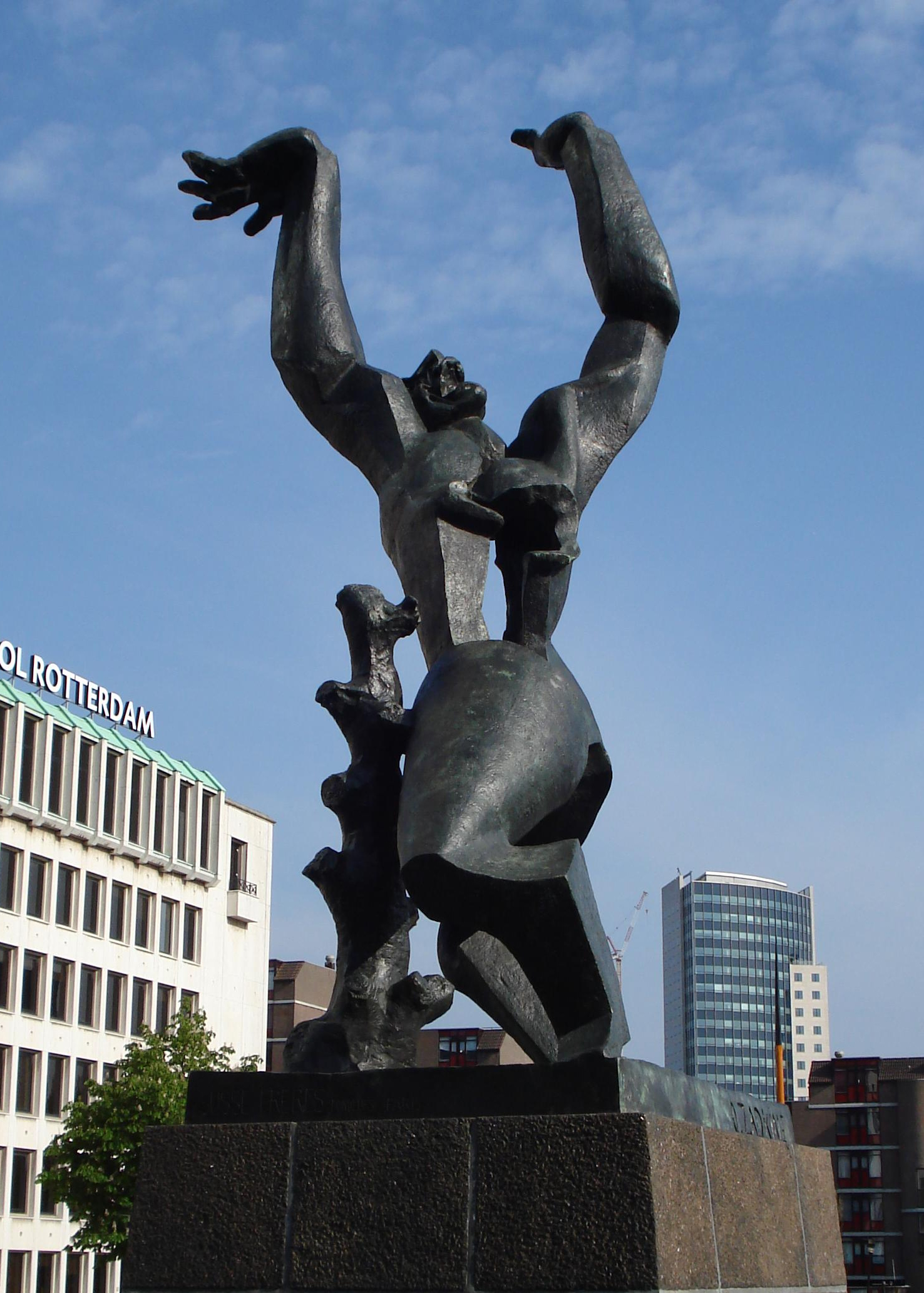
The Destroyed City (De Verwoeste Stad), 1951–53, bronze sculpture in Rotterdam, which is now a registered monument.

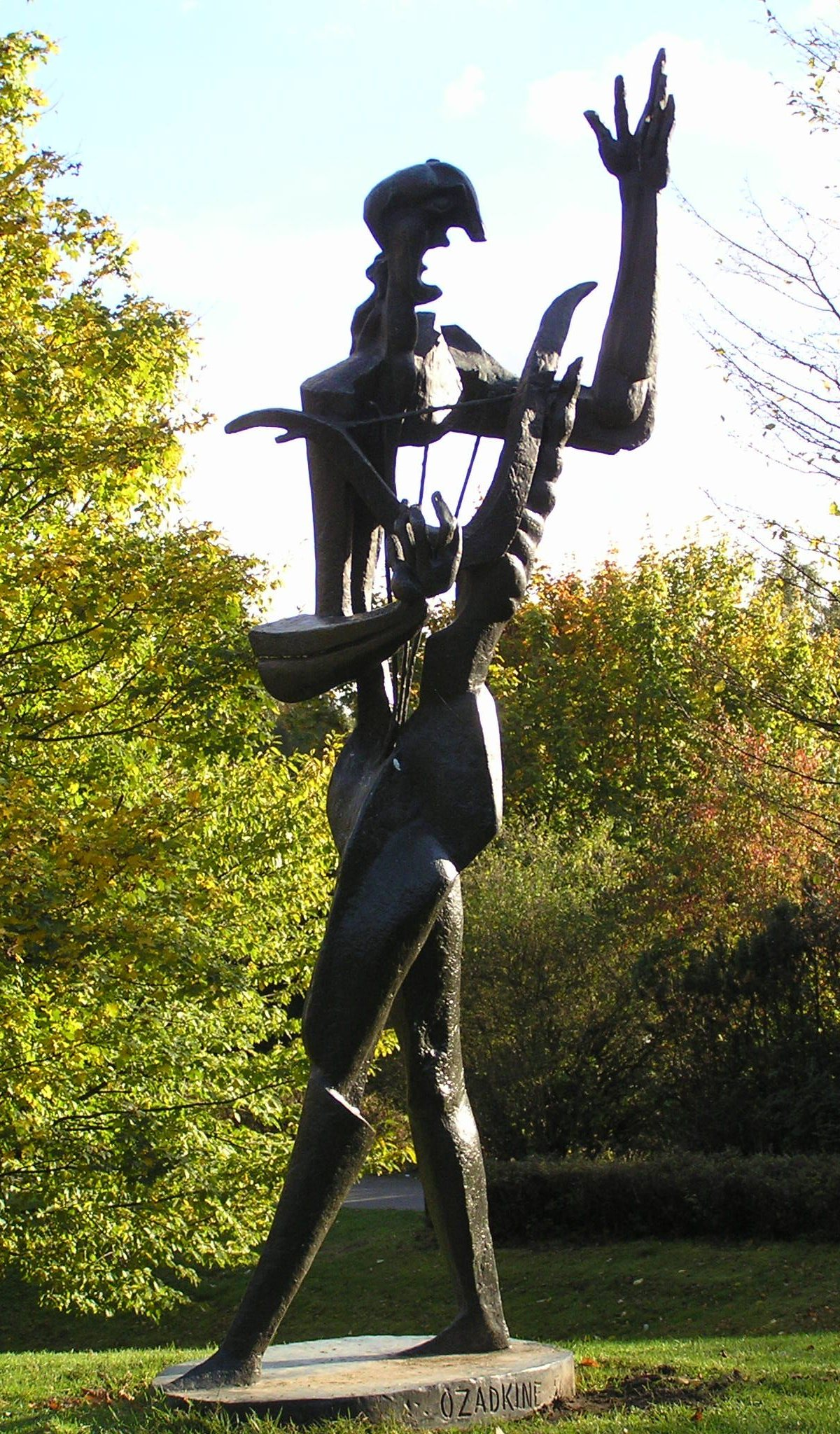
Orpheus, 1956, bronze sculpture

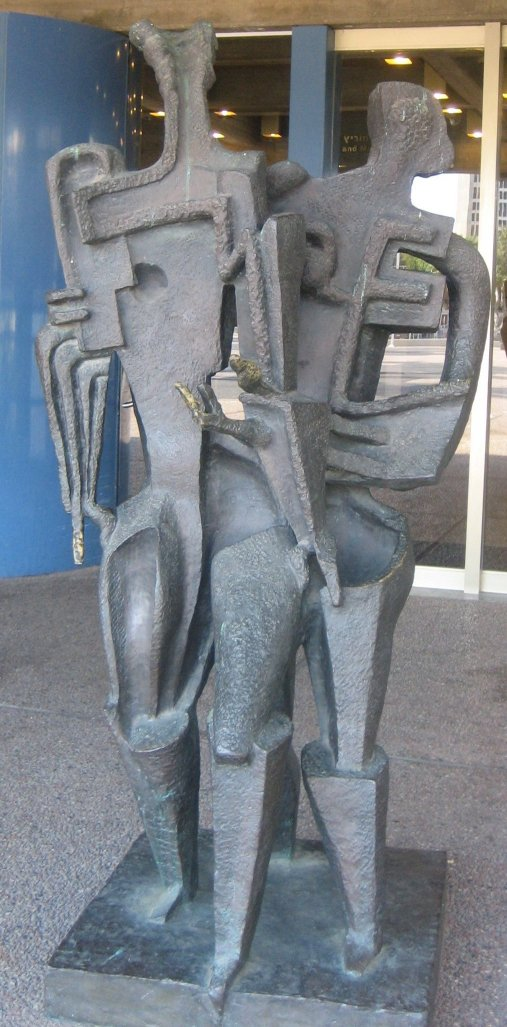
Lotophage, 1961–62, bronze sculpture, Tel Aviv Museum of Art, Tel Aviv

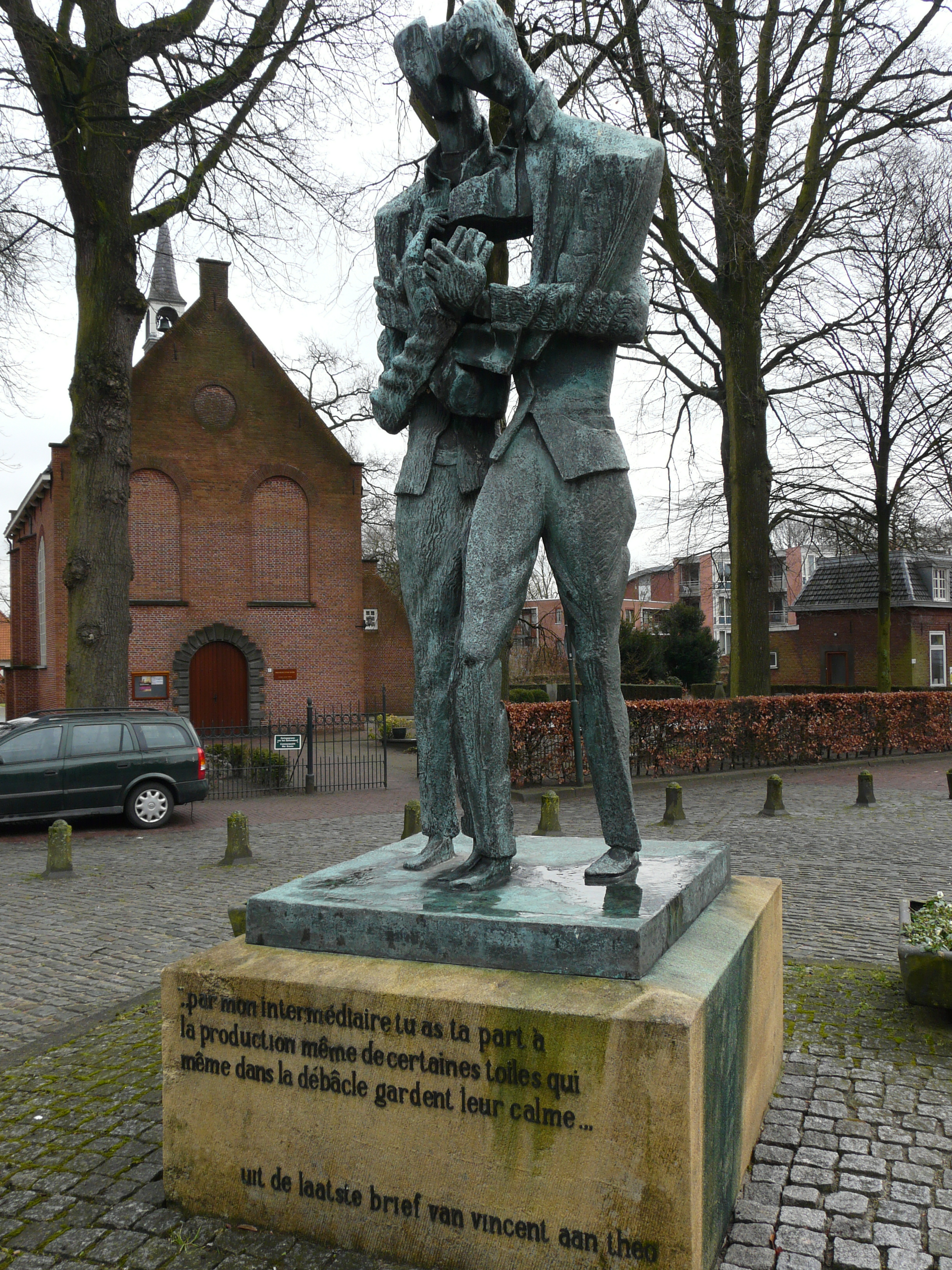
Vincent and Theo van Gogh, 1963–64, bronze sculpture, in Zundert, The Netherlands

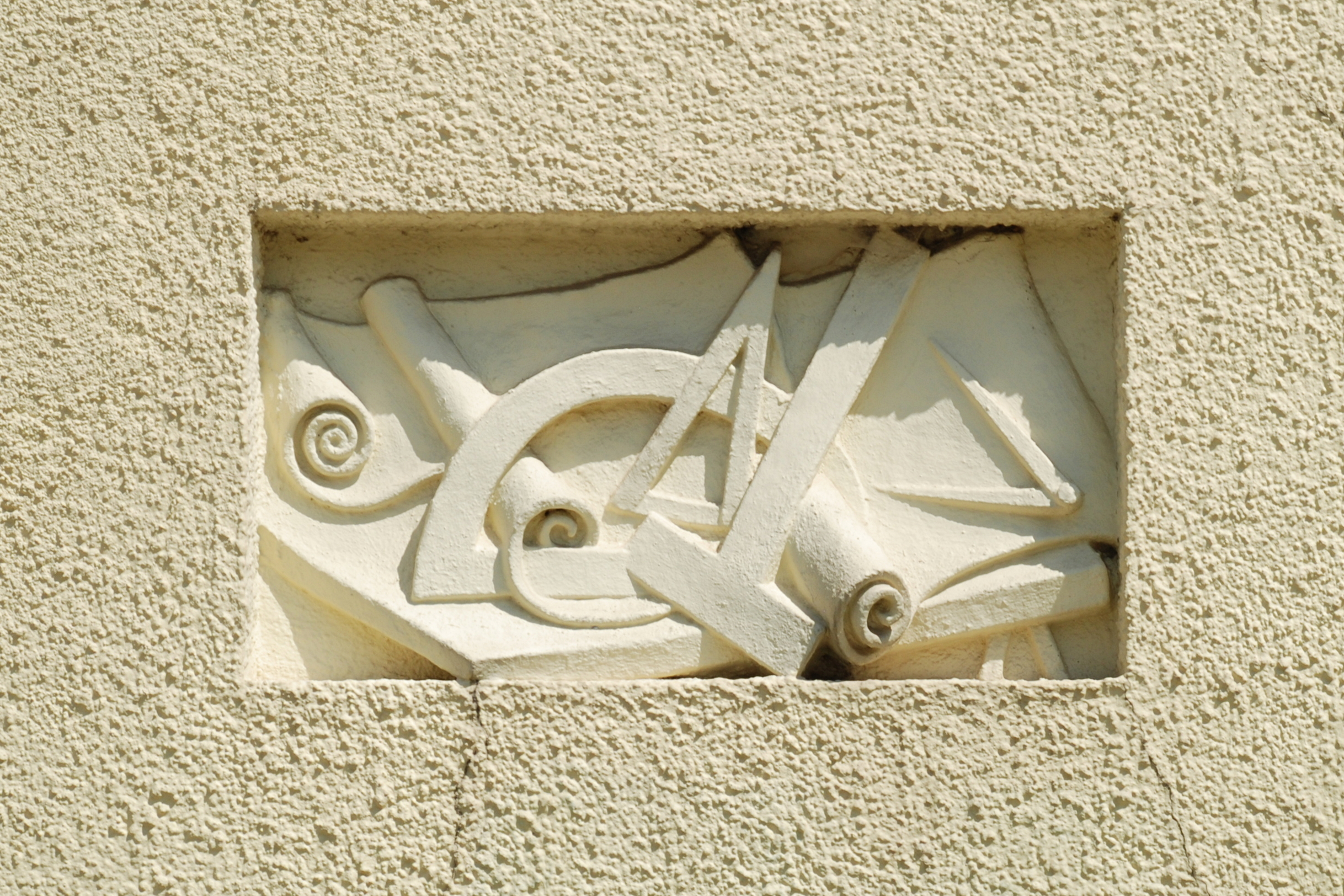
Bas-relief of the Blomme House in Brussels representing the architect's instruments

== Public collections ==
Among the public collections holding works by Ossip Zadkine are:

- Los Angeles County Museum of Art, Los Angeles
- Musée Zadkine, Paris
- Museum de Fundatie, Zwolle, Netherlands
- Museum of Modern Art, New York City
- National Gallery of Art, Washington, D.C.
- Tate Gallery, London
- Tel Aviv Museum of Art, Israel
- Van Abbemuseum, Eindhoven, Netherlands
- Museum JAN, Amstelveen, Netherlands
- The Sainsbury Centre, Norwich, England

== See also ==
- Musée Zadkine
- Rue Zadkine
