= The Destroyed City =

Sculpture in Rotterdam, Netherlands

Coordinates: 51.9176°N 4.4831°E

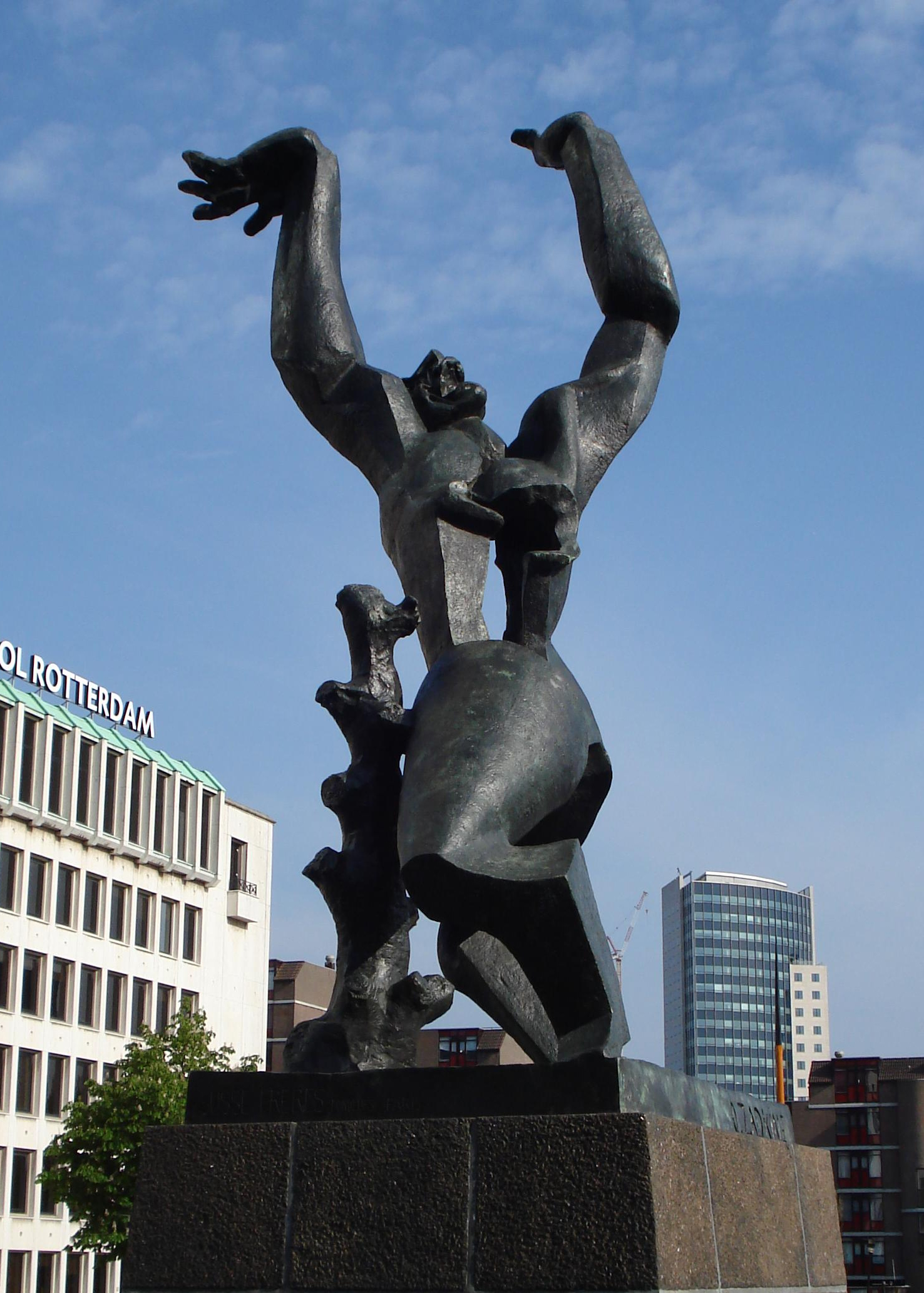
The Destroyed City (De verwoeste stad) in 2007

The Destroyed City (Dutch: De verwoeste stad) is a bronze memorial sculpture in the Dutch city of Rotterdam. It commemorates the German bombing of Rotterdam on 14 May 1940, which destroyed the medieval centre of the city. Unveiled in 1953, it was designated as a Dutch national monument (Rijksmonument) in 2010. It is the largest sculpture by the Russian-born French sculptor Ossip Zadkine, his best known work, and the best known sculpture in Rotterdam.

The 6.5 m (21 ft) high sculpture depicts a stylized human figure leaning against a tree stump. The figure holds both hands aloft, with its head thrown back as if crying in grief, and a gaping hole in its chest and abdomen. The absence of a heart is said to symbolise the destruction of the centre of Rotterdam. Zadkine described it as "A cry of horror against the inhuman brutality of this act of tyranny". The sculpture has been compared to the figure with arms raised in terror on the far right of Picasso's painting Guernica. It stands on a tapering 2 m (6 ft 7 in) high plinth of Labrador granite blocks (reportedly, the stone had been intended for a sculpture of Adolf Hitler in Berlin). It is sited on the north side of the early 17th century dock basin of Leuvehaven in the centre of Rotterdam.

Zadkine's work was influenced by Rodin and by Cubism. He was inspired to create the sculpture shortly after the end of the Second World War, probably 1946 or 1947, when his train passed through the ruined centre of Rotterdam while travelling from Paris to visit his friend, the doctor and painter Hendrik Wiegersma, in the Dutch town of Deurne. Zadkine created a 70 cm (28 in) high model in terracotta, intended as a memorial to the victims of war, which was exhibited in Berlin and Prague in 1947. The terracotta was damaged in transit, so Zadkine created a new model in plaster about 140 cm (55 in) high, which was exhibited in Brussels and at the Stedelijk Museum Amsterdam in 1948. Zadkine was commissioned to create a full-size sculpture in bronze by Gerrit van der Wal, the managing director of the De Bijenkorf chain of Dutch department stores, whose Rotterdam store was heavily damaged in the German bombing in 1940. A bronze model was exhibited at the Museum Boijmans Van Beuningen in Rotterdam in December 1949.

The full-size bronze sculpture was created from 1951 to 1953 and cast by the Susse Frères foundry in Paris. It was presented to the city as an anonymous gift, on condition that its location should be chosen by Zadkine, and it should remain permanently in place; the identity of the donor became known in 1978. The modern sculpture was controversial, with the objections of Jan Tillema, director of Rotterdam's Department of Public Works (Gemeentewerken Rotterdam), published in the Katholiek Bouwblad. Tillema condemned the sculpture as a "madly demonic scourge" that would "paralyze the heart of my city forever". Despite his objections, ultimately the gift was accepted, and Tillema was responsible for designing the plinth. The statue was donated, but installation, including the plinth, cost 24,500 guilders.

It was unveiled by Jacoba van Walsum, wife of Gerard van Walsum, the mayor or Rotterdam, on 15 May 1953 on Plein 1940, where it stands nowadays outside the Maritime Museum Rotterdam. It was moved approximately 60 m (200 ft) from its original position in 1975. It was restored while temporarily removed in 2005 to allow construction works, and returned to its place in 2007. It was registered as a Rijksmonument (number 530902) in 2010. A proposal made in 2014 to move the sculpture again to a prominent position outside the new Rotterdam Centraal station was soon abandoned.

It has received many nicknames from the residents of Rotterdam, including "Stad zonder Hart" (City without a heart), "Zadkini", “Jan Gat” (Jan Hole) and "Jan met de Handjes" (Jan with the little hands).

In February 2019, the sculpture and its emotional impact were discussed in the BBC Radio 4 programme Pen Pals.

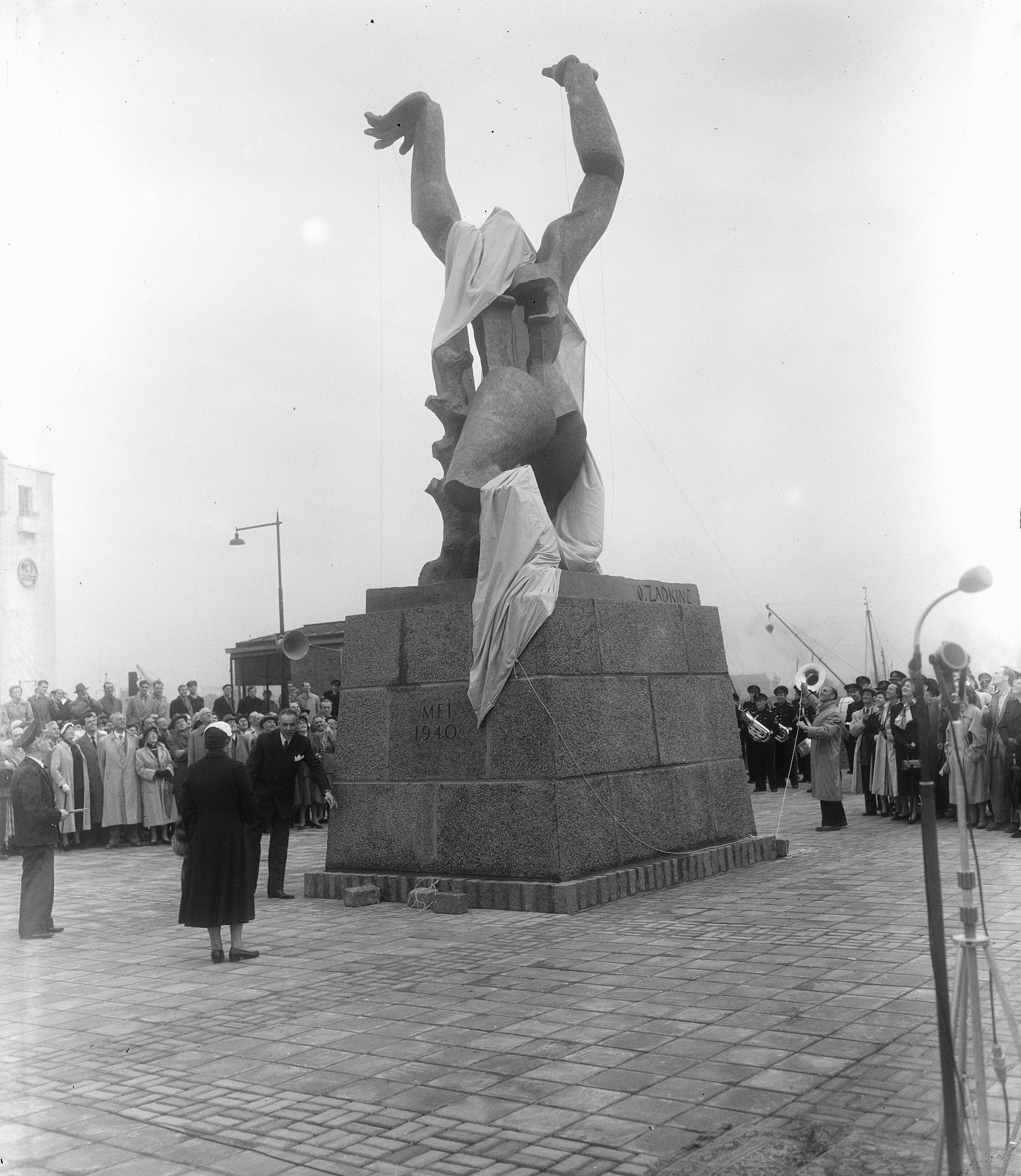
Unveiling in 1953

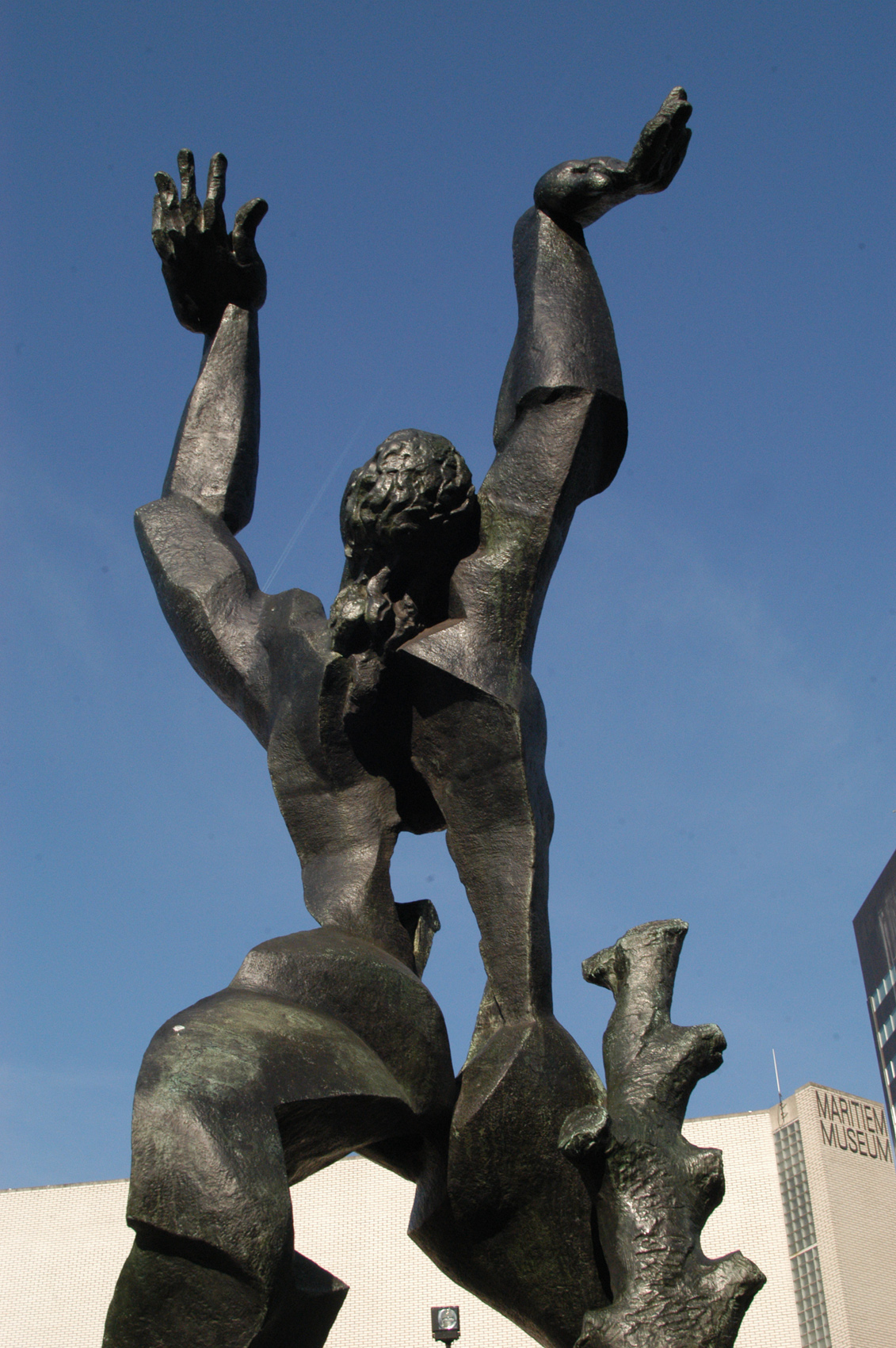
2005

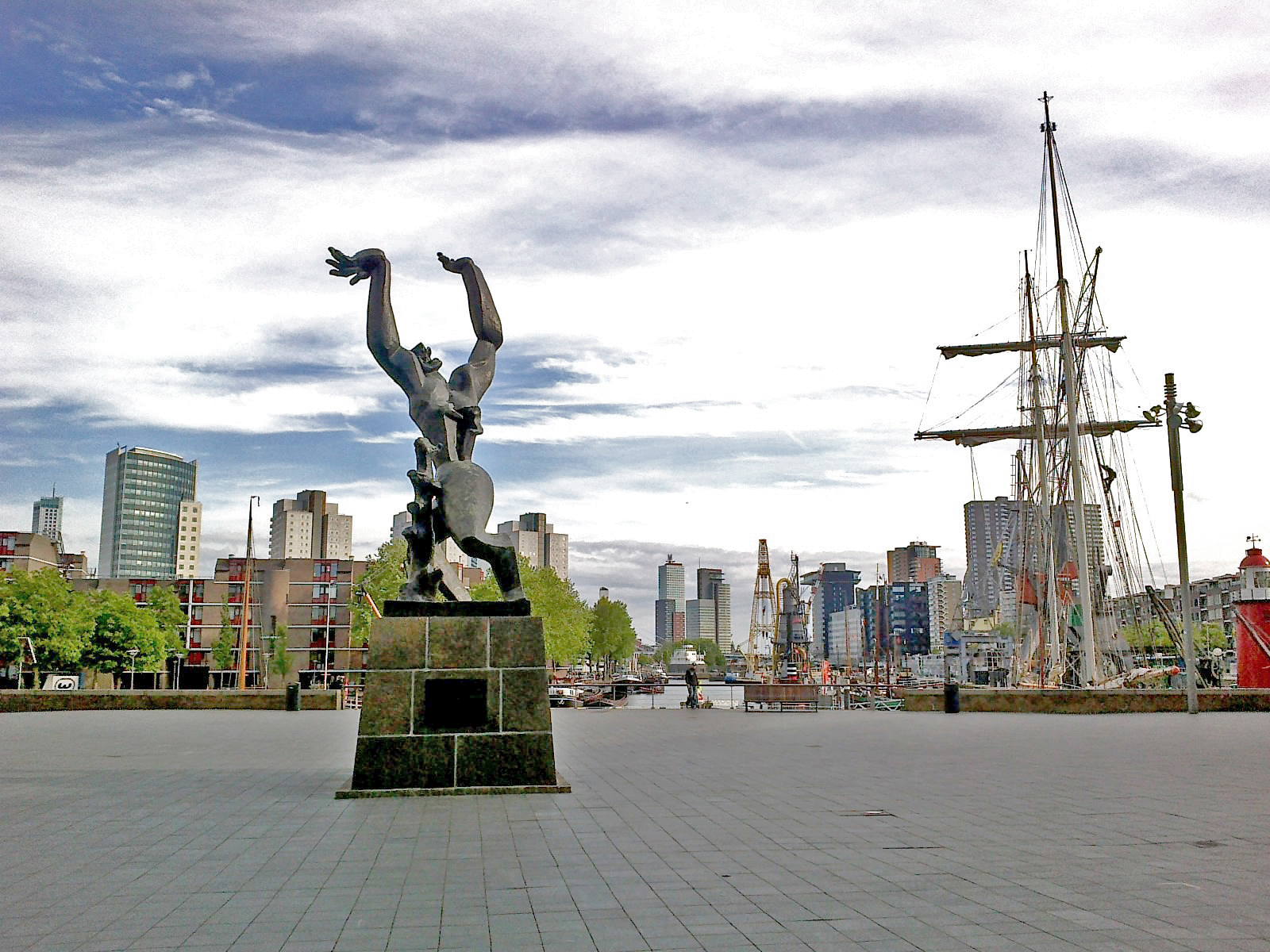
2015

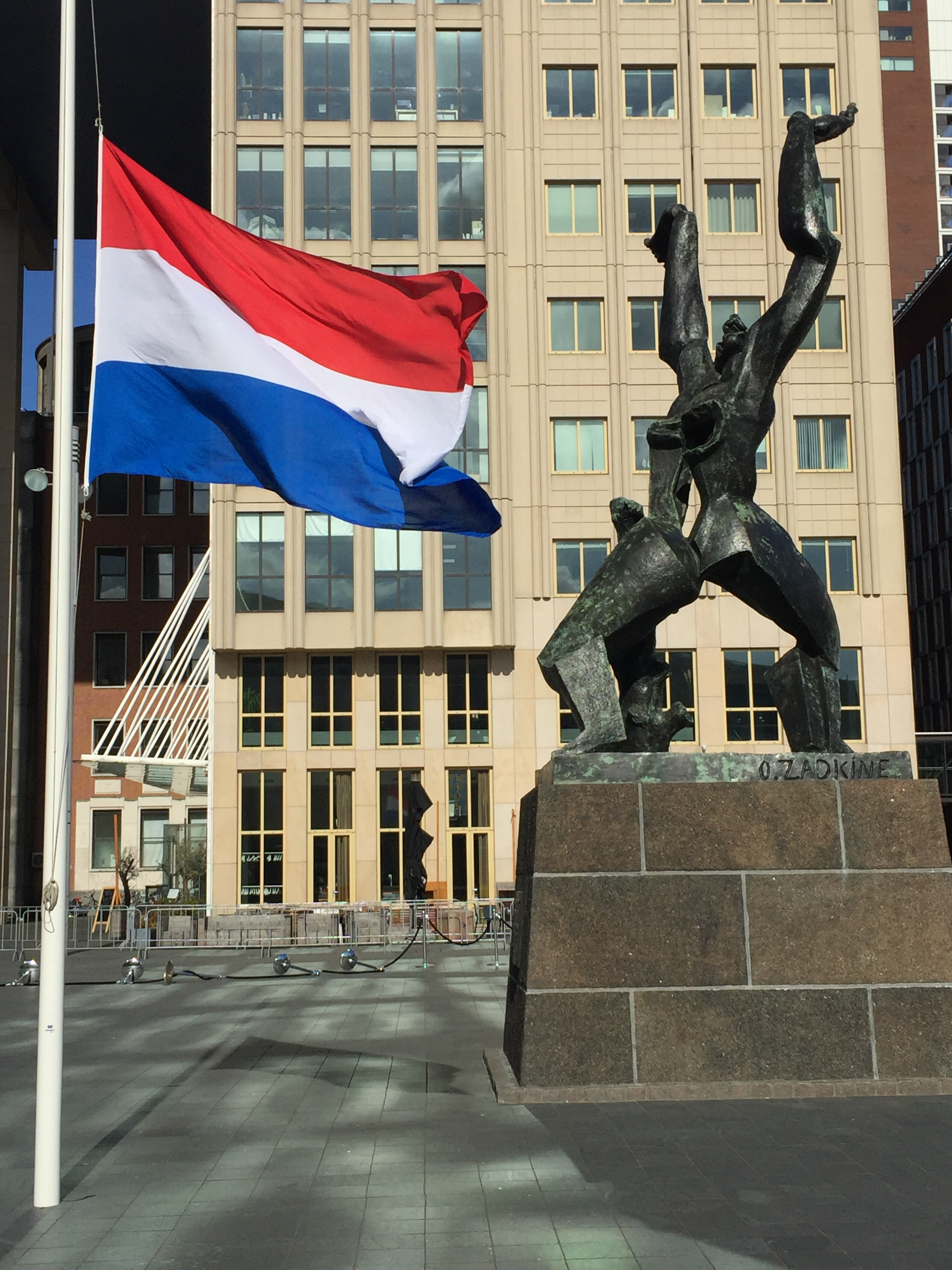
2019
