= Royal Plaza (Bangkok) =

Public square in palace and government quarter of Bangkok, Thailand

Coordinates: 13°46′8″N 100°30′44″E

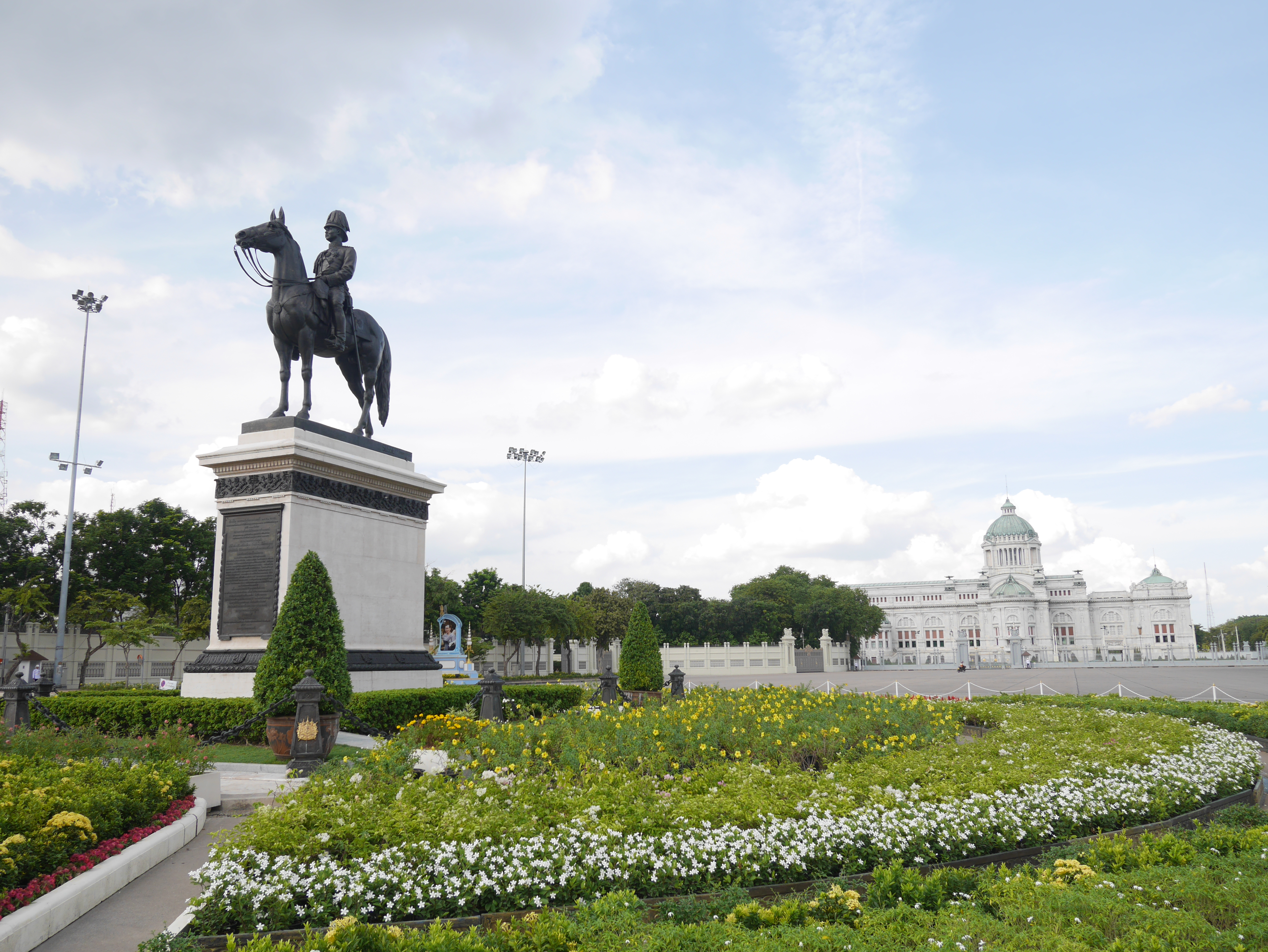
Equestrian statue of King Chulalongkorn at the Royal Plaza

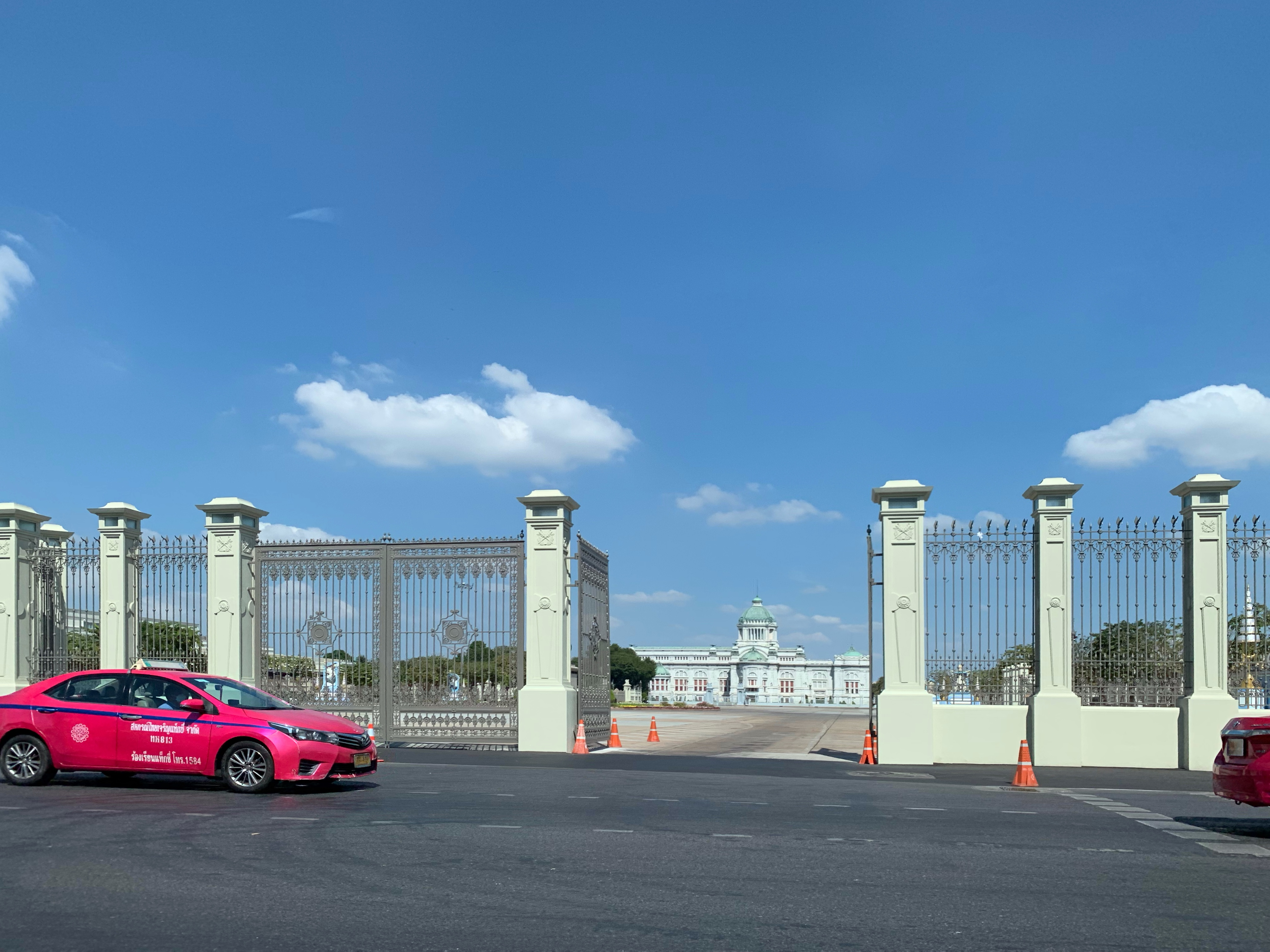
The Royal Plaza with a glimpse of Ananta Samakhom Throne Hall, completely sealed off by a fence as of 2022

The Royal Plaza, or formally Dusit Palace Plaza (Thai: ลานพระราชวังดุสิต; RTGS: Lan Phra Ratchawang Dusit), and also known among Thais as Equestrian Statue Plaza (Thai: ลานพระบรมรูปทรงม้า; RTGS: Lan Phra Borommarup Song Ma), is an important public square in the palace and government quarter of Bangkok, the capital of Thailand.

It is located in front of Ananta Samakhom Throne Hall in Dusit Palace, Dusit District, Bangkok, which was the former reception hall of the palace where King Chulalongkorn (Rama V; r. 1868–1910) once lived, and was later used as the first parliament building. At the center of the plaza is the Equestrian statue of King Chulalongkorn, the "Great beloved king". The square is rectangular shaped, about 500 metres long and 150 metres wide.

The Royal Plaza forms the northeastern end of Ratchadamnoen Avenue that presents a 1.5-km long vista towards it and links the plaza with the Sanam Luang and the Grand Palace in Bangkok's old town. Next to the plaza is Suan Amporn Park, the venue of the annual Red Cross Fair. On the northern corner of the square is Amphorn Sathan Residential Hall, the primary residence of current King Vajiralongkorn, on its southwestern edge is Paruskavan Palace which hosts the headquarters of National Intelligence Agency and Metropolitan Police Bureau. To its south is the headquarters of the Royal Thai Army's 1st army region. Dusit Zoo is also located near the plaza.

It is often used for rallies, parades and ceremonies, for instance students of Chulalongkorn University traditionally celebrate their graduation on this square.

== History ==
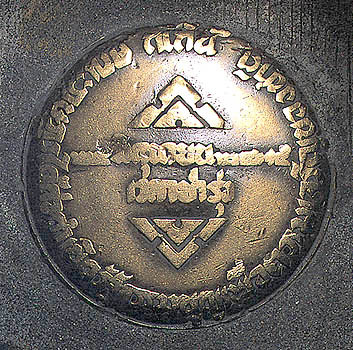
Siamese revolution commemoration plaque, removed in 2017

The Equestrian Statue of King Chulalongkorn the Great was erected in 1908 two years before his death from a fund raised by the Thai people. The statue was cast in Paris by Georges Saulo, a French craftsman well known at that time. The remainder of the fund was spent by King Rama VI on the establishment of Chulalongkorn University, which was named after the eponymous king.

On 24 June 1932, the plaza and the throne hall witnessed one of the most important events in Thai history as the People's Party staged a bloodless revolution that transformed the country from absolute monarchy to democratic constitutional monarchy. The plaza was the rally site for People's Party supporters demanding the constitution. The first permanent constitution was ceremoniously granted in the Ananta Samakhom Throne Hall on 10 December 1932.

The plaza has frequently been used for rallies organised by the government or palace as well as civil protests throughout the Thai history. On 6 October 1976, the day of Thammasat University massacre, some 30,000 adherents of the right-wing Village Scouts movement rallied here, calling to "Kill the communists, kill the three leftist ministers, defend nation—religion—monarchy", until they were dispersed by then Crown Prince Vajiralongkorn after the military had seized power.

The Royal Plaza was also one of the sites of the May 1992 mass protests against a purportedly illegitimate government, that led into the violent "Black May" unrest. In February 2006 tens of thousands supporters of the People's Alliance for Democracy (also known as "yellow shirts") gathered to protest against Prime minister Thaksin Shinawatra. In June of the same year, up to a million Thai subjects assembled here to celebrate the diamond throne jubilee of King Bhumibol Adulyadej.

A brass plaque, 30 centimeters in diameter, commemorating the Siamese revolution of 1932 was embedded in the pavement next to the statue. It was removed during the dictatorial rule of Prime minister Sarit Thanarat (1959–63) but later reinstated. Under the military rule of Prayut Chan-o-cha, it disappeared again in April 2017 and was replaced by a plaque that highlights the importance of the monarchy without any reference to the revolution or constitution. The government refused any explanation for this exchange.

In 2022, The Royal Plaza was completely sealed off by a fence. As a result, the area was included as part of the Dusit Palace.

== See also ==
- Dusit Palace
- Equestrian statue of King Chulalongkorn
