= Musée Zadkine =

Museum in Paris, France

Coordinates: 48°50′34″N 2°20′01″E

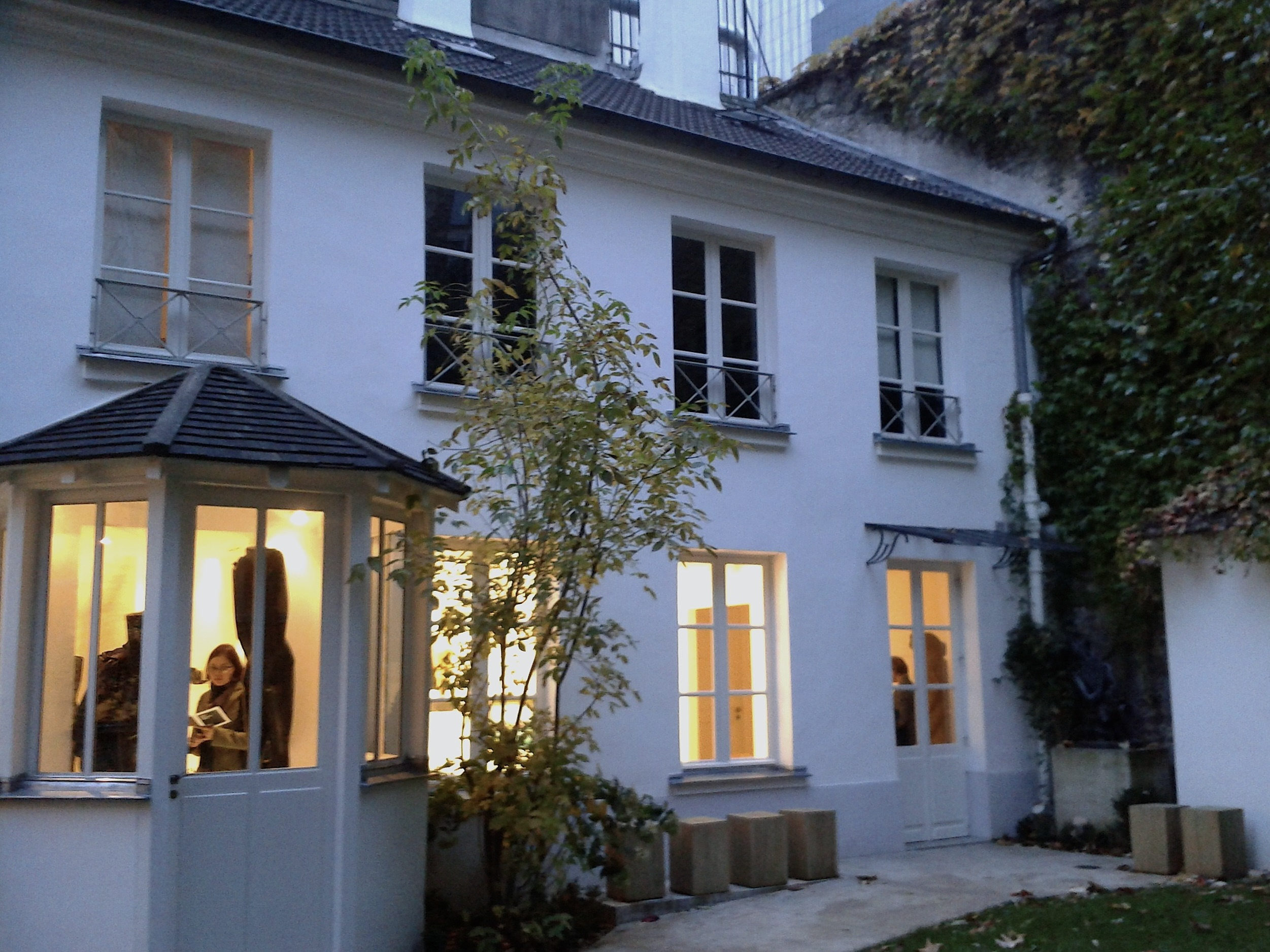
Musée Zadkine

The Musée Zadkine is a museum dedicated to the work of Russian sculptor Ossip Zadkine (1890–1967). It is located near the Jardin du Luxembourg in the 6th arrondissement at 100 bis, rue d'Assas, Paris, France, and open daily except Monday; an admission fee is only charged during exhibitions. The museum also contains a fine garden, with no charge for entry. The nearest métro and RER stations are Port-Royal and Vavin.

The museum was established by Valentine Prax, Zadkine's wife, who willed their home and studio since 1928, as well as his personal collection, to the City of Paris. The museum was inaugurated in 1982 following her death, and has subsequently augmented its collection through purchases. It now contains about 300 sculptures, as well as drawings, photographs, and tapestries. Since 1995 the museum has also presented 3 to 4 exhibits of contemporary art each year.

The Museum underwent renovations in 2012 to ensure its accessibility to all visitors. It re-opened its doors for its thirtieth anniversary on October 10, 2012. The new museography was designed to more closely reflect the spirit of the workshop.

Zadkine Museum is one of the 14 City of Paris' Museums that have been incorporated since January 1, 2013 in the public institution Paris Musées.

== See also ==
- List of museums in Paris
