= Les Arques =

- Commune
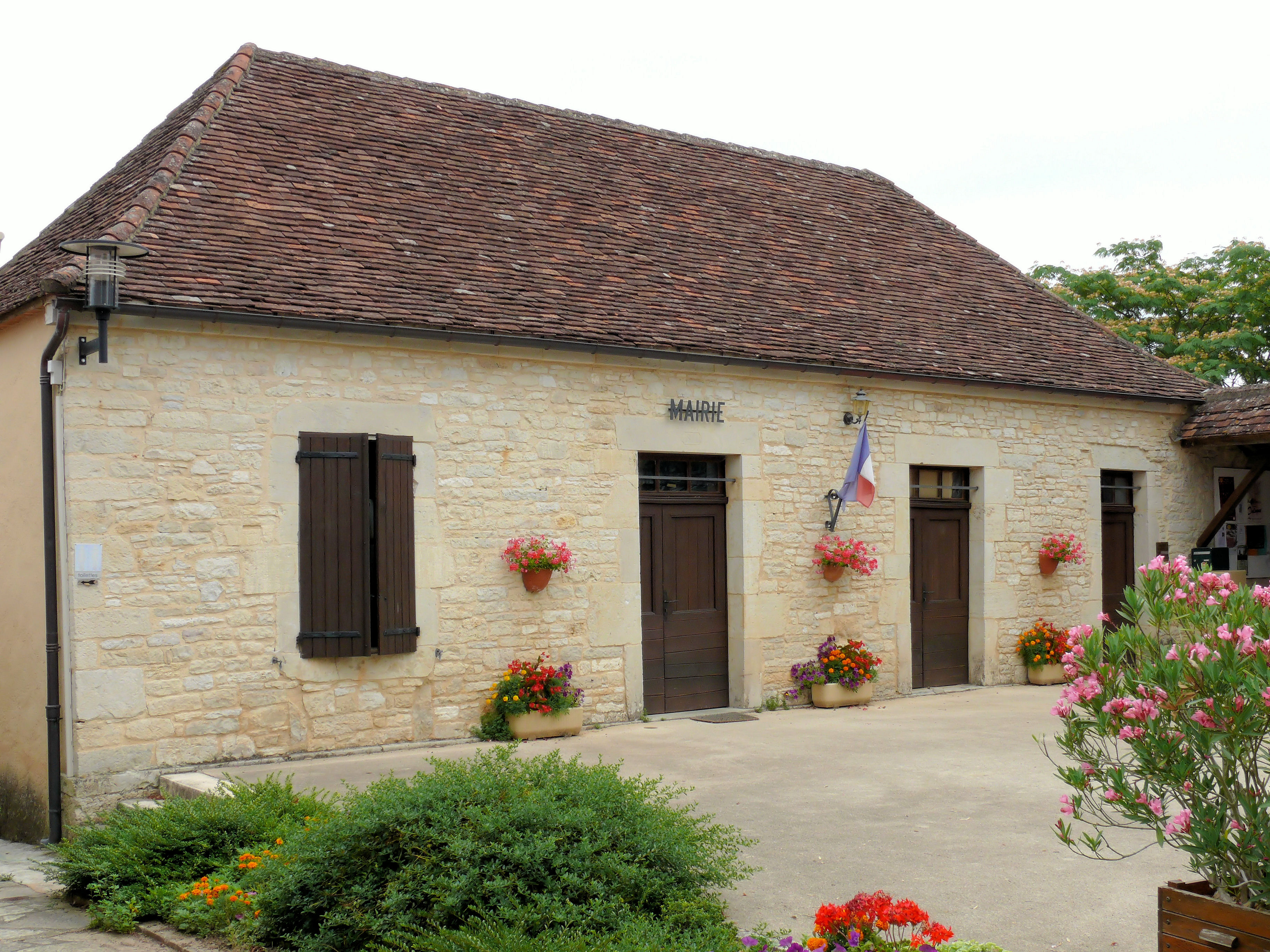
- The town hall in Les Arques
- Location of Les Arques
- Location within France Location within Occitanie
- Coordinates: 44°36′11″N 1°15′05″E
- Country: France
- Region: Occitania
- Department: Lot
- Arrondissement: Gourdon
- Canton: Puy-l'Évêque
- Intercommunality: CC Cazals-Salviac

Government
  - Mayor (2020–2026): Jérôme Bonafous
- Area^{1}: 15.05 km^{2} (5.81 sq mi)
- Elevation: 254 m (833 ft)
- Highest elevation: 325 m (1,066 ft)
- Lowest elevation: 145 m (476 ft)
- Population (2023): 214
  - Density: 14.2/km^{2} (36.8/sq mi)
- Time zone: UTC+01:00 (CET)
  - Summer (DST): UTC+02:00 (CEST)
- INSEE/Postal code: 46008 /46250
- ^{1} French Land Register data, which excludes lakes, ponds, glaciers > 1 km^{2} (0.386 sq mi or 247 acres) and river estuaries.

Les Arques (French pronunciation: [le.z‿aʁk]; Occitan: Las Arcas) is a commune in the Lot department in southwestern France.

== Population ==
Historical population
| Year | Pop. | ±% p.a. |
|---|---|---|
| 1968 | 230 | — |
| 1975 | 177 | −3.67% |
| 1982 | 173 | −0.33% |
| 1990 | 160 | −0.97% |
| 1999 | 158 | −0.14% |
| 2007 | 172 | +1.07% |
| 2012 | 219 | +4.95% |
| 2017 | 195 | −2.29% |
| 2023 | 214 | +1.56% |
Source: INSEE

== See also ==
- Communes of the Lot department
