= Quercy =

- Natural region
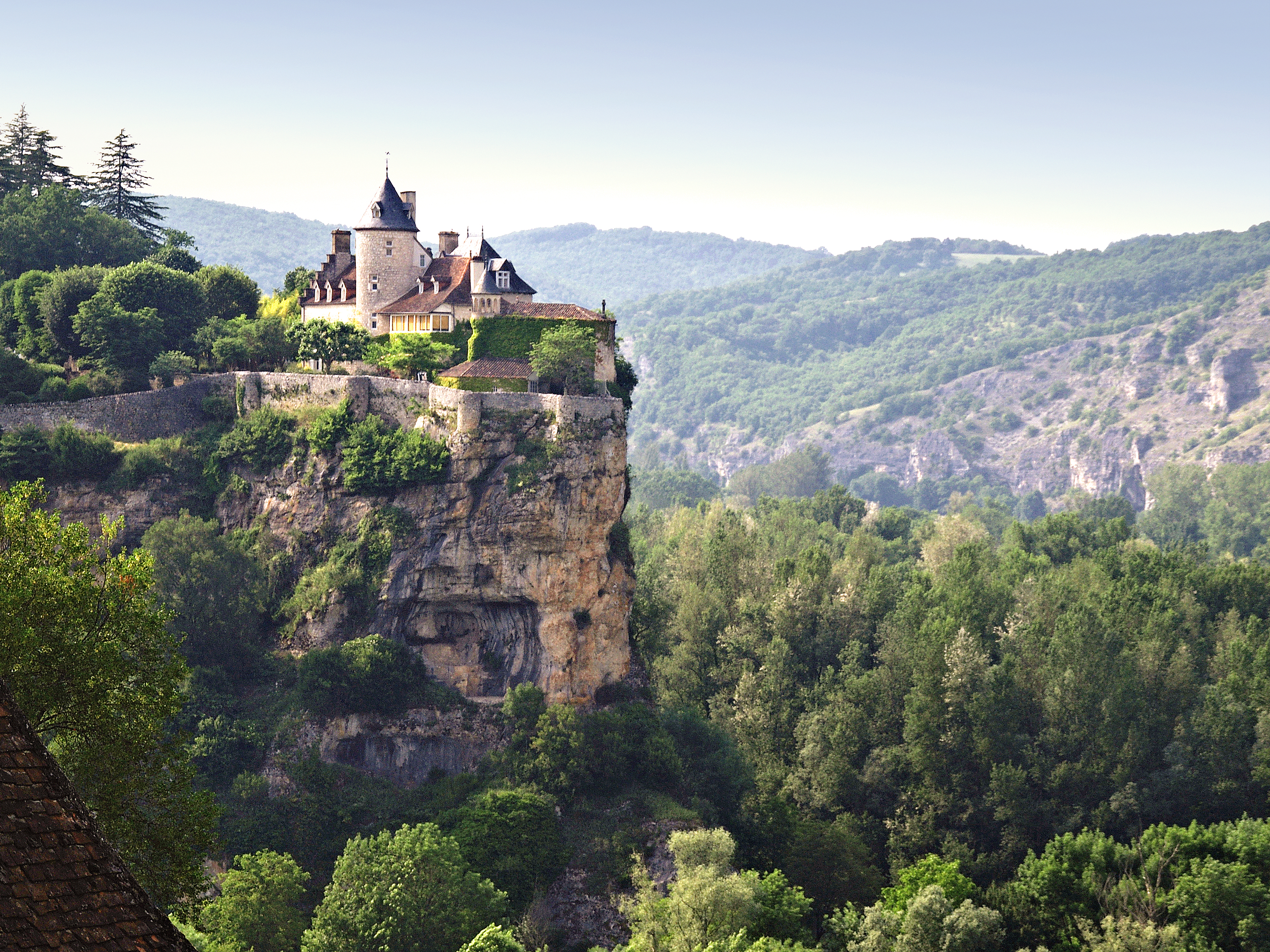
- The chateau in Lacave

- Coat of arms

- Map of the old province of Quercy, France, showing the communes according to the current administrative division.
- Coordinates: 44.2667°N 1.63333°E
- Countries: France

Quercy (French: [kɛʁsi]; Occitan: Carcin [kaɾˈsi], locally [kɔɾˈʃi]) is a former province of France located in the country's southwest, bounded on the north by Limousin, on the west by Périgord and Agenais, on the south by Gascony and Languedoc, and on the east by Rouergue and Auvergne.

== Description ==
Quercy comprised the present-day department of Lot, the northern half of the department of Tarn-et-Garonne, and a few communities in the departments of Dordogne, Corrèze, and Aveyron. The traditional capital of Quercy is Cahors, now the prefecture of Lot. The largest town of Quercy is Montauban, prefecture of Tarn-et-Garonne. However, Montauban lies at the traditional border between Quercy and Languedoc, in an area very different from the rest of Quercy, and it is closer historically and culturally to Toulouse and the rest of Languedoc, therefore it should be considered a special case, not totally part of Quercy. Also distinct from the rest of the region is the region known as Quercy Blanc, lying between Cahors and the southern boundary of Lot, and characterised by its white limestone buildings.

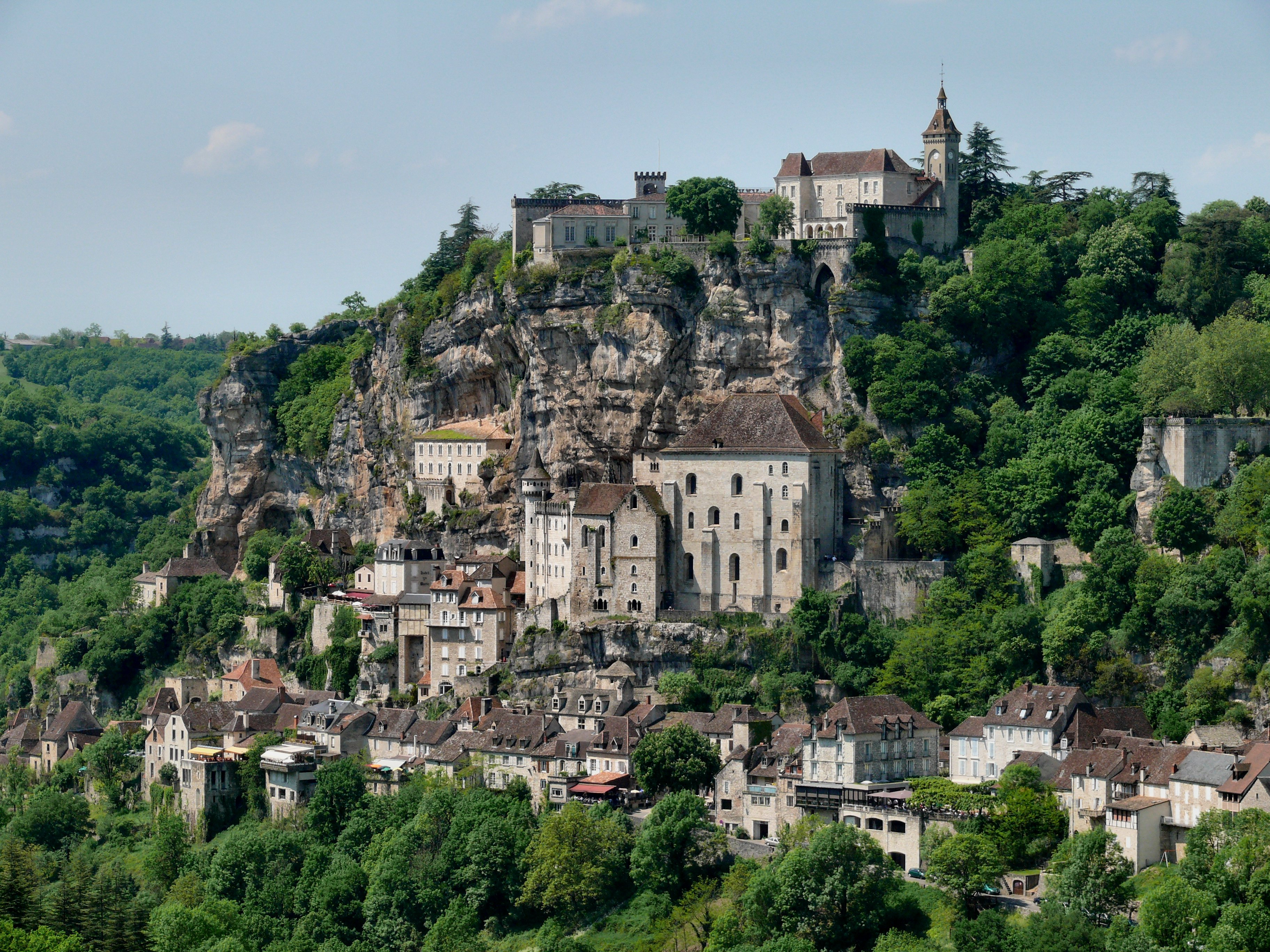
Close to Périgord and the Dordogne valley, Rocamadour is at the heart of the Parc naturel régional des Causses du Quercy regional nature park.

Quercy has a land area of 6,987 km^{2} (2,698 sq. miles). At the 1999 census there were 275,984 inhabitants on the territory of the former province of Quercy, which means a density of 40 inhabitants per square kilotmetre (102 inh. per sq. mile). However, if Montauban is not included in Quercy, then the total population of Quercy in 1999 was 224,129 inhabitants, and the density was only 33 inhabitants per square kilotmetre (85 inh. per sq. mile). The largest urban areas in Quercy are Montauban, with 51,855 inhabitants in 1999, Cahors, with 23,128 inhabitants in 1999, Moissac, with 12,321 inhabitants in 1999, and Figeac, with 9,991 inhabitants in 1999.

== History ==
Under the Romans, Quercy was part of Aquitania Prima. Christianity was introduced during the 4th century. Early in the 6th century it fell under the authority of the Franks, and in the 7th century became part of the autonomous Duchy of Aquitaine. At the end of the 10th century, its rulers were the powerful counts of Toulouse. During the wars between England and France in the reign of Henry II, the English placed garrisons in the county, and by the 1259 Treaty of Paris lower Quercy was ceded to England. The monarchs of both England and France confirmed and added to the privileges of the towns and the district, each thus hoping to attach the inhabitants to his own interest. In 1360, by the Treaty of Brétigny, the whole county passed to England, but in 1440 the English were finally expelled. In the 16th century Quercy was a stronghold of the Protestants, and the scene of a savage religious warfare. The civil wars of the reign of Louis XIII largely took place around Montauban.

== Notable associations ==
Like Périgord, the area is noted for its cuisine, more particularly the duck dishes, confit de canard and magret de canard and the dark red wines of Cahors and, further south, Coteaux de Quercy.

The province gave its name to cadurcum, a variety of light linen.

== Notable people ==
- John XXII (1316–1332), pope
- Jean Le Parisot de La Valette (1494–1568), Grand Master of the Order of Malta
- Clément Marot (1496–1544), poet
- Olivier de Magny (1529–1561), poet
- Etienne Henri d'Escayrac Lauture (1747–1791), counter-revolutionary
- Olympe de Gouges (1748–1793), playwright, abolitionist, and feminist activist, author of the 1791 Declaration of the Rights of Woman and of the Female Citizen
- Jean Bon Saint-André (1749–1813), Revolutionary
- Jean-Antoine Marbot (1754–1800), general of the French Army and politician
- Jean Auguste Dominique Ingres (1780–1867), Neoclassicist painter
- Adolphe Marbot (1781–1844), general of the French Army
- Marcellin Marbot (1782–1854), general of the French Army, author of the famous Memoirs of General Marbot
- André Étienne d'Audebert de Férussac (1786–1836), naturalist
- Évariste Régis Huc (1813–1860), missionary Catholic priest and traveler, famous for his accounts of China, Tartary and Tibet
- Stanislas d'Escayrac de Lauture (1822–1868), explorer who sought the headwaters of the Nile and wrote Memories of Sudan
- Léon Cladel (1834–1892), local writer of rustic stories about Quercy
- Léon Gambetta (1838–1882), politician
- Émile Pouvillon (1840–1906), another writer of rustic stories about Quercy
- Francis Maratuech (1853–1908), writer and poet, founded a monthly review in 1880, Le Feu Follet
- Antoine Bourdelle (1861–1929), sculptor
- Philippe Gaubert (1879–1941), conductor and composer
- Marcelle Bergerol (1901–1989), figurative painter
- Alfred Roques (1925–2004), rugby player
- Christian Signol (born 1947), writer
- Fabien Galthié (born 1969), rugby player
