= Log bridge =

Timber bridge made using logs

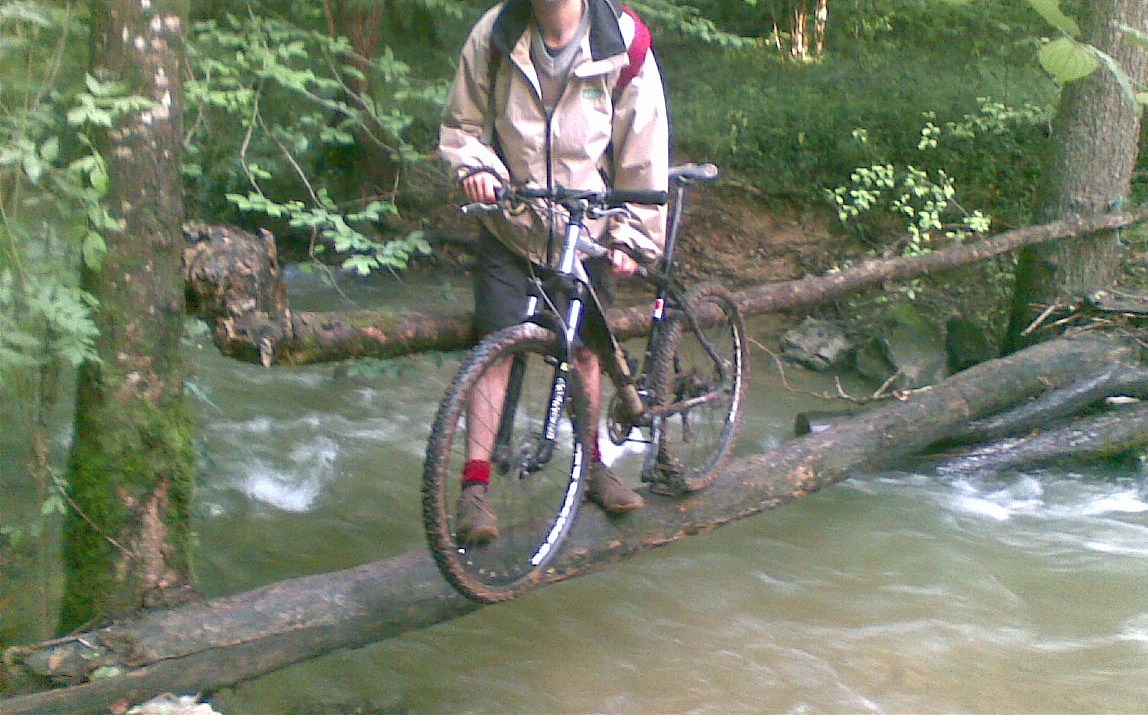
- Simple log bridge over the Alzou in France
- Span range: Short
- Material: Logs, dry set stonework footings, top may be flattened or boards added, topped with rammed earth for vehicles
- Movable: No
- Design effort: Low
- Falsework required: No

A log bridge is a timber bridge that uses logs that fall naturally or are intentionally felled or placed across streams. The first man-made bridges with significant span were probably intentionally felled trees.

The use of emplaced logs is now sometimes used in temporary bridges used for logging roads, where a forest tract is to be harvested and the road then abandoned. Such log bridges have a severely limited lifetime due to soil contact and subsequent rot and wood-eating insect infestation.

Longer-lasting log bridges may be constructed by using treated logs and/or by providing well drained footings of stone or concrete combined with regular maintenance to prevent soil infiltration. This care in construction can be seen in the French bridge illustrated below, which has well-locked dry set stone abutments and a footpath leveled with boards.

== Various log bridge designs ==
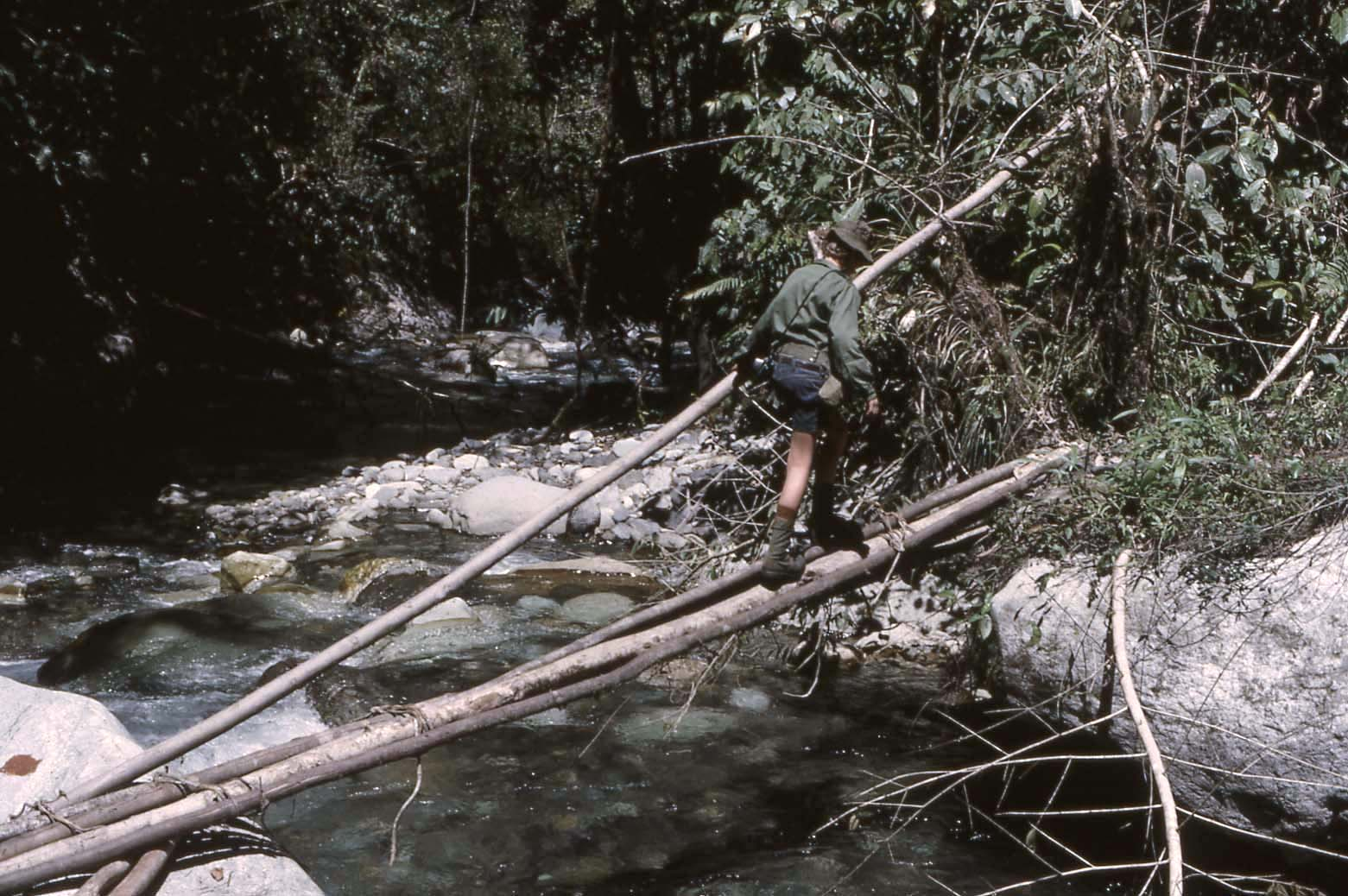
Log bridge over a river in Papua New Guinea

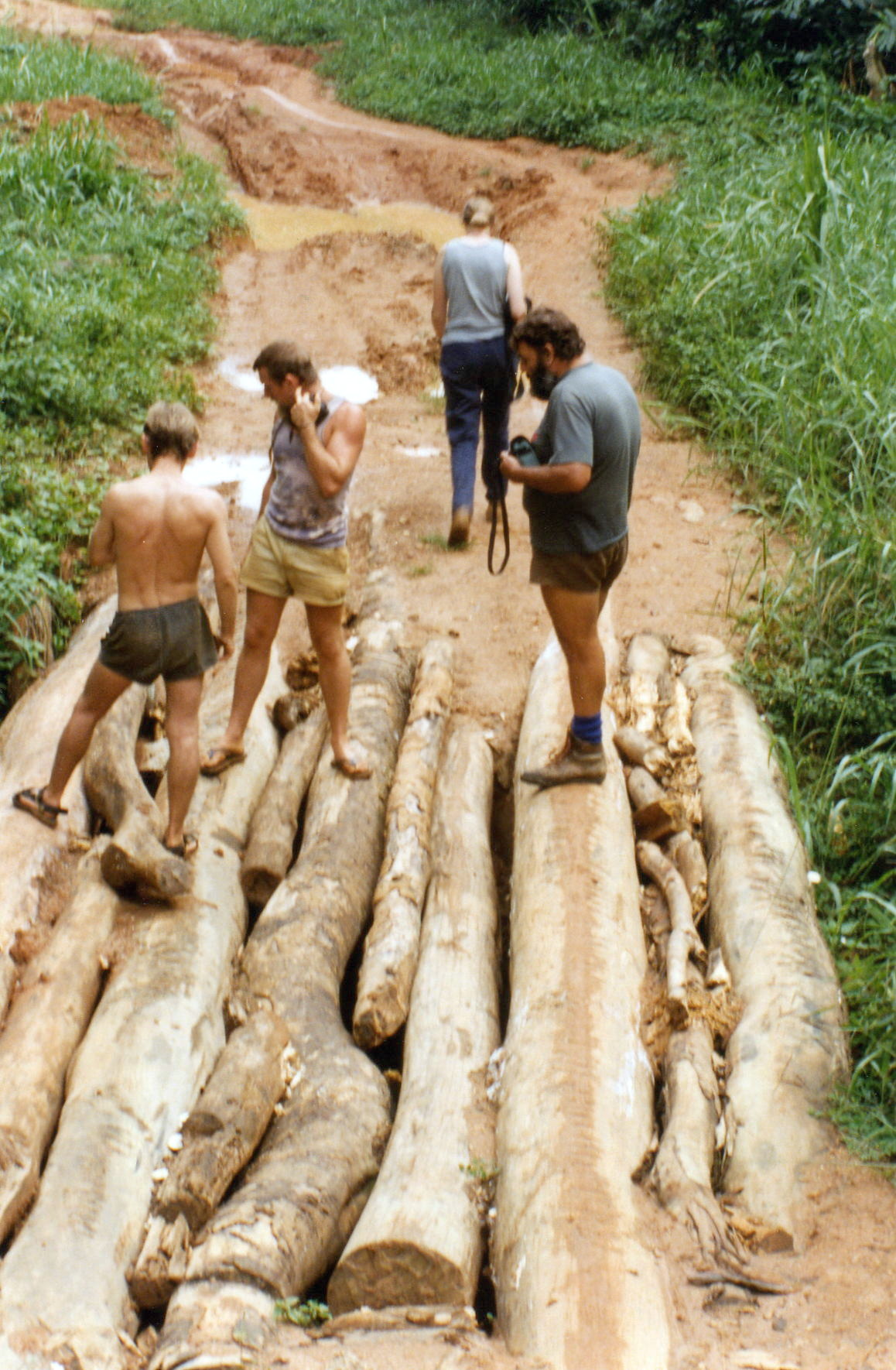
Log bridge in Zaire, made of multiple parallel logs

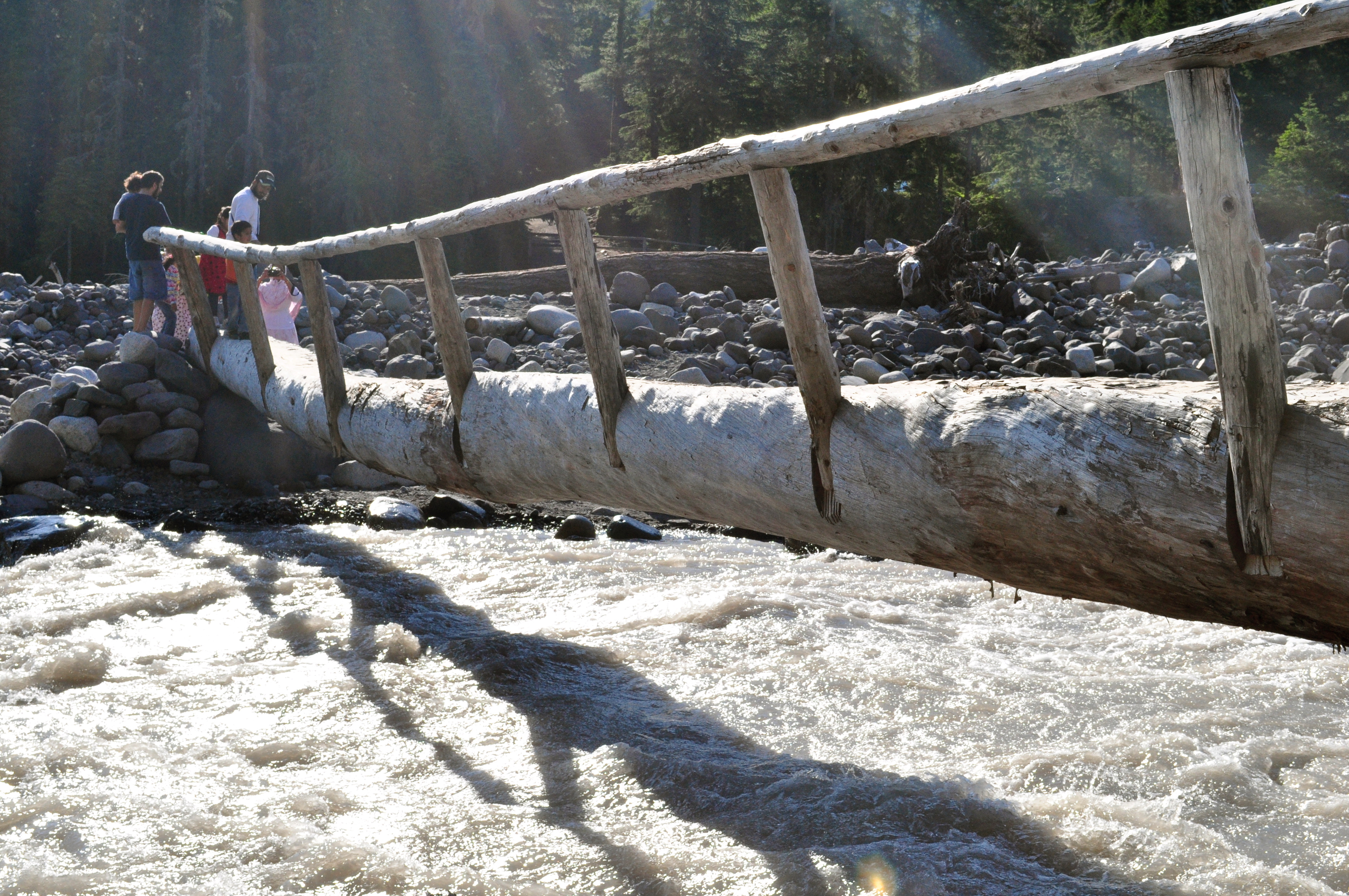
Log bridge over the Nisqually River, United States, made of one large log with handrail

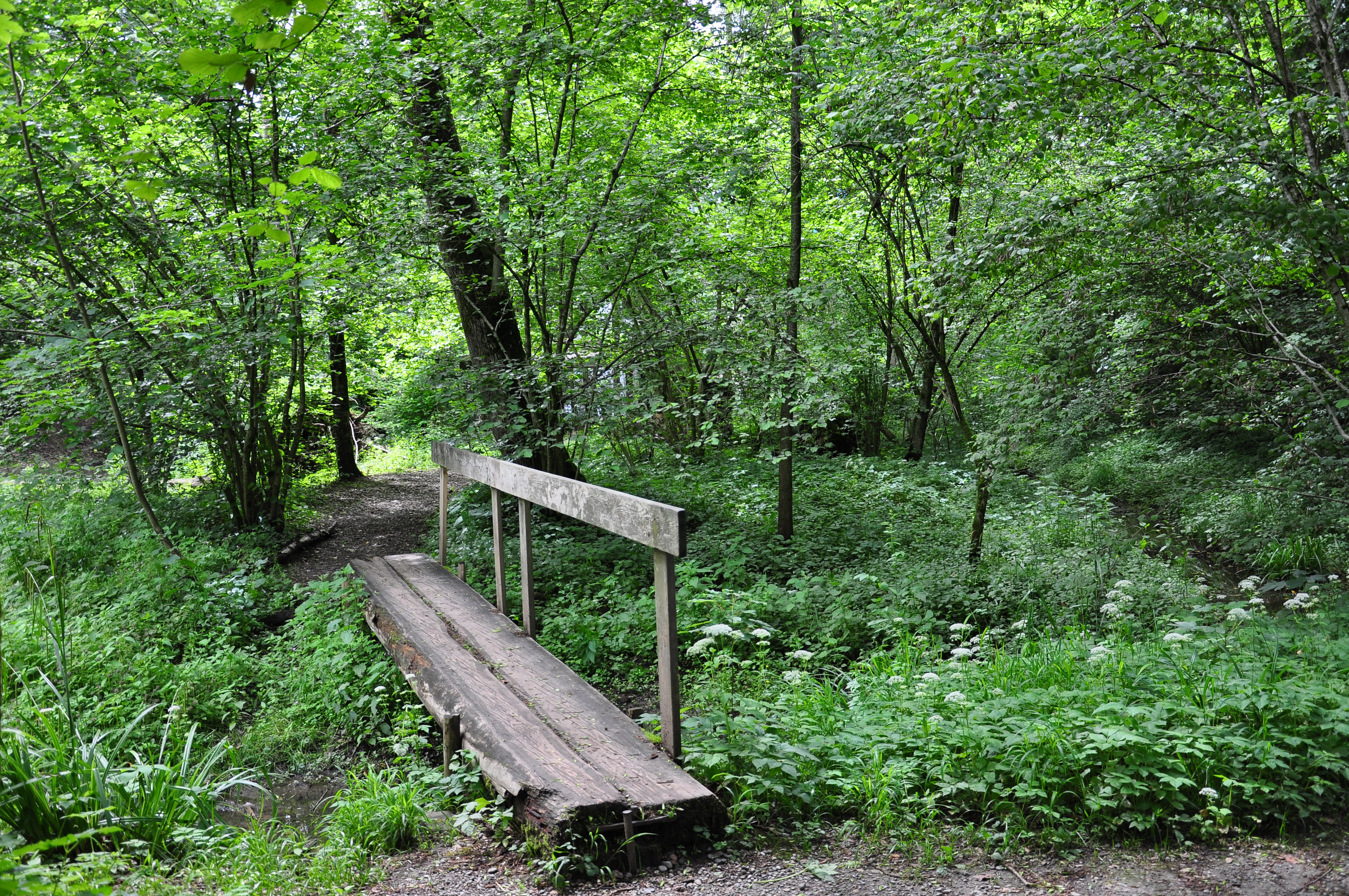
Log bridge in Switzerland with flattened top and handrail

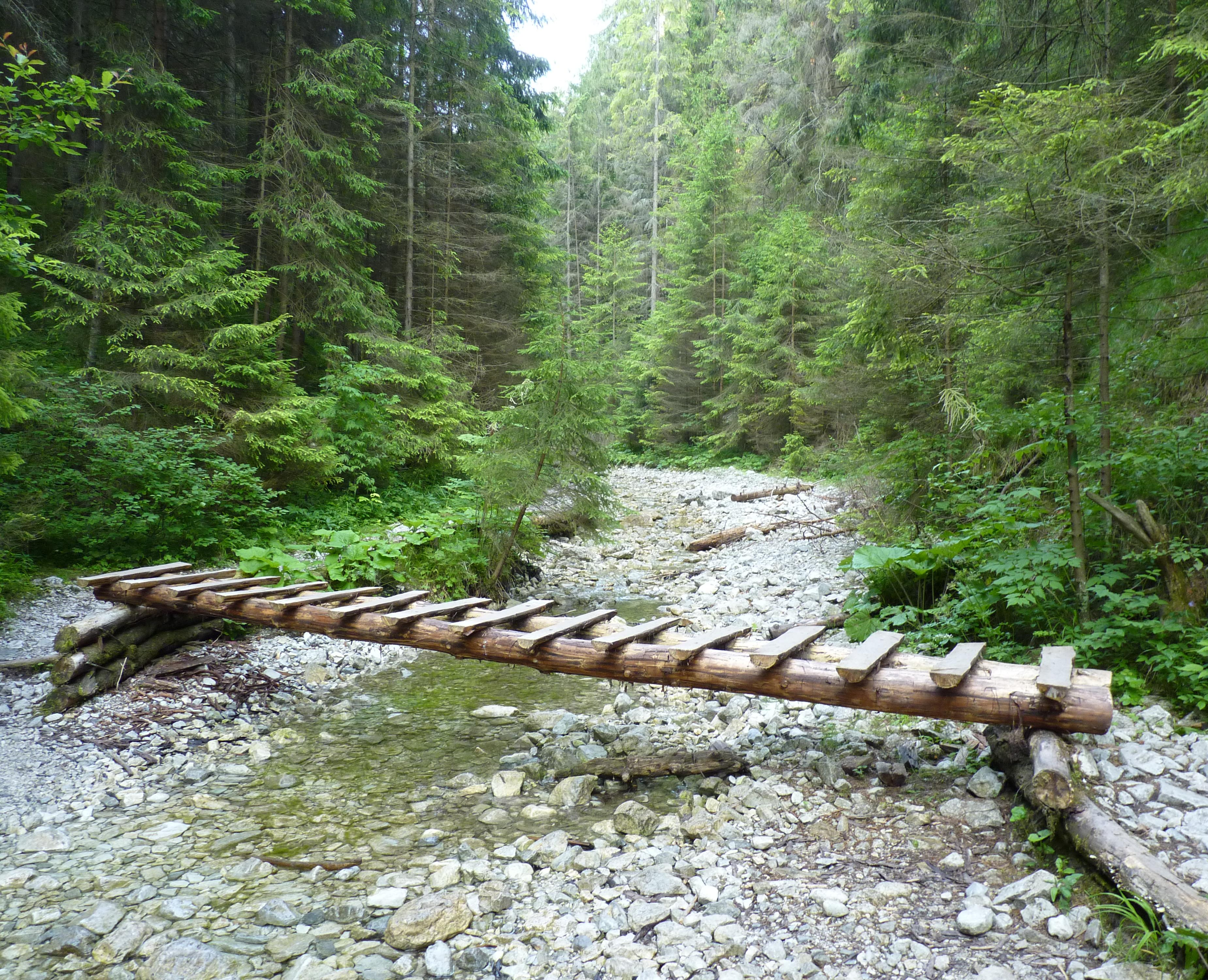
Log bridge in Slovakia with additional boards on top

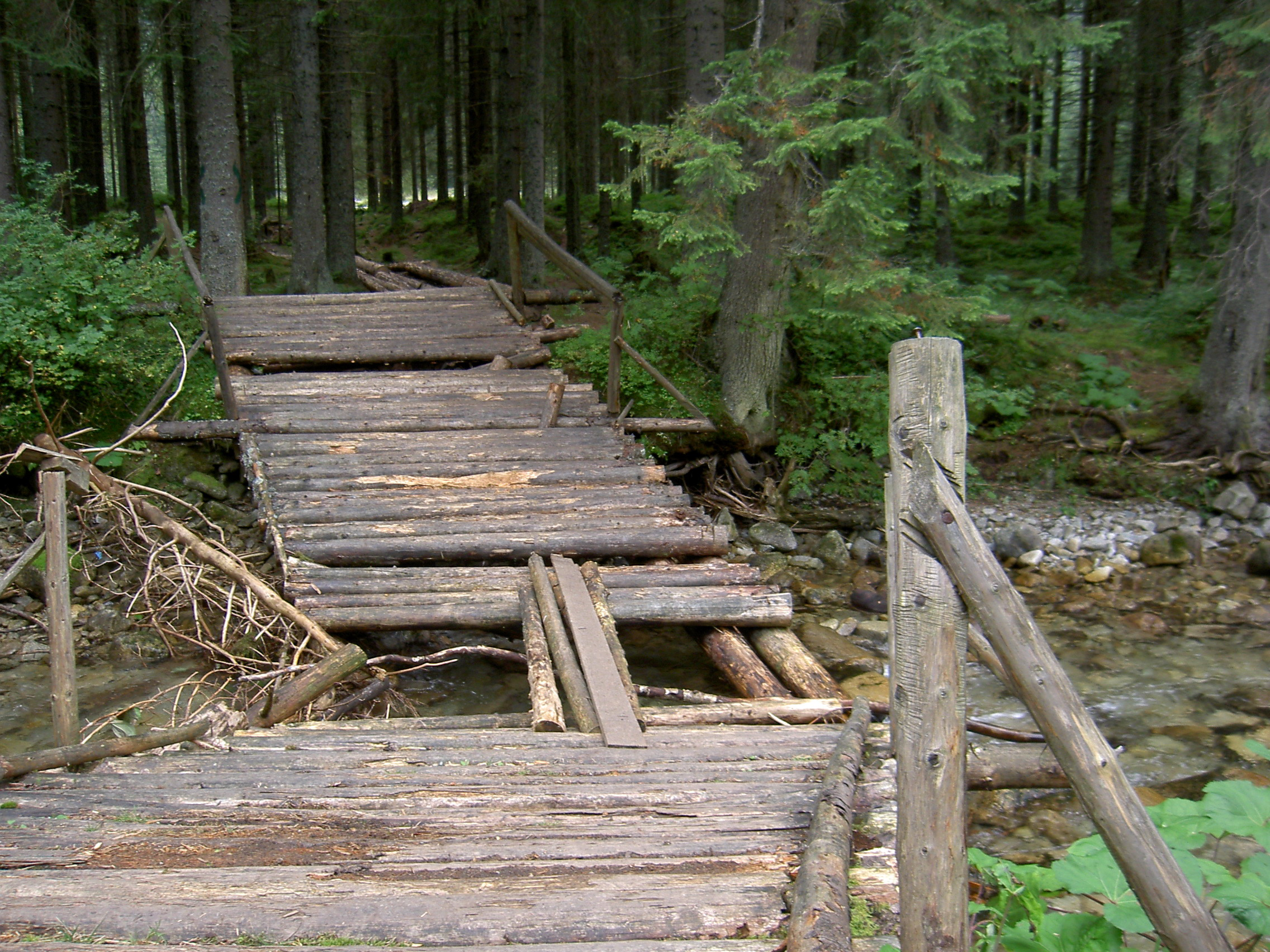
Log bridge in Slovakia with additional logs laid crosswise (a beam bridge)

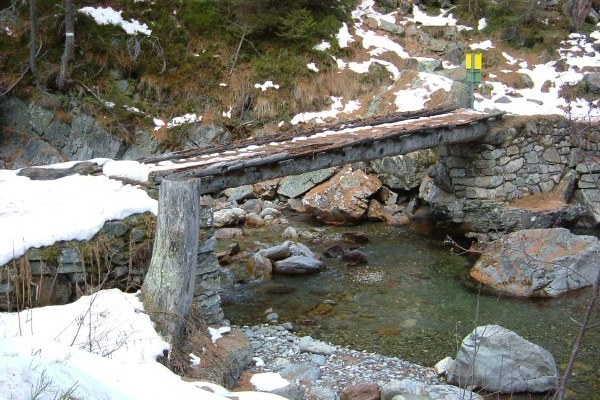
Log bridge in France with dry set stone abutments and a footpath leveled with boards

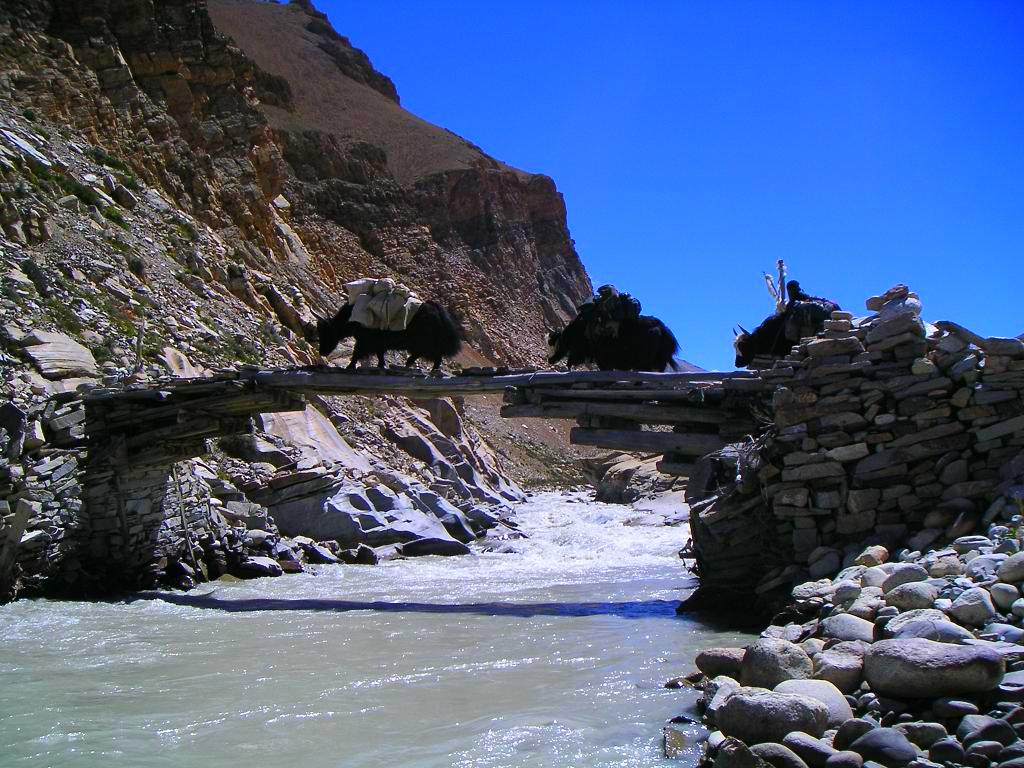
Complex Tibetan log bridge made of multiple logs (a cantilever bridge)
