= Galerie Barbazanges =

- Location in Paris
- Location: 109, Faubourg Saint-Honoré, Paris
- Coordinates: 48.872401°N 2.311042°E
- Type: Modern art gallery
- Founder: Henri Barbazanges

The Galerie Barbazanges was an art gallery in Paris that exhibited contemporary art between 1911 and 1928. The building was owned by a wealthy fashion designer, Paul Poiret, and the gallery was used for Poiret's "Salon d'Antin" exhibitions. The gallery showed the work of avant-garde artists such as Picasso, Modigliani, Gauguin, Matisse, Chagall, and Dufy.

== History ==
In 1911 Henri Barbazanges rented part of the property at 109 Rue du Faubourg Saint Honoré from his friend, the fashion designer Paul Poiret, and opened the Gallery Barbazanges with financial assistance from L. C. Hodebert. The gallery would exhibit contemporary art. The building was beside Poiret's eighteenth century mansion at 26 Avenue d'Antin. The Galerie Barbazanges leased the ground floor, with a total area of about 250 square metres (2,700 sq ft). Behind the front room there were a number of smaller rooms leading to a 70 square metres (750 sq ft) room without windows, but with a glass roof 5.5 metres (18 ft) high. This large back room may have been built by Barbazanges when he took control in 1911. A door was made between Poiret's mansion and one of the rooms of the gallery.

Poiret reserved the right to hold two exhibitions each year. One of these was L'Art Moderne en France from 16–31 July 1916, organized by André Salmon. Salmon gave "26 Avenue d'Antin" as the address and called the exhibition the "Salon d'Antin". Artists included Pablo Picasso, who showed Les Demoiselles d'Avignon for the first time, Amedeo Modigliani, Moïse Kisling, Manuel Ortíz de Zárate, and Marie Vassilieff. Poiret also arranged concerts of new music at the gallery, often in combination with exhibitions of new art. The 1916 Salon d'Antin included readings of poetry by Max Jacob and Guillaume Apollinaire, and performances of work by Erik Satie, Darius Milhaud, Igor Stravinsky, and Georges Auric. Satie's Musique d'ameublement (furniture music) was performed in public for the first time at the gallery on 8 March 1920 during intermissions of a play by Max Jacob. (Note: Satie's simple and repetitive musique d'ameublement was meant as an unobtrusive background, an early version of the elevator music that is played in elevators, shopping malls and hotel lobbies. The audience listened to it quietly and attentively, however, as they would any other musical performance. Satie jumped out and pleaded with them to ignore the music, talk, make noise or look at the pictures.)

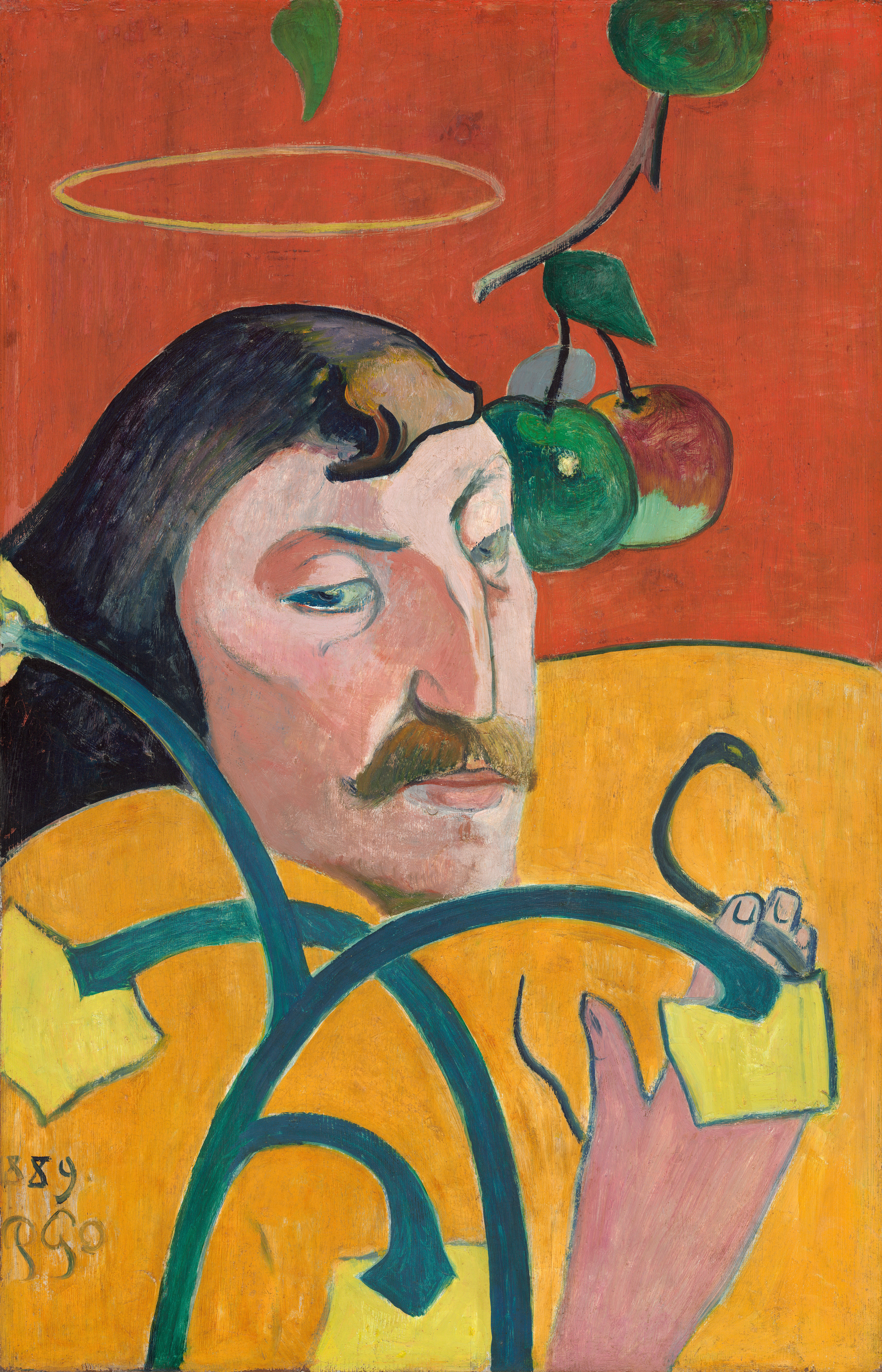
Paul Gauguin – Self-Portrait with Halo and Snake

In 1919 the gallery purchased Paul Gauguin's Self-Portrait with Halo and Snake from François Norgelet. The painting was later acquired by Lord Ivor Charles Spencer Churchill.

In 1923 Pierre Matisse, son of Henri Matisse and Amélie Parayre, came to work at the gallery to gain experience in the art market before moving to New York in 1924. In March 1923 Raoul Dufy and Jean Émile Laboureur organized the first Exposition du Groupe des peintres-graveurs indépendants at the gallery. A second exhibition of this group was held in 1924. Another of Poiret's exhibitions, also organized by Salmon, was La Collection particulière de M. Paul Poiret, from 26 April to 12 May 1923.

Barbazanges retired in 1923, but Hodebert continued to run the gallery under the original name. Advertisements in 1926 also called it the Galerie Barbazanges-Hodebert. In the spring of 1928 the gallery moved to 174 Rue du Faubourg St. Honoré, the Galerie Camille Hodebert had been open since 1922. In 1929 this gallery was called the Galerie L.C. Hodebert. In January 1929 Hodebart transferred the space of the former Galerie Barbazanges to Georges Bernheim. It housed the Galerie Heim from the 1950s, which specialized in old master paintings.

== Exhibitions ==
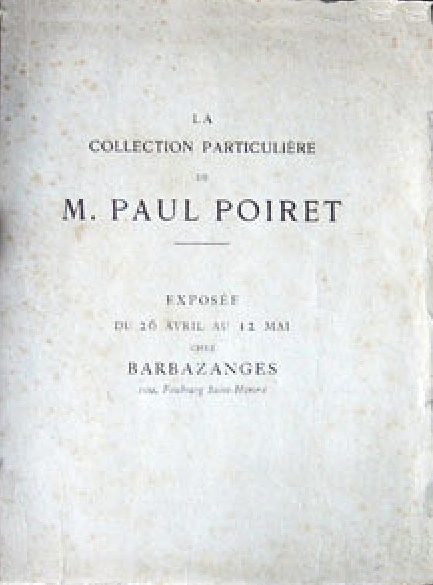
Program for the 1923 exhibition of the Art collection of Paul Poiret

Exhibitions at the gallery included:

- 1911: 7 April – 2 May. Exposition de céramiques persanes de miniatures et manuscrits organized by The Persian Art Gallery of London.
- 1912: 28 February – 13 March. First major exhibition of Robert Delaunay, with 46 works from his early impressionist days to his most recent Paris cityscapes and cubist depictions of the Eiffel Tower. The work of Marie Laurencin was also shown in this exhibition.
- 1916: 16–31 July. L'Art Moderne en France – Salon d'Antin organized by André Salmon.
- 1917: Les Peintres de la guerre au camouflage – Fauves group.
- 1919: June–July. Works by Mikhail Larionov and Natalia Goncharova
- 1919: 10–30 October. Paul Gauguin Exposition d'oeuvres inconnues
- 1919: 1–15 December. Exposition Abel Truchet. Program preface by Frantz Jourdain.
- 1919: 19 December – 10 January 1920. Les maitres anglais, 1740–1840 : exposition de pastels, aquarelles et dessins
- 1920: 17 June – 4 July. Second exhibition of La Jeune Peinture française, an Amedeo Modigliani retrospective
- 1921: Exposition des eaux-fortes, bois gravés, lithographies et dessins de Bernard Naudin.
- 1921: 15–31 January. 3e Exposition de la Société des Artistes Animaliers, peintres, sculpteurs, graveurs : rétrospective, oeuvres d'Auguste Lançon.
- 1922: 28 January – 25 February. Exposition d'art irlandais.
- 1922: 17–31 March. Auguste Brouet. Son oeuvre. First exhibition in France.
- 1922: 3–19 April. Sculpture en taille directe et tapisserie : first exhibition organized by the review La douce France. Program preface by Emmanuel de Thubert.
- 1922: 17–31 November. Le Sport dans l'art : Art ancien et moderne, peinture, sculpture, gravure, architecture etc. With Henri Matisse, André Dunoyer de Segonzac, Raoul Dufy and Maurice de Vlaminck
- 1922: 1–16 December. Exposition Michel Simonidy.
- 1923: 15–28 February. Exhibition of work by Conrad Kickert. This was the artist's first solo exhibition in France, and received positive reviews. Before the end of the show it was announced that the state had purchased Le Pot chinois for the Musée du Luxembourg.
- 1923: 17–31 March. 1e Exposition du groupe des peintres-graveurs indépendants.
- 1923: 4–25 April. Third exhibition of La Jeune Peinture française
- 1923: 26 April – 12 May. Art collection of Paul Poiret. Much of this would be auctioned in November 1925 at the Hôtel Drouot due to Poiret's bankruptcy.
- 1923: 17–31 May. Sculpture en taille directe, tapisserie fresque : second exhibition organized by the review La douce France. Program preface by Emmanuel de Thubert.
- 1924: 2–15 January. Early works of Maurice Utrillo from the period 1910–14.
- 1924: Fourth exhibition of La Jeune Peinture française
- 1924: 17–30 December. Work by Marc Chagall.
- 1925: 6–21 February. Sculptures and watercolors by Ossip Zadkine
- 1925: 3–17 March. Paintings and drawings by André Léveillé.
- 1925: 2 – 23 May 1925. Le Maroc : peintures et bas-reliefs de Bernard Boutet de Monvel. Program preface by Jérôme Tharaud and Jean Tharaud.
- 1925: 16–29 November. Paintings by Othon Coubine.
- 1925: Fifth exhibition of La Jeune Peinture française.
- 1925: Exhibition of tapestries by Raoul Dufy
- 1925 3–19 December. Exposition d'un Groupe de Fémmes Peintrés Françaises, including work by Marie-Alix, Fernande Barrey, Chériane, Marguerite Crissay, Hermine David, Suzanne Duchamp, Geneviève Gallibert, Marguerite Lemaire Ghy-Lemm, Irène Lagut, Marie Laurencin, Marguerite Matisse, daughter of Henri Matisse), Hélène Perdriat, Valentine Prax and Jeanne Rij-Rousseau
- 1926: April. Works by Francis Picabia.
- 1926: November–December. Retrospective of Roger de La Fresnaye.
- 1926: Works by José Fioravanti.
- 1926: 18 – 30 May. "Exposition des Oeuvres de Roberto Ramaugé".
- 1928: 6 – 21 January. Peintres normands : 3e exposition. De Nicolas Poussin à nos jours.
- 1928: 23 March – 14 April. Solo exhibition of Amédée Ozenfant

== Publications ==
Publications included:

- Galeries Henry Barbazanges (1911), Catalogue d'exposition d'art musulman de [sic] 3 novembre au 3 décembre 1911 (in French), Paris: Galeries Henry Barbazanges, p. 55
- Galeries Henry Barbazanges (1911), Exposition des peintres hollandais modernes Galerie Barbazanges (in French), Paris: Galeries Henry Barbazanges, p. 11
- Galeries Henry Barbazanges (1912), Les Peintres R. Delaunay, Marie Laurencin : exposition du... 28 février au... 13 mars 1912 (in French), Fernand Fleuret, Preface, Paris: Galeries Henry Barbazanges
- Les Maîtres anglais 1740–1840 (in French), Charles Oulmont, commentary, Paris: Galeries Henry Barbazanges, 1919, p. 23
- Galeries Henry Barbazanges (1922), Le sport dans l'art : art ancien et moderne, peinture, sculpture, gravure, architecture (in French), Jean Richepin, preface; Louis Vauxcelles, preface; Georges Bourdon, postface, Paris: Lettres-arts-sports, p. 31
- Gustave Geffroy (1922), Auguste Brouet : son oeuvre (in French), Paris: Galeries Henry Barbazanges; Impr. de Frazier-Soye, p. 14

== Sources ==
- Clement, Russell T. (1994), Les Fauves: A Sourcebook, Greenwood Publishing Group, ISBN 978-0-313-28333-8
- Cottington, David (2004), Cubism and Its Histories, Manchester University Press, ISBN 978-0-7190-5004-6
- Davis, Mary E. (2007-06-15), Erik Satie, Reaktion Books, ISBN 978-1-86189-602-5
- "Galerie barbazanges", bibliothèque des Arts Décoratifs
- "Gallery Barbazanges", kubisme.info (in Dutch)
- "Galerie Barbazanges. Paris", BnF (in French)
- "Galerie Barbazanges", Transatlantic Encounters
- Gard, Lucien; Gard, Anne, Talent reconnu > A la Galerie Barbazange (in French), Association Conrad Kickert
- Hughes, Gordon (2014-11-25), Resisting Abstraction: Robert Delaunay and Vision in the Face of Modernism, University of Chicago Press, ISBN 978-0-226-15906-5
- Klüver, Billy; Cocteau, Jean (1999), A Day with Picasso, MIT Press, ISBN 978-0-262-61147-3
- Lanza, Joseph (2004-01-26), Elevator Music: A Surreal History of Muzak, Easy-Listening, and Other Moodsong; Revised and Expanded Edition, University of Michigan Press, ISBN 0-472-08942-0
- Oeuvres de Marc Chagall de 1908 à 1924 : galerie Barbazanges, Paris, du 17 au 30 décembre 1924 (in French)
- Paul Gauguin : Exposition d'oeuvres inconnues, galerie Barbazanges, Paris, du 10 au 30 octobre 1919 (in French), OCLC 25839448
- Self-Portrait, 1889, Provancance, National Gallery of Art, Washington, DC, archived from the original on 2015-12-30
- "Tentoonstellingen, Galerie Barbazanges", kubisme.info (in Dutch)
