= Salon des Tuileries =

Art exhibition in Paris

The Salon des Tuileries was an annual art exhibition for painting and sculpture, created June 14, 1923, co-founded by painters Albert Besnard and Bessie Davidson, sculptor Antoine Bourdelle, architect Auguste Perret, and others.

The first year's exhibition was conducted in former barracks at the Porte Maillot of the city gates of Paris, near the Bois de Boulogne in a "Palais du Bois" hastily constructed by the Perret brothers. Its location varied afterwards. The Salon, together with the 1884 Société des Artistes Indépendants, the 1903 Salon d'Automne and others, was organized in opposition to the Academy's official Salon system. Annual exhibitions continued at least into the 1950s.

== Participating artists ==
Participating artists included:

- Edith Auerbach
- Edmond Aman-Jean
- Marcelle Bergerol
- Jules Cavaillès
- Margaret Cossaceanu
- Marguerite Crissay
- Mildred Crooks
- Joseph Csaky
- Alice Dannenberg
- Charles Despiau
- Louis Dewis
- Jean Dries
- Raoul Dufy
- Fan Tchunpi
- Roger de La Fresnaye
- Frederick Carl Frieseke
- Othon Friesz
- Alberto Giacometti
- Albert Gleizes
- Natalia Goncharova
- Adolph Gottlieb
- Louise Janin
- Tamara de Lempicka
- Moïse Kisling
- Sonia Lewitska
- Jean Metzinger
- Henri Ottmann
- Marie-Thérèse Pinto
- Olga Sacharoff
- Amrita Sher-Gil
- Nat Smolin
- Martha Stettler
- Léopold Survage
- Henriette Tirman
- Maurice de Vlaminck
- Ossip Zadkine
