= Ouysse =

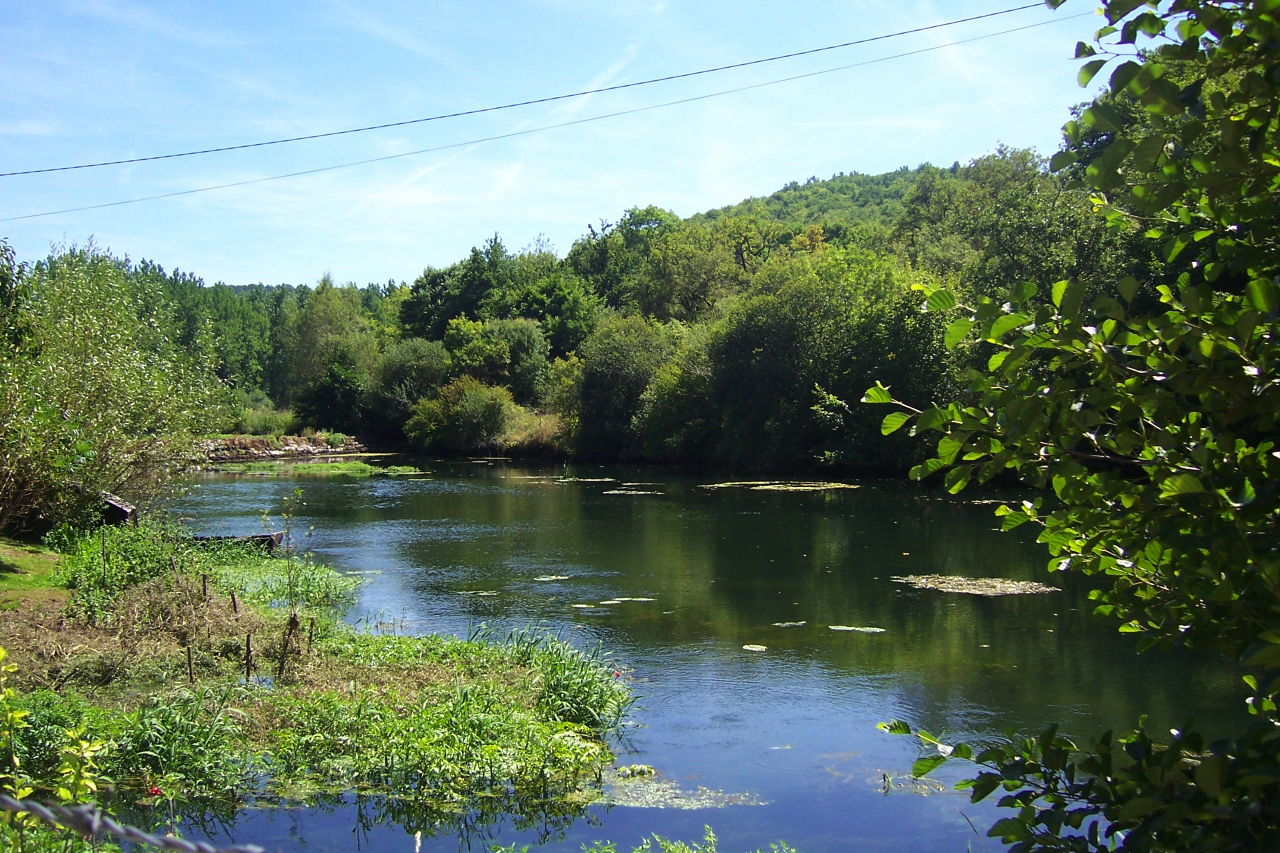

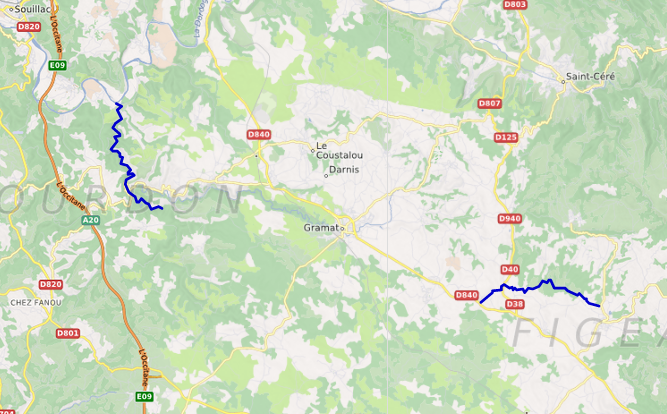

Location
- Country: France

Physical characteristics
- Source
  - location: Lacapelle-Marival
  - coordinates: 44.7371°N 1.9184°E
- Mouth
  - location: Dordogne
  - coordinates: 44.8467°N 1.553°E
- Length: 41 km (25 mi)
- Basin size: 412 km^{2} (159 sq mi)

Basin features
- Progression: Dordogne→ Gironde estuary→ Atlantic Ocean

The Ouysse (French pronunciation: [wis]) is an approximately 41 km (25 mi) long river in the Lot (department) department, south-central France. Its source is near the small town Lacapelle-Marival. It flows west to the village Thémines, from where it continues as a subterranean river through the limestone formations south of Gramat. It emerges near Rocamadour, about 20 km west from where it submerged, receives its tributary the Alzou and flows into the Dordogne near Lacave.

== Etymology ==
The name "Ouysse" has its roots in the Gascon root "ousse", referring to a body of water, such as a spring, fountain, stream, river, or a lake.
