= Marcelle Bergerol =

French painter

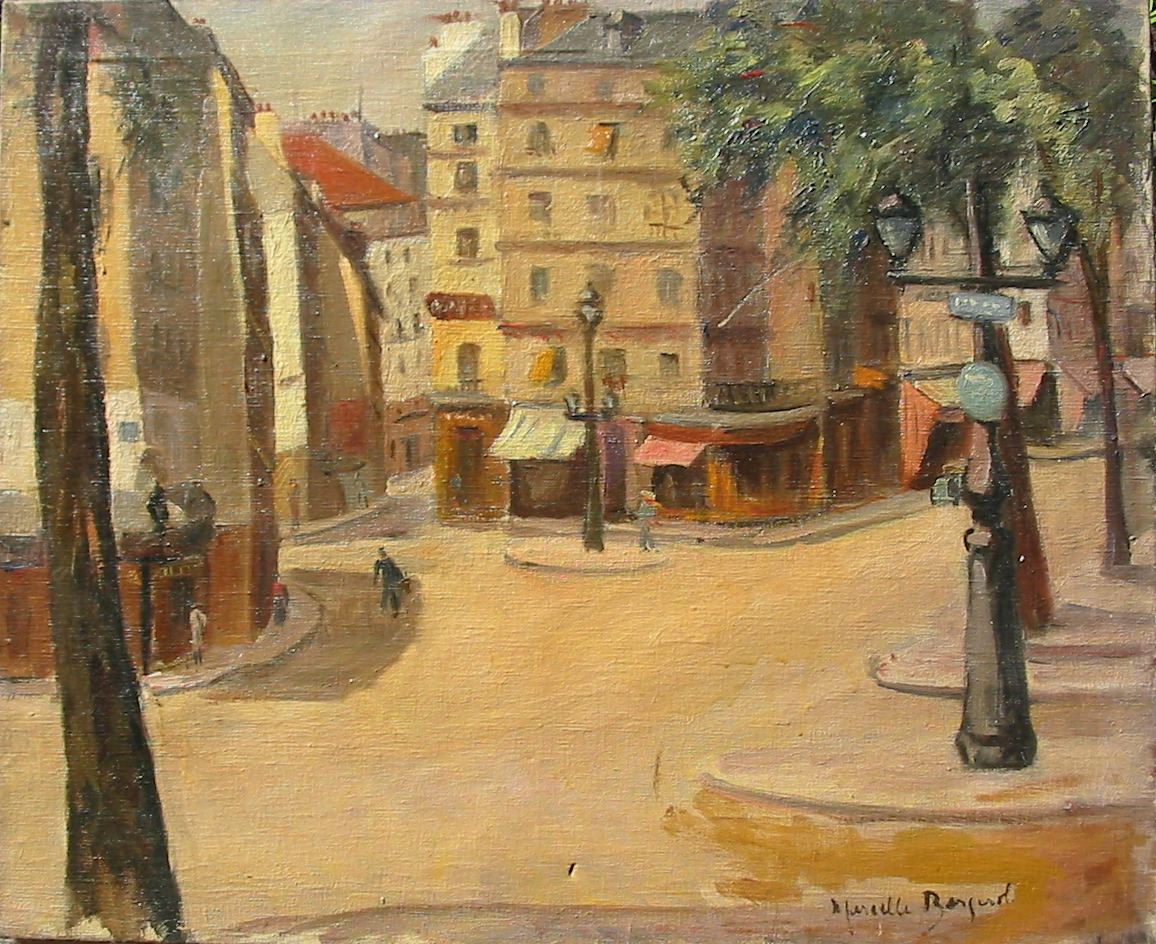
Quartier Latin, Paris - Oil on canvas

Marcelle Bergerol (née Cahen) (1901 Paris - 1989 Boulogne-Billancourt) was a post-impressionist French painter, specializing in paintings of France and Paris, Brittany, and the Quercy region of France.

Bergerol took drawing classes before she joined the atelier of Edmond Heuzé in the early 1920. She exhibited in Paris at the Salon des Indépendants starting in 1927 and later showed her work at the Salon d'Automne from 1929 to 1936, and the Salon des Tuileries from 1930 to 1934. She also exhibited in several galleries in Paris, such as the Gallery du Verseau, the Gallery Altarriba and the Gallery Armand Drouant, before and after World War II.

Color and forms are two distinctive elements in Bergerol's work. Her art was influenced by Cézanne, Monet, and Pissarro. As a post-impressionist painter, however, she was especially influenced by the use of colors in fauvist painter Albert Marquet's work.
