= Timber bridge =

Bridge that uses timber or wood as its principal structural material

Beam bridge
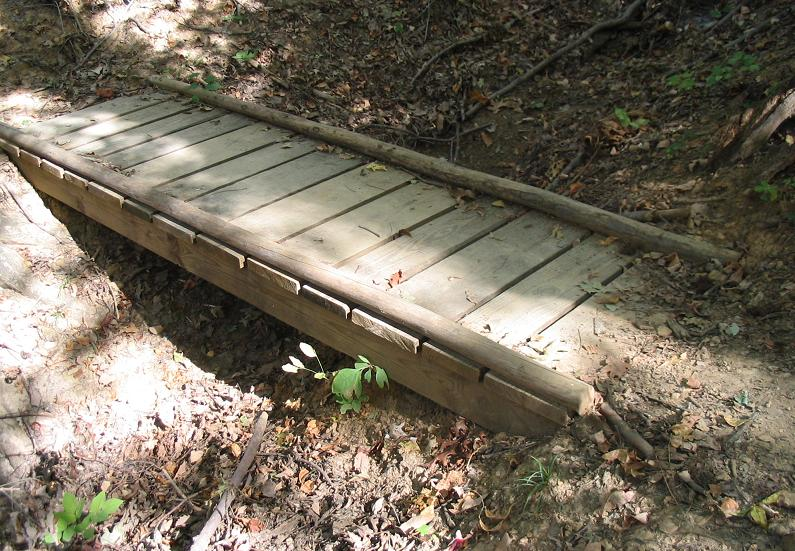
- The Beam bridge

Characteristics
- Material: Wood

Trestle
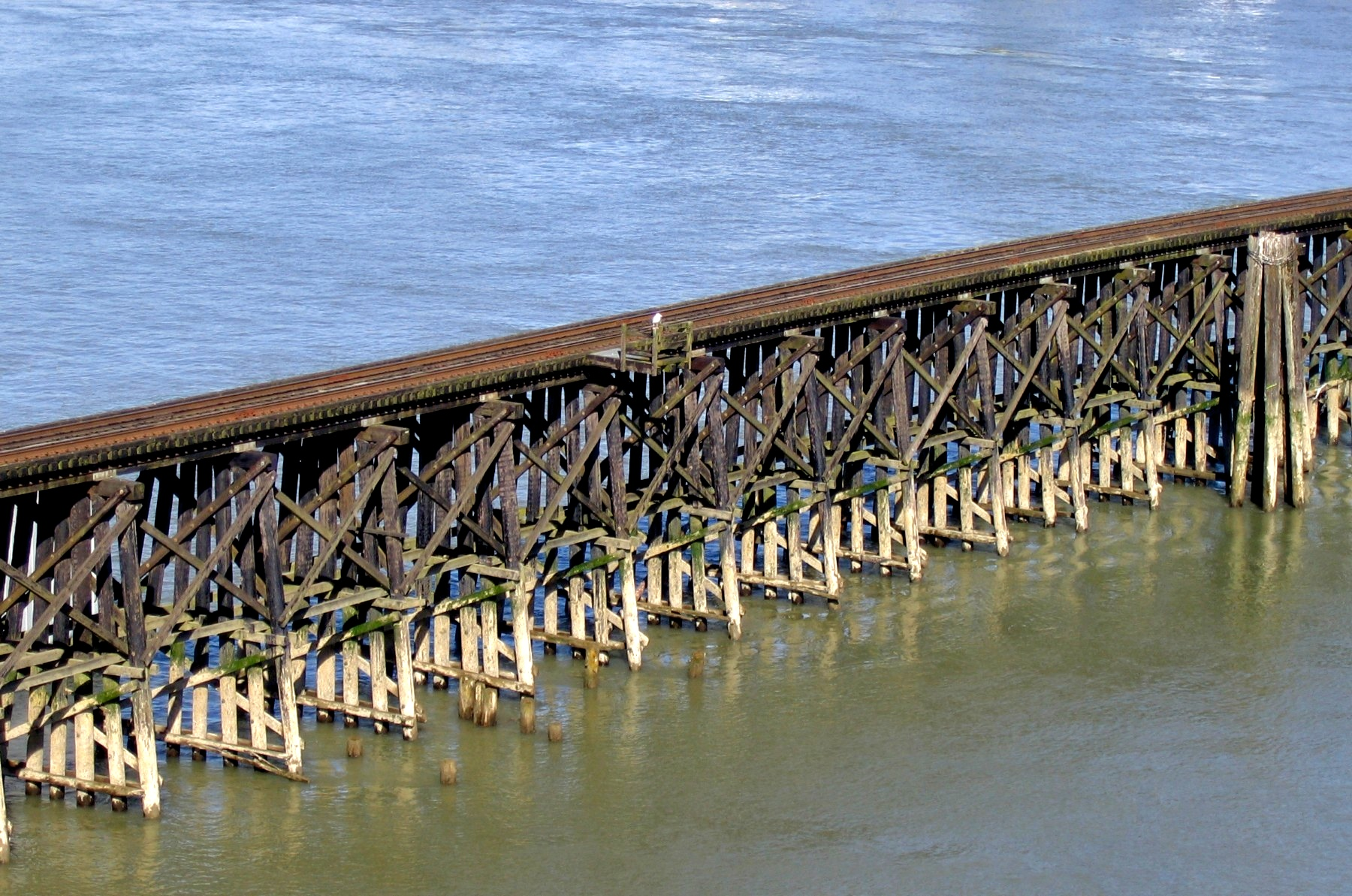
- Trestles are useful as approaches to bridges over marshes and shallows
- Material: Timber, iron, steel, reinforced concrete, prestressed concrete

A timber bridge or wooden bridge is a bridge that uses timber or wood as its principal structural material. One of the first forms of bridge, those of timber have been used since ancient times.

== History ==
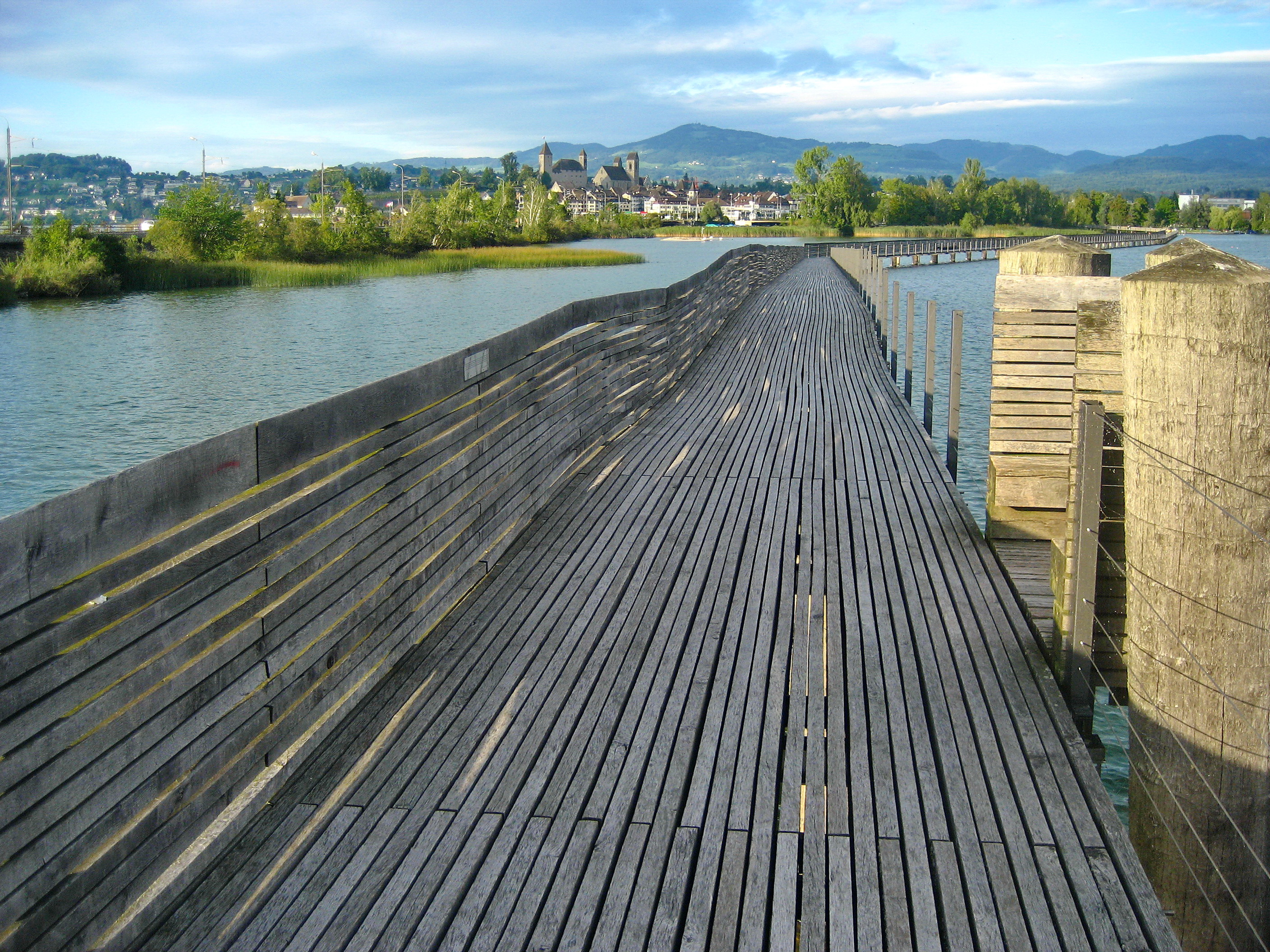
Holzbrücke Rapperswil-Hurden, a modern bridge on the route of one of the oldest known timber bridges.

The most ancient form of timber bridge is the log bridge, created by felling a tree over a gap needing to be crossed.

Among the oldest timber bridges is the Holzbrücke Rapperswil-Hurden crossing upper Lake Zürich in Switzerland; the prehistoric timber piles discovered to the west of the Seedamm date back to 1523 B.C. The first wooden footbridge led across Lake Zürich, followed by several reconstructions at least until the late 2nd century AD, when the Roman Empire built a 6-metre-wide (20 ft) wooden bridge. Between 1358 and 1360, Rudolf IV, Duke of Austria, built a 'new' wooden bridge across the lake that was used until 1878 – measuring approximately 1,450 metres (4,760 ft) in length and 4 metres (13 ft) wide. On April 6, 2001, the reconstructed wooden footbridge was opened, being the longest wooden bridge in Switzerland. The Kapellbrücke is a 204-metre-long (669 ft) bridge crossing the Reuss in the city of Lucerne in Switzerland. It is the oldest wooden covered bridge in Europe, and one of Switzerland's main tourist attractions.

== Environment ==
Recently timber bridges have received attention in the United States because they are environmentally friendly compared to other bridge types. Until 1991, the Federal Highway Administration has concentrated on major highways and other primary roads; rural highways and local roads, where timber bridges are mostly found, have received less attention.

Local and state agencies prefer timber bridges because timber is a renewable resource, it is relatively economical, and there have been rapid improvements in design, construction, and preservative treatment. The US Congress emphasized timber bridges by passing the Timber Bridge Initiative (TBI) in 1988 and the Intermodal Surface Transportation and Efficiency Act (ISTEA) in 1991.

Covered bridges, usually made of wood and enclosed as if a tunnel, were very popular in the 19th century in the US. Today, timber bridges are promoted as environmentally friendly, and as a way to protect water quality and the habitat along waterways. Timber bridges can be placed over small streams or channels with firm, stable banks.

The passing of TBI and ISTEA by the US Congress has provided an impetus to identify and develop standard designs for timber bridges, which the US Forest Service has done. The US Forest Service has designed standardized plans for timber bridge superstructures made of treated lumber.

=== Examples ===
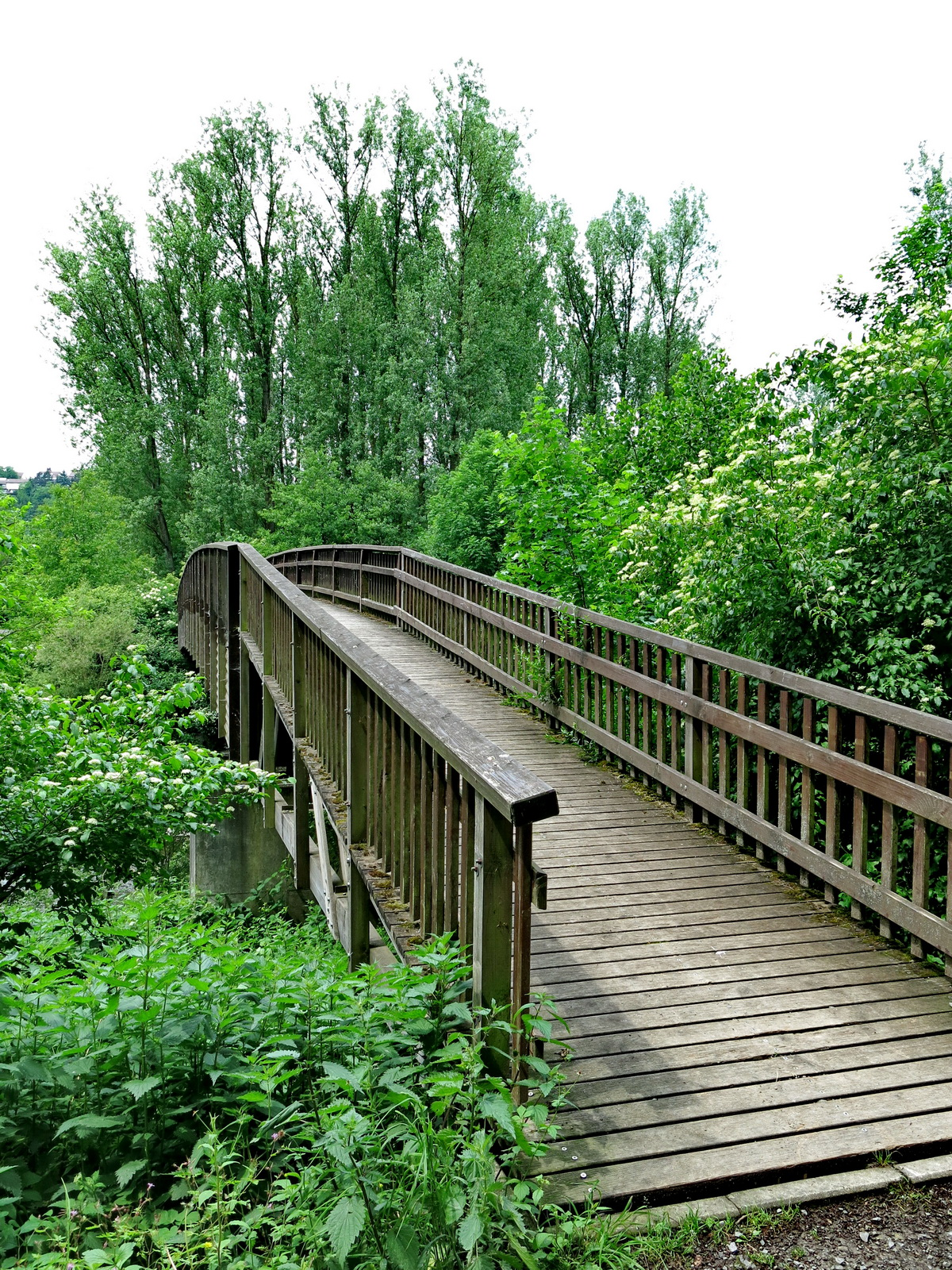
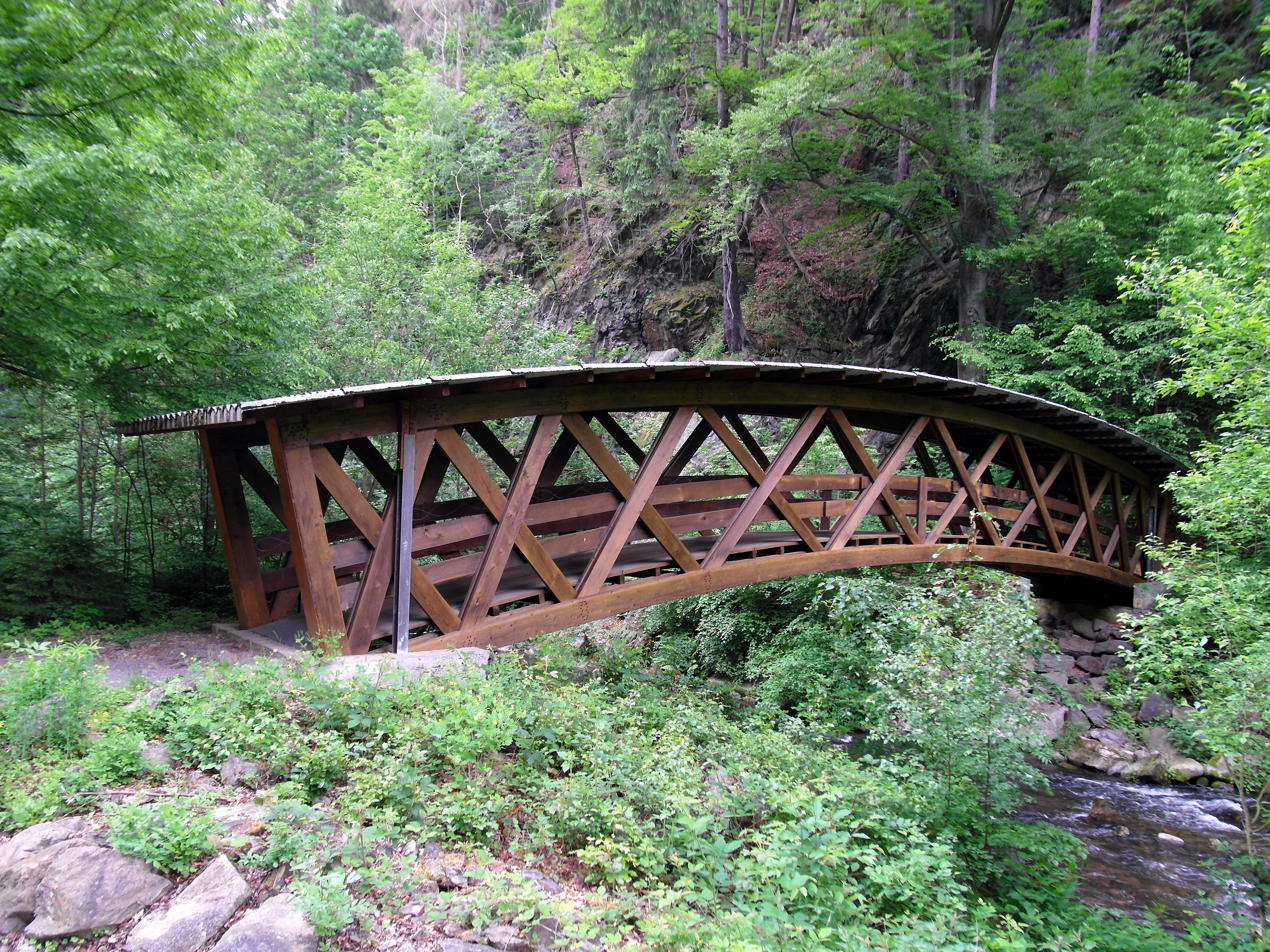
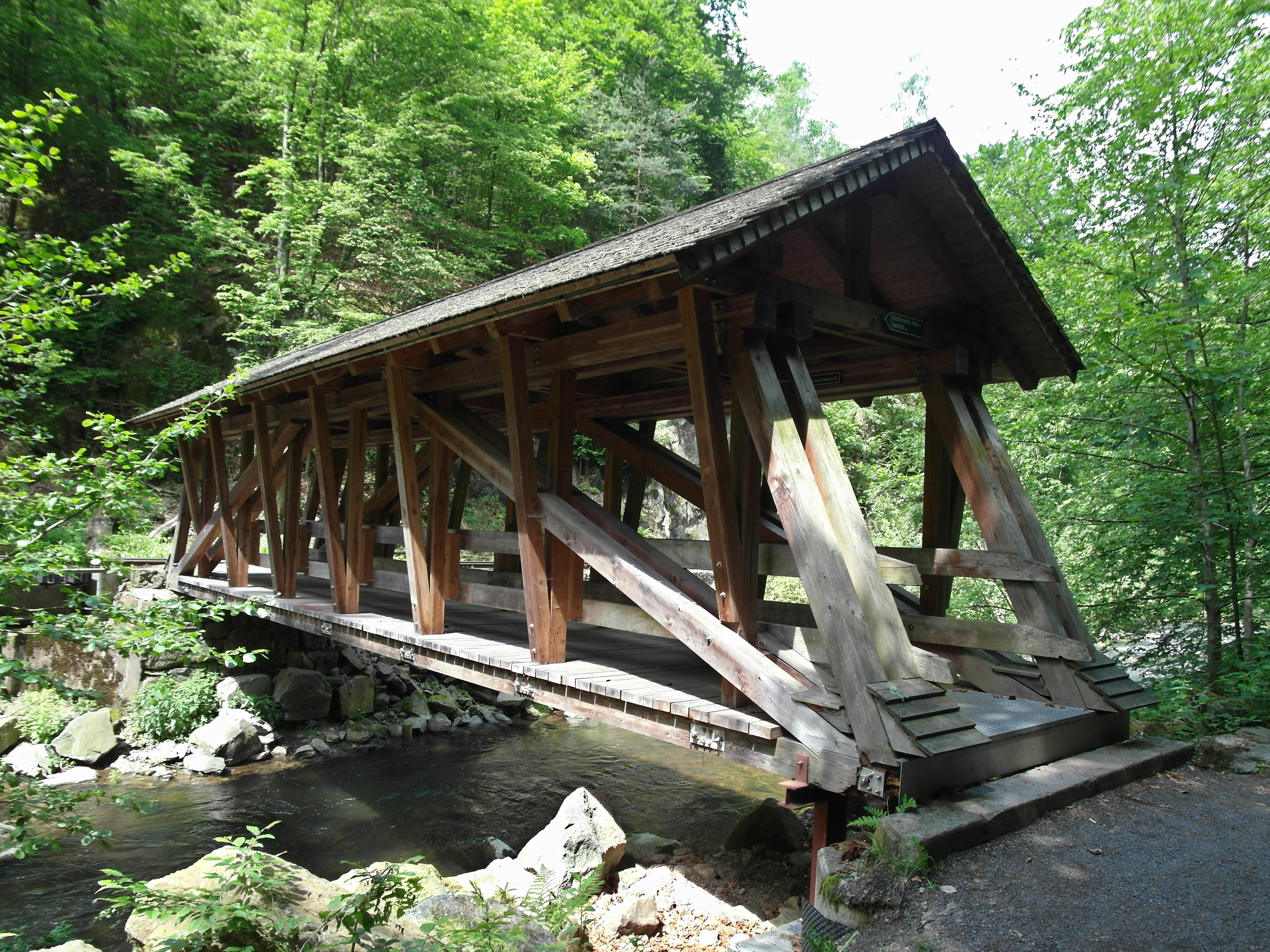
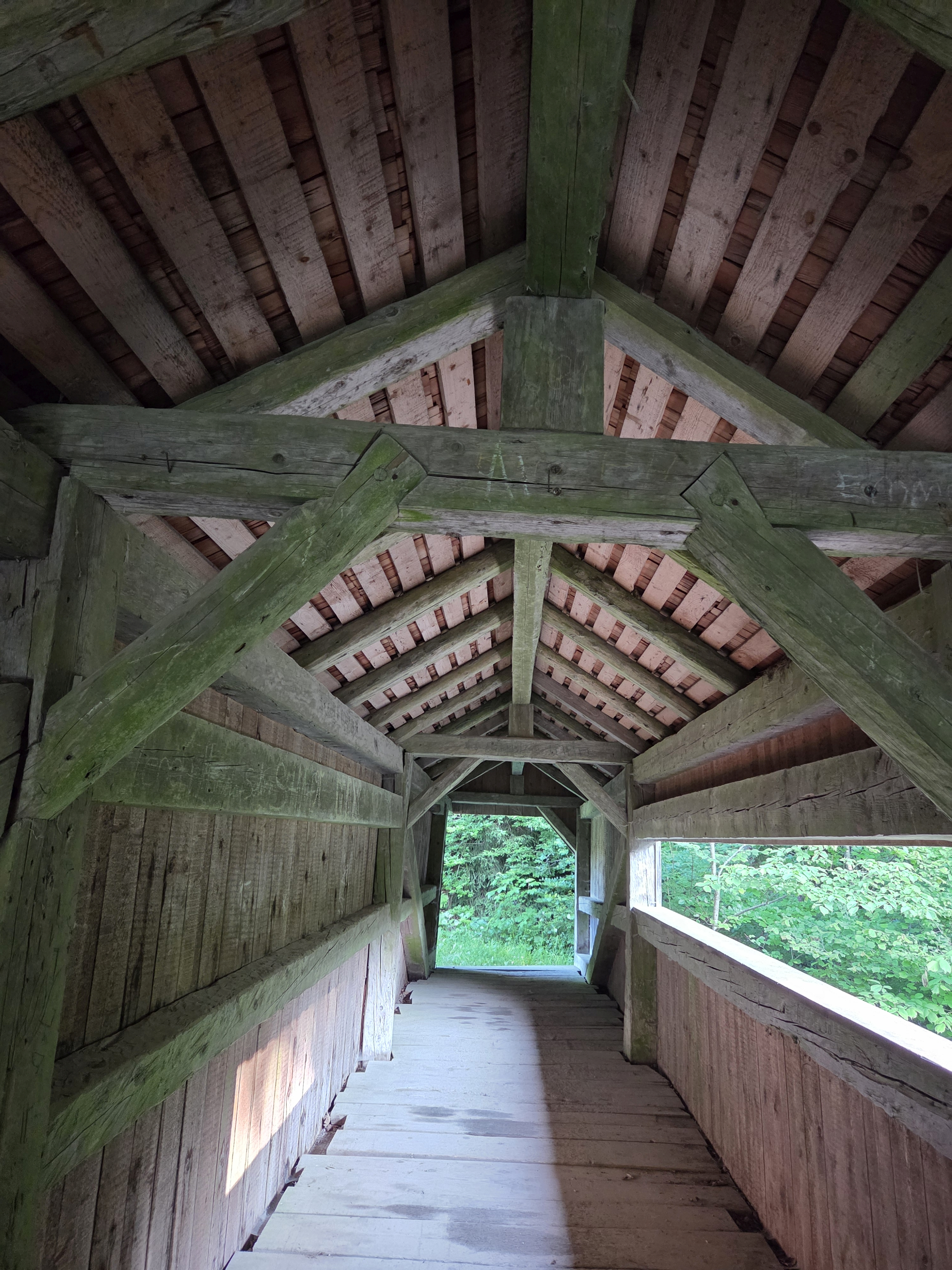
Examples of various types of wooden bridges

The University of Minnesota Extension Service recommends three types of timber bridges for wilderness lands, and suggest that a licensed engineer be hired to insure the bridge design is safe and appropriate for the site. Using fallen trees, stringer bridges can be built. Wood laminated by stress, glued, dowels, or nails lumber are good for panel bridges. New lumber and wood scavenged from buildings and railroad ties can be used to build stringer bridges. A licensed engineer can help operators design a safe, appropriate timber bridge.

Personnel from Virginia Tech have described in detail how to build a stringer bridge using standard bridge design procedures, for example, by placing timber stringers across the abutment, using a bent to support a trestle or timber frame. Their methods are quick and cost little.
