= Jules Cavaillès =

French painter

Jules Cavaillès (20 June 1901 – 29 January 1977) was a French painter.

== Biography ==
He was born in Carmaux. He started as a technical draughtsman during which time he met "le pere Artigue" – who was a friend of the famous pointillist artist Henri Martin – and who encouraged him to go to Paris to study fine art. In 1925 he enrolled at the Académie Julian and he began exhibiting at the various Parisian Salons from 1928 – the Société des Artistes Français, Société des Artistes Indépendants and Salon d'Automne. To fund his studies he opened a small chemist shop. He was soon invited to participate at the Salon des Tuileries and in 1936 he organised the 14th exhibition of the Artistes de ce temps in the Petit-Palais. In the same year he received the prestigious Grant Blumenthal and he was soon awarded the commission to decorate the Pavilion of Languedoc for the Exposition Universelle. He was part of a group of artists called “La Realite Poetique”. His artistic style is characterised by the juxtaposition of pure colour, derived from an interpretation of Fauvist painting which was less interested in the early Fauve artists' search for intensity and dynamism than a simple expression of ‘joie de vivre’.

He worked in oils, gouache, and pastel, and his subject matter featured figures, portraits, nudes, still lifes, flowers, landscapes, and animals.

Cavaillès died in 1977 in Épineuil. His work is represented in many leading collections and museums, including the Modern Art Museum in Paris, and the museums in Toulouse, Albi, Marseille, Chicago, and Helsinki.
