= Alzou (Ouysse) =

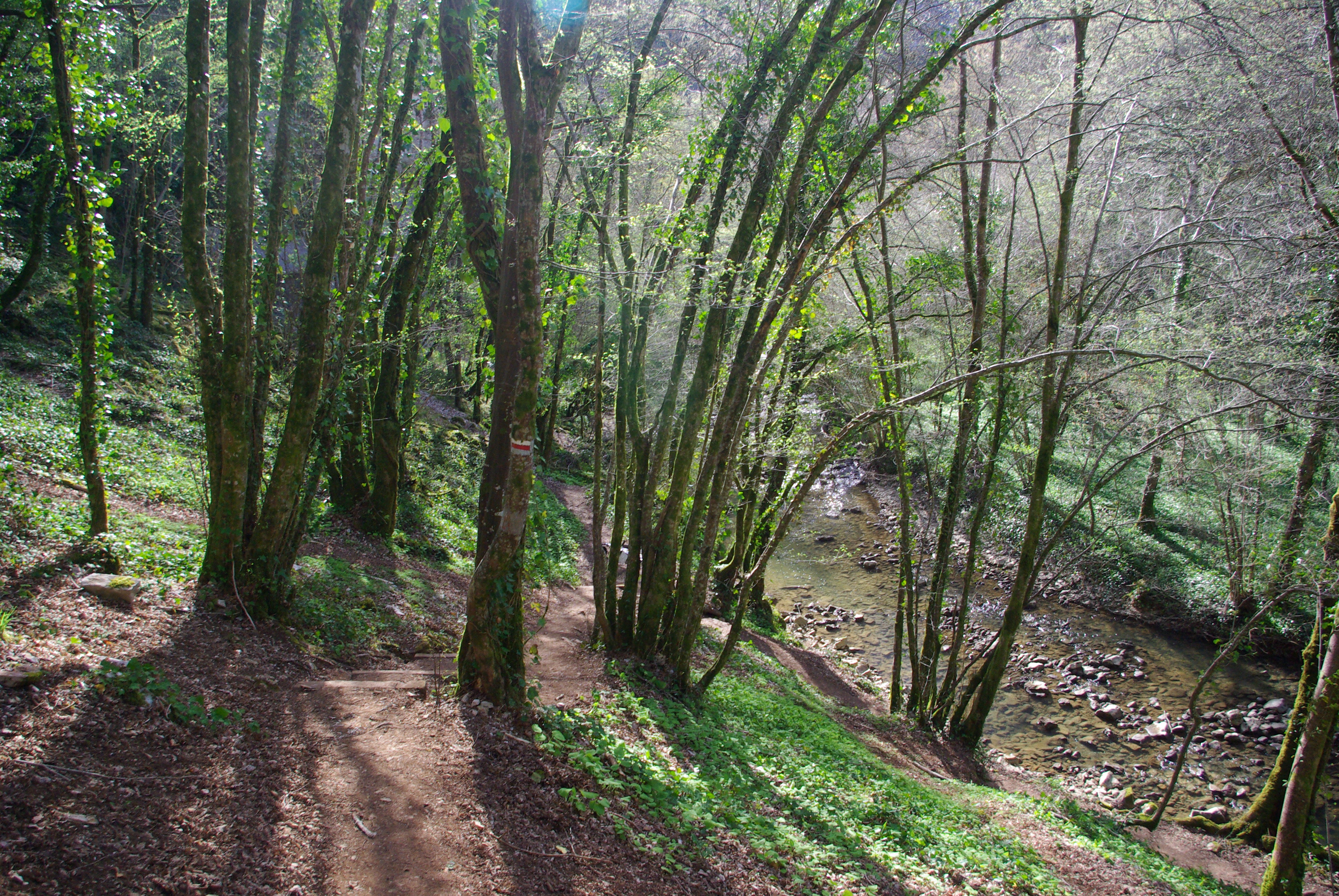
- The GR 65 hiking path winds its way alongside the Alzou.

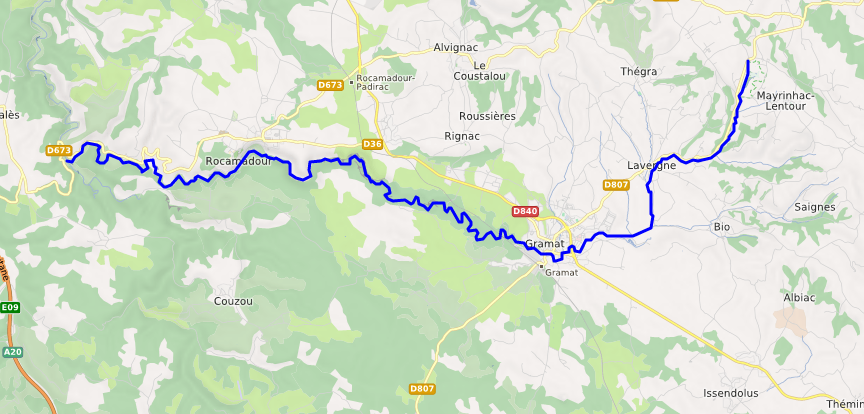

Location
- Country: France

Physical characteristics
- Mouth
  - location: Ouysse
  - coordinates: 44°47′57″N 1°33′36″E
- Length: 31 km (19 mi)

Basin features
- Progression: Ouysse→ Dordogne→ Gironde estuary→ Atlantic Ocean

The Alzou (French pronunciation: [alzu]) is a short river in the Lot département, southern France, a right tributary of the Ouysse. It is 31.4 km (19.5 mi) long. It flows through the towns of Gramat and Rocamadour, and joins the Ouysse, itself a left tributary of the Dordogne, downstream of Rocamadour. The valleys of both the Alzou and the Ouysse are deep limestone canyons.

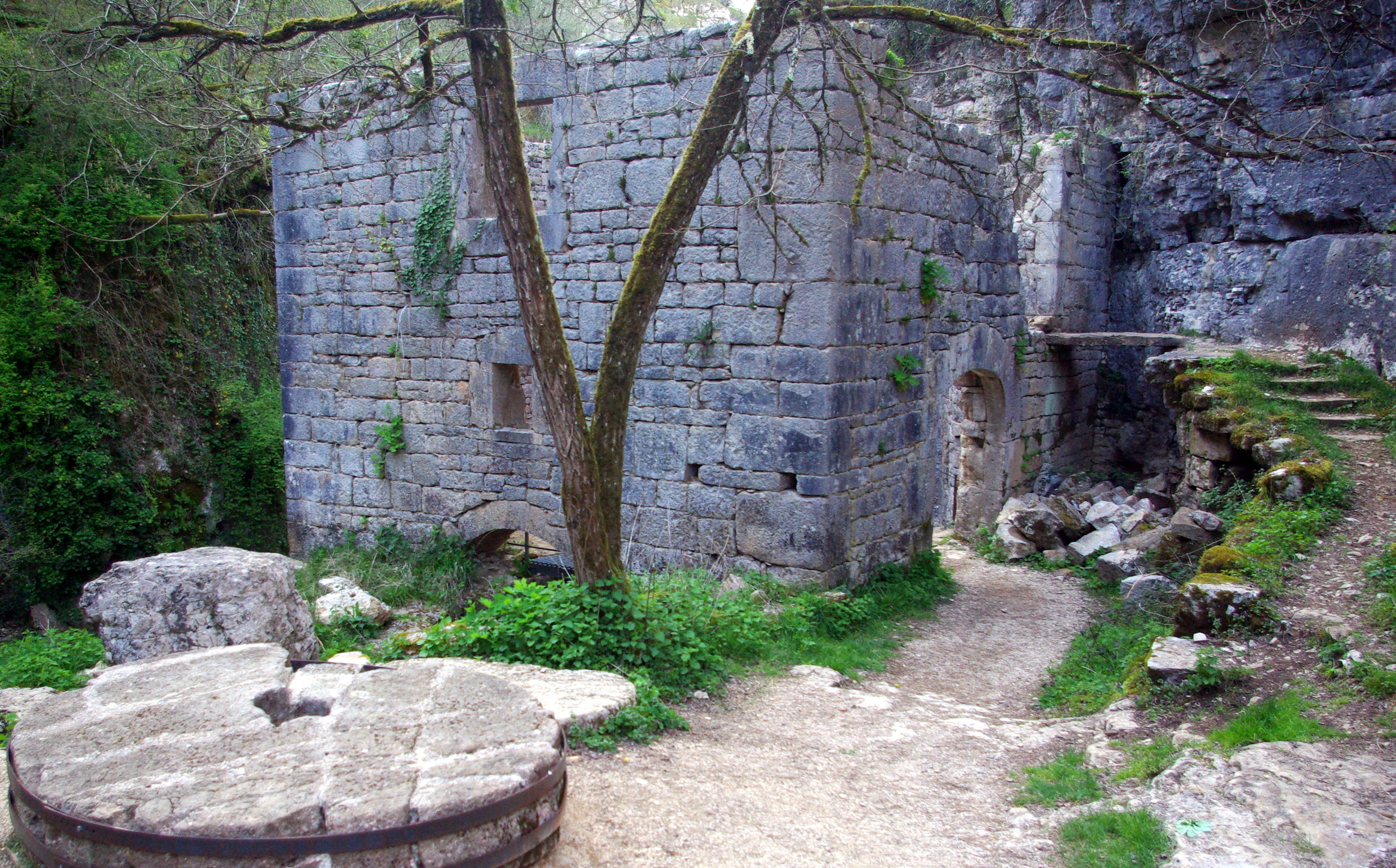
Ruins of the moulin du Saut

The river once powered the watermill moulin du Saut, whose ruins can be visited on foot.

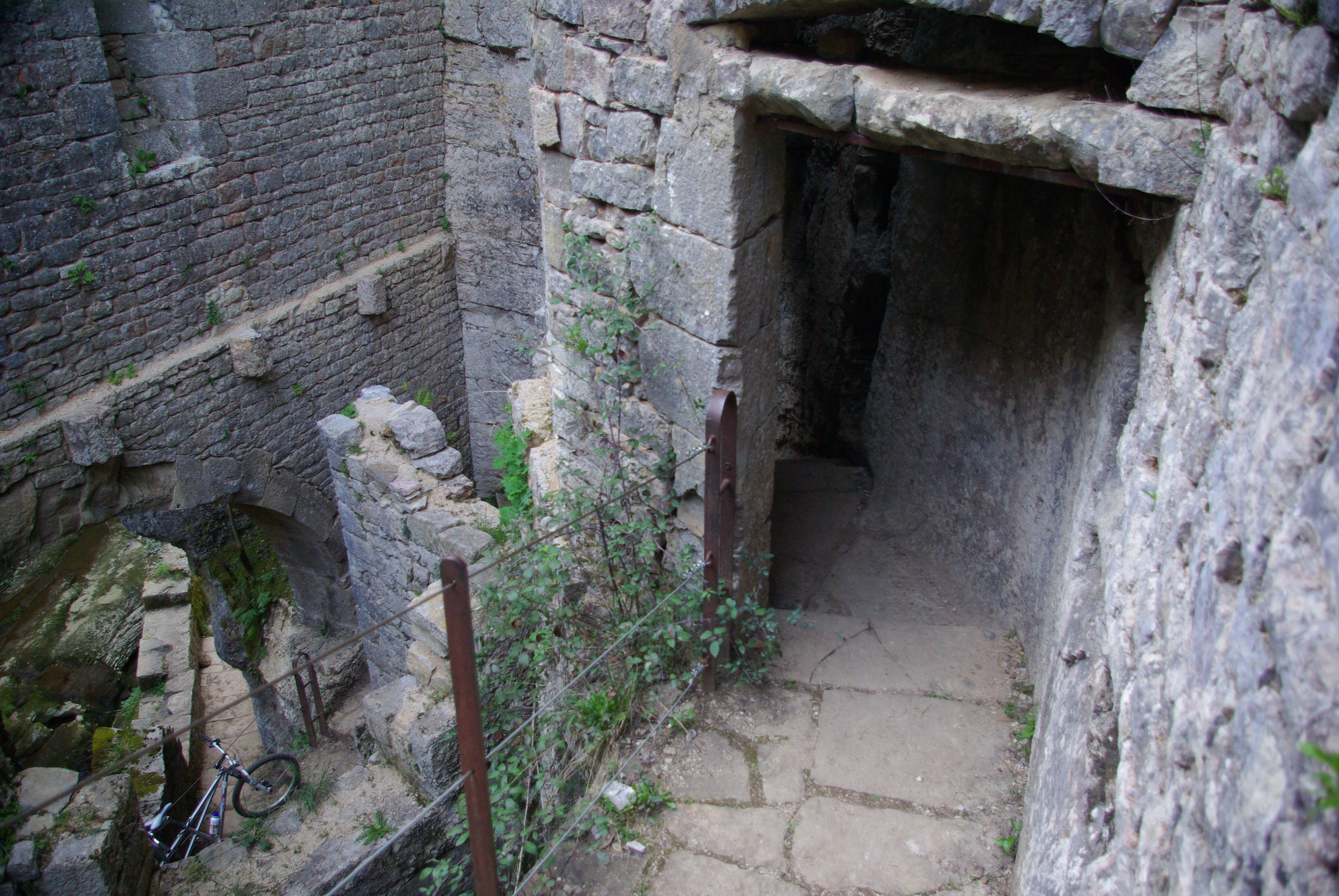
Inside the moulin du Saut

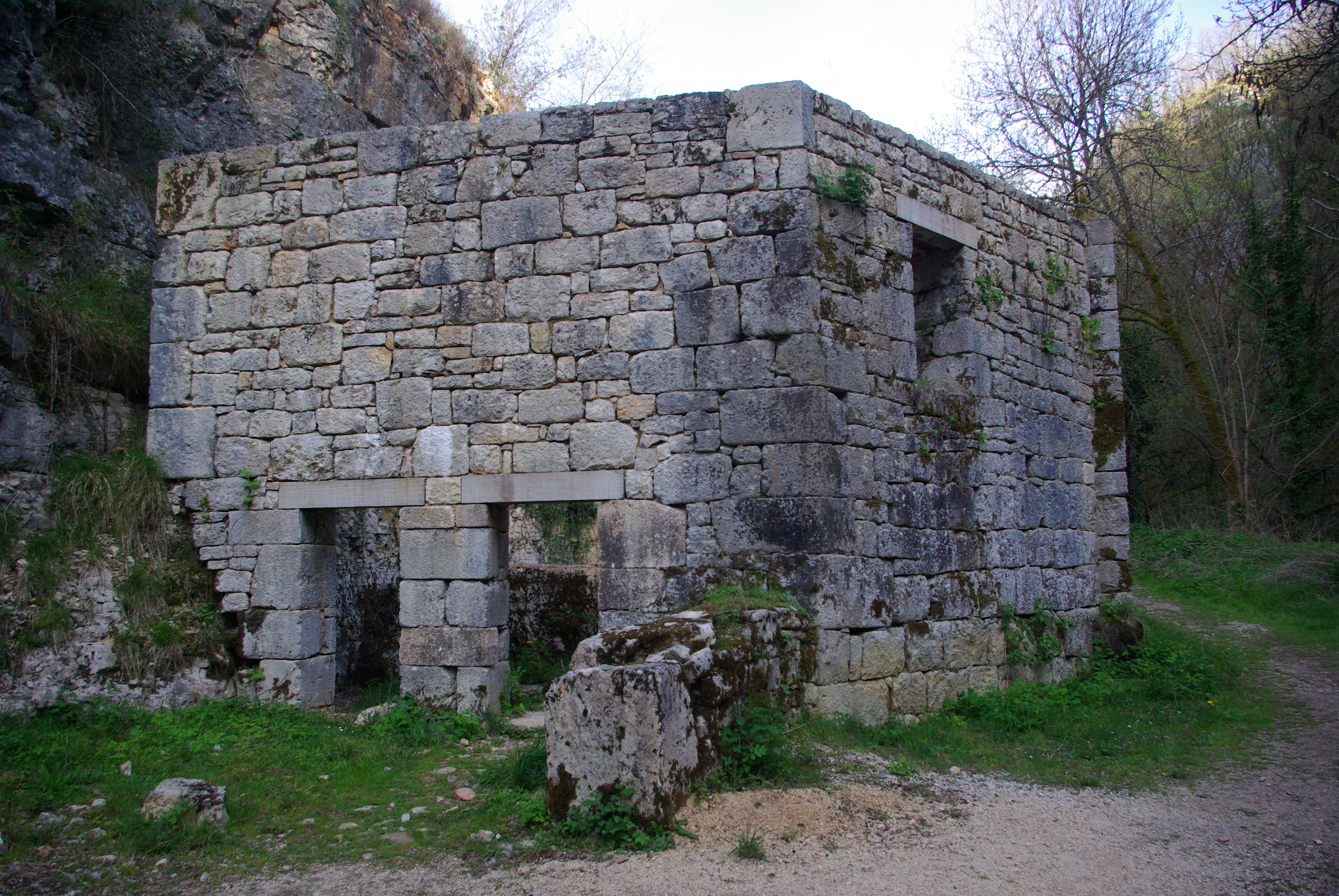
An outbuilding of the moulin du Saut

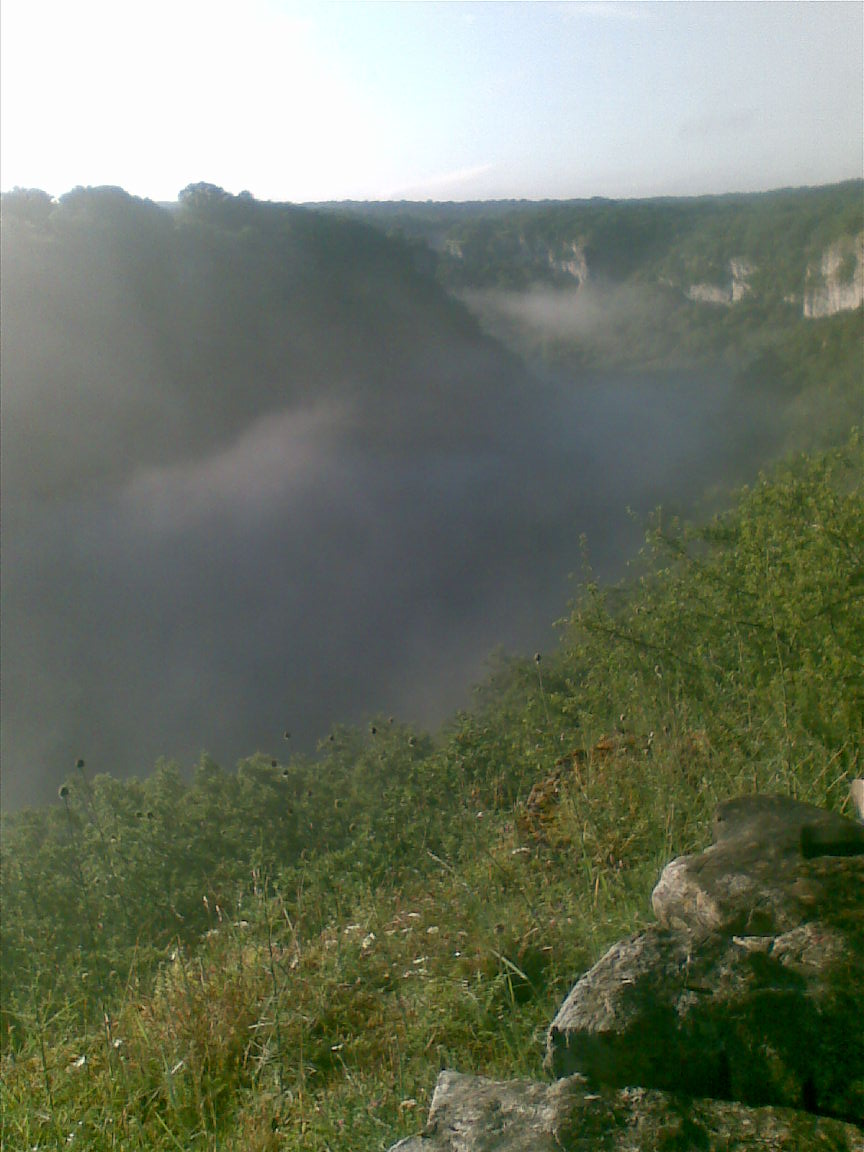
View over the Alzou valley
