= Lacave, Lot =

Lacave
- Commune
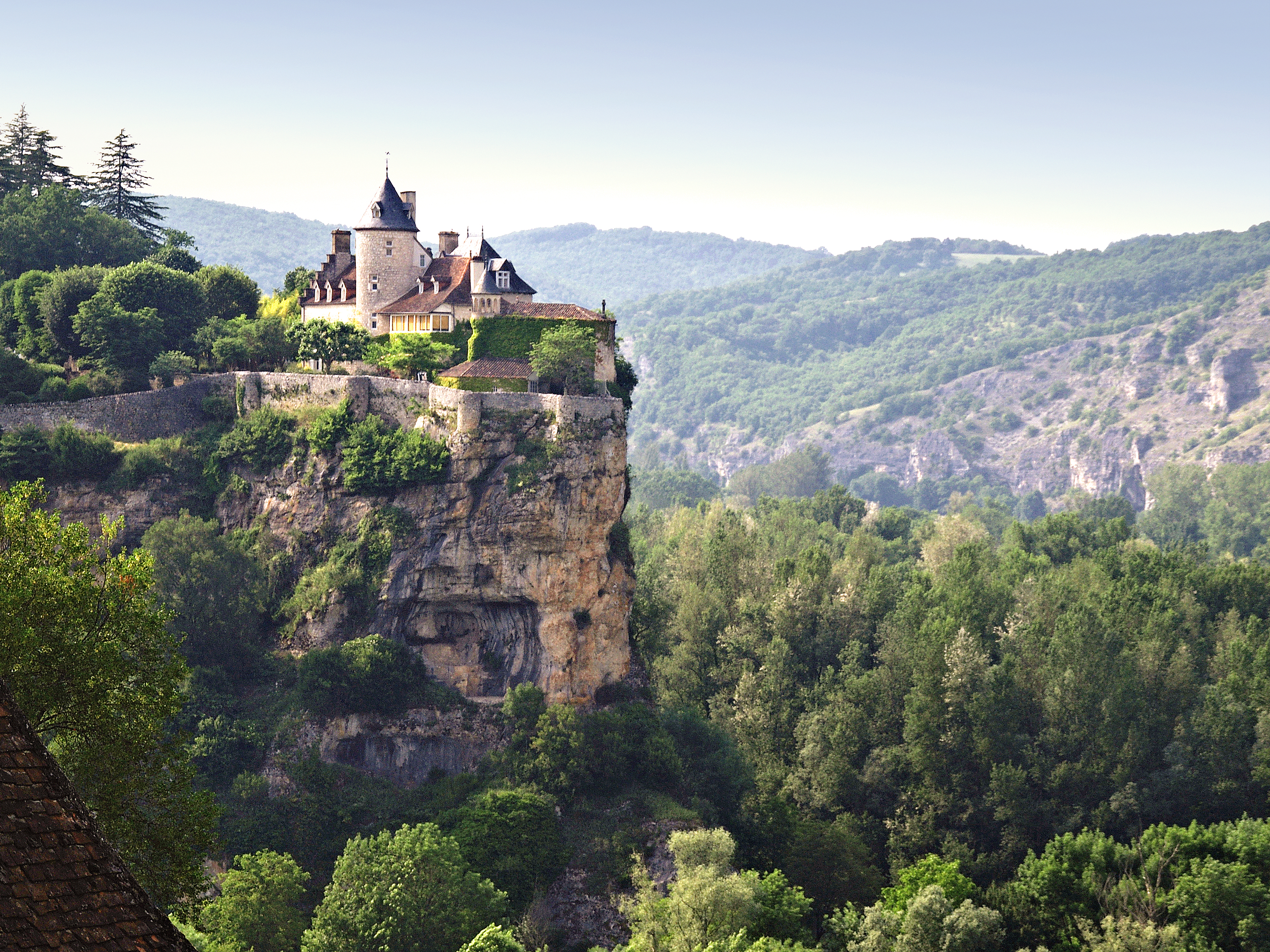
- The chateau in Lacave
- Location of Lacave
- Location within France Location within Occitanie
- Coordinates: 44°50′43″N 1°33′32″E
- Country: France
- Region: Occitania
- Department: Lot
- Arrondissement: Gourdon
- Canton: Souillac
- Intercommunality: Causses et Vallée de la Dordogne

Government
  - Mayor (2020–2026): Stéphane Chambon
- Area^{1}: 21.19 km^{2} (8.18 sq mi)
- Elevation: 100 m (330 ft)
- Highest elevation: 349 m (1,145 ft)
- Lowest elevation: 80 m (260 ft)
- Population (2023): 271
  - Density: 12.8/km^{2} (33.1/sq mi)
- Time zone: UTC+01:00 (CET)
  - Summer (DST): UTC+02:00 (CEST)
- INSEE/Postal code: 46144 /46200
- ^{1} French Land Register data, which excludes lakes, ponds, glaciers > 1 km^{2} (0.386 sq mi or 247 acres) and river estuaries.

Lacave (French pronunciation: [lakav]; Occitan: La Cava) is a commune of France, situated in the North-West of the Lot department, within the Occitanie region.

== Geography ==
Situated in the foothills of the "Causse de Gramat" at the confluence of the Dordogne and the Ouysse, 12 km from Souillac and 8 km from Rocamadour.

== History ==
Inhabited since the time of the Solutrean and Magdalenian cultures of the Paleolithic era.

== Administration ==
List of mayors
Period	Name
1989–2020	André Lestrade
2020–incumbent	Stéphane Chambon

== Population ==
At the start of the 20th century, Lacave had 519 inhabitants "with just 27 concentrated in the main town".

Historical population

Year	Pop.	±% p.a.
1793	557	—
1821	647	+0.54%
1846	647	+0.00%
1872	565	−0.52%
1901	553	−0.07%
1926	385	−1.44%
1946	324	−0.86%
1962	320	−0.08%
1968	302	−0.96%

Year	Pop.	±% p.a.
1975	270	−1.59%
1982	249	−1.15%
1990	241	−0.41%
1999	293	+2.19%
2007	289	−0.17%
2012	282	−0.49%
2017	262	−1.46%
2023	271	+0.56%

Source: EHESS and INSEE (1968–2023)

== See also ==
- Communes of the Lot department
