= Marguerite Crissay =

French artist

- Born: 1874; Mirecourt, France
- Died: 1945 (aged 70–71); Paris, France
- Known for: Painting, Sculpture

Marguerite Crissay (1874–1945) was a French artist known for her painting and sculpture.

== Biography ==
Crissay was born in 1874 in Mirecourt. She exhibited at the Société des Artistes Indépendants, the Salon des Tuileries, and the Salon d'Automne. She died in 1945 in Paris.

== Gallery ==
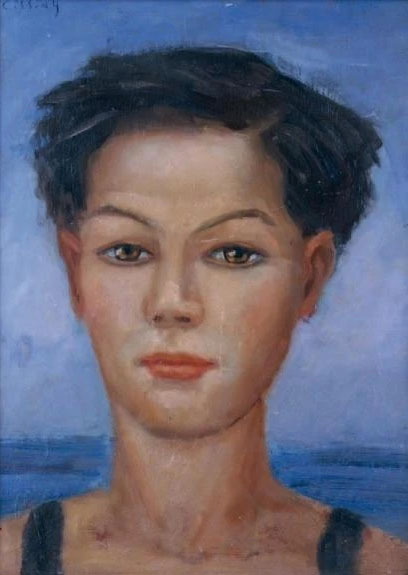
Portrait de jeune garçon

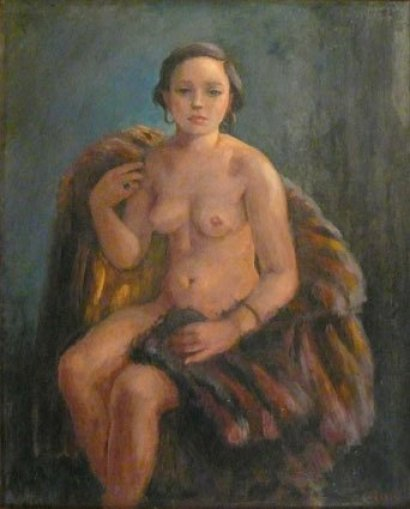
seated nude

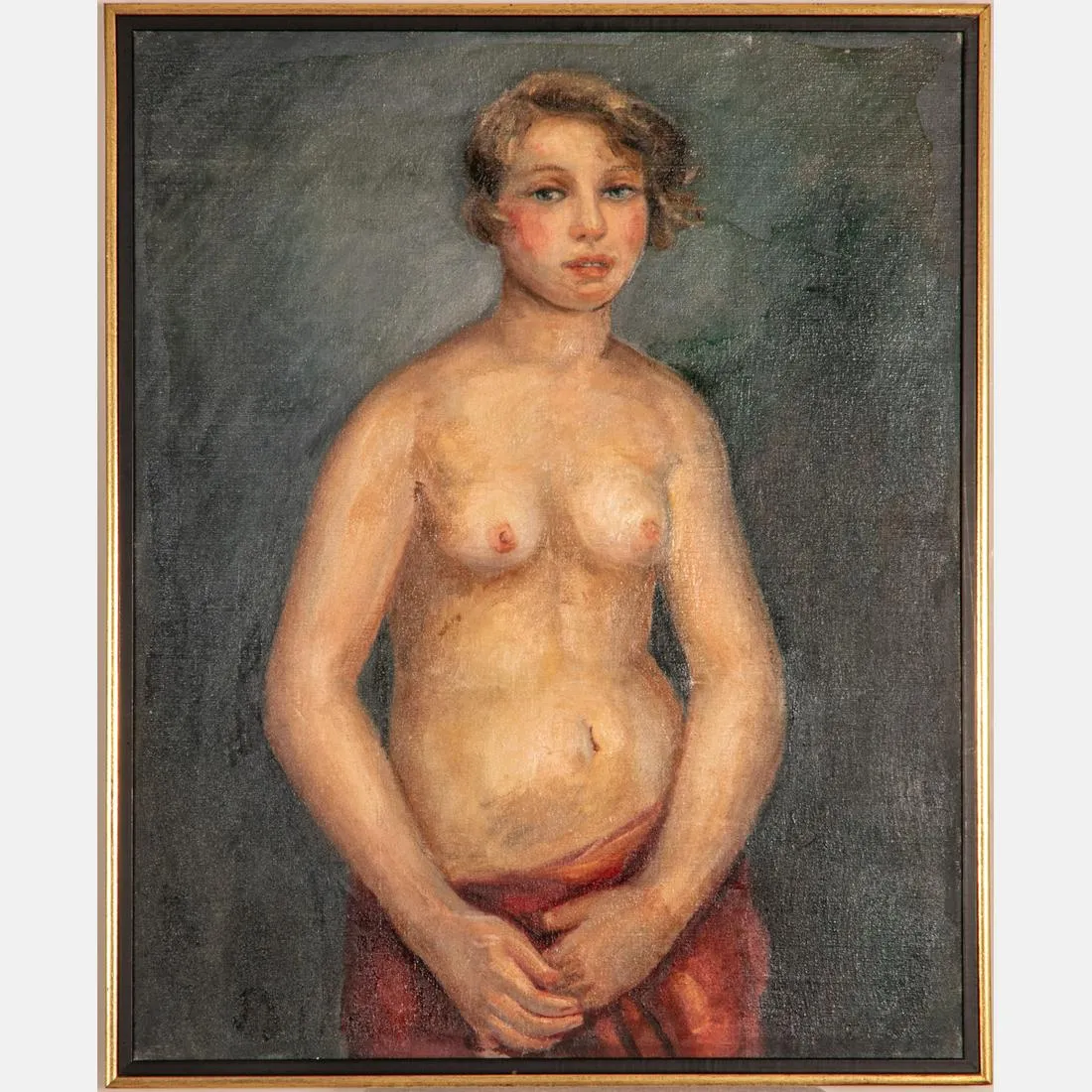
Standing nude with red wrap
