= La Pannonie =

Coordinates: 44.777189°N 1.654985°E

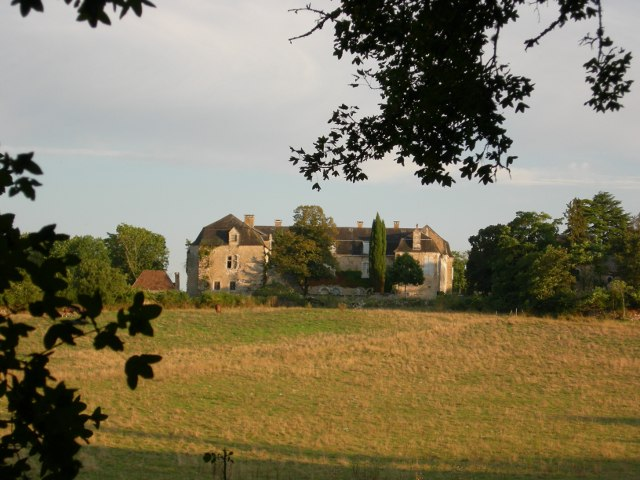
Castle of La Pannonie

La Pannonie is an old village of the Lot region, between Gramat and Rocamadour, situated since the 19th century in the commune of Couzou. Now, the village is near an old castle built in the 15th century and transformed during the 18th and 19th century.

== Toponymy ==
The "Pannonie" name caused many papers and articles about the curious homonym form with the Hungarian Pannonia. In fact, near Rocamadour, the cistercian monks of Obazine (Aubazine Abbey) created the first farm named like that. In order to be present near the famous medieval city of pilgrimage, these monks received fields and villages by donations and sellings. Realizing a new organisation, sometimes they preferred to use new names for their foundations.

The La Pannonie cistercian farm was built during the 13th century, near the ruined village of Saint-Circ (or Saint-Cyr d'Alzou).

=== Why "La Pannonie"? ===
- Did the faun "Pan" play music in La Pannonie?
- The Christian devotion of Saint Apollonia
- A Panho Family living here. Living in Gramat during the 14th century, this family could give its name to the area, like the Hebrards named the Hebrardie.
- Hungarian Cistercian Monks. The medieval cistercian network could tell Hungarian farmers to cross Europe, because this new foundation needed new inhabitants.
- The "panage" old right, created since the Latin word panagium, this ancient right authorized farmers to keep their pigs near oaks eating acorns. Used during centuries, "panage" could become "pannonie".

== Geography ==
Logo of the Naturel Regional Park of the Causses of Quercy

In the Gramat limestone area, near the wild and spectacular Alzou (Ouysse) Valley, La Pannonie is a little village between Gramat and Rocamadour. Situated in the Naturel Regional Park of the Causses of Quercy, this country is also referenced by the Natura 2000 network. Fields or forest of La Pannonie are usually closed by stone low walls. This tradition is ancient as a specific art. Each year, people found stones in fields and built new low walls. After this common task, it was easier to plough, and to keep sheep inside closed areas.

== History ==
Saint-Cyr d'Alzou, an ancient oppidum ruined at the end of the 12th century

Around the end of the 12th century, the Saint-Cyr oppidum was attacked by bands of bandits, forcing the lord and his family to flee from. Historians thought about the passage of Henry Curtmantle, gone here in 1183. This son of Henry II Plantagenet, king of England, looted Rocamadour before dying in Martel. This Saint-Cyr family (or Saint-Circ) could find protection in their suzerain's Castle, lord of Thégra. The youngest son of Saint-Cyr, named Uc (or Hugh), was born in that place. During his life, he became a very famous "troubadour" (medieval artist) in South of France, North of Italy, Portugal and Spain.

The last cistercian farm of Obazine all around Rocamadour

During the 13th century, the Obazine Abbey (Aubazine) modified her network all around Rocamadour. After her farms in the Alix, in Calès, in Couzou, in Carlucet, near Seniergues, in Bonnecoste, cistercian monks built their last foundation in La Pannonie.

The "causse" (limestone) of Gramat ruined by the Hundred Years War, famine and epidemics as the Black Death

The area of Gramat was depopulated in the 14th century. Bad harvests caused famines, and famines didn't stop epidemics like the Black Death. During that period, the river Dordogne was a frontier with English Aquitaine, and pillages by marauding mercenary armies were a frequent risk for people.

The first castle of la Pannonie, built at the end of the 15th century

After war, the Obazine Abbey preferred rent out its fields and farms. Most of them were chosen by rich families, building there "repaires", sort of little fortified castle. Traders living in the Caretta castle, in the city of Rocamadour, made the first castle of La Pannonie. Their name was "Lagrange", and the construction was made between the end of the 15th century and the first beginning of the 16th century. The de Lagrange kept their domain until the 17th century.

The Vidal de Lapize, creators of the second and so classic and charming castle of la Pannonie

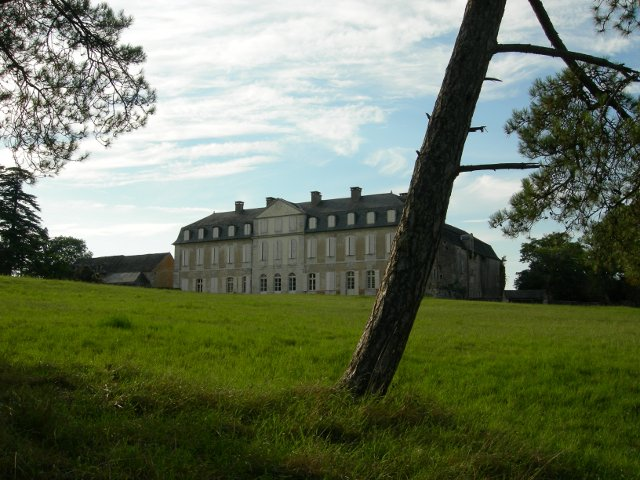
The classic facade of the La Pannonie castle

La Pannonie was bought in 1685, and the Vidal de Lapize transformed their manor to a charming palace. This construction was the most important of the 18th century in the Lot department. Plans, drawings coming from Paris inspired the classic architecture with a central pediment, and Louis XV style furniture, and gypsum sculptures with Rococo style.

During the French Revolution, farmers helped their lord's family

Very happy in their peaceful castle of La Pannonie, the Vidal de Lapize suffered the French revolutionary period because of the emigration of Antoine and his sons. So farmers protected goods and castle, and they hid the youngest son Louis-Antoine as their own son. With their help, the two daughters could pay the castle, and they could live in their childhood that they loved.

Other transformations at the end of the 19th century

At the end of the 19th century, Charles of La Pannonie, modified his castle and grounds, creating a new entrance and three ponds in a new English style grounds.

== Well-known figures ==
- Famous troubadour Uc de Saint Circ, 13th century, born in Thégra but his father was the poor lord of Saint-Cyr, near La Pannonie.
- Antoine Vidal de Lapize Lord of la Pannonie, nicknamed "Father of the Poor".
- Father de Lapize La Pannonie, who suffered the revolutionary French Terror in Paris. His account was known by the counter-revolutionary literature.
- Lady Marie-Thérèse and Lady Marie-Jeanne de Lapize de la Pannonie, "aunts of la Pannonie" who saved the castle after the French Revolution.
- Jacques Pélaprat, domestic. His souvenir is kept by the "Jacques House", near the castle.
- Charles Vidal de Lapize, Lord of la Pannonie, nicknamed the "Bon Monsieur Charles".
