= Obazine Abbey =

Abbey in Corrèze, France

Coordinates: 45°10′29″N 1°40′12″E

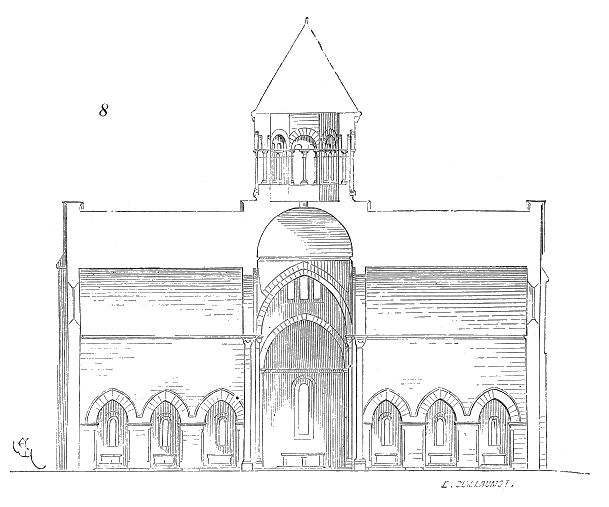
Transept of Obazine Abbey

Obazine Abbey, also known as Aubazine Abbey, was a Cistercian monastery in the present town of Aubazines in the département of Corrèze in the Limousin in France.

== History ==
The monastery was founded in about 1134 by Saint Stephen of Obazine, who after his ordination, with another priest, Pierre, began the eremitical life. They attracted a number of followers and with the sanction of Eustorge, Bishop of Tulle, built a monastery on a site granted them by the Viscount Archambault.

Before 1142 they had no established rule; however, in this year, St. Stephen was clothed with the regular habit. He had Cistercian monks train his followers in their mode of life, and affiliated his abbey to that of Cîteaux in 1147. As their number increased, several foundations were made. Before the Cistercian affiliation, the Abbey had a feminine monastery in Coyroux with a high closure. In Cîteaux, this organization wasn't common, but it improved the good reputation of Obazine.

The Obazine Abbey had foundations in Limousin and Quercy, as farms all around Rocamadour, a famous sacred place of pilgrimage. These Cistercian farms were situated in Alix, Calès, Bonnecoste, Couzou, Carlucet, near Séniergues, and the last at La Pannonie. That ring of Cistercian presence in Quercy was able to provide furnish wood and food to pilgrims, to the monks of Rocamadour and to Obazine. They were not able however survive after the Hundred Years' War. Some of them became little castles, such as La Pannonie and Bonnecoste, while others disappeared.

Among the most distinguished abbots of Obazine were François d'Escobleau (d. 1628), Archbishop of Bordeaux, and Charles de la Roche-Aymon (d. 1777), Cardinal Archbishop of Reims. The abbey was suppressed and its property confiscated by the government during the French Revolution in 1791. The government then converted the abbey into a bordello for the remainder of the decade.

== Church ==
The structure of the abbey church survived the Revolution and now after restoration serves as the parish church of Aubazines.

== Gallery ==
Obazine Abbey
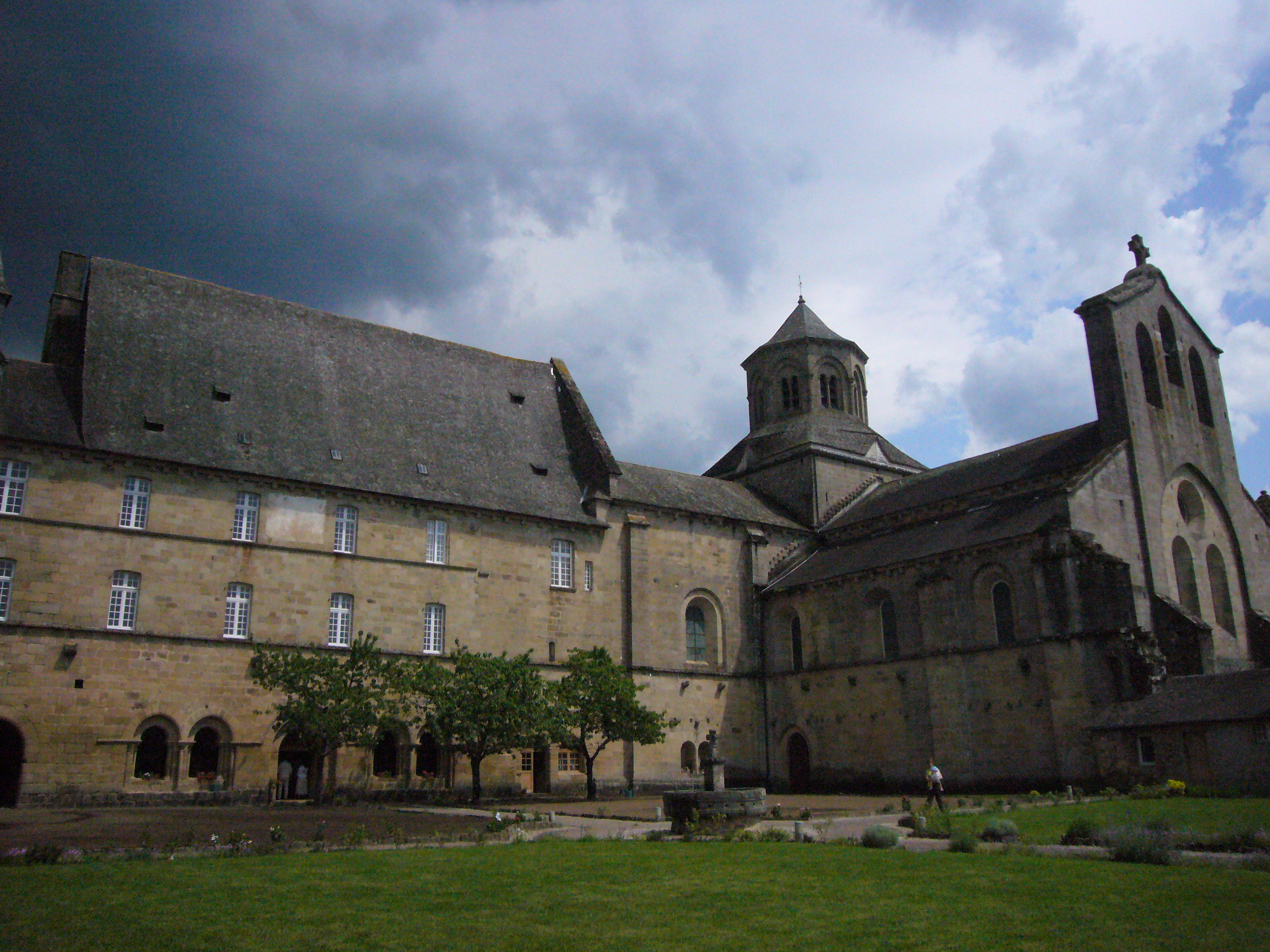
Church and monastery building from the northwest

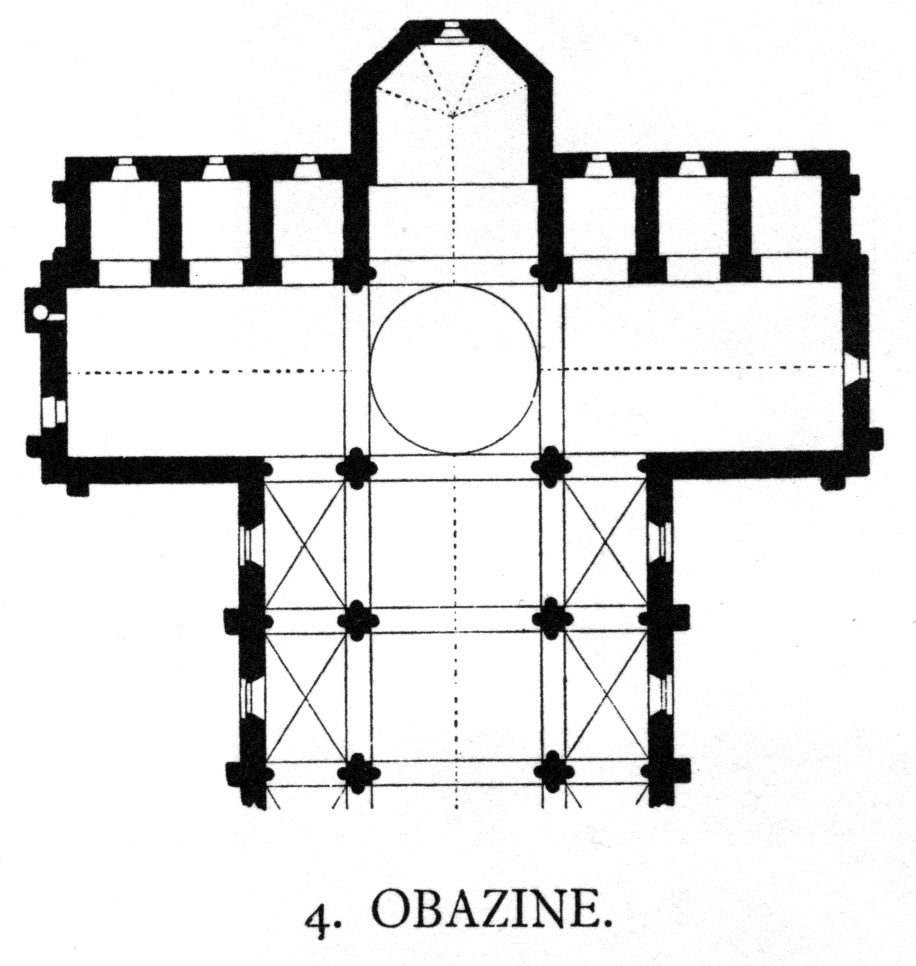
Floor plan of the church

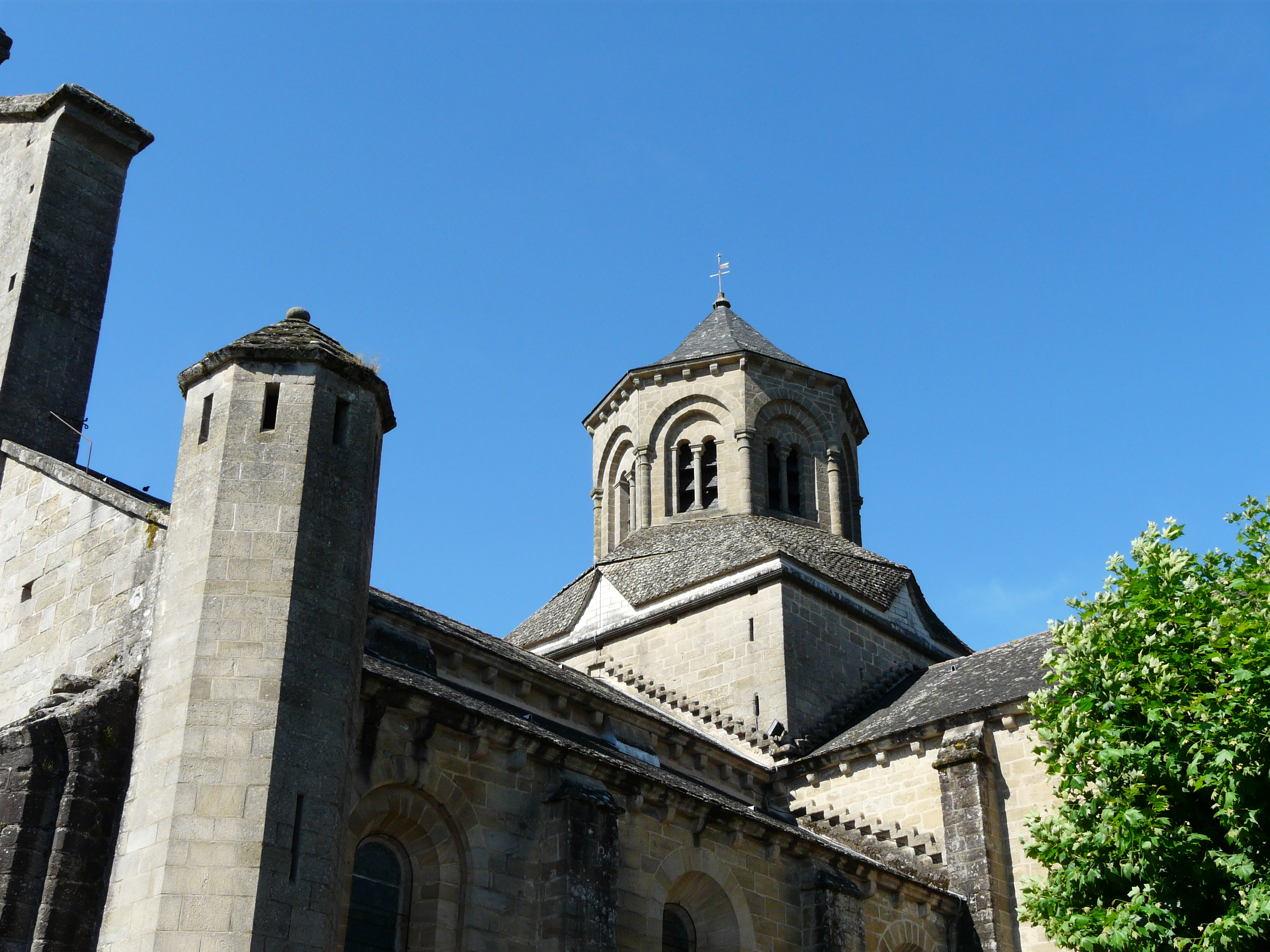
Octagonal crossing tower

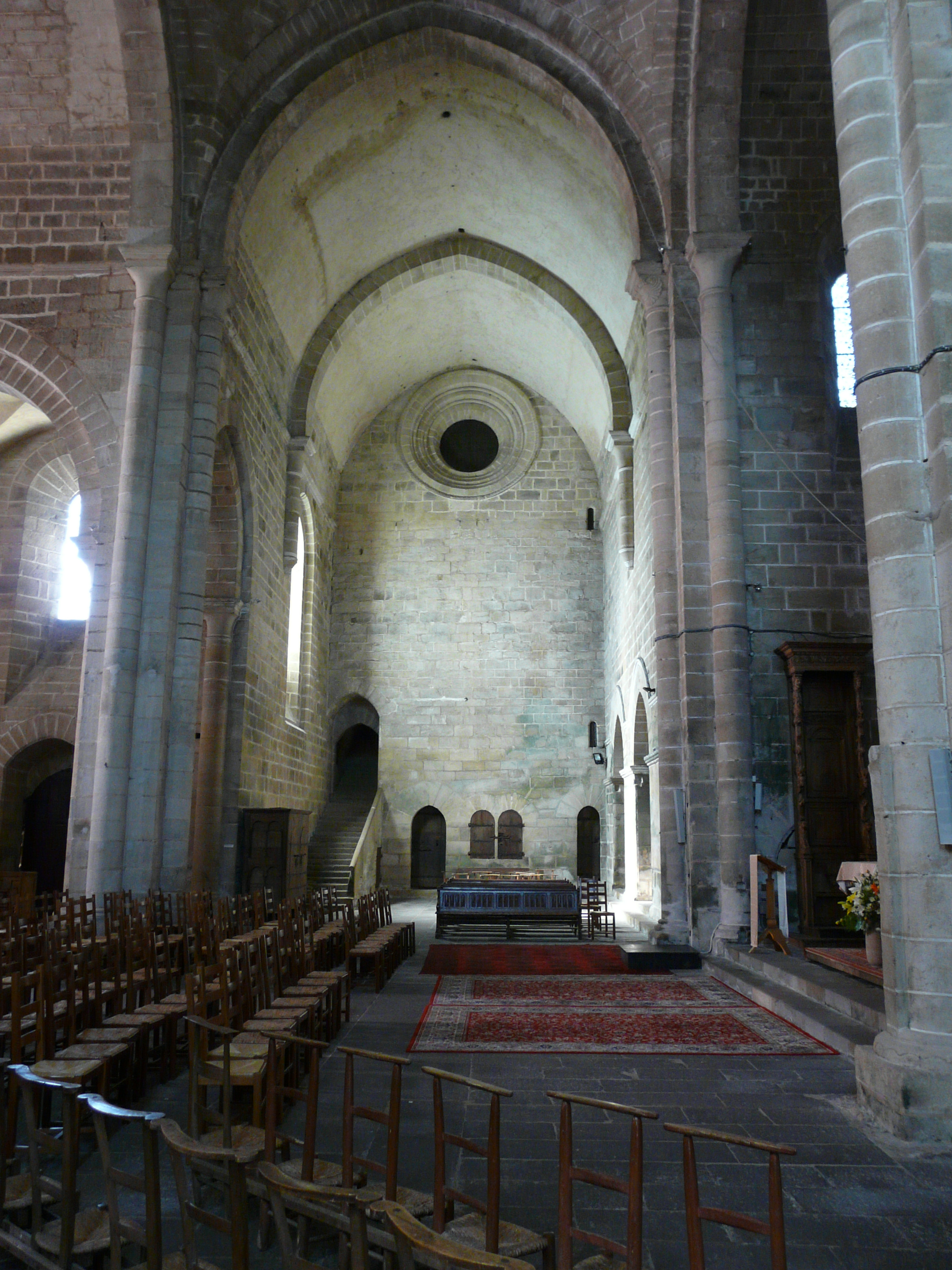
North Transept

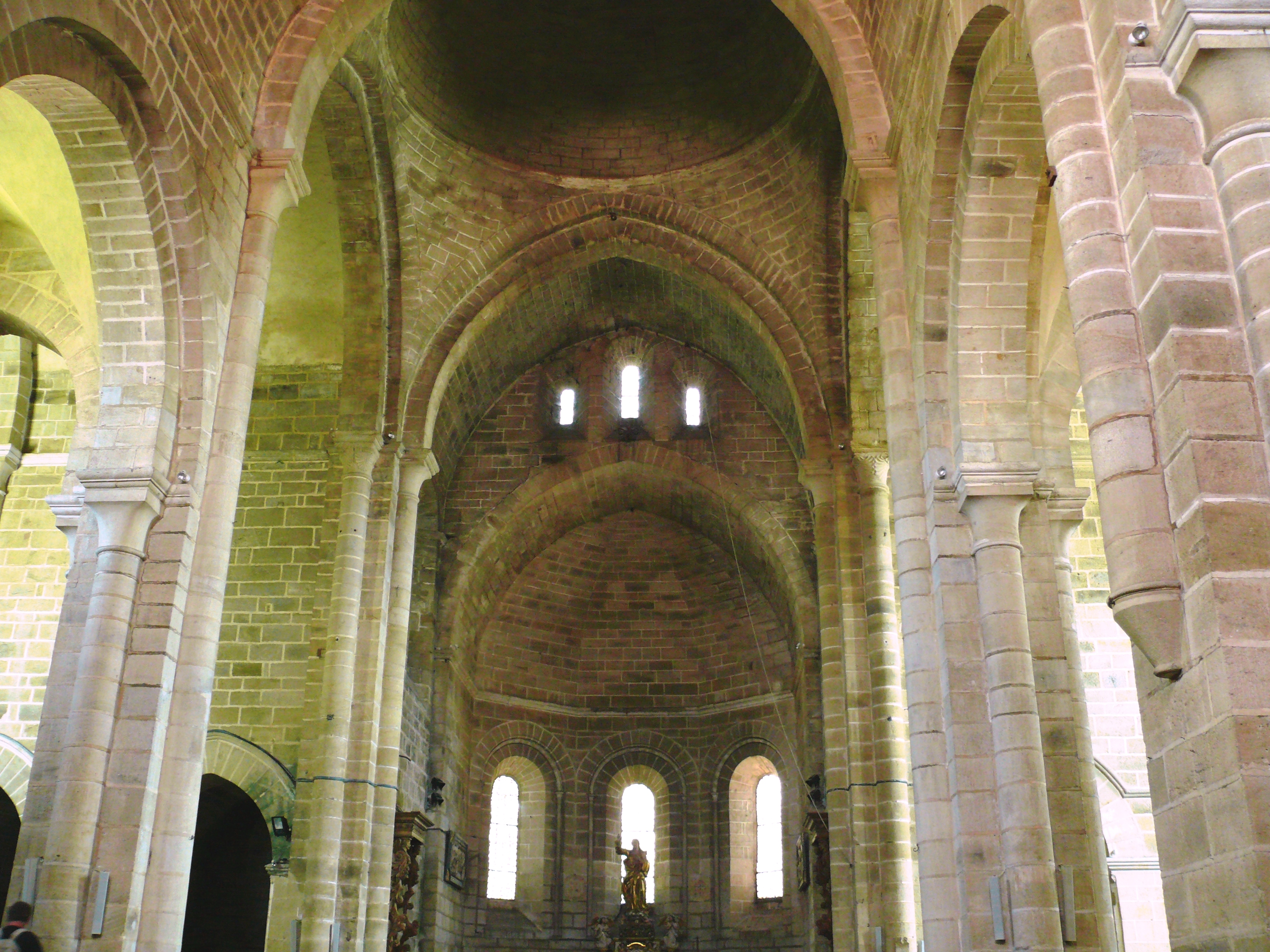
Crossing and choir

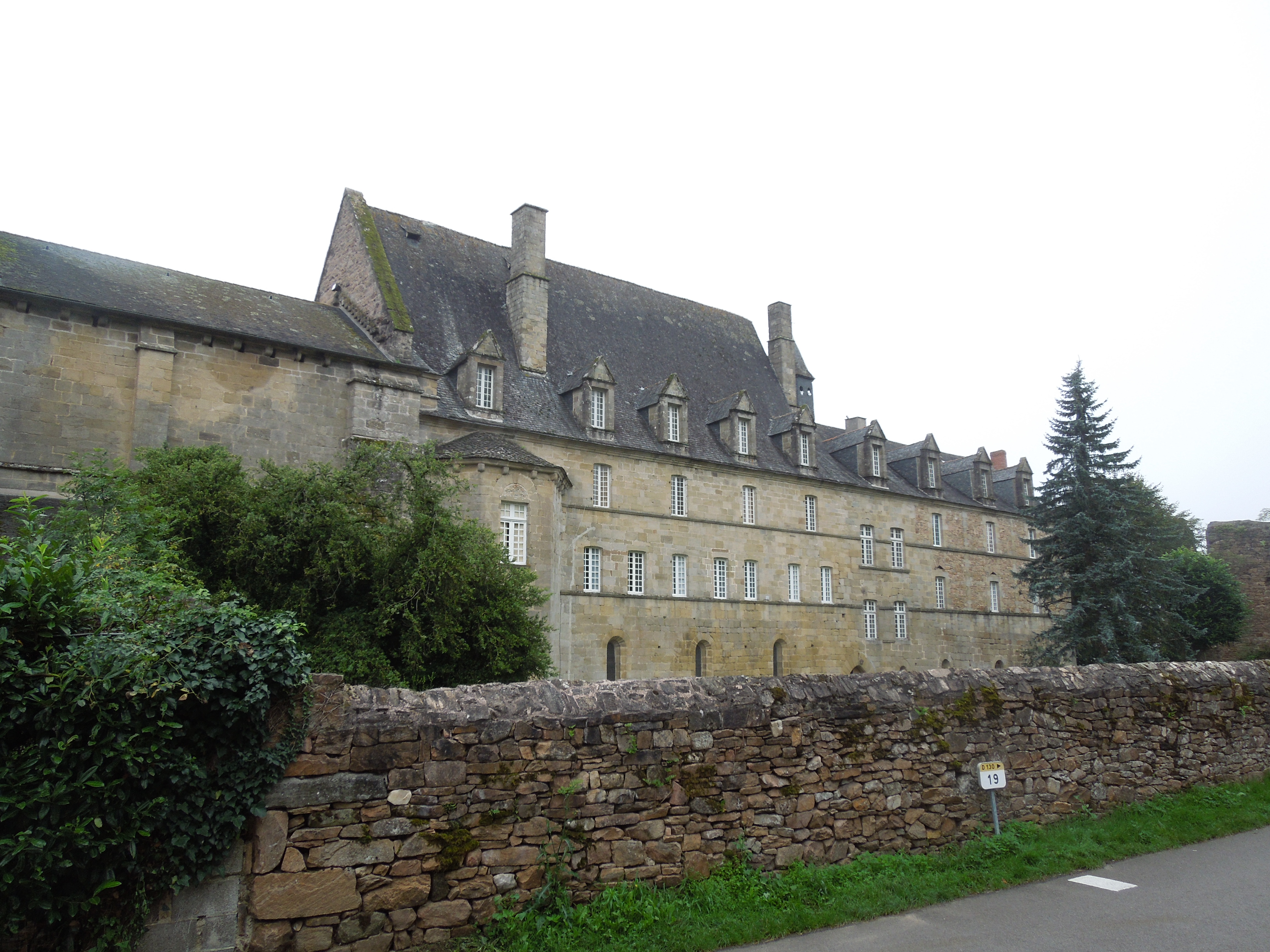
Living quarters of the monastery

== See also ==
- High medieval domes
