= Saint Amadour =

Christian hermit and saint

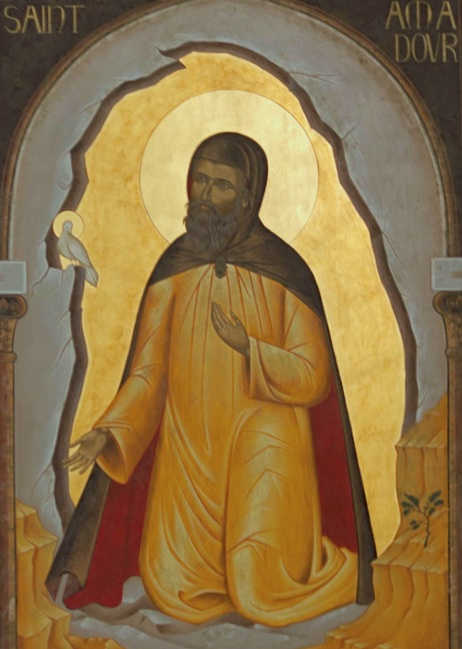
Icon of Saint Amadour in the Crypt Saint-Amadour

Saint Amadour is the legendary founder of the shrine of Our Lady of Rocamadour in France. He is believed to have been a hermit. His feast day is 20 August. There is also a legendary pilgrimage path closeby to his shrine.

== Legend ==
In 1166, an ancient tomb containing an unidentified body was found at Rocamadour near the entrance to the Notre-Dame chapel. Popular piety gave him the name of Amator, “lover”, “friend” of God, typical of courtly literature of the time. The legend of Amadour began to develop about this time.

He was identified with Zaccheus of the Gospel, and husband of St. Veronica. Driven forth from Palestine by persecution, Amadour and Veronica embarked in a frail skiff and, guided by an angel, landed on the coast of Aquitaine, where they met Bishop St. Martial, who was preaching the Gospel in the southwest of Gaul. After journeying to Rome, where he witnessed the martyrdoms of Sts. Peter and Paul. Amadour, having returned to France, on the death of his spouse, withdrew to a wild spot where he built a chapel in honour of the Blessed Virgin, near which he died a little later.

Like similar legends, this account does not appear till long after the age in which the chief actors are deemed to have lived. The name of Amadour occurs in no document previous to the compilation of his Acts, which cannot be judged older than the twelfth century. The mention of the third century St. Martial in a first century tale would tend to prove the "Acts of St. Amadour" a forgery.

It is considered probable that the story of Amadour is completely unfounded, and that he himself may be a wholly imaginary person. There is no factual foundation for identifying him with Saint Amator, a bishop of Auxerre.

== Present day ==
The Shrine of Our Lady of Rocamadour is under the auspices of the Diocese of Cahors which holds that the remains could be those of one of the hermits established in the Alzou canyon from the 7th century, and whose cave could have been the first chapel of the site.

Since 2016, which marked the 850th anniversary of the discovery of the body of Saint Amadour, the relics are exhibited in a reliquary in the basilica.

== Sources ==
- Holweck, F. G. A Biographical Dictionary of the Saints. St. Louis, Missouri, US: B. Herder Book Co., 1924.
- catholic.org
