= Amator =

Catholic bishop and saint

Saint Amator of Auxerre
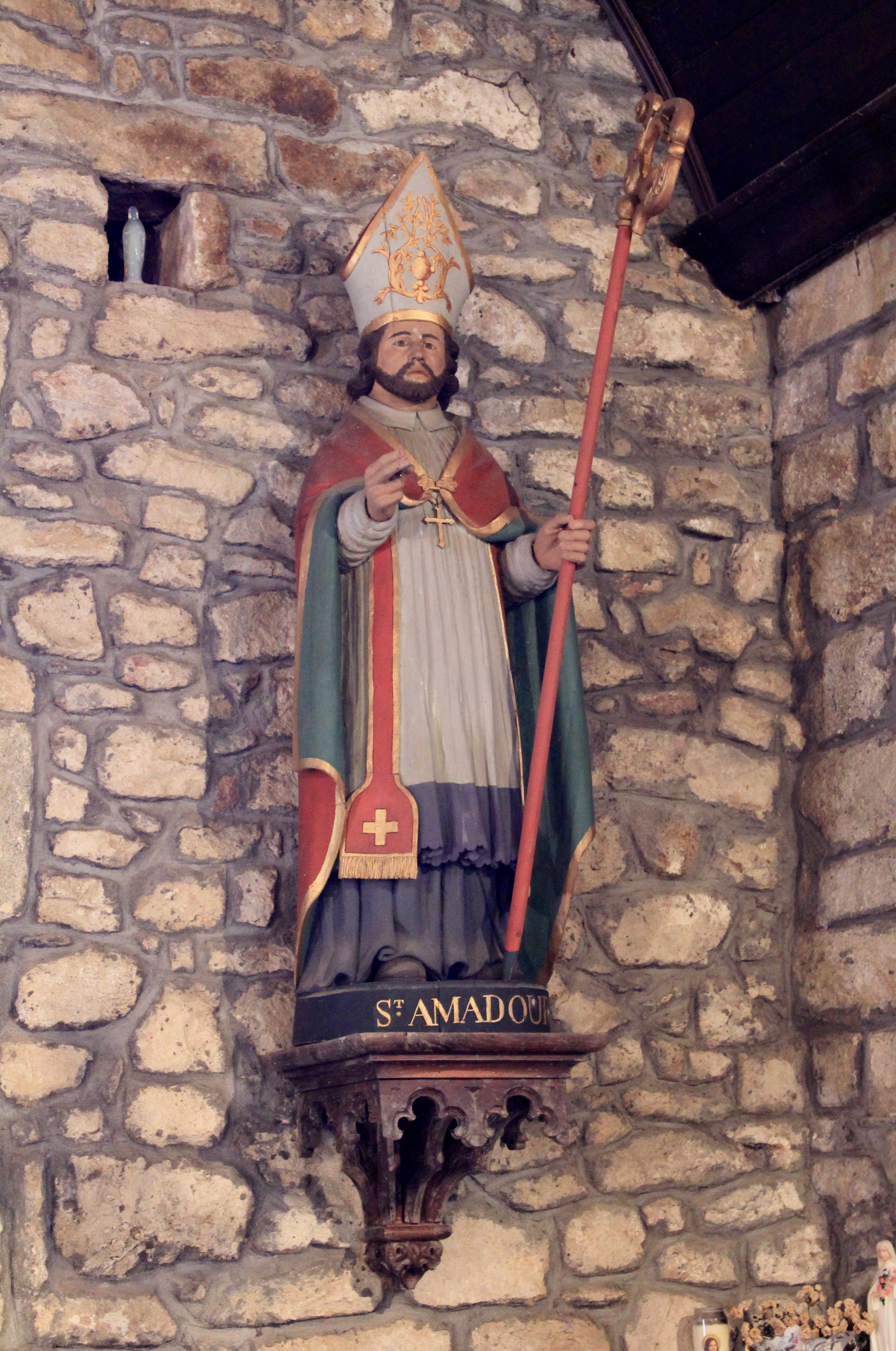
- St. Amador, Chapelle de Locadour, Kervignac
- Died: 1 May 418
- Canonized: Pre-Congregation
- Feast: 1 May
- Attributes: bishop with axe and tree

Amator (in French) Amadour or Amatre was bishop of Auxerre from 388 until his death on 1 May 418 and venerated as a saint in the Catholic Church. Amator's feast day is celebrated on 1 May.

== Amator of Auxerre ==
Amator was of a wealthy, upper-class family in Auxerre, France. He studied theology under Valerian, Bishop of Auxerre, but married a holy woman of Langres, venerated locally as Saint Martha, in order to please his parents. When he and his bride went to church to receive the nuptial benediction, Bishop Valerian, by mistake, or, as some think, by a special interposition of Providence, pronounced over them the office of consecration to the service of God, instead of the marriage prayer. After their wedding, they mutually agreed to live together as brother and sister. Martha subsequently became a nun and Amator received the clerical tonsure.

He later succeeded Eladius as Bishop of Auxerre in 388 and governed the see until his death 30 years later. During this 30-year episcopacy, he built two churches and converted the remaining pagans in his diocese. He introduced the relics of Saint Cyricus into France, thus propagating this saint's cult.

Germanus was one of the six dukes, entrusted by the emperor with the government of the Gallic provinces. He resided at Auxerre. At length he incurred the displeasure of Bishop Amator by hanging hunting trophies on a certain tree, which in earlier times had been the scene of pagan worship. Amator remonstrated with him in vain. One day when the duke was absent, the bishop had the tree cut down and the trophies burnt. Fearing the anger of the duke, who wished to kill him, he fled and appealed to the prefect Julius for permission to confer the tonsure on Germain. This being granted, Amator, who felt that his own life was drawing to a close, returned. When the duke came to the church, Amator caused the doors to be barred and gave him the tonsure against his will, telling him to live as one destined to be his successor, and forthwith made him a deacon. When in a short time Amator died, Germain was unanimously chosen to succeed him as bishop. Germanus subsequently wrote a biography of Amator. In the Middle Ages, a certain Stephen also composed a life of Amator, but it is considered a work of fiction.

J. B. Bury suggests that Amator ordained Saint Patrick to the diaconate at Auxerre; and that he was later ordained priest by Amator's successor Germanus of Auxerre in a church in Auxerre dedicated to Amator. However, this may actually refer to Palladius, whom historian Kathleen Hughes regards as more probable a deacon of Germanus, and that Germanus sent him to Rome,

Amator died in 418 and was buried in the church which he had built in honour of the Martyr Saint Symphorian, and which later bore his own name. He is said to have been distinguished by the gift of miracles, both before and after his death.

=== Iconography ===
He is depicted as a bishop with an axe and tree.

Amator is sometimes confused with a hermit of legend whose feast day is 20 August. A tradition in Autun also designates him as its first bishop, with an occupancy date of 250, tying him to the seven bishops sent to evangelise Gaul in the time of Decius.

== Amator and Rocamadour ==
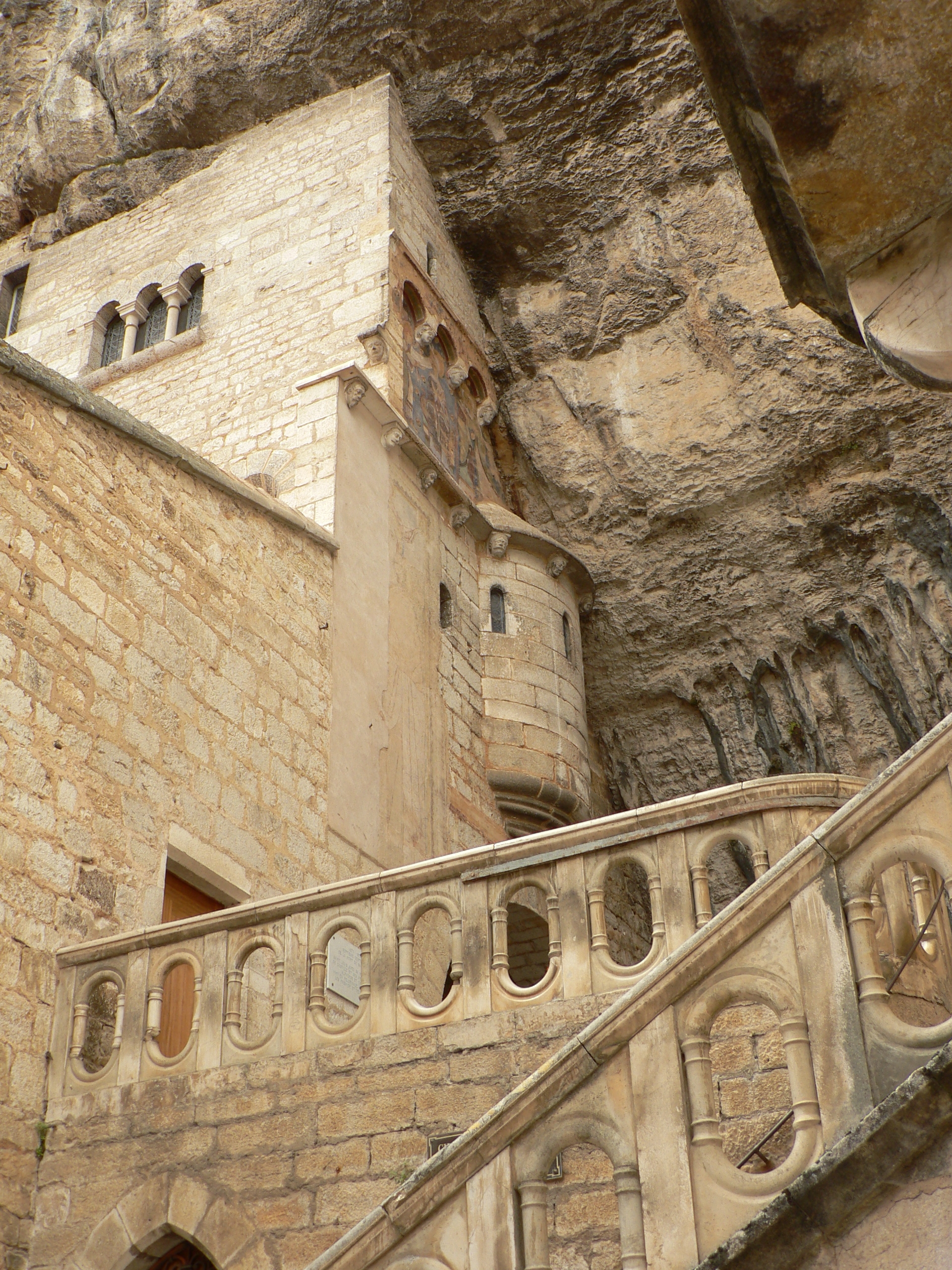
The sanctuary of Rocamadour

The commune of Rocamadour is said to have been named after Amator, who is believed to have been the founder of the ancient sanctuary. The crypt Saint-Amadour is situated here. The church of Notre Dame (1479) contains a wooden Black Madonna reputed to have been carved by Amator.

Amadour was identified with the Biblical Zacheus, the tax collector of Jericho mentioned in Luke 19:1-10. He is thought to have married Veronica, who wiped Jesus' face on the way to Calvary. Driven out of Palestine by persecution, Amadour and Veronica embarked in a frail skiff and, guided by an angel, landed on the coast of Aquitaine. After journeying to Rome, where he witnessed the martyrdoms of Peter and Paul, Amadour, having returned to France, on the death of his spouse, withdrew to a wild spot in Quercy where he built a chapel in honour of the Blessed Virgin, near which he died a little later.

Amator's Acts cannot be dated as being older than the 12th century. It is now well established that Martial, Amadour's contemporary in the legend, lived in the 3rd not the 1st century, and Rome has never included him among the members of the Apostolic College. The untrustworthiness of the legend has led some recent authors to suggest that Amadour was an unknown hermit or the actual bishop of Auxerre of the same name.

== The Portuguese Amator ==
Confusion is added by the fact that there is also a Amator (Portuguese: Amador of Portugal) whose feast day is celebrated on 27 March. He was a hermit of Portugal, and several churches in the diocese of Guarda and elsewhere in Portugal are dedicated to him. A "San Amador" is the patron saint of the Spanish town of Martos.
