= Publicani =

Occupation in antiquity

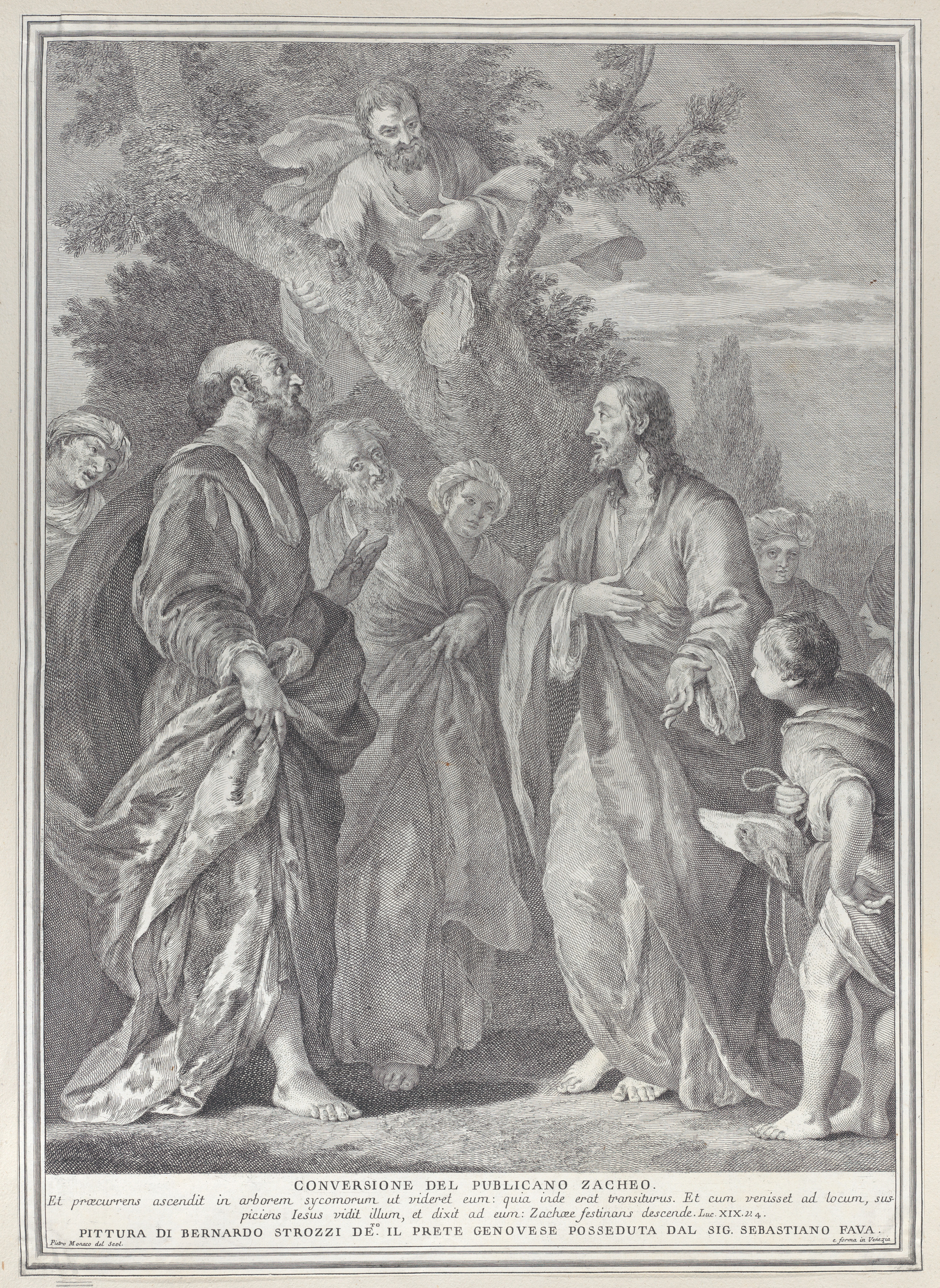
Conversion of Zacchaeus (Pietro Monaco, 1730s): Jesus (right) addresses a publicanus (left); Zacchaeus watches from a tree.

The publicani (Latin sing. publicanus, anglicised publican; Greek sing. τελώνης telōnēs) were public contractors in the Roman Republic and Empire. In their official capacity, they often supplied the Roman legions and military, managed the collection of port duties, and oversaw public building projects. In addition, they served as tax collectors for the Roman Republic (and later the Roman Empire), farming the taxes of the Roman provinces, and bidding on contracts for the collection of various types of taxes. Importantly, this role as tax collectors was not emphasized until late into the history of the Republic. The publicans were usually of the class of equites.

During the republican era, civil service, which was the size of modern middle-sized city governments, dealt with organising public policy for nearly thirty million people. The solution for the day-to-day operation of public administration was the extensive use of private contracting in the implementation of public policies. The earliest accounts of contracting describe contracts for feeding sacred geese, which were honoured for warning the citizens of Rome of approaching enemies, on the hill of Capitolium in Rome in 390 BC.

Private organisations, societas publicanorum, and their managers, the publicani, took care of most public works, such as constructing public buildings, supplying equipment for the army, operating mines and, most importantly, collecting taxes. The societies bid for government contracts to do particular jobs. As in modern-day societies, those who offered the lowest price won construction deals, and those who guaranteed the highest amount of collected taxes for the Senate succeeded won tax collection deals. The managers of the societies hired or laid off workers to suit the particular job they were doing.

The societas publicanorum were probably the first type of limited liability shareholder-owned companies. A legal structure for limiting liability in purely private business activity did not exist at the time. To limit personal liability, which could lead to slavery and the confiscation of all personal property, early entrepreneurs invented the practice of common slave ownership, in which a jointly owned slave served as chief executive officer of the enterprise. As slaves were 'things' responsible for only their own cost, they liberated the owners of their personal liabilities.

== History ==
At the height of the Roman Republic's era of provincial expansion (roughly 146 BC until the end of the Republic in 27 BC) the Roman tax farming system was very profitable for the publicani. The right to collect taxes for a particular region would be auctioned every few years for a value that (in theory) approximated the tax available for collection in that region. The payment to Rome was treated as a loan and the publicani would receive interest on their payment at the end of the collection period. In addition, any excess (over their bid) tax collected would be pure profit for the publicani. The principal risk to the publicani was that the tax collected would be less than the sum bid.

In the Roman Republic, the distinction between politics and business was clear-cut. Senators could not take part in the management of the societas publicanorum or other business activities, but they could be shareholders of the companies. Likewise, private contractors could not enter seats in the Senate. Consequently, the publicani, as the most influential group in the order of the knights, became part of the power-balancing mechanism of ancient Rome.

Tax farming deals in newly acquired eastern provinces in Asia Minor proved to be a highly lucrative source of income for the companies, which placed publicani in competitive positions with the appointed local governors of the provinces. Also, the exclusion of the publicani from the Senate opened up positions for them in the special courts, allowing them to weigh the limits and practices of government power.

The actions of the publicani were fiercely criticised. They were accused of insurance fraud in delivering goods during the Punic wars, of excessive greed when collecting taxes in the provinces, of exceptionally cruel conduct towards slave labour working in the mines, and of fraudulent practices in trying to get rid of unprofitable public contracts. However, surviving literary sources are mainly based on accounts of senators, who were in a competitive position with the publicani. Still, the overall operation of the private contractors seems to have supplied satisfactory results for the management of the Republic.

The degradation of the role of private contracting coincided with the beginning of the rule of the emperors, during which the oligarchic power of the Senate had to give way for the autocratic rule of the Caesars, and a more centralised public civil service system replaced private contractors in implementing the most important parts of public policy. However, the equestrian order, to which the publicani belonged, formed the backbone of the population from which civil servants were recruited. Throughout history, the publicani, or, more precisely, their local henchmen, were probably best known from their minor local tax collecting duties in Roman provinces during the imperial era

By New Testament times, the provincial people came to see the publicans chiefly as tax collectors. It is in this sense that the term is used in Jesus' parable of the Pharisee and the Publican. However, their role as public contractors, especially as regards building projects, was still significant. With the rise of a much larger Imperial bureaucracy, this task of the publicans, as well as their overall importance, declined precipitously. Evidence for the existence of publicans extends as far back as the 3rd century BC, although it is generally assumed that they existed at still earlier times in Roman history. Knowledge of a tentative terminus post quem is taken from the histories of the 1st century AD Imperial historian Livy.

== See also ==
- Matthew the Apostle
- Mütesellim
- Zacchaeus

== Sources ==
- Badian, Ernst (1983). Publicans and Sinners. Cornell University Press. ISBN 0-8014-9241-6.
  - Harris, William V (1975). American Journal of Philology. 96 (4): 433–436. doi:10.2307/294508. ISSN 0002-9475. JSTOR 294508.
  - Van't Dack, E (1977). Revue belge de Philologie et d'Histoire. 55 (2): 619–621.
  - Wiseman, T Peter (1973). Phoenix. 27 (2): 189–98. doi:10.2307/1087490. JSTOR 1087490.
- Badian, Ernst (2012). "publicani". Oxford Classical Dictionary (4th ed.). Oxford University Press. doi:10.1093/acrefore/9780199381135.013.5427. ISBN 978-0-19-954556-8.
- Davenport, Caillan (2019). A History of the Roman Equestrian Order. Cambridge: Cambridge University Press. ISBN 978-1-139-50640-3.
- Malmendier, Ulrike (2009). "Law and Finance "at the origin"". Journal of Economic Literature. 47 (4): 1076–1108. doi:10.1257/jel.47.4.1076. ISSN 0022-0515.
- McLeister, Kyle (2016). Publicani in the Principate (PDF) (PhD thesis). Hamilton, Ontario: McMaster University.
- Tan, James (2011). Competition between Public and Private Revenues in Roman Social and Political History (200–49 BC) (PDF) (PhD thesis). New York: Columbia University.
- Tan, James (2017). Power and Public Finance at Rome, 264–49 BCE. Oxford University Press. ISBN 978-0-19-063959-4.
