= Helladius of Auxerre =

Saint Helladius of Auxerre

Bishop of Auxerre
- Died: 387
- Honored in: Eastern Orthodox Church; Roman Catholic Church
- Feast: 8 May
- Patronage: Auxerre, France

Helladius of Auxerre (died 387) was the bishop of Auxerre for thirty years from 357 until his death. St. Amator (died 418) was converted to Christianity, ordained a deacon and tonsured by Helladius, which provides the earliest example of ecclesiastical tonsure mentioned in the religious history of France.

He is venerated as a saint in the Eastern Orthodox Church and Roman Catholic Church, being commemorated on 8 May.

== Sources ==
- Catholic Encyclopedia, s.v. Diocese of Sens
