= Zacchaeus =

Jewish Christian disciple

Saint Zacchaeus
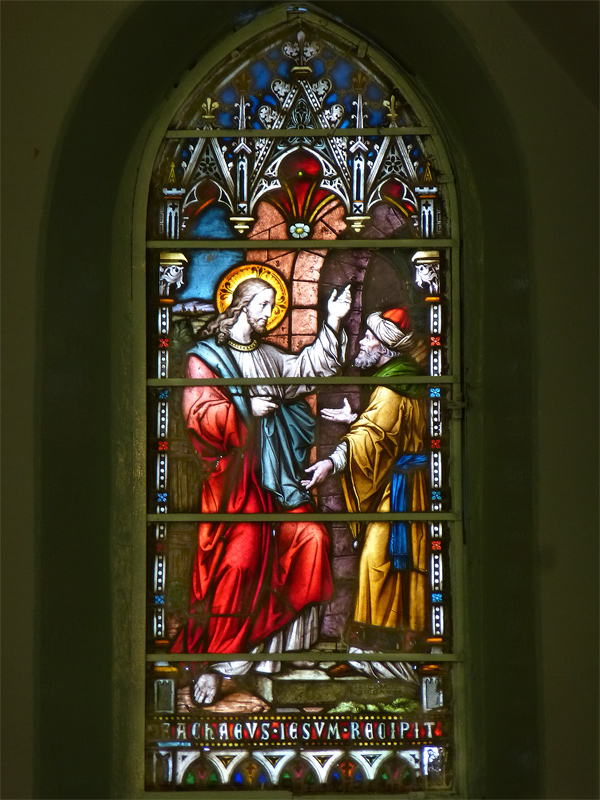
- Stained glass rendition of Zacchaeus receiving Jesus into his house. Church of the Good Shepherd, Jericho, Palestine.

Bishop of Caesarea
- Hometown: Jericho
- Residence: Caesarea
- Died: 1st or 2nd century Caesarea
- Venerated in: Catholic Church; Orthodox Church
- Canonized: Pre-Congregation
- Feast: 20 April
- Attributes: Bearded man holding a sycamore branch

Zacchaeus (sometimes spelled Zaccheus; Ancient Greek: Ζακχαῖος, Zakchaîos; Classical Syriac: ܙܰܟ݁ܰܝ, romanized: Zakay, "pure, innocent") was a man, recorded in the Gospel of Luke, a chief tax-collector at Jericho. His story includes his faith in climbing a sycamore tree to see Jesus and also his generosity in giving away half of all he possessed.

Tax collectors were despised as traitors (working for the Roman Empire, not for their Jewish community), and as being corrupt.

Because the lucrative production and export of balsam was centered in Jericho, such a position would have brought both importance and wealth. In the account, he arrived before the crowd who were later to meet with Jesus, who was passing through Jericho on his way to Jerusalem. He was short in stature and so was unable to see Jesus through the crowd (Luke 19:3). Zacchaeus then ran ahead and climbed a sycamore tree along Jesus's path. When Jesus reached the spot he looked up at the sycamore tree (actually a sycamore-fig Ficus sycomorus), addressed Zacchaeus by name, and told him to come down, for he intended to visit his house. The crowd was shocked that Jesus, a religious teacher and prophet, would sully himself by being a guest of a sinner.

== Later traditions ==
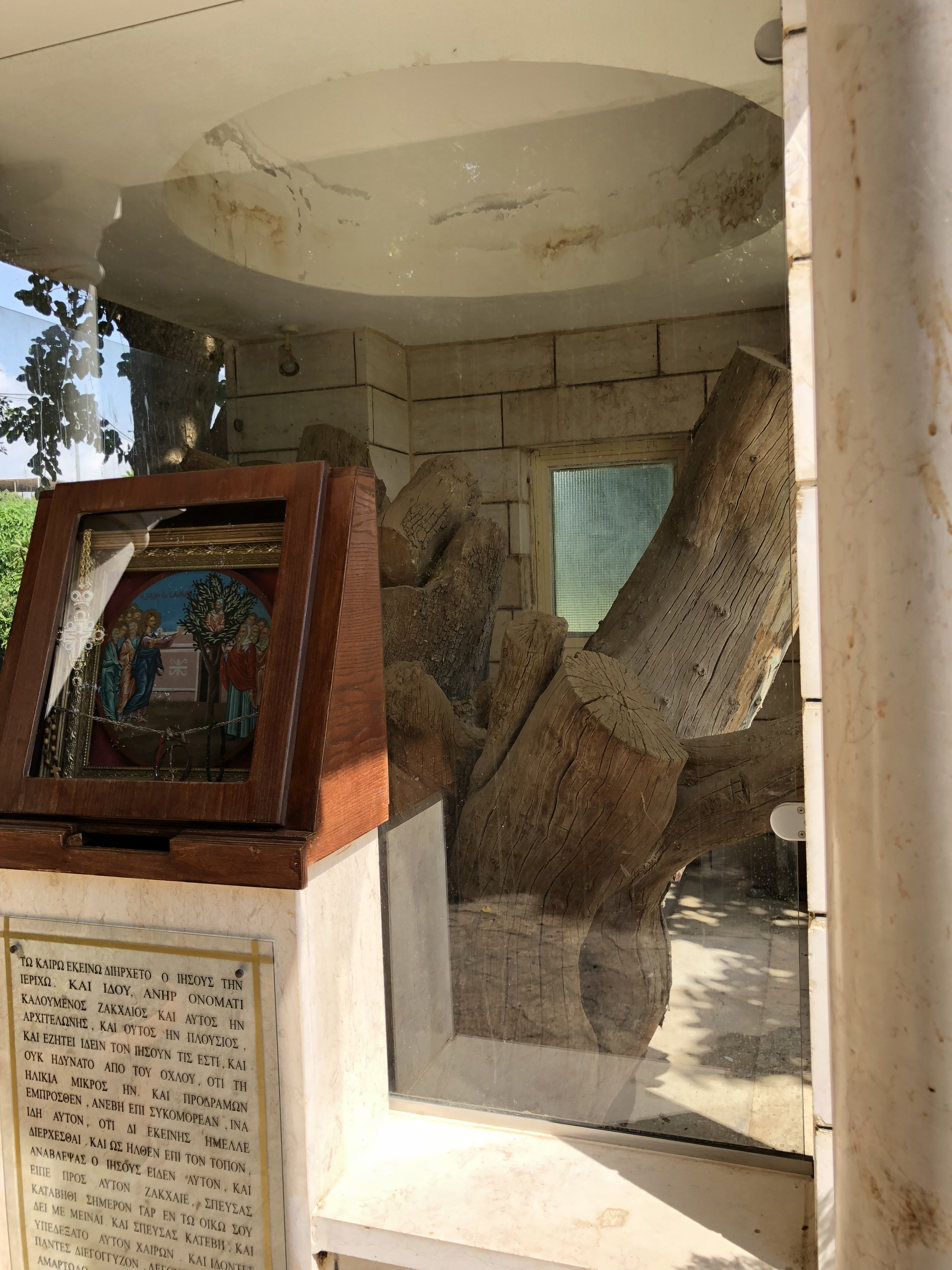
Sycamore of Zacchaeus, Greek Orthodox monastery of the prophet Elisha, Jericho, Palestine

At Er-riha (Jericho) there is a large, square tower, which by tradition is named the House of Zacchaeus.

Clement of Alexandria refers once to Zacchaeus in a way which could be read as suggesting that some identified him with apostle Matthew or Matthias. However, Luke indicates that Matthias was with Jesus in the beginning since the baptism of John (Acts 1:21–22). Because John preached the giving away of one's excess possessions in Luke 3:7–14, this could explain the generosity of Little Zacchaeus. John also told us that later, many of Jesus' disciples turned back and no longer followed him (John 6:60–66). The later Apostolic Constitutions identify "Zacchaeus the Publican" as the first bishop of Caesarea (7.46).

Medieval legend identified Zacchaeus with Saint Amadour, and held him to be the founder of the French sanctuary, Rocamadour.

== Liturgical practices ==
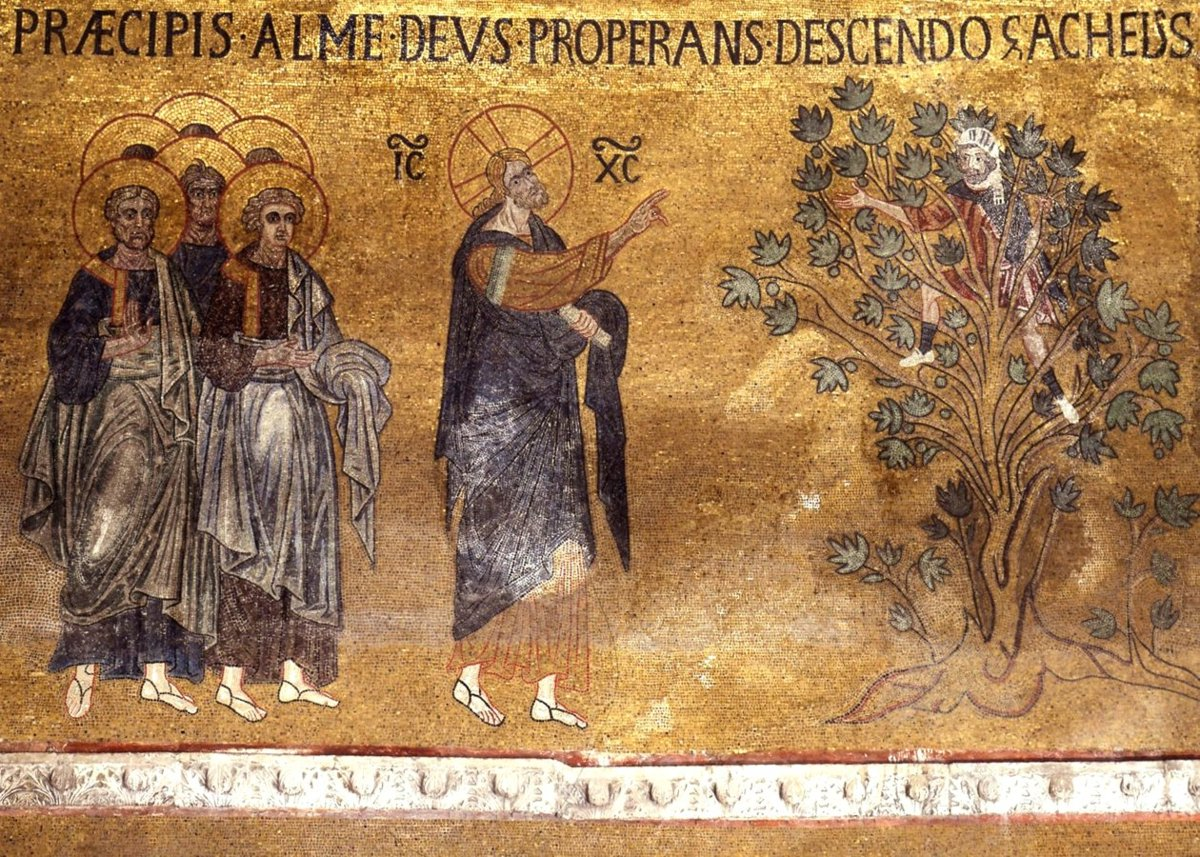
Jesus invites Zacchaeus to come down from the sycamore tree, 11th century Veneto-Byzantine mosaic from Saint Mark's Basilica

In Eastern Orthodox and Greek-Catholic Churches, the Gospel account of Zacchaeus is read on the penultimate Sunday of the Pre-Lenten Season preceding the start of Great Lent, for which reason that Sunday is known as "Zacchaeus Sunday". It is the first commemoration of a new Paschal cycle. The account was chosen to open the Lenten season because of two exegetical aspects: Jesus's call to Zacchaeus to come down from the tree (symbolizing the divine call to humility), and Zacchaeus's subsequent repentance. On years when Pascha, and hence Lent, falls very early the Sunday of the Canaanite woman is dropped and the Sunday of Zaccheaus falls immediately before Great Lent. However in some Eastern churches of the Greek tradition, Zacchaeus Sunday is instead dropped and does not form part of the Lental cycle for that year. In the Russian tradition, Zacchaeus Sunday always immediately precedes Great Lent having exchanged places with the Sunday of the Canaanite Woman.

In Western Christianity, the gospel pericope concerning Zacchaeus is the reading for a Dedication of a Church or its anniversary. In Southern Bavaria, a red banner with a white cross may be flown outside a Church on its anniversary, which is consequently called the Zacchaeus flag.

== See also ==
- Luke 19
- The naked fugitive
- Paschal cycle
- Zacchaeus (song)
- Zacchaeus of Jerusalem

| Preceded by none | Bishop of Caesarea ? | Succeeded by Cornelius (possibly Cornelius the Centurion) |
