= Thégra =

- Commune
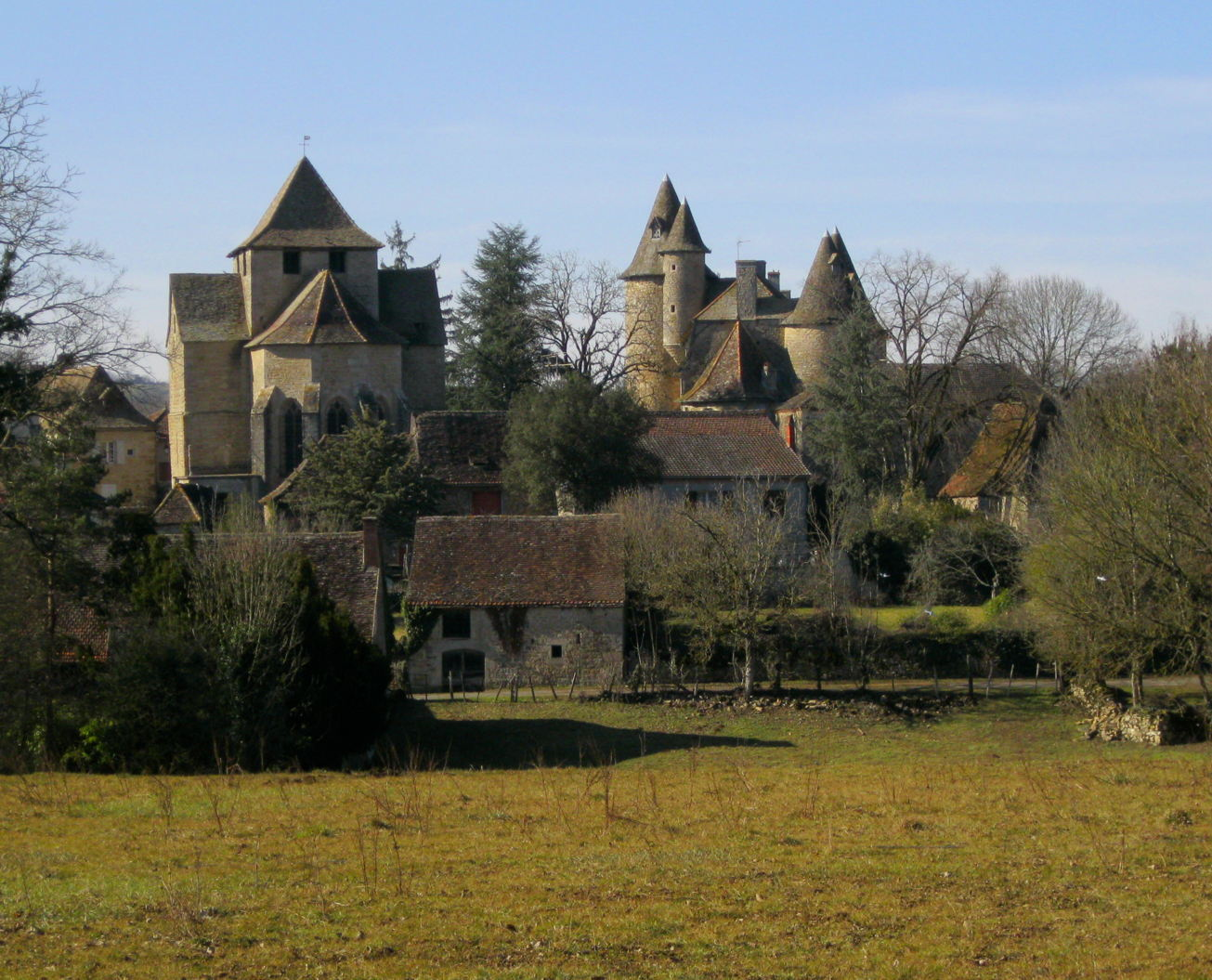
- The château and church in Thégra
- Location of Thégra
- Location within France Location within Occitanie
- Coordinates: 44°49′19″N 1°45′25″E
- Country: France
- Region: Occitania
- Department: Lot
- Arrondissement: Gourdon
- Canton: Gramat
- Intercommunality: Causses et Vallée de la Dordogne

Government
  - Mayor (2020–2026): Thierry Chartroux
- Area^{1}: 12.82 km^{2} (4.95 sq mi)
- Elevation: 354 m (1,161 ft)
- Highest elevation: 426 m (1,398 ft)
- Lowest elevation: 319 m (1,047 ft)
- Population (2023): 497
  - Density: 38.8/km^{2} (100/sq mi)
- Time zone: UTC+01:00 (CET)
  - Summer (DST): UTC+02:00 (CEST)
- INSEE/Postal code: 46317 /46500
- ^{1} French Land Register data, which excludes lakes, ponds, glaciers > 1 km^{2} (0.386 sq mi or 247 acres) and river estuaries.

Thégra (French pronunciation: [teɡʁa]; Occitan: Tegrà) is a commune in the Lot department in south-western France.

== See also ==
- Communes of the Lot department
