= Couzou =

- Commune
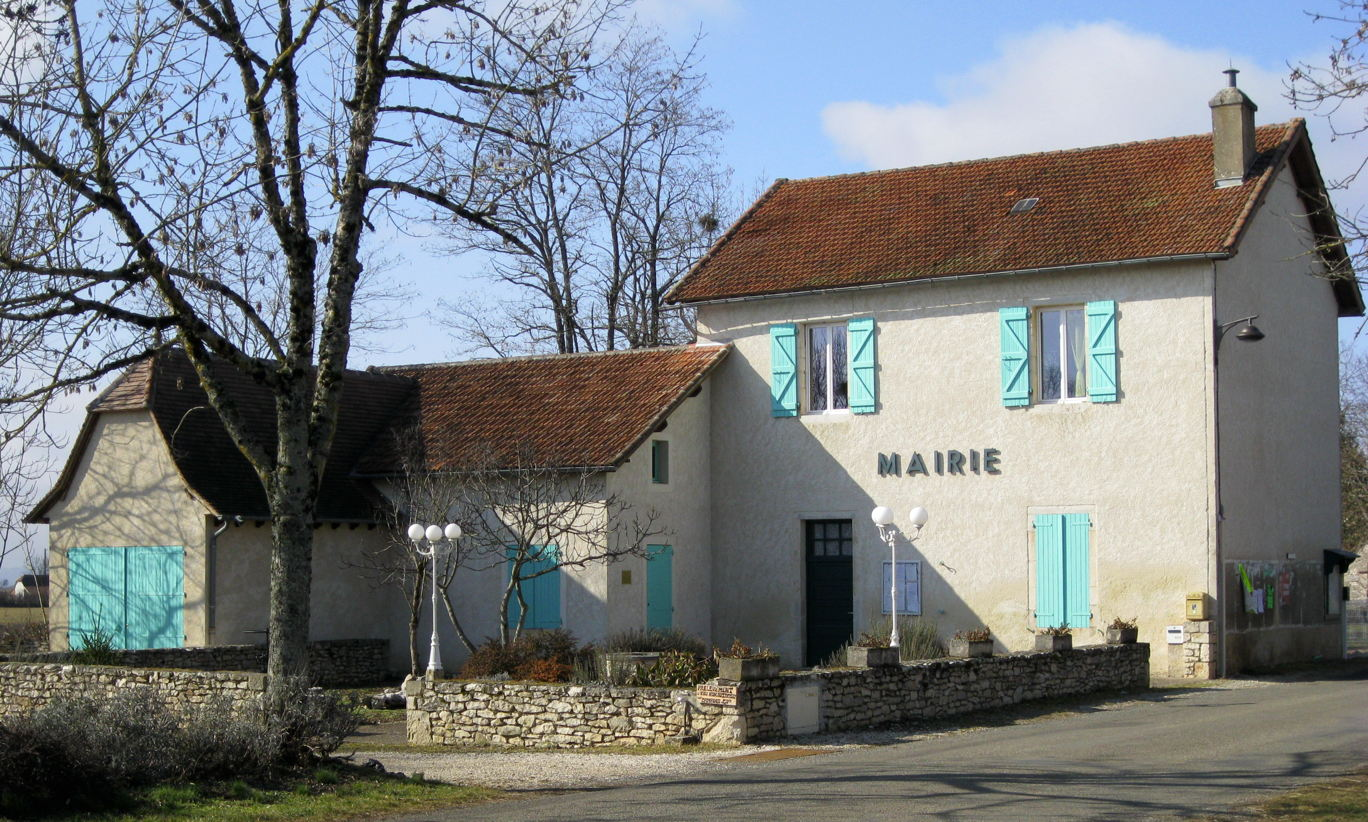
- The town hall in Couzou
- Location of Couzou
- Location within France Location within Occitanie
- Coordinates: 44°46′00″N 1°37′02″E
- Country: France
- Region: Occitania
- Department: Lot
- Arrondissement: Gourdon
- Canton: Gramat
- Intercommunality: Causses et Vallée de la Dordogne

Government
  - Mayor (2020–2026): Laurent Clavel
- Area^{1}: 21.72 km^{2} (8.39 sq mi)
- Elevation: 300 m (980 ft)
- Highest elevation: 376 m (1,234 ft)
- Lowest elevation: 138 m (453 ft)
- Population (2023): 95
  - Density: 4.4/km^{2} (11/sq mi)
- Time zone: UTC+01:00 (CET)
  - Summer (DST): UTC+02:00 (CEST)
- INSEE/Postal code: 46078 /46500
- ^{1} French Land Register data, which excludes lakes, ponds, glaciers > 1 km^{2} (0.386 sq mi or 247 acres) and river estuaries.

Couzou (French pronunciation: [kuzu]; Languedocien: Coson) is a commune in the Lot department in south-western France.

== See also ==
- Communes of the Lot department
