= Parfondeval, Aisne =

Parfondeval
- Commune
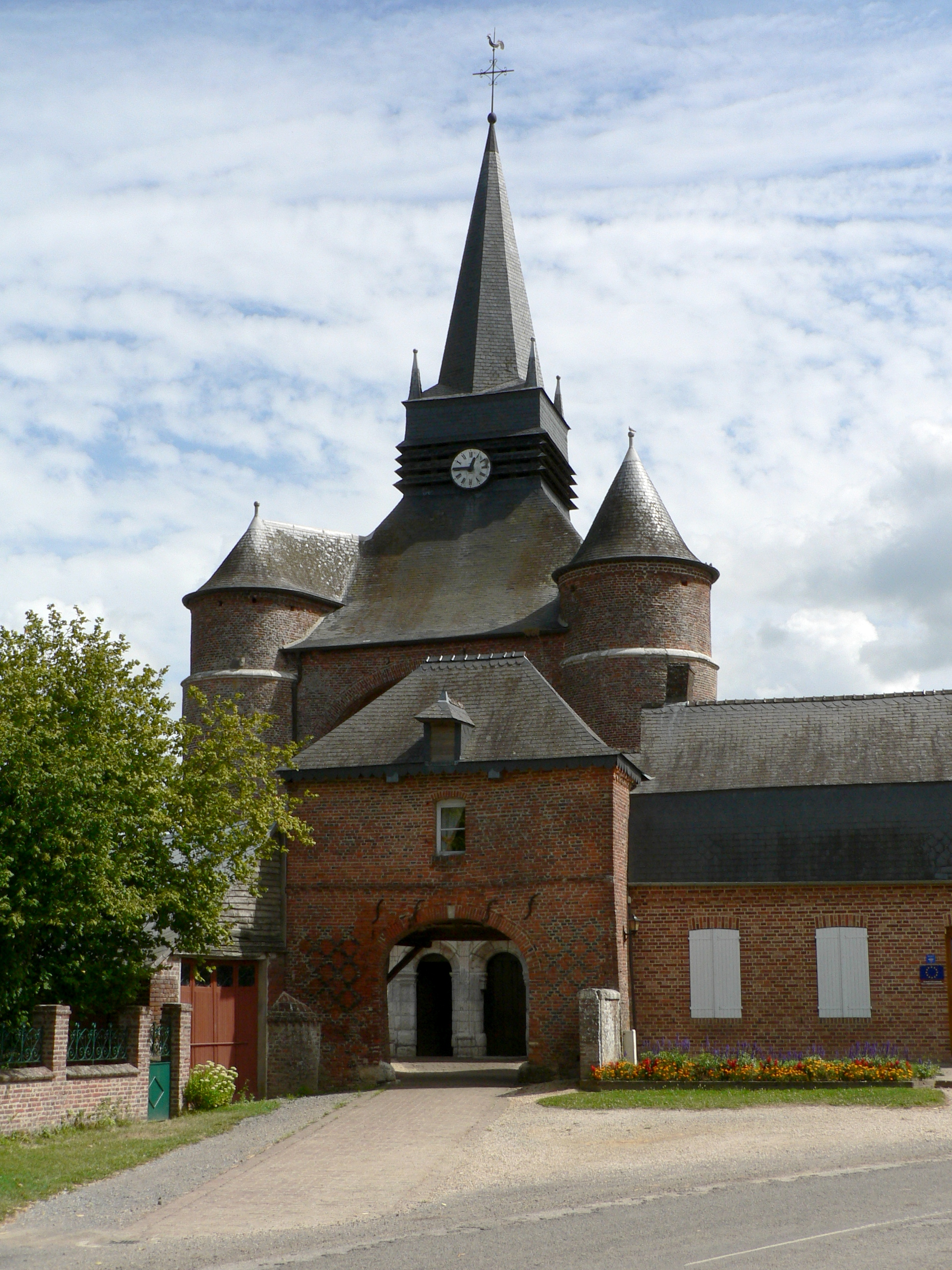
- The church of Parfondeval
- Location of Parfondeval
- Location within France Location within Hauts-de-France
- Coordinates: 49°44′30″N 4°09′38″E
- Country: France
- Region: Hauts-de-France
- Department: Aisne
- Arrondissement: Vervins
- Canton: Vervins
- Intercommunality: Portes de la Thiérache

Government
  - Mayor (2026–32): Sébastien Cury
- Area^{1}: 10.91 km^{2} (4.21 sq mi)
- Elevation: 211 m (692 ft)
- Highest elevation: 248 m (814 ft)
- Lowest elevation: 159 m (522 ft)
- Population (2023): 143
  - Density: 13.1/km^{2} (33.9/sq mi)
- Time zone: UTC+01:00 (CET)
  - Summer (DST): UTC+02:00 (CEST)
- INSEE/Postal code: 02586 /02360
- ^{1} French Land Register data, which excludes lakes, ponds, glaciers > 1 km^{2} (0.386 sq mi or 247 acres) and river estuaries.

Parfondeval (French pronunciation: [paʁfɔ̃dval]) is a commune in the Aisne department in Hauts-de-France in northern France. It is a member of Les Plus Beaux Villages de France (The Most Beautiful Villages of France) Association.

== Population ==
Historical population
Year	Pop.	±% p.a.
1968	226	—
1975	212	−0.91%
1982	193	−1.33%
1990	177	−1.08%
1999	149	−1.90%
2007	163	+1.13%
2012	145	−2.31%
2017	142	−0.42%
2023	143	+0.12%
Source: INSEE

== See also ==
- Communes of the Aisne department
