= Gargilesse-Dampierre =

- Commune
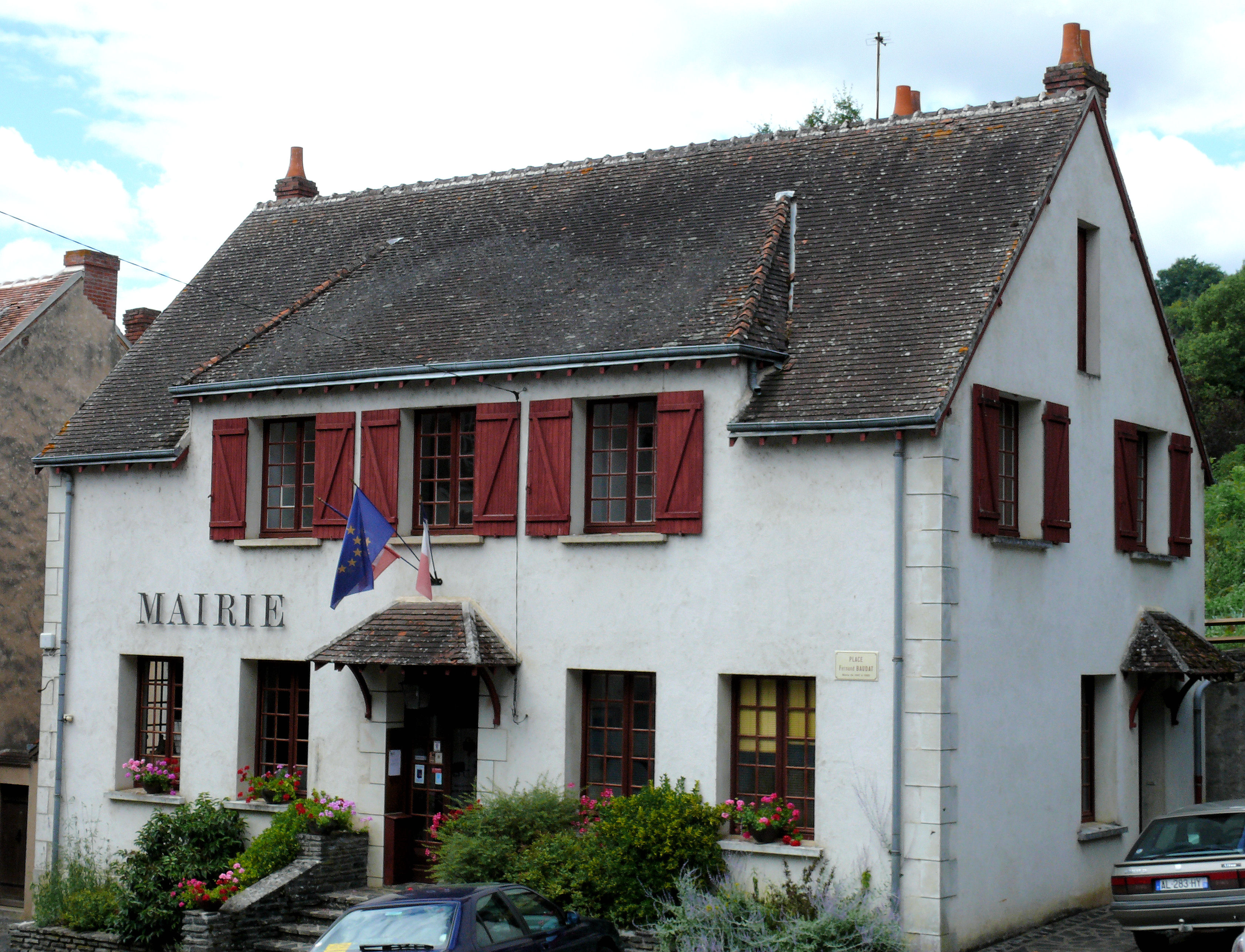
- The town hall in Gargilesse
- Location of Gargilesse-Dampierre
- Location within France Location within Centre-Val de Loire
- Coordinates: 46°30′52″N 1°35′52″E
- Country: France
- Region: Centre-Val de Loire
- Department: Indre
- Arrondissement: Châteauroux
- Canton: Argenton-sur-Creuse

Government
  - Mayor (2021–2026): Martine Sabroux-Idoux
- Area^{1}: 15.72 km^{2} (6.07 sq mi)
- Elevation: 221 m (725 ft)
- Highest elevation: 275 m (902 ft)
- Lowest elevation: 124 m (407 ft)
- Population (2023): 262
  - Density: 16.7/km^{2} (43.2/sq mi)
- Time zone: UTC+01:00 (CET)
  - Summer (DST): UTC+02:00 (CEST)
- INSEE/Postal code: 36081 /36190
- ^{1} French Land Register data, which excludes lakes, ponds, glaciers > 1 km^{2} (0.386 sq mi or 247 acres) and river estuaries.

Gargilesse-Dampierre (French pronunciation: [ɡaʁʒilɛs dɑ̃pjɛʁ]) is a commune in the Indre department in central France.

It is a member of Les Plus Beaux Villages de France (The Most Beautiful Villages of France) Association and is situated near the confluence of the Gargilesse stream and the river Creuse. The 19th century writer George Sand lived in the village.

== Population ==
Historical population
Year	Pop.	±% p.a.
1968	400	—
1975	363	−1.38%
1982	347	−0.64%
1990	342	−0.18%
1999	324	−0.60%
2007	325	+0.04%
2012	304	−1.33%
2017	285	−1.28%
2023	262	−1.39%
Source: INSEE

== See also ==
- Communes of the Indre department
