= Les Plus Beaux Villages de France =

Association of the most beautiful villages in France

Logo

Les Plus Beaux Villages de France (French pronunciation: [le ply bo vilaʒ də fʁɑ̃s] 'the most beautiful villages of France') is an independent association created in 1982 for the promotion of the tourist appeal of small rural villages with a rich cultural heritage. As of 2024, it numbers 176 member villages (independent communes or part of a communauté de communes). It is affiliated to the international association The Most Beautiful Villages in the World.

Membership requires meeting certain selection criteria and offers a strategy for development and promotion to tourists. The three initial selection criteria are the rural nature of the village (a population of fewer than 2,000 inhabitants), the presence of at least two national heritage sites (sites classés or monuments historiques) and local support in the form of a vote by the council. Each village must pay an annual fee to the association and the mayor must sign the association's Quality Charter. If the village fails to meet the requirements of the charter it may be excluded.

The association claims membership can bring a rise of between 10 and 50% in visitor numbers.

The southern departments of the Dordogne and Aveyron have the most number of member villages, with ten in each. They are followed by Lot, with eight, and Vaucluse, with seven.

Following the success of the French certification, similar associations have been formed in Wallonia (Les Plus Beaux Villages de Wallonie), Quebec (Les Plus Beaux Villages du Québec), Italy (I Borghi più belli d'Italia), Japan (日本で最も美しい村」連合 Nihon de mottomo utsukushii mura rengō), Spain (Los pueblos más bonitos de España), Russia (Самые красивые деревни России), and Switzerland and Liechtenstein (Les plus beaux villages de Suisse).

== History ==
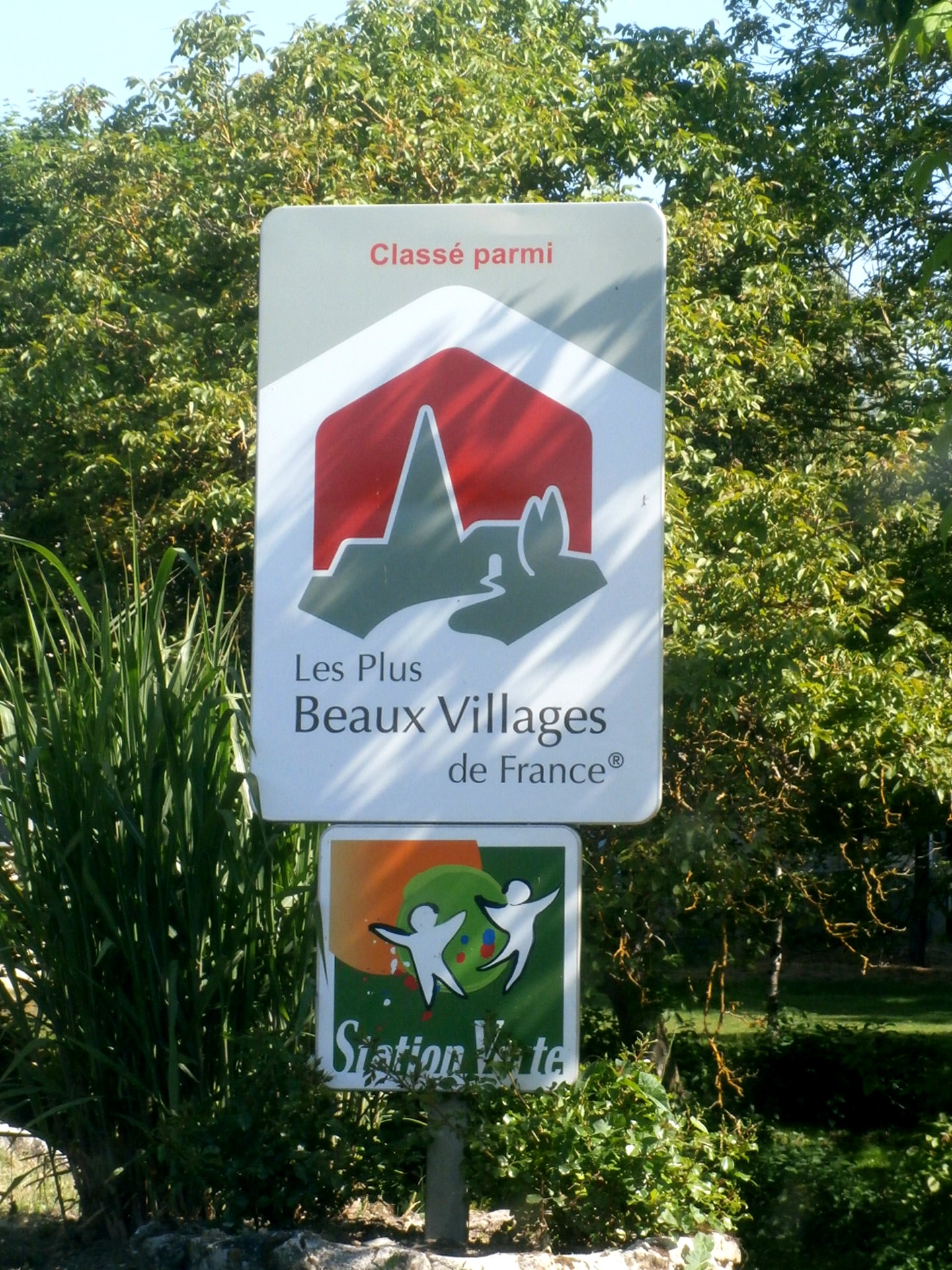
Road sign in Montrésor

The idea of an association to gather the most beautiful villages of France was born in Collonges-la-Rouge, Corrèze in 1981. Charles Ceyrac, mayor of the village, was inspired by a Reader's Digest book entitled Les Plus Beaux Villages de France which included pictures of Collonges. He decided to launch an association that would unite villages to give them a public face and revitalise their economies. He wrote to the mayors of one hundred villages included in the book, advising them of his plans. Sixty-six mayors responded and the association was officially founded on 6 March 1982 at Salers, Cantal.

Charles Ceyrac remained the president of the association until 1996, when he was succeeded by Maurice Chabert, mayor of Gordes, Vaucluse, the current president. The association is still situated in Collonges-la-Rouge.

The association and its certification have been very successful. Many competing certifications exist in France, differentiated by their targets (e.g. level of population), stringency of criteria and cost of membership.

The association has four employees and an annual budget of €479,000. An application, as well as each six-yearly review, requires evaluation by the Quality Committee at the cost of €800 plus €0.50 per inhabitant. Each member village contributes an annual fee of €3 per inhabitant.

Since 2000, the president of the association has had a seat on the Conseil national du tourisme (National Tourist Board).

Since 7 July 2012, Les Plus Beaux Villages de France has been part of the international association Les Plus Beaux Villages de la Terre ("The Most Beautiful Villages of the World").

== Principles ==
The association was set up to help villages promoting their touristic potentials. It specifically targets villages that are sometimes neglected by wider regional or national touristic strategies. The association believes in improving life in French countryside and it places an emphasis on bringing back economical activities to villages. Most of the labelled villages are in regions that greatly suffer from rural flight. Many villages can be considered dead when most of their houses are either in ruins or transformed into holiday properties by foreigners or French people living in other regions. The association does not promote or encourage open-air museums and other museum-villages.

One of the major principles of the association is the protection of the historical and cultural heritage. Labelled villages must show a real strategy to preserve and promote their heritage. The association encourages environmentally friendly tourism, for instance by encouraging tailor-made breaks rather than mere passing trade.

== Criteria ==
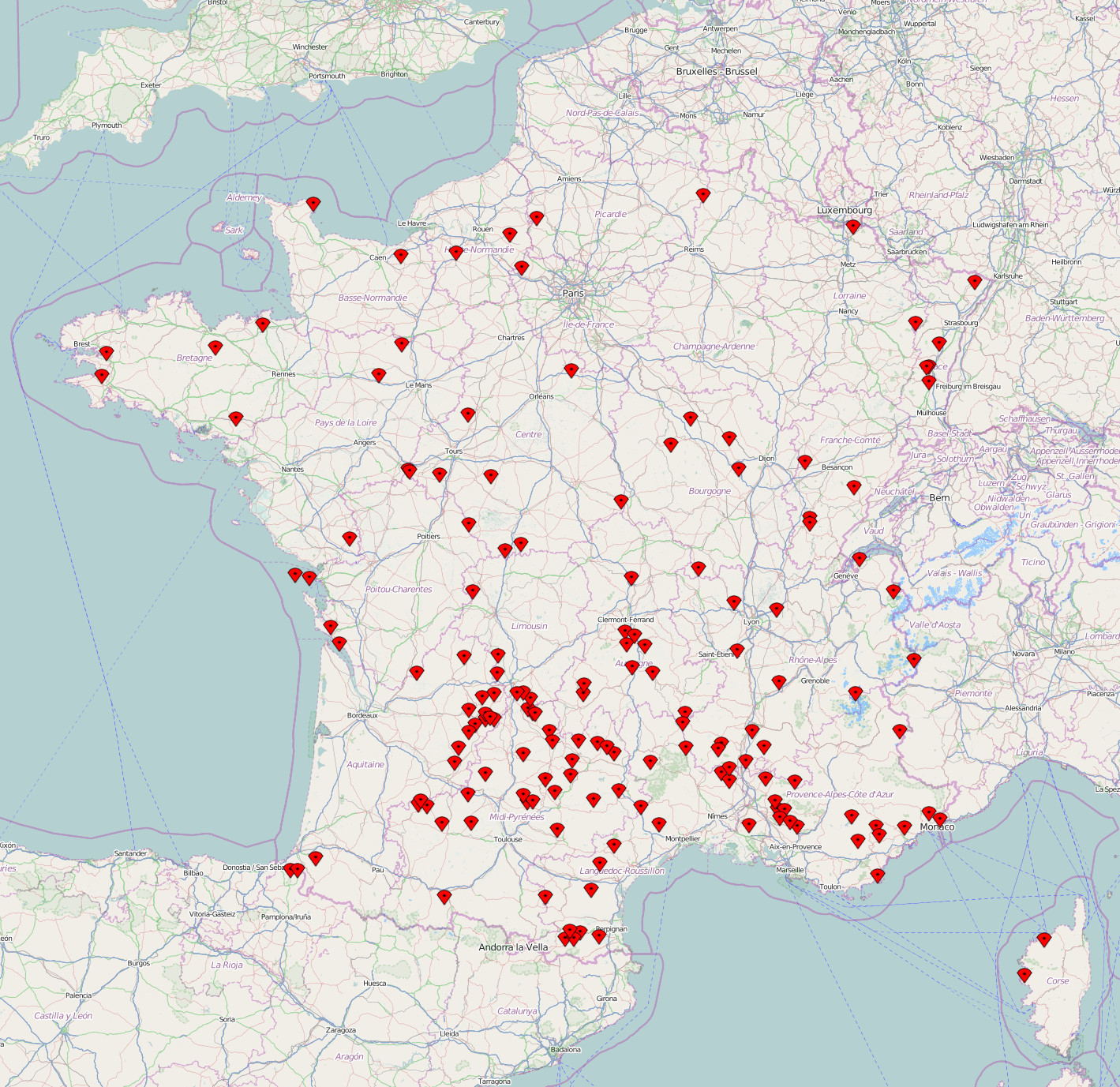
The labelled villages in 2014

The association asks candidate municipalities to fill out an application form for the village or hamlet they wish to see receive the label. The locality must have a rural character with no more than 2,000 inhabitants and it must include two national heritage sites and their protection perimeter. The municipality must show real interest and the local council must have deliberated on the application.

After the form is returned to the association, it sends experts to evaluate the application. They create a record of pictures and documents about the locality and consider its appearance (architecture, urbanism, facilities for welcoming tourists, environment quality). The dossier is then given to a commission who decides if the village receives the label or not. If it is successful, the municipality must sign a quality charter.

== List ==
=== Auvergne-Rhône-Alpes ===
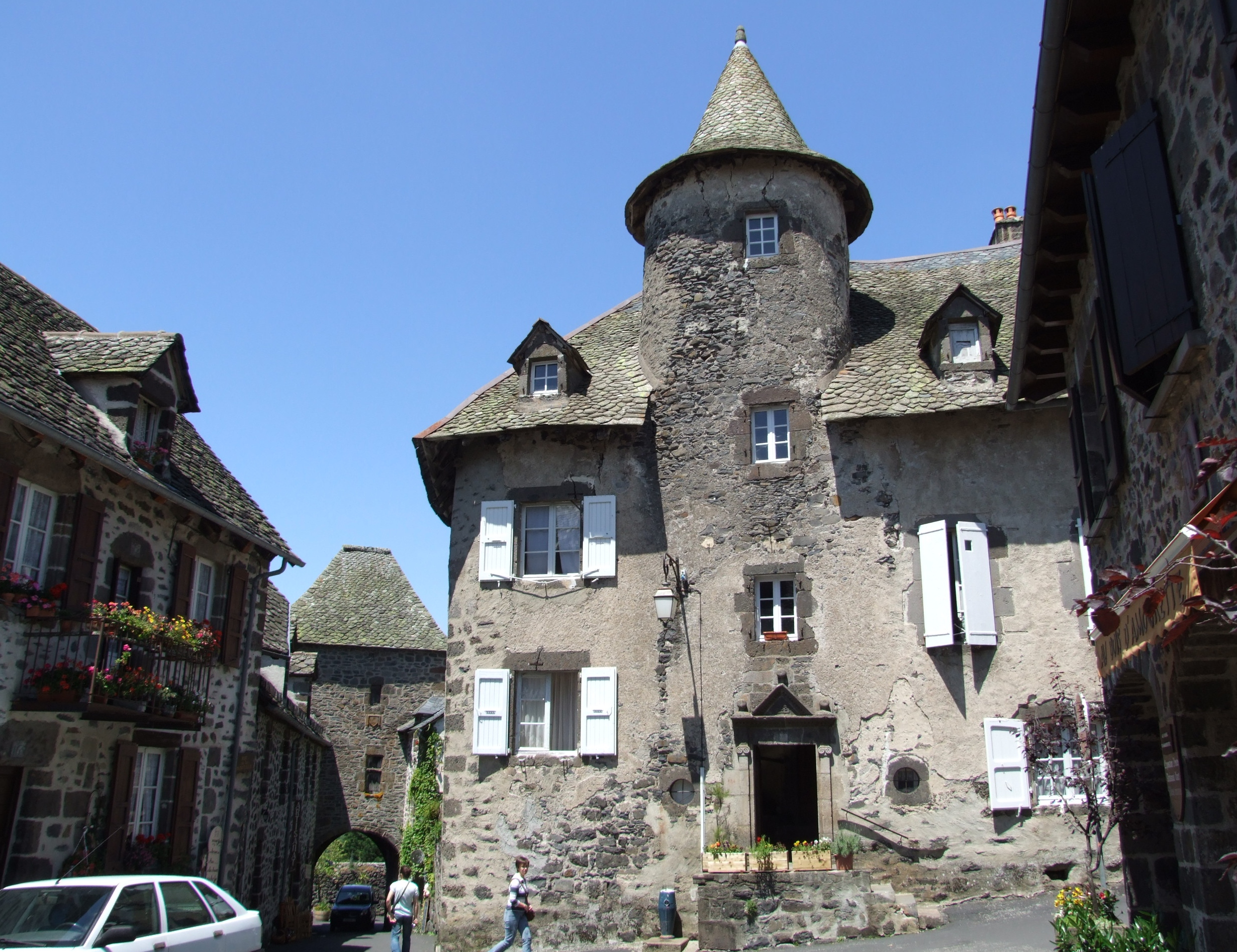
Salers in Auvergne

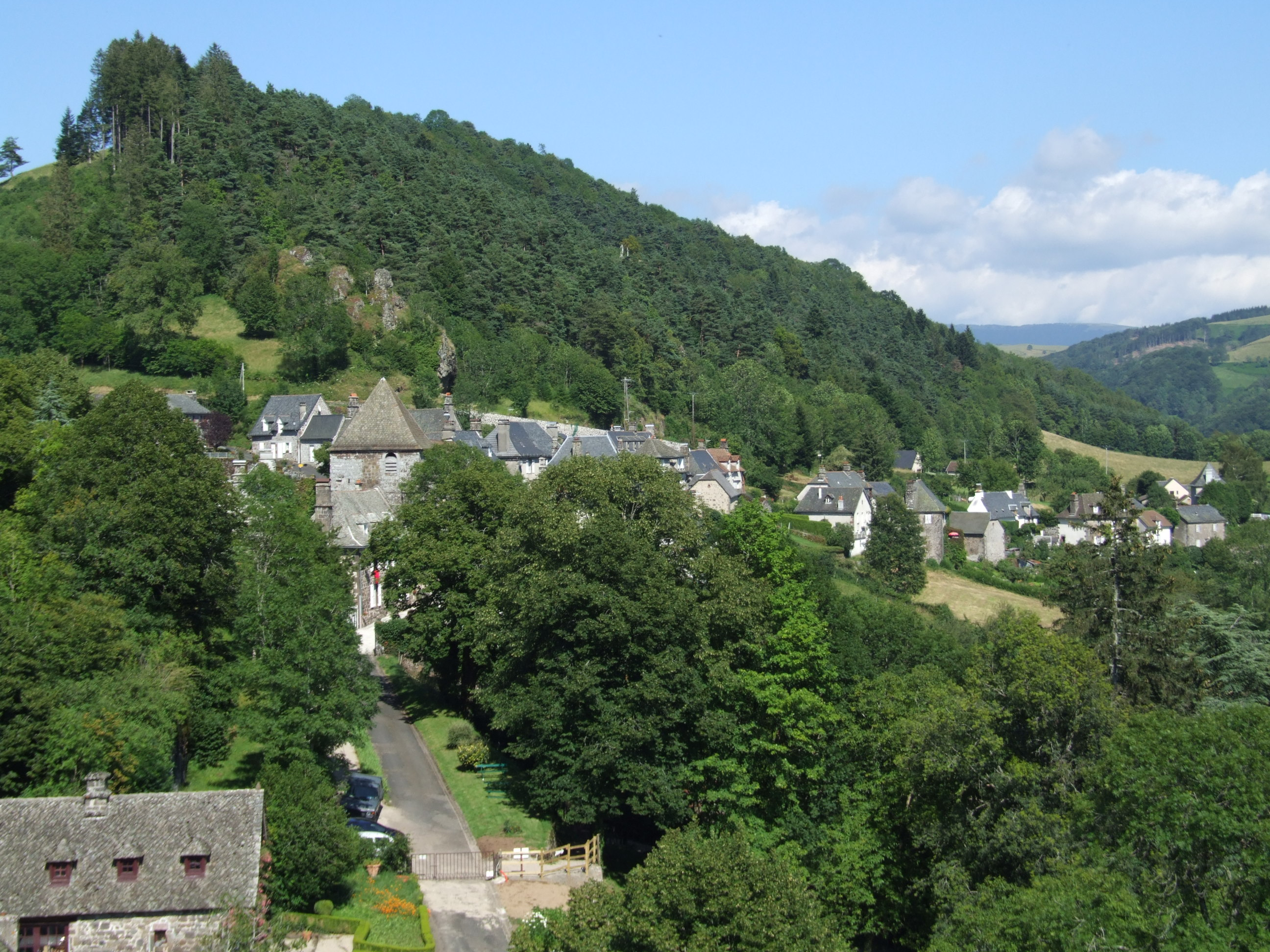
Tournemire, Cantal

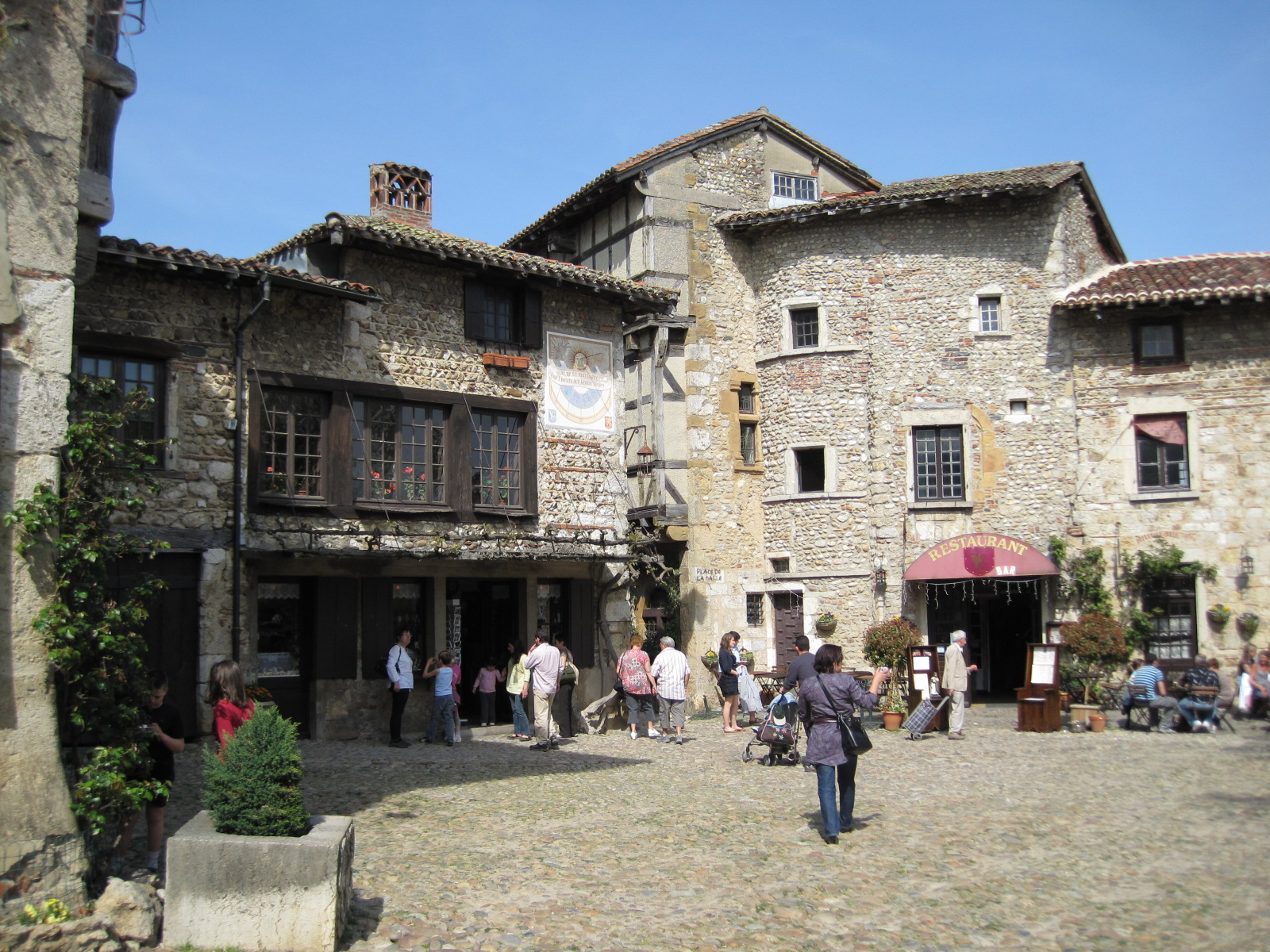
Pérouges

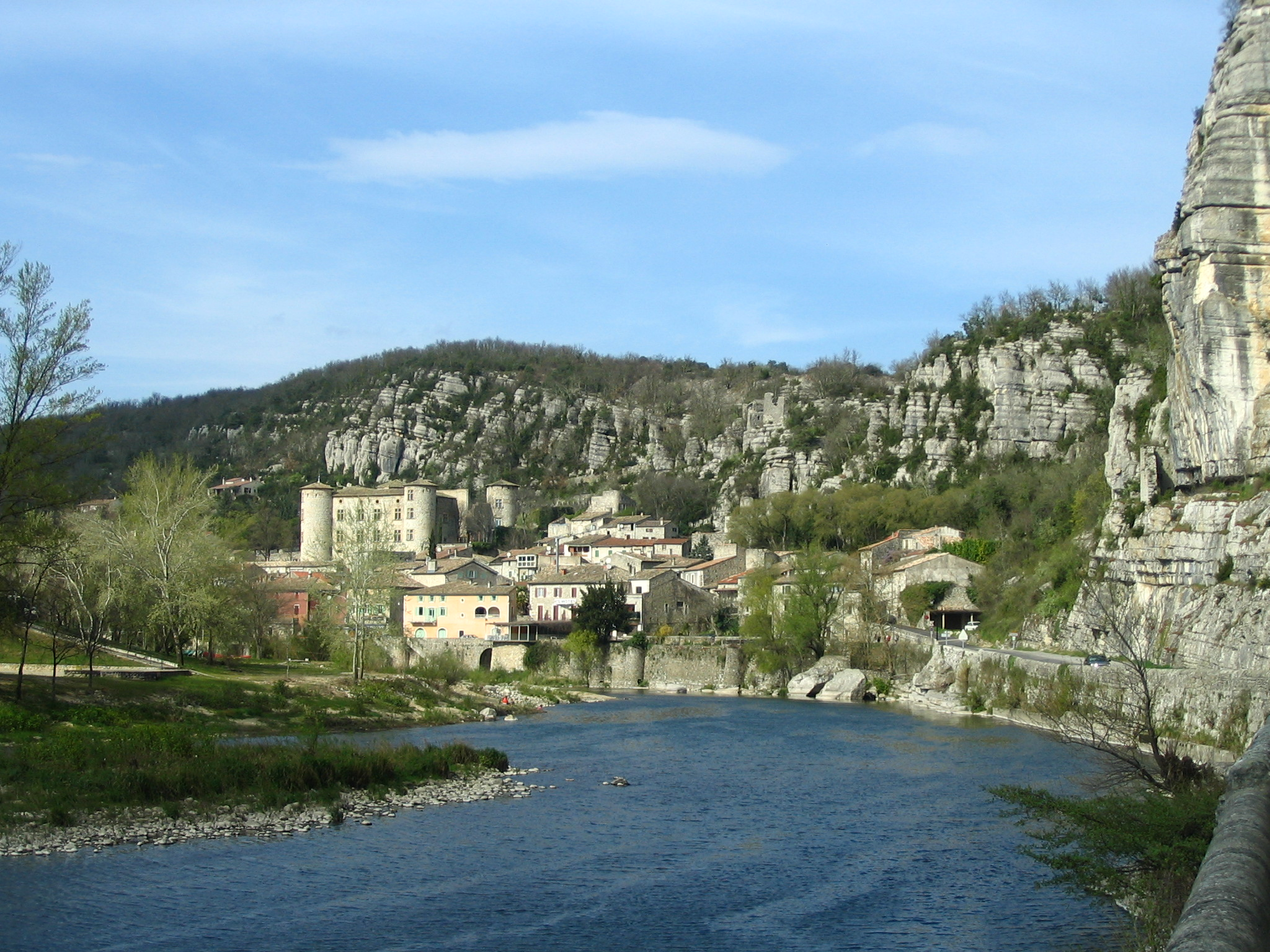
Vogüé and the Ardèche river

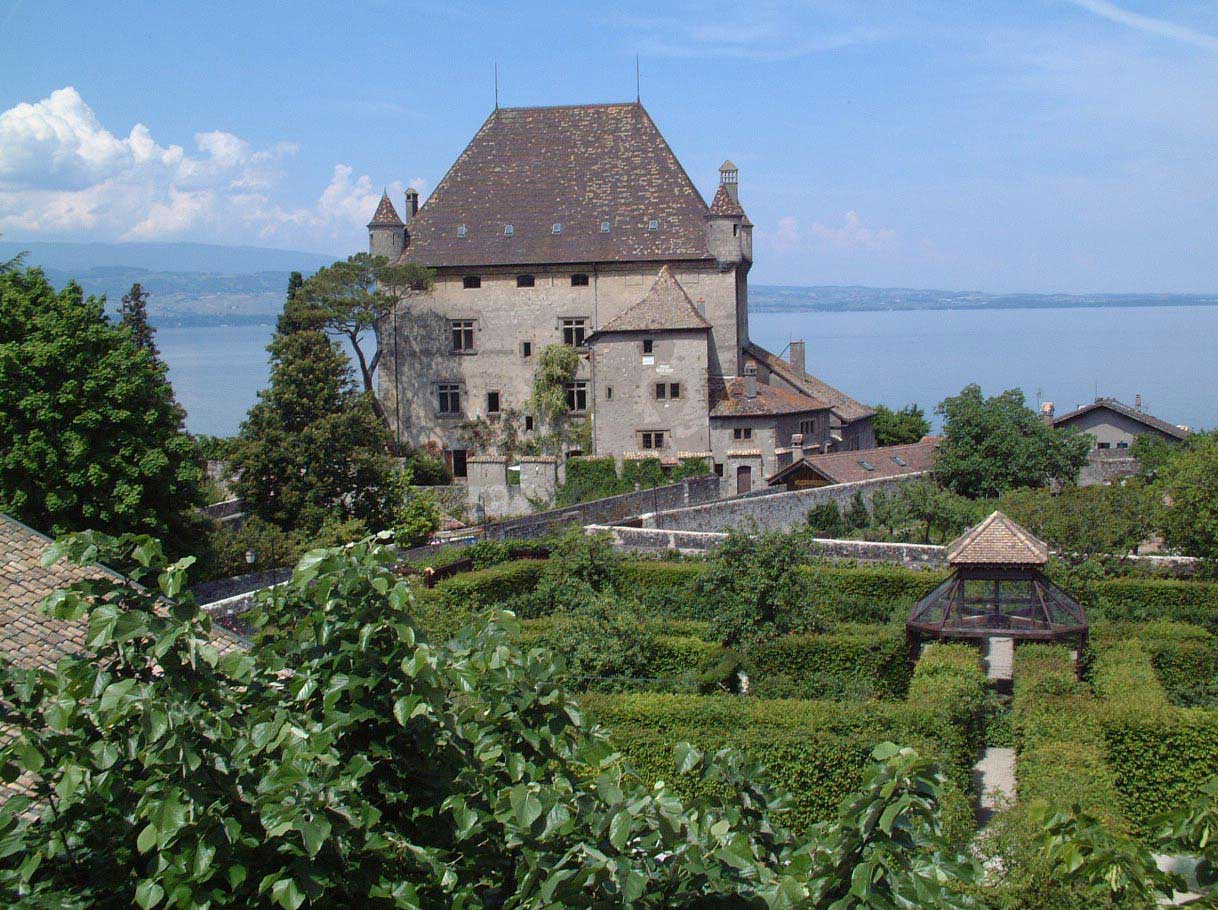
Yvoire and Lake Léman

- Ain
  - Pérouges
- Allier
  - Charroux
- Ardèche
  - Balazuc
  - Vogüé
- Cantal
  - Marcolès
  - Salers
  - Tournemire
- Drôme
  - Châtillon-en-Diois
  - Grignan
  - La Garde-Adhémar
  - Mirmande
  - Montbrun-les-Bains
  - Le Poët-Laval
- Haute-Loire
  - Arlempdes
  - Blesle
  - Lavaudieu
  - Lavoûte-Chilhac
  - Polignac
  - Pradelles
- Haute-Savoie
  - Yvoire
- Isère
  - Saint-Antoine-l'Abbaye
- Loire
  - Sainte-Croix-en-Jarez
- Puy-de-Dôme
  - Montpeyroux
  - Usson
- Rhône
  - Oingt
- Savoie
  - Bonneval-sur-Arc

=== Bourgogne-Franche-Comté ===
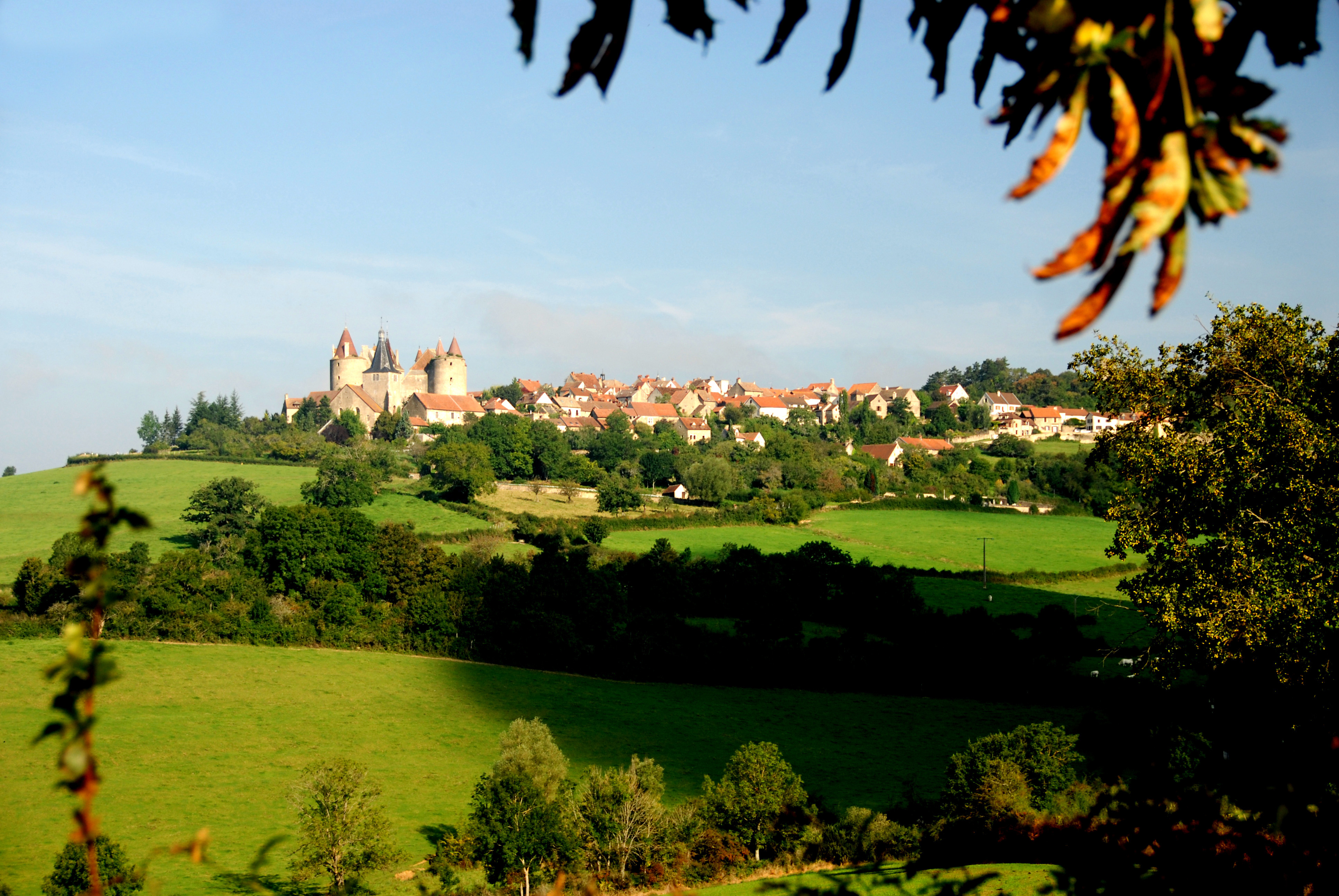
Châteauneuf, Côte-d'Or

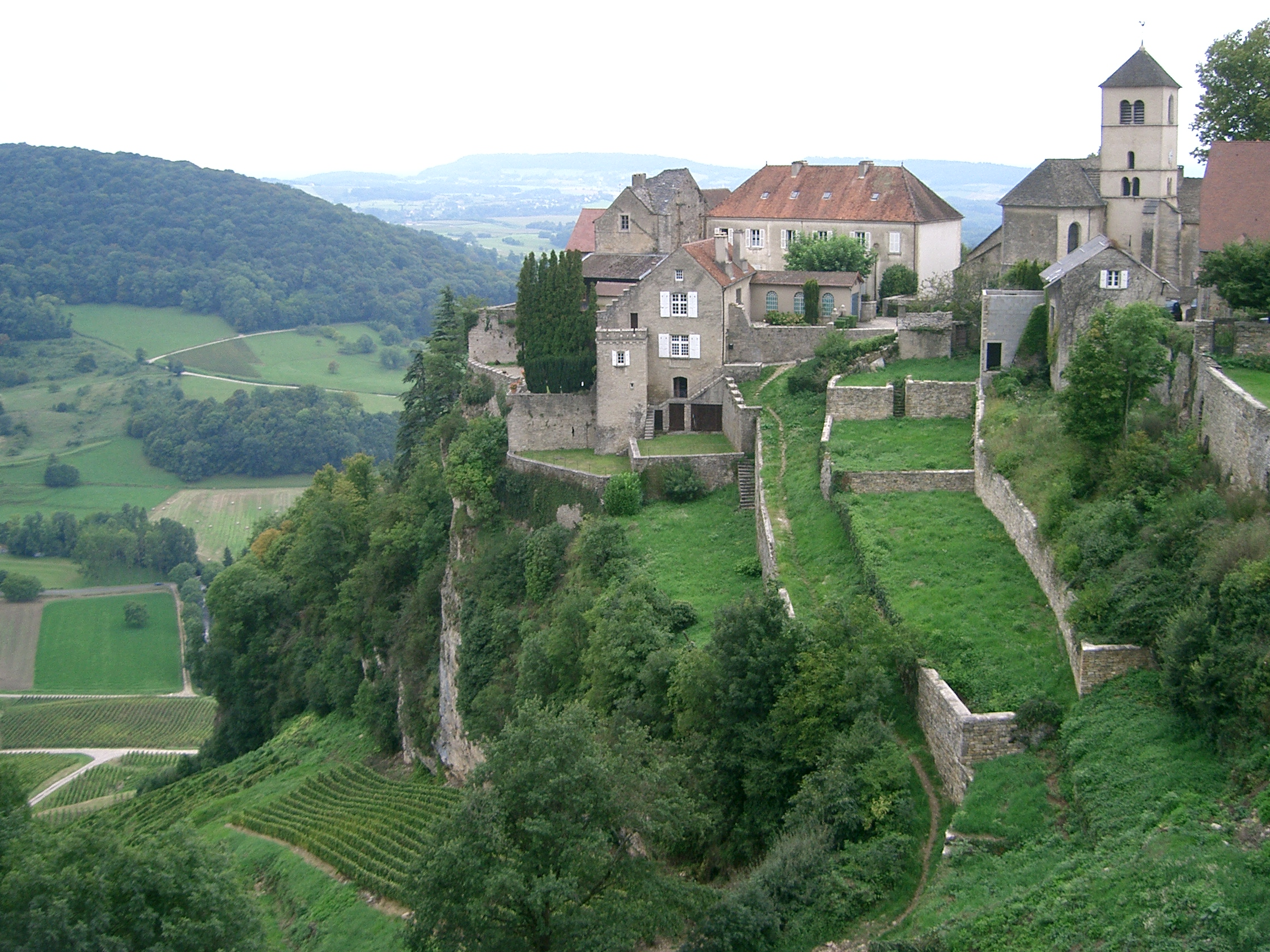
Château-Chalon in Franche-Comté

- Côte-d'Or
  - Châteauneuf
  - Flavigny-sur-Ozerain
- Doubs
  - Lods
- Haute-Saône
  - Pesmes
- Jura
  - Baume-les-Messieurs
  - Château-Chalon
- Saône-et-Loire
  - Semur-en-Brionnais
- Yonne
  - Noyers
  - Vézelay

=== Brittany ===
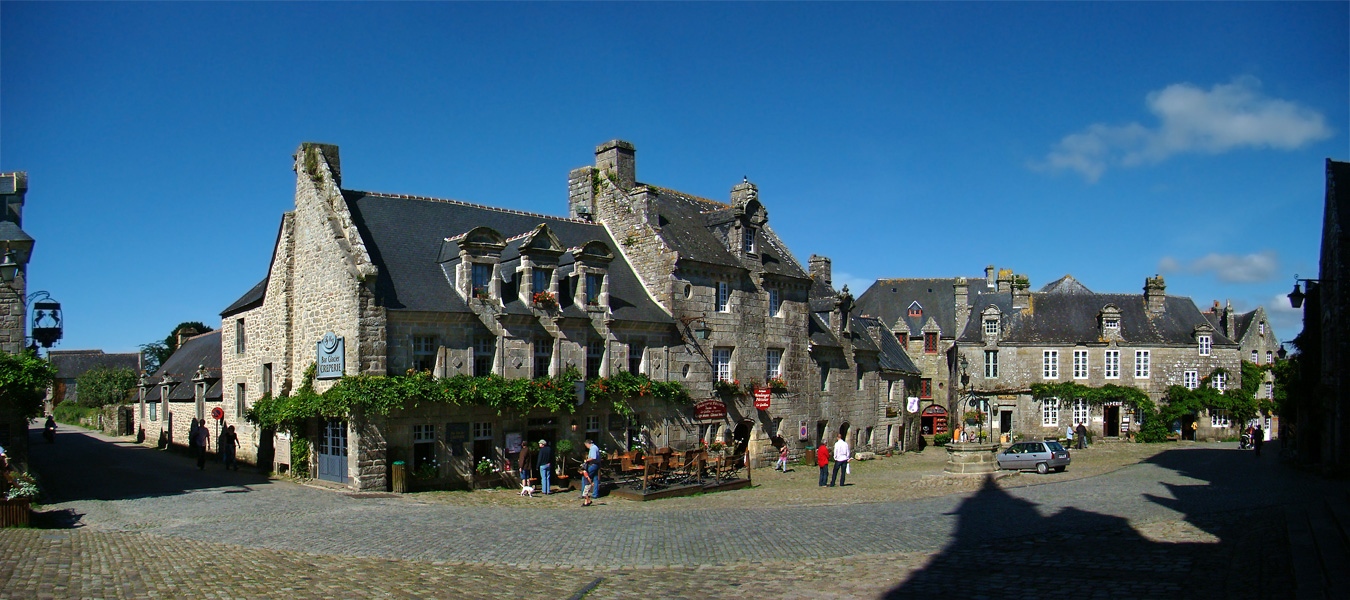
Locronan in Finistère

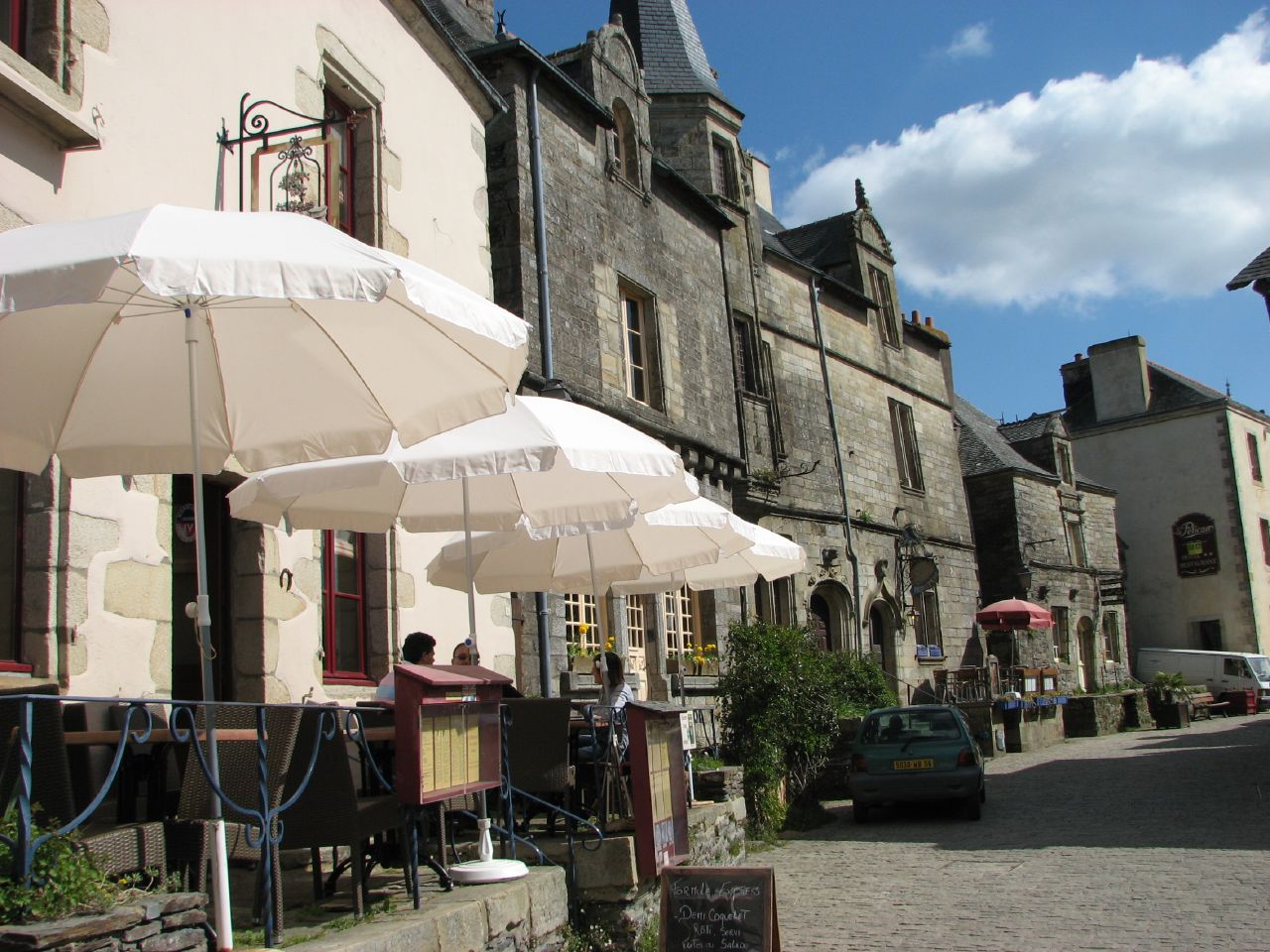
Rochefort-en-Terre

- Côtes d'Armor
  - Moncontour
- Finistère
  - Locronan
- Ille-et-Vilaine
  - Saint-Suliac
- Morbihan
  - Rochefort-en-Terre

=== Centre-Val de Loire ===
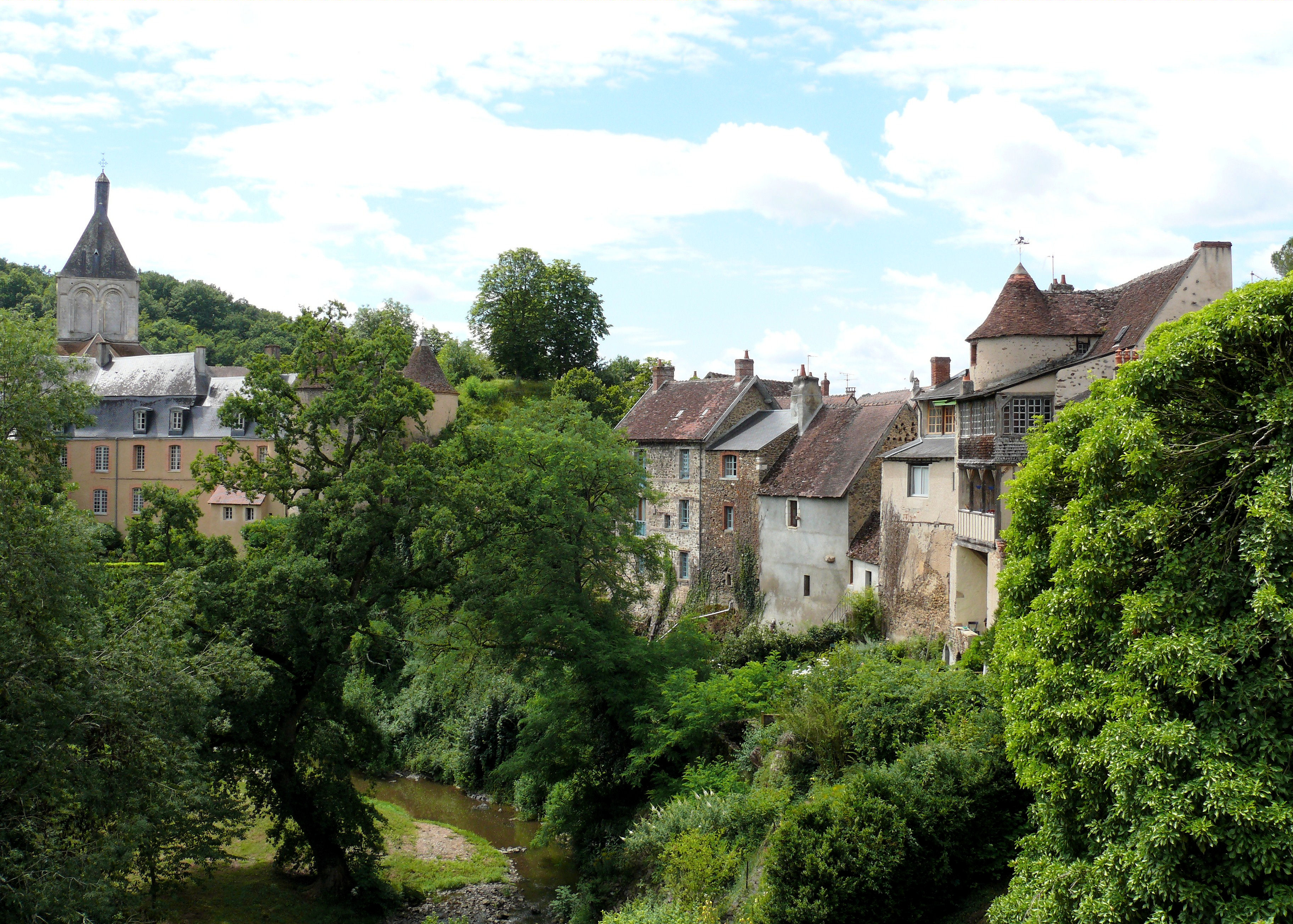
Gargilesse-Dampierre in Berry

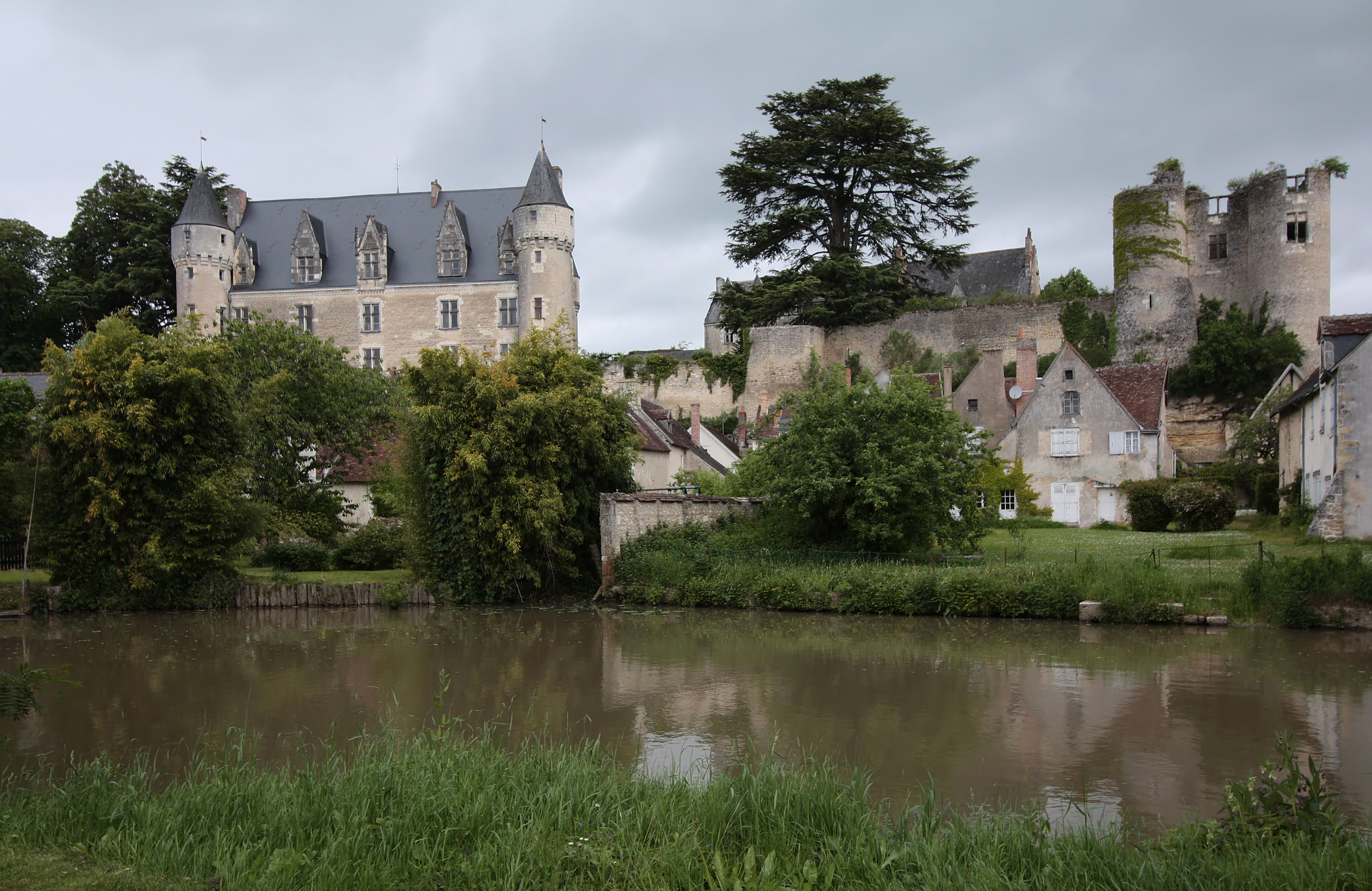
Montrésor

- Cher
  - Apremont-sur-Allier
  - Sancerre
- Indre
  - Gargilesse-Dampierre
  - Saint-Benoît-du-Sault
- Indre-et-Loire
  - Candes-Saint-Martin
  - Crissay-sur-Manse
  - Montrésor
- Loir-et-Cher
  - Lavardin
- Loiret
  - Yèvre-le-Châtel (in Yèvre-la-Ville)

=== Corsica ===
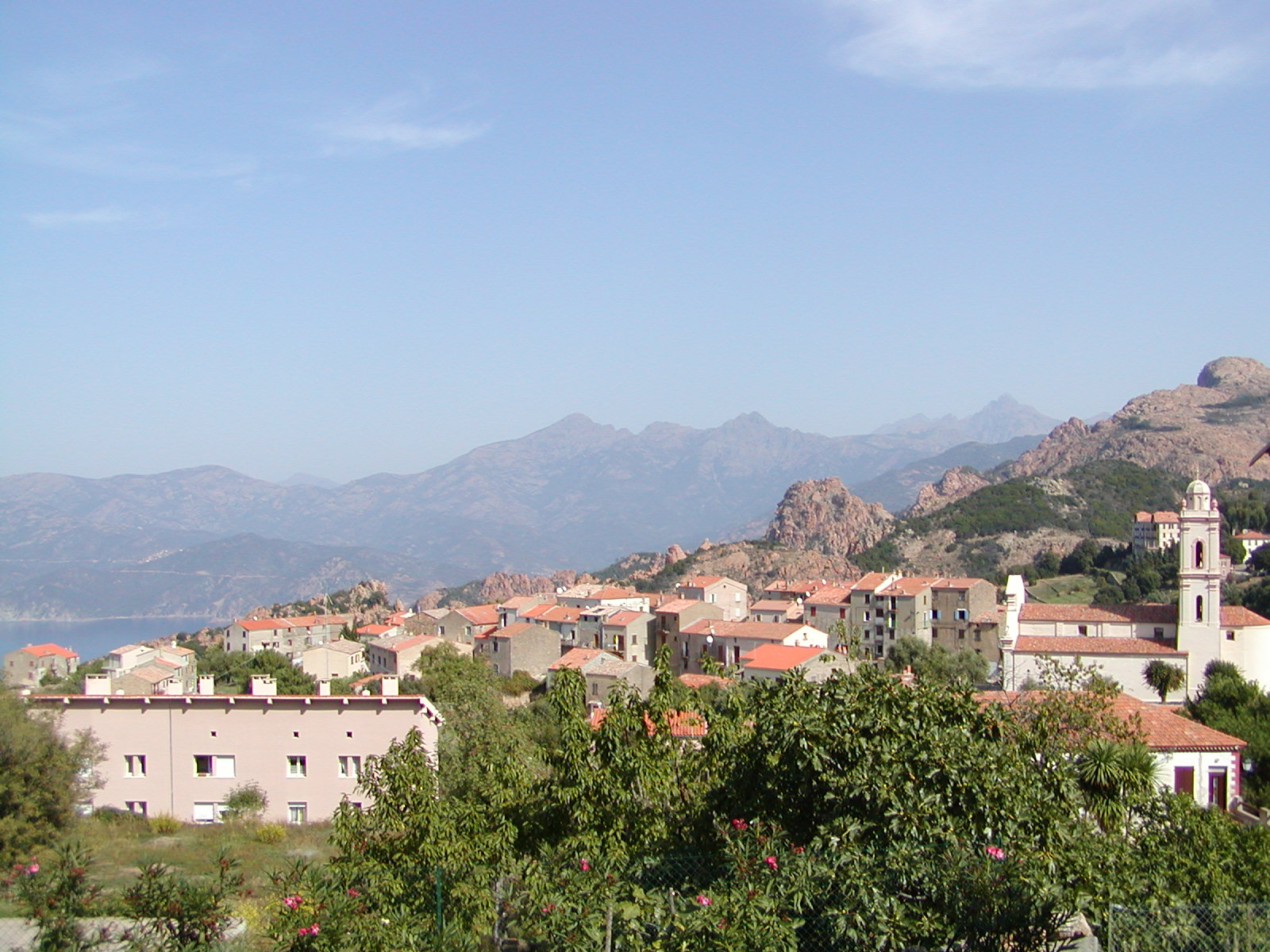
Piana in Corsica

- Corse-du-Sud
  - Piana
- Haute-Corse
  - Sant'Antonino

=== Grand Est ===
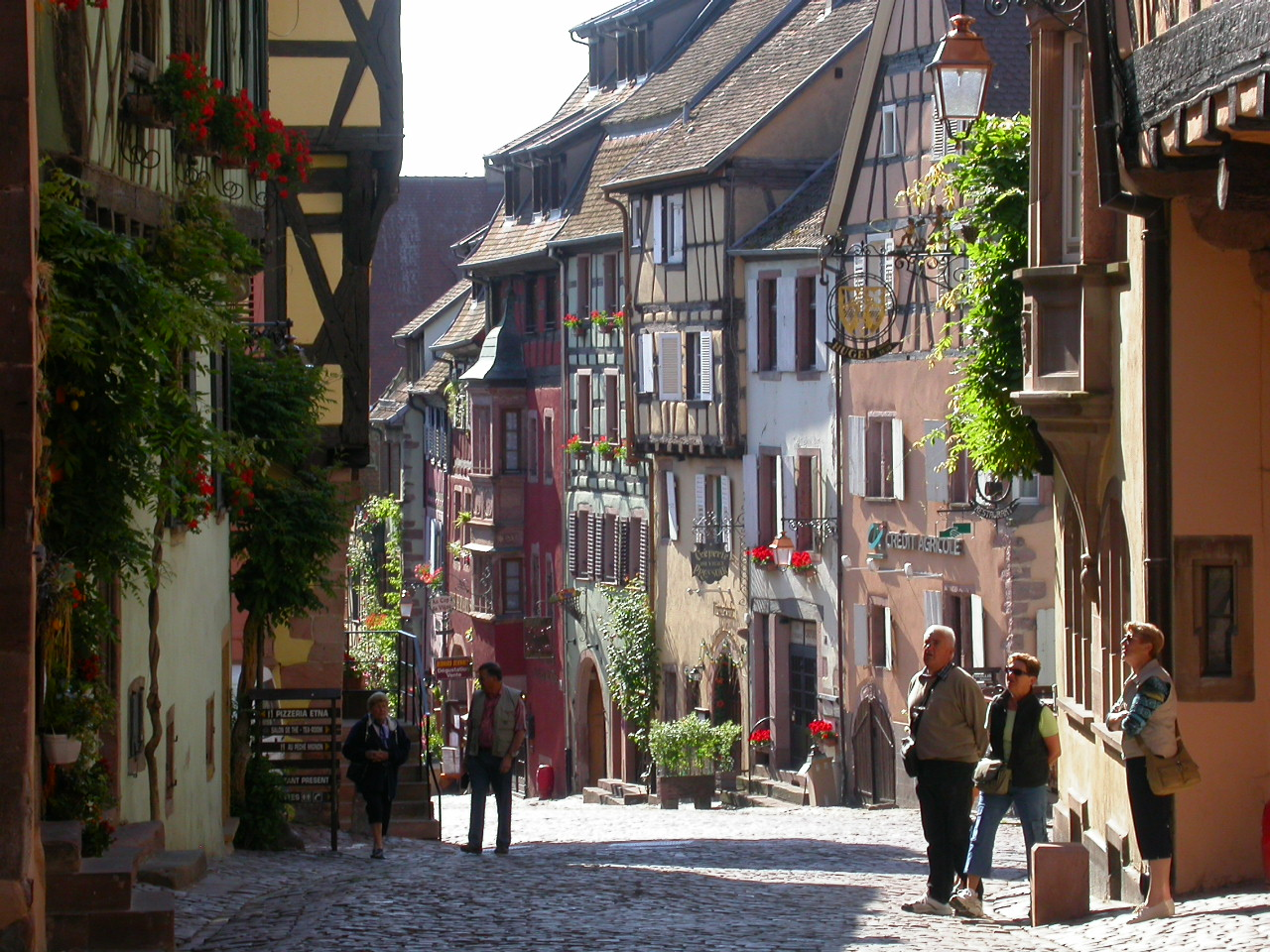
Riquewihr in Alsace

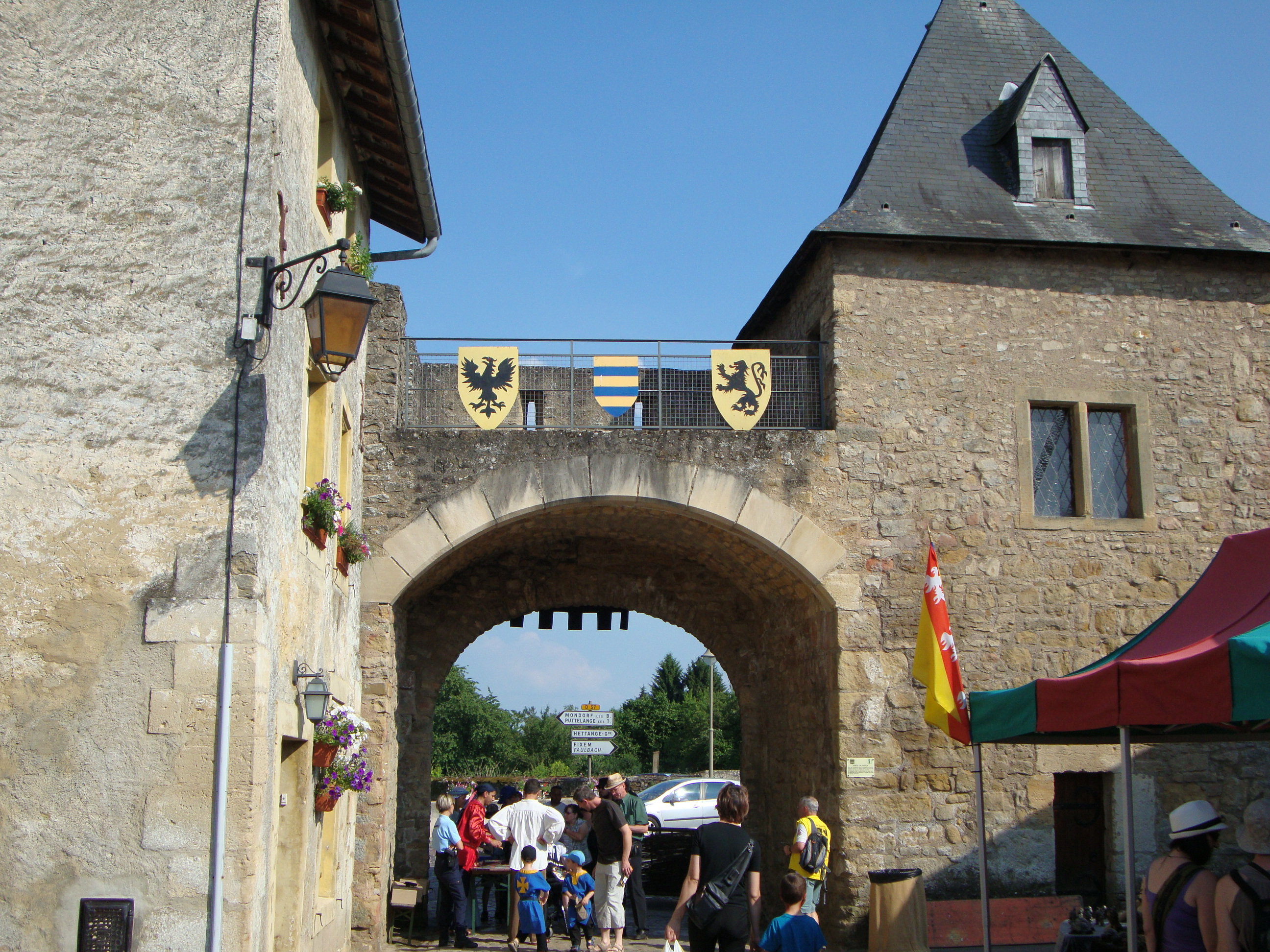
Medieval gates of Rodemack

- Bas-Rhin
  - Hunspach
  - Mittelbergheim
- Haut-Rhin
  - Bergheim
  - Eguisheim
  - Hunawihr
  - Riquewihr
- Moselle
  - Rodemack
  - Saint-Quirin

=== Hauts-de-France ===
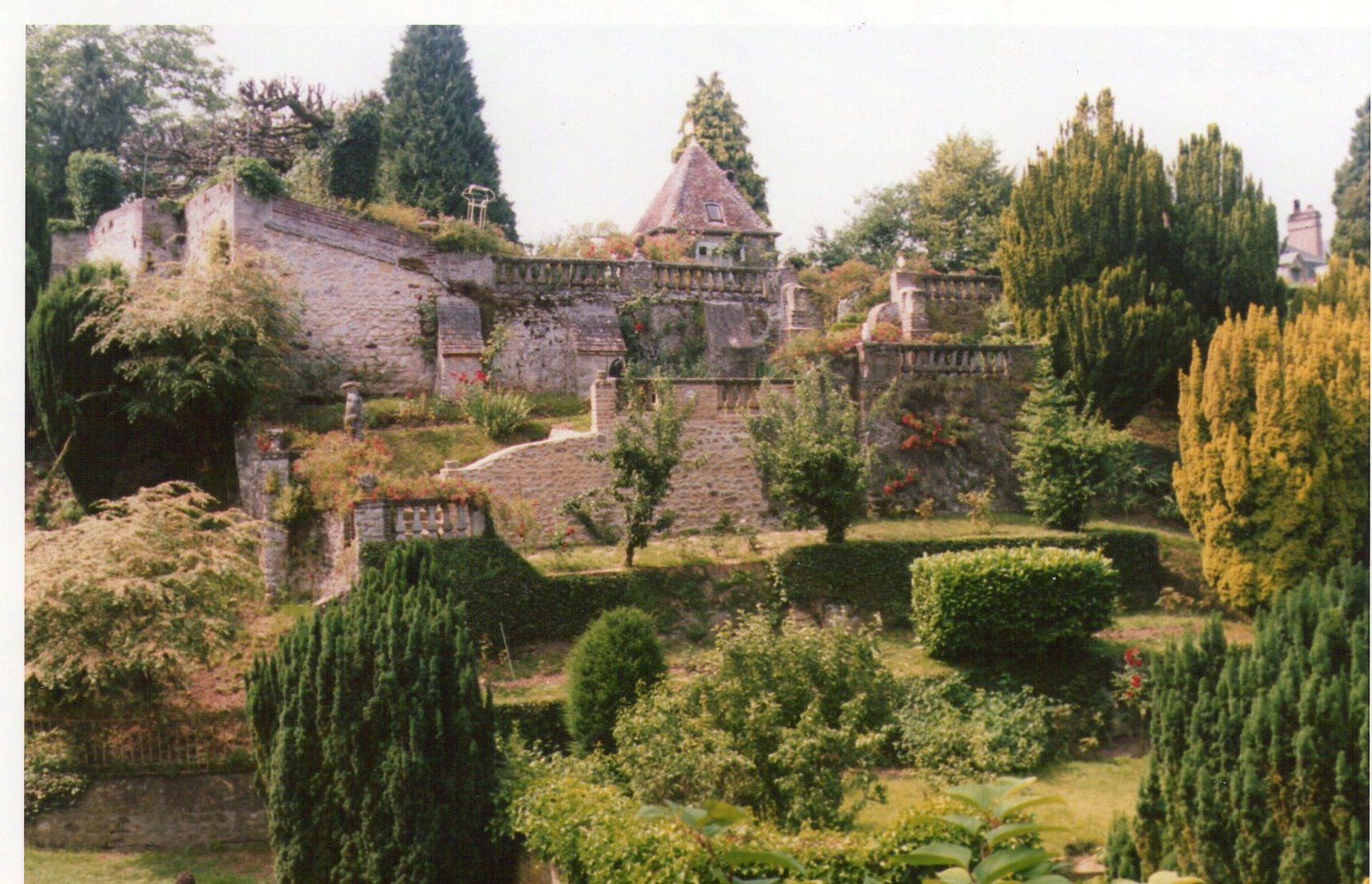
Gerberoy

- Aisne
  - Parfondeval
- Oise
  - Gerberoy

=== Île-de-France ===
- Val-d'Oise
  - La Roche-Guyon

=== Normandy ===
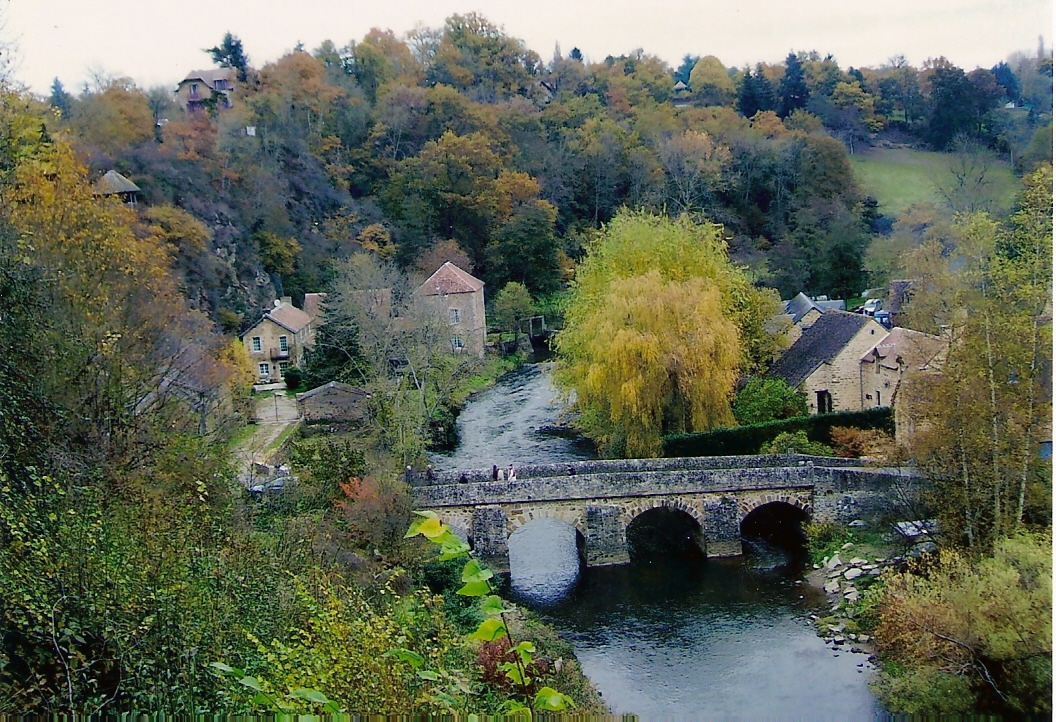
Saint-Céneri-le-Gérei

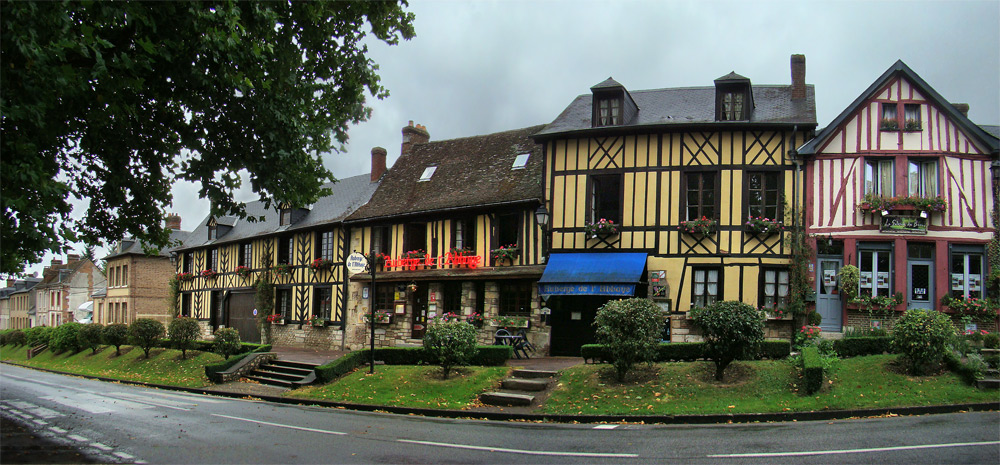
Le Bec-Hellouin

- Calvados
  - Beuvron-en-Auge
- Eure
  - Le Bec-Hellouin
  - Lyons-la-Forêt
- Manche
  - Barfleur
- Orne
  - Saint-Céneri-le-Gérei
- Seine-Maritime
  - Veules-les-Roses

=== Nouvelle-Aquitaine ===
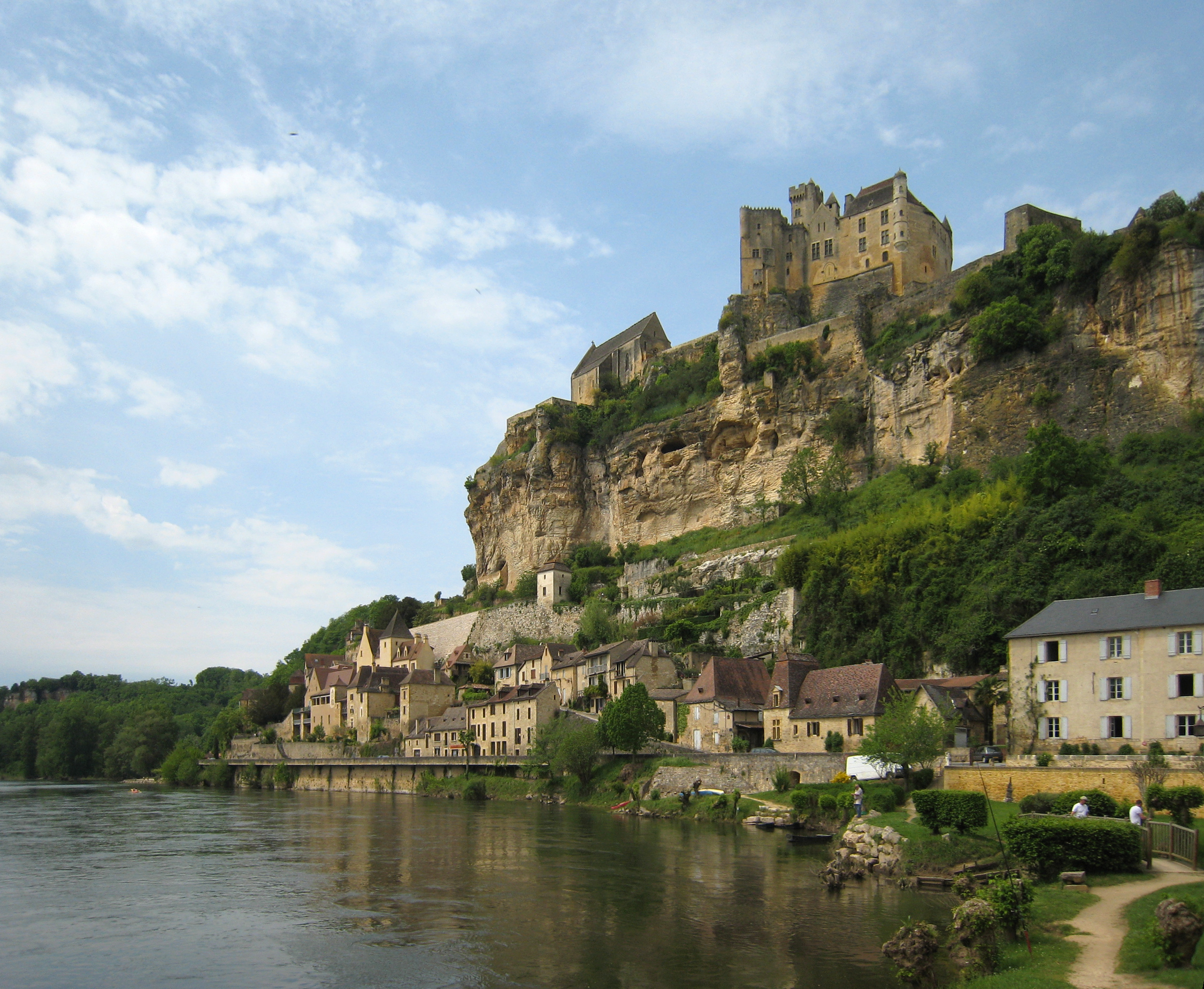
Beynac-et-Cazenac, Dordogne

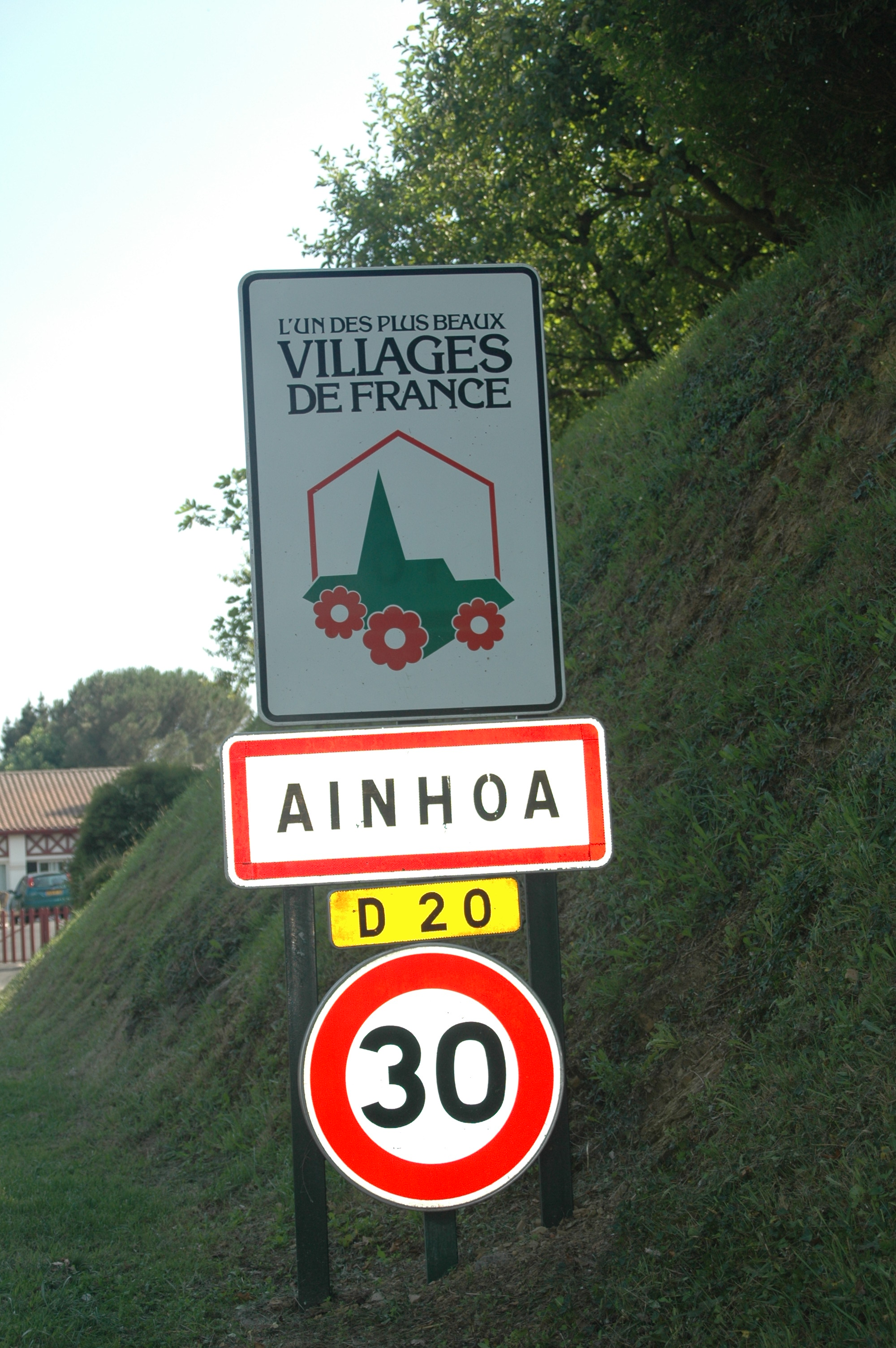
Sign at the entrance of Ainhoa

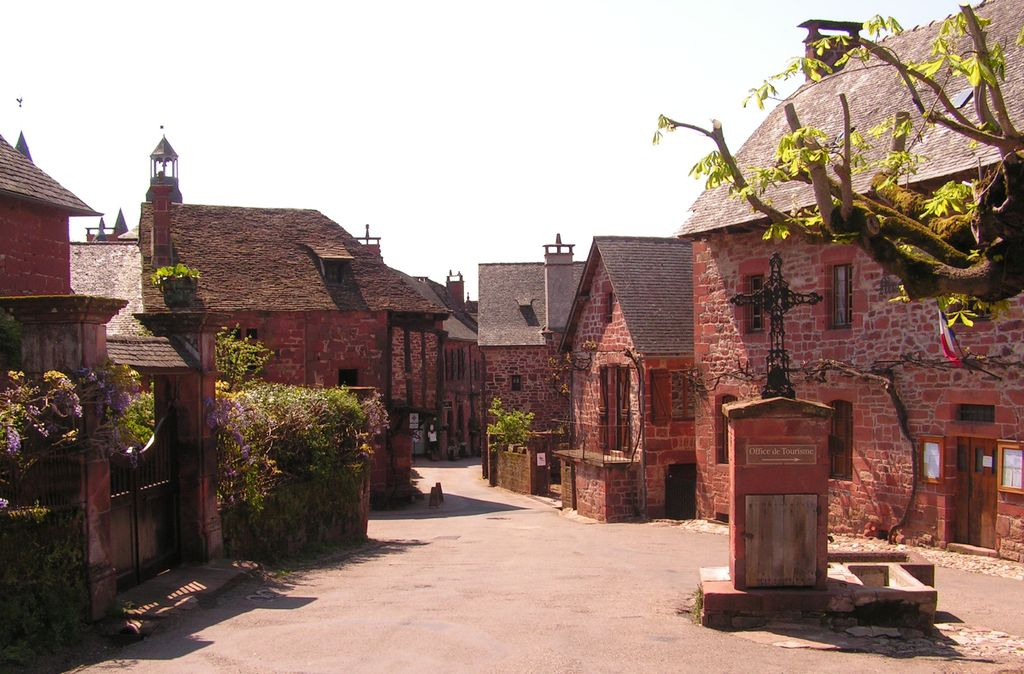
The red village of Collonges-la-Rouge

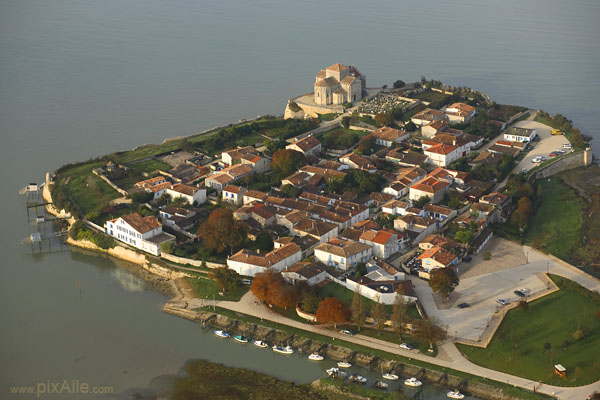
Talmont-sur-Gironde

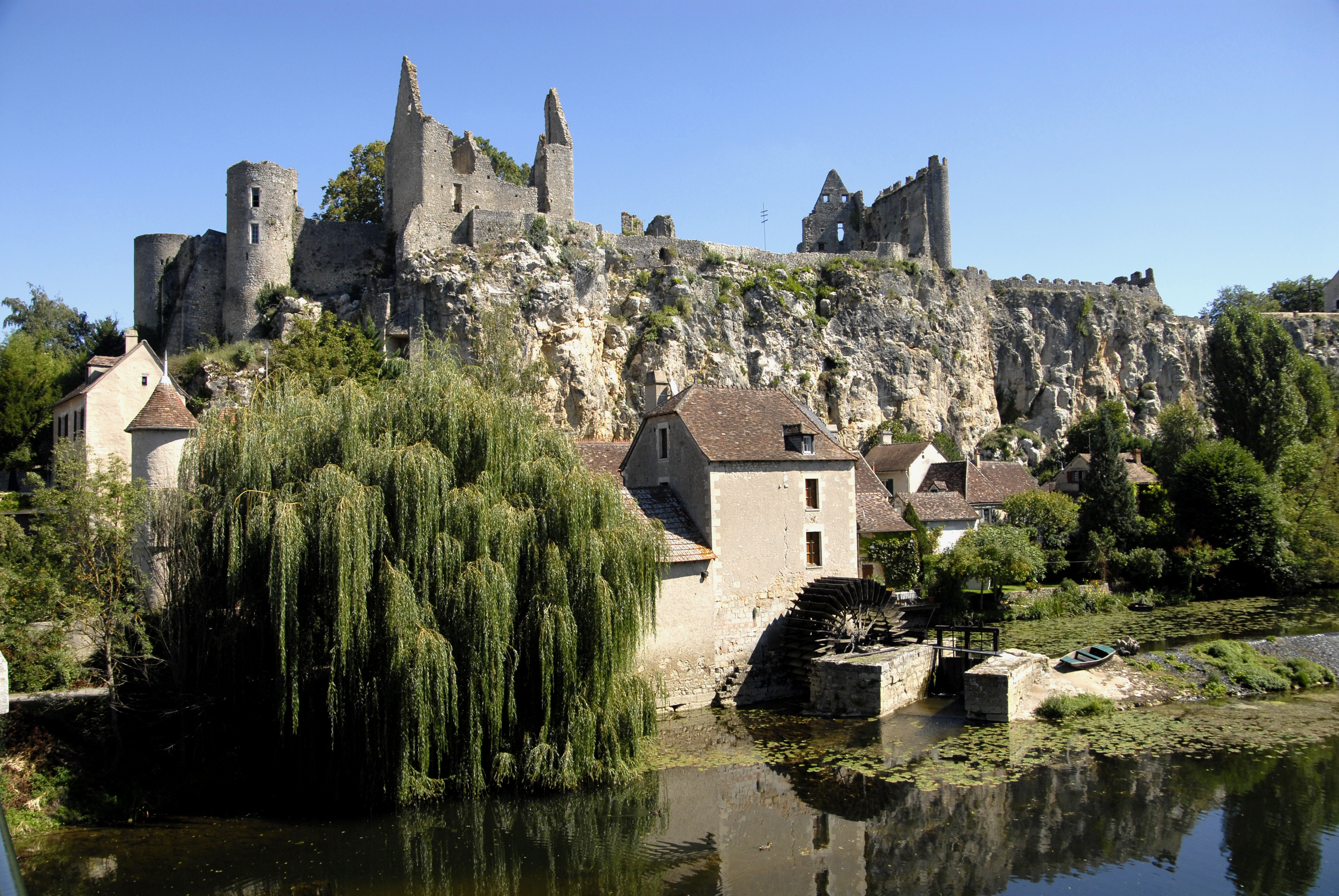
Angles-sur-l'Anglin

- Charente
  - Aubeterre-sur-Dronne
- Charente-Maritime
  - Ars-en-Ré
  - Brouage
  - La Flotte-en-Ré
  - Mornac-sur-Seudre
  - Talmont-sur-Gironde
- Corrèze
  - Beaulieu-sur-Dordogne
  - Collonges-la-Rouge
  - Curemonte
  - Saint-Robert
  - Ségur-le-Château
  - Turenne
- Creuse
  - Chambon-sur-Voueize
- Dordogne
  - Belvès
  - Beynac-et-Cazenac
  - Castelnaud-la-Chapelle
  - Domme
  - La Roque-Gageac
  - Limeuil
  - Monpazier
  - Saint-Amand-de-Coly
  - Saint-Jean-de-Côle
  - Saint-Léon-sur-Vézère
- Haute-Vienne
  - Mortemart
- Lot-et-Garonne
  - Monflanquin
  - Penne-d'Agenais
  - Pujols-le-Haut (commune of Pujols)
  - Tournon-d'Agenais
  - Villeréal
- Pyrénées-Atlantiques
  - Ainhoa
  - La Bastide-Clairence
  - Navarrenx
  - Saint-Jean-Pied-de-Port
  - Sare
- Vienne
  - Angles-sur-l'Anglin

=== Occitania ===
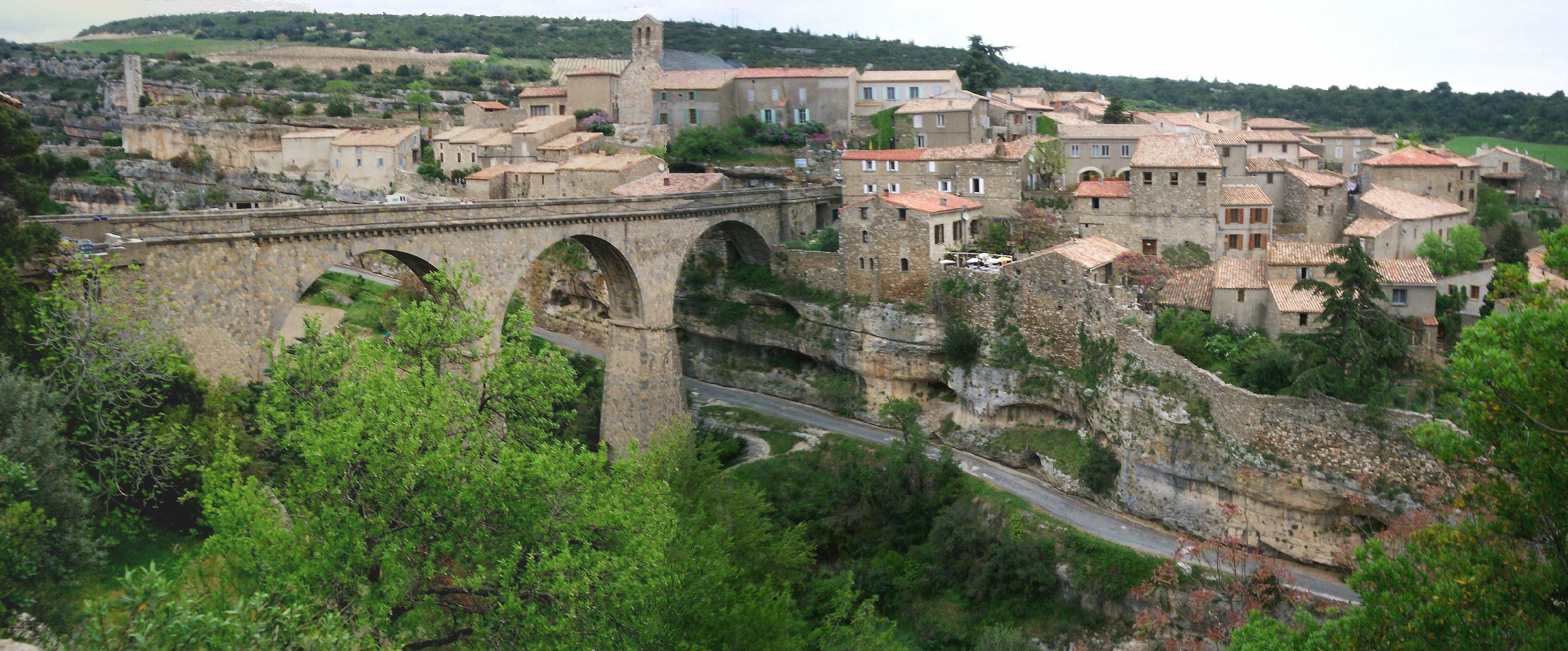
Minerve

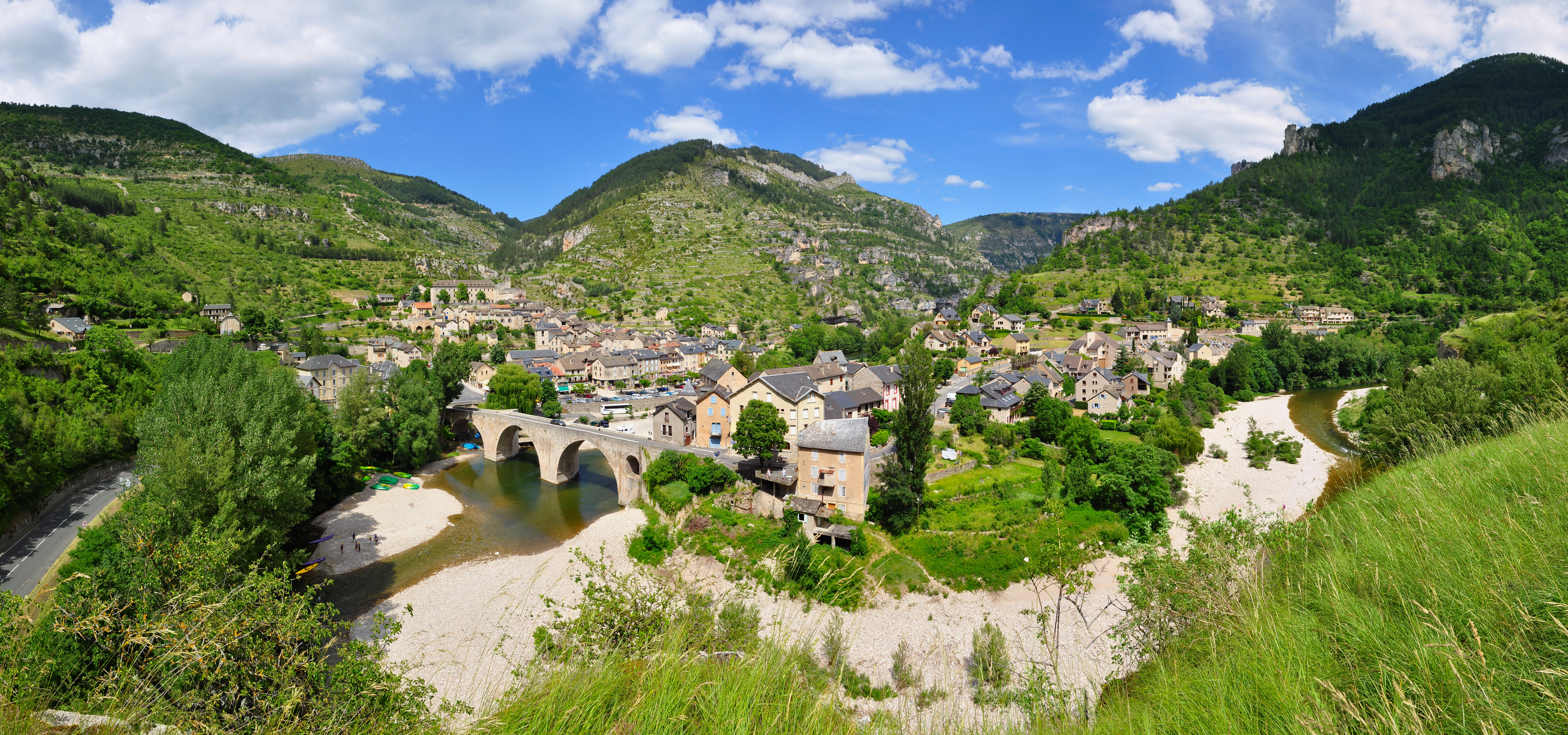
Sainte-Enimie

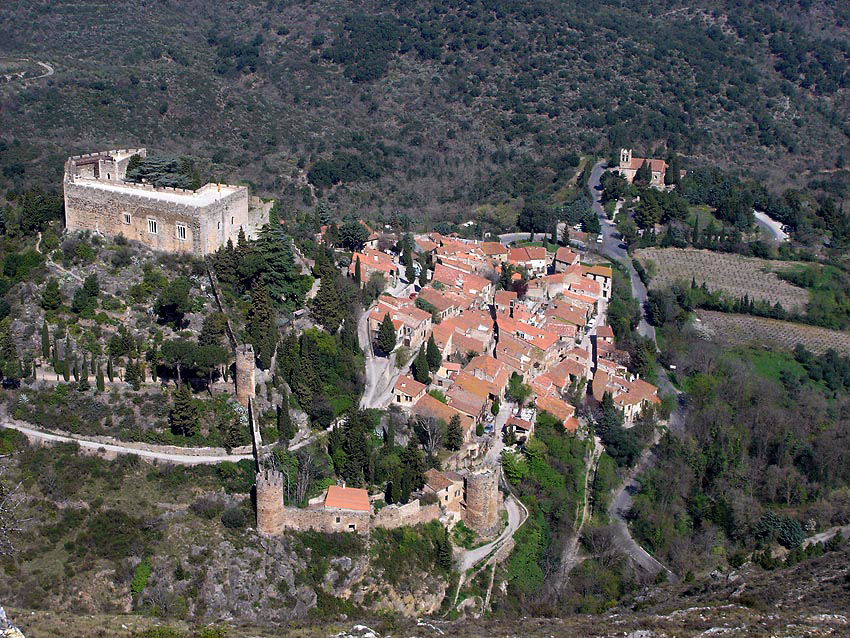
Castelnou in Roussillon

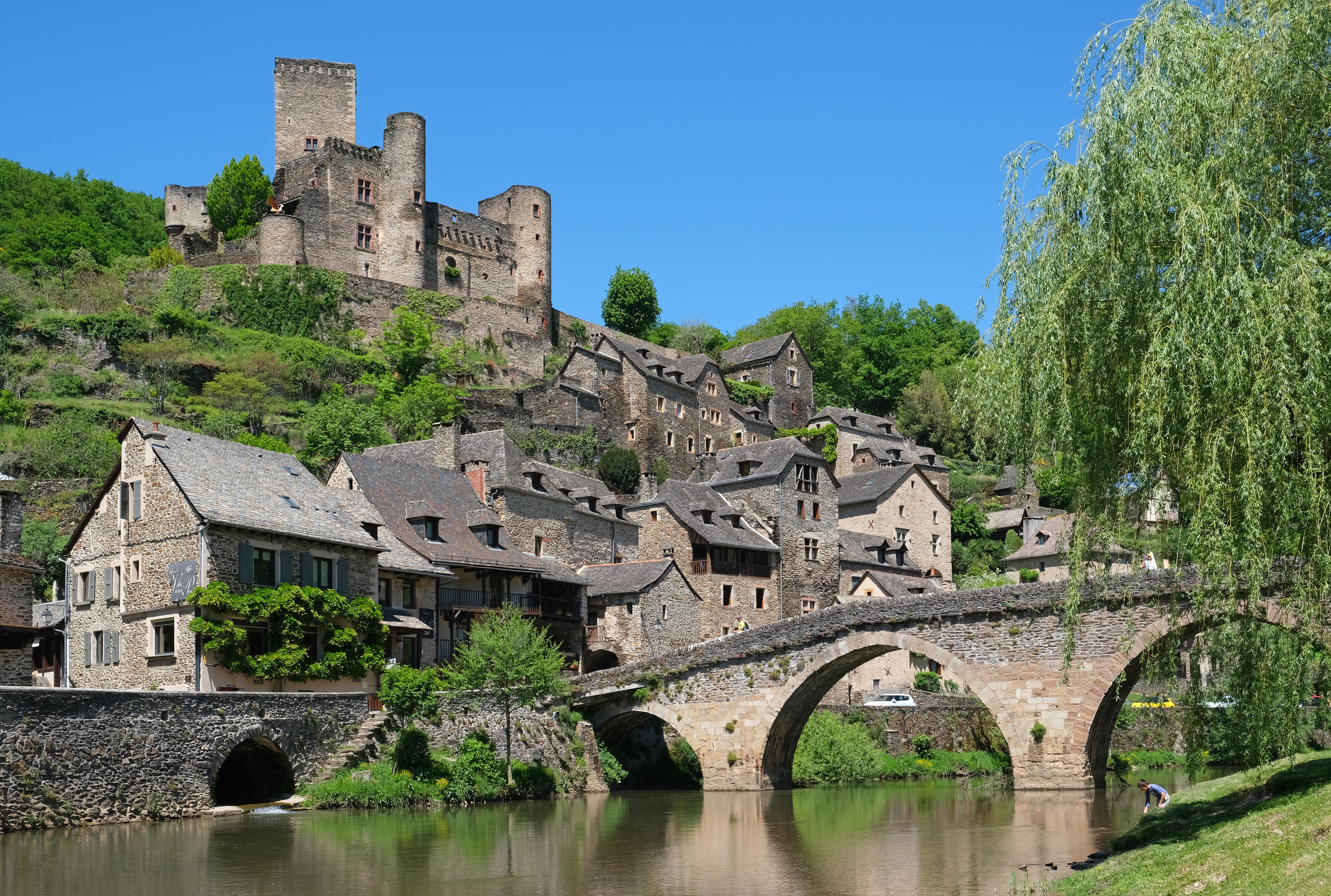
Belcastel

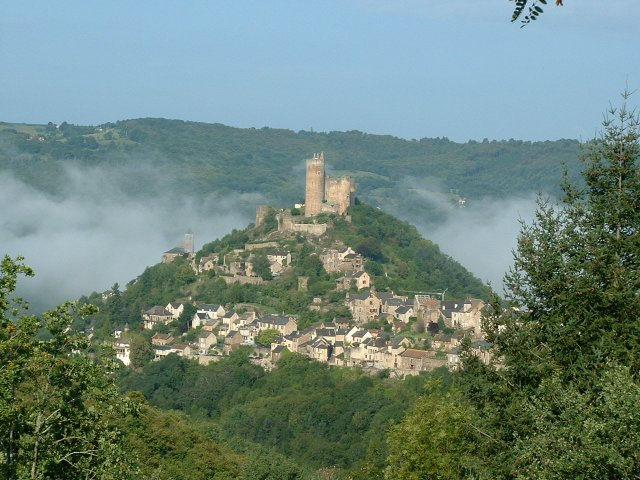
Najac

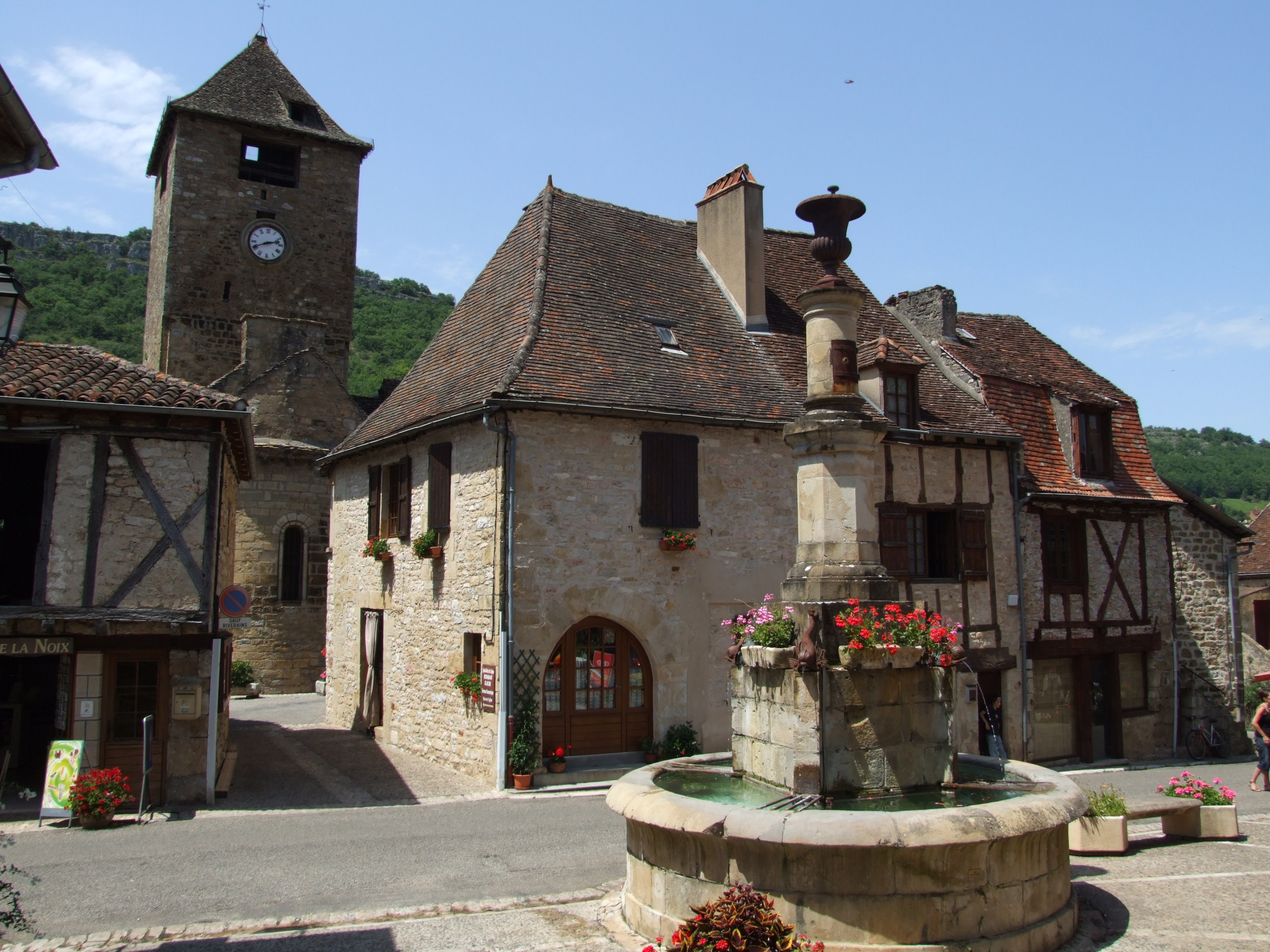
Autoire

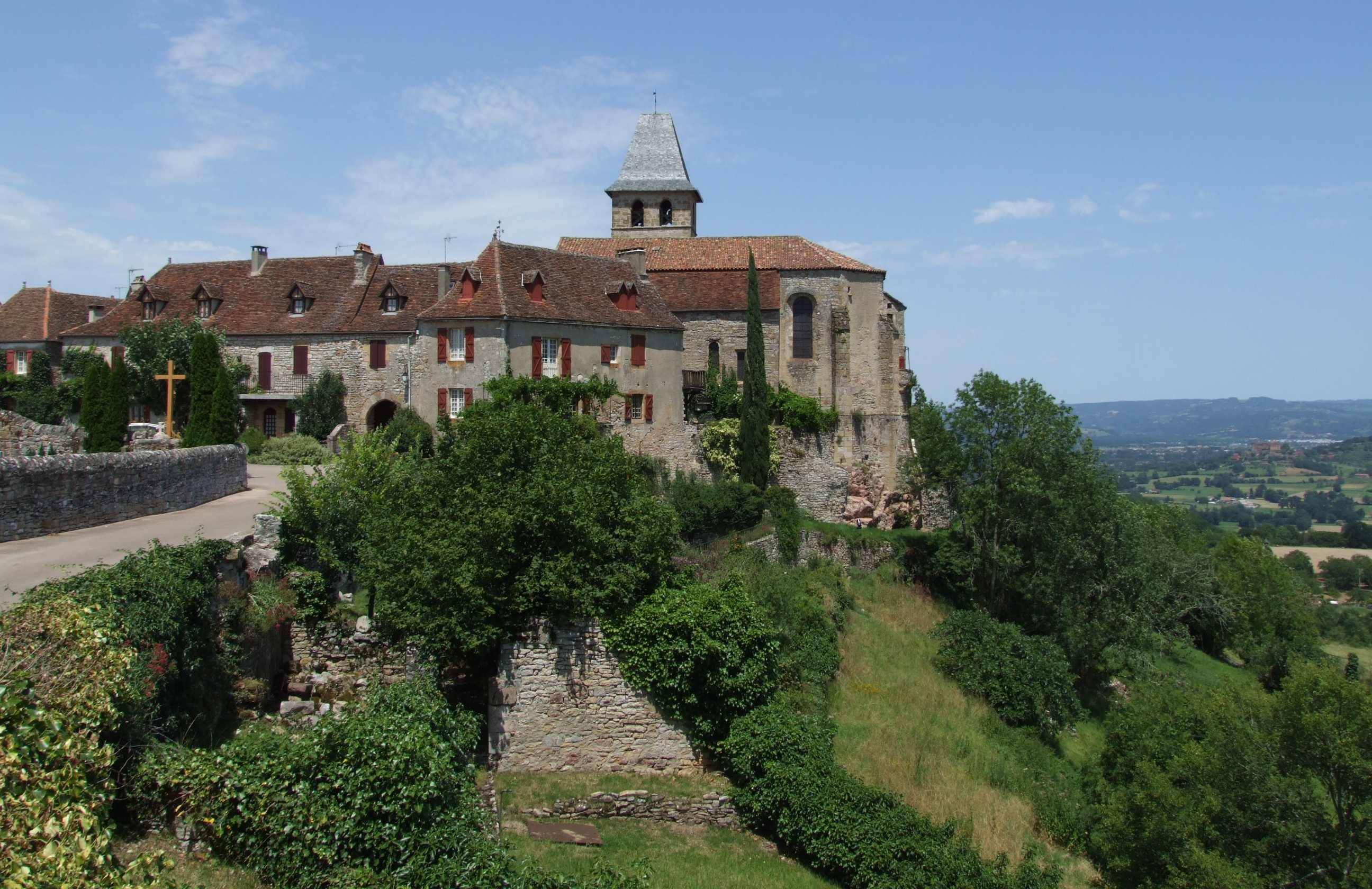
Loubressac

- Ariège
  - Camon
- Aude
  - Lagrasse
- Aveyron
  - Belcastel
  - Brousse-le-Château
  - Conques
  - La Couvertoirade
  - Estaing
  - Najac
  - Peyre (commune of Comprégnac)
  - Saint-Côme-d'Olt
  - Sainte-Eulalie-d'Olt
  - Sauveterre-de-Rouergue
- Gard
  - Aiguèze
  - La Roque-sur-Cèze
  - Lussan
  - Montclus
- Gers
  - Fourcès
  - La Romieu
  - Larressingle
  - Lavardens
  - Montréal
  - Sarrant
- Haute-Garonne
  - Saint-Bertrand-de-Comminges
- Hérault
  - Minerve
  - Olargues
  - Saint-Guilhem-le-Désert
- Lot
  - Autoire
  - Capdenac
  - Cardaillac
  - Carennac
  - Loubressac
  - Martel
  - Rocamadour
  - Saint-Cirq-Lapopie
- Lozère
  - La Garde-Guérin (commune of Prévenchères)
  - Le Malzieu-Ville
  - Sainte-Enimie
- Pyrénées-Orientales
  - Castelnou
  - Eus
  - Évol (commune of Olette-Évol)
  - Prats-de-Mollo-la-Preste
  - Villefranche-de-Conflent
- Tarn
  - Castelnau-de-Montmiral
  - Cordes-sur-Ciel
  - Lautrec
  - Monestiés
  - Puycelsi
- Tarn-et-Garonne
  - Auvillar
  - Bruniquel
  - Lauzerte

=== Pays de la Loire ===
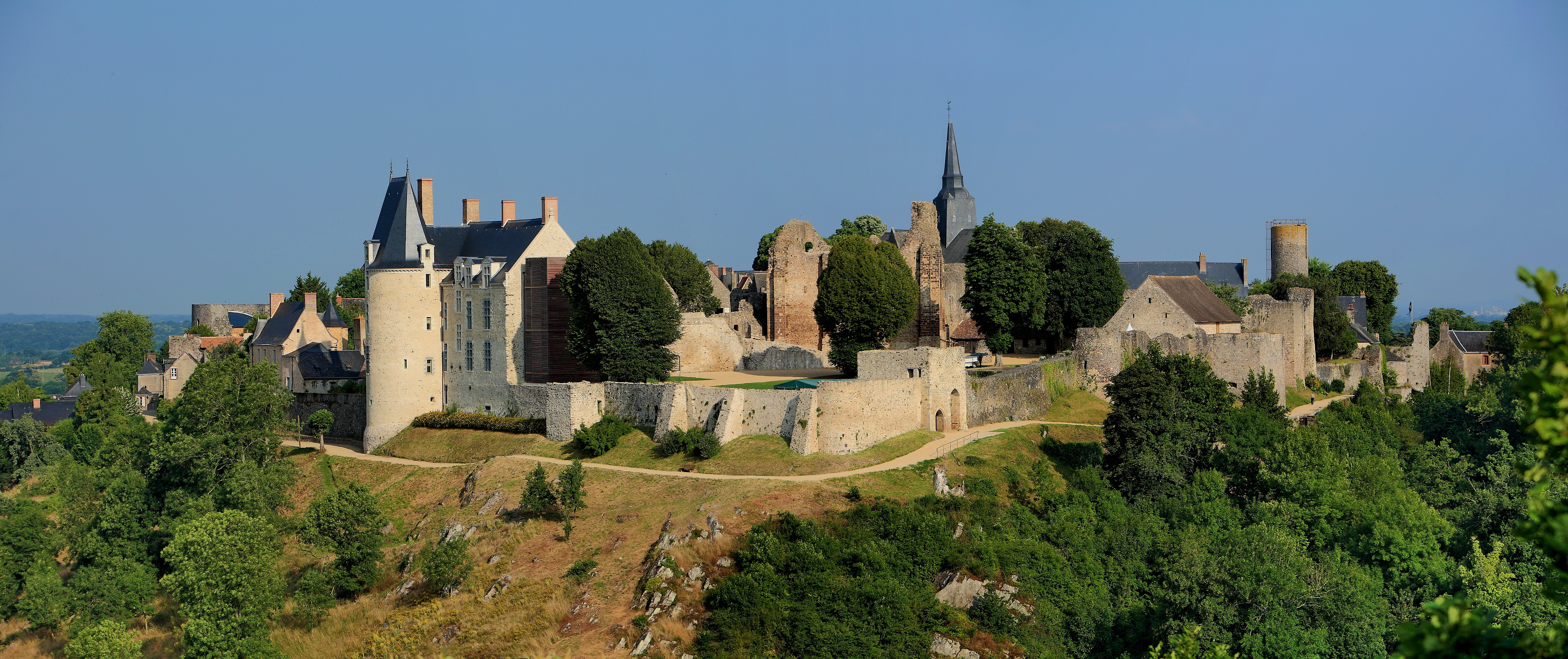
Sainte-Suzanne, Mayenne

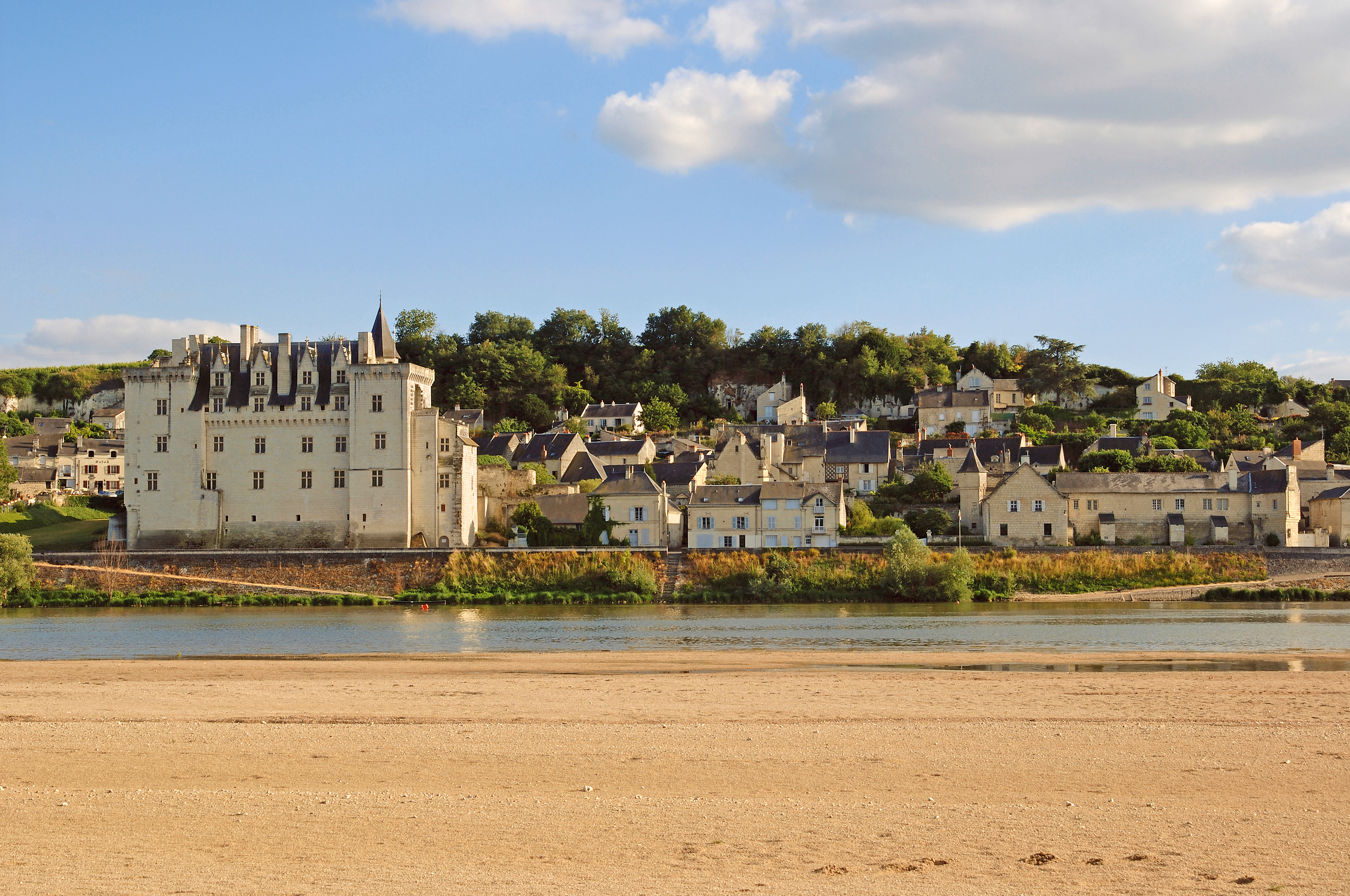
Montsoreau, Maine-et-Loire

- Maine-et-Loire
  - Montsoreau
- Mayenne
  - Sainte-Suzanne, Mayenne
- Vendée
  - Vouvant

=== Provence-Alpes-Côte d'Azur ===
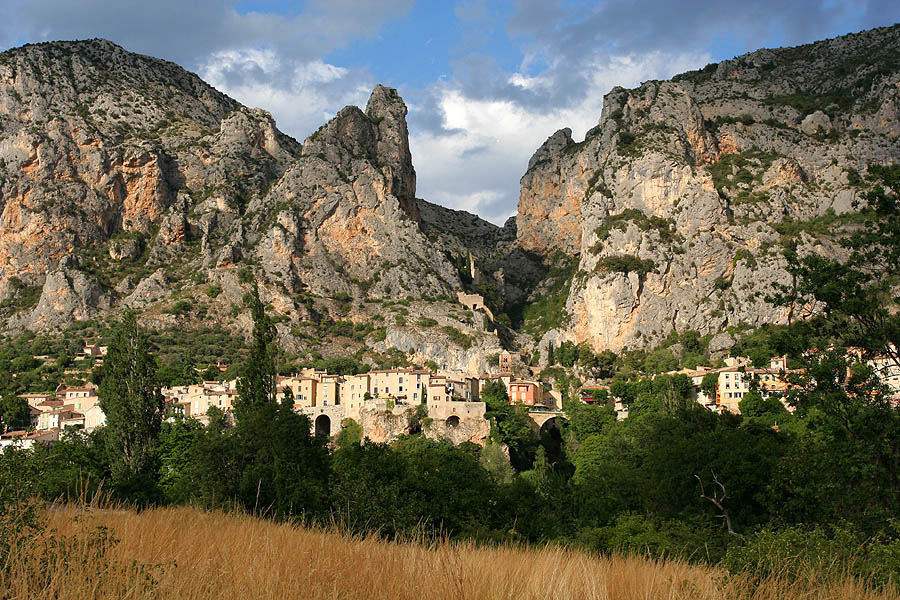
Moustiers-Sainte-Marie

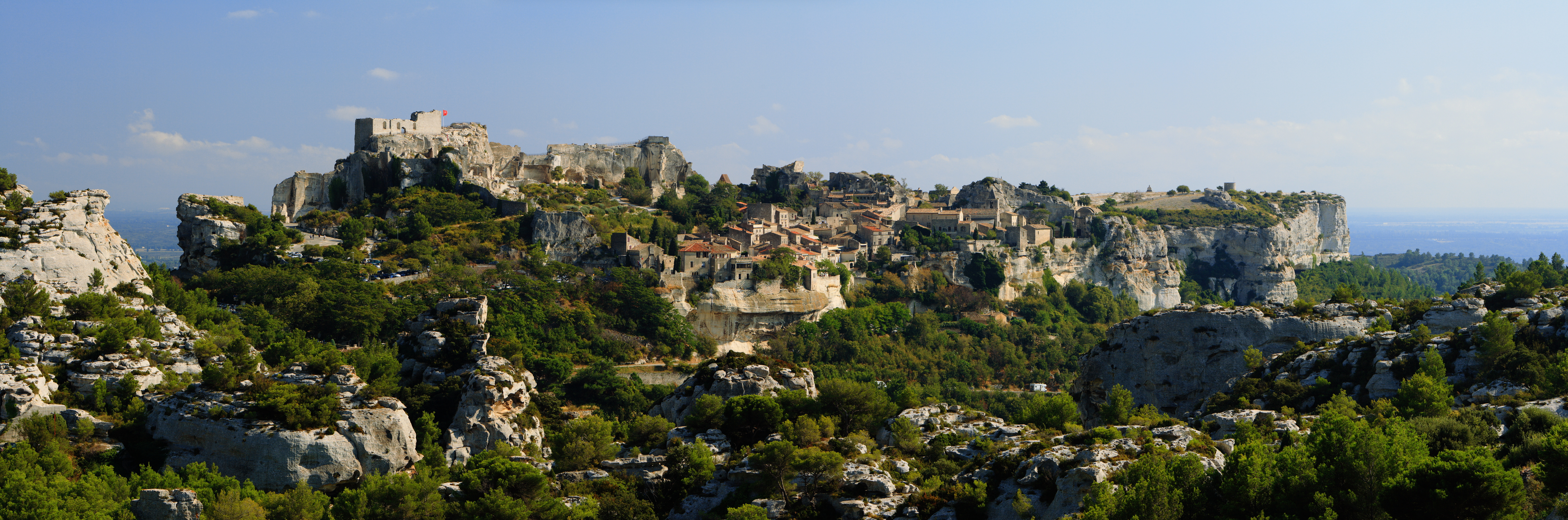
Les Baux-de-Provence

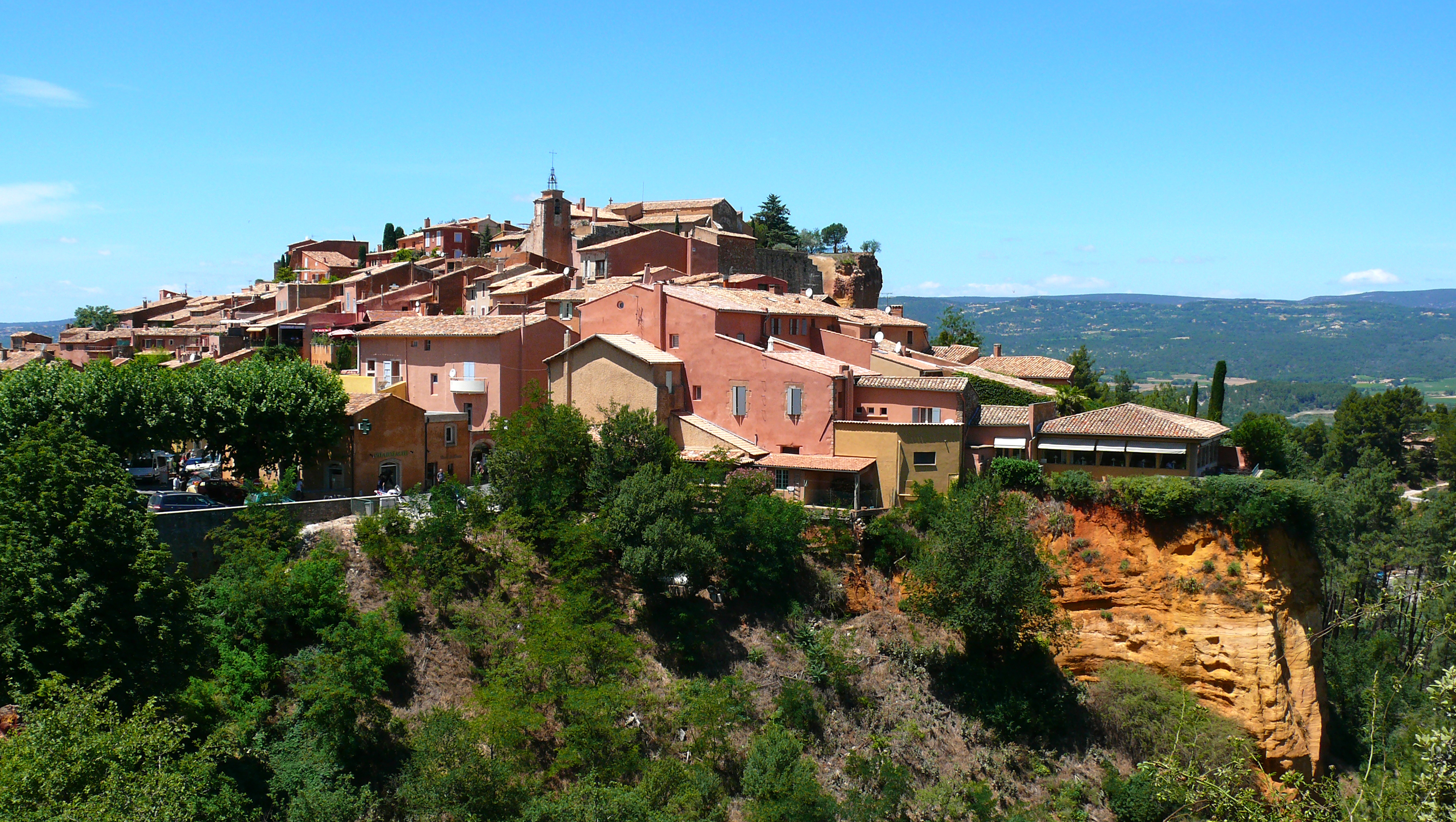
Roussillon

- Alpes-de-Haute-Provence
  - Entrevaux
  - Moustiers-Sainte-Marie
- Alpes-Maritimes
  - Coaraze
  - Gourdon
  - Sainte-Agnès
  - Saorge
- Bouches-du-Rhône
  - Les Baux-de-Provence
- Hautes-Alpes
  - La Grave-la-Meije
  - Saint-Véran
- Var
  - Bargème
  - Cotignac
  - Gassin
  - Le Castellet
  - Seillans
  - Tourtour
- Vaucluse
  - Ansouis
  - Gordes
  - Lourmarin
  - Ménerbes
  - Roussillon
  - Séguret
  - Venasque

=== Overseas departments and territories of France ===
- Réunion
  - Hell-Bourg (commune of Salazie)

== See also ==
- Tourism in France
- French Towns and Lands of Art and History
