= Yèvre-la-Ville =

- Commune
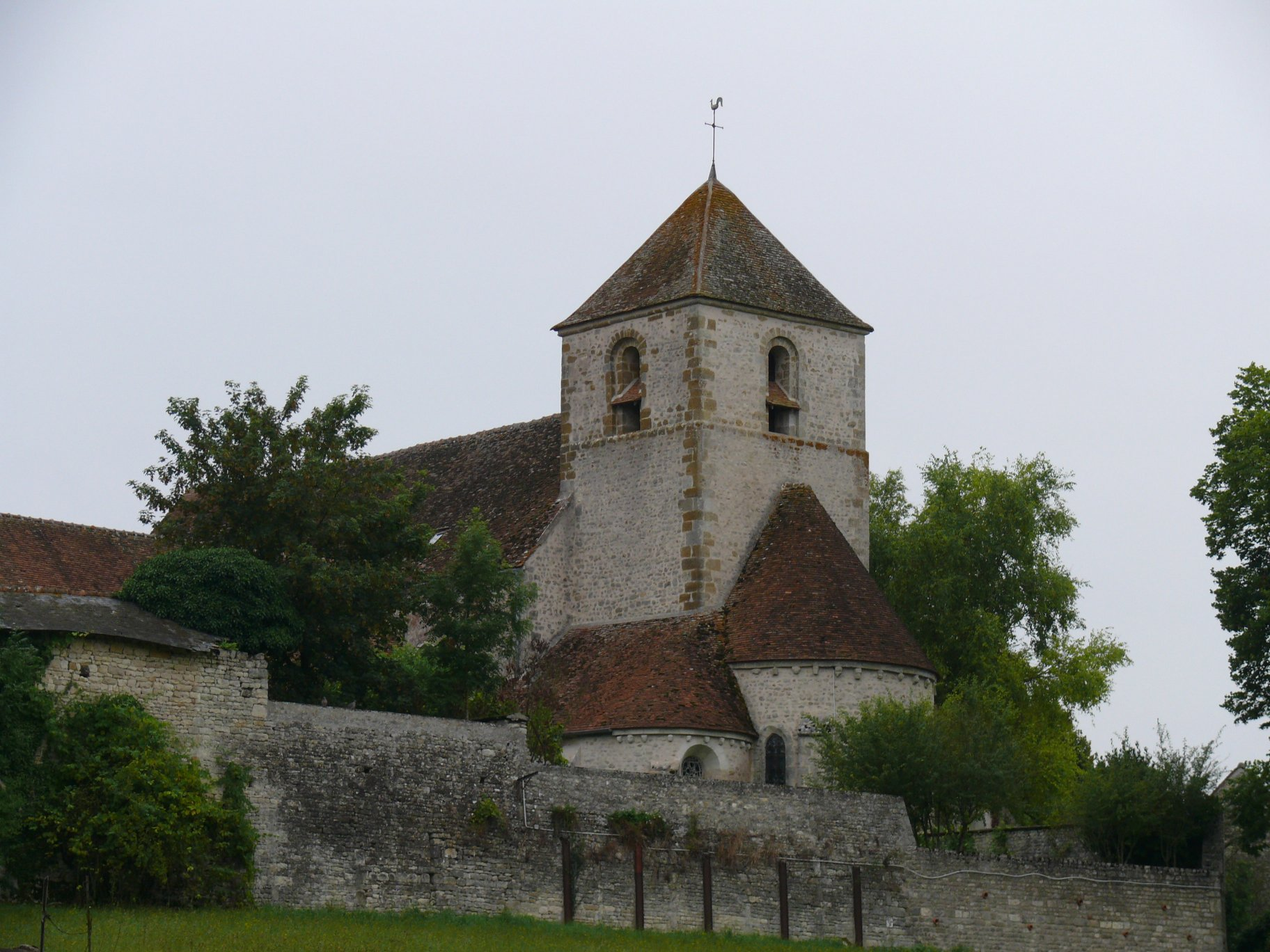
- The church in Yèvre-la-Ville
- Location of Yèvre-la-Ville
- Location within France Location within Centre-Val de Loire
- Coordinates: 48°08′47″N 2°19′38″E
- Country: France
- Region: Centre-Val de Loire
- Department: Loiret
- Arrondissement: Pithiviers
- Canton: Le Malesherbois
- Intercommunality: Pithiverais

Government
  - Mayor (2020–2026): Patricia Pailloux
- Area^{1}: 26.77 km^{2} (10.34 sq mi)
- Highest elevation: 127 m (417 ft)
- Lowest elevation: 92 m (302 ft)
- Population (2023): 652
  - Density: 24.4/km^{2} (63.1/sq mi)
- Time zone: UTC+01:00 (CET)
  - Summer (DST): UTC+02:00 (CEST)
- INSEE/Postal code: 45348 /45300
- ^{1} French Land Register data, which excludes lakes, ponds, glaciers > 1 km^{2} (0.386 sq mi or 247 acres) and river estuaries.

Yèvre-la-Ville (French pronunciation: [jɛvʁ la vil]) is a commune in the Loiret department in north-central France.

== History ==
Since 1973, the village of Yèvre-le-Châtel, previously an independent commune, is part of Yèvre-la-Ville. Yèvre-le-Châtel is a member of the Les Plus Beaux Villages de France ("The most beautiful villages of France") association.

== Population ==
Historical population
Year	Pop.	±% p.a.
1968	652	—
1975	613	−0.88%
1982	637	+0.55%
1990	698	+1.15%
1999	703	+0.08%
2007	684	−0.34%
2012	718	+0.97%
2017	702	−0.45%
2023	652	−1.22%
Source: INSEE

== See also ==
- Communes of the Loiret department
