= Lods =

- Commune
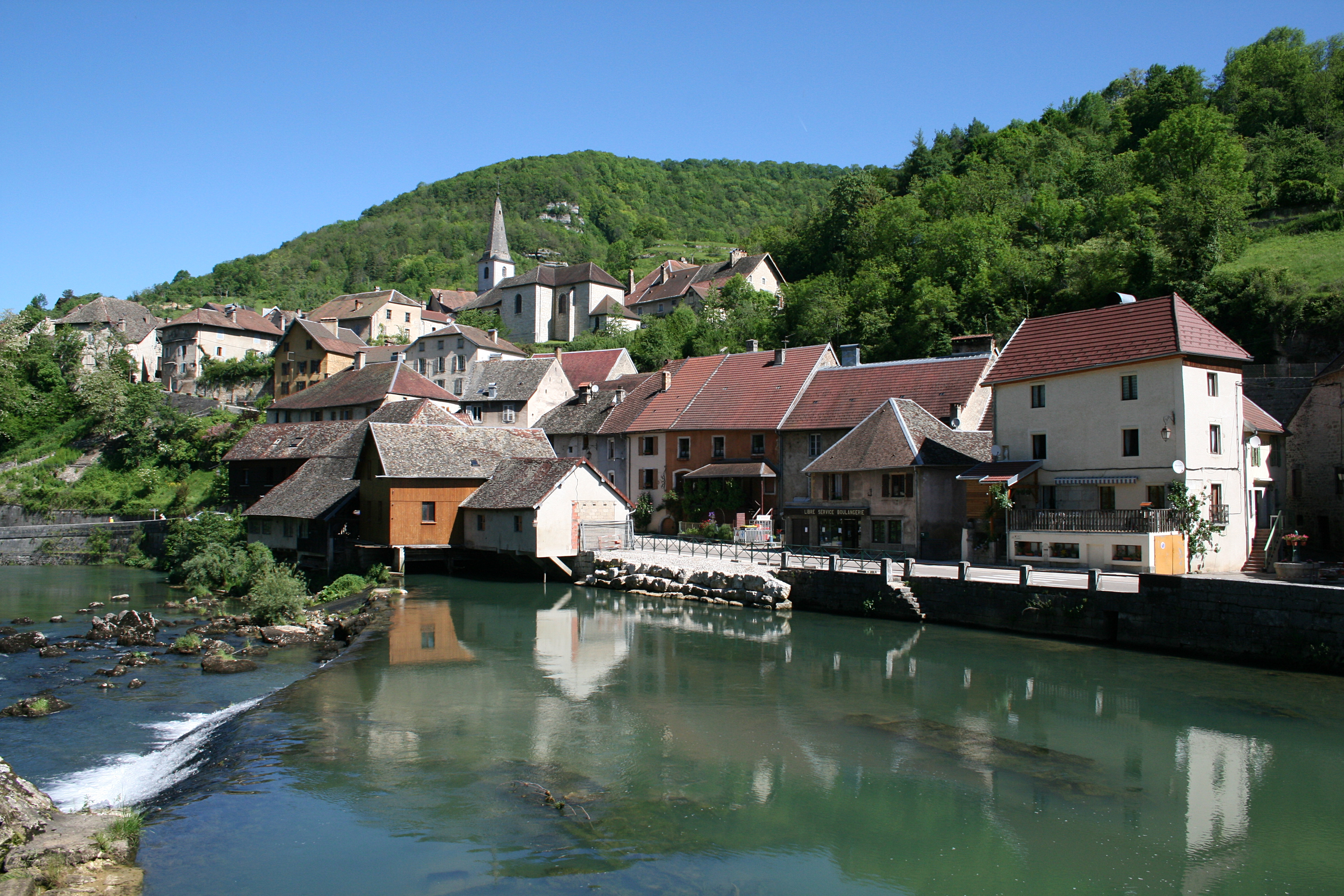
- A view of Lods and the Loue river

- Coat of arms
- Location of Lods
- Location within France Location within Bourgogne-Franche-Comté
- Coordinates: 47°02′45″N 6°14′56″E
- Country: France
- Region: Bourgogne-Franche-Comté
- Department: Doubs
- Arrondissement: Besançon
- Canton: Ornans

Government
  - Mayor (2020–2026): Jean-Michel Lièvremont
- Area^{1}: 6.25 km^{2} (2.41 sq mi)
- Highest elevation: 770 m (2,530 ft)
- Lowest elevation: 355 m (1,165 ft)
- Population (2023): 253
  - Density: 40.5/km^{2} (105/sq mi)
- Time zone: UTC+01:00 (CET)
  - Summer (DST): UTC+02:00 (CEST)
- INSEE/Postal code: 25339 /25930
- ^{1} French Land Register data, which excludes lakes, ponds, glaciers > 1 km^{2} (0.386 sq mi or 247 acres) and river estuaries.

Lods (French pronunciation: [lo]) is a commune in the Doubs département in the Bourgogne-Franche-Comté region in eastern France. It is a member of Les Plus Beaux Villages de France (The Most Beautiful Villages of France) Association.

== Geography ==
Lods is located 12 km (7.5 mi) southeast of Ornans in the valley of the Loue River.

== History ==
It is first documented in 1189, and there are archaeological remains from the fifth and the seventh centuries.

== Population ==
Historical population
Year	Pop.	±% p.a.
1968	380	—
1975	338	−1.66%
1982	337	−0.04%
1990	284	−2.12%
1999	271	−0.52%
2007	248	−1.10%
2012	227	−1.75%
2017	219	−0.71%
2023	253	+2.43%
Source: INSEE

== Economy ==
Viticulture was the primary activity until the phylloxera infestation. The arrival of the railroad caused both the vineyards and the forges to decline due to outside competition.

== Tourism ==
Lods is a village with two hotels and a campground. Outdoor activities include tennis, fishing, and canoeing. Also worth seeing are the Musée de la Vigne et du Vin viticulture museum and art gallery.

== See also ==
- Communes of the Doubs department
