= Turenne, Corrèze =

Turenne
- Commune
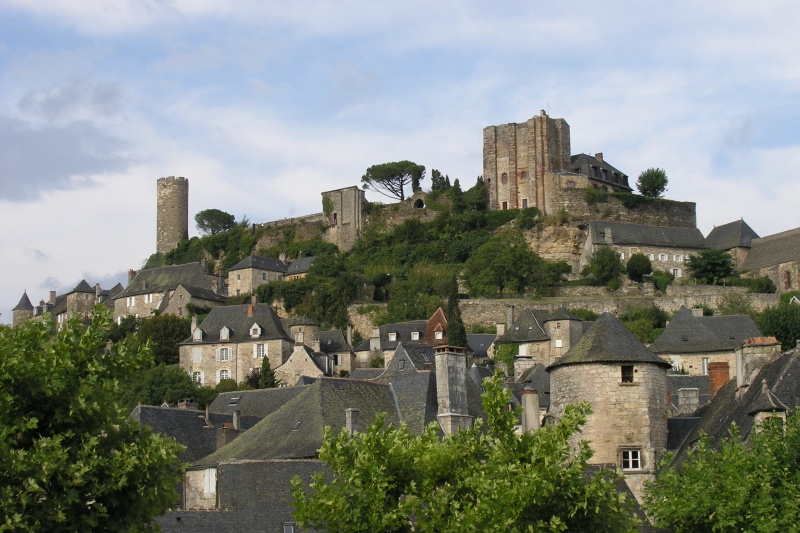
- Castle

- Coat of arms
- Location of Turenne
- Location within France Location within Nouvelle-Aquitaine
- Coordinates: 45°03′15″N 1°34′57″E
- Country: France
- Region: Nouvelle-Aquitaine
- Department: Corrèze
- Arrondissement: Brive-la-Gaillarde
- Canton: Saint-Pantaléon-de-Larche
- Intercommunality: CA Bassin de Brive

Government
  - Mayor (2020–2026): Yves Gary
- Area^{1}: 28.03 km^{2} (10.82 sq mi)
- Elevation: 257 m (843 ft)
- Highest elevation: 408 m (1,339 ft)
- Lowest elevation: 140 m (460 ft)
- Population (2023): 801
  - Density: 28.6/km^{2} (74.0/sq mi)
- Demonym: Viscomtins
- Time zone: UTC+01:00 (CET)
  - Summer (DST): UTC+02:00 (CEST)
- INSEE/Postal code: 19273 /19500
- ^{1} French Land Register data, which excludes lakes, ponds, glaciers > 1 km^{2} (0.386 sq mi or 247 acres) and river estuaries.

Turenne (French pronunciation: [tyʁɛn]; Limousin: Torena) is a commune in the Corrèze department in the Nouvelle-Aquitaine region in central France. It is characterised by its height and unique position on top of a cliff.

It is a member of Les Plus Beaux Villages de France (The Most Beautiful Villages of France) Association (along with 157 others, including neighbouring Loubressac, Autoire, Curemonte and Carennac). It also has a well-known castle.

== History ==
The first lords of Turenne appeared in the 9th century. The town became a veritable feudal state after the Crusades and one of the great fiefs of France in the 14th century. From the Middle Ages to the 18th century, the viscount of Turenne had complete autonomy. Until 1738 the sheriffs, despite honoring the French king with simple tributes, were free of taxation and acted as true sovereigns; convening the Estates General, raising taxes, coining money, and ennobling. The Viscounty formed a state within a state. Thus, when the king banned tobacco (introduced in Aquitaine in 1560), the measure did not apply in the viscounty.

The fiefdom of Turenne occupied a territory bounded by three provinces and three bishoprics. Part of the Périgord Noir (Black Périgord), the fiefdom was adjacent to Lower Limousin and Quercy. It controlled the transfer of livestock between the plateaus of Quercy and Limousin, At its largest in the 15th century, it spanned from around Meymac or Lapleau to the north-east, Terrasson to the west, and Gramat to the south. At that time, the major fortified cities of the Viscount were Argentat, Servieres, Beaulieu, Gagnac, Martel, Saint-Cere, and Turenne; other walled cities included the bastides of Bretenoux and Puybrun, the cities of Carennac, Vayrac, Curemonte, Meyssac, and Collonges. There are now about 100,000 inhabitants in the entire region, divided into 18,500 "feux", 111 parishes, 1200 villages, and many monasteries.

Turenne has seen a succession of four families of Viscounts. From the 9th century to the thirteenth, the Comborn, from the valley of the Vézère (and who had actively participated in the Crusades and Anglo-French wars) obtained extensive privileges from the kings of France. Then, during the first half of the 14th century, the Viscounty was taken over by the Comminges, Pyrenées feudal lords, before being transferred for 94 years to Roger de Beaufort from which came two Popes of Avignon, Clement VI and Gregory XI. This family had two Viscounts: Roger William III of Beaufort and Raymond de Turenne XIII, and two viscountesses names Antoinette de Turenne and Eleonore de Beaujeu. Then, from 1444 to 1738, the Viscounty became the possession of the family of La Tour d'Auvergne. In their heyday, Henri de la Tour d'Auvergne, co-religionist and companion-at-arms of King Henry IV, became Duke of Bouillion and Prince of Sedan. His son Henry, Marshal of France, received the nickname "The Great Turenne".

Under La Tour d'Auvergne, the Viscounty lasted until the Reformation. Calvinism was spread by the boatmen of the Dordogne throughout the region. In 1575, after St. Bartholomew, Henri de la Tour engaged with Henri of Navarre and Turenne became a hotbed of religious wars and disorders of the Fronde.

On 8 June 1738, Turenne was sold to Louis XV to pay the gambling debts of Charles Godfrey, the last of the Viscounts of the Tour d'Auvergne family. Thus ended the quasi-independence of this last French stronghold. The Viscounty's subjects became subjects of Louis XV and were forced to pay taxes. The king also ordered the dismantling of the fortress of Turenne. As of the French Revolution, Turenne was more like a seat of a royal provost.

Under the Revolution, to follow a decree of the Convention, the town changed its name to Mount Franc (the name was later restored to Turenne).

== Geography ==
Turenne sits atop the Martel Causse, a limestone formation which now supports rich forests as well as intricate caves. The region is quite hilly, and is cut through by the Dordogne and Vézère rivers, which provide nearby activities like canoeing. Turenne station has rail connections to Brive-la-Gaillarde, Aurillac and Rodez.

== Demographics ==
Historical population
Year	Pop.	±% p.a.
1968	705	—
1975	699	−0.12%
1982	718	+0.38%
1990	740	+0.38%
1999	742	+0.03%
2007	791	+0.80%
2012	793	+0.05%
2017	838	+1.11%
2023	801	−0.75%
Source: INSEE

== Economy ==
The local economy is primarily agricultural, with a fair amount of tourism. The region is known for its excellent produce, including walnuts, mushrooms, truffles, and foie gras.

== Local government ==
- Yves Gary (UMP) was elected mayor in 2001 and re-elected in 2008

== Sights ==
- The tower of César (12th century) and the Clock Tower (14th century), vestiges of the former fortress.
- The church with its altar from the 17th century.
- The village, with houses from the 13th through the 17th centuries
- Several noble houses

Turenne is classified as one of The Most Beautiful Villages in France.

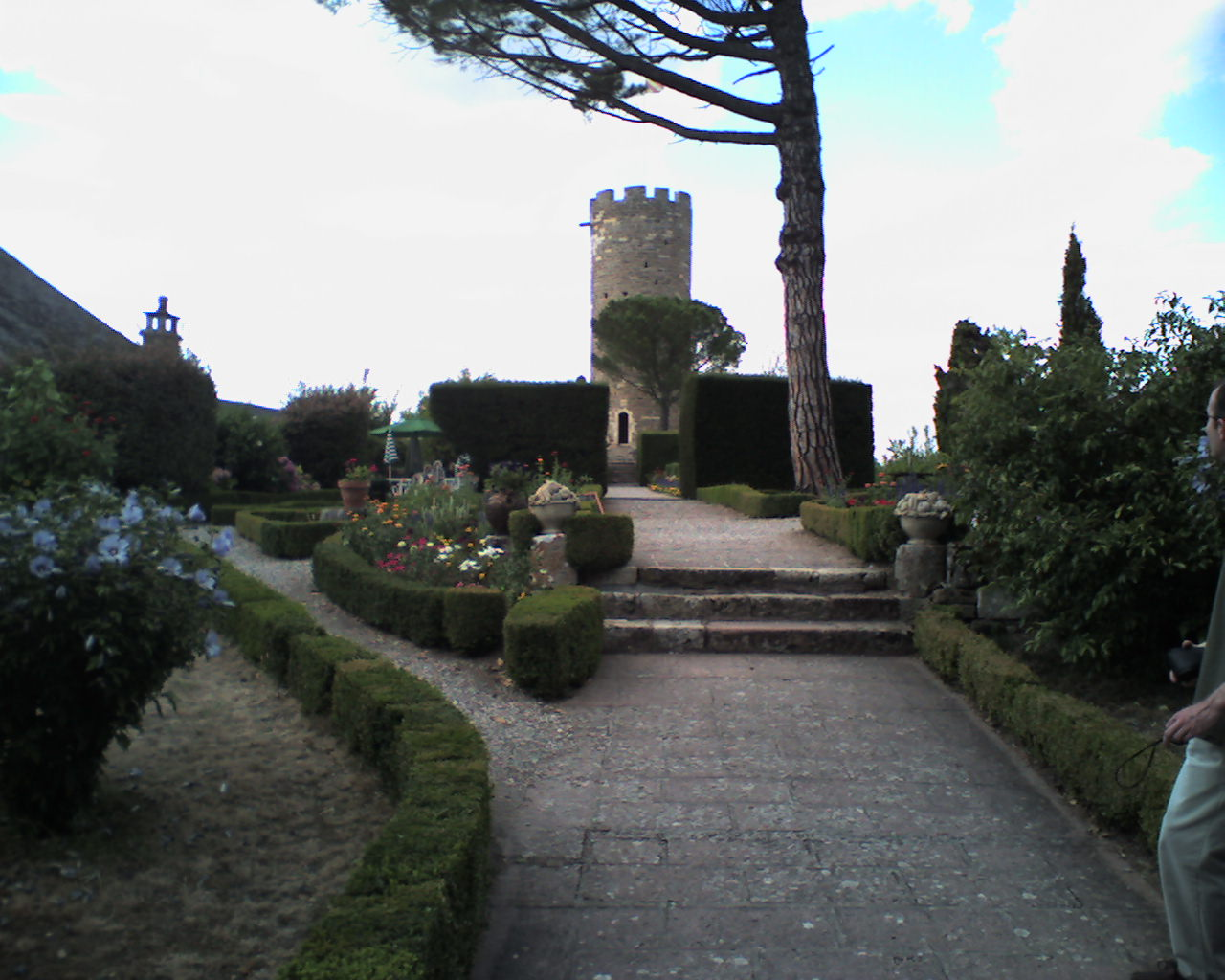
The castle of Turenne

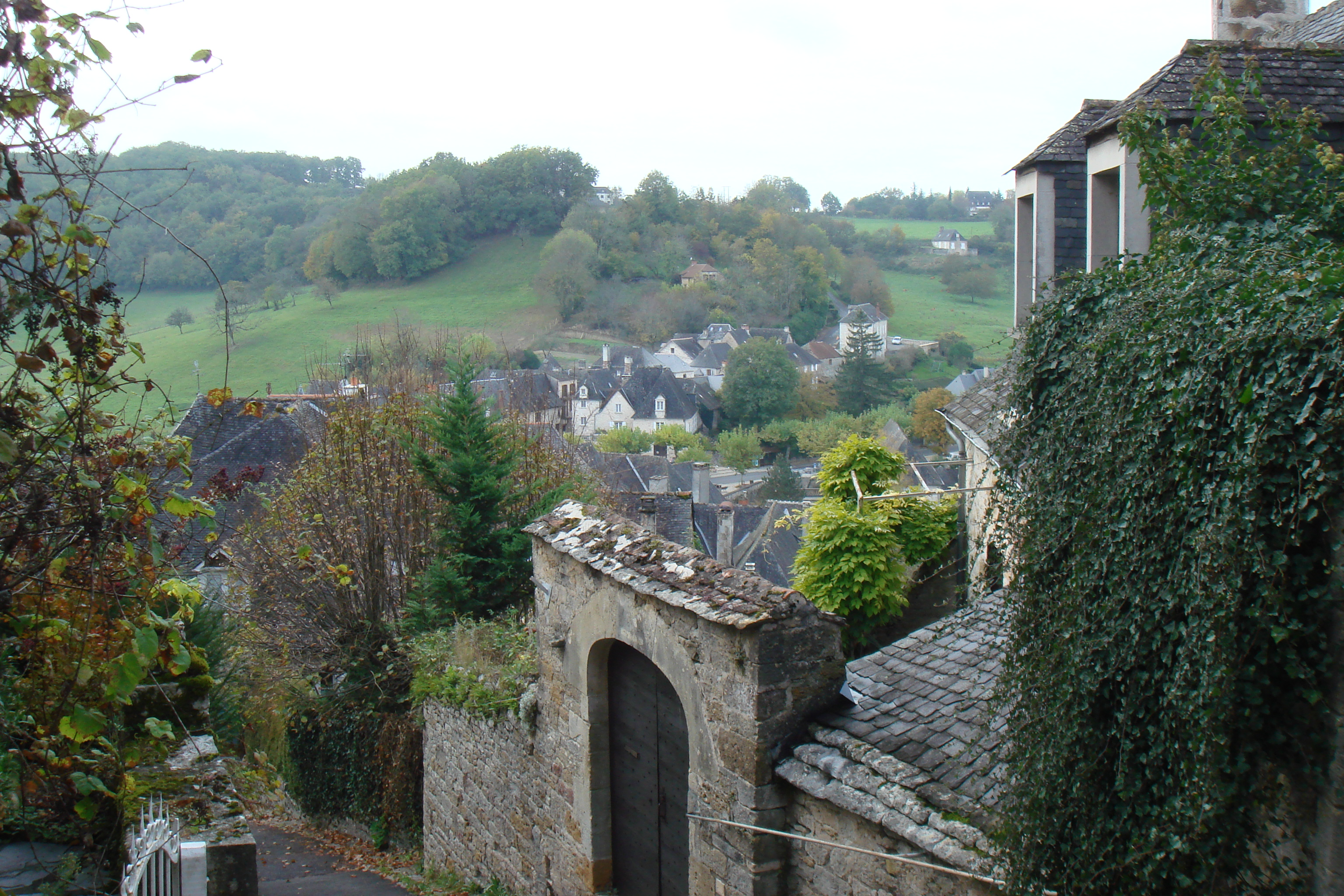
A street in Turenne

== See also ==
- Communes of the Corrèze department
