= Pierre-Barthélemy Gheusi =

French theatre director, librettist, journalist and writer

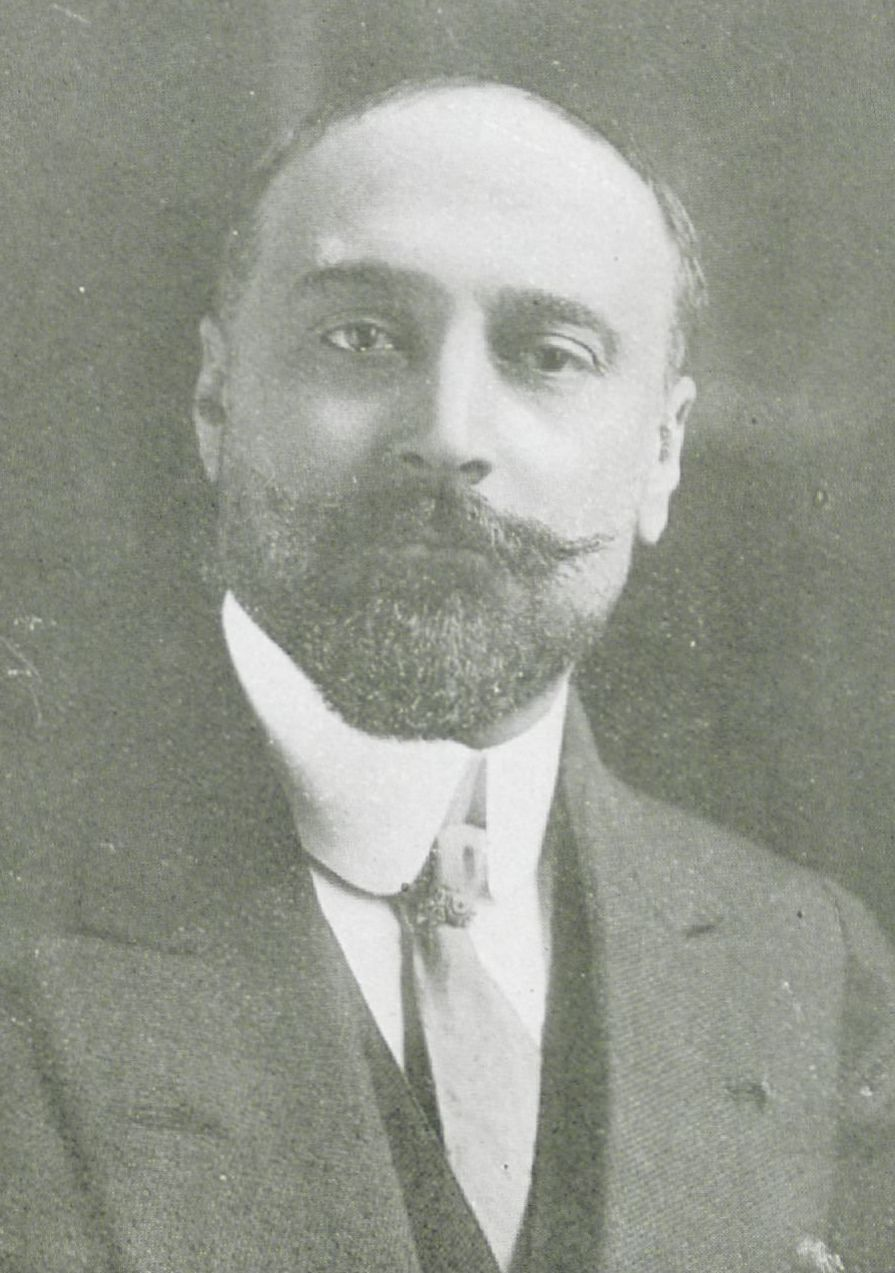
Pierre-Barthélemy Gheusi

Pierre-Barthélemy Gheusi, also known by the pseudonym Norbert Lorédan, (21 November 1865 – 30 January 1943) was a French theatre director, librettist, journalist and writer. He was born in Toulouse and died in Paris.

== Biography ==
A son of a banker and distant cousin of Gambetta, Pierre-Barthélemy Gheusi studied at the college in Castres, where he met Jean Jaurès, who was at that time a tutor there, and became a friend of the doctor and scholar François de Vesian. He went to study law in Toulouse.

In 1887–1888, at the instigation of Laurent Tailhade, Gheusi worked on the revue Le Décadent, but his literary career struggled to take off, despite the recommendations of Émile Zola and Catulle Mendès.

Gheusi was involved in republican politics and joined the electoral campaign of Jaurès in the legislative elections of 1889 in Castres. In the following years, the government called on his services from time to time. In 1897, Ernest Constans sent him on an inspection tour of Christian schools in Palestine. After a short period at the Ministère des Colonies in 1906, beside Georges Leygues (also from south west France), he was charged by Jean Cruppi, then minister of Foreign Affairs, to work in 1911 for the restoration of diplomatic relations between France and Venezuela.

In 1894, he married Adrienne Willems, nièce of the painter Florent Willems and frequented, alongside many free-thinkers and free-masons, the Luscrambo, an association which grouped the Toulousains of Paris, founded by the singer and future director of the Opéra Pedro Gailhard.

His novel Gaucher Myrian, written in collaboration with the Bordeaux intellectual and musicologist Anatole Loquin was published in 1893, and attests to his interest in catharism. In 1906, he became a member of the Eglise gnostique catholique, alongside Léonce-Eugène Fabre des Essarts and Gabriel Fauré.

In 1897, Arthur Meyer entrusted him with the direction of the illustrated literary supplement of the Gaulois which had just been created with the title Le Gaulois du dimanche. In 1899, he bought the Nouvelle Revue from Juliette Adam. Under his direction, this periodical enjoyed a particularly brilliant period.

In 1911, he acquired the castle of the Baron, Albert de L'Espée, at Ilbarritz, by Biarritz at auction, and envisaged making a golf course; the 1914 war stopped the works and he transformed the house into a hospital for repatriated injured soldiers during the First World War. He himself served as subalterne/officier d'ordonnance of Gallieni.

Pedro Gailhard had called him to serve in the direction of the Paris Opéra in 1906 and in 1914, he became director of the l'Opéra Comique, alongside Émile and Vincent Isola. He was suddenly removed in 1918 by his sworn enemy Clemenceau. After a short time running the Théâtre Lyrique du Vaudeville (1919–1920), he became editor of Figaro and soon was promoted to administrative director. He was especially entrusted by the new proprietor, François Coty, with organizing the merger with Le Gaulois in 1929, before leaving in 1932.

In that year Anatole de Monzie, Minister of Public Instruction and Beaux-Arts, nominated him again Director of the Opéra-Comique which was in a financial crisis. Gheusi used his own funds to assist the theatre, but he was forced to resign at the time of the strikes of 1936.

He died in Paris on 30 January 1943. His memoirs, Cinquante Ans de Paris, are a document on the political life under the Third Républic.

== Works of Pierre-Barthélemy Gheusi ==
Stage and opera

- La Fée aux roses, (saynète) by Norbert Lorédan, 1888
- La Veillée de Jeanne d'Arc, Scène lyrique for soprano, men's chorus and orchestra, with Ernest Lefèvre, (around 1890)
- Rayon d'onyx, Poème for the stage, 1890
- Le Carillon, opéra in 3 acts, in collaboration with J. Méry, music by J. Ulrich, Aix-en-Provence, 15 September 1895
- Damayanti, légende lyrique in 1 act, music by Lucien Fontayne, Grand-Théâtre de Marseille, 7 May 1895
- Ermessinde, opéra in 2 acts and 3 tableaux
- Guernica, drame lyrique in 3 acts, with Pedro Gailhard, music by Paul Vidal, Opéra-comique, 5 June 1895
- Carloman, drame lyrique in 3 acts, 1896
- Kermaria, idylle d'Armorique in 3 acts with a prologue, Paris Opéra-comique, 1897
- Faublas, opéra, music by Camille Erlanger, 1897
- La Cloche du Rhin, drame lyrique in 3 acts, with Georges Montorgueil, music by Samuel Rousseau, Opéra de Paris, May 1898
- Le Comte Roger, drame in 4 acts, with Édouard Noël, l'Athénée, Paris, 28 June 1900
- Le Juif Polonais, opéra 3 acts and 6 tableaux, in collaboration with Henri Cain after Erckmann-Chatrian, music by Camille Erlanger, Opéra-Comique, 11 April 1900
- Les Barbares, tragédie lyrique in 3 acts and a prologue, with Victorien Sardou, music by Camille Saint-Saëns, Opéra de Paris, 23 October 1901
- Orsola, drame lyrique in 3 acts, music by Paul and Lucien Hillemacher, Opéra de Paris, 14 May 1902
- Trilby, féerie in one act, with Charles Lomon, Comédie-Française, 1904
- Çanta, tragédie lyrique in 3 acts and 4 tableaux, after the Brahmana and the Ramayana, with J. Fonville, music by Pierre Kunc, Paris music competition. 1900–1903
- Fiorella, comédie lyrique in 1 act, with Victorien Sardou, 1905
- Chacun sa vie, comédie in 3 acts, with Gustave Guiches, Comédie-Française, 10 September 1907
- Le Miracle, drame lyrique in 5 acts, with André Mérane, music by Georges-Adolphe Hué, Opéra de Paris, 1 December 1910
- Perkain, drame lyrique in 3 acts, Basque legend after Pierre Harispe, music by Jean Poueigh, 1931

Novels

- Gaucher Myrian, vie aventureuse d'un escholier féodal. Salamanque, Toulouse et Paris au XIIIe siècle, with Paul Lavigne, 1893
- L'Âme de Jeanne Darc, roman épisodique de la guerre de cent ans, 1895
- Le Serpent de mer, roman à clés, 1899
- Montsalvat 1890–1910
- La Mamelouke, roman d'un officier de Bonaparte en Égypte et en Syrie, 1905
- Biarritz-des-Goélands, 1905
- Le Puits des âmes, 1906
- L'Opéra romanesque, 1910
- Les Pirates de l'Opéra, 1911
- Le Mascaret rouge, 1931
- Les Amours de Faublas, novel in 7 chapters after Louvet de Couvray, 1938
- La Fille de Monte-Cristo, 1948

Historical

- Gambetta, par Gambetta, lettres intimes et souvenirs de famille publiés par P.-B. Gheusi, 1909
- Gallieni 1849–1916, 1922
- La Gloire de Gallieni. Comment Paris fut sauvé. Le Testament d'un soldat, 1928
- Gallieni et Madagascar, Paris; 1931
- La Vie et la Mort singulières de Gambetta, 1932
- Le Roman de Gambetta, 1938
- La Vie prodigieuse du maréchal Gallieni, 1939

Other

- Quelques pages d'un vieil album, 1889
- Le Blason héraldique, manuel nouveau de l'art héraldique, de la science du blason et de la polychromie féodale, d'après les règles du moyen âge, 1892
- Simplement, poèmes, 1895
- Midi. Silhouettes : E. Barbey, Constans, Gailhard, Gallieni, Mgr Gazaniol, Jean Jaurès, Georges Leygues, Verdi, Paul Vidal, Emma Calvé, Aïno Ackté, etc. Théâtre, paysages et légendes, de l'Opéra à la mosquée d'Omar, 1900
- Sous le volcan, 1903
- Les Atlantes, aventures de temps légendaires, with Charles Lomon, 1905
- Les Chefs, études politiques et de théâtre, 1914
- Guerre et théâtre, 1914–1918. Mémoires d'un officier du général Gallieni et journal parisien du directeur du théâtre national de l'Opéra-Comique pendant la guerre, 1919
- L'Opéra-Comique pendant la guerre, 1919
- L'Affaire de l'Opéra-Comique et l'Opéra-Comique de Lafferre, 1923
- Les Tueurs de rois, 1926
- Jeanne Myrtale. Jean Mouliérat, with Thomas Salignac, 1933
- L'Opéra-Comique sous la haine, Paris, 1937
- Cinquante ans de Paris, mémoires d'un témoin, 1889–1938, 1939, 4 volumes
- La Femme nue du Montcalm, 1945.
