= Carennac =

- Commune
- A general view of Carennac

- Coat of arms
- Location of Carennac
- Location within France Location within Occitanie
- Coordinates: 44°55′10″N 1°43′59″E
- Country: France
- Region: Occitania
- Department: Lot
- Arrondissement: Gourdon
- Canton: Martel
- Intercommunality: Causses et Vallée de la Dordogne

Government
  - Mayor (2020–2026): Jean-Christophe Cid
- Area^{1}: 19.00 km^{2} (7.34 sq mi)
- Highest elevation: 340 m (1,120 ft)
- Lowest elevation: 110 m (360 ft)
- Population (2023): 431
  - Density: 22.7/km^{2} (58.8/sq mi)
- Demonym: Carennacois
- Time zone: UTC+01:00 (CET)
  - Summer (DST): UTC+02:00 (CEST)
- INSEE/Postal code: 46058 /46110
- Website: www.carennac.fr
- ^{1} French Land Register data, which excludes lakes, ponds, glaciers > 1 km^{2} (0.386 sq mi or 247 acres) and river estuaries.

Carennac (French pronunciation: [kaʁɛnak]) is a commune in the Lot department in Southwestern France in the historical region of Quercy. The village lies in the fertile valley of the Dordogne under the arid plateau locally named 'le Causse'.

Its landmarks include a medieval priory, combining an 11th-century church and cloister, and a 16th-century castle, in which the author of The Adventures of Telemachus, François Fénelon, lived from 1681 to 1685. The church features a tympanum, and the cloister a 15th-century "mise au tombeau".

== Toponymy ==
The toponym Carennac is based on a Gallo-Roman domain name derived from the Gallic name Caros, which became Carennus. The ending -ac comes from the Gaulish suffix -acon (itself from the common Celtic *-āko-), often Latinized as -acum in texts.

== History ==
The first written mention of the village was in 937 in the Cartulaire de Beaulieu and was known then as Carendenacus with a church dedicated to Saint Sernin. Prior to 1040, the village and church belonged to the Abbey of Beaulieu but in that year, Bernard III, Bishop of Cahors, bequeathed the town and its church to the Abbey of Cluny and they founded its priory and a Romanesque church dedicated to Saint-Pierre. By the 1100s, the priory was very wealthy and had numerous possessions. In 1295, Pope Boniface VIII declared that the priory would be elevated to a deanery. The deans would be appointed from noble Limousin and Quercy families.

The town and the priory's wealth and buildings would suffer hardships throughout the Hundred Years War between the English and the French, with the Romanesque cloister damaged at the end of the 1300s. The priory and cloister were repaired at the end of the 1400s but the priory had lost much of its wealth and possessions.

During the French Wars of Religion between Catholic and Protestant France, the deanery was sacked in 1562 by the Protestant forces of Bessonies and Marchastel.

The Château des Doyens, built in the sixteenth century. In 1605, a papal bull by Paul V, awarded the deanery at Carennac as a benefice to Louis de Salignac de la Mothe-Fenelon and it remained in the family until 1771. From 1681 to 1685 it was the deanery of François de Salignac de la Mothe-Fénelon, known as Fénelon, a future Archbishop of Cambrai, and who wrote Les Aventures de Télémaque.

By 1788, when the priory was abolished by the King's Council and a papal bull, only two monks remained, then living in the deanery. When the French Revolution began in 1789, Carennac was still a fiefdom of the dean of the abbey, who collect taxes, tolls, and administered justice to the village and its surrounding territory. The villages nobility and clergy accepted the outcome of the revolution, and the villagers took the oath of allegiance to the state, in the cloister, on 15 July 1790, the Fête de la Fédération. By 1792 however, some of the villages nobility were imprisoned by the state at Martel, and the state attempted to close parish church.

After the revolution, the municipality lost control of the priory's buildings as they were sold as national asset to eleven residents. The state repurchased some of the property between 1911 and 1912 and so began restoration work.

== Local culture and heritage ==
=== Places and monuments ===
The village of Carennac developed from the eleventh century, after the foundation of a priory-deanery, of the Order of Cluny. Nestled along the fortifications of the monastery, Carennac retains many aspects of the Middle Ages. Its Saint-Pierre church is a Romanesque building with a twelfth century tympanum. Its cloister, rebuilt in the fifteenth century after the Hundred Years' War, houses in its chapter house the Entombment, a sculpture from the end of the fifteenth century.

In the sixteenth century, the construction of the Château des Doyens was carried out with its façade in white local stone, mullioned windows, sculpted dormers. The castle is one of the elements of the priory-dean of Carennac, built in the sixteenth century to be a prestigious dwelling of the dean. Rooms and galleries are organized on four levels around a wide and imposing staircase.

=== Enclosure ===
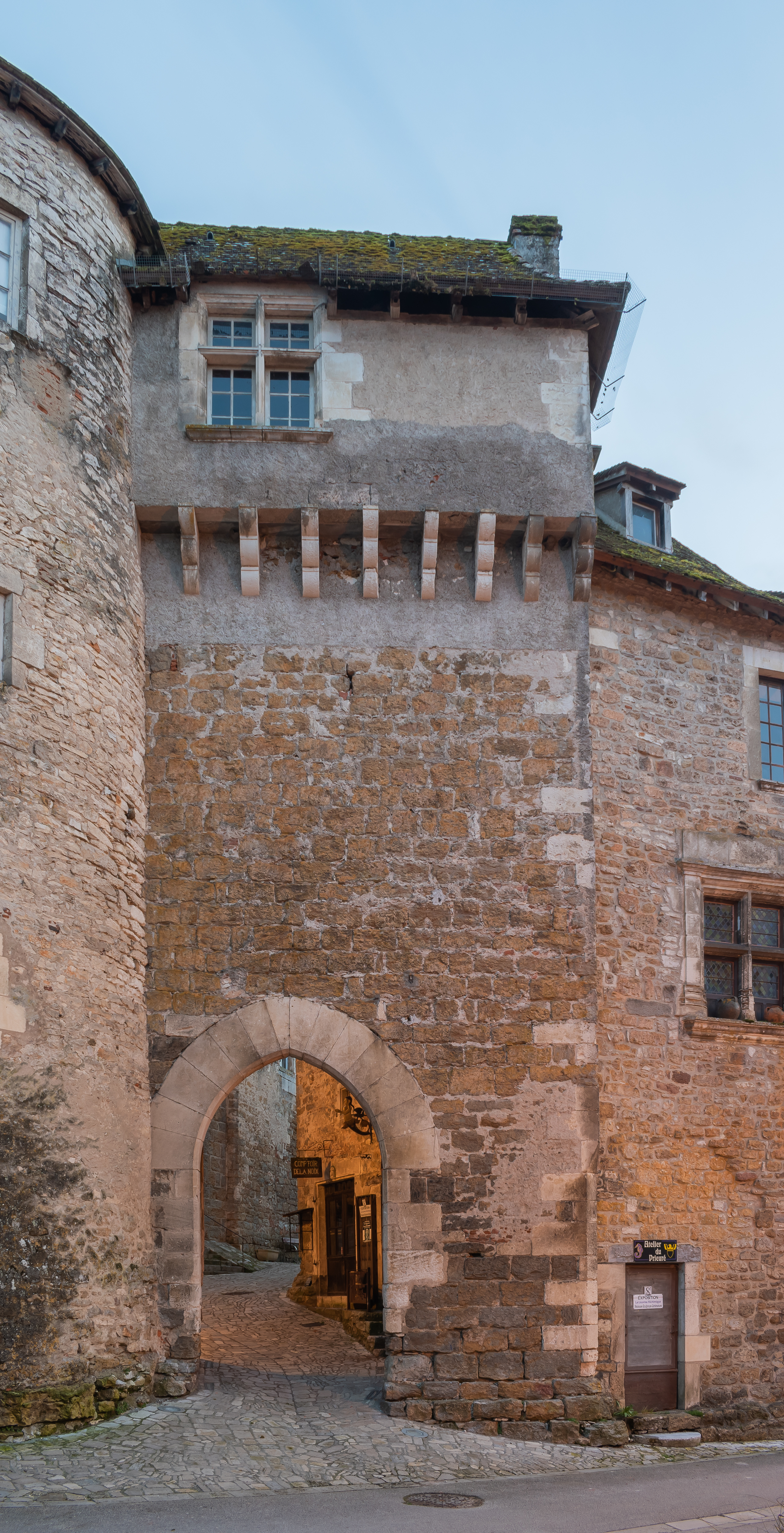
Entrance to the enclosure

Large gallery was built over the church's chapel's and led to terraced gardens. Parts of 14th century enclosure remain, the northern side, a round tower and square tower with oratory. The eastern side, large walls, while along the western wall, outbuildings and the fortified gate to the priory. The palisade, now a road and parking area separate the enclosure from the Dordogne.

The castle now houses the heritage area of the land of art and history of the Dordogne valley. It presents a permanent exhibition with free access, which allows you to discover the natural, heritage and architectural richness of this country labelled "Country of Art and History" by the Ministry of Culture. The Château des Doyens was classified as a historical monument on 2 February 1938.

=== Château des Doyens ===
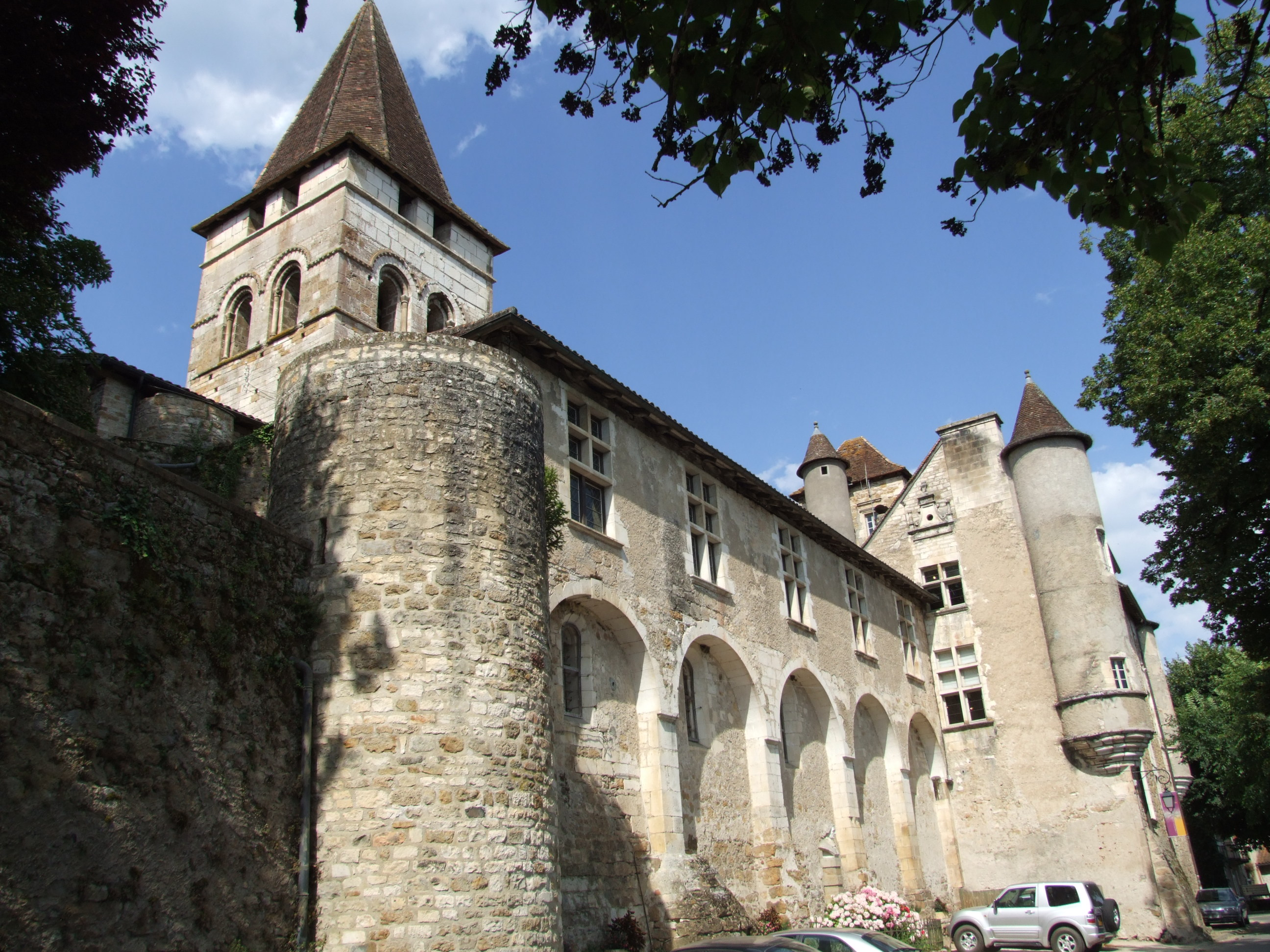
Chateau from the old palisade

The Château des Doyens is a quadrilateral of 20 m by 10 m, dating from the fifteenth century, it is a private residence, built of dressed stone, comprising, with the attic, three floors of apartments. A spiral staircase leads to the entire height of the building. On the first floor is the ceremonial room, the best preserved at the moment. The seventeenth-century ceiling with protruding beams is painted with foliage, flowers, baskets and various mythological subjects.

=== L'église Saint-Pierre de Carennac ===
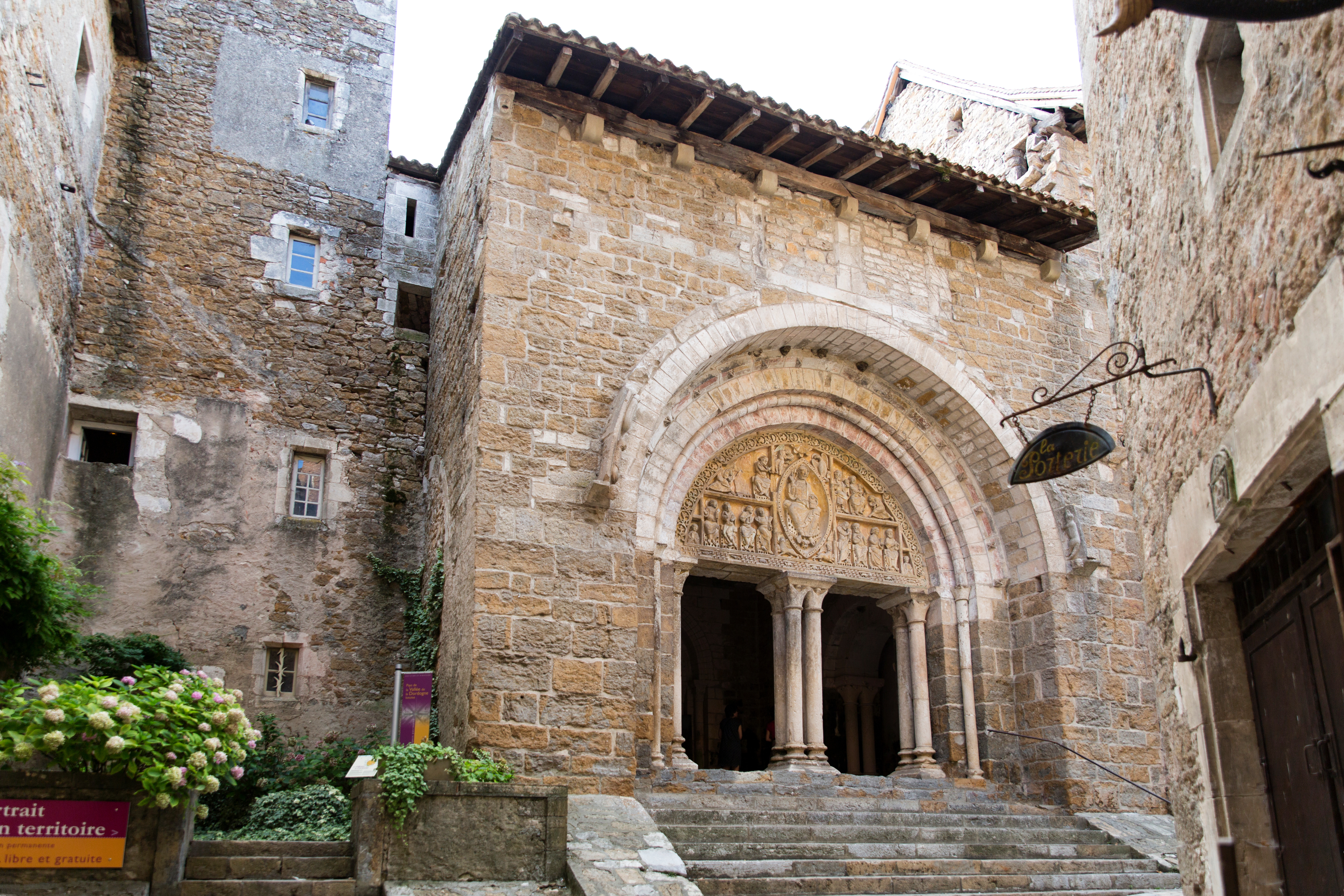
Church entrance

The church of Saint-Pierre is a Romanesque construction from the end of the eleventh century augmented in the middle of the twelfth century by a porch decorated with a sculpted tympanum. This tympanum rests laterally on a cluster of four columns acting as a trumeau. It offers the gaze a symbolic vision of the end of time. Occupying the entire height of the tympanum, Christ in majesty holding the Book and blessing, is seated on a richly decorated throne. The symbols of the four evangelists surround it while the apostles, divided into two registers, contemplate the heavenly vision.

The church has three naves separated by thick pillars, plus a row of chapels on the north side. It has about thirty capitals sculpted with interlacing and palmettes. A square Romanesque bell tower rises above the crossing of the transept. A Tale of the Three Dead and the Three Living, a mural depiction showing three young gentlemen being arrested in a cemetery by three dead people, who remind them of the brevity of life and the importance of the salvation of their souls. The church of Saint-Pierre was classified as a historical monument by a decree of 2 May 1893.

==== Mise au Tombeau ====
This stone carving of the burial of Jesus, originally at the bottom of the church's nave, now in the cloister, dates from the end of the sixteenth century. It is characterized by the painful expression of the life-size figures, at the centre of which is the Virgin Mary in grief, supported by Saint John, Mary, wife of Cleophas, Mary Salome praying and Mary Magdalene weeping. Christ, whose face is imbued with gentleness, is stretched out on a stone table. The shroud is supported by Joseph of Arimathea, on the right, and Nicodemus, on the left, the two disciples who detached the body of Christ from the Cross and buried him.

==== Cloister ====
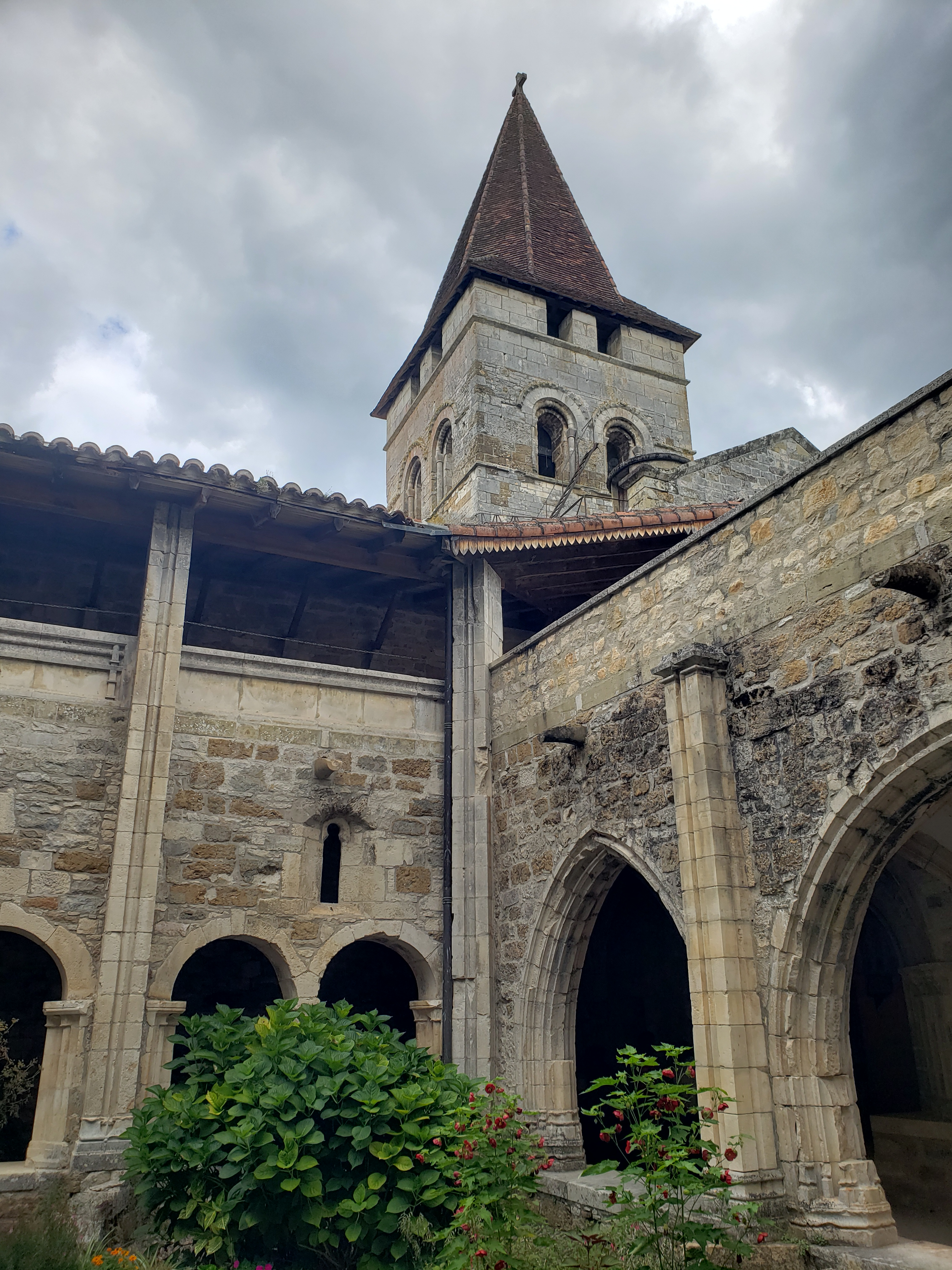
Priory cloister

A place of meditation for the monks, it consists of two parts from different time periods, the part adjoining the Romanesque church at its northern side, with its twin bay's, dates from the end of the eleventh century. The other three galleries were built in the flamboyant Gothic style at the end fifteenth century. Each gallery is opened by tracery windows. There is the chapter house, where the monks met, which was remodelled at several times, before being used as a cistern for almost two centuries. It has recently been restored and houses a late 15th century Entombment, 15th century bas-reliefs depicting the Passion of Christ, and a series of more popular statues of saints. The cloister was classified as a historical monument on 18 April 1914.

=== Listed or listed houses ===
- The house adjoining the fortified gate of the castle (of the former priory) by decree of 2 February 1938.
- A house whose sixteenth century fireplace is listed by a decree of 21 October 1925.

=== Other heritage ===
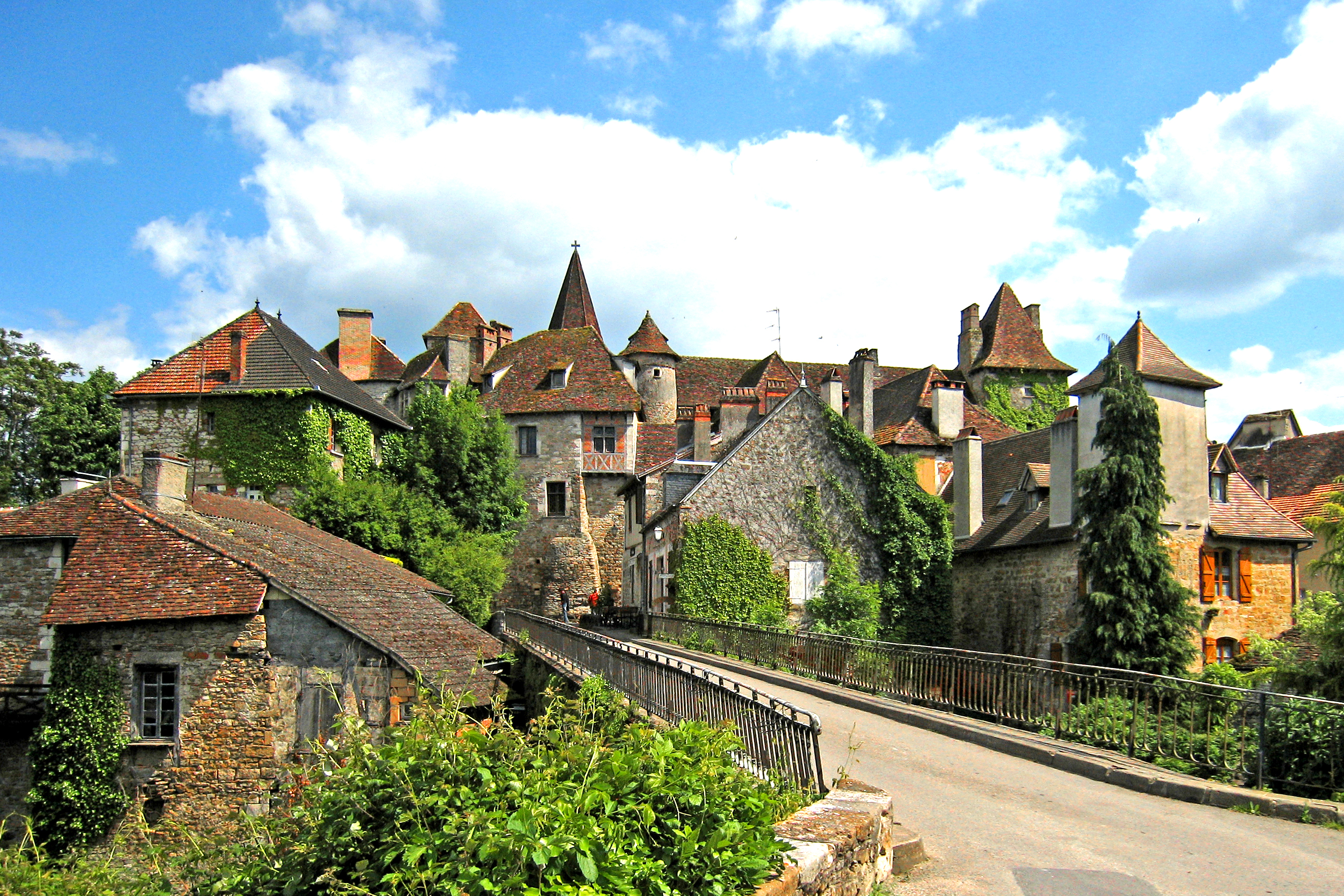
Village

The village of Carennac retains many houses from the fifteenth and sixteenth centuries. There is also a sixteenth century stair tower, located not far from a bridge over the Mederic river, facing the Île de Calypso.

- Dolmen des Igues de Magnagues: 44° 53′ 12" N, 1° 43′ 53" E
- Dolmens du Noutary: 2 dolmens; Dolmen no. 1 is a vestibule dolmen with a very large table (4 metres long and 2.30 metres wide) dug into the surface of a small basin (0.40 metres in diameter and 0.28 metres deep). 44° 54′ 09" N, 1° 42′ 31" E 44° 54′ 23" N, 1° 42′ 23" E.
- Église Saint-Laurent de Magnagues.
- Chapelle Notre-Dame de Carennac.

== Activities ==
Carennac is a member of Les Plus Beaux Villages de France (The Most Beautiful Villages of France) Association (along with 148 others, including neighbouring Loubressac, Autoire, Curemonte and Turenne). The summer months are warm and dry, with temperatures averaging 30°.

== Surroundings and access ==
A few kilometres from the village are the Gouffre de Padirac (caves) and Rocamadour (pilgrimage) sites. Other landmarks are the Château de Castelnau-Bretenoux, the Castle of Montal and the prehistoric caves of Lacave and Presque. Further on, Sarlat-la-Canéda, Brive-la-Gaillarde, Cahors and Aurillac are regional hubs. The A20 motorway (linking Paris to Toulouse and Spain) lies 30 km (19 mi) away from Carennac. The closest railway station is 4 km (2.5 mi) away, in Bétaille.

== See also ==
- Communes of the Lot department
- In writing: At Home in France by Ann Barry.
- On film: French TV drama La Rivière Espérance (1997), shot in Carennac and depicting the changes brought about by the introduction of railroad in the 19th century.
