= Saint Géry-Vers =

- Commune
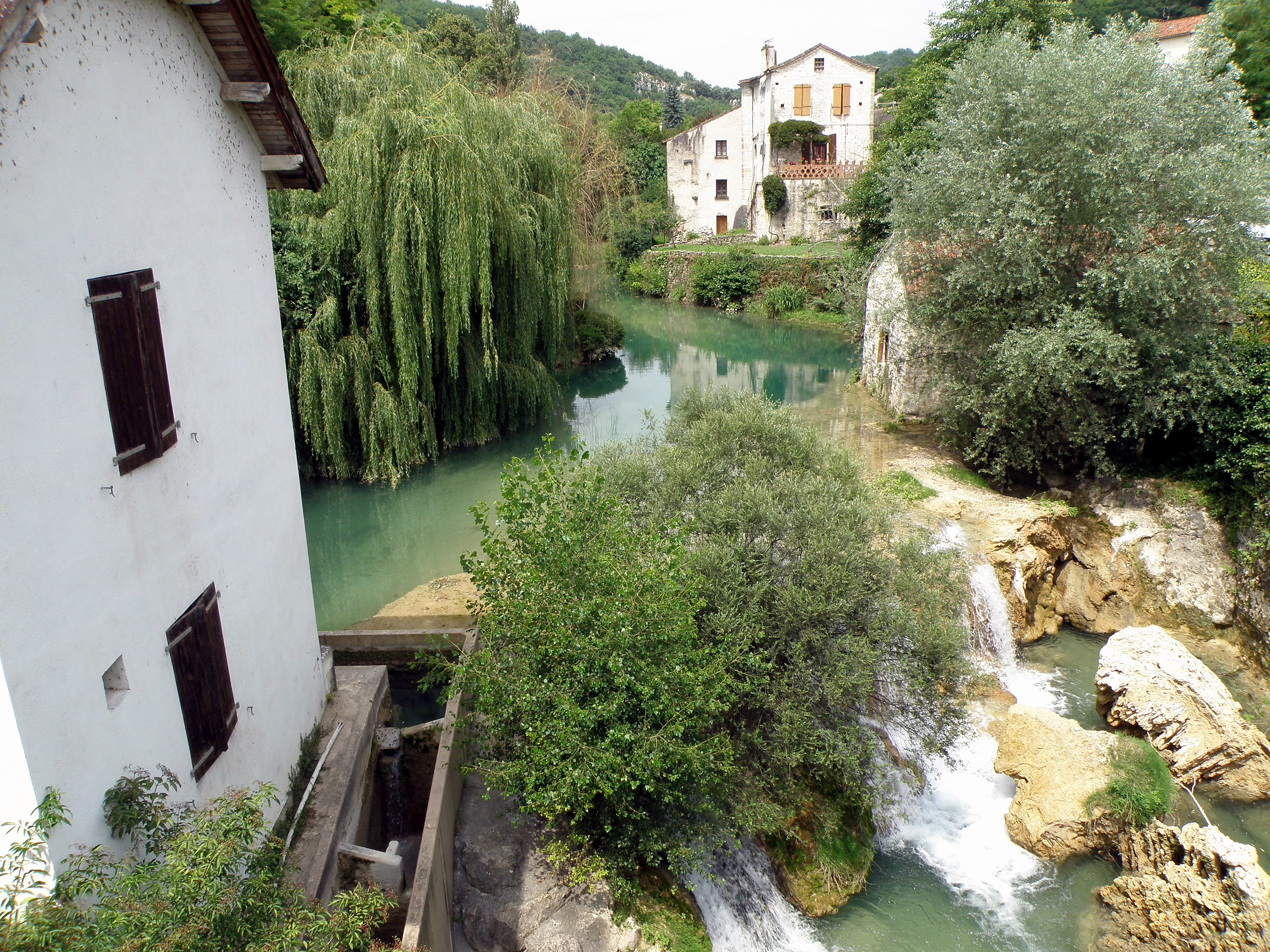
- Mill and waterfall on the Vers river
- Location of Saint Géry-Vers
- Location within France Location within Occitanie
- Coordinates: 44°28′44″N 1°34′55″E
- Country: France
- Region: Occitania
- Department: Lot
- Arrondissement: Cahors
- Canton: Causse et Vallées
- Intercommunality: CA Grand Cahors
- Area^{1}: 31.52 km^{2} (12.17 sq mi)
- Population (2023): 910
  - Density: 29/km^{2} (75/sq mi)
- Time zone: UTC+01:00 (CET)
  - Summer (DST): UTC+02:00 (CEST)
- INSEE/Postal code: 46268 /46090, 46330
- ^{1} French Land Register data, which excludes lakes, ponds, glaciers > 1 km^{2} (0.386 sq mi or 247 acres) and river estuaries.

Saint Géry-Vers (Languedocien: Sent Juèli e Vèrn) is a commune in the southern French department of Lot. The municipality was established on 1 January 2017 by merger of the former communes of Saint-Géry (the seat) and Vers.

== See also ==
- Communes of the Lot department
