= Saint-Géry, Lot =

Saint-Géry
- Part of Saint Géry-Vers
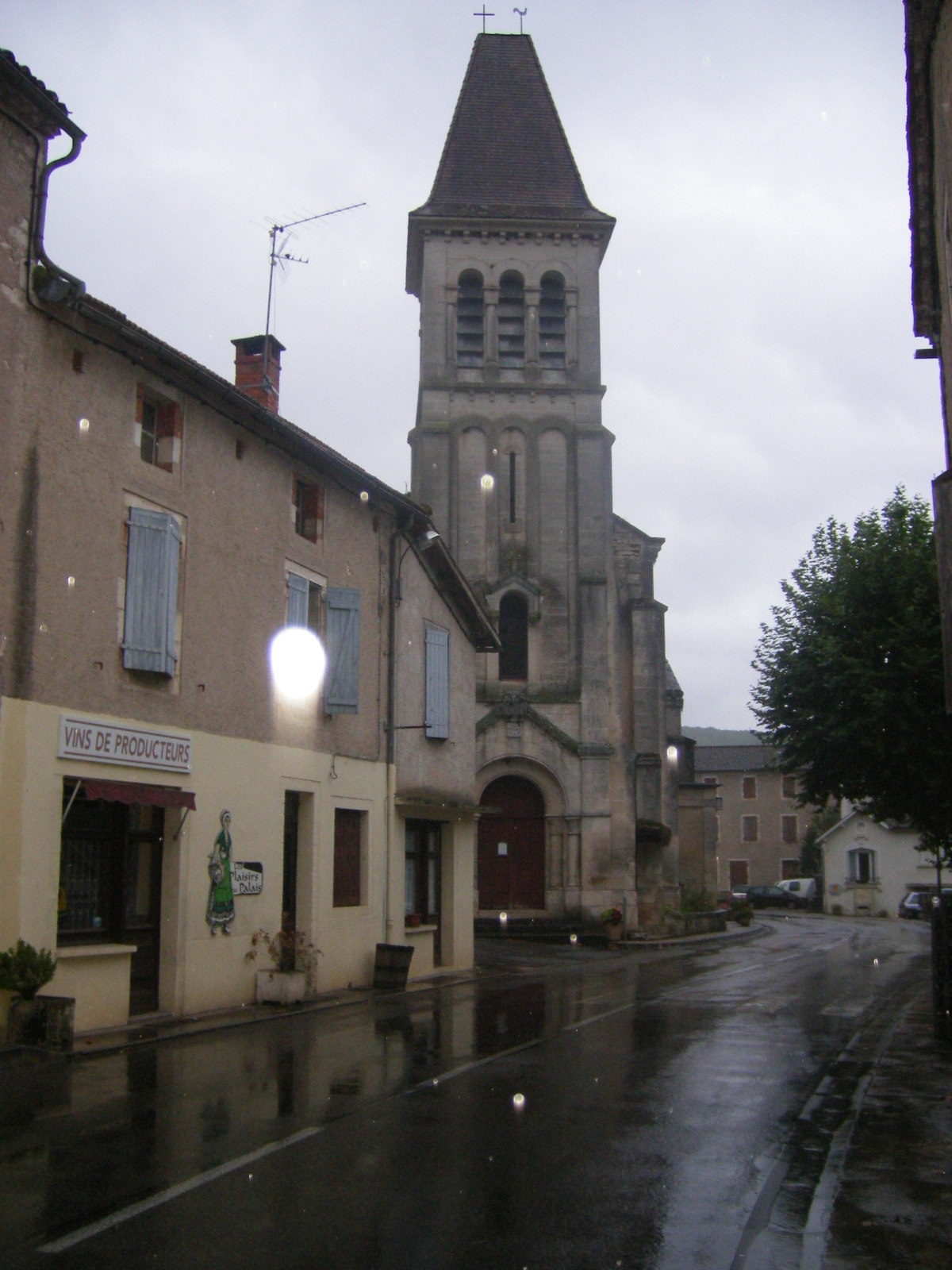
- The church of Saint-Géry
- Location of Saint-Géry
- Location within France Location within Occitanie
- Coordinates: 44°28′46″N 1°34′55″E
- Country: France
- Region: Occitania
- Department: Lot
- Arrondissement: Cahors
- Canton: Causse et Vallées
- Commune: Saint Géry-Vers
- Area^{1}: 13.58 km^{2} (5.24 sq mi)
- Elevation: 132 m (433 ft)
- Highest elevation: 348 m (1,142 ft)
- Lowest elevation: 120 m (390 ft)
- Population (2022): 447
  - Density: 32.9/km^{2} (85.3/sq mi)
- Time zone: UTC+01:00 (CET)
  - Summer (DST): UTC+02:00 (CEST)
- Postal code: 46330
- ^{1} French Land Register data, which excludes lakes, ponds, glaciers > 1 km^{2} (0.386 sq mi or 247 acres) and river estuaries.

Saint-Géry (Languedocien: Sent Juèli) is a former commune in the Lot department in south-western France. On 1 January 2017, it was merged into the new commune Saint Géry-Vers.

== See also ==
- Communes of the Lot department
