= Vers, Lot =

Vers
- Part of Saint Géry-Vers
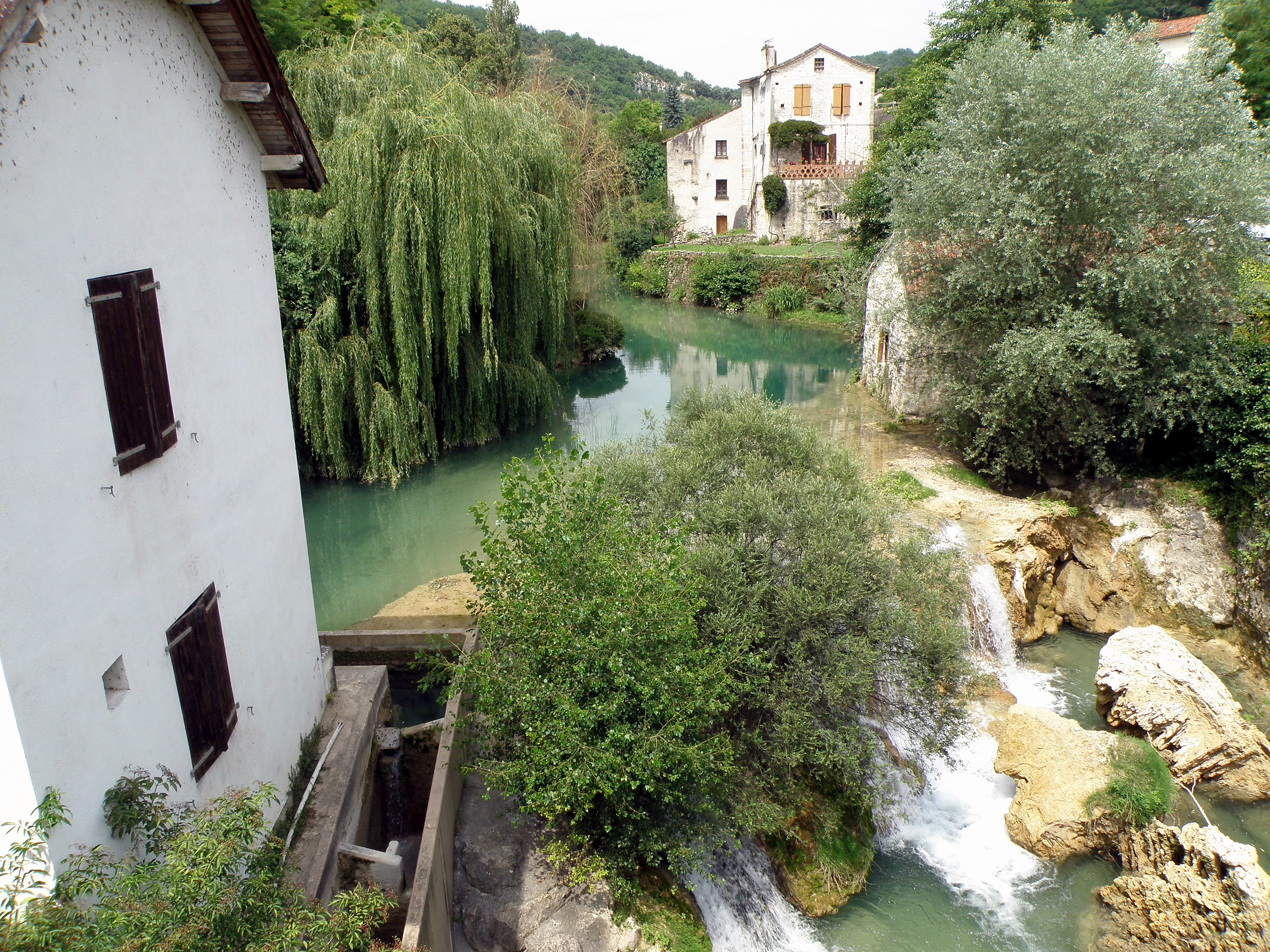
- The watermill and waterfall on the Vers river
- Location of Vers
- Location within France Location within Occitanie
- Coordinates: 44°29′12″N 1°33′15″E
- Country: France
- Region: Occitania
- Department: Lot
- Arrondissement: Cahors
- Canton: Cahors-2
- Commune: Saint Géry-Vers
- Area^{1}: 17.94 km^{2} (6.93 sq mi)
- Elevation: 129 m (423 ft)
- Highest elevation: 351 m (1,152 ft)
- Lowest elevation: 110 m (360 ft)
- Population (2022): 465
  - Density: 25.9/km^{2} (67.1/sq mi)
- Time zone: UTC+01:00 (CET)
  - Summer (DST): UTC+02:00 (CEST)
- Postal code: 46090
- ^{1} French Land Register data, which excludes lakes, ponds, glaciers > 1 km^{2} (0.386 sq mi or 247 acres) and river estuaries.

Vers (Languedocien: Vèrn) is a former commune in the Lot department in south-western France. On 1 January 2017, it was merged into the new commune Saint Géry-Vers. Its population was 465 in 2022.

The singer Jean Mouliérat (1853 – 1932) was born in Vers.

== See also ==
- Communes of the Lot department

== Gallery ==
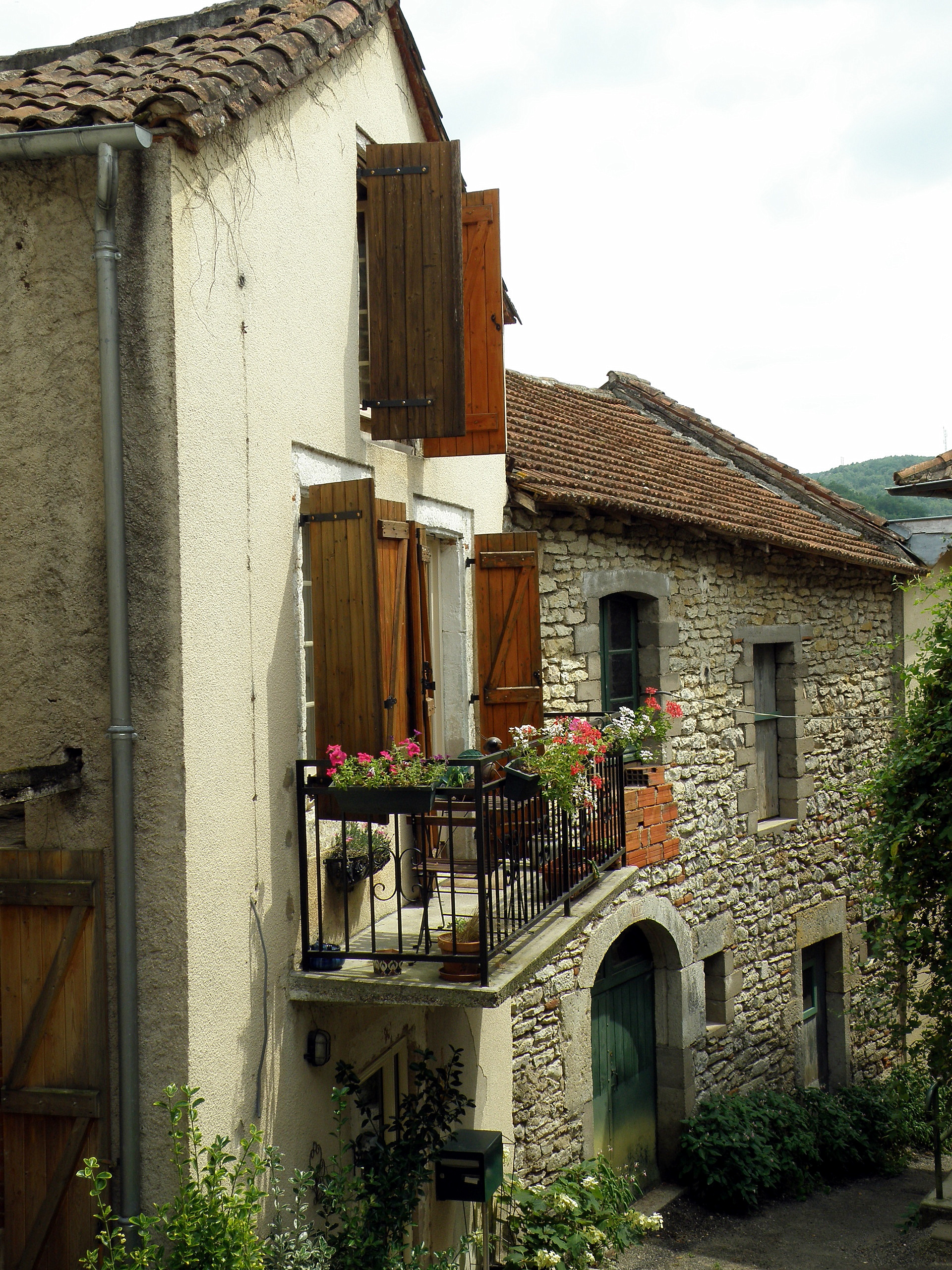
The village of Vers, Lot

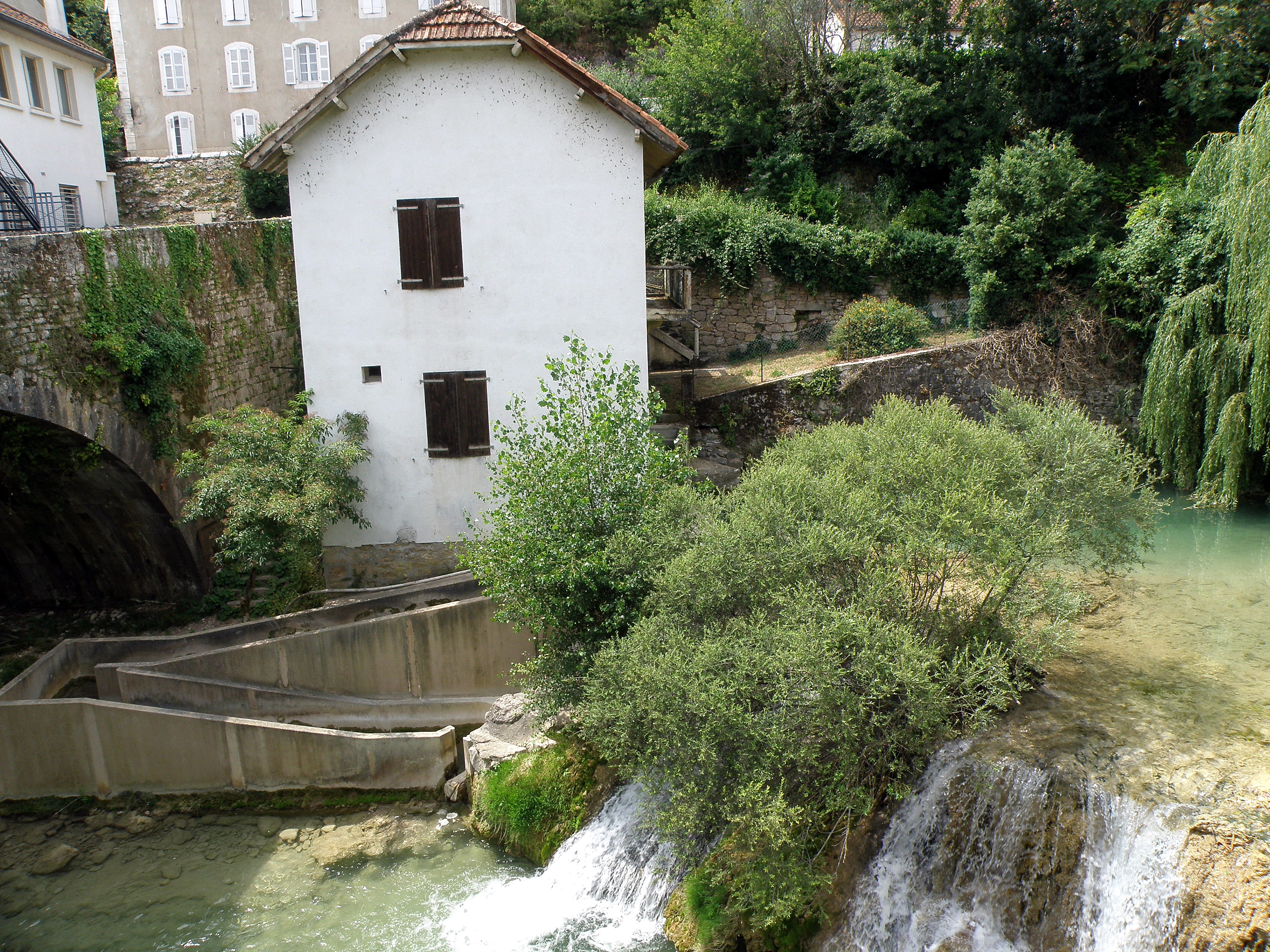
Watermill on the river Vers in Vers

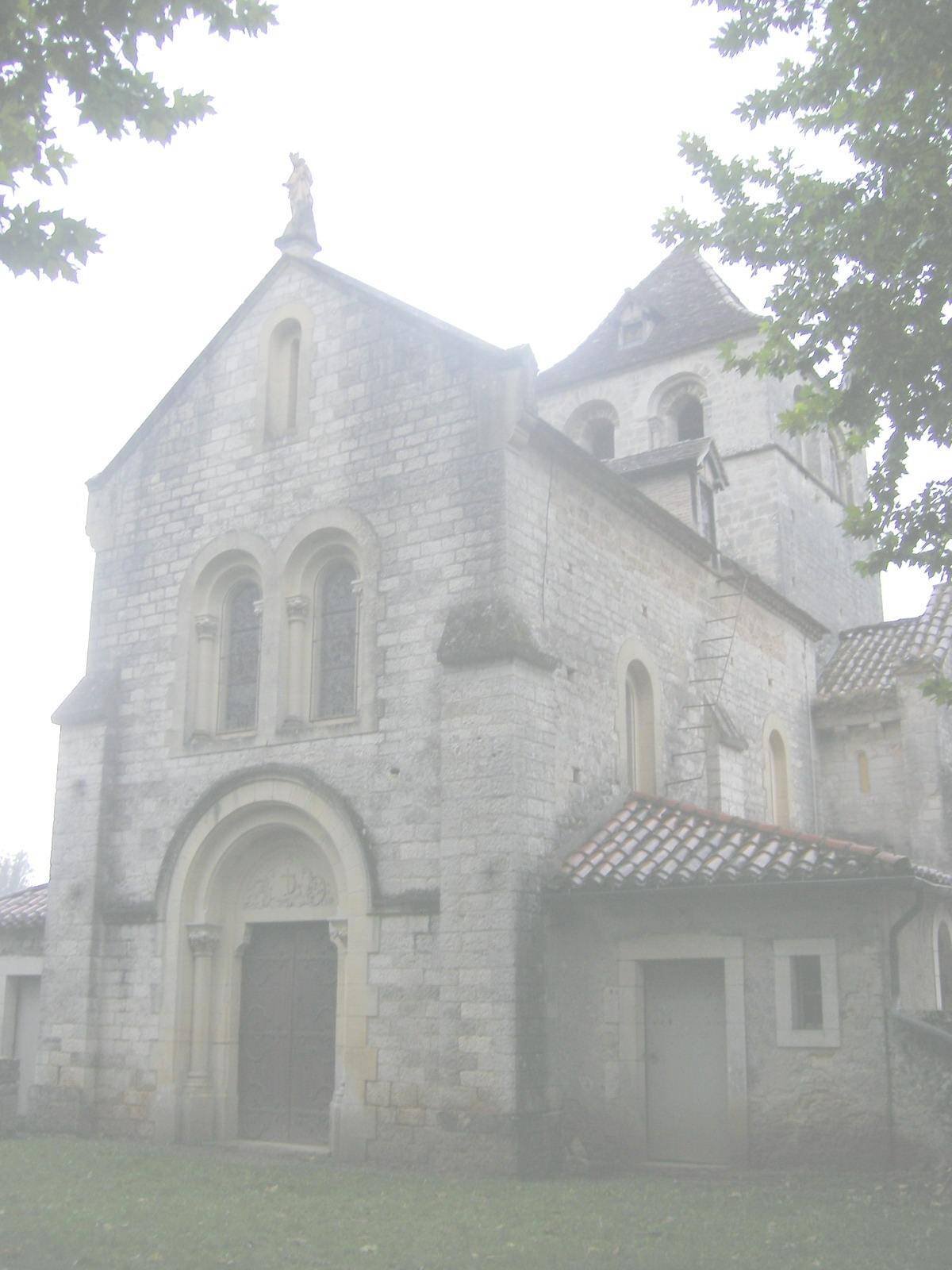
Church Notre-Dame-de-Vêles
