= Loubressac =

- Commune
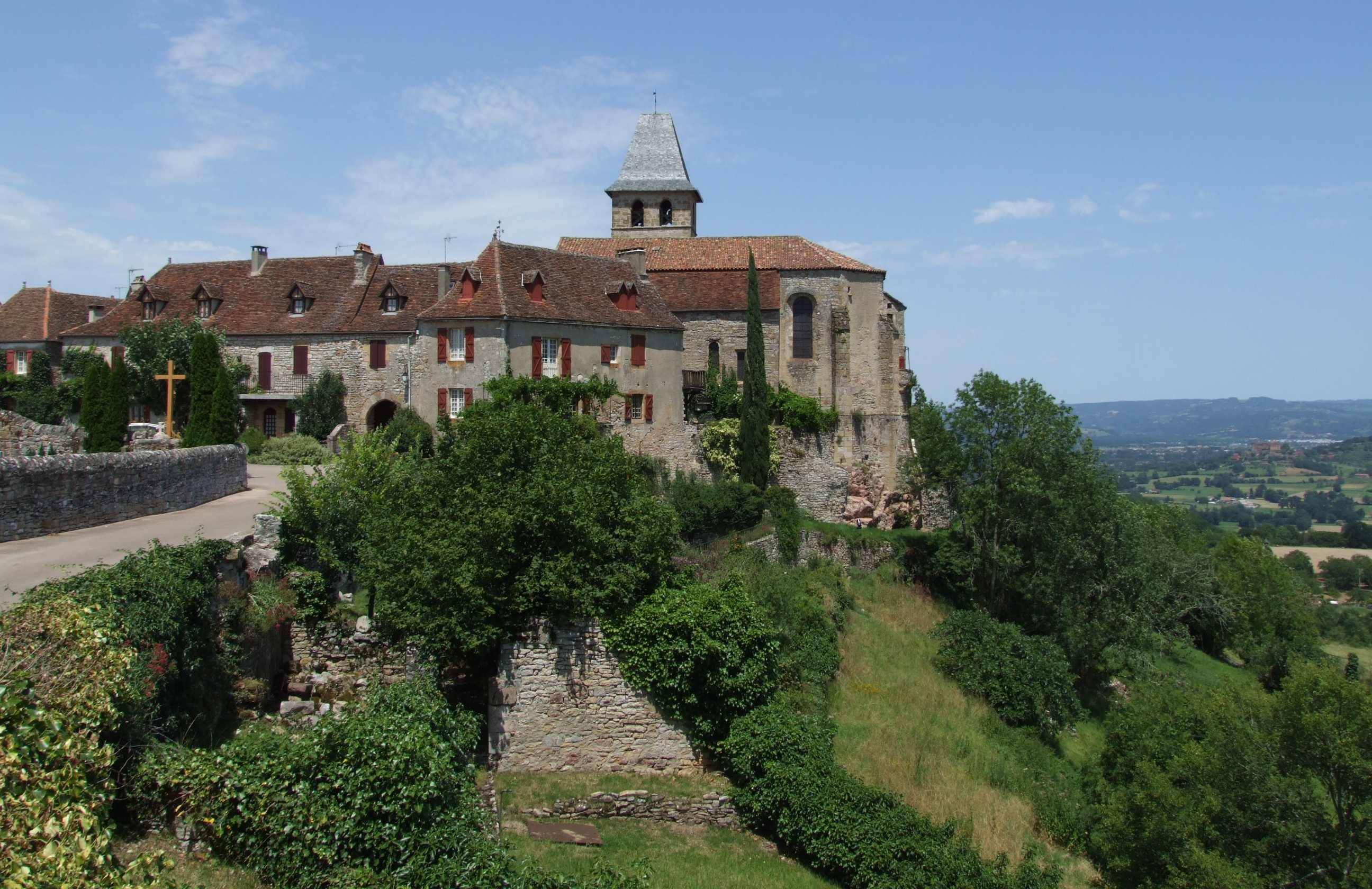
- A general view of Loubressac
- Location of Loubressac
- Location within France Location within Occitanie
- Coordinates: 44°52′19″N 1°48′14″E
- Country: France
- Region: Occitania
- Department: Lot
- Arrondissement: Figeac
- Canton: Saint-Céré

Government
  - Mayor (2020–2026): Antoine Beco
- Area^{1}: 23.75 km^{2} (9.17 sq mi)
- Elevation: 375 m (1,230 ft)
- Highest elevation: 424 m (1,391 ft)
- Lowest elevation: 120 m (390 ft)
- Population (2023): 533
  - Density: 22.4/km^{2} (58.1/sq mi)
- Time zone: UTC+01:00 (CET)
  - Summer (DST): UTC+02:00 (CEST)
- INSEE/Postal code: 46177 /46130
- ^{1} French Land Register data, which excludes lakes, ponds, glaciers > 1 km^{2} (0.386 sq mi or 247 acres) and river estuaries.

Loubressac (French pronunciation: [lubʁəsak]; Occitan: Laubreçac) is a commune in the Lot department in south-western France. It is also in the Causse de Gramat, the largest and wildest of the four Causses du Quercy. Its inhabitants are called Loubressacois or Loubressacoises.

== Toponymy ==
The toponym Loubressac, of Gallo-Roman origin, is based on an anthroponym Lupercius. The ending -ac comes from the Gallic suffix -acon (itself from Common Celtic *-āko-), often Latinized to -acum in texts.

== History ==
The village has its origins as a Gallo-Roman fundus (farm estate), situated on the hillside below the current village at l'Eglise Basse. The old village was a domain of a feudal lord around the year 900, in the territory of Count Gerald of Aurillac.

The current village moved to its cliffside location and became a castrum (fortified installation) with a feudal lord under the control of the Barons of Castelnau and Gramat and later the Viscounts of Turenne. In 1363, it became the Barony of Loubressac under Adhémar d'Aigrefeuille, cousin to Pope Clement VI and a field marshal in the papal court. His liege lord was the Viscount of Turenne, and he built the castle and its walls at its current location. The castle and its buildings were modified many times by various family ownerships. Prior to the current church, there was a chapel built by Hugeus I de Castelnau, but replaced by the existing church which built by 1520, by the Gontaur d'Oriole family.

During the Hundred Years' War (1337-1453), under the protection of the Viscount of Turenne, Loubressac was not devastated like other regions of Quercy and the lower Limousin, as the viscount was aligned for some time with the English forces under the Black Prince, having recognised the rights of the King of England in Aquitaine.

Now the possession of the Faudos family, in 1517, Catherine de Faudos married Antoine de Rochechouart of the d'Espagne-Comminges family. Jeanne‑Germaine d’Espagne, Lady of Saisses, would marry Henri de Noailles in 1578, bringing the chateau as a dowry. Jean III de Gontaud d'Oriole bought the barony from the Noailles family in 1601. During the French Wars of Religion (1562-1598), Loubressac found itself, for a time, in the protestant territory of Viscount Henri de Turenne. Jean Dupuy, from Cahors, was the judge of Loubressac in 1616. Jean-François de Tournier, Count de Vaillac, bought the barony in 1704 and by 1738, the Viscounty of Turenne's control of the territory of Loubressac ended with its sale of the viscounty to King Louis XV.

The last baron was Raphaël-François de Tournier guillotined on the 6 July 1794 during the French Revolution. In 1790, the commune appointed its first mayor, Pierre Certain. After the revolution, the chateau was owned by a General Soulié and occupied by his daughter.

In the early 1900's, writer and playwright Henri Lavedan began the restoration of the chateau. He was made aware of the chateau by Jean Mouliérat, who was restoring Château de Castelnau-Bretenoux. He restored the building and its furnishings in a mixture common of his time of medieval, neo‑Romanesque, neo‑Gothic, and neo‑Renaissance styles.

On 14 July 1944, during Operation Cadillac, the largest parachute drop of weapons (558 containers) for the French Resistance took place in the commune, on a field at La Maresque, operated by 75 B-17 Flying Fortresses accompanied by 200 fighters.

During this operation, four hundred men were stationed around the field, while six hundred men of l'Armée secrete de Corrèze protected it in the north. Two hundred men, with forty-seven oxcarts and thirty trucks, were on the ground. By 6 p.m., five hundred containers had been recovered and taken to various depots.

== Geography ==
A commune of Quercy, the old fortified village stands at the top of a rocky peak overlooking the left bank of the Bave river.

== Local culture and heritage ==
=== Places and monuments ===
- Église Saint-Jean-Baptiste de Loubressac - The building was listed as a historical monument in 1971. Several objects are referenced in the Base Palissy database.
- Former Church of Saint-Jean-Baptiste de Loubressac - Only two walls remain of the old church. Possibly from 1400's, may have been destroyed during the French Wars of Religion.
- Château de Loubressac (private) - from the park, you can enjoy a panorama of the Dordogne valley and the Château de Castelnau-Bretenoux.
- Pont de Maday - The bridge is located on the Cami Roumieu (Way of Saint James), a route from Clermont-Ferrand and Le Puy-en-Velay taking pilgrims' to Rocamadour. It has three arches, one dating from 1300's while the other two were rebuilt in 1725.
- Dolmen d'Horaste
- Dolmen de la Croix Hélène.
- Dolmens of Pech Plumet: 2 dolmens.

=== Green spaces ===
Loubressac has been rewarded with two flowers label in the competition, Concours des villes et villages fleuris

=== Personalities linked to the commune ===
The American poet Sylvia Plath (1932-1963) wrote Stars over the Dordogne during her stay at Lacam de Loubressac in the summer of 1961.

=== Miscellaneous ===
- The film, Quelques messieurs trop tranquilles, directed by Georges Lautner, was shot mainly in the village of Loubressac in 1972, and released in theatres on 25 January 1973.
- Loubressac received the label, of one of the most beautiful villages in France by the Les Plus Beaux Villages de France association.

== See also ==
- Communes of the Lot department
