= Anatole Loquin =

French musicologist

Anatole Loquin (1834 in Orléans – 1903) was a French writer, comptroller of Customs and musicologist. He also wrote under the pseudonyms Paul Lavigne, Louis Sévin et Ubalde.

Author of numerous theoretical works of music, Loquin defended with great ardor, especially at the end of his life, the thesis identifying the Man in the Iron Mask to Molière.

He was received a member of the Académie des sciences, belles-lettres et arts of Bordeaux on 3 April 1873.

== Works ==
- Rapport sur l'intonation enseignée par elle-même, Bordeaux, impr. de G. Gounouilhou, 1861
- Notions élémentaires d'harmonie moderne, Bordeaux, impr. de G. Gounouilhou, 1862
- Essai philosophique sur les principes constitutifs de la tonalité moderne, Bordeaux, P. Sauvat, Féret fils, 1864-1869, 3 vol.
- Examen de la méthode d'enseignement musical inventée à Bordeaux en 1818, par Pierre Galin, Bordeaux, Coder, Degréteau et Poujol, 1864
- (under the pseudonym Louis Sévin), Une excursion à Saint-Émilion (12, 13 juin 1865), Bordeaux, impr. de G. Gounouilhou, 1865
- (under the pseudonym de Louis Sévin), Exploration des villes englouties et ensevelies, par M. le Dr Amédé Kéridan. Résumé des conférences de Bordeaux, Bordeaux, impr. de A. Lavertujon, 1868
- Aperçu sur la possibilité d'établir une notation représentant… les successions harmoniques, Bordeaux, Féret et fils, sd (1871 ?)
- Réponse à M. Antonin Macé : les poésies de Clotilde de Surville, étude, Bordeaux, Féret et fils, 1873
- Tableau de tous les effets harmoniques de une à cinq notes inclusivement, au nombre de cinq cent soixante deux, précédé d'une table servant à trouver, de suite, la formule de composition de chaque accord et suivi de notes sur différents points d'harmonie, Bordeaux, Féret et fils, 1873
- Mon album, Bordeaux, impr. de G. Gounouilhou, 1875
- Les Mélodies populaires de la France : paroles, musique et histoire, Paris, L. Richault, 1879
- (under the pseudonym d'Ubalde), Positivisme et idéalisme, Paris, Garnier, 1883
- Le Secret du masque de fer : étude sur les dernières années de la vie de J.-B. Poquelin de Molière : 1664-1703, Bordeaux, Féret et fils et Orléans, H. Herluison, 1883
- Une révolution dans la science des accords, algèbre de l'harmonie, traité complet d'harmonie moderne, sans notes de musique ni signes équivalents, avec des nombres pour représenter les effets harmoniques et des lettres pour exprimer les mouvements de basse, Paris, L. Richault, 1884
- L'Enseignement primaire de la musique en France, Paris, L. Richault, 1885
- (under the pseudonym Paul Lavigne), La Chanson française, lettre conférence, Bordeaux, Féret et fils, 1888
- La Sulamite, one-act ballet (from the Song of Songs), music by Charles Haring, premiered at the Grand Théâtre de Bordeaux 14 February 1889
- Lettre à M. Ernest Reyer, au sujet de son feuilleton musical du ″Journal des débats″, en date du dimanche 15 juin 1890, Bordeaux, Féret et fils, 1890
- Petit traité d'harmonie moderne, d'après Sébastien Bach, Gluck, Mozart, Beethoven, Ch.-Marie de Weber, G. Spontini, G. Rossini, F. Hérold, G. Meyerbeer, etc., Paris, Richault, 1890
- La Sorcière d'Espelette, ou Une idylle au Pays basque, three-act lyrical piece (with S. de Mégret de Belligny), music by Louis Amouroux, Bordeaux, impr. de J. Durand, 1890
- (with Pierre-Barthélemy Gheusi, under the pseudonym Paul Lavigne), Gaucher Myriam, vie aventureuse d'un escholier féodal. Salamanque, Toulouse et Paris au XIIIe siècle, Paris, Firmin Didot, 1893
- L'Homme au masque de fer, c'est... Molière, opinion émise par Ubalde et présentée de nouveau par un bouquineur, Aix-les-Bains, 1893
- Molière à Bordeaux vers 1647 et en 1656, avec des considérations nouvelles sur ses fins dernières, à Paris en 1673... ou peut-être en 1703, Paris, Libraires associés, 1898
- Le Masque de fer et le livre de M. Frantz Funck-Brentano, Paris, Bordeaux et Orléans, 1899
- Le prisonnier masqué de la Bastille : son histoire authentique, Paris, Bordeaux et Orléans, 1900
- Un secret d'État sous Louis XIV, le prisonnier masqué de la Bastille, son histoire authentique, Paris, Libraires associés, 1900
