= Jean Mouliérat =

French operatic tenor

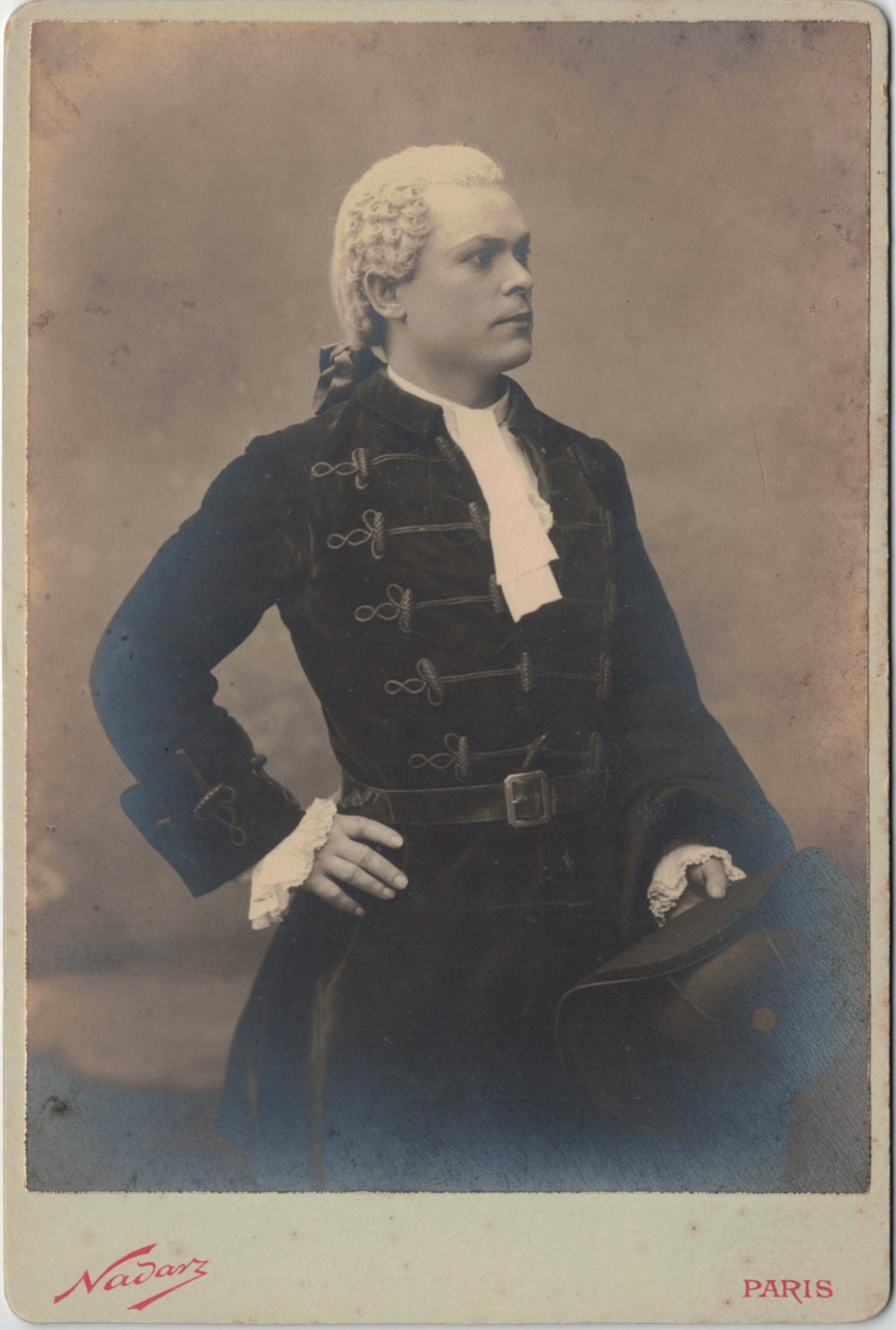
Mouliérat in the role of Wilhem Meister in Ambroise Thomas' Mignon, photograph by Nadar

Jean Mouliérat (13 November 1853 – 20 April 1932) was a French tenor. He spent most of his career at the Opéra comique in Paris.

== Origins ==
Born in Vers, near Cahors, Mouliérat was the son of an hotelier. The paternal hotel-restaurant, La truite dorée ("the golden trout"), was very well known in the region and already frequented by the "tourists" of the time. Having started his life as a simple shepherd at the age of 20, he joined the army. Incorporated into the 18th foot chasseurs regiment of the fort de Rosny, it is here that General Gaucher, remarked this young man with a golden voice when on 14 July 1875, the tenor sang the patriotic song: Vous n'aurez pas l'Alsace et la Lorraine. Mouliérat then attended classes at the Conservatoire national de musique et de déclamation of Paris, under professor Grosset's protective wing.

== Career ==
At the Opéra-Comique in Paris who hired him, Mouliérat was entrusted with the main roles of the repertoire: Wilhelm Meister in Ambroise Thomas' Mignon, Tybalt in Gounod's Roméo et Juliette, Don José in Bizet's Carmen, Tamino in Mozart's The Magic Flute, Alfredo in Verdi's La traviata. In 1893, Werther in Massenet's work, consecrated him.

An affection for the vocal cords put an end to his singing career in 1898. From then on, the singer became fascinated by the medieval castle which he acquired in 1896 at Prudhomat, in the Lot department, the Château de Castelnau-Bretenoux. He restored the monumental edifice where he liked to receive personalities of letters, arts or politics such as Colette, Auguste Rodin, the queen of Madagascar, Ranavalona III, more commonly known as Queen Ranavalo, Henri Lavedan of the Académie française, painter Henri Martin, Anatole de Monzie...

Mouliérat died in Paris on 20 April 1932. He donated his castle to the State (Ministry of Fine Arts). He is buried at Montparnasse Cemetery.
