= Château de Castelnau-Bretenoux =

Castle in Occitania, France

Coordinates: 44.8992°N 1.8264°E

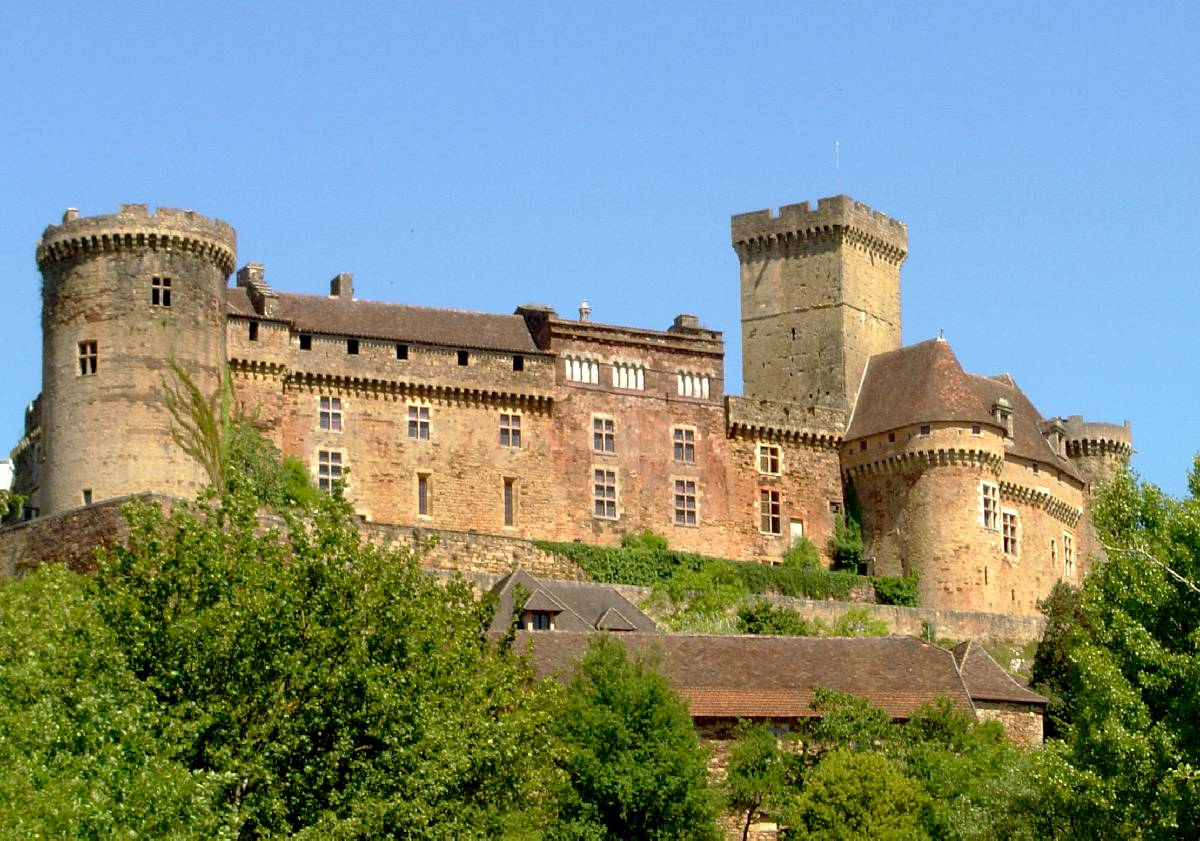
View of the castle.

The Château de Castelnau-Bretenoux (French pronunciation: [ʃato də kastɛlno bʁətnu]) is a castle in the commune of Prudhomat, Lot département, France. One of the most impressive in the Quercy region, it has been listed as a monument historique by the French Ministry of Culture since 1862.

== History ==
The ancestors of the barons of Castelnau only appear in written history in the 860s. In the cartulary of the Abbey of Beaulieu, mention is made of a donation from a man called Frotaire whose father, Frodin, administered lands in the viguerie of Exitensis from 840 on behalf of the Count of Quercy, later Counts of Rouergue and then Toulouse. Frodin married the daughter of the viscount of Turenne, which tied the families together several times over the next hundreds of years and brought conflict between the families. The marriage also indicates Frodin was a man of importance in the area. He would die around 885. His brother-in-law, Rodolphe of Turenne, Bishop of Bourges, founded the monastery at Beaulieu.

Frotaire expanded the domain of Exitensis and donated land to the monastery at Beaulieu. During the raids of the Vikings up the Dordogne River, under Frotaire's brother's Matfred's rule, and later his son Etienne, they abandoned their lands, leaving them under the control of the monks at Beaulieu and settled in Gramat, then under the Count of Rouergue, and built the church of Saint Pierre. Etienne's brother Bernard would later become the Bishop of Cahors. Matfred's daughter, Ermetrude, married Hugues de Rouergue, who became the Count of Gramat in 960, the son of the Count of Haut-Quercy, Ermengol of Rouergue.

It was Hugues who seized the monastery of Beaulieu in 961 to reclaim lost lands and properties of his wife's family, receiving consent from the Count of Toulouse, William Taillefer I. Their son, Bernard II, became the abbot of Beaulieu in 981 and later Bishop of Cahors in 1005. Bernard's elder brother Robert became the next Baron of Gramat. He had two sons, Robert, known as Hugues and Bernard III. It was Hugues I who built a new castle on a hill in Prudhomat and called himself the first Baron of Castelnau.

=== 11th century ===
Hugues I found himself in front of the Council of Limoges in 1031. He had seized and ransacked the Abbey of Beaulieu, driving out his brother who was the abbot and made himself lay abbot. He repented but remained lay abbot with overall control being via a monk, before seizing it again probably over a dispute about land ownership. In 1040, he donated Carennac and its church to the Cluny order. In 1070, Hugues built a new castle on the plateau and named it Chateauneuf. It appears that the site was previously owned by the La Gardelle's. His original castle may have been near Loubressac at Les Peyrières. It was probably constructed as a tower with a wooded palisade with village next to it. By 1076, he returned the Abbey of Beaulieu and its assets to the Cluny order. He would later drown in the Dordogne River. In 1095 Hugues II, in front of his overlord, the Count of Toulouse and Pope Urban II in Martel, renowned his claims to the Abbey of Beaulieu. He left that same year on the First Crusade.

=== 12th century ===
During Gerbert II's barony, the chateau at Castelnau was seized in 1159 when King Henry II of England took the province of Quercy after Henry failed to unseat the Count of Toulouse while attempting to assert his wife, Eleanor of Aquitaine’s right to her possessions. The king was accompanied by Thomas Becket who was later governor of Cahors. Bernard regained the chateau but then lost it to Henry the Young King during the latter's dispute in France with his father Henry II. In 1184, Bernard's homage to the Count of Toulouse was transferred to Raymond II, Viscount of Turernne, his son in law, whom the former believed was a lessor lord to him, and so conflict between the two houses began.

=== 13th century ===
Maffre II took part in the Fourth Crusade in 1218. Prior to that event, in 1212, on assuming the barony, he paid homage to the French king, refusing to take an oath of allegiance to the Viscount of Turenne. Conflict followed, and the issue was arbitrated in June 1219, by Bernard VI of Ventadour, who settled in favour of Turennes, but Maffre refused again to pay homage to the latter. The matter was finally settled on 24 March 1222, in the presence of the abbots of Tulle, Rocamadour, and the Dean of Souillac, whereby he agreed to give homage to the Turennes but it would be in the form of an egg on a cart pulled by four white oxen, once a year. In 1241, he remained loyal to the French king Louis IX when the southern barons revolted and led to the Battle of Taillebourg. In 1244 and 1251, Maffre tried to again to have the homage with the Viscount of Turennes transferred to the king of France but failed. Conflict with Abbey of Beaulieu occurred again in 1228 when he seized people there and Maffre had to pay a fine as penance.

Guérin founded the bastide at Bretenoux in 1277 originally under the name Villafranca d'Orilenda (or Orlanda, Orlinda). He granted the town fishing rights, access to the river islands, and two markets a year on condition a wall was constructed around the town with moats and four gates. In 1280, after the Viscount of Turenne became a vassal of the English king, Guérin paid homage to Philip III, King of France.

=== 14th century ===
Maffre III served the king of France during the war in Flanders in 1304 and in 1308, Philip IV extended the promise made to Guerin that the barony would not swear allegiance to the English. Hugues III, son of Maffre, assumed the barony in 1315, and also had title, the Baron of Calmont-d’Olt. Philip V of France, reaffirmed in 1318, that the barony of Castelnau was a suzerainty of the Kings of France.

In 1316, Pope Clement VI forced Hugues III to renounce an agreement that he had forced on the Abbey of Beaulieu after the monks expressed their grievances. Hugues also granted a similar charter to Castelnau that had been granted to Bretenoux many years earlier and started improving the ramparts around the castle and proposed a church but works was not to be completed by him and delayed for around fifty years due to the Hundred Years' War. In 1345, he was taken prisoner by Henry of Grosmont, Duke of Lancaster during the English siege of Bergerac and was ransomed. Some sources say he died of the black plague or at the Battle of Poitiers but with his death, and the Treaty of Brétigny in 1360, the barony and castle passed by homage to English control under Edward III.

Even though King John II of France had maintained in 1350, when Jean I assumed the barony, that it would pay homage to the king of France, the homage was transferred from the king to the Viscounts of Turenne which Jean protested and ignored. In 1360, Jean I was forced to pay homage to king of England by the Treaty of Bretigny. In 1366-67, under feudal oath, he would accompany Edward the Black Prince to Spain for at least a year, but during his absence, his barony was attacked by mercenaries and routiers. After Jean I returned from service with King of England in Spain, he and his brother, Bêgon, Bishop of Cahors, joined with the Duke d’Anjou to begin an uprising in 1369 in Query against the English. By 1370, Cahors had been taken from the English. After a gathering of the Estates General of Quercy at Castelnau, they united for a final push against the English in Quercy forcing them out by 1387 and the routiers companies were paid off and left the area.

Around 1369, conflict with the Abbey of Beaulieu continued and the Castelnau's burnt down the abbey's chateau at Astaillac killing eighty people including the abbot's sister and the son of Hugues of Beaulieu, Lord of Astaillac. Jean would sell part of his fief he owned in Beaulieu to the Viscount of Turenne and by 1379, the Abbey of Beaulieu now paid homage to the Turenne's. Work resumed in 1380 and continued until 1395 to complete the fortifications around the castle that had been started 40 to 50 years earlier. Jean I died in 1395 with no heir and the title passed to his nephew Pons de Caylus.

=== 15th century ===
Pons assumed the barony from his uncle and swore homage to King of France in 1396. In 1407, as head of the Lords of Quercy, assisted the Count of Armagnac with a truce with tbe English in Quercy. Squabbles over land ownership continued with the Turenne's but was settled in 1413, as the wars with the English had resulted in lax vassalages. His son Antoine assumed the barony in 1419. He was made the King Charles VII of France representative in Quercy in 1442. In 1460, Bishop Jean of Cahors, built a chapel in the castle and a church outside the enclosure. Jean II, baron from 1465-1505, would develop a library at the castle and contained volumes and manuscripts of local troubadours poetry.

=== 16th century ===
Jacques inherited the barony in 1505, and paid homage to Louis XII. He would marry Francoise de la Tour, daughter of the Viscount of Turenne in 1499, ending centuries of conflict between the families. As a soldier, he took part in the king's wars in Flanders and Italy. He would inaugurate the collegiate church at Castelnau around 1505, started by his father.

Jean III assumed the barony in 1514 from his older brother Jacques, with the king of France accepting his homage, but he left no real contribution to the history of the barony, and with no heir, bequeathed the barony to a distant relative.

With no male heir and the barony passed to Pierre Guillem de Clermont-Lodeve, the great-grandson of Pons I in 1530. Serving the king, Francis I, he was captain of Aigues-Mortes, governor of Languedoc in 1526 until 1533, seneschal of Carcassonne in 1533 and an advisor and chamberlain to the king. Pierre Guilliem married Marguerite de la Tour de Turenne in 1514, the last time a Castelnau would marry a Turenne.

Gui I assumed the role baron in 1537 as his elder Jaques had joined the church eventually becoming a bishop. He also served the king Francis I of France, as the Seneschal of Carsassone in 1539 aged only eighteen. He died young aged twenty-three. The barony was maintained by his widow Louise de Bretagne until his son Gui II turned eighteen in 1562.

Gui II, also served the king, as a Seneschal of Toulouse in 1565 and Governor of Quercy in 1574. The Castelnaud's remained Catholic throughout the French Wars of Religion and maintained the king's cause in Quercy and aroused the hatred the Protestants in the province. Gui II was killed by Protestants of Henry de Navarre on 29 May 1580 in Cahors during city's capture. Castelnaud barony at this time consisted of Bretenoux, St Martin-des-Bois, St Michel-Loubéjou, Bonneviole, Pauliac, Cornac, Glanes, Belmont, Girac, and part of Tauriac.

His son Alexandre assumed the title in 1580. In addition to his title of baron he was the Count of Clermont-Lodève. On 15 May 1593, Alexandre as the head of the nobles of the states of Quercy, announced he would swear allegiance to the future Protestant king of France Henry IV in order end the fighting between Catholic league and latter's Protestants in Quercy. Henry IV converted to a Catholic in July 1593. Known as a violent man, it was said Alexandre died, beaten to death in bed with sandbags by his servants. The French Wars of Religion ended in 1598.

=== 17th century ===
Gabriel-Aldonce ruled the barony from 1621 until 1657, visiting it infrequently. During the reign of Louis XIII, Cardinal Richelieu implemented a royal plan to raze the old medieval castle fortifications in France but Castelnau was spared as it no longer had a military function and due to services Gabriel had provided to the king.

With no heir, Louis-Francois, brother of Gabriel assumed the barony in 1657, renouncing his calling in the church, Dean of Castelnau, and was allowed to marry but he too had no heir. One of his contributions to Castelnau was an altarpiece sculpted for the collegiate church.

In, 1691, Louis-Guillaume, brother of Louis-Francois, took the title and was the last baron, and being a serious gambler, was once expelled from the court of Louis XIV, allegedly cheating at cards. He married late, aged 66, seven years after inheriting the barony. His wife Jeanne was the daughter of Louis Charles d'Albert, 2nd Duke of Luynes. Renaissance style architecture was added to the castle during this time period.

=== 18th century ===
The castle fell into disrepair after the death in 1715 of the last Castelnau, the twelve year old daughter of Louis-Guillaume who had died in 1705, and it reverted to his widow Jeanne, a member of the de Luynes family. On her death in 1756, the fiefs at Castelnau passed to Charles d’Albert. The castle and its land was managed by farmers.

The French Revolution occurred in 1789 but it was a few years later when on 26 December 1793, a decree was issued, calling for the destruction of the castle's towers, battlements, drawbridge, and the filling of the moat. The decree was mostly ignored except for the moat which was emptied and the drawbridge permanently destroyed. The castle's library and archives were destroyed in a bonfire. No more maintenance occurred at the castle and it was neglected for thirty years.

=== 19th century ===
In 1830, the de Luynes family descendants sold the castle. A man called Jean-Baptisre Lacoste purchased it, with the idea of restoring it but instead sold it to Antoine Molin de Teyssieu, who in turn thought about demolishing it. But in 1844 the French people and government ensured that this would not be allow to happen. However, no restoration work or government buy-back occurred.

On 28/29 January 1851, when a fire broke out in the castle, the large gallery and buildings in the courtyard were destroyed. The insurance company bought it and sold it to a Mr. Dubousquet with an idea to convert it into a monastery. The idea failed and it was bought by Father Célestin Selves in 1873. On the death of the priest in 1880, a man named Gustave Deldon de Pradelle purchased it and began selling its stone. He died in 1891, and his family who inherited it, decided to sell.

Finally in 1896, its last private owner, Jean Mouliérat purchased the castle and spent thirty years restoring the building and rooms interiors. He was a singer with the Paris Opéra Comique and a collector of furniture and sacred artworks. Between 8 and 18 April 1932, Moulierat donated the castle to the French state, dying on 20 April 1932.

== Architecture ==
Construction began about 1100, under Hugues, baron of Castelnau, who built a wall around his manor. He was the ancestor of the powerful dynasty of Castelnau, who owned a rich and prosperous region and were vassals of the Counts of Toulouse. The castle was enlarged several times between the 12th and the 15th century, when it was necessary to adapt the fortifications to artillery. During the 17th century, the castle was improved in an aesthetical and practical way: large windows, richly decorated salons, balcony of honour. After a fire in the 1850s and neglected from the mid-1700s it was partially restored at the beginning of the 20th century.

=== Château ===
The castle of Castelnau-Brenenoux is located on the top of a hill, at the intersection of several river valleys, the Dordogne, the Bave, and Cère. The castle is visible from a distance and easily recognizable by its walls of red stone. The castle has three curtain walls forming a near triangle shape, with sides of 86m to the east, 84m to the north, and 83m, with three spur bastions and six semi-circular towers. A moat 12m wide and 8m deep stands before the eastern walls while a large, grassed terrace or lists separate the castle walls in other places, held back by outer walls and small bastions. Stone faussebraye’s protect the bottom of the walls and towers with a walkway on them for armed men. On the south-eastern outer wall, a bastion entrance gives access to the top of the eastern terrace or lists and the main entrance across the moat.

==== Gatehouse and moat ====
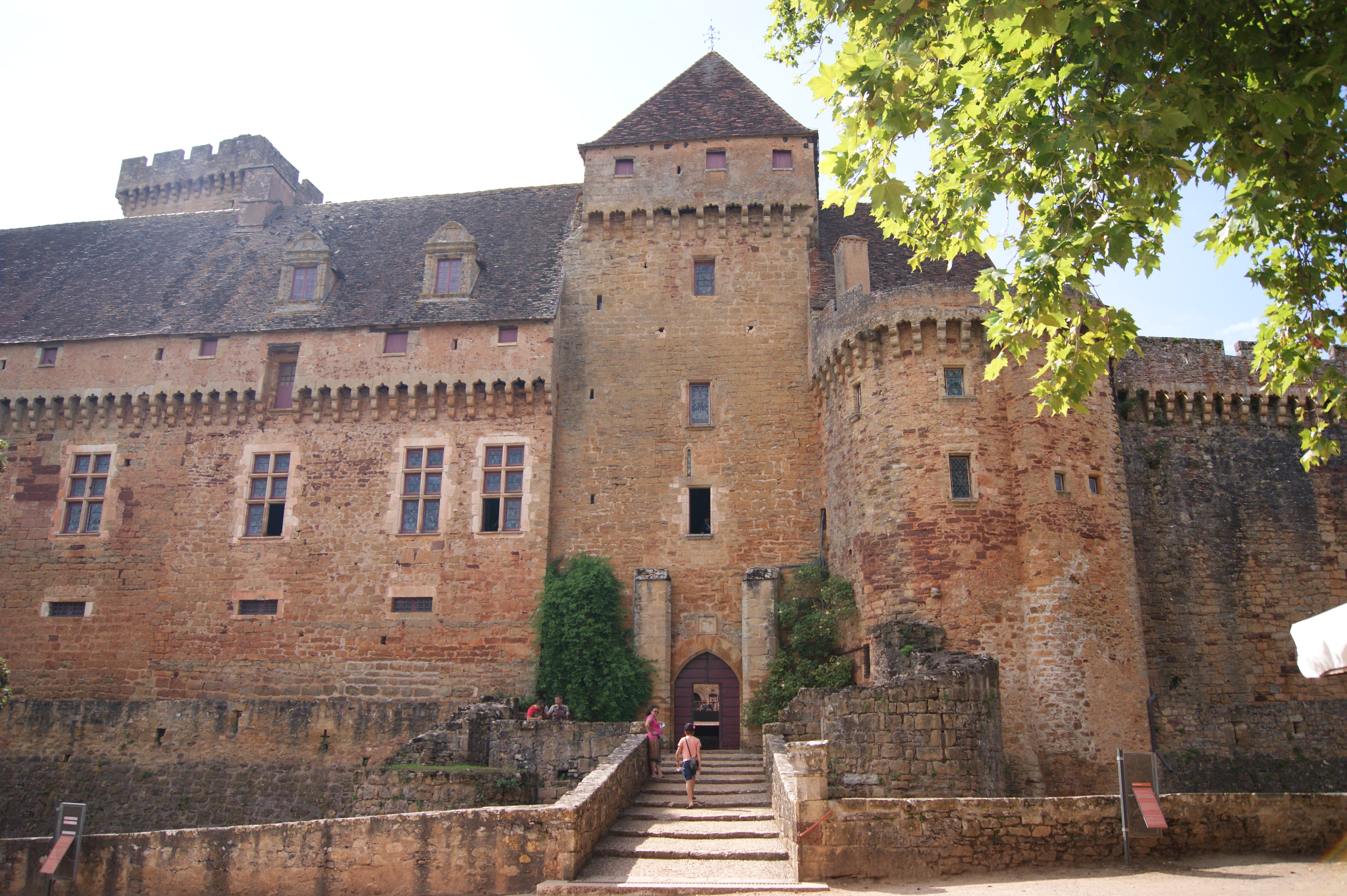
Chateau entrance

A drawbridge originally crossed the moat, covered by two towers with a third flanking tower. The drawbridge and the two towers were destroyed in 1793 during the French Revolution and a stone bridge installed in its place. A square tower from 13th-century covers the entrance, with its vault holding a stable for 100 horses. Residential apartments sit to its left. A corridor through this tower leads into a courtyard of the castle.

==== Residential keep ====
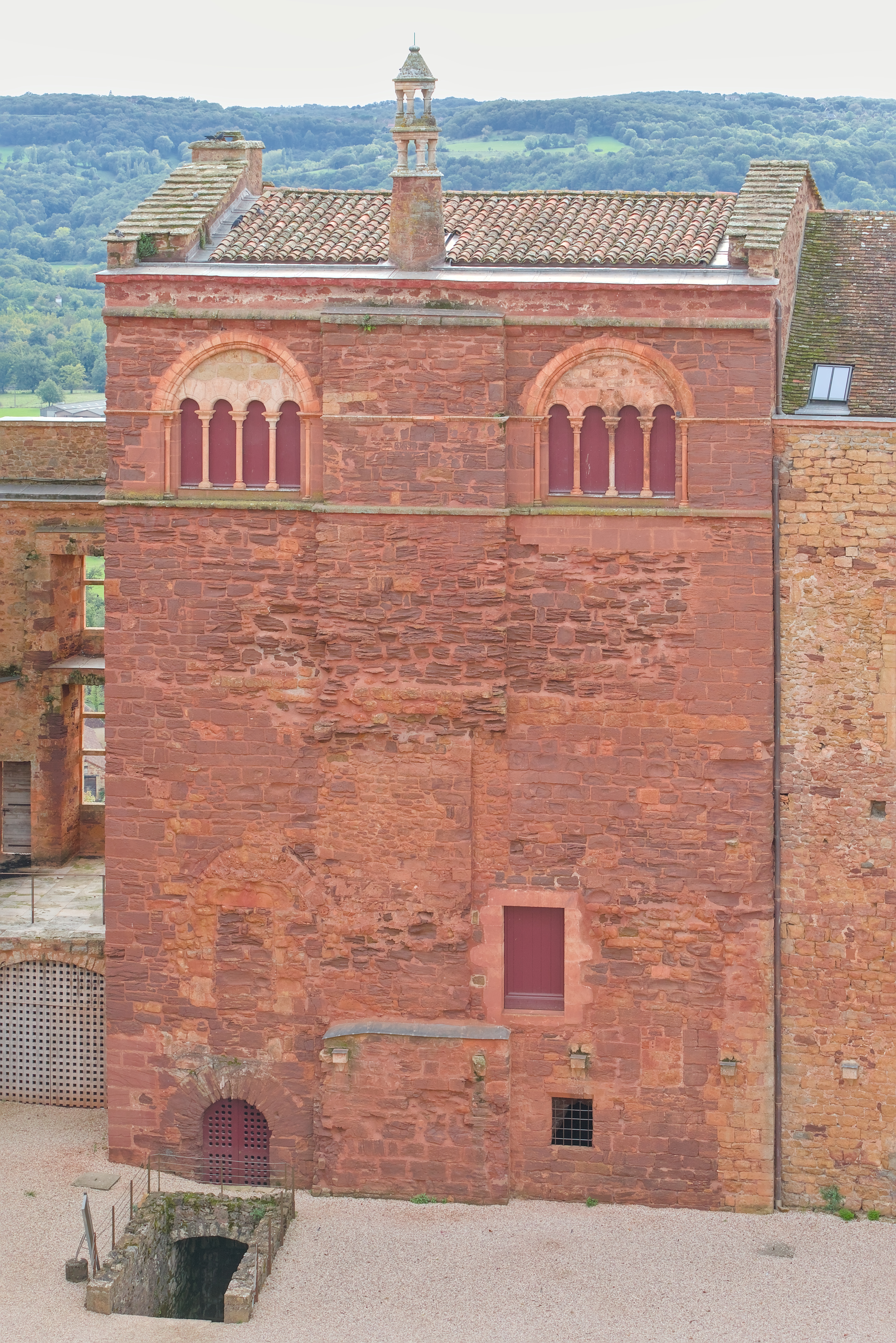
Auditoire

To left in the courtyard is the original 1070 red sandstone residential keep and the castle's first building. It is known as the Auditoire. The tower is 12 x 10m and the walls are 2 to 3m thick with one basement or cellar, a ground floor to the courtyard, and three floors. The first two floors contained family apartments while the last floor was the feudal hall. The hall has two Romanesque bays windows of white limestone with semi-circular arches, each with three columns and carved capitals. There is a chimney built into an eastern buttress extension leads to the roof level with an ornate Romanesque flue, though no attic or actual roof remains after a fire in 1851. At one time annex buildings stood in front of it.

==== Donjon ====
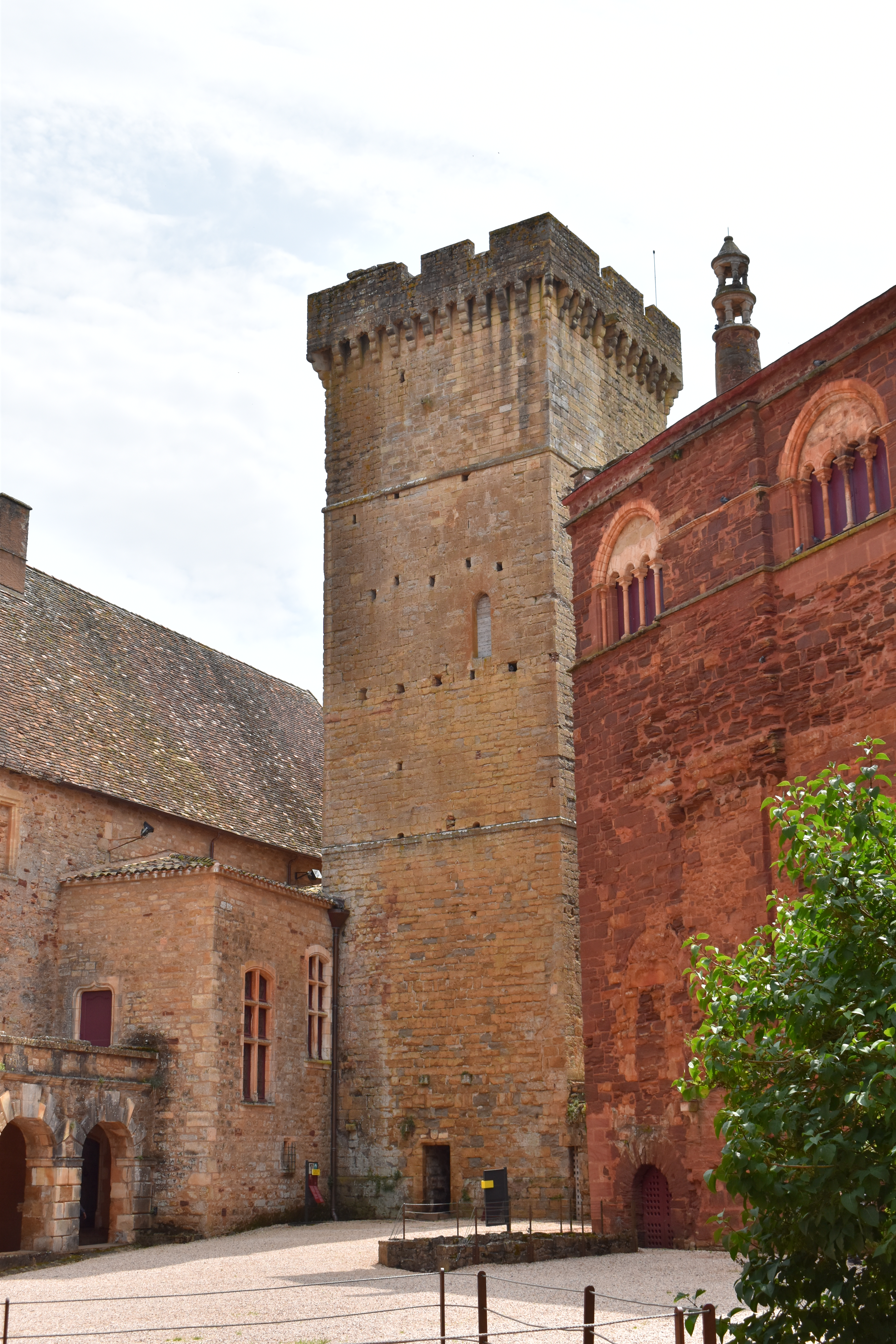
Keep

Next to auditoire is the main tower or keep. Built during the 13th century, it stands 30m tall with three floors. It was mainly used for defence. It was remodelled in the 17th century. The main doorway stood 6m off the ground accessing the vaulted second and third floors with a spiral staircase in the wall. It also has two barrel-vaulted cellars. At some point in time, the outside of the tower wall had a wooden gallery on all four sides, indicated now by post holes. The top of the tower had a bronze bell from 1475 as well as battlements and machicolations accessed by a second spiral staircase. The bell was sold in 1827 to Belmont-Bretenoux.

==== Castle chapel ====
To right of the auditoire tower is the castle chapel built in the 14th century, 12 m square with two bays and ribbed vaults, and a stone altar. The walls were painted in scenes from the Passion of Jesus, Resurrection of Jesus, and of saints but was destroyed when exposed to the elements in the past. There is a polychrome altar panel, and wooden staircase to gallery for the lords and an access to first floor of another part of the building.

==== Kitchen ====
To the right of the chapel is a kitchen built in the 17th century.

==== Grand balcony ====
Next to the kitchen is the grand balcony. When the castle had lost its military function, it was built in the 17th century through the curtain wall, which itself was built with a semicircular tower in the 15th century.

==== Artillery tower ====
The northern military tower was built in the 15th century and is 14 metres in diameter. Consists of two lower floors used for defence purpose, and upper three floors, for residential use, with wood beam floors while the last ceiling is stone, holding up the exterior battlements. On all levels are gun ports and arrow slits. All floors are accessed by a spiral staircase. A shaft in front of this tower led to tunnels that exited into the countryside.

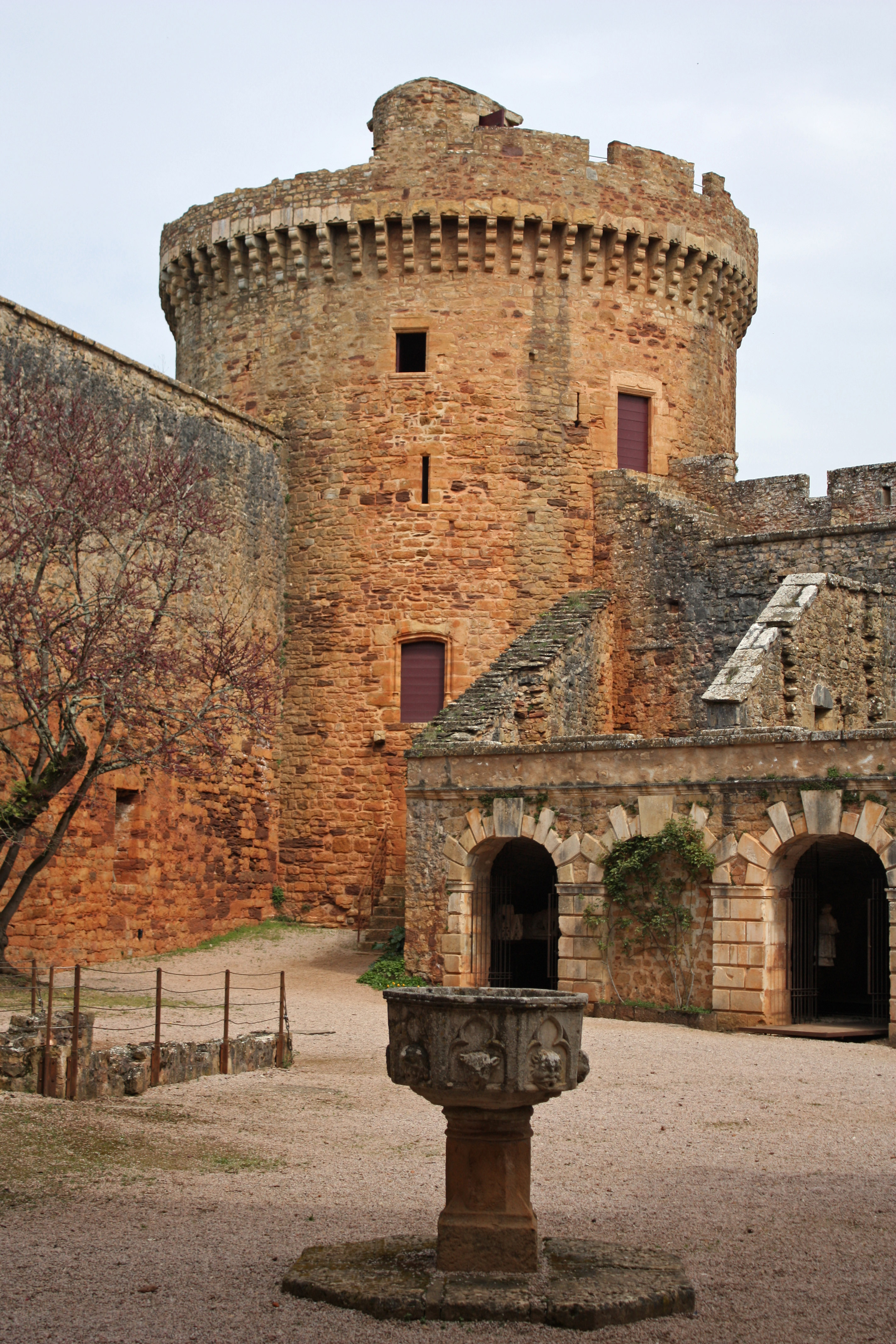
Artillery tower

==== Western tower ====
The western tower has thick walls pierced with openings for artillery. In the southeast corner is a tower and a semi-circular tower that defends the eastern residential building.

==== Residential floor ====
Below the residential floor on the eastern side is a lapidary gallery for Jean Mouliérat's collection but resulted in the destruction of a grand staircase, replaced with a neo gothic staircase. In the first-floor residences he removed 17th-century construction and 15th-century rooms and towers, redecorating the rooms with furniture, tapestries, statues and paintings.

- Antichamber

Initially the Mouliérat's bedroom it contains Louis XIV and XIII furniture.

- Chamber of Madam Mouliérat

Contains a repurposed 16th-century fireplace, Louis XIII furniture, a 16th-century bed and 17th-century portrait paintings.

- Chamber of Jean Mouliérat

Used as his bedroom, it contains a mixture of furniture and items from many time periods. Was used as a hall for meetings of the States of Quercy.

- Pewter and ceramics room

French ceramic and pewter plates hang on the wall of this study and contains 18th century furniture.

- Luynes salon

The room has a medieval fireplace with the coat of arms of Castelnau-Clamont. The ceiling and beams are painted with wood panelling. A 17th-century tapestry, l’Histoire de Diane, hangs on the wall.

- Louis XIV salon

In this room there is wooden painted panelling around the fireplace from the 17th century. The floor is wood parquet. Another 17th-century tapestry, representing l’Histoire de Diane, hangs on the wall. There are Louis XIV furniture and ancestral portrait paintings.

- L’oratoire

This room has a ribbed Gothic vault ceiling. Used as a dining room by Mouliérat, it is filled with religious artifacts.

=== Collegiate church of Saint-Louis ===
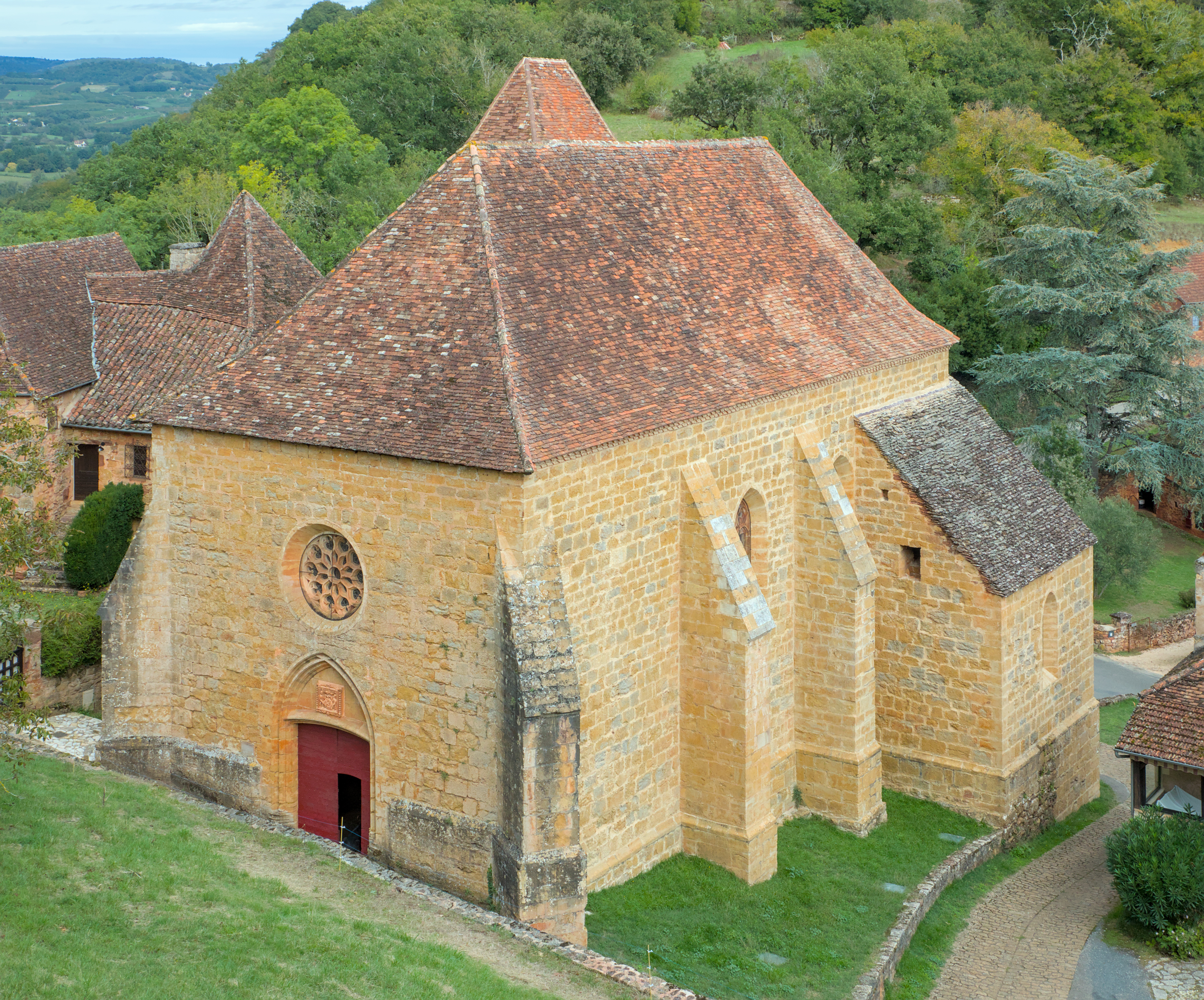
Collegiate church

Probably replacing a 13th-century church, work started on the collegiate church in 1507 after Pope Julius II grant permission in 1506, a year after the death of Jean II who had begun the request for new church. By the end of the 1500s the church became a patron of Saint Louis. It has renaissance carved wooden stalls, stain glass windows and in the south chapel a silver and copper reliquary in the shape of an arm of Saint Louis.

=== Village ===
A small village surrounded the castle, along the concentric slopes of the eastern side of the hill. Hugues III formalised his relationship with the village when in 1345 he issued a charter establishing its rights and freedoms.

== Barons of Castelnau ==
=== Barons of Castelnau ===
- Hugues
- Hugues II
- Gerbert I (1107-1158)
- Herbert II (1158-1178)
- Bernard (1178-1212)
- Maffre II (1212-1255)
- Guerin (1255-1299)
- Maffre III (1299-1315)

=== Barons of Castelnau-Calmont ===
- Hugues III (1315-1350)
- Jean I (1350-1395)

=== Barons of Castelnau-Caylus ===
- Pons (1395-1419)
- Antoine (1419-1465)
- Jean II (1465-1505)
- Jacques (1505-1514)
- Jean III (1514-1530)

=== Barons of Castelnau-Lodève ===
- Pierre Guillem (1530-1537)
- Gui (1537-1544)
- Gui II (1544-1580)
- Alexandre (1580-1621)
- Gabriel Aldonce (1621-1657)
- Louis-Francois (1657-1691)
- Louis-Guillem (1691-1705)

== See also ==
- List of castles in France
