= Prudhomat =

- Commune
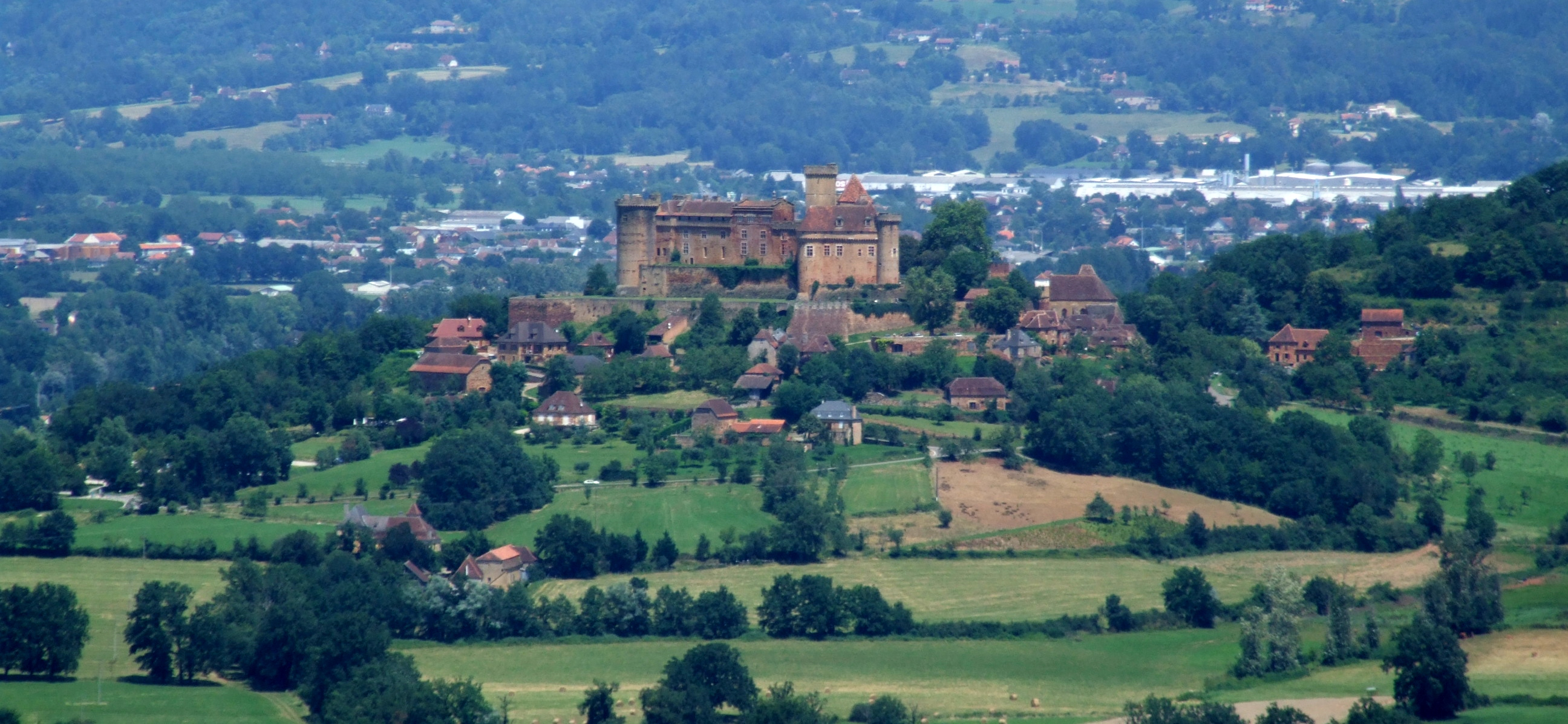
- Château de Castelnau-Bretenoux
- Location of Prudhomat
- Location within France Location within Occitanie
- Coordinates: 44°53′59″N 1°48′49″E
- Country: France
- Region: Occitania
- Department: Lot
- Arrondissement: Figeac
- Canton: Cère et Ségala

Government
  - Mayor (2020–2026): Francis Ayroles
- Area^{1}: 12.39 km^{2} (4.78 sq mi)
- Elevation: 158 m (518 ft)
- Highest elevation: 267 m (876 ft)
- Lowest elevation: 120 m (390 ft)
- Population (2023): 733
  - Density: 59.2/km^{2} (153/sq mi)
- Time zone: UTC+01:00 (CET)
  - Summer (DST): UTC+02:00 (CEST)
- INSEE/Postal code: 46228 /46130
- ^{1} French Land Register data, which excludes lakes, ponds, glaciers > 1 km^{2} (0.386 sq mi or 247 acres) and river estuaries.

Prudhomat (French pronunciation: [pʁydɔma]; Occitan: Prudomat) is a commune in the Lot department in south-western France.

The Château de Castelnau-Bretenoux is located in Prudhomat.

== Toponymy ==
The toponym Prudhomat (in Occitan Prudomat) is based on the French prud'homme, which here refers to a community of elected bourgeois who control the police and the communication routes.

== Geography ==
Commune located on the edge of the Lot, near the department of Corrèze on the Dordogne at the confluence with the rivers, the Bave, the Mamoul and the Cère.

== Local culture and heritage ==
=== Places and monuments ===
- Château de Castelnau-Bretenoux was classified as a historical monument in 1862
- Collegiate Church of Saint-Louis of the castle of Castelnau-de-Bretenoux was classified as a historical monument on March 18, 1913. Several objects are referenced in the Palissy database.

==== La Chapelle Sainte-Marie de Félines ====
It has its origin in the 7th century as a pilgrimage site dedicated to Virgin Mary and was mentioned as land donated to the monastery at Beaulieu-sur-Dordogne in 887 by Frotaire, an ancestor of the barons of Castelnau. The family chapel was restored by Jacques, Baron Castelnau-Caylus in the early 1500s. The chapel features a burial of Jacques near the altar, a ribbed vault, and a replica of a 12th-century statue of the Virgin. A family coat of arms is the keystone of the choir ribs while a niche in a wall near the altar may be from the original 11th-century building. It was classified as a historical monument in 1913.

==== Church of Saint-Gilles de Bonneviole ====
Built at various times 10th, 11th, and 12th centuries. A church was located there as early as 926 when it was donated to the monastery at Beaulieu sur Dordogne in a will by Matfred, an ancestor of the barons of Castelnau-Bretenoux. More donations of church land was made to the monastery in 1100 by the Castelnau's. The church, with the exception of the western façade and the bell tower, was listed as a historical monument in 1979. Several objects are referenced in the Palissy database.

==== L'Eglise Saint-Julien de Pauliac ====
It was founded in 900 by Count Géraud d'Aurillac as a priory and managed by the Abbey of Saint-Géraud d'Aurillac until 1794 with the barons of Castelnau having a say in the choice of the prior as the Abbey relied on the latter's protection. The nave 26 m by 9 m, and the aspe, date from the 11th century, while two columns in the church date from the 10th century. The bells date from the 1600s. The building is referenced in the Mérimée database and in the General Inventory of the Occitanie region. Several objects are referenced in the Palissy database.

==== L'Eglise Saint-Martin-des-Bois ====
The church is named in honour of Saint Martin and is in the style of Latin Cross, 15 m by 7 m. It was part of Abbey of Figeac until 1350. It then became the possession of the nuns of Coyroux near Aubazines.

==== L'Eglise du prieuré Saint-Pierre de Félines ====
A chapel was present at the site as of 887 when it was mentioned in cartulary of the monastery at Beaulieu sur Dordogne. In 928, the chapel was ceded to the latter's control and formed a priory. By 1112, the church had been built and consecrated by the Bishop of Cahors, Géraud II de Cardaillac and became the church of Saint-Pierre. It was rebuilt in the 1600s after being damaged during the French Wars of Religion. In the late 1700s, it was looted in the French Revolution, its bells thrown into the Dordogne river, then closed as the parish church in 1808. It was sold in 1828 and became a barn. The building was listed as a historical monument on 29 December 1978.

== See also ==
- Communes of the Lot department
