= Millau Viaduct =

Cable-stayed bridge in Occitanie, France

Millau Viaduct Viaduc de Millau (French)
- A view of the Millau Viaduct in 2005
- Coordinates: 44°04′46″N 03°01′20″E
- Carries: 4 lanes of the A75 autoroute
- Crosses: Gorge valley of the river Tarn
- Locale: Millau-Creissels, Aveyron, France
- Official name: Viaduc de Millau
- Maintained by: Compagnie Eiffage du Viaduc de Millau

Characteristics
- Design: Multiple-span cable-stayed viaduct motorway bridge
- Material: Concrete, steel
- Total length: 2,460 m (8,070 ft)
- Width: 32.05 m (105.2 ft)
- Height: 343 m (1,125 ft) (max pylon above ground)
- Longest span: 342 m (1,122 ft)
- No. of spans: 204 m (669 ft), 6×342 m (1,122 ft), 204 m (669 ft)
- Clearance below: 270 m (890 ft)
- Design life: 120 years

History
- Designer: Norman Foster, architect Dr Michel Virlogeux, structural engineer
- Constructed by: Compagnie Eiffage du Viaduc de Millau
- Construction start: 16 October 2001; 24 years ago
- Construction cost: €394 million
- Opened: 16 December 2004, at 9:00
- Inaugurated: 14 December 2004; 21 years ago

Statistics
- Toll: from €8.30

Location
- Interactive map of Millau Viaduct

The Millau Viaduct (French: Viaduc de Millau [vja.dyk də mi.jo]) is a multispan cable-stayed bridge completed in 2004 across the gorge valley of the Tarn near (west of) Millau in the Aveyron department in the Occitanie Region, in Southern France. The design team was led by engineer Michel Virlogeux and English architect Norman Foster. It was the tallest bridge in the world for over two decades (until late 2025), with a structural height of 343 metres (1,125 ft).

The Millau Viaduct is part of the A75–A71 autoroute axis from Paris to Béziers and Montpellier. The cost of construction was approximately €394 million (£345 million). It was built over three years, formally inaugurated on 14 December 2004, and opened to traffic two days later on 16 December. The bridge has been consistently ranked as one of the greatest engineering achievements of modern times, and received the 2006 Outstanding Structure Award from the International Association for Bridge and Structural Engineering.

== History ==
In the 1980s, high levels of road traffic near Millau in the Tarn valley were causing congestion, especially in the summer due to holiday traffic on the route from Paris to Spain. A method of bypassing Millau had long been considered, not only to ease the flow and reduce journey times for long-distance traffic, but also to improve the quality of access to Millau for its local businesses and residents. One of the solutions considered was the construction of a road bridge to span the river and gorge valley. The first plans for a bridge were discussed in 1987 by CETE, and by October 1991 the decision was made to build a high crossing of the Tarn by a structure of around 2,500 metres (8,200 ft) in length. During 1993–1994, the government consulted with seven architects and eight structural engineers. During 1995–1996, a second definition study was made by five associated architect groups and structural engineers. In January 1995, the government issued a declaration of public interest to solicit design approaches for a competition.

In July 1996 the jury decided in favour of a cable-stayed design with multiple spans, as proposed by the SODETEG consortium led by Michel Virlogeux, Norman Foster and Arcadis. The decision to proceed by grant of contract was made in May 1998; then in June 2000, the contest for the construction contract was launched, open to four consortia. In March 2001, Eiffage established the subsidiary Compagnie Eiffage du Viaduc de Millau (CEVM), and was declared winner of the contest and awarded the prime contract in August.

=== Possible routes ===
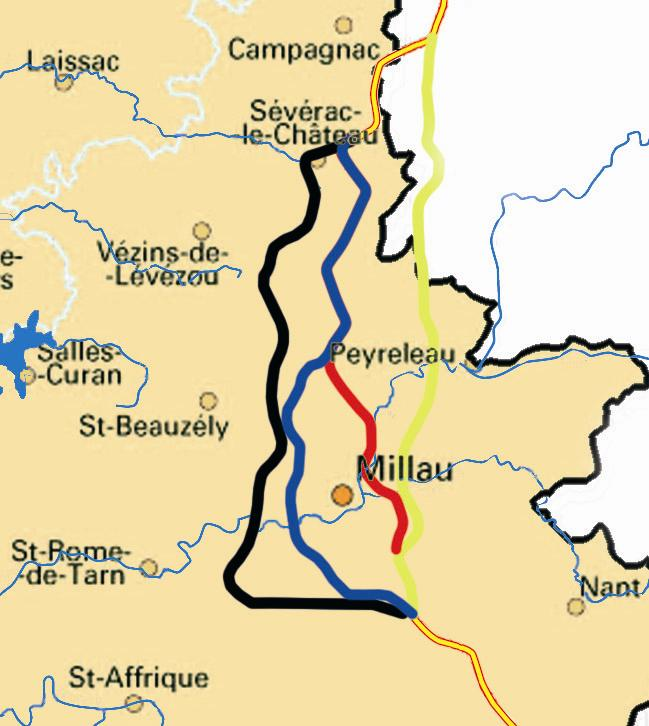
The four proposed routes for the new A75 autoroute around Millau

In initial studies, four potential options were examined:

1. Great Eastern (French: grand Est) (yellow route) – passing east of Millau and crossing the valleys of the Tarn and Dourbie on two very high and long bridges (spans of 800 and 1,000 metres or 2,600 and 3,300 feet) whose construction was acknowledged to be problematic. This option would have allowed access to Millau only from the Larzac plateau, using the long and tortuous descent from La Cavalerie. Although this option was shorter and better suited to through-traffic, it did not satisfactorily serve the needs of Millau and its area.
2. Great Western (French: grand Ouest) (black route) – longer than the eastern option by 12 kilometres (7.5 mi), following the Cernon valley. Technically easier (requiring four viaducts), this solution was judged to have negative impacts on the environment, in particular on the picturesque villages of Peyre and Saint-Georges-de-Luzençon. It was more expensive than the preceding option, and served the region badly.
3. Near RN9 (French: proche de la RN9) (red route) – would have served the town of Millau well, but presented technical difficulties, and would have had a strong impact on existing or planned structures.
4. Intermediate (French: médiane), west of Millau (blue route) – was supported by local opinion, but presented geological difficulties, notably on the question of crossing the valley of the Tarn. Expert investigation concluded that these obstacles were not insurmountable.

The fourth option was selected by ministerial decree on 28 June 1989. It envisioned two possibilities:

1. the high solution, envisaging a 2,500-metre-long (8,200 ft) viaduct more than 200 metres (660 ft) above the river;
2. the low solution, descending into the valley and crossing the river on a 200-metre-long (660 ft) bridge, then a viaduct of 2,300 metres (7,500 ft), extended by a tunnel on the Larzac side.

After long construction studies by the Ministry of Public Works, the low solution was abandoned because it would have intersected the water table, had a negative impact on the town, cost more, and lengthened the driving distance. The choice of the 'high' solution was decided by ministerial decree on 29 October 1991.

After the choice of the high viaduct, five teams of architects and researchers worked on a technical solution. The concept and design for the bridge was devised by French designer and structural engineer Michel Virlogeux. He worked with the Dutch engineering firm Arcadis, responsible for the structural engineering of the bridge.

=== Choosing the definitive route ===
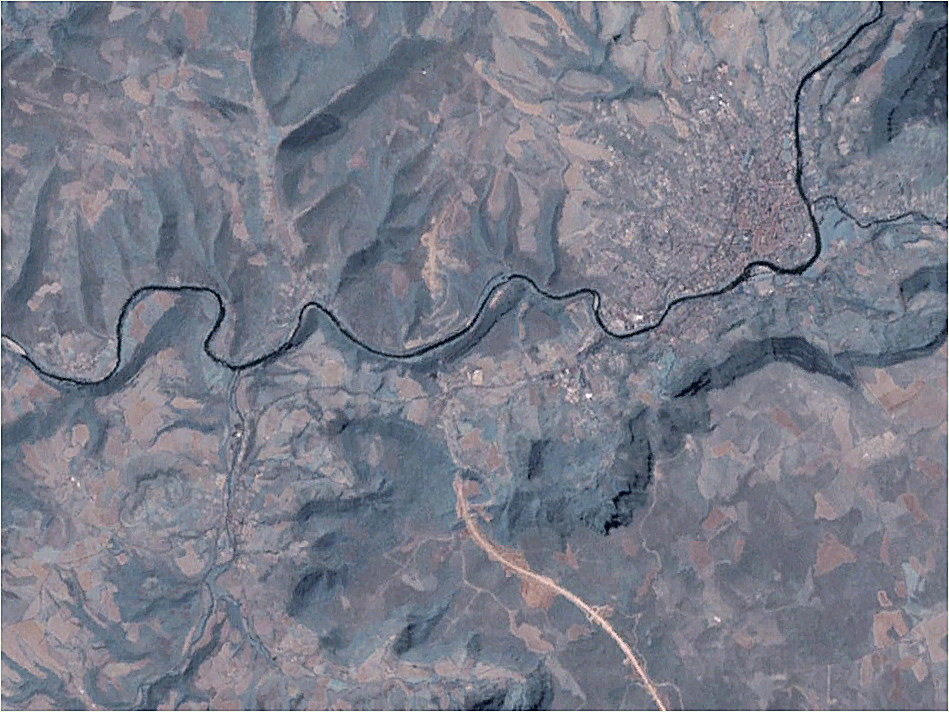
Satellite image of the proposed route before construction of the bridge

The 'high solution' required the construction of a 2,500-metre-long (8,200 ft) viaduct. From 1991 to 1993, the structures division of Sétra, directed by Virlogeux, carried out preliminary studies, and examined the feasibility of a single structure spanning the valley. Taking into account technical, architectural, and financial issues, the Administration of Roads opened the question for competition among structural engineers and architects to widen the search for realistic designs. By July 1993, seventeen structural engineers and thirty-eight architects applied as candidates for the preliminary studies. With the assistance of a multidisciplinary commission, the Administration of Roads selected eight structural engineers for a technical study, and seven architects for the architectural study.

=== Choice of technical design ===
Simultaneously, a school of international experts representing a wide spectrum of expertise (technical, architectural, and landscape), chaired by Jean-François Coste, was established to clarify the choices that had to be made. In February 1995, on the basis of proposals of the architects and structural engineers, and with support of the school of experts, five general designs were identified.

The competition was relaunched: five combinations of architects and structural engineers, drawn from the best candidates of the first phase, were formed; each was to conduct in-depth studies of one of the general designs. On 15 July 1996, Bernard Pons, minister of Public Works, announced the decision of the jury, which was constituted of elected artists and experts, and chaired by Christian Leyrit, the director of highways. The solution of a multiple-span viaduct cable-stayed bridge, presented by the structural engineering group Sogelerg, Europe Etudes Gecti and Serf, and the architects Foster + Partners was declared the best.

Detailed studies were carried out by the successful consortium, steered by the highways authority until mid-1998. After undergoing wind tunnel tests, the shape of the road deck was altered, and detailed corrections were made to the design of the pylons. When the details were eventually finalised, the whole design was approved in late 1998.

=== Contractors ===
The P2 pier of the Viaduct is the tallest structure in France, 13 m taller than the 330-metre Eiffel Tower.

Once the Ministry of Public Works had taken the decision to offer the construction and operation of the viaduct as a grant of contract, an international call for tenders was issued in 1999. Five consortia tendered:

1. Compagnie Eiffage du Viaduc de Millau (CEVM), a new subsidiary created by Eiffage;
2. a consortium led by the Spanish company Dragados, with Skanska, Sweden, and Bec, France;
3. Société du Viaduc de Millau, including the French companies ASF, Egis Projects, GTM Construction, Bouygues Travaux Publics, SGE, CDC Projets, Tofinso, and the Italian company Autostrade;
4. a consortium led by Générale Routière, with Via GTI (France) and Cintra, Nesco, Acciona, and Ferrovial Agroman (Spain).

The Compagnie Eiffage du Viaduc de Millau, working with the architect Norman Foster, was successful in obtaining the tender. Because the government had already taken the design work to an advanced stage, the technical uncertainties were considerably reduced. A further advantage of this process was to make negotiating the contract easier, reducing public expense, and speeding up construction, while minimising such design work as remained for the contractor.

All the member companies of the Eiffage group had some role in the construction work. The construction consortium was made up of the Eiffage TP company for the concrete part, the Eiffel company for the steel roadway (Gustave Eiffel built the Garabit viaduct in 1884, a railway bridge in the neighbouring Cantal département), and the Enerpac company for the roadway's hydraulic supports. The engineering group Setec has authority in the project, with SNCF engineering having partial control. Appia (company) was responsible for the job of the bituminous road surface on the bridge deck, and Forclum (fr) for electrical installations. Management was handled by Eiffage Concessions.

The only other business that had a notable role on the building site was Freyssinet, a subsidiary of the Vinci Group specialising in prestressing. It installed the cable stays and put them under tension, while the prestress division of Eiffage was responsible for prestressing the pillar heads.

The steel road deck, and the hydraulic action of the road deck were designed by the Walloon engineering firm Greisch from Liège, Belgium, also an information and communication technologies (ICT) company of the Walloon Region. They carried out the general calculations and the resistance calculations for winds of up to 225 kilometres per hour (140 mph). They also applied the launching technology.

The sliding shutter technology for the bridge piers came from PERI.

=== Costs and resources ===
The bridge's construction cost up to €394 million, with a toll plaza 6 kilometres (3.7 mi) north of the viaduct, costing an additional €20 million. The builders, Eiffage, financed the construction in return for a concession to collect the tolls for 75 years, until 2080. However, if the concession yields high revenues, the French government can assume control of the bridge as early as 2044.

The project required about 127,000 cubic metres (166,000 cu yd) of concrete, 19,000 tonnes (21,000 short tons) of steel for the reinforced concrete, and 5,000 tonnes (5,500 short tons) of pre-stressed steel for the cables and shrouds. The builder claims that the lifetime of the bridge will be at least 120 years.

=== Opposition ===
Numerous organisations opposed the project, including the World Wildlife Fund (WWF), France Nature Environnement, the national federation of motorway users, and Environmental Action. Opponents advanced several arguments:

- The westernmost route would be better, longer by 3 kilometres (1.9 mi), but a third of the cost with its three more conventional structures.
- The objective of the viaduct would not be achieved; because of the toll, the viaduct would be little used, and the project would not solve Millau's congestion problems.
- The project would never break even; toll income would never amortise the initial investment, and the contractor would have to be supported by subsidies.
- The technical difficulties were too great, and the bridge would be dangerous and unsustainable; the pylons, sitting on the shale of the Tarn Valley, would not support the structure adequately.
- The viaduct represented a detour, reducing the number of visitors passing through Millau and slowing its economy.

== Construction ==
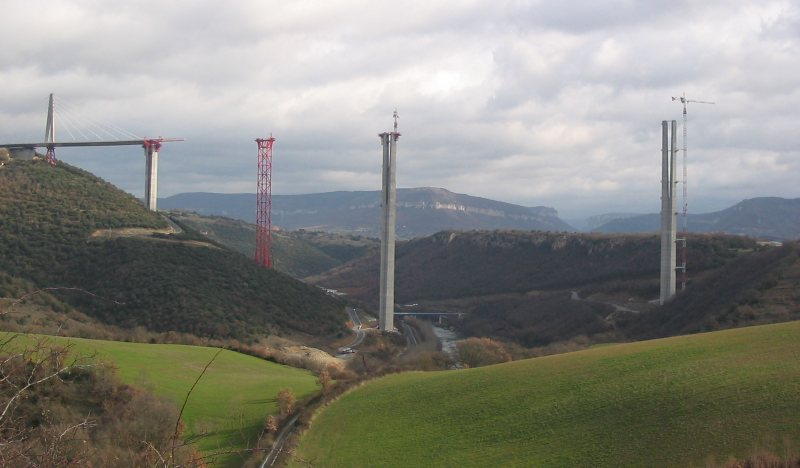
The northern half of the road deck being slowly launched across the pylons, as seen from the west in early 2004

Two weeks after the laying of the first stone on 14 December 2001, workers started digging deep shafts for the pilings. Each pylon is supported by four concrete pilings. Each piling is 15 metres (49 ft) deep and 5 metres (16 ft) in diameter, assuring the stability of the pylons. At the top of the pilings a large footing was poured, 3–5 metres (10–16 ft) in thickness, to reinforce the strength of the pilings. The 2,000 cubic metres (2,600 cu yd) of concrete necessary for the footings was poured at the same time as pilings.

In March 2002, the pylons emerged from the ground. The speed of construction then rapidly increased. Every three days, each pylon increased in height by 4 metres (13 ft). This performance was mainly due to sliding shuttering. Thanks to a system of shoe anchorages and fixed rails in the heart of the pylons, a new layer of concrete could be poured every 20 minutes.

=== Launching ===
The bridge road deck was constructed on plateaus at both ends of the viaduct, and pushed onto the pylons using bridge launching techniques. Each half of the assembled road deck was pushed lengthwise from the plateaus to the pylons, passing across one pylon to the next. During the launching, the road deck was also supported by eight temporary towers, which were removed near the end of construction. In addition to hydraulic jacks on each plateau pushing the road decks, each pylon was topped with a mechanism on top of each pylon that also pushed the deck. This mechanism consisted of a computer-controlled pair of wedges under the deck manipulated by hydraulics. The upper and lower wedge of each pair pointed in opposite directions. The wedges were hydraulically operated, and moved repeatedly in the following sequence:

1. The lower wedge slides under the upper wedge, raising it to the roadway above, and then forcing the upper wedge still higher to lift the roadway
2. Both wedges move forward together, advancing the roadway a short distance
3. The lower wedge retracts from under the upper wedge, lowering the roadway and allowing the upper wedge to drop away from the roadway; the lower wedge then moves back all the way to its starting position. There is now a linear distance between the two wedges equal to the distance forward the roadway has just moved.
4. The upper wedge moves backward, placing it further back along the roadway, adjacent to the front tip of the lower wedge and ready to repeat the cycle and advance the roadway by another increment.

The launching advanced the road deck at 600 millimetres (24 in) per cycle which was roughly four minutes long.

The mast pieces were driven over the new road deck lying down horizontally. The pieces were joined to form the one complete mast, still lying horizontally. The mast was then tilted upwards, as one piece, at one time in a tricky operation. In this way, each mast was erected on top of the corresponding concrete pylon. The stays connecting the masts and the deck were then installed, and the bridge was tensioned overall, and weight tested. After this, the temporary pylons could be removed.

=== Timeline ===
- 16 October 2001: work begins
- 14 December 2001: laying of the first stone
- January 2002: laying pier foundations
- March 2002: start of work on the pier support C8
- June 2002: support C8 completed, start of work on piers
- July 2002: start of work on the foundations of temporary, height adjustable roadway supports
- August 2002: start of work on pier support C0
- September 2002: assembly of roadway begins
- November 2002: first piers complete
- 25–26 February 2003: laying of first pieces of roadway
- November 2003: completion of the last piers (piers P2 at 245 metres (804 ft) and P3 at 221 metres (725 ft) are the highest piers in the world)
- 28 May 2004: the pieces of roadway are several centimetres apart, their juncture to be accomplished within two weeks
- 2nd half of 2004: installation of the pylons and shrouds, removal of the temporary roadway supports
- 14 December 2004: official inauguration
- 16 December 2004: opening of the viaduct, ahead of schedule
- 10 January 2005: initial planned opening date
Panorama of the Millau Viaduct

== Location ==
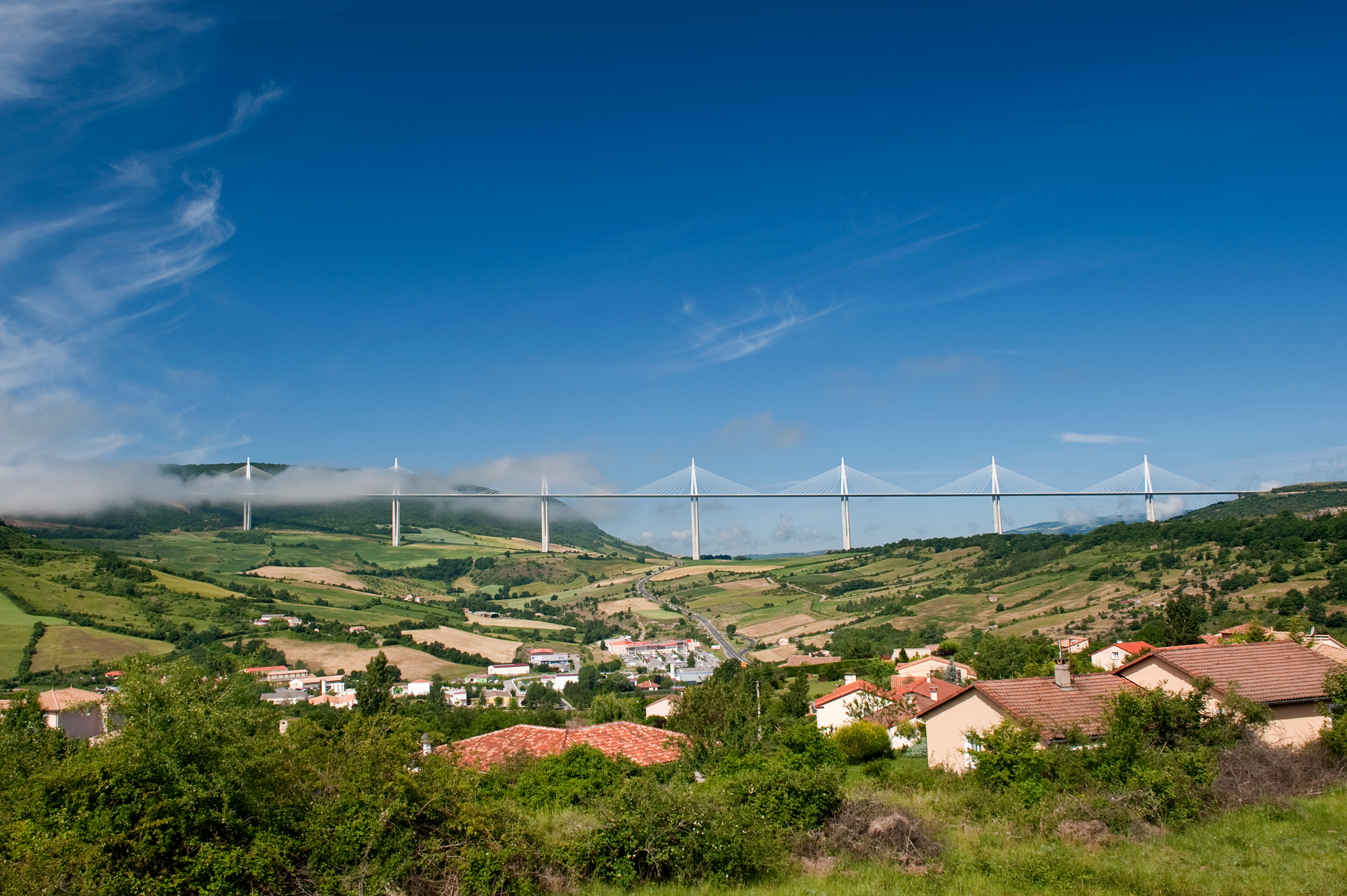
The Millau Viaduct and the town of Creissels

The Millau Viaduct is on the territory of the communes of Millau and Creissels, France, in the département of Aveyron. Before the bridge was constructed, traffic had to descend into the Tarn valley and pass along the route nationale N9 near the town of Millau, causing much traffic congestion at the beginning and end of the July and August holiday season. The bridge now traverses the Tarn valley above its lowest point, linking two limestone plateaus, the Causse du Larzac and the Causse Rouge, and is inside the perimeter of the Grands Causses regional natural park.

The Millau Viaduct forms the last link of the existing A75 autoroute (known as "la Méridienne"), from Clermont-Ferrand to Béziers. The A75, with the A10 and A71, provides a continuous high-speed route south from Paris through Clermont-Ferrand to the Languedoc region, thence to Spain, considerably reducing the cost and time of vehicle traffic travelling along this route. Many tourists heading to southern France and Spain follow this route because it is direct and without tolls for the 340 kilometres (210 mi) between Clermont-Ferrand and Béziers, except for the bridge.

The Eiffage group, which constructed the Viaduct also operates it, under a government contract, which allows the company to collect tolls for up to 75 years. As of 2025, the toll bridge costs €11.20 for light automobiles (or €13.90 during the peak season of 15 June to 15 September).

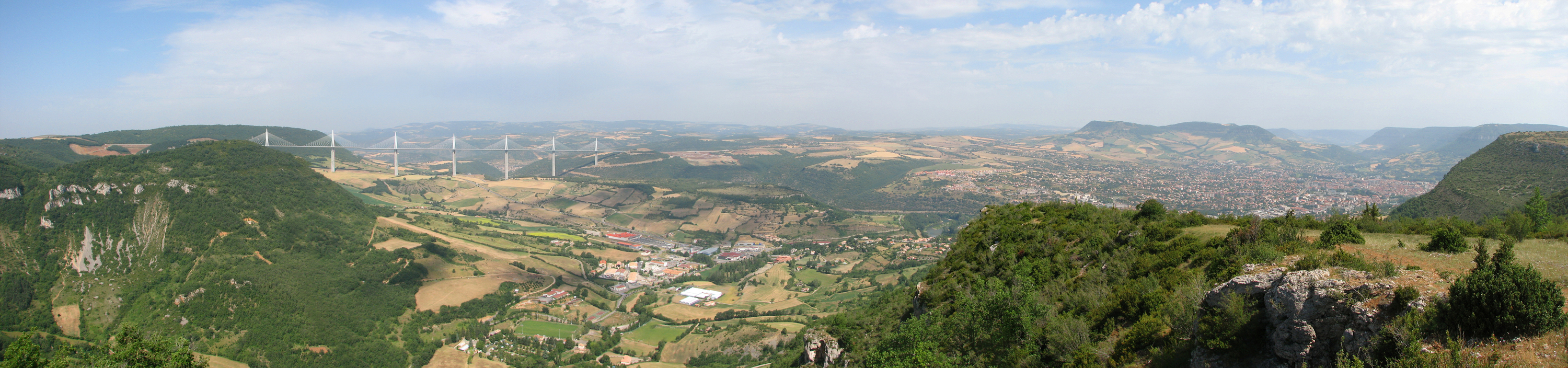
The Millau Viaduct, and the town of Millau on the right

== Structure ==
=== Pylons and abutments ===
Each of the seven pylons is supported by four deep shafts, 15 metres (49 ft) deep and 5 metres (16 ft) in diameter.

heights of the piers
P1	P2	P3	P4	P5	P6	P7
94.501 m (310 ft 0.5 in)	244.96 m (803 ft 8 in)	221.05 m (725 ft 3 in)	144.21 m (473 ft 2 in)	136.42 m (447 ft 7 in)	111.94 m (367 ft 3 in)	77.56 m (254 ft 6 in)

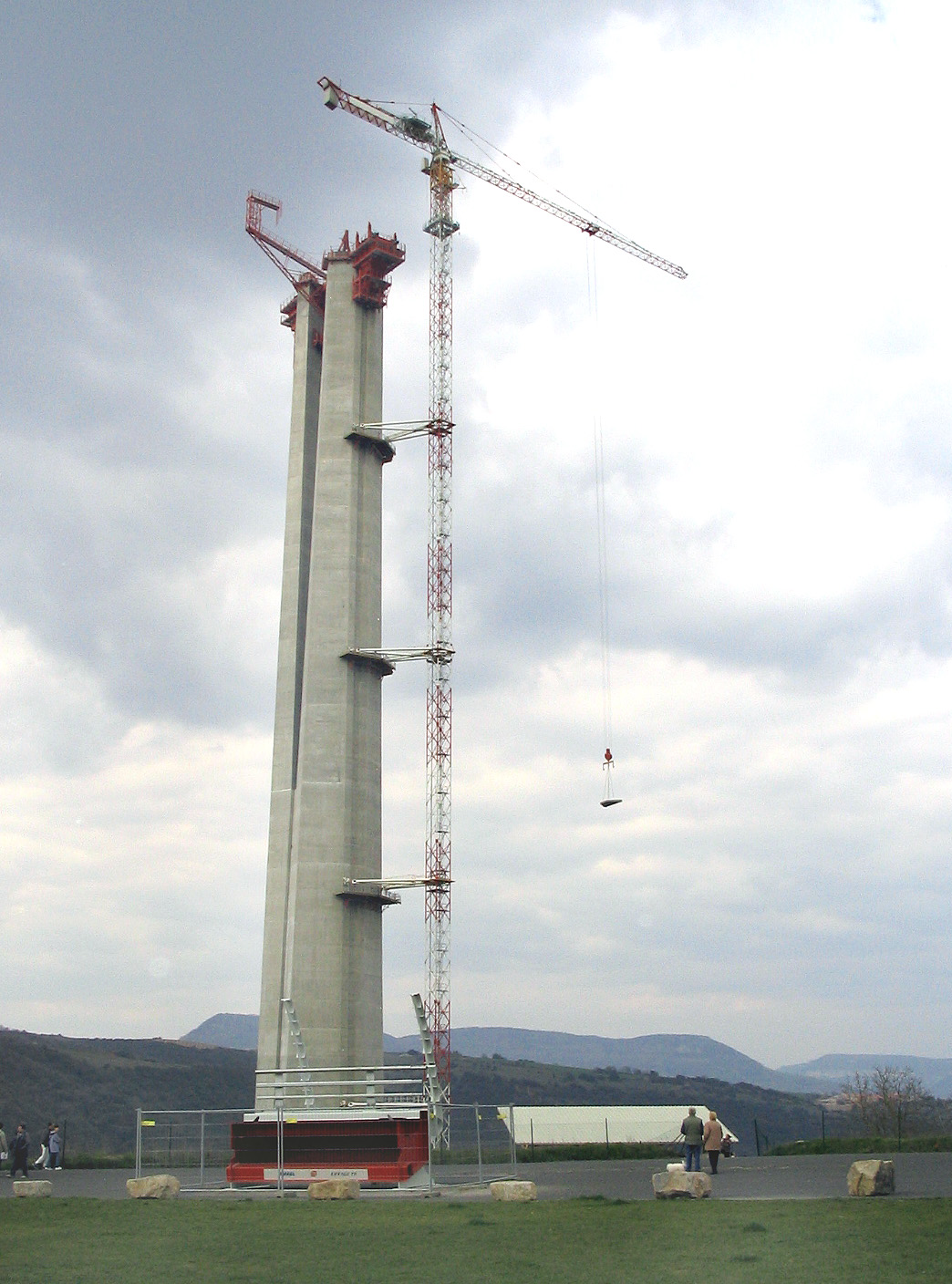
A pylon under construction

The abutments are concrete structures that provide anchorage for the road deck to the ground in the Causse du Larzac and the Causse Rouge.

=== Road deck ===
The metallic road deck, which appears very light despite its total mass of around 36,000 tonnes (40,000 short tons), is 2,460 metres (8,070 ft) long and 32 metres (105 ft 0 in) wide. It comprises eight spans. The six central spans measure 342 metres (1,122 ft), and the two outer spans are 204 metres (669 ft). These are composed of 173 central box beams, the spinal column of the construction, onto which the lateral floors and the lateral box beams were welded. The central box beams have a 4 metres (13 ft 1 in) cross-section, and a length of 15–22 metres (49–72 ft) for a total weight of 90 metric tons (99 short tons). The deck has an inverse airfoil shape, providing negative lift in strong wind conditions.

=== Masts ===
The seven masts, each 87 metres (285 ft) high, and weighing around 700 tonnes (690 long tons; 770 short tons), are set on top of the concrete pylons. Between each of them, eleven stays (steel cables) are anchored, providing support for the road deck.

=== Cable stays ===
Each mast of the Viaduct is equipped with a monoaxial layer of eleven pairs of cable-stays; laid face to face. Depending on their length, the cable stays were made of 55 to 91 high tensile steel cables, or strands, themselves formed of seven strands of steel (a central strand with six intertwined strands). Each strand has triple protection against corrosion (galvanisation, a coating of petroleum wax, and an extruded polyethylene sheath). The exterior envelope of the stays is itself coated along its entire length with a double helical weatherstrip. The idea is to avoid running water which, in high winds, could cause vibration in the stays and compromise the stability of the viaduct.

The stays were installed by the Freyssinet company.

=== Road surface ===
To allow for deformations of the metal road deck under traffic, a special surface of modified bitumen was installed by research teams from Appia (company). The surface is somewhat flexible to adapt to deformations in the steel deck without cracking, but it must nevertheless have sufficient strength to withstand motorway conditions (fatigue, density, texture, adherence, anti-rutting etc.). The 'ideal formula' was found after two years of research.

=== Electrical installations ===
The electrical installations of the viaduct are large in proportion to the size of the bridge. There are 30 kilometres (19 mi) of high-current cables, 20 kilometres (12 mi) of fibre optics, 10 kilometres (6.2 mi) of low-current cables, and 357 telephone sockets; allowing maintenance teams to communicate with each other and with the command post. These are situated on the deck, on the pylons, and on the masts.

The pylons, road deck, masts, and cable stays are equipped with a multitude of sensors to enable structural health monitoring. These are designed to detect the slightest movement in the Viaduct, and measure its resistance to wear-and-tear over time. Anemometers, accelerometers, inclinometers, and temperature sensors are all used for the instrumentation network.

Twelve fibre optic extensometers were installed in the base of pylon P2. Being the tallest of all, it is therefore under the most intense stress. These sensors detect movements on the order of a micrometre. Other extensometers, electrical this time, are distributed on top of P2 and P7. This apparatus is capable of taking up to 100 readings per second. In high winds, they continuously monitor the reactions of the Viaduct to extreme conditions. Accelerometers placed strategically on the road deck monitor the oscillations that can affect the metal structure. Displacements of the deck on the abutment level are measured to the nearest millimetre. The cable stays are also instrumented, and their ageing meticulously analysed. Additionally, two piezoelectric sensors gather traffic data: weight of vehicles, average speed, density of the flow of traffic, etc. This system can distinguish between fourteen different types of vehicle.

The data is transmitted by an Ethernet network to a computer in the IT room at the management building situated near the toll plaza.

=== Toll plaza ===
The toll plaza is on the A75 autoroute; the bridge toll booths and the buildings for the commercial and technical management teams are situated 4 kilometres (2.5 mi) north of the viaduct. The toll plaza is protected by a canopy in the shape of a leaf, formed from tendrilled concrete, using the ceracem process. Consisting of 53 elements (voussoirs), the canopy is 100 metres (330 ft) long and 28 metres (92 ft) wide. It weighs around 2,500 tonnes (2,500 long tons; 2,800 short tons).

The toll plaza can accommodate sixteen lanes of traffic, eight in each direction. At times of low traffic volume, the central booth is capable of servicing vehicles in both directions. A car park and viewing station, equipped with public toilets, is situated at each side of the toll plaza. The total cost was €20 million.

=== Rest area of Brocuéjouls ===
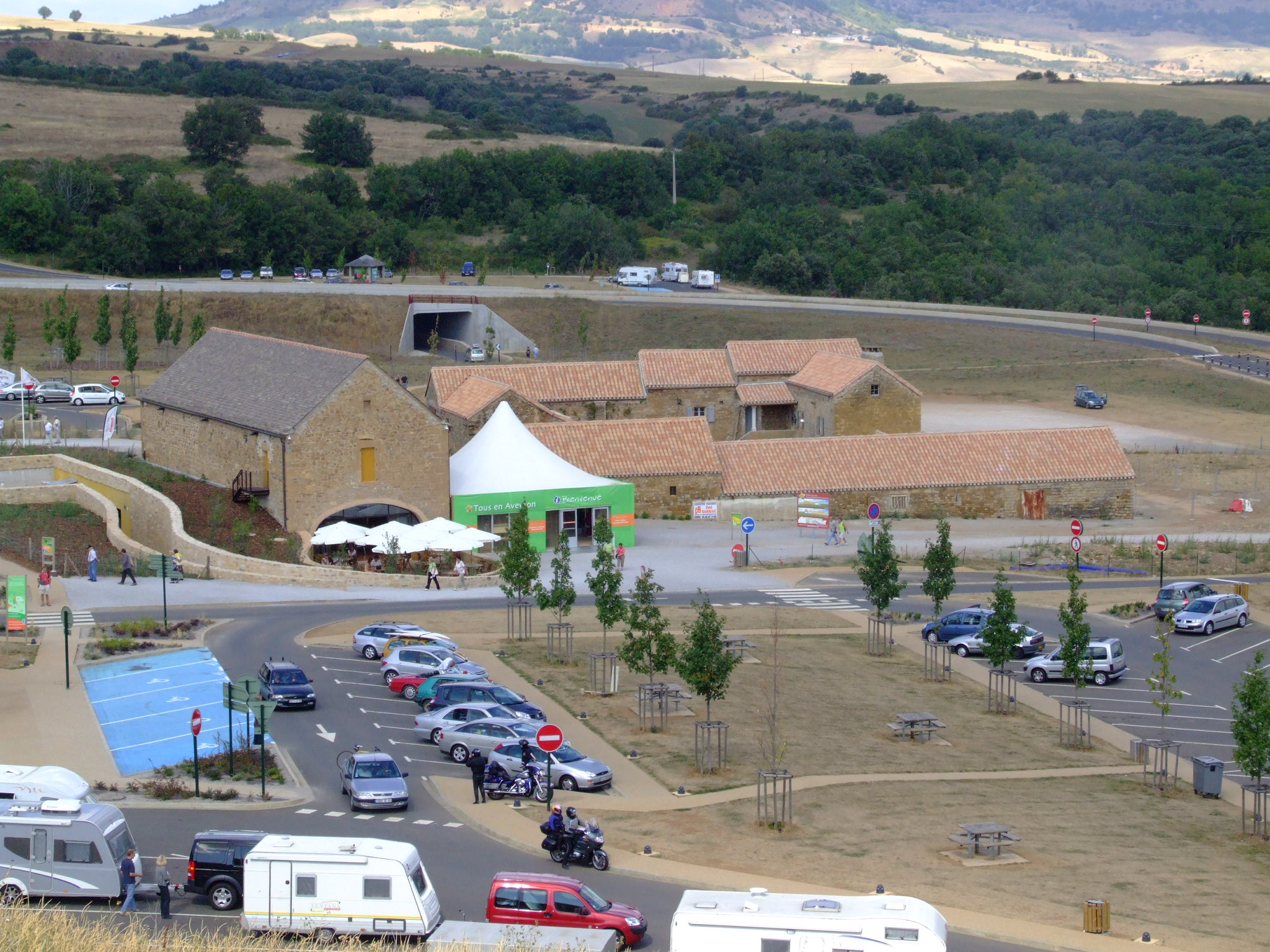
View of the rest area with the 'Ferme de Brocuéjouls'

Millau Viaduct as viewed from the A75 near the Aire du Viaduc de Millau, facing south

The rest area of Brocuéjouls, named Aire du Viaduc de Millau, is situated just north of the viaduct, and is centred on an old farm building named 'Ferme de Brocuéjouls'. It was inaugurated by the prefect of Aveyron, Chantal Jourdan, on 30 June 2006, after 7 months of works. The farm and its surroundings can accommodate entertainment and tourism promotion activities.

The cost of this work amounted to €5.8 million:

- €4.8 million of state funds for the realisation of the area (access roads, parking, rest area, toilets, etc.)
- €1 million for the restoration of the old farm building of Brocuéjouls (all two tranches)

=== Statistics ===
- 2,460 metres (8,070 ft): total length of the roadway
- 7: number of piers
- 77 metres (253 ft): height of Pier 7, the shortest
- 343 metres (1,125 ft): height of Pier 2, the tallest (245 metres or 804 feet at the roadway's level)
- 87 metres (285 ft): height of a mast
- 154: number of shrouds
- 270 metres (890 ft): average height of the roadway
- 4.20 metres (13 ft 9 in): thickness of the roadway
- 32.05 metres (105 ft 2 in): width of the roadway
- 85,000 cubic metres (111,000 cu yd): total volume of concrete used
- 290,000 tonnes (320,000 short tons): total weight of the bridge
- 10,000–25,000 vehicles: estimated daily traffic
- €11.20–13.70: typical automobile toll (price increasing in summer), as of February 2025
- 20 kilometres (12 mi): horizontal radius of curvature of the road deck
A comparison of the side elevation of the Millau Viaduct to the side elevations of some of the most notable bridges around the world on the same scale (see also interactive version)

== Impact and events ==
=== Pedestrian sporting events ===
Unusually for a bridge closed to pedestrians, a run took place in 2004, and another on 13 May 2007:

- December 2004 – 19,000 walkers and runners of the Three Bridge Walk had the privilege of crossing the bridge deck for the first time, but the walk was not authorised to go further than pylon P1; the bridge was still closed to traffic.
- 13 May 2007 – 10,496 runners took the departure of the race from Place de Mandarous, in the centre of Millau, to the southern end of the Viaduct. After starting on the northern side, they crossed the viaduct, then retraced their steps. Total distance: 23.7 kilometres (14.7 mi).

=== Events and popular culture ===
- In 2004, a fire started on the slope of the Causse Rouge because of a spark originating from a welder; some trees were destroyed in the fire.
- The speed limit on the bridge was reduced from 130 kilometres per hour (81 mph) to 110 kilometres per hour (68 mph) because tourists were slowing down to take photos. Soon after the bridge opened to traffic, cars were stopping on the hard shoulder so that travelers could view the landscape and the bridge.
- A postage stamp was designed by Sarah Lazarevic to commemorate the opening of the Viaduct.
- The Chinese transport minister at the time visited the bridge on the first anniversary of its opening. The commission was impressed by the technical prowess of the bridge's immense construction, but also by the legal and financial assembly of the Viaduct. However, according to the minister, he did not envisage building a counterpart in People's Republic of China.
- The cabinet of the governor of California Arnold Schwarzenegger, who envisaged the construction of a bridge in San Francisco Bay, asked the council of the town hall of Millau about the popularity of the construction of the viaduct.
- This bridge was featured in a scene of the 2007 film Mr. Bean's Holiday.
- The bridge also appeared in the ending of the console and PC versions of the third-person shooter video game James Bond 007: Blood Stone, where James Bond confronts the game's true antagonist.
- The hosts of the British motoring show Top Gear featured the bridge during Series 7, when they took a Ford GT, Pagani Zonda, and Ferrari F430 Spyder on a road trip across France to see the newly completed bridge.
- Richard Hammond, one of the above hosts on Top Gear, explored the engineering aspects in the construction of the Millau Viaduct in Series 2 of Richard Hammond's Engineering Connections.
- The bridge was featured in Series 2 of World's Greatest Bridges.
- Construction of the bridge was featured in the series How Did They Build That?

== See also ==
- World Architecture Survey
- List of bridges in France
- List of longest cable-stayed bridge spans
- List of bridges by length
- List of highest bridges in the world
- List of tallest bridges in the world
- Jiaxing-Shaoxing Sea Bridge
- Baluarte Bridge
- Pont de Normandie
- Rio-Antirrio Bridge
- Royal Gorge Bridge, in Colorado, United States.
