= Eiffel (company) =

French metal construction company

EIFFEL
- Industry: Construction
- Founded: 1866 by Gustave Eiffel
- Founder: Gustave Eiffel
- Headquarters: Colombes, France
- Key people: Jacques Huillard, Chairman
- Revenue: € 703 million (2009)
- Number of employees: 4,100
- Website: www.eiffel.fr

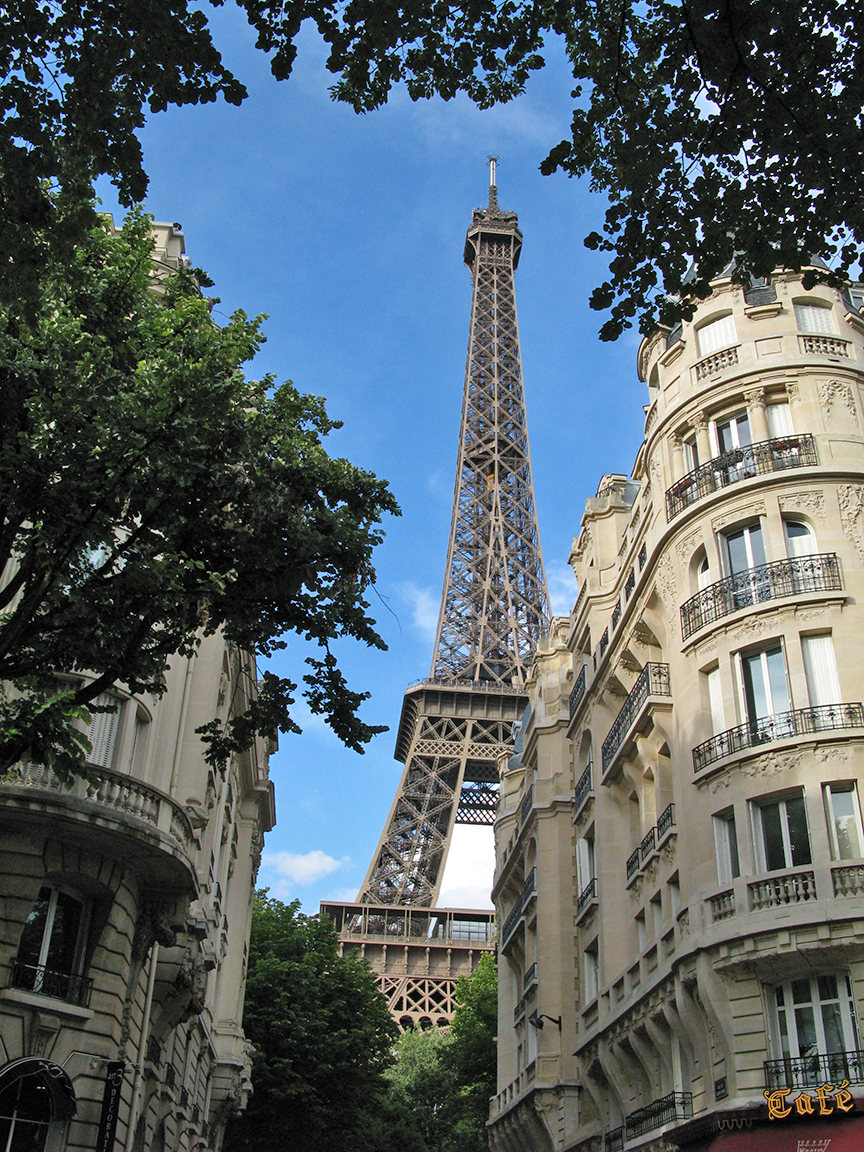
Eiffel Tower

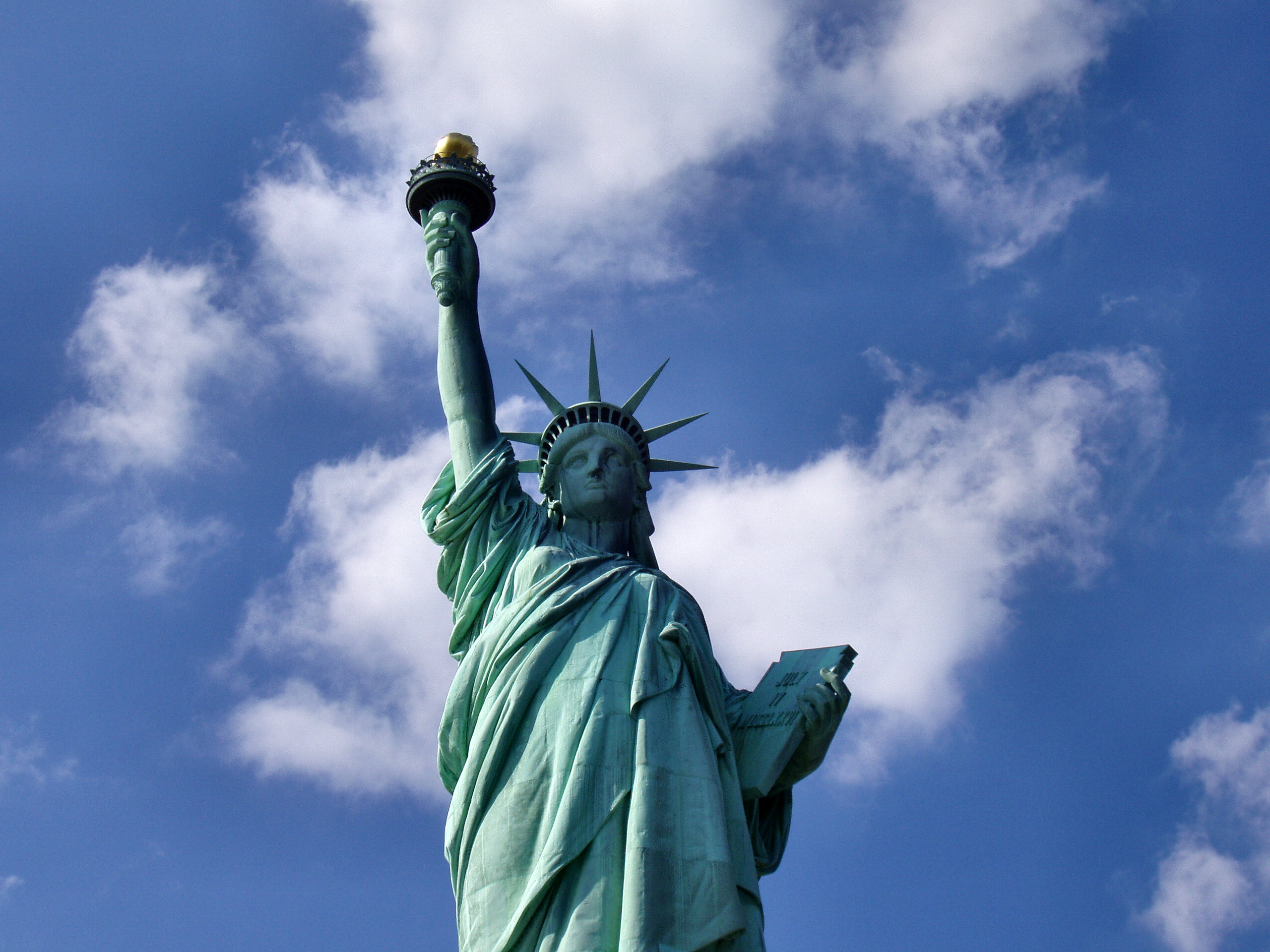
Statue of Liberty (Liberty Enlightening the World)

Eiffage Métal (previously Eiffel and French Eiffel Constructions métalliques) is part of the Eiffage group and the descendant of the engineering company Société des Établissements Eiffel founded by Gustave Eiffel, designer of the Eiffel Tower.

== History ==
On October 1, 1985, the company Eiffage Métal was created.

In 2012, Eiffel Constructions Métalliques changed its name to Eiffage Construction Métallique, following legal proceedings initiated in 2006 and a ruling in 2011.

== Notable structures ==
- Budapest-Nyugati Railway Terminal completed in 1877
- Eiffel Bridge, Ungheni, completed in 1877
- Maria Pia Bridge, completed in 1877
- Statue of Liberty (Liberty Enlightening the World) completed in 1878
- Garabit viaduct completed in 1884
- Colbert Bridge completed in 1888
- Eiffel Tower completed in 1889.
- Jiu Bridge, completed in 1897
- Tancarville Bridge completed in 1955.
- Louvre Pyramid completed in 1989.
- Normandy bridge completed in 1995.
- The Living Bridge completed 2007
- Millau Viaduct completed in 2002.
- Simone-de-Beauvoir foot bridge completed in 2006.
- It assisted with the construction and support of the glass wall of Columbia University's Alfred Lerner Hall, the largest in North America completed in 1999.
