= Saint-Georges-de-Luzençon =

Commune in Occitanie, France

- Commune
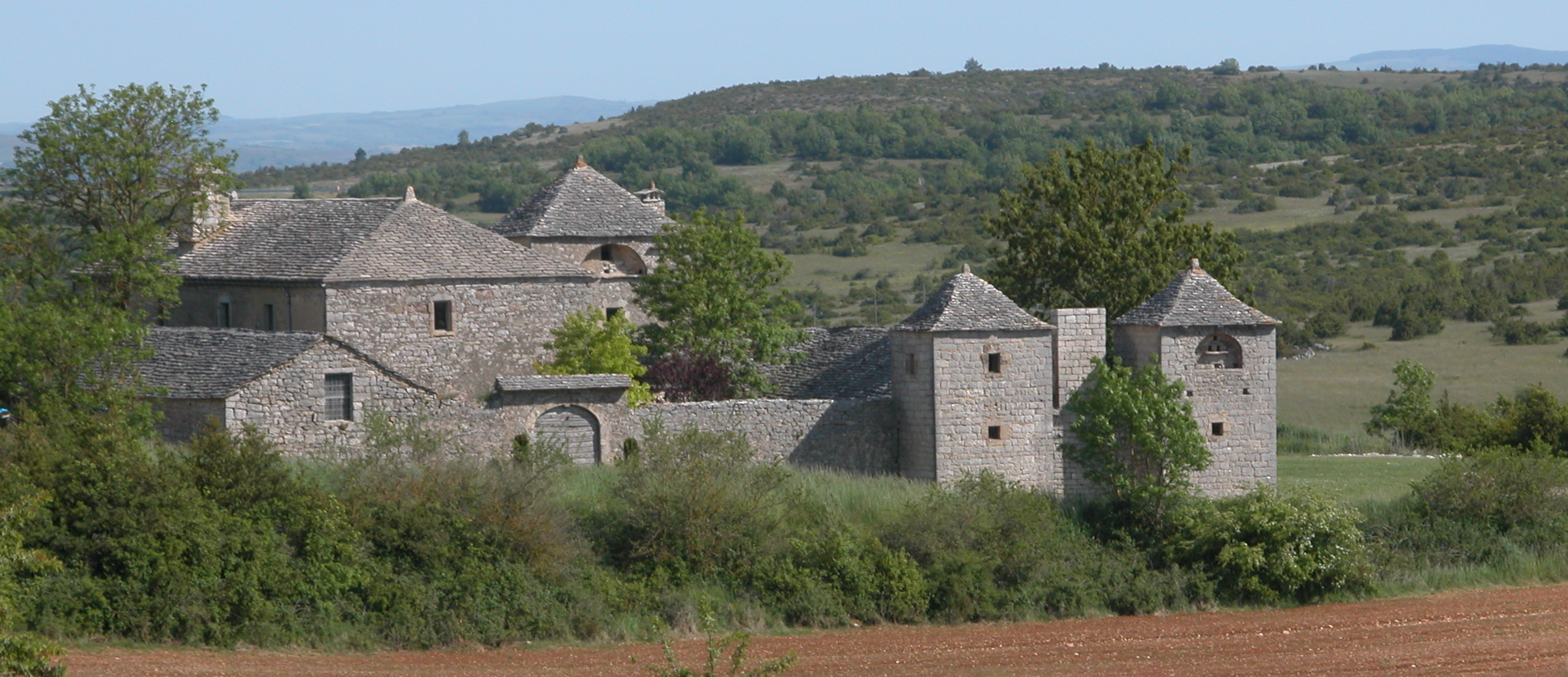
- Les Brouzes

- Coat of arms
- Location of Saint-Georges-de-Luzençon
- Location within France Location within Occitanie
- Coordinates: 44°03′55″N 2°59′11″E
- Country: France
- Region: Occitania
- Department: Aveyron
- Arrondissement: Millau
- Canton: Millau-1
- Intercommunality: Millau Grands Causses

Government
  - Mayor (2020–2026): Didier Cadaux
- Area^{1}: 47.73 km^{2} (18.43 sq mi)
- Elevation: 356 m (1,168 ft)
- Highest elevation: 782 m (2,566 ft)
- Lowest elevation: 340 m (1,120 ft)
- Population (2023): 1,565
  - Density: 32.79/km^{2} (84.92/sq mi)
- Time zone: UTC+01:00 (CET)
  - Summer (DST): UTC+02:00 (CEST)
- INSEE/Postal code: 12225 /12100
- ^{1} French Land Register data, which excludes lakes, ponds, glaciers > 1 km^{2} (0.386 sq mi or 247 acres) and river estuaries.

Saint-Georges-de-Luzençon (French pronunciation: [sɛ̃ ʒɔʁʒ də lyzɑ̃sɔ̃]; Occitan: Sent Jòrdi) is a commune in the Aveyron department in southern France. The commune was part of the Rouergue province, where people communicated with a variation of the Occitan language, Rouergat.

== Population ==
Historical population
Year	Pop.	±% p.a.
1968	827	—
1975	777	−0.89%
1982	1,027	+4.07%
1990	1,144	+1.36%
1999	1,301	+1.44%
2007	1,664	+3.12%
2012	1,514	−1.87%
2017	1,617	+1.33%
2023	1,565	−0.54%
Source: INSEE

Its inhabitants are called Saint-Georgiens in French.

== Geography ==
The territory of the commune is a part of the South Massif Central. The village itself is nestled in the Cernon valley along the D992 road. The hearth of the village is composed of stonework basements following the forms of the Middle Ages fortress. The main avenue, lately built, welcomes the totality of the commerces. Finally, most of the village surface is occupied by little houses grouped in lots, on a typical contemporary style. In spite of the fact that the village is distant of a dozen kilometers from the nearby city of Millau, it continues to welcome families by reason of its intermediate position with Millau, Saint Affrique and the Roquefort cheese factories in Roquefort-sur-Soulzon.

== History ==
Old settlement : Dolmens, fragments of pottery from the 4th century, barbarian cemetery in Briadels. Territory exchanged between the Rodez bishop and the Toulouse count, devastated by the Protestants of Las Ribes in the 16th century, and the ones of the Rohan duke in the 17th.

== See also ==
- Communes of the Aveyron department
