= Virlogeux =

Virlogeux is a surname. Notable people with the surname include:

- Henri Virlogeux (1924–1995), French actor
- Michel Virlogeux (born 1946), French structural engineer
