= The Living Bridge =

Bridge in University of Limerick

The Living Bridge An Droichead Beo
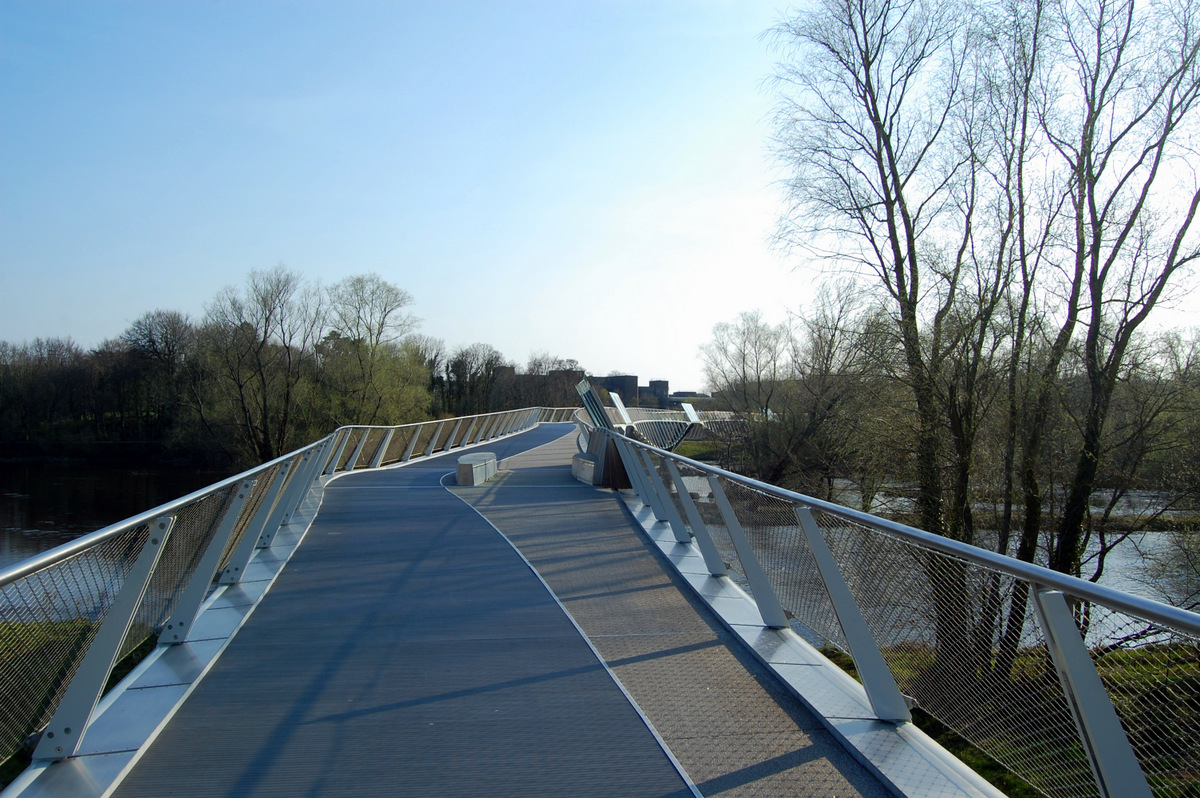
- The Living Bridge over the River Shannon on the UL campus
- Coordinates: 52.6764°N 8.5706°W
- Carries: Pedestrians
- Crosses: River Shannon
- Locale: University of Limerick

Characteristics
- Design: Arup Engineers & Wilkinson Eyre Architects
- Total length: 350m

History
- Constructed by: Eiffel Constructions Metalliques
- Opened: 2007

The Living Bridge (Irish: An Droichead Beo) is a pedestrian bridge across the River Shannon linking the University of Limerick's premises in County Limerick and County Clare.

The bridge was designed by Arup Engineers and Wilkinson Eyre Architects to provide social and cultural space to encourage pedestrians to rest a while as they cross along the gently curved structure. At this point on the Shannon it is wide and shallow with many wooded islands which provide varied views and support for the piers. The deck is supported by two underslung catenary cables. Financed through a Public-private partnership, construction was undertaken by Eiffel Constructions Metalliques and completed in November 2007 at a cost of €12 million. At 350 metres it is the longest pedestrian bridge in Ireland.

== Awards and commendations ==
RIBA European Awards and Institution of Structural Engineers winner structural awards 2008 (Pedestrian Bridges). French Steel Construction Syndicate declared it as the most beautiful steel work (Bridges Category) in 2008.
