= Comprégnac =

Commune in Occitanie, France

- Commune
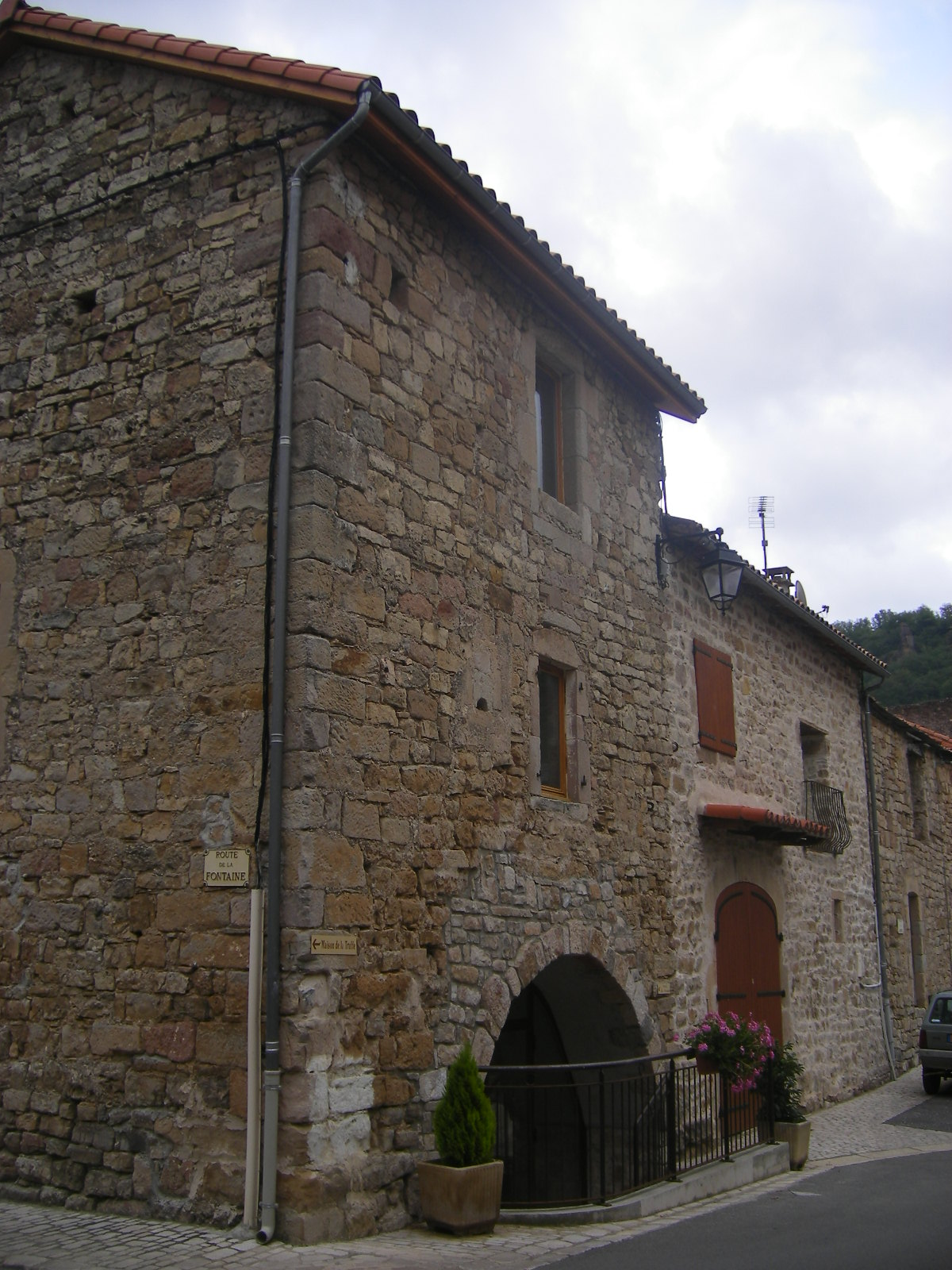
- Houses in Comprégnac

- Coat of arms
- Location of Comprégnac
- Location within France Location within Occitanie
- Coordinates: 44°05′01″N 2°57′43″E
- Country: France
- Region: Occitania
- Department: Aveyron
- Arrondissement: Millau
- Canton: Millau-1
- Intercommunality: Millau Grands Causses

Government
  - Mayor (2021–2026): Olivier Julien
- Area^{1}: 11.09 km^{2} (4.28 sq mi)
- Elevation: 335 m (1,099 ft)
- Highest elevation: 701 m (2,300 ft)
- Lowest elevation: 340 m (1,120 ft)
- Population (2023): 227
  - Density: 20.5/km^{2} (53.0/sq mi)
- Time zone: UTC+01:00 (CET)
  - Summer (DST): UTC+02:00 (CEST)
- INSEE/Postal code: 12072 /12100
- ^{1} French Land Register data, which excludes lakes, ponds, glaciers > 1 km^{2} (0.386 sq mi or 247 acres) and river estuaries.

Comprégnac (French pronunciation: [kɔ̃pʁeɲak]; Occitan: Comprenhac) is a commune in the Aveyron department in southern France.

The village of Peyre is part of the commune of Comprégnac. It belongs to The most beautiful villages of France association.

== Population ==
Historical population
Year	Pop.	±% p.a.
1968	141	—
1975	114	−2.99%
1982	133	+2.23%
1990	178	+3.71%
1999	215	+2.12%
2007	241	+1.44%
2012	236	−0.42%
2017	249	+1.08%
2023	227	−1.53%
Source: INSEE

== See also ==
- Communes of the Aveyron department
