= Creissels =

Commune in Occitanie, France

- Commune
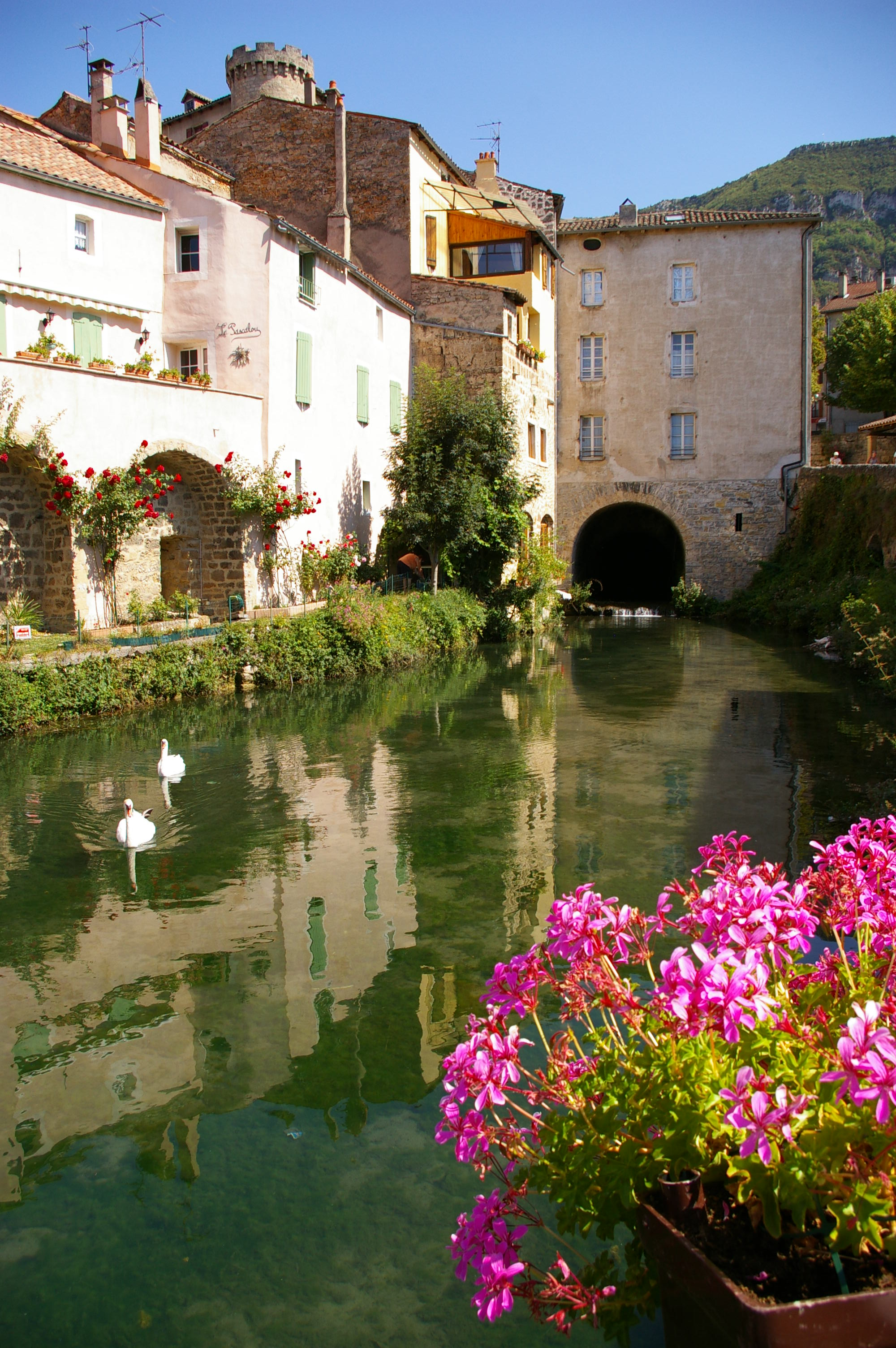
- The river in Creissels

- Coat of arms
- Location of Creissels
- Location within France Location within Occitanie
- Coordinates: 44°05′16″N 3°03′57″E
- Country: France
- Region: Occitania
- Department: Aveyron
- Arrondissement: Millau
- Canton: Millau-1
- Intercommunality: Millau Grands Causses

Government
  - Mayor (2020–2026): Jean-Louis Calvet
- Area^{1}: 28.19 km^{2} (10.88 sq mi)
- Elevation: 438 m (1,437 ft)
- Highest elevation: 808 m (2,651 ft)
- Lowest elevation: 340 m (1,120 ft)
- Population (2023): 1,568
  - Density: 55.62/km^{2} (144.1/sq mi)
- Time zone: UTC+01:00 (CET)
  - Summer (DST): UTC+02:00 (CEST)
- INSEE/Postal code: 12084 /12100
- ^{1} French Land Register data, which excludes lakes, ponds, glaciers > 1 km^{2} (0.386 sq mi or 247 acres) and river estuaries.

Creissels is a commune in the Aveyron department in southern France.

== Population ==
Historical population
Year	Pop.	±% p.a.
1968	936	—
1975	1,291	+4.70%
1982	1,326	+0.38%
1990	1,401	+0.69%
1999	1,501	+0.77%
2007	1,495	−0.05%
2012	1,558	+0.83%
2017	1,591	+0.42%
2023	1,568	−0.24%
Source: INSEE

== See also ==
- Millau Viaduct
- Communes of the Aveyron department
