= Hôtel de Ville, Millau =

Town hall in Millau, France

Hôtel de Ville
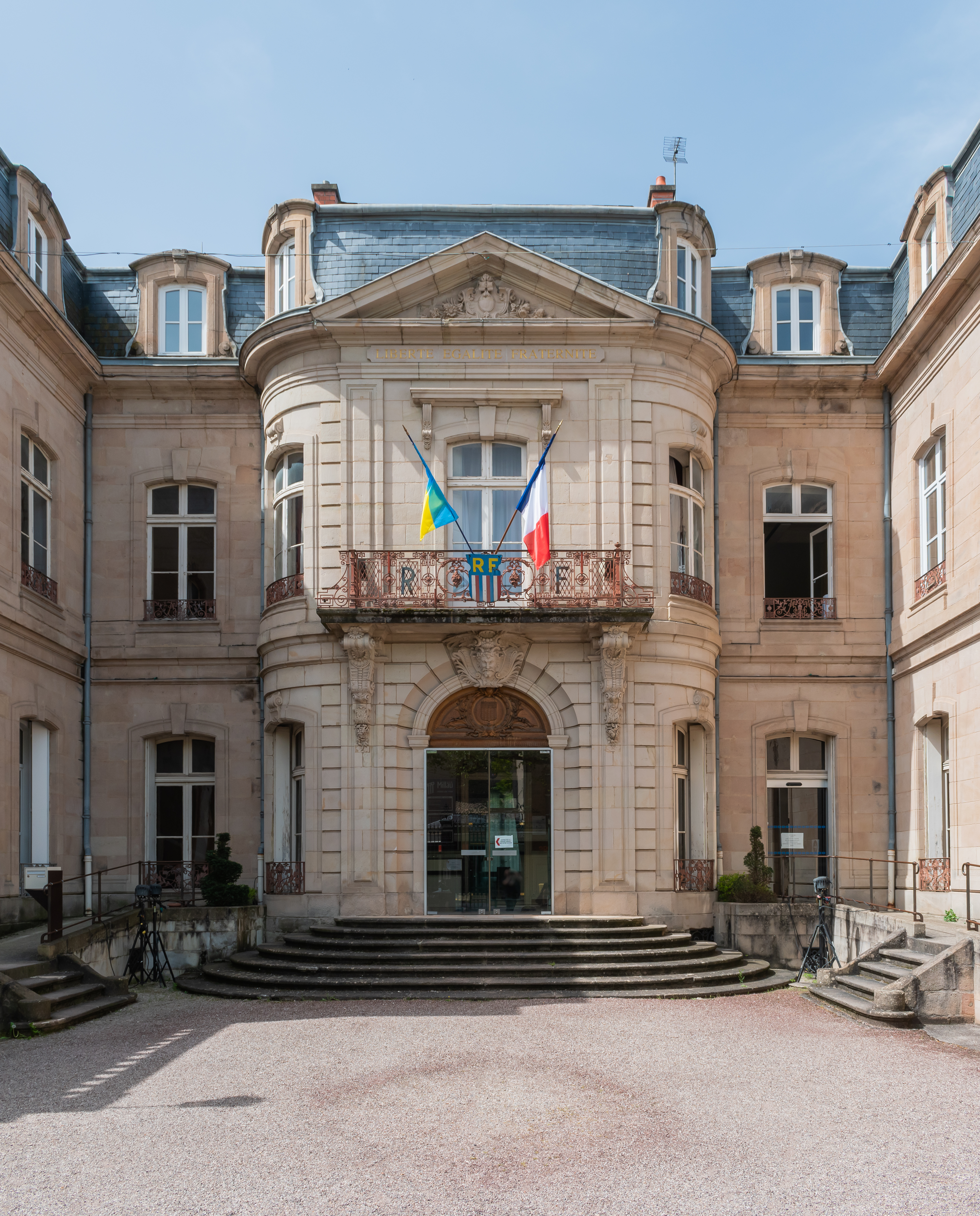
- The main frontage of the Hôtel de Ville in April 2022
- Interactive map of the Hôtel de Ville area

General information
- Type: City hall
- Architectural style: Neoclassical style
- Location: Millau, France
- Coordinates: 44.1006°N 3.0776°E
- Completed: 1876

Design and construction
- Architect: Louis-Alphonse Corvetto

The Hôtel de Ville (French pronunciation: [otɛl də vil], City Hall) is a municipal building in Millau, Aveyron, in southern France, standing on Avenue de la République.

== History ==
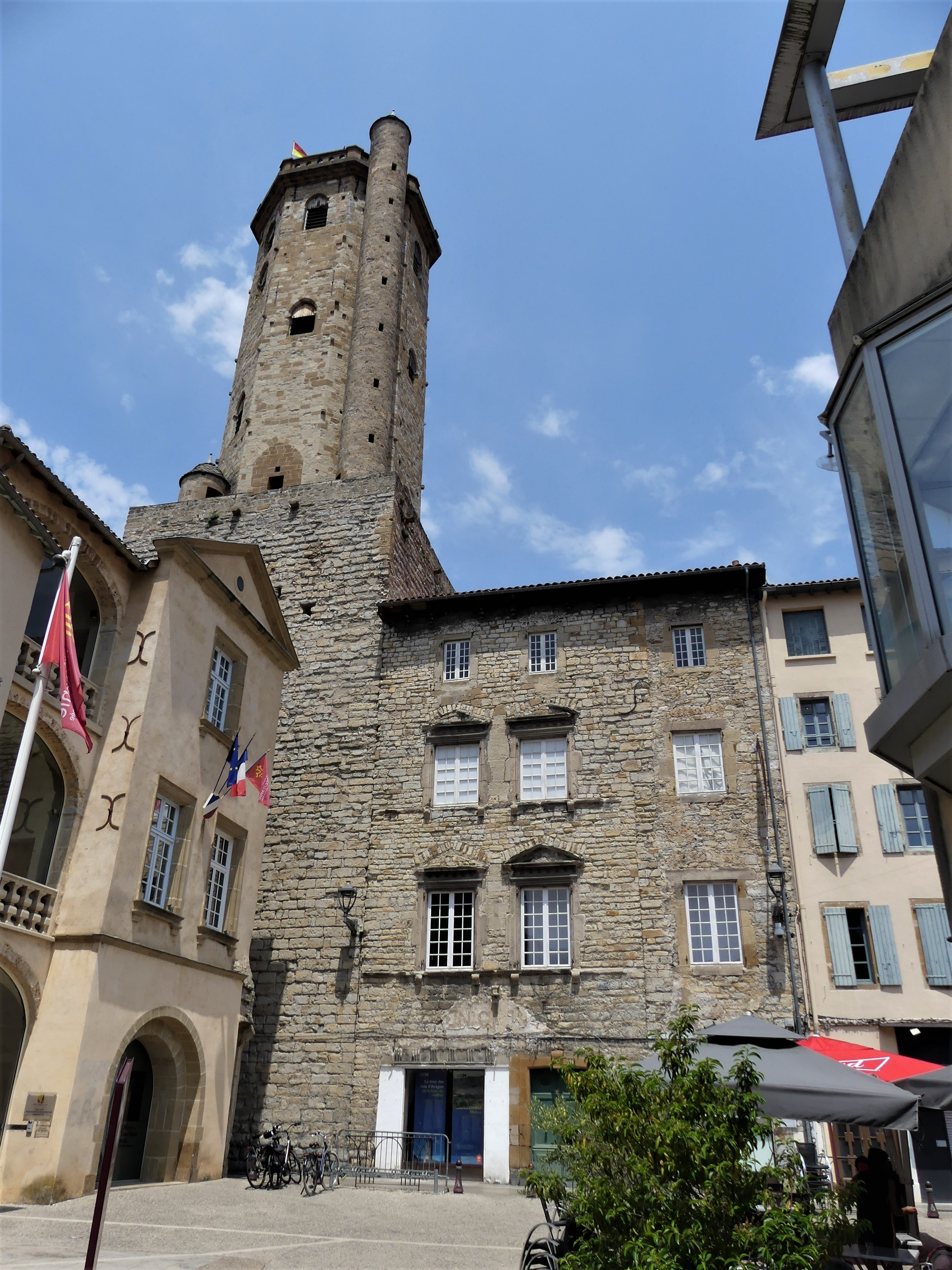
Hôtel de Tauriac

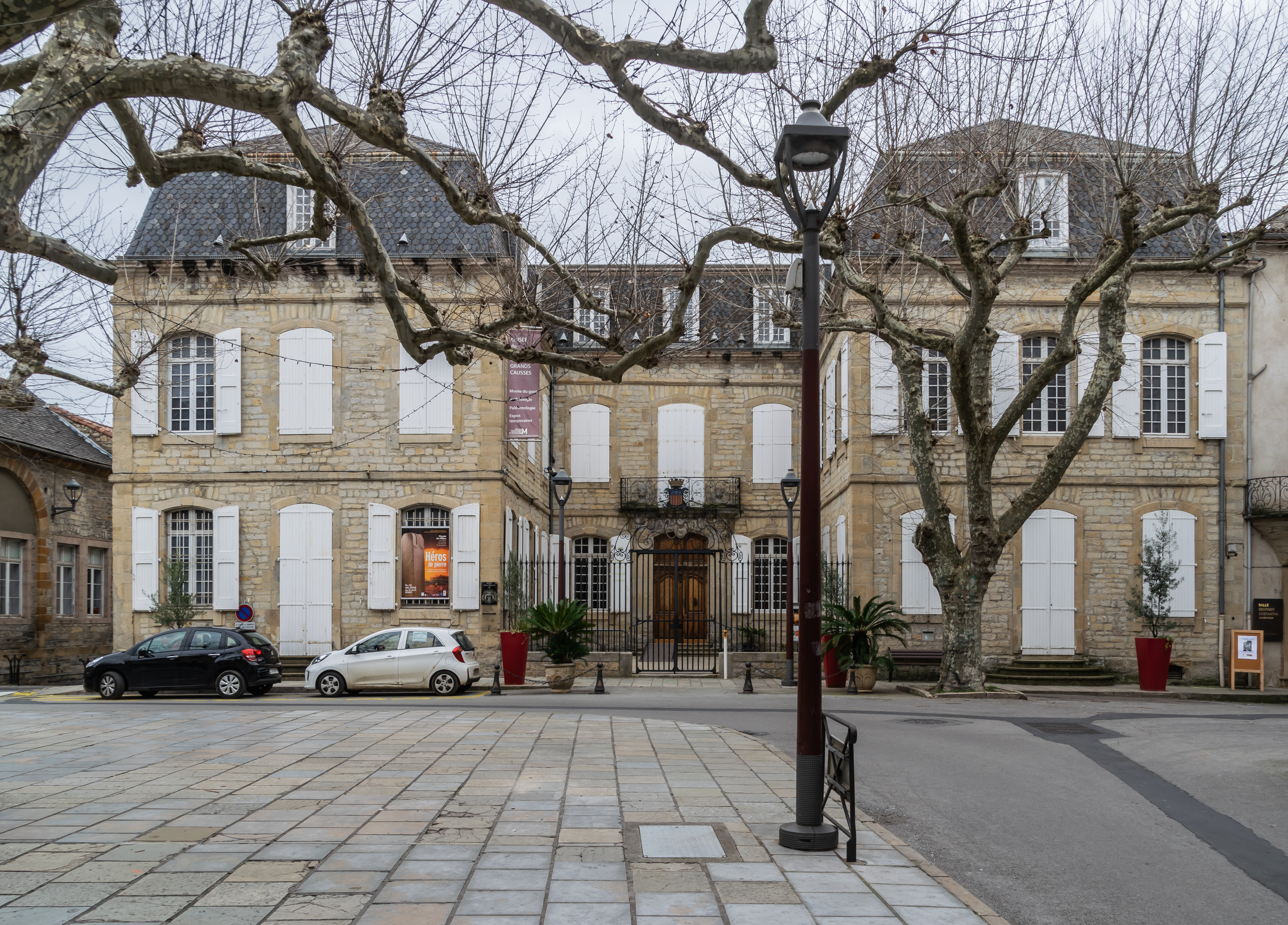
Hôtel de Pégayrolles

=== Hôtel de Tauriac ===
Following the French Revolution, the new town council initially met in a house on what is now Place Emma-Calvé. This arrangement continued until 1805 when the council moved to the Hôtel de Tauriac on Rue Droite. Hôtel de Tauriac had been commissioned by the seigneur of the town, Jacques de Tauriac, in 1633. It incorporated the great hall of the former Palace of the Kings of Aragon as well as a tall bell tower dating from the 12th century.

=== Hôtel de Pégayrolles ===
In the mid-19th century, the council led by the mayor, Achille Villa, decided to acquire a more substantial property for municipal use. The building they selected was the Hôtel de Pégayrolles on the east side of what is now Place du Maréchal Foch. The building had been commissioned by the president of the Parlement of Toulouse, Jacques Julien de Pégayrolles. Construction work started in 1738 although progress was delayed by disputes with neighbours. It was designed in the neoclassical style, built in ashlar stone and was completed in 1745.

The design involved a main block of three bays together with two wings which were projected forward forming a courtyard. The central bay featured a segmental-headed doorway flanked by pilasters surmounted by masks; it had a keystone with a female head. There was a segmental-headed French door with an iron balcony on the first floor. The rest of the building was fenestrated by segmental-headed windows. The town council acquired the building for FFR 52,000 in 1856.

After it was no longer needed for municipal use, the Hôtel de Pégayrolles accommodated a public library and a music school as well as the Centre de Recherche et d'Enseignement Artistique (Center for Artistic Research and Education). After the Centre de Recherche et d'Enseignement Artistique relocated to Boulevard Sadi-Carnot in 1987, the building accommodated the Musée de Millau et des Grands Causses (Museum of Millau and the Grands Causses).

=== Banque Villa ===
In 1937, following significant population growth, the council led by the mayor, René Caussignac, again decided to move to a more substantial property. The building they selected was the Banque Villa on Avenue de la République. It was a typical hôtel particulier with a grand gate, a grand courtyard and two ornate façades. The building had been commissioned by the former mayor, Achille Villa, in 1872. It had been designed by Louis-Alphonse Corvetto in the neoclassical style, built in ashlar stone and completed in 1876.

The design involved a main block of three bays together with two wings which were projected forward forming a courtyard. The central bay, which was projected forward with curved corners, featured a round headed doorway on the ground floor, a segmental-headed French door with a cornice on the first floor and a pediment at roof level. The Villa family's banking business, Banque Villa et Cie, founded by François Villa in 1807, got into financial difficulties during the Great Depression in the 1930s and the council took the opportunity to buy the house. The town instituted a major programme of conversion works involving the creation of the Bureau du Maire (mayor's parlour) and the Salle du Conseil (council chamber). A further programme of works to refurbish the entrance hall was undertaken at a cost of €99,500 and was completed in May 2024.
