= Peyre, Aveyron =

Coordinates: 44°5′27″N 2°59′55″E

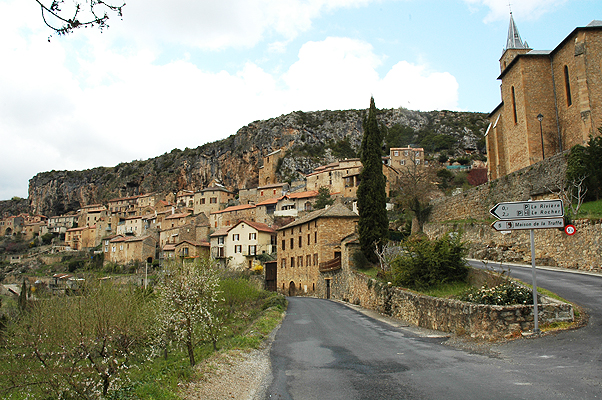
The village of Peyre

Peyre (French) or Pèira in Occitan is a village in the Aveyron département, in southern France. Formerly an independent commune, it is part of the commune of Comprégnac since 1830. It is a member of Les Plus Beaux Villages de France (The Most Beautiful Villages of France) Association.
