= Michel Virlogeux =

French civil engineer (born 1946)

Michel Virlogeux FREng FRSE
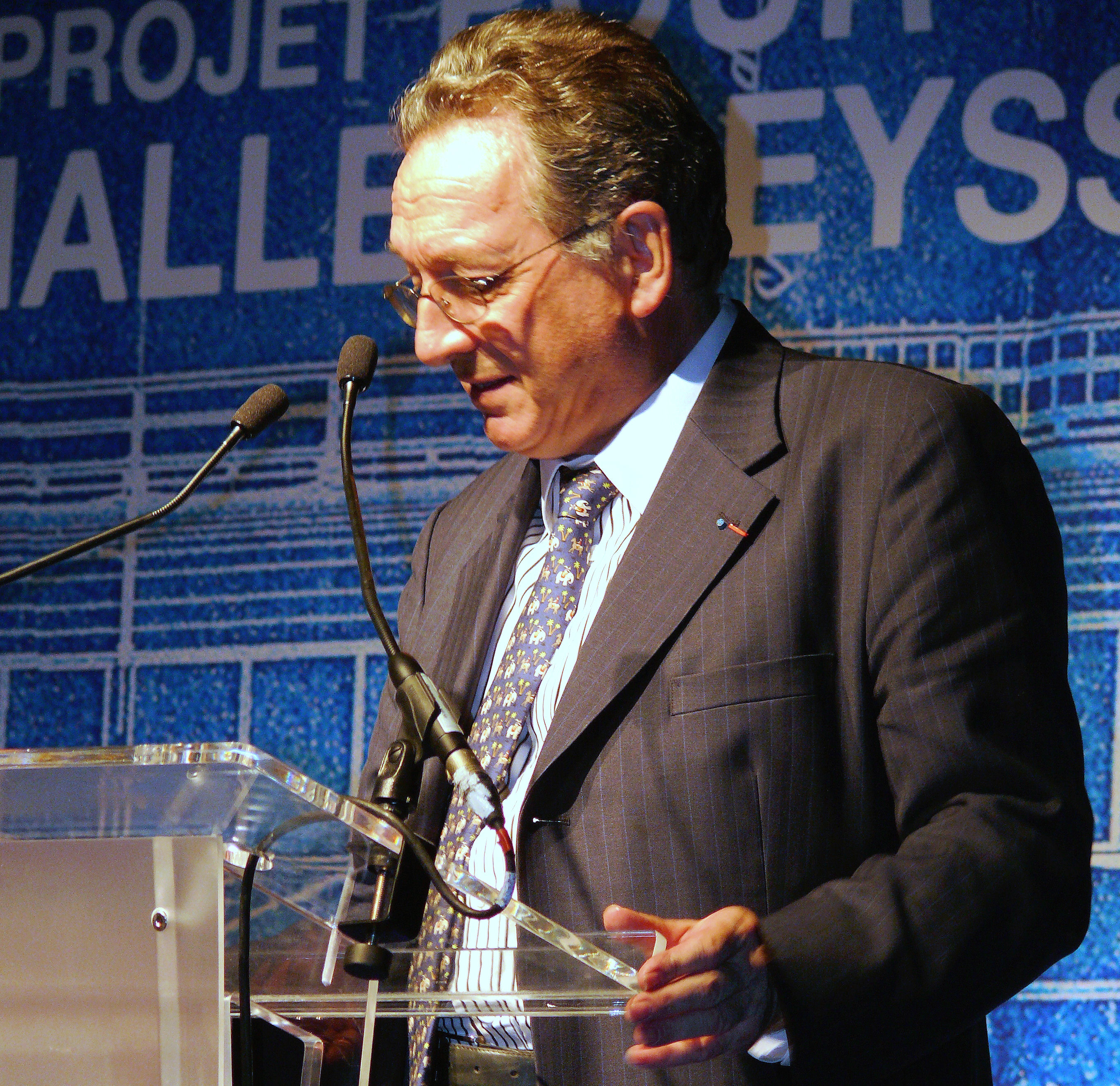
- Michel Virlogeux (2011)
- Born: 7 July 1946 (age 80); Vichy, Allier, Auvergne, France
- Education: Prytanée National Militaire; École Polytechnique; École Nationale des Ponts et Chaussées
- Engineering career
- Discipline: Civil engineer
- Institutions: French Association of Civil Engineering (AFGC) 'Fédération Internationale de Précontrainte' (FIP) 'Fédération Internationale du Béton' (FIB); Institution of Structural Engineers
- Projects: Millau Viaduct, France; Vasco da Gama Bridge, Lisbon, Portugal; Yavuz Sultan Selim Bridge, Istanbul, Turkey
- Awards: IStructE Gold Medal; IABSE Award of Merit; Fritz Leonhardt Prize; FREng (2012)

Michel Virlogeux (born 1946, Vichy, Allier, Auvergne) is a French structural engineer and bridge specialist.

== Career ==
Virlogeux graduated from the École Polytechnique in 1967 and from the École Nationale des Ponts et Chaussées in 1970. From 1970 to 1973 he served in Tunisia on road projects and at the same time gained his Engineering Doctorate from the Pierre et Marie Curie University (also known as "Paris 6"). In January 1974 he joined the Bridge Department of SETRA, the technical service of the French Highway Administration.

In 1980 he became Head of the Large Concrete Bridge Division, and in 1987 of the large Bridge Division, Steel and Concrete. During twenty years he designed more than 100 bridges, including the Normandy Bridge which held the world record for longest cable-stayed bridge for four years. In 1995 he left the French Administration and set up as independent consulting engineer; his major achievements include his participation in the construction of the 'Second Tagus Crossing', the Vasco da Gama Bridge in Lisbon, and the design of the Millau Viaduct in France. Several of his bridges have received architectural awards.

Since 1977, Virlogeux has been a part-time professor of structural analysis at the École Nationale des Ponts et Chaussées and at the Centre des Hautes Études de la Construction in Paris. He also has been very active in technical associations such as the French Association of Civil Engineering (AFGC), 1974–1995; the Fédération Internationale de Précontrainte (FIP) (President 1996); the Fédération Internationale du Béton (FIB); first President in 1998 after the merger with the Comité Européen du Béton (CEB).

== Awards ==
A member of the International Association for Bridge and Structural Engineering (IABSE) since 1974, Virlogeux received the inaugural IABSE Prize in Venice in 1983.

He has received many other international awards, which include the 'Award of Excellence of the Engineering News Record' (1995), the 'Gold Medal of the Institution of Structural Engineers' (1979), the Gold Medal of the Institution of Civil Engineers (2005) the 'Gustave Magnel Medal' (1999) and the 'Fritz Leonhardt Prize' (also the first year that it was awarded). He is a member of the French Academy of Technology.

He received the 2003 IABSE Award of Merit in Structural Engineering in recognition of "his major contributions leading to very significant progress in the field of civil engineering, in particular through the development of external prestressing, landmark cable-stayed bridges and composite structures". The Award Presentation took place during the Opening of the IABSE Symposium 'Structures for High-Speed Railway Transportation', Antwerp, Belgium on 27 August 2003. The presentation was presented by Manabu Ito, President of IABSE.

In 2010 he was invited to deliver the MacMillan Memorial Lecture to the Institution of Engineers and Shipbuilders in Scotland. He chose the subject "The Design of Long Span Bridges".

He was appointed an International Fellow of the Royal Academy of Engineering in 2012 and Corresponding Fellow of the Royal Society of Edinburgh in 2013.

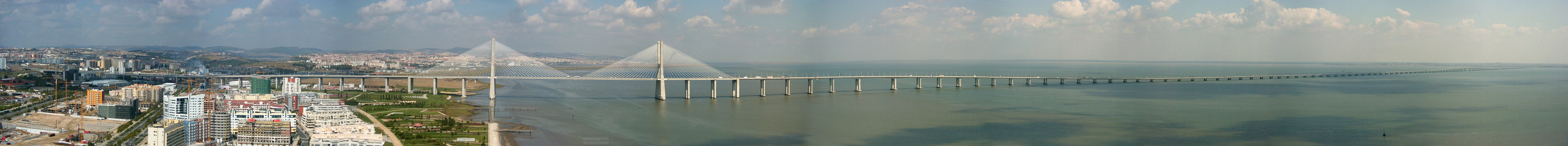
View of Vasco da Gama Bridge, Lisbon.
