= Millau =

Subprefecture and commune in Occitanie, France

- Subprefecture and commune
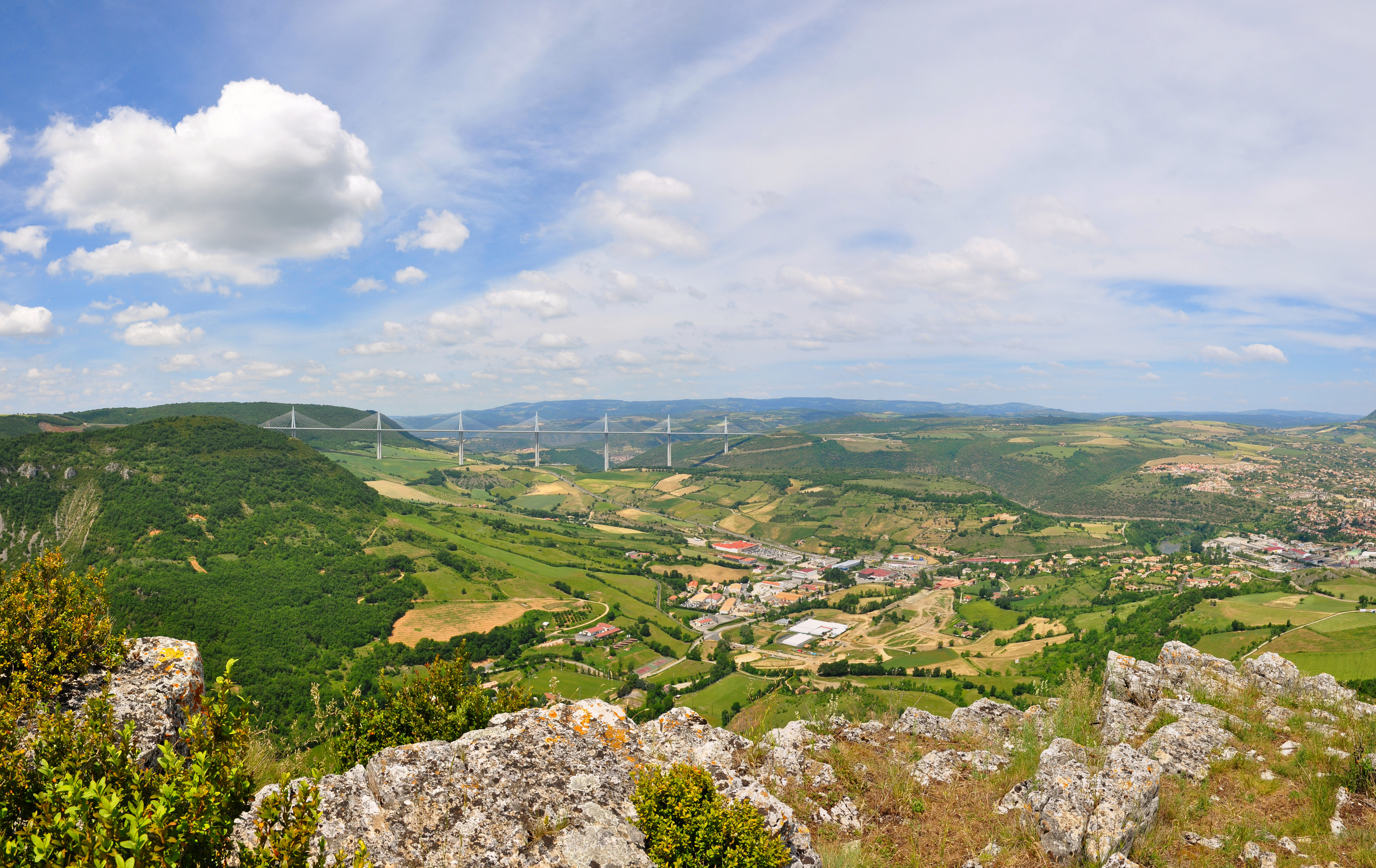
- The Millau Viaduct as seen from Larzac

- Flag Coat of arms
- Location of Millau
- Location within France Location within Occitanie
- Coordinates: 44°05′55″N 3°04′42″E
- Country: France
- Region: Occitania
- Department: Aveyron
- Arrondissement: Millau
- Canton: Millau-1 and 2
- Intercommunality: Millau Grands Causses

Government
  - Mayor (2020–2026): Emmanuelle Gazel
- Area^{1}: 168.23 km^{2} (64.95 sq mi)
- Elevation: 379 m (1,243 ft)
- Highest elevation: 888 m (2,913 ft)
- Lowest elevation: 340 m (1,120 ft)
- Population (2023): 22,044
  - Density: 131.03/km^{2} (339.38/sq mi)
- Demonym(s): Millavois (masc.), Millavoise(s) (fem.) (fr)
- Time zone: UTC+01:00 (CET)
  - Summer (DST): UTC+02:00 (CEST)
- INSEE/Postal code: 12145 /12100
- ^{1} French Land Register data, which excludes lakes, ponds, glaciers > 1 km^{2} (0.386 sq mi or 247 acres) and river estuaries.

Millau (French pronunciation: [mijo]; Occitan: Milhau pronounced [miˈʎaw]) is a commune in Occitania, France. Located at the confluence of the Tarn and Dourbie rivers, the town is a subprefecture of the Aveyron department.

Millau is known for its Viaduct, glove industry and several nearby natural landmarks such as the Gorges du Tarn. The surrounding Causses are renowned for their pastoral traditions and cheese production, including Roquefort. In this regard, the region has been part of the Causses and Cévennes World Heritage Site since 2011.

== History ==
The town dates back nearly 3000 years when it was situated on the Granède hills which dominate the town. In the second or first century B.C, it would move to the alluvial plain on the left bank of the Tarn. The plain gave the town its Gallic name of Condatomagus (Contado meaning confluence and magus for the market). The site of Condatomagus was identified in the 19th century by Dieudonné Rey; it was close to the major earthenware centre in the Roman Empire, La Graufesenque. This is where luxury ceramics such as red terra sigillata were made. (Note: In Gaul, in Italy, in Germany (Germany), in the Iberian Peninsula (Spain, Portugal), etc; See Histoire et secrets oubliés, Association of the Millau Museum's friends) Despite major new developments in the late twentieth and early twenty-first centuries, the centre of the old Roman and medieval town on the opposite (left) bank of the Tarn remains poorly excavated, and the newly renovated Maison du Peuple, almost on the site of the old Roman forum, saw no archaeological dig prior to the excavation of the new, very deep, foundations. The local museum sits almost adjacent to this site.

By the second century A.D. trade had collapsed from competition, and subsequent barbarian invasions during the fourth and fifth centuries saw the town relocate to the opposite bank, changing its name to Amiliavum, then to Milhau en Rouergat (in the Millhau language), then to the French Millhau.

By the ninth century the town had grown. It a seat of viguerie, a mediaeval administrative court, and a centre for the production of lambskin gloves. Ramparts surrounded the town. The tenth and eleventh centuries saw the creation of the Viscount of Millau and subsequently passed to the Counts of Provence, the Counts of Barcelona and eventually, in 1112, to the father of the future King of Aragon, Béranger III following his marriage to the daughter of the Viscount of Millau. In 1187, the King of Aragon grants him the seal and communal freedom of Provence by Consular Charter. A consulate was thus created, and was responsible for administering the city to raise taxes and to apply justice. In 1271, Millau passed to the crown of the kings of France.

In 1361, during the Hundred Years War, the city came under English rule. The return to peace in the fifteenth century gave the city an economic boost. Louis XI connected Millau to the crown in 1476 by letters patent. At this time, the town was part of the former province of Rouergue where local people spoke Rouergat, a dialect of the Occitan language.

In the Middle Ages the town had one of the main mediaeval bridges across the Tarn river. It had 17 arches, but after one poorly maintained arch collapsed in the 18th century, the bridge was mostly demolished. Only one arch remains, with a mill that is now an art gallery, as testament to this significant trading route from north to south across pre-Renaissance France.

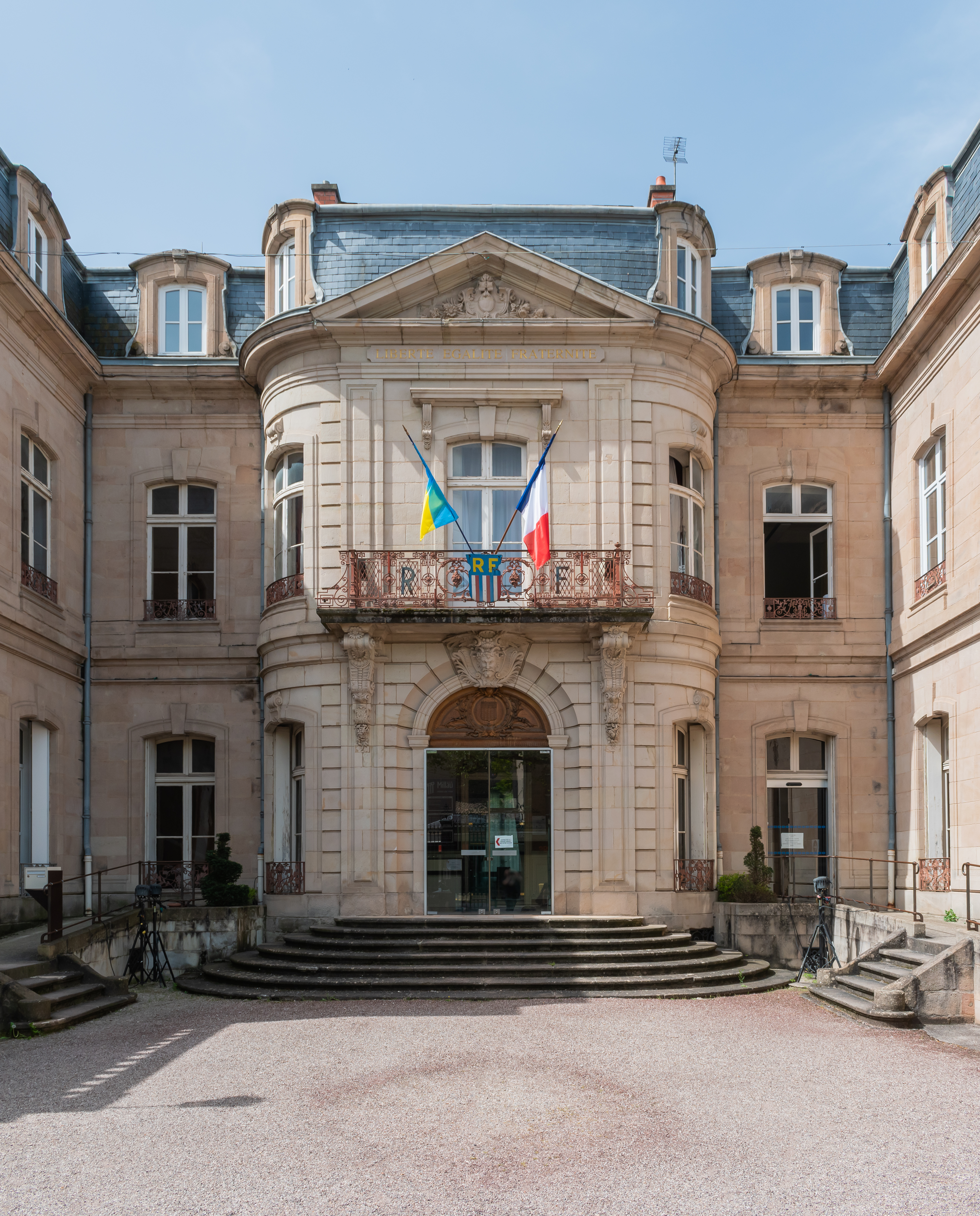
The Hôtel de Ville

The Hôtel de Ville was completed in 1876.

The 19th century saw the development of the glove industry. Major urban development works were carried out during the Second Empire at the instigation of banker Achille Villa, mayor from 1855 to 1865. In the first half of the 20th century, more than half of the town's inhabitants made their living from the leather industry. Millau was affected rather late by the Great Depression. In 1934, the Villa bank went bankrupt. The town was then paralysed by a six-month general strike in the winter of 1934-1935, following a 25-30% cut in workers' wages. But the glove industry remained resilient, before starting its decline in the 1960s.

The town gained national notoriety in the 1970s as part of the Larzac struggle. In 1999, local anti-globalisation activists destroyed the building site of a McDonald's restaurant. They were protesting against the US overtax on the import of Roquefort, in retaliation for the European Union refusing the import of US hormone-treated meat. It was also an opportunity to condemn fast food, Americanization, and the spread of GMO. The McDonald's was quickly completed and José Bové, one of the leaders of the dismantling operation, was sentenced to a short prison term.

The Millau Viaduct opened in 2004, eliminating traffic jams from the town centre.

=== Heraldry ===
The traditional arms of the city of Millau are "Gold with four pallets gules, a chief azure three gold fleurs-de-lis."

This has been the arms of the Crown of Aragon since 1187, but since 1271 surmounted with the leader of France (Azure three fleurs de lys) indicating that this is a bonne ville (good town), i.e. a commune reporting directly to the king. The city itself was administered through elected consuls – like Toulouse and its sheriffs – while the king was the sole and direct lord. Few cities in France enjoyed such an autonomous regime.

== Geography ==
The territory of this town lies across a southern portion of the Massif Central. It covers a large area of some 16,823 hectares (41,570 acres), which makes it the 25th largest metropolitan town in France. The municipality lies at the heart of the Grands Causses, a part of the Causse Rouge (east of the plateau Lévézou), and part of Larzac as well as part of the Black Causse. The city county seat is located in the lower part of the town, in a large depression at the confluence of the Tarn and Dourbie, at an altitude of about 340 m.

The territory surrounding the town of Millau is characterized by livestock production and the maintaining of natural grasslands, fields and temporary pastures. A multitude of gorges, ravines and defiles give the landscape its character. These predominantly agricultural rural areas like the rest of this fragile region, are protected by the Regional Natural Park of Grands Causses.

The area's flora consists of over 2000 species. There is a triple-leaved asparagus, Montpellier aphyllanthe, honeysuckle from the Etruria region of Italy. During the summer, the highest land of the municipality does not retain rain water and becomes arid. Some game in the area is protected and regulated by the hunting missions which gather quails, Hobby falcon, hawks, lizards, deer, wild boars, deer and mountain sheep.

The expansion of the bed of the river Tarn in the city and the creation of a raw discharge linked to its expansion has slowed and lowered the level of the river that now sees the proliferation of aquatic buttercup which is reveling in the stagnant water. This has also led to a decline in wild populations of brown trout in this sector. Also waterproofing concrete and paving large areas has increased significantly water from rain discharged directly to the river inducing a phenomenon called "flush" that is quite destructive to aquatic fauna and the banks.

=== Climate ===
There are three distinct climatic effects felt in the region. In spring and autumn, the westerly winds and southwest produce an oceanic climate. In summer, winds from the southeast predominate and the weather is more Mediterranean, but these winds can also disrupt the normal course of the season at any time of the year. In winter, northern winds submit this country to the rigors of continental climate.

Climate data for Millau (Saint-Affrique), elevation 365 m (1,198 ft), (1981–1995 normals, extremes 1951–1995)
Month	Jan	Feb	Mar	Apr	May	Jun	Jul	Aug	Sep	Oct	Nov	Dec	Year
Record high °C (°F)	17.8 (64.0)	24.0 (75.2)	26.8 (80.2)	29.6 (85.3)	33.0 (91.4)	38.0 (100.4)	40.0 (104.0)	39.5 (103.1)	37.0 (98.6)	30.0 (86.0)	23.8 (74.8)	20.0 (68.0)	40.0 (104.0)
Mean daily maximum °C (°F)	7.8 (46.0)	9.8 (49.6)	12.9 (55.2)	15.4 (59.7)	19.8 (67.6)	23.5 (74.3)	28.0 (82.4)	27.8 (82.0)	24.0 (75.2)	17.8 (64.0)	12.1 (53.8)	8.9 (48.0)	17.4 (63.3)
Daily mean °C (°F)	4.2 (39.6)	5.5 (41.9)	8.1 (46.6)	10.2 (50.4)	14.3 (57.7)	17.6 (63.7)	21.1 (70.0)	20.7 (69.3)	17.8 (64.0)	13.4 (56.1)	8.5 (47.3)	5.6 (42.1)	12.3 (54.1)
Mean daily minimum °C (°F)	0.6 (33.1)	1.2 (34.2)	3.2 (37.8)	5.1 (41.2)	8.9 (48.0)	11.8 (53.2)	14.2 (57.6)	13.6 (56.5)	11.6 (52.9)	9.0 (48.2)	5.0 (41.0)	2.3 (36.1)	7.2 (45.0)
Record low °C (°F)	−20.5 (−4.9)	−20.2 (−4.4)	−12.0 (10.4)	−5.0 (23.0)	−2.4 (27.7)	3.0 (37.4)	5.1 (41.2)	3.6 (38.5)	0.0 (32.0)	−3.0 (26.6)	−11.5 (11.3)	−14.8 (5.4)	−20.5 (−4.9)
Average precipitation mm (inches)	75.2 (2.96)	67.7 (2.67)	58.2 (2.29)	84.6 (3.33)	76.9 (3.03)	69.2 (2.72)	36.7 (1.44)	55.5 (2.19)	70.2 (2.76)	87.9 (3.46)	83.4 (3.28)	81.2 (3.20)	846.7 (33.33)
Average precipitation days (≥ 1.0 mm)	11.0	9.5	9.4	11.0	9.2	7.5	5.2	6.3	7.0	10.2	10.7	10.6	107.6
Source: Meteociel

== Administration ==
Millau is a sub-prefecture of the Aveyron department in Occitania.

The 'Community of Communes of Millau Grands Causses' was created on 22 June 1989. It was a federation of 5 municipalities, namely Aguessac, Compeyre, Creissels, Millau and Paulhe. Nowadays, the community consists of 15 communes with the addition of Comprégnac, Saint-Georges-de-Luzençon, La Roque-Sainte-Marguerite, Saint-André-de-Vézines, Mostuéjouls, Peyreleau, Rivière-sur-Tarn and Veyreau.

== Tourism ==
The town is now a tourist destination with one of the largest campsites in the Massif Central, benefiting from the attractive surrounding landscapes and its architecturally acclaimed Viaduct. It is also a major centre for outdoor sports, especially paragliding. Millau hosts a variety of competitions every year.

=== Sporting events ===
- 100 kilometers of Millau (Running)
- Terre des Cardabelles Rally
- Templars Festival (Trail)
- Natural Games Festival (Outdoor Sports and Music)
- Viaduct Half-Marathon

=== Historical buildings ===
There are 11 listed historical monuments in Millau :

- The archaeological site of La Graufesenque, i.e. the remains of a major Gallo-Roman center for ceramics production.
- Notre-Dame de l'Espinasse, built in the twelfth century. This church takes its name from a relic of the crown of thorns once kept in his treasure. Destroyed in the sixteenth century, it was rebuilt a century later. Its bell tower is Toulouse style.
- The Belfry of Millau, which is composed of two parts corresponding to two different eras. The square tower was built in the twelfth century on the site of the original castle of the Counts of Millau. It assured the safety of the fortifications in the southwest corner. At the beginning of the 17th century, the consuls of Millau built an octagonal tower above it. The square tower was used as a prison from the 17th to the 19th century. The building was burned by lightning on 29 July 1811 and then rebuilt.
- The washhouse of the Ayrolle. The roof dates from the 18th century.
- The Old Mill and Old Bridge on the River Tarn.
- Sambucy de Sorgues Hôtel, also called Sambucy castle, and its gardens. It was built between 1672 and 1674 by Jacques Duchesne, Advisor to the King, local Master of Waters and Forests. After his marriage, the Hôtel became the property of Marc Antoine de Sambucy, capitoul of Toulouse.
- Sambucy de Miers Hôtel, acquired in the 17th century by the Sambucy family.
- Les Halles, a market hall built during the Belle Époque.
- La Rue Droite, the central Roman road.
- Pégayrolles Hôtel built in 1738, which now hosts the town's Museum. This Museum houses rich collections of pottery, tannery and gloves.
- The neo-Byzantine Sacré-Coeur church dating from the 19th century.
- Maison Marquès-Verdier, characteristic of the housing style of the provincial bourgeoisie during the second half of the 19th century

== Education ==
The schools of Millau fall under the authority of the academic administration in Toulouse. Vocational education can be found at the 2iSA (South Aveyron Computer Institute). Higher education courses are offered by the Institute of Nursing Training (IFSI), Jean Vigo High School (BTS), and the Conservatoire National des Arts et Métiers (CNAM).

== Transport ==
The Millau Viaduct

The Millau Viaduct, tallest cable-stayed road bridge in the world, which carries the A75 autoroute across the Tarn valley, relieved the town of much of its traffic, particularly during the summer months.

The municipality operates the airfield of Millau-Larzac.

== Economy ==
The town is the seat of the Chamber of Commerce and Industry in South Aveyron.

Having been recognized for over a century as the "capital of leather and glove", Millau is renowned for its tannery and sheepskin gloves. Although industrial fabric has all but disappeared, a few workshops continue to manufacture gloves for major French fashion and luxury brands. Millau gained the title of "City and Art Professions" in 2000.

Farming production, including Roquefort cheese made from raw sheep's milk, is essential to the economic activity of the region. Since 1993, a serie of four major night markets organized by farmer-producers take place from July to August in the city center. In November, the autumn fair of farm products is organized by the same association of farmers and runs for two days.

== Population ==
Historical population

Year	Pop.	±% p.a.
1793	6,070	—
1800	6,077	+0.02%
1806	6,523	+1.19%
1821	8,070	+1.43%
1831	9,806	+1.97%
1836	10,450	+1.28%
1841	9,014	−2.91%
1846	9,556	+1.17%
1851	10,041	+1.00%
1856	10,150	+0.22%
1861	12,636	+4.48%
1866	13,663	+1.58%
1872	15,095	+1.68%
1876	15,695	+0.98%
1881	16,628	+1.16%
1886	16,139	−0.60%
1891	17,429	+1.55%
1896	18,754	+1.48%
1901	18,701	−0.06%

Year	Pop.	±% p.a.
1906	18,482	−0.24%
1911	17,673	−0.89%
1921	15,528	−1.29%
1926	15,936	+0.52%
1931	16,190	+0.32%
1936	16,437	+0.30%
1946	17,678	+0.73%
1954	19,209	+1.04%
1962	21,229	+1.26%
1968	22,595	+1.04%
1975	21,907	−0.44%
1982	21,695	−0.14%
1990	21,788	+0.05%
1999	21,339	−0.23%
2007	22,041	+0.41%
2012	22,013	−0.03%
2017	22,109	+0.09%
2023	22,044	−0.05%

Source: EHESS and INSEE

== International relations ==
Millau is twinned with:

- Louga, Senegal (1962) (Note: The act of twinning was signed in Millau on 9 June 1962, by Charles Dutheil, deputy mayor of Millau, and Andrew Guillabert, Mayor of Luga. In 1989, the two cities decided to redefine their relations and emphasize cooperation activities in the fields of medicine, education and economic development.)
- Bad Salzuflen, Germany (1975)
- (United Kingdom) Bridlington, UK (1992)
- Sagunto, Spain (2006)
- Mostar, Bosnia and Herzegovina (2006)
- Mealhada, Portugal (2010)

== Notable people ==
- Justin Benoît (1813 – 1893), physician and anatomist.
- Emma Calvé (1858 – 1942), operatic dramatic soprano.
- José Bové (born 1953), farmer, politician and syndicalist, member of the alter-globalization movement.

== In fiction ==
Part of Ian McEwan's award-winning novel Atonement (2001) centers on Briony Tallis, a nurse in a London hospital in June 1940, to which wounded British and French soldiers evacuated from Dunkirk were brought. In a poignant passage, she is comforting Luc Cornet, a young soldier from Millau who is dying of severe head wounds. In his delirium he talks of the town, of his family and his father's boulangerie where he worked, and mistakes Tallis for his own fiancée.

After he dies, Tallis for a moment imagines the life she might have had if Luc had survived and if she had married him and come to live with him in Millau:

She imagined the unavailable future – the boulangerie in a narrow shady street swarming with skinny cats, piano music from an upstairs window, her giggling sisters-in-law teasing her about her accent, and Luc Cornet loving her in his eager way. She wanted to cry for him, and for his family in Millau who would be waiting to hear news from him. But she couldn't feel a thing. She was empty."

The Millau countryside also played an important part in the French film Total Western, by Eric Rochant.

== Gallery ==
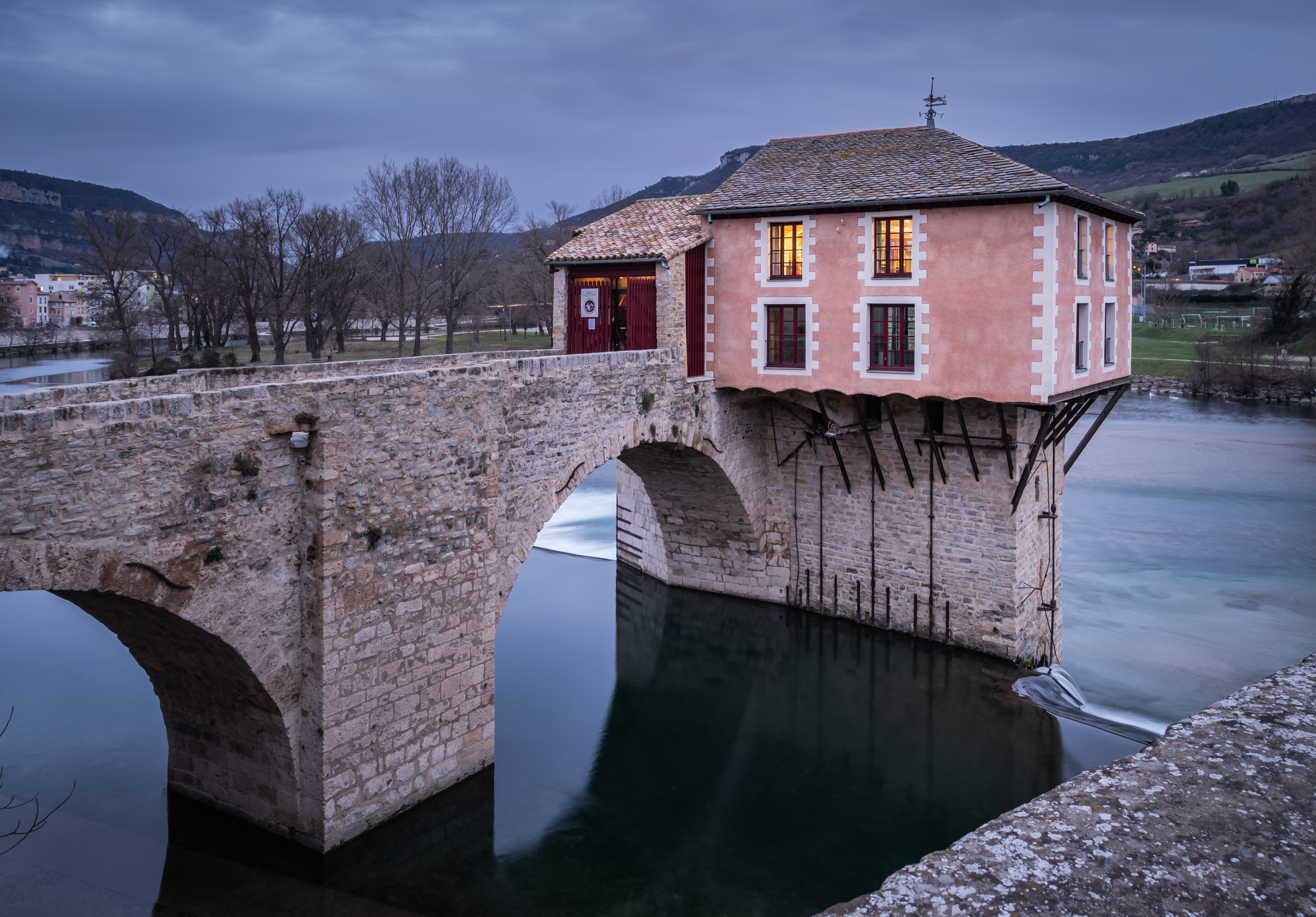
The old bridge

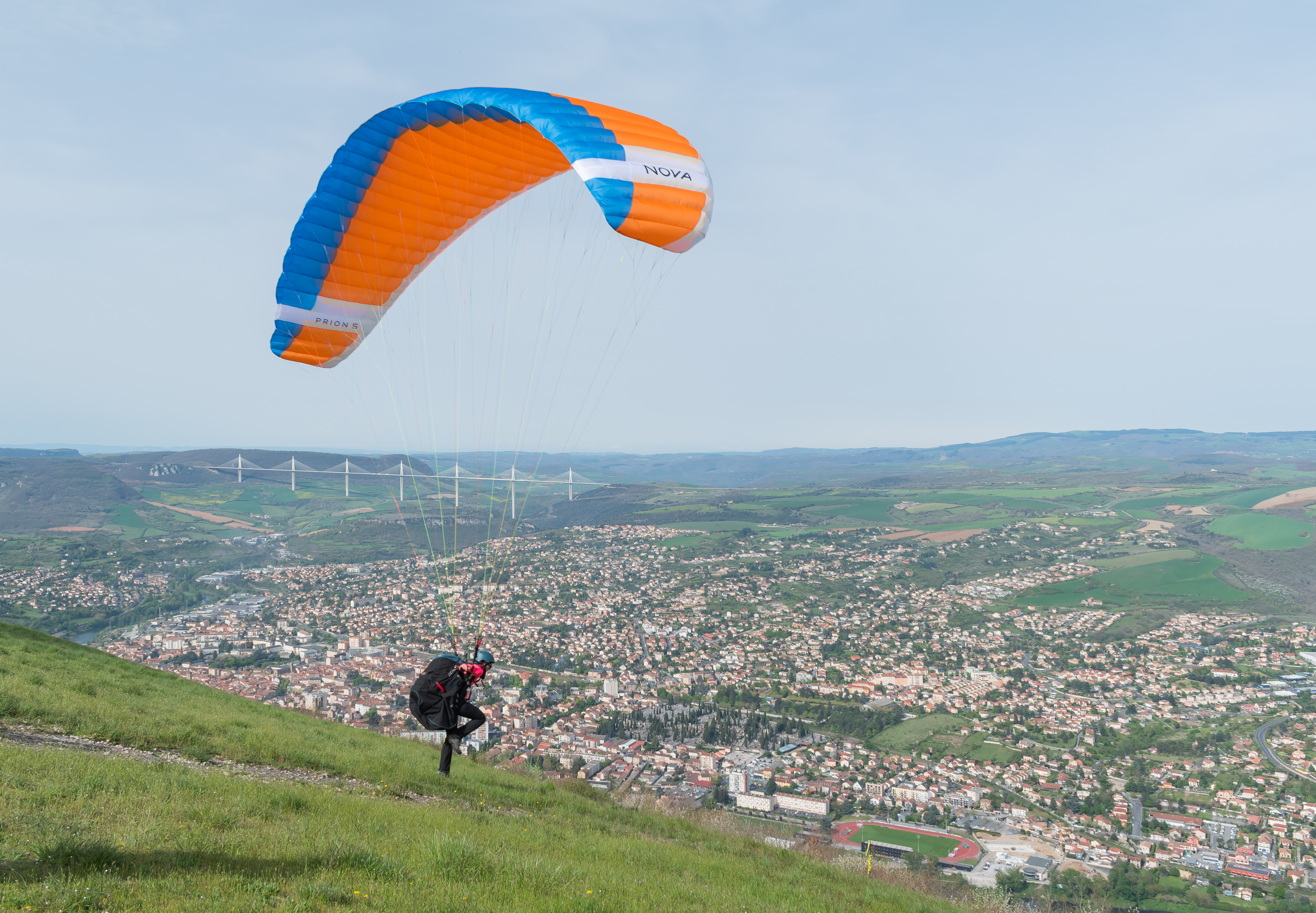
Paragliding in Millau

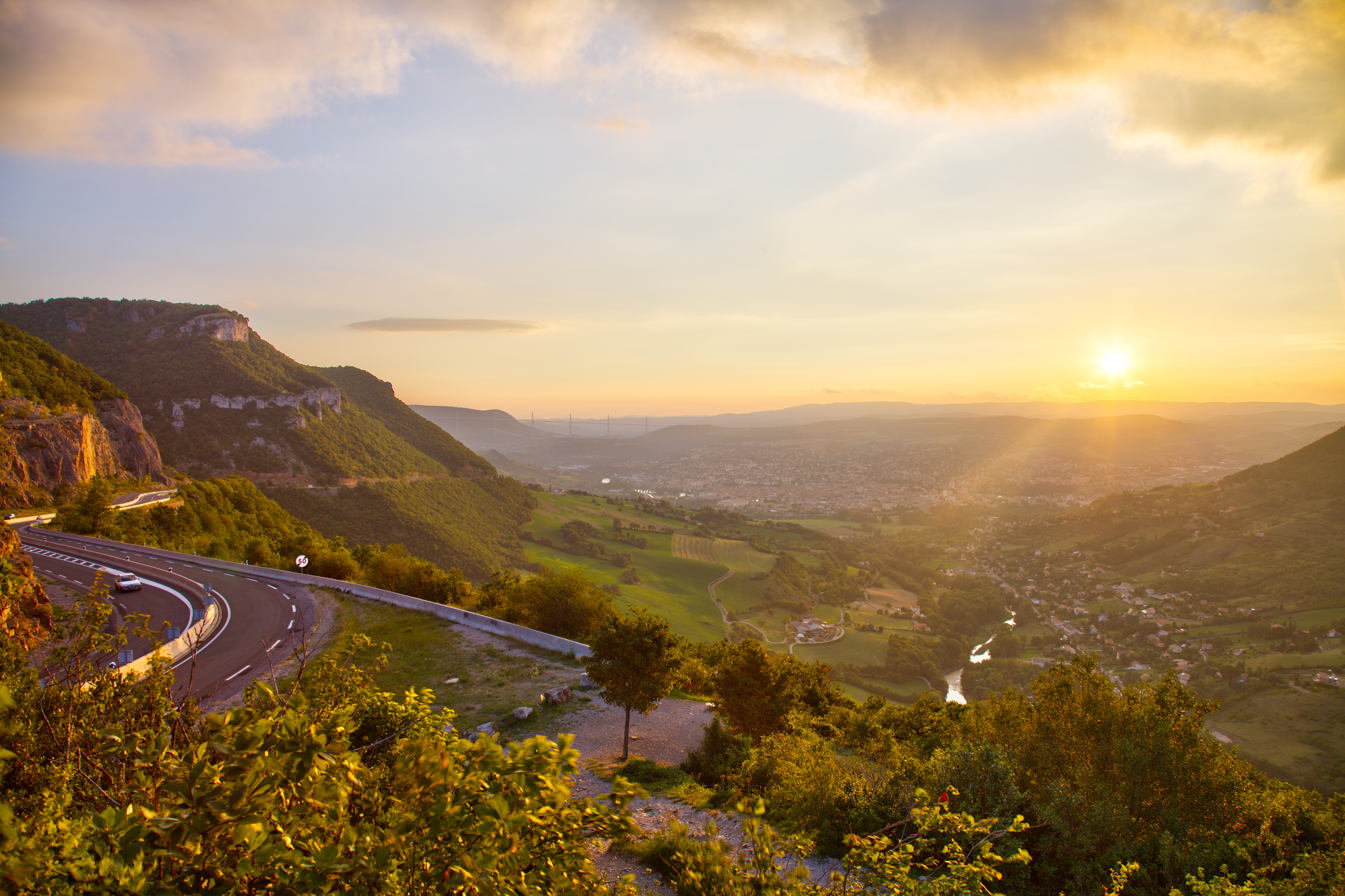
Sunset on the town

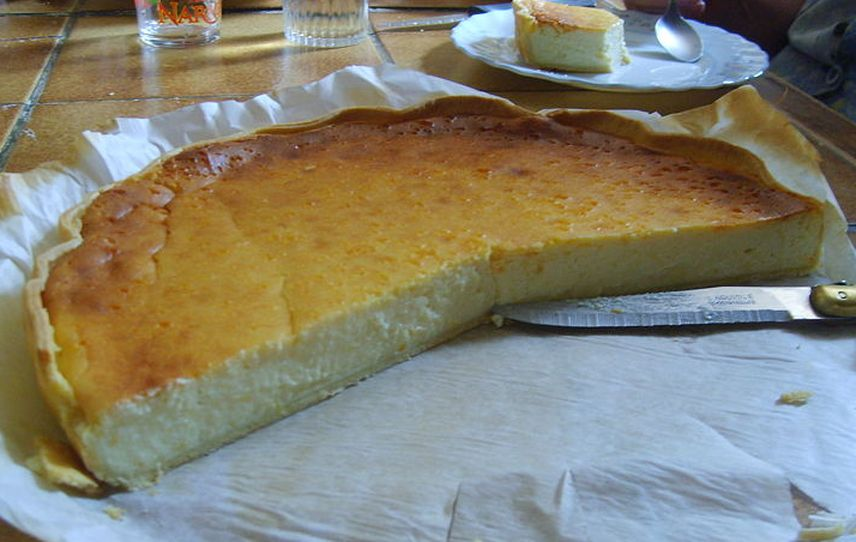
A piece of Flaune, the local cheesecake

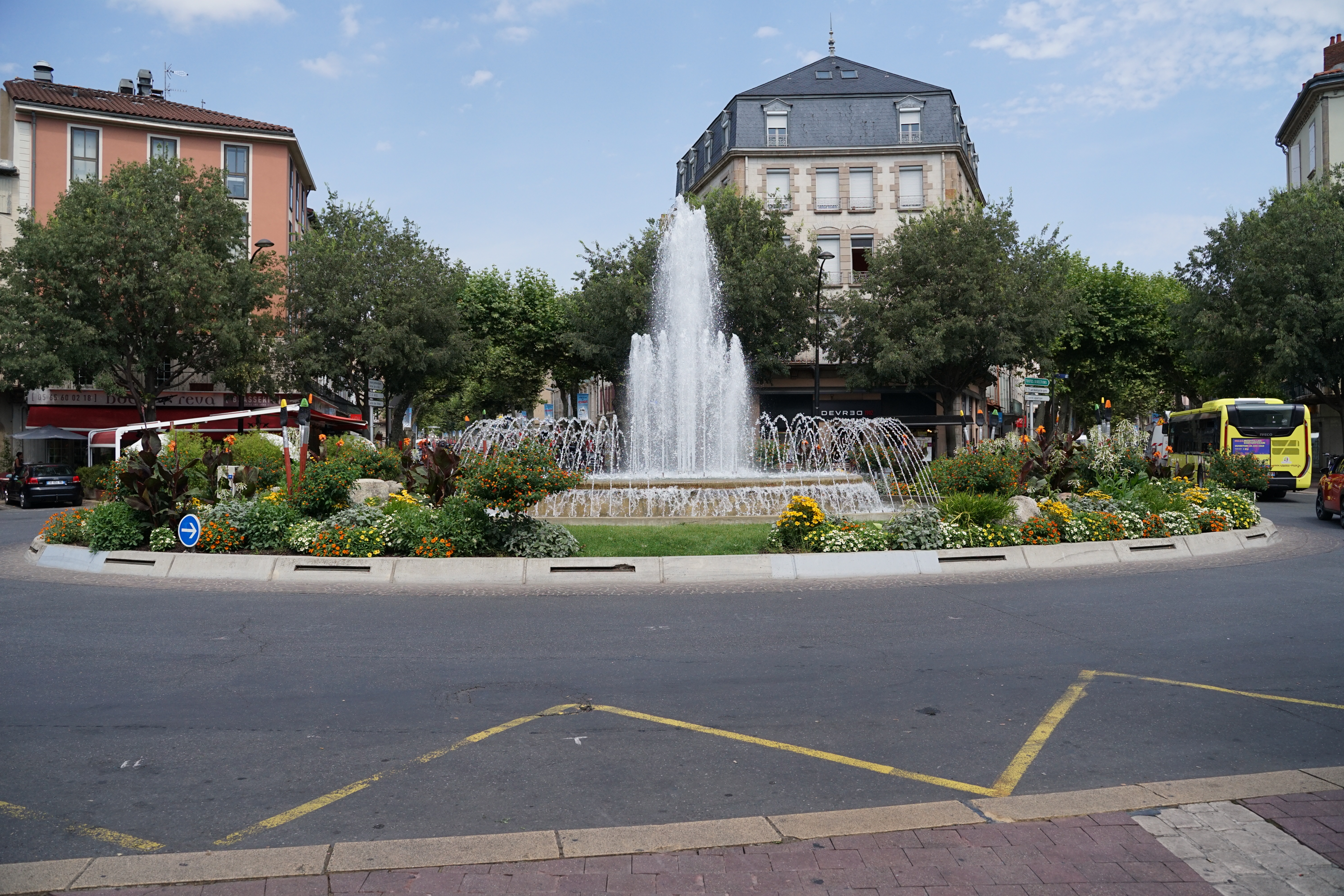
Fountain on Mandarous square

== See also ==
- Communes of the Aveyron department
- List of medieval bridges in France
- Béziers to Neussargues Railway
