= Pont de Normandie =

Cable-stayed bridge in Normandy, France

Normandy Bridge Pont de Normandie
- The bridge seen from the south
- Coordinates: 49°25′56″N 0°16′26″E
- Carries: A29 autoroute 4 lanes, (2 lanes each way)
- Crosses: Seine
- Locale: Le Havre, Seine-Maritime– Honfleur, Calvados, France
- Owner: Chambre de commerce et d'industrie du Havre
- Maintained by: Société des Autoroutes de Paris Normandie
- Preceded by: Tancarville Bridge

Characteristics
- Design: Cable-stayed bridge
- Material: Steel, concrete
- Total length: 2,141.25 m (7,025.1 ft)
- Width: 23.6 m (77 ft)
- Height: 202.74 m (665.2 ft)
- Longest span: 856 m (2,808 ft)
- No. of spans: 96–856–96 m (315–2,808–315 ft)
- Clearance below: 52 m (171 ft)

History
- Designer: SETRA, M. Virlogeux, F. Doyelle, C. Lavigne
- Constructed by: Bouygues; Campenon Bernard; Dumez; Monberg & Thorsen; Quillery; Sogea; Spie Batignolles
- Construction start: 1993
- Construction cost: €221 million (1987)
- Opened: 20 January 1995

Statistics
- Toll: Class 1:€5.90; Class 2:€6.90; Class 3:€7.40; Class 4:€14.80

Location
- Interactive map of Normandy Bridge

The Pont de Normandie (English: Normandy Bridge) is a cable-stayed road bridge that spans the river Seine linking Le Havre to Honfleur in Normandy, northern France. Its total length is 2,143.21 metres (7,032 ft) – 856 metres (2,808 ft) between the two piers. It is also the last bridge to cross the Seine before it empties into the ocean. It is a motorway toll bridge with a footpath and a narrow cycle lane in each direction allowing pedestrians and cyclists to cross the bridge free of charge, while motorcycling is also toll-free.

== Construction ==
The bridge was designed by Michel Virlogeux, the general studies having been led by Bernard Raspaud from Bouygues. The works management was shared between G. Barlet and P. Jacquet. The architects were François Doyelle and Charles Lavigne. Construction by Bouygues, Campenon Bernard, Dumez, Monberg & Thorsen, Quillery, Sogea and Spie Batignolles began in 1988 and lasted seven years. The bridge opened on 20 January 1995.

At the time it was both the longest cable-stayed bridge in the world, and also had a record distance between piers for a cable-stayed bridge. It was more than 250 metres (820 ft) longer between piers than the previous record-holder. This record was lost in 1999 to the Tatara Bridge in Japan. Its record for length for a cable-stayed bridge was lost in 2004 to the 2883 meters of the Rio-Antirrio. The total cost of the bridge, ancillary structures and financing was $465 million. The bridge proper cost €233 million (US$250 million).

The cable-stayed design was chosen because it was both cheaper and more resistant to high winds than a suspension bridge. Shortly after opening, the longest cables exhibited excessive vibrations, so several damping systems were quickly retrofitted.

== Structure ==
The span, 23.6 metres (77 ft) wide, is divided into four lanes for vehicular traffic and two lanes for pedestrians. The pylons, made of concrete, are shaped as upside-down Ys. They weigh more than 20,000 t (20,000 long tons; 22,000 short tons) and are 214.77 metres (705 ft) tall. More than 19,000 t (19,000 long tons; 21,000 short tons) of steel and 184 cables made by fr:Freyssinet were used.

== Gallery ==
Panoramic view of the Pont de Normandie
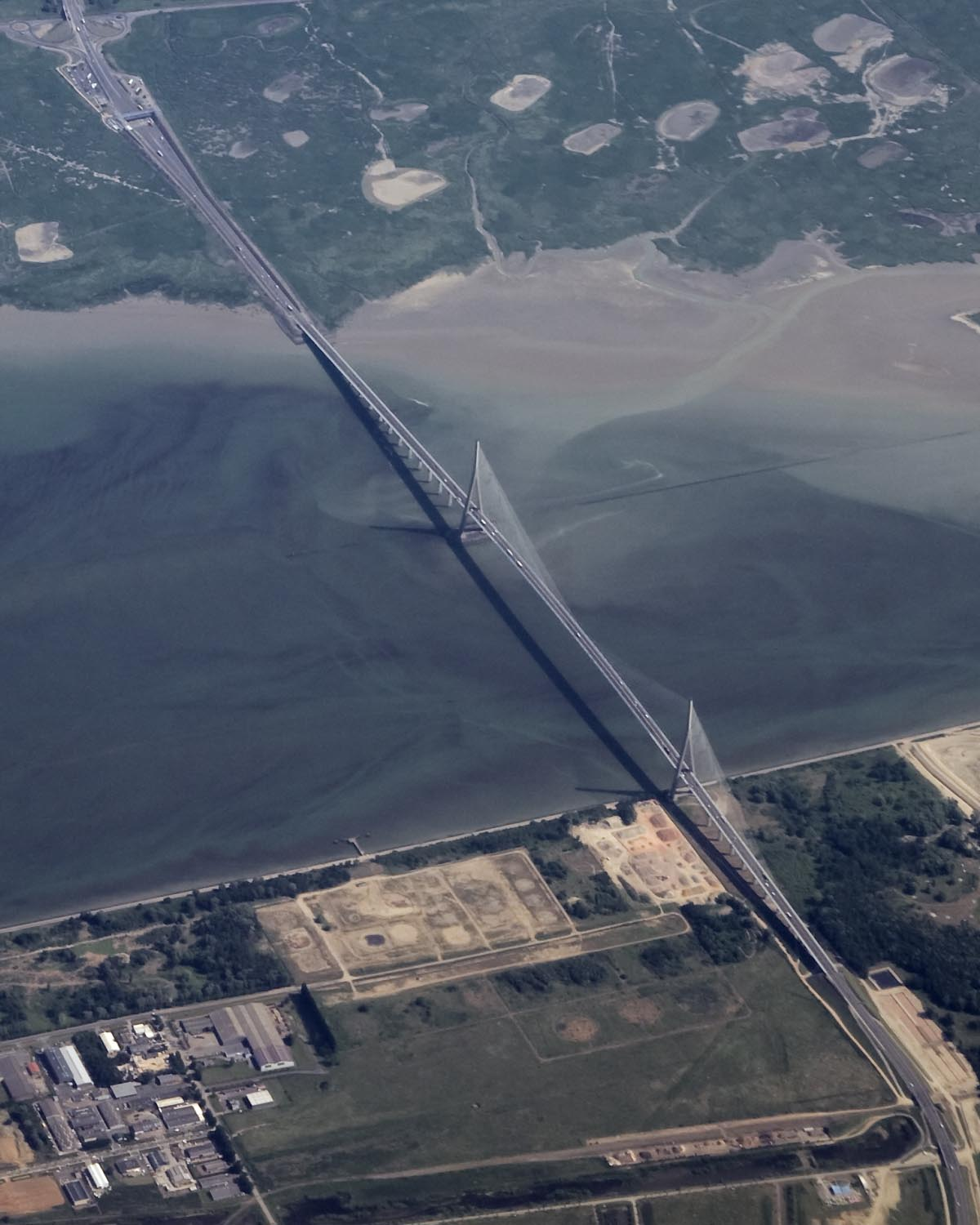
From above

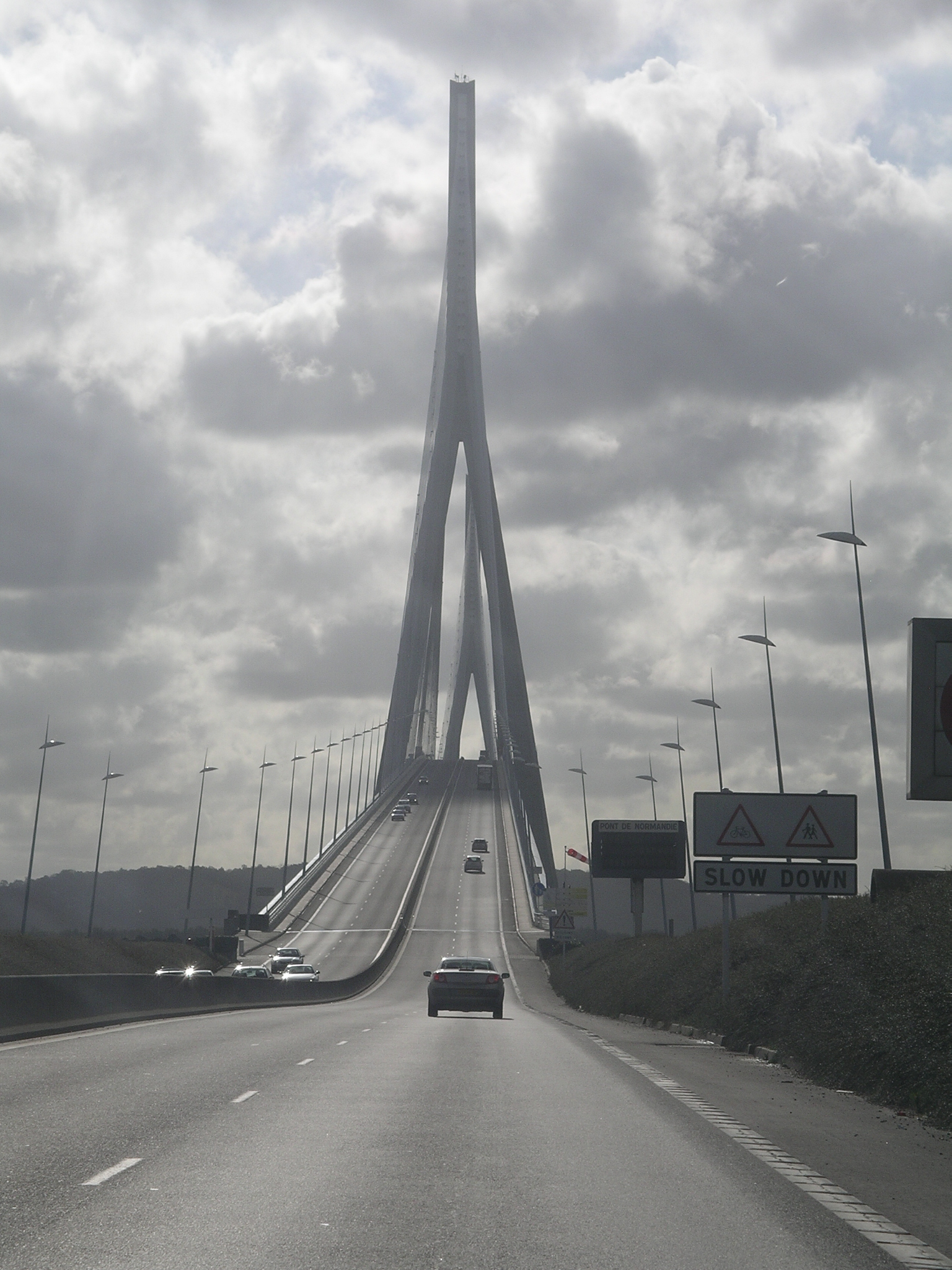
From the N1029 (A29 Autoroute)

Bridge in 2006

== See also ==
- List of bridges in France
- List of crossings of the River Seine
- List of longest cable-stayed bridge spans
- List of tallest bridges in the world
