= Jean-Baptiste Libouban =

French syndicalist (1935–2021)

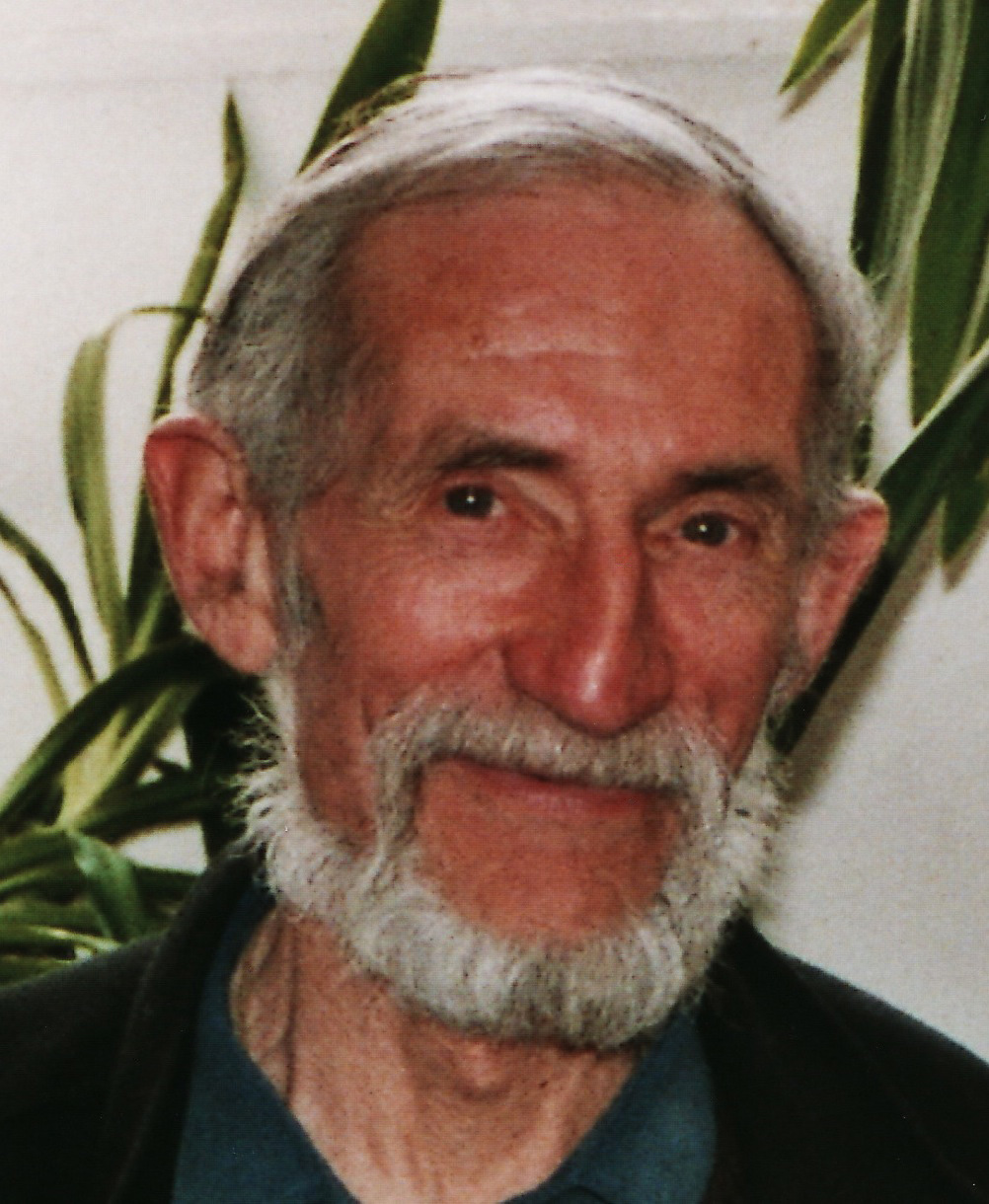
- Libouban in 2005
- Born: 24 February 1935; 17th arrondissement of Paris, France
- Died: 14 June 2021 (aged 86); Besançon, France
- Occupation: Syndicalist

Jean-Baptiste Libouban (24 February 1935 – 14 June 2021) was a French syndicalist. He was a member of the Community of the Ark, of which he was the highest-ranking member from 1990 to 2005 and started the movement for activism against genetic engineering.

== Biography ==
Libouban was born in Paris in 1935 to a Breton family from Plougrescant. He was the son of Jules Libouban and Suzanne Grelet. He studied in Strasbourg, where he met Lanza del Vasto and became involved with the Community of the Ark in Bollène.

As part of his mandatory conscription in the French Armed Forces, Libouban served as a nurse so that he would not have to carry a weapon. After refusing to join a team of paratroopers, he was imprisoned for six weeks. He then served 27 months in the Algerian War, first in a hospital and then in a school. After his service and marriage to an Algerian woman, he joined the Community of the Ark in 1963. In the Community, he served as a teacher and a carpenter. For many years, he lived in the Community of La Fleyssière in Joncels, living a simple life.

Libouban took part in several non-violent demonstrations, such as rallying against the construction of French atomic bombs, as well at the Fight for the Larzac. He also fought for the Kanak people in New Caledonia and actively opposed the Gulf War and the War in Iraq. He was an activist against genetic engineering, organizing and taking part in the Larzac 2003 rally.

Many of his protests were seen as illegal and was condemned by the Toulouse Court of Appeal on 8 November 2005 for destroying a plot of land with genetically-modified corn, which took place on 25 July 2004 in Menville. Following an unsuccessful appeal to the Court of Cassation, he was forced to pay 9000 euros in damages to three companies. On 11 March 2008, he was forced to pay a one euro fine for his refusal to submit to a DNA test, which earned him a criminal trial in Montpellier. However, he was released on 22 October 2008.

Jean-Baptiste Libouban died in Besançon on 14 June 2021 at the age of 86.

== Works ==
- Les Communautés de l'Arche : "Plutôt que de prêcher, mieux valait agir" (1990)
- Éthique ou manière d'agir (1996)
- Lanza del Vasto : Éveilleur et combattant (2001)
- Une initiative féconde : Jeûne à la porte de l'O.N.U. (2004)
- Préparation corporelle à la non-violence active (2006)
- Le Jeûne, action civique (2006)
