= Fight for the Larzac =

1971–1984 French farmer's movement

Logo of the Larzac movement

The Fight for the Larzac (Occitan: Luta del Larzac; French: Lutte du Larzac) refers to a non-violent civil disobedience action by farmers resisting the extension of a military base on the Larzac plateau in South Western France. The action lasted from 1971 to 1981 and ended in victory for the resistance movement when the new President François Mitterrand abandoned the project. The base, used for training French soldiers, was originally established in 1902 on 3,000 ha (7,400 acres; 12 sq mi) of uncultivated heathland. Michel Debré, Minister of Defence in the Georges Pompidou administration, announced that the base would be extended to 13,700 ha (34,000 acres; 53 sq mi) and that the land would be expropriated in the public interest. An initial informal resistance movement was formed by 103 landowners whose land was subject to expropriation. In 1973 their cause was taken up by a much larger group of heterogeneous activists, predominantly left wing, and numbering up to 100,000. This activist group descended on the Larzac in support of the peasant landowners and extended the protest to a more general action against what they saw as the militarism of the Pompidou government. This action, once it had achieved its focal aims on the Larzac, was the core of what then became the Anti-Globalism movement and also served to bring to public attention leaders such as Lanza del Vasto, José Bové, and the late Guy Tarlier.

== Origins of the conflict ==
=== Announcement of intention ===
On 11 October 1970, during a session of the Union des démocrates pour la république (UDR) (Union of democrats for the Republic), André Fanton, secretary of state for defence, gave the first hint that the base would need to be extended. Le Monde of 6 March 1971 quoted Deputy Delmas, then campaigning for election to UDR, as saying "The extension of the military base is doubtless the last chance for survival of the town of Millau." Millau (IPA: [mijo],) at the Northern edge of the Larzac plateau, is today world-famous for its spectacular viaduct over the river Tarn. In 1971 it was chiefly known to French families for its sheepskin glove industry in decline and its infuriating traffic jams. Popular resistance to the proposal for the military base was immediately evident. On 28 October 1971, Defence Minister Michel Debré made the formal announcement in a televised interview. The base was to be extended from 3,000 to 17,000 hectares (30 to 170 square kilometers). Land would be expropriated from 107 farms in 12 communes around on the small town of La Cavalerie. The extended base would form one sixth of the total area (100,000 hectares) of the Larzac itself. In subsequent commentary, Debré pointed out that the project would be "not only vital to the national defence" but would have "a positive impact" on the region. He cited improvement of the rural electrical distribution system, water supply and roads. He stated that the extension was necessitated by saturation of French military bases in general and the need to maintain a military force in proximity to the Plateau d'Albion, launch site of ground-ground ballistic nuclear missiles which formed an important element of the French nuclear deterrent.

It was argued by the authorities that the Larzac plateau was sparsely populated, having been substantially depopulated by the so-called "rural exodus", losing two thirds of its population between 1866 and 1968, although since 1968 population had begun to increase due to the "neo-rural" movement. Sheep herders and producers of Roquefort cheese, the most famous product of the region, denied that the project would be a net boost for employment because, as a training camp, it would attract only temporary inhabitants. They were also sceptical of the promised economic benefits.

André Fanton made his attitude clear in a public speech:

Whether we like it or not, the potential agricultural riches of the Larzac are extremely weak. So I think it was logical to consider that the extension would cause only minimum inconvenience... It is true that there are a few peasants ... who desultorily raise a few sheep, while living the life of the Middle Ages. It is necessary to take their land.

=== First demonstrations, oath of the 103 ===
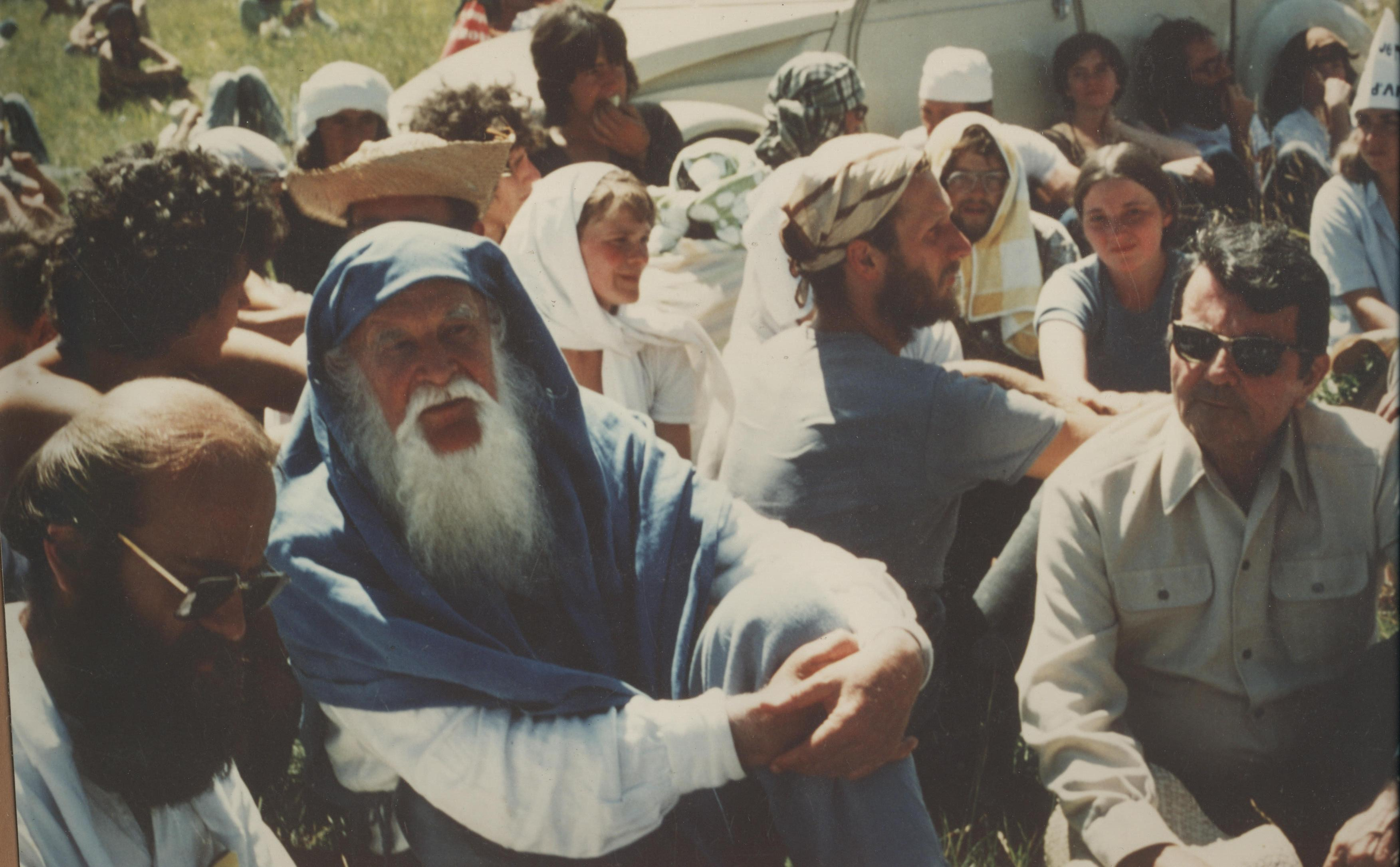
Left to right, Jean-Marie Muller, Lanza del Vasto, Jacques de Bollardière on the Larzac during the struggle against the military camp extension.

The first notable demonstration took place on 6 November 1971 at Millau. Some 6,000 people assembled in the Place du Mandarous. At this point the movement was still local but it attracted a fairly wide spectrum of participants. The core group were members of long-established and deeply rooted peasant families but there were also many younger farming families, new to the area and in considerable debt to the Crédit Agricole bank which had financed their acquisition and exploitation of land. Many of these relative newcomers belonged to the quasi-religious organisation Jeunesse Agricole Catholique (Young Catholic Farmers). Institutional religion was influential in reconciling the many divergent views at this point. Notably, on 7 November 1971 the bishop of Rodez (the Departmental seat of government) announced his opposition to the base extension.

There was sufficient unanimity, at any rate, for 103 of the 107 people potentially threatened with expropriation to sign a formal contract on 28 March 1972. The contract expressed solidarity and declared that not a single farmer would be dispossessed against his will. This was the "Oath of the 103".

A further demonstration took place the following 14 July, the national holiday, in Rodez. 20,000 people and 70 tractors participated. The slogan GARDAREM LO LARZAC began to appear all across the region. It means, loosely, THE LARZAC IS OURS, and significantly it's written in Occitan, the original language of Languedoc which is not used commercially but is cherished by a militant minority.

== Politicisation ==
=== Mass rallies ===
Suddenly, the defiant peasant resistance to militarism became a political cause célèbre. Left-wingers of all types took up the cause. Socialists, Communists, and Trade Union militants appeared in Millau and in the villages of the Larzac noisily adding their support to a movement that had originally been declared apolitical. To these were added Occitanian nationalists, protesting against what they saw as cultural genocide by a colonial power. Further complicating the situation, a rag-tag assortment of hippies and drop-outs attached themselves to the resistance movement, together with protesters whose motives seemed very remote from the interests of sheep husbandry – pro-choice feminists, for example. Writing in Le Monde (25 August 1973), Michel Castaing described the Larzac as "The shop window of protest".

This phase of the protest movement culminated in the first mass rally, on 25–26 August 1973, at Rajal del Guorp (the name means 'Crow Springs' in occitan,) a natural dolomitic amphitheatre north-west of La Cavalerie. The location is inside the perimeter of the military base and so holding the rally there was an act of defiance. Between 60,000 and 100,000 people (the latter figure claimed by the organisers assembled to show their support, in a remote site entirely devoid of facilities for refreshment and hygiene). The event attracted world attention—speakers at the rally included representatives of revolutionary movements in Chile, Italy and Greece. Two members of the Irish Republican Army expressed their solidarity with the peasants of the Larzac and declared support for resistance "by whatever means are necessary". Police surveillance at this rally was minimal, with a single Gendarmerie helicopter overhead.

A second mass rally at Rajal del Guorp took place a year later, 17–18 August 1974. This time the organisers claimed even more than 100,000 protesters. François Mitterrand made an appearance and was pelted with pebbles by militant Maoists. Since they happened in mid-summer, at the height of the tourist season, these and other gatherings inevitably had something of the atmosphere of festivals, regardless of the seriousness of their intent. Musical instruments and topless young women were much in evidence and commemorative T-shirts quickly appeared in local markets. A few concerts were organised, such as that by Graeme Allwright in 1973. Allwright later wrote a song entitled Larzac 1975. Even José Bové referred to those rallies with some pride as "the French Woodstock" but he also recognised that the effect on public relations was decidedly mixed.

=== Paris marches ===
More ingenious tactics were soon used. On 25 October 1974, a flock of 60 sheep were transported to Paris and set to grazing on the Champ de Mars, right under the Eiffel Tower. To inquiring gendarmes, the shepherds explained that it was publicity for Roquefort cheese. Earlier, a protest march on Paris had been triggered by the signature of the decree of expropriation in the public interest, on 26 December 1972. The march began on the following 7 January, with stops at Rodez, Saint-Flour, Clermont-Ferrand, Nevers and Orléans. At each stop, marchers were welcomed and lodged by local committees; meetings, rallies, and press conferences were organised.

Police and local authorities were much less welcoming. The marchers were harassed at every stop-over. Finally, at Orléans, the procession was blocked by the Compagnies Républicaines de Sécurité (CRS, French riot police) and their 26 tractors impounded. Bernard Lambert, leader of the Mouvement des Paysans Travailleurs (Working Peasant Movement), promptly arranged for the loan of 26 tractors belonging to farmers in the Orléans area, the CRS were outflanked and the march proceeded to Paris.

A second Paris march began on 2 December 1978. 18 Larzac farmers walked 710 km in 25 stages. The CRS blocked the centre of Paris but 40,000 supporters rallied on the outskirts, making the largest demonstration of the year. The final Paris action began on 27 November 1980, at the height of the presidential campaigns of François Mitterrand and Valéry Giscard d'Estaing. Mitterrand, notwithstanding his treatment at the hands of militants at Rajal del Guorp in 1974, had opposed the base extension. Giscard was in favour of it. The action consisted of an encampment, in bitterly cold weather, on the Champ de Mars complete with farm animals, bales of straw, a radio station and a media information bureau. The demonstrators were forcibly removed after a few days but the point had been made.

=== Civil disobedience ===
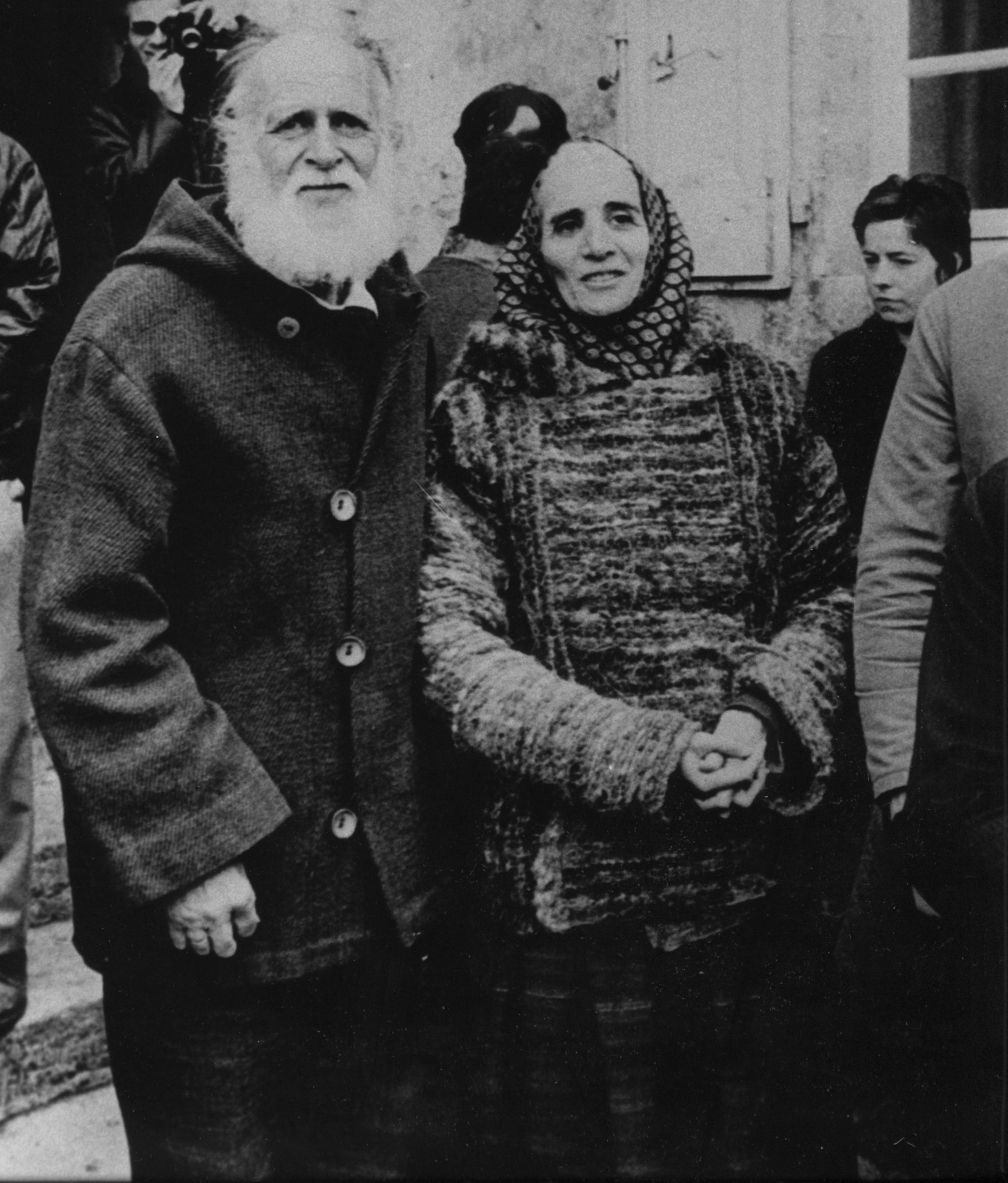
Lanza del Vasto and his wife Chanterelle during his hunger strike.

As early as 1972, the communard, philosopher and theorist of non-violence Lanza del Vasto had taken an interest in the plight of the Larzac shepherds and farmers. Del Vasto's commune, the Community of the Ark, was nearby on the plateau de l'Escandorgue. He and his followers were skilled at civil disobedience, veterans of hunger strikes against the use of torture during the Algerian war and against nuclear weapons. On 19 March Lanza del Vasto began a 15-day hunger strike at La Cavalerie. He was joined by four local residents: Etienne Paloc, Pierre Bastide, and Pierre & Christiane Burguière. Mme Burguière recalled the impact it had on them. In 2011 she told film-maker Christian Rouaud "it was amazing, in a moral sense. When we came back, I felt I was no longer the same. Yes. Something had happened."

Civil disobedience was also partly the motive of the decision to rebuild the ruined stone sheep shelter (bergerie) at La Blaquière. The property belonged to activist Auguste Guiraud and was due for expropriation under the terms of the decree. On 10 June 1973 re-construction began in defiance of the expropriation order and the fact that planning permission had not been granted. Hundreds of supporters came to join the effort, notably the hippie contingent who had to learn the art and craft of masonry very quickly, with somewhat random results. Pierre Bonnefous recalled

There was a mason in charge, and he was told 'Try and explain what needs to be done, and these guys can haul stone, make cement.' But the mason said 'When I see these guys incapable of holding a wheelbarrow upright with cement or stone in it, forget it, we're not going to make it.' So it was Utopian from the start.

To say that the influx of hippies shocked the locals is an understatement. Marizette Tarlier recalled that it was the first time she'd seen bare-breasted women in public. The eight months of construction were marked by constant argument and conflict, but the bergerie was finished in February 1974 and stands to this day as a monument to the joint effort.

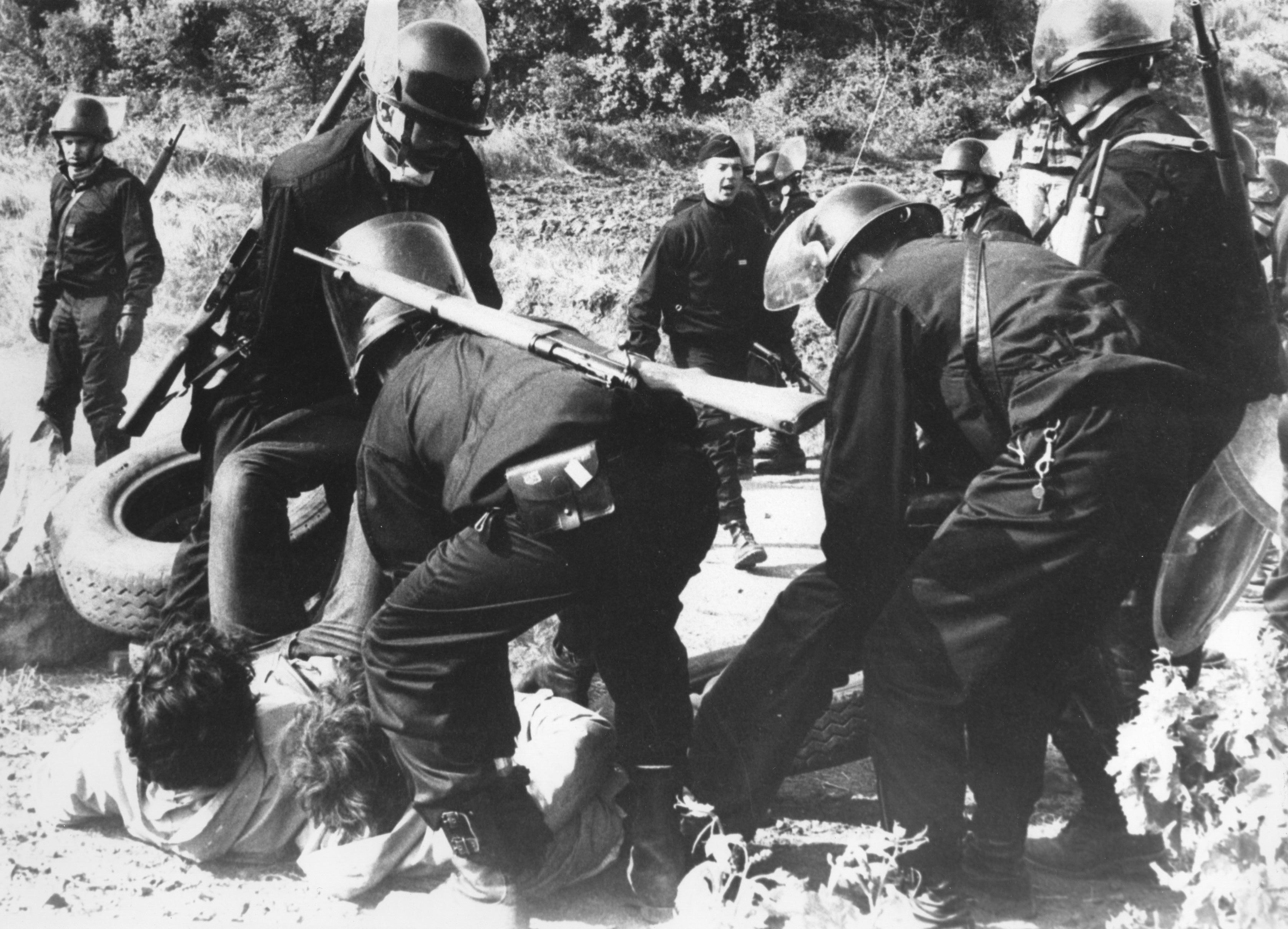
Gendarmes mobiles removing activists

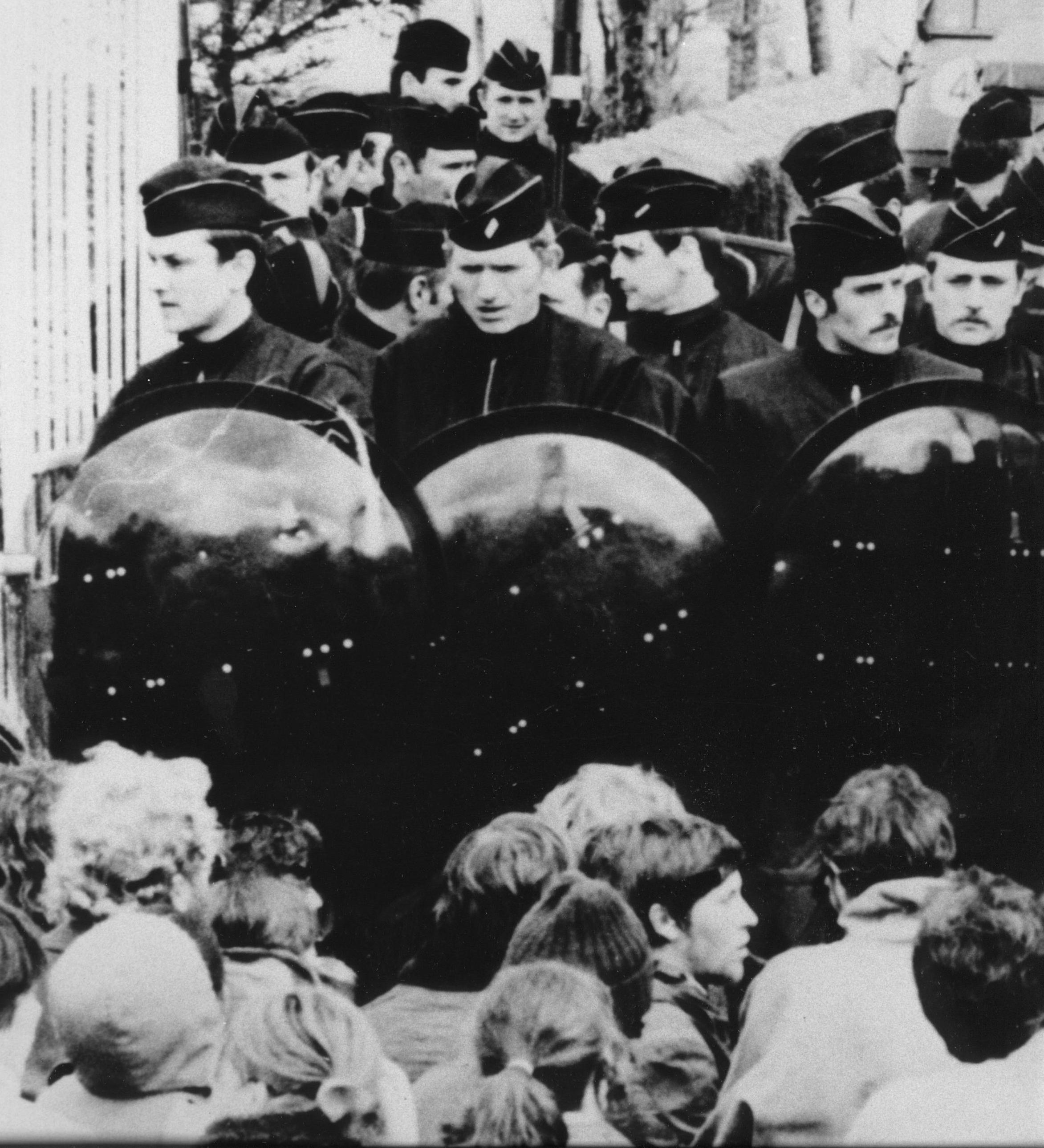
French riot police (CRS)

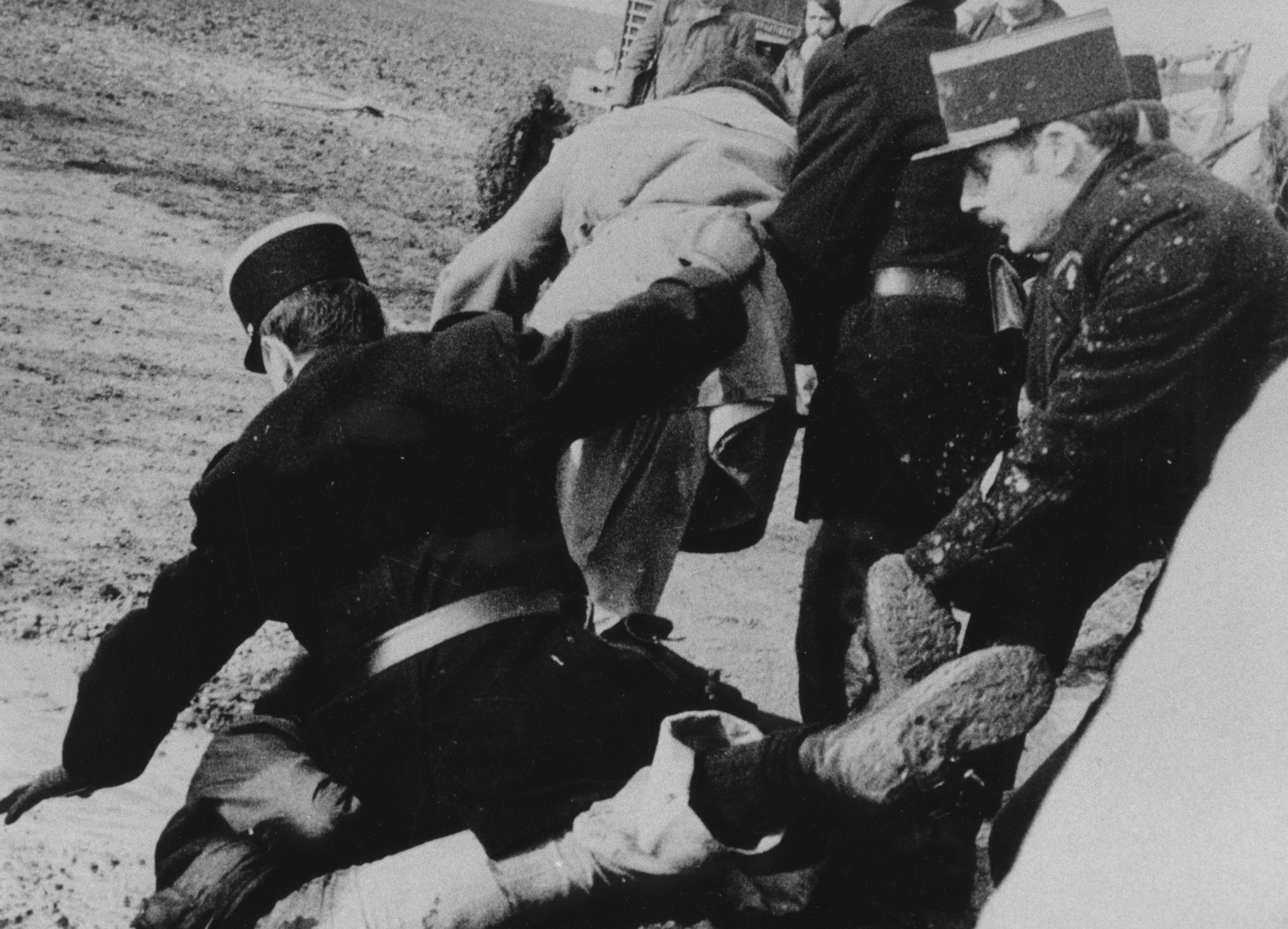
Gendarmes removing activists

Another tactic that was used with success was to sell very small parcels of land to many sympathisers, with the aim of making the eventual expropriation as difficult as possible for the bureaucracy. Between 1973 and 1981, 6,180 tiny plots were allocated to 3,500 different people and to make the act of expropriation even more difficult, many of these "landowners" lived abroad.

In 1976, the fight escalated after soldiers blew up Auguste Guiraud's house in La Blaquière during the night. Miraculously, Guiraud and his seven children were unharmed. On 22 June, a group of 22 activists entered the Larzac military base and destroyed 500 documents containing details of the expropriation. They were arrested and arraigned in Millau the next day. They were sentenced to prison terms varying from three to six months but in fact none actually served more than three weeks. On 21 October 1977, trials of Larzac activists took place in Millau. A smörgåsbord of charges included disobedience of authority, removal of army property, blocking traffic, etc. The hearings were much disrupted by the deliberate release of a flock of sheep in the courtroom.

== Organisation of the collective ==
To run the campaign, an executive committee was formed and put in charge. Once general assemblies became more frequent, regional committees (Larzac-East, West, North, South and La Cavalerie) were formed. A rule, never broken over the ten years of the campaign, was that only residents of the Larzac had voting power in the general assemblies. Decisions were normally made by consensus, with the exception of decisions pertaining to negotiations with the government in 1977; these were by democratic vote. Meetings were held at least weekly for the ten years of the campaign. The organisers were in frequent contact with other civil disobedience actions elsewhere in France, as well as the anti-nuclear movement. Another bergerie was built at the site of the proposed nuclear power station at Plogoff, and the Larzac contributed 20 ewes to the action.

About 150 committees were formed to encourage and support various political actions, not just in France but in other European countries. 28 October 1978 saw a national day of action organised by the Larzac committees. Marches, meetings, and hunger strikes were attended by tens of thousands of sympathisers. Jean-Paul Sartre sent a letter of support, including these words

Greetings, peasants of the Larzac. I salute your fight for justice, liberty and peace, surely the most beautiful fight of this 20th century.

— Jean-Paul Sartre
(Je vous salue paysans du Larzac et je salue votre lutte pour la justice, la liberté et pour la paix, la plus belle lutte de notre vingtième siècle.)

In 1975 the movement started its own newspaper, Gardarem lo Larzac. The first edition was published on 6 June and the journal eventually had 4,000 subscribers. In February 1979, local referendums were organised in the surrounding communities of Millau, Creissels, and La Couvertoirade (a medieval city of the Knights Templar.) 88 to 95% of the electorate voted NO to the extension of the military base.

== Victory ==
In May 1980, the Cour de Cassation, France's appeal court of last resort, annulled the 66 expropriation proceedings. Once François Mitterrand was elected President on 10 May 1981, he declared the base extension project formally abandoned in the Council of Ministers. Property already acquired by the State for the project was leased back to the private company Terres du Larzac (Larzac Soils). Victory was complete but Lanza del Vasto did not live to see it. He had died on 5 January, at the age of 79.

== Videography ==
Philippe Cassard, Producer (2003). La Lutte du Larzac (Fight for the Larzac).

Christian Rouaud, Producer/Director (23 November 2011). Tous au Larzac (Everyone to the Larzac). Elzévir Films.

This two-hour documentary features historical film footage and extended interviews with some of those most intimately involved in the fight for the Larzac. With remarkable candour and good humour, they look back on the 1971–81 decade nearly 40 years later. Featuring Pierre Bonnefous, José Bové, Pierre & Christiane Burguière, Michel Courtin, Léon Maille, Christian Roqueirol, Vve Marizette Tarlier, Michèle Vincent.

Awards
Preceded by Oceans	César Award for Best Documentary; 2012	Succeeded by
