= Jacques Pâris de Bollardière =

French Army general, non-violence advocate

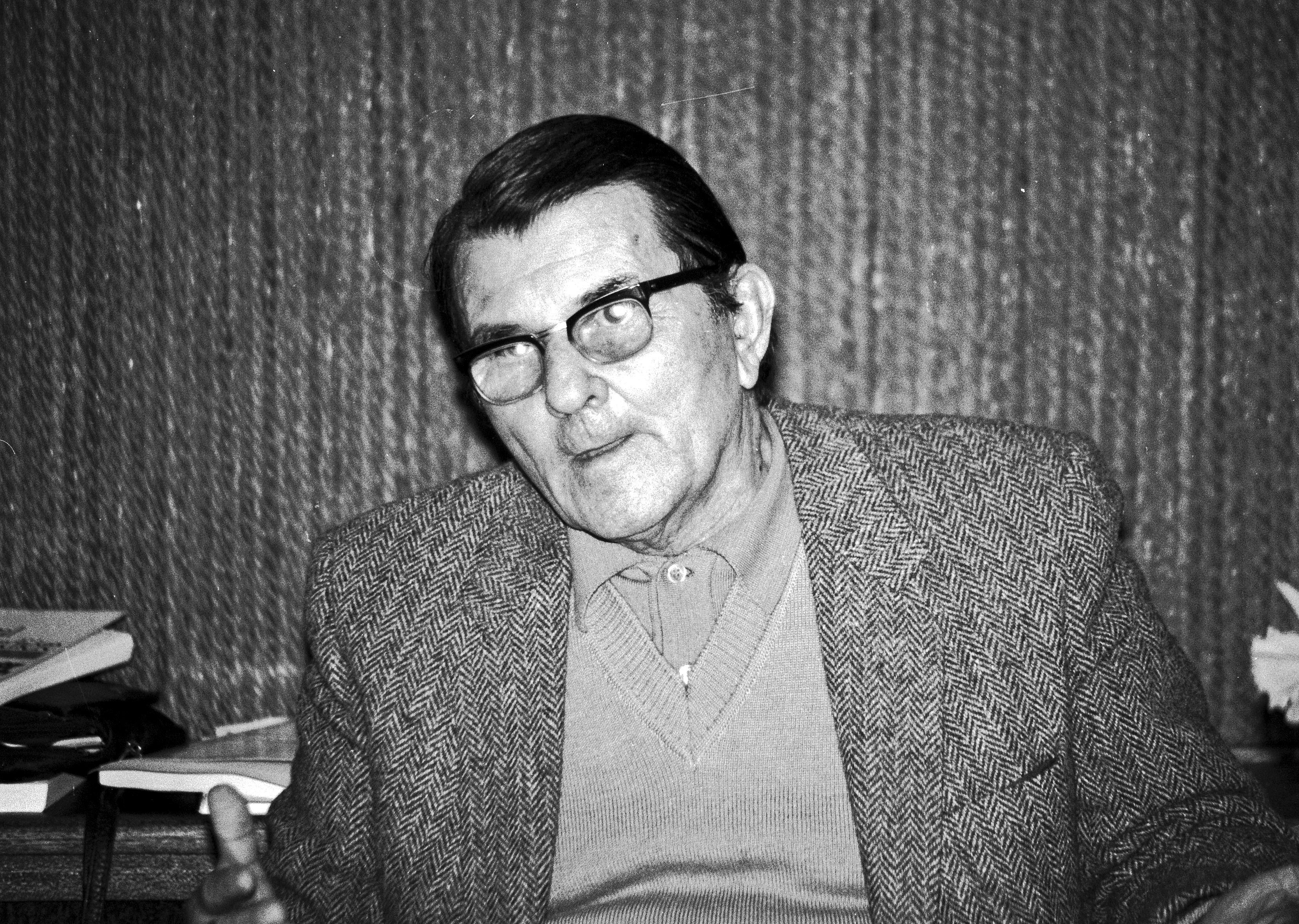
- Born: 16 December 1907; Châteaubriant, Loire-Atlantique, France
- Died: 22 February 1986 (aged 78); Talhouet, France
- Military career
- Allegiance: France
- Branch: French Army
- Service years: 1930–1961
- Rank: Général de Brigade
- Conflicts: World War II; First Indochina War; Algerian War
- Awards: Grand Officer of the Légion d'honneur Companion of the Liberation; Distinguished Service Order

Jacques Pâris de Bollardière (16 December 1907 – 22 February 1986) was a French Army general, known for his advocacy of non-violence during the 1960s.

== Biography ==
=== Early life ===
Bollardière was born in 1907 in Brittany, into a family with a tradition of military service, particularly in the French colonial empire: he was part of the fourth generation of his family to enlist, alongside his brother, who was killed in the Rif War after their father had moved the family to Morocco in 1916. In 1927, Jacques enrolled at the Military Academy of Saint-Cyr; he graduated in 1930 and due to insubordination, it was only with the rank of sergeant. (Saint-Cyr cadets normally graduate as commissioned officers, with the rank of sous-lieutenant). He disliked the authoritarianism he encountered at Saint-Cyr: he later considered this attitude to be key to his decision to join the French Resistance whilst many of his former classmates served Vichy France. He was quickly promoted to sous-lieutenant and to lieutenant in 1932.

He joined the French Foreign Legion in February 1935 and was posted to Algeria until 1940.

=== Second World War ===
In February 1940, Bollardière was assigned to the 13th Foreign Legion Demi-Brigade, and promoted to captain. He took part in the Battles of Narvik, and was back in Brest on the 13th of June. Seeing the debacle of the French armies, he crossed the Channel on a fishing boat and was among the first to join Charles de Gaulle (the momentous rallying call that founded the Fighting French was broadcast on the 18th of that month); the Vichy regime sentenced him to death.

Bollardière fought in Gabon, and in Eritrea during the East African Campaign. Leading a 90-man strong party, he managed to seize and occupy an Italian fort in Massawa, taking over 300 prisoners. He was made a Compagnon de la Libération for this action.

Promoted to commandant (Major) in 1941, he took part in the capture of Damascus that summer. The following year, he took part in the Battle of Bir Hakeim, and the First Battle of El Alamein. He was severely wounded by a mine.

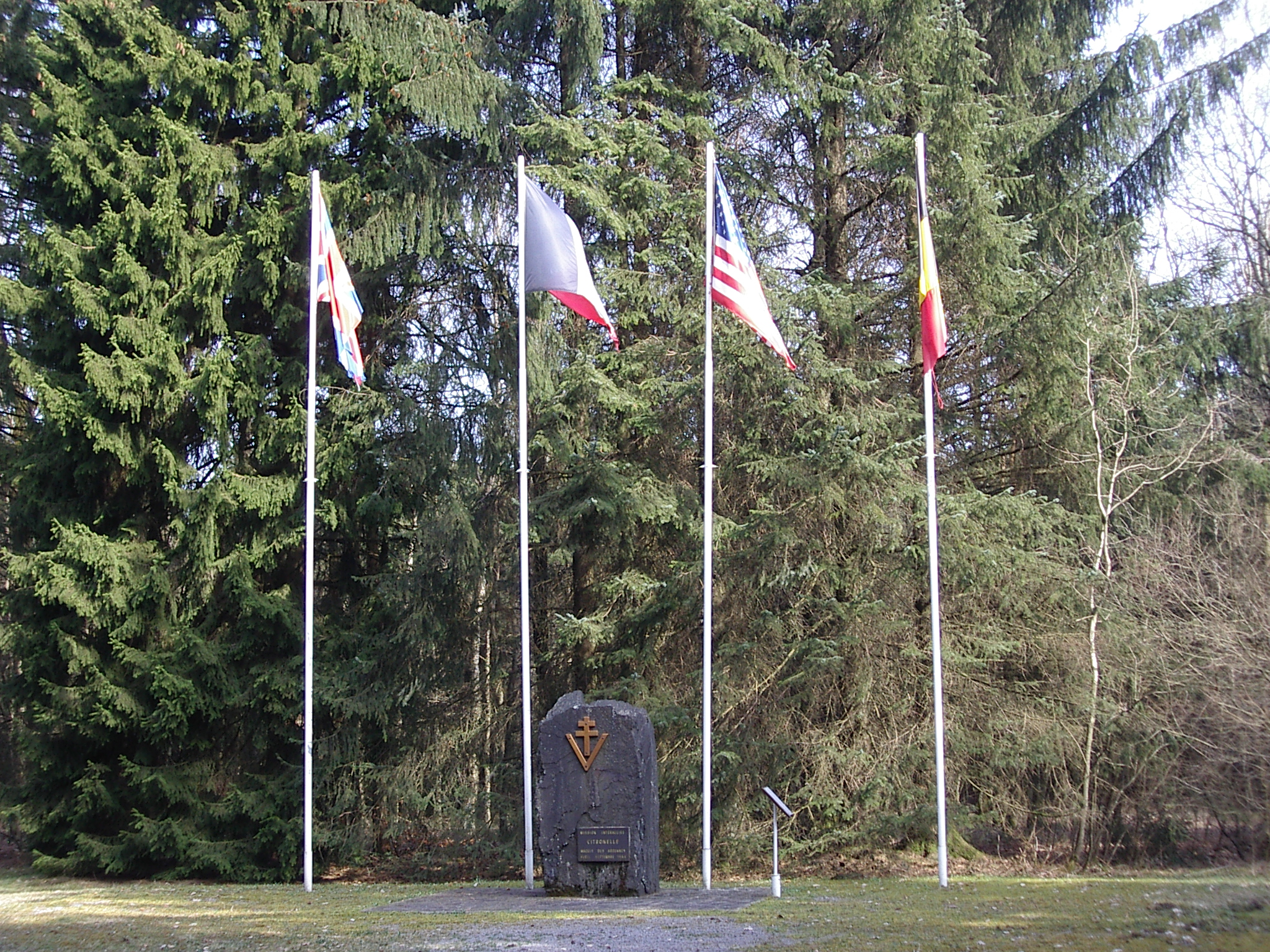
Maquis des Manises memorial

In October 1943, he volunteered for Special Forces training and was put on a parachute-training course. On 12 April 1944, Bollardière was parachuted in France to take a command of the maquis in Ardennes (Maquis des Manises), under the nom de guerre "Prisme". His maquis units engaged German troops and sustained heavy casualties, but made a successful link with the advancing Allied ground forces. In September 1944, Bollardière returned to England.

He was then posted to the Airborne Forces and joined the "Red Berets" of the 3e Régiment de Chasseurs Parachutistes (Parachute Light Infantry), which was part of the Special Air Service Brigade. He parachuted into Holland, subsequently making his way to Germany following their defeat in 1945.

=== Indochina war ===
Bollardière was in command of a paratrooper demi-brigade at the outbreak of the First Indochina War. He took part in commando actions in Laos, Cambodia and Tonkin. He subsequently said that having initially understood the Indochina War as an action to restore legitimate French rule in the area after the Japanese occupation, he came to draw parallels between the anti-colonialist forces he was fighting against and the maquis group he led during the Second World War.

=== Algerian War ===
From October 1953, Bollardière taught paratrooper strategy and tactics at the Paris École de Guerre, the prestigious school for staff officers.

At the outbreak of the Algerian War, in July 1956, Bollardière was put in command of two brigades in the Algerian Atlas Mountains. He was promoted to général de brigade in December, becoming the youngest general of the French army of the time. His philosophy of "pacification" was significantly different from that of the violent counterinsurgency strategy used by the bulk of French forces, instead attempting to build relationships between the Pied-Noirs and the Arab-Berber population, eschewing racial profiling of indigenous people, and initiating work projects to benefit the local community. This distinct approach was noticed by opposing forces: Mohammed Lebjaoui, a member of the National Council of the Algerian Revolution, later said that for him and other leaders in the National Liberation Front, "General de Bollardière always represented in the fight, as an enemy, the honor of the French uniform and flag. He was the only general in the French army in Algeria who compelled and deserved our respect".

In opposition to government policy regarding usage of torture among French units, after the escalation in the violation of human rights during the Battle of Algiers, Bollardière requested to be relieved of command, and returned to France in January 1957. He was sentenced to 60 days of fortress arrest at La Courneuve for "bringing the army into disrepute" by publicly supporting L'Express editor Jean-Jacques Servan-Schreiber's coverage of the war. The only military officer to support him was captain Pierre Dabezies (1925–2002), a left-wing Gaullist who would later lead the 11e Choc elite troop and get close to the socialist Jean-Pierre Chevènement. Bollardière was later assigned to French Equatorial Africa and Germany.

He resigned from the Army after the Algiers putsch, as he was not able to obtain a command in Algeria.

=== Retirement and pacifist activism ===
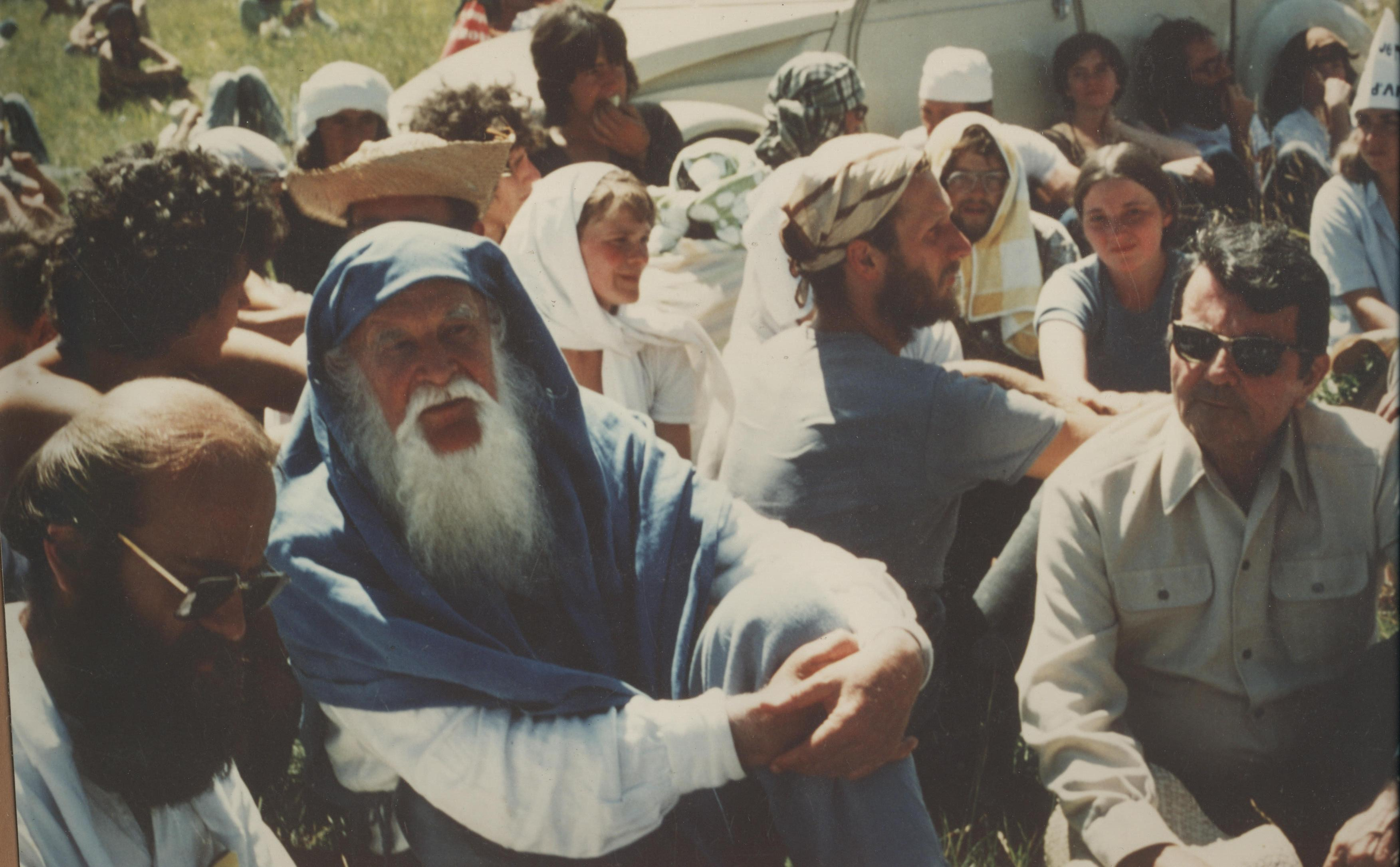
Jacques de Bollardière (right) on the plateau of Larzac, protesting against the extension of the military camp in the 1970s. To his left, the non-violent philosophers Jean-Marie Muller and Lanza del Vasto.

After his withdrawal from active service, Bollardière retired to his native Brittany, joining a naval construction firm in Lorient. After initially taking to his new work with enthusiasm, he quickly became disillusioned after witnessing the alienation of workers' labour, noting that whilst hierarchies in the army had not presented a barrier to good relationships between men of different ranks, in the industrial workplace relations between workers and management were characterised by class conflict. He was driven to study this topic, drawing on Catholic social teaching to consider how this could be remedied. However, despite attempts at reforming workplace relations, he left after two and a half years, convinced that the industrial environment was inherently dehumanising.

Bollardière became a pacifist after a talk by the writer Jean-Marie Muller in Lorient, on 23 October 1970. He subsequently co-founded the Movement for a Non-Violent Alternative, an organisation promoting the principles of non-violence. He was president of the association Logement et Promotion Sociale between 1968 and 1978, focusing on public housing with a particular concentration on immigrants from southern Europe and Africa. He was also involved in adult education and the Breton regionalist movement, believing that the decline of Breton culture and the area's economic underdevelopment were both linked to the centralisation of the French state. In July 1973, he was arrested by the French Navy during protests against nuclear trials in Mururoa, along with journalist Brice Lalonde, priest Jean Toulat and Jean-Marie Muller. The Council of Ministers, then headed by Georges Pompidou, removed him from the army as a disciplinary measure and gave him a pension - up to this point, he had still formally been a general, albeit not serving. The group responded to their detention by going on hunger strike: after five days, Bollardière started suffering from hypertension and was moved to hospital for treatment. Following the incident he returned his Legion of Honour to the French government in protest. He was also a supporter of the successful Fight for the Larzac, which protested against the expansion of a French army camp on the Larzac plateau, a project which was cancelled by François Mitterrand when he was elected President of France in 1981.

Jacques Paris Bollardière died on 22 February 1986 at his residence Vieux-Talhouët and was buried in Vannes, Brittany.

== Honours ==
- Grand officer of the Légion d'honneur
- Companion of the Liberation (23 June 1941)
- Croix de guerre 1939-1945 (5 mentions in despatches)
- Croix de Guerre des théâtres d'opérations extérieures with palm
- Médaille de la Résistance
- Croix de Guerre (Belgium)
- Officer of the Order of the Crown with palm (Belgium)
- Distinguished Service Order and Bar (UK)

== Notes ==
- A homonymous Jacques Pâris de Bollardière, General of Division, has been director of the National Service since September 2004.
