= Larzac =

Geographical area

Coordinates: 43°59′21″N 3°11′00″E

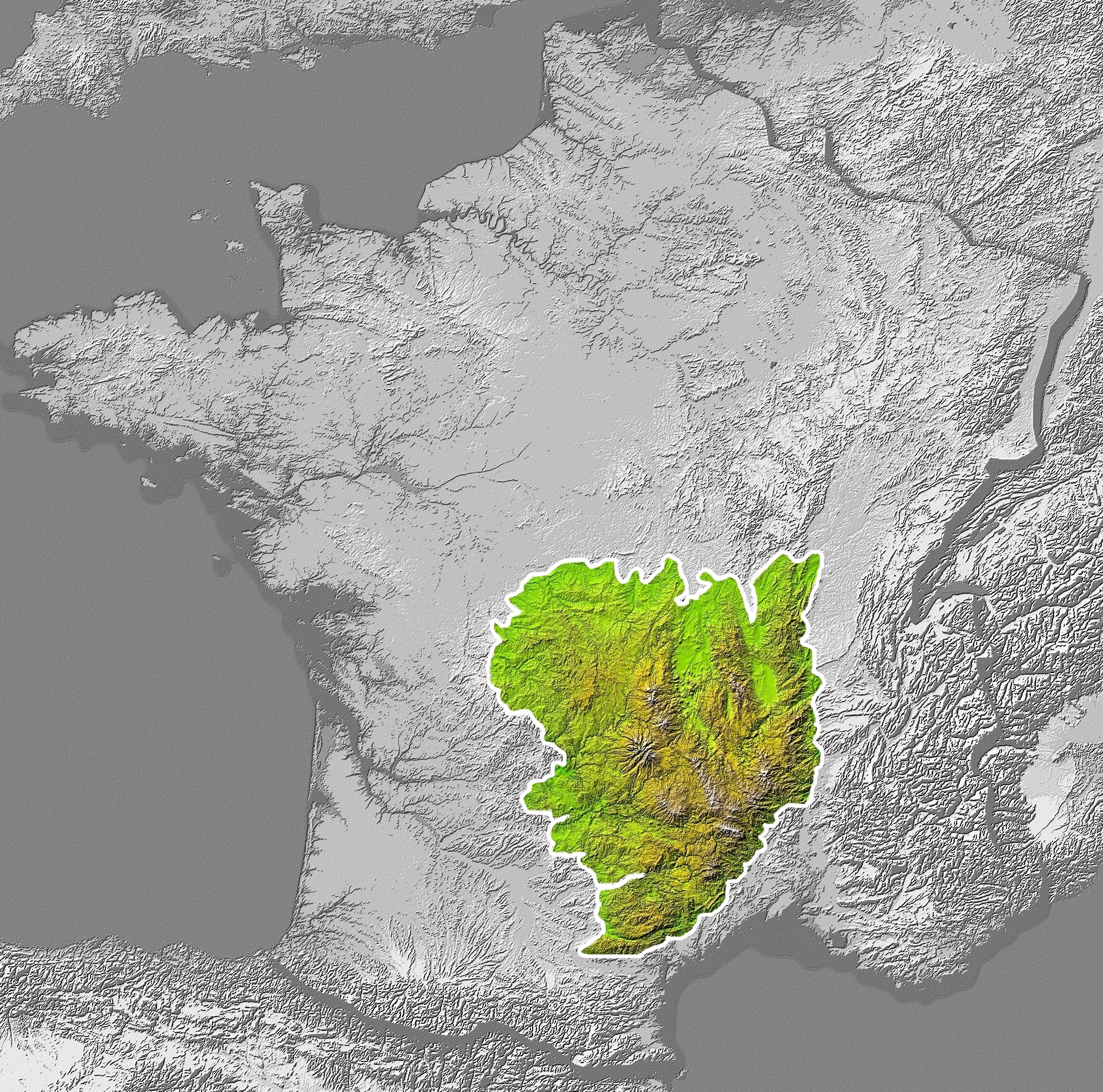
Location of the Massif Central in France

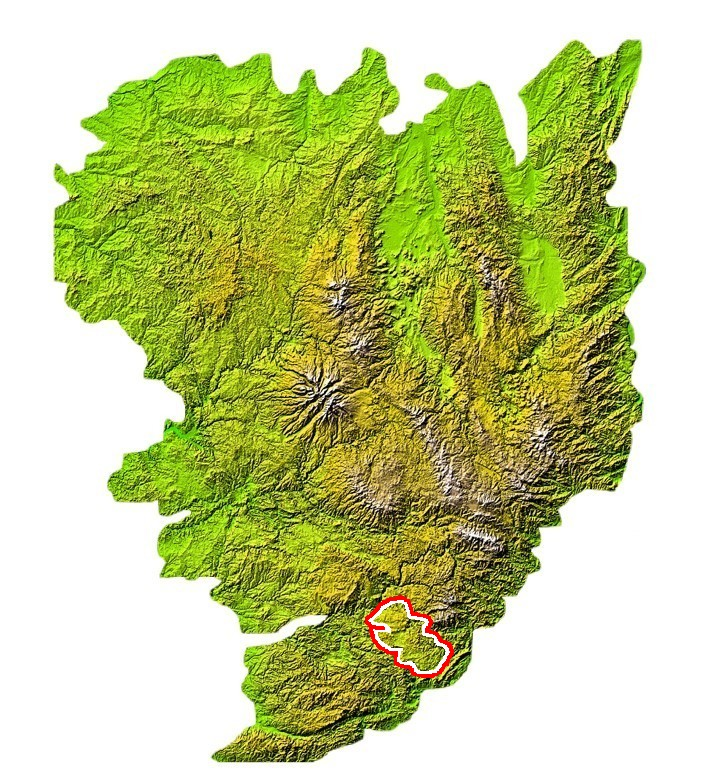
Location of Larzac in the Massif Central

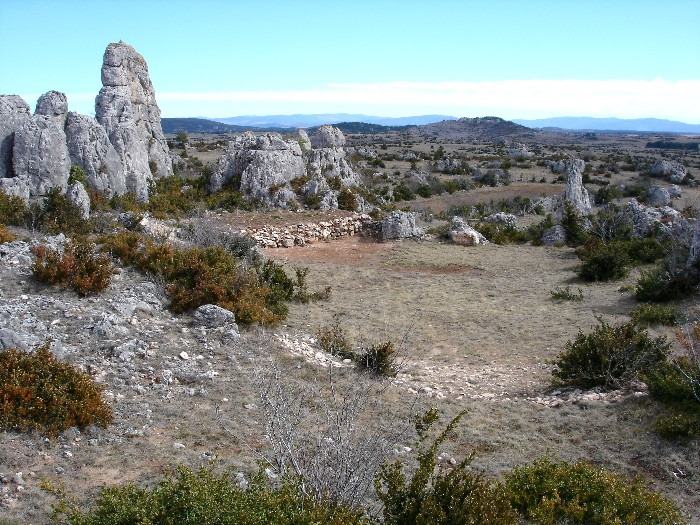
Typical Larzac landscape seen in March 2007

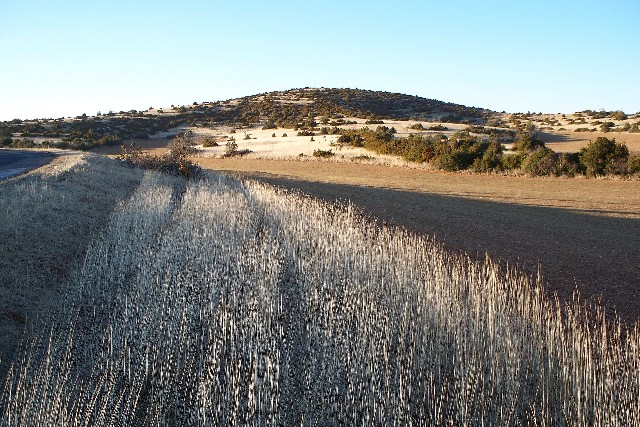
The Cougouille mount, the highest point on the Larzac plateau (912 m/2992 ft above sea level)

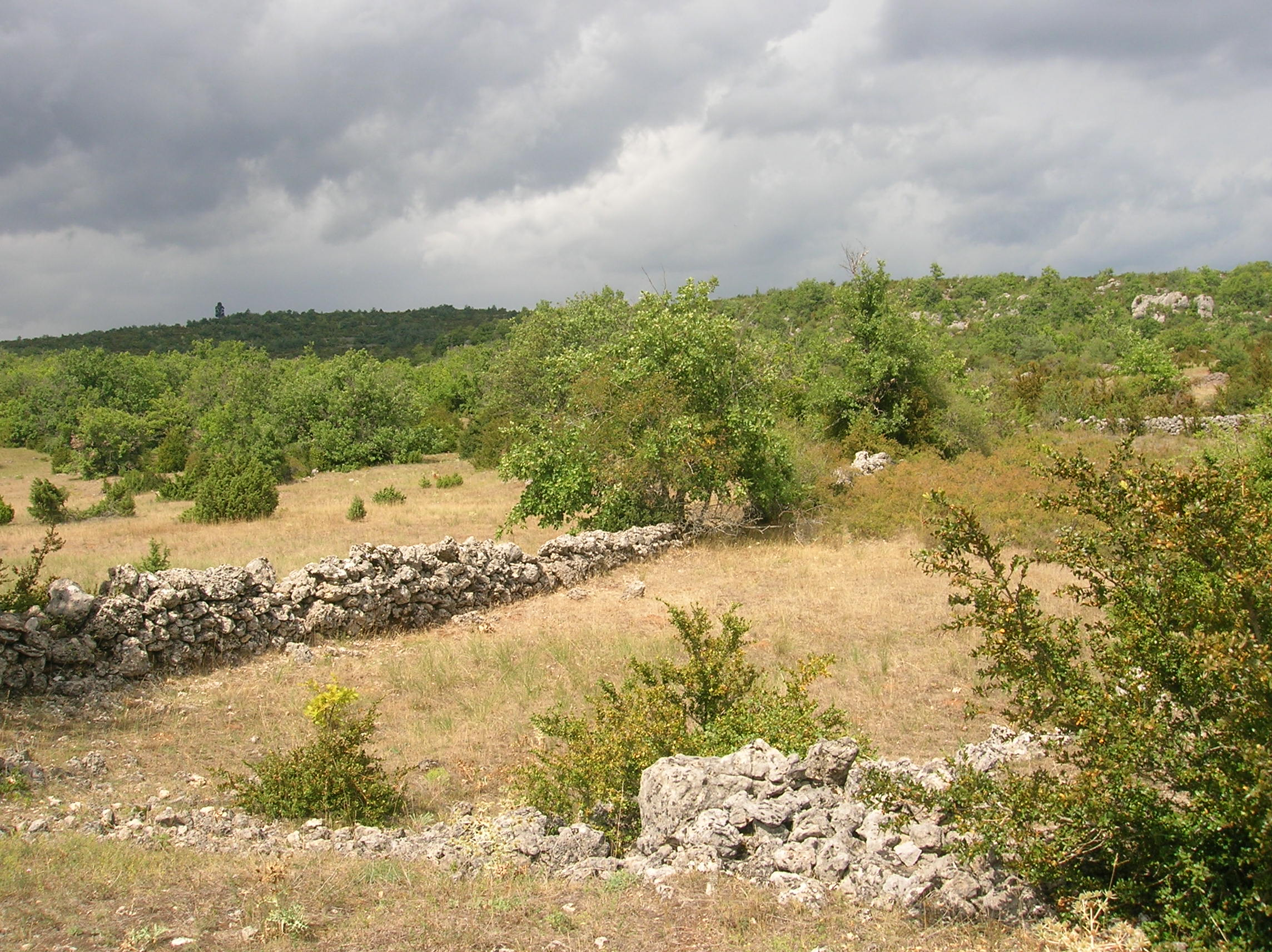
Typical Larzac landscape

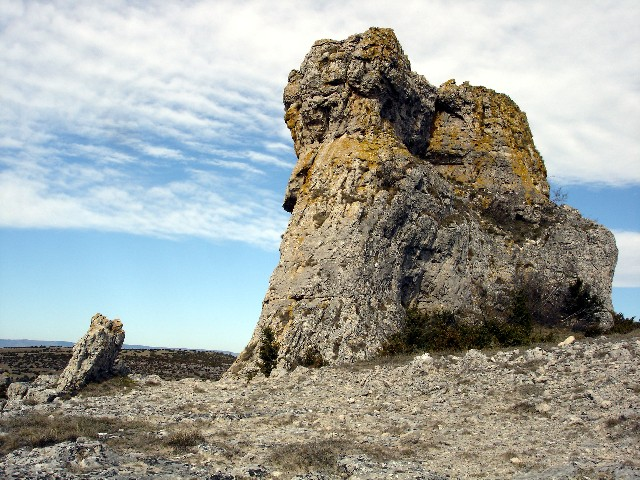
Dolomitic outcrop on the plateau

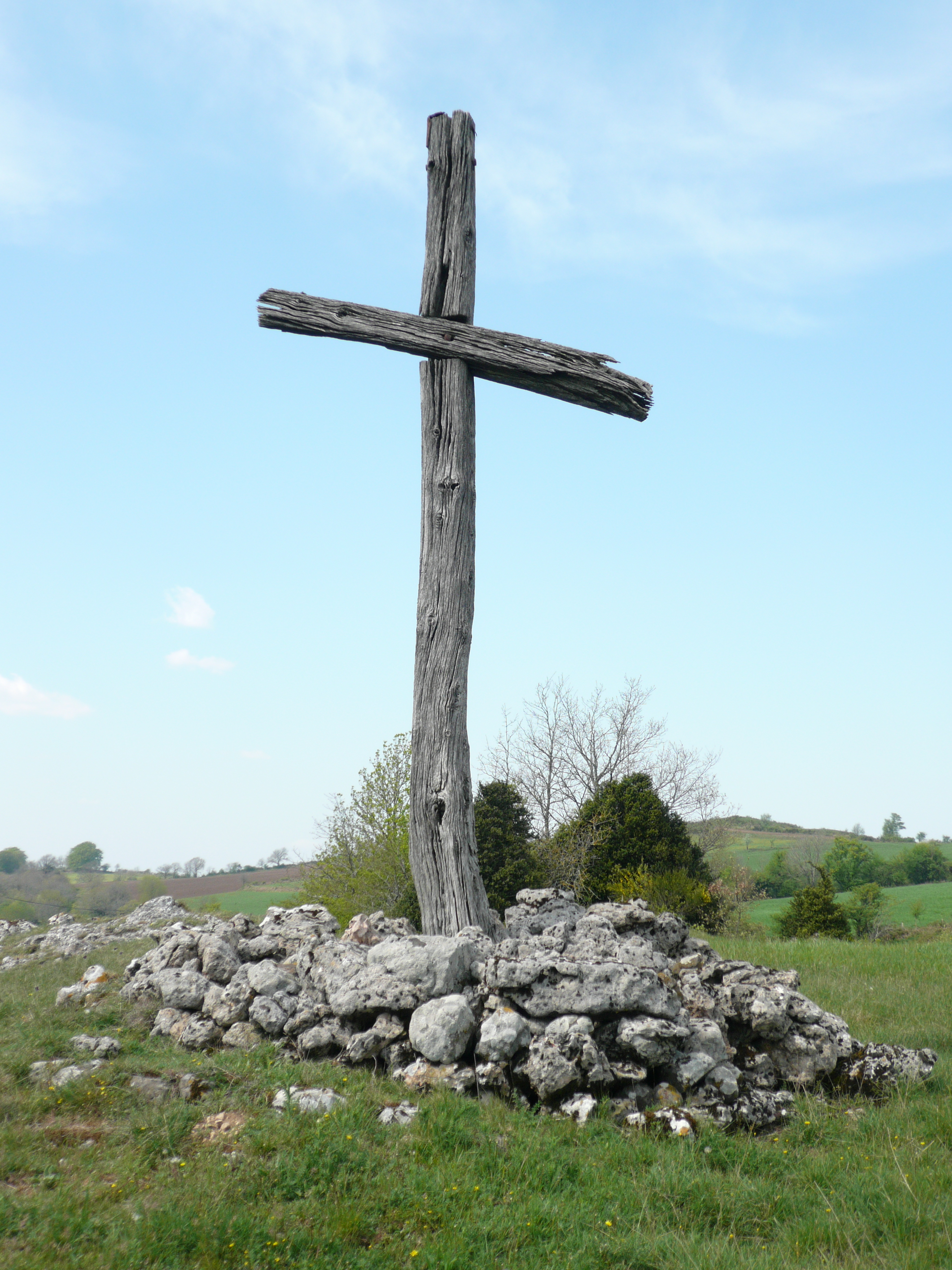
Cross on the Larzac plateau between Les Rives and La Bastide des Fonts

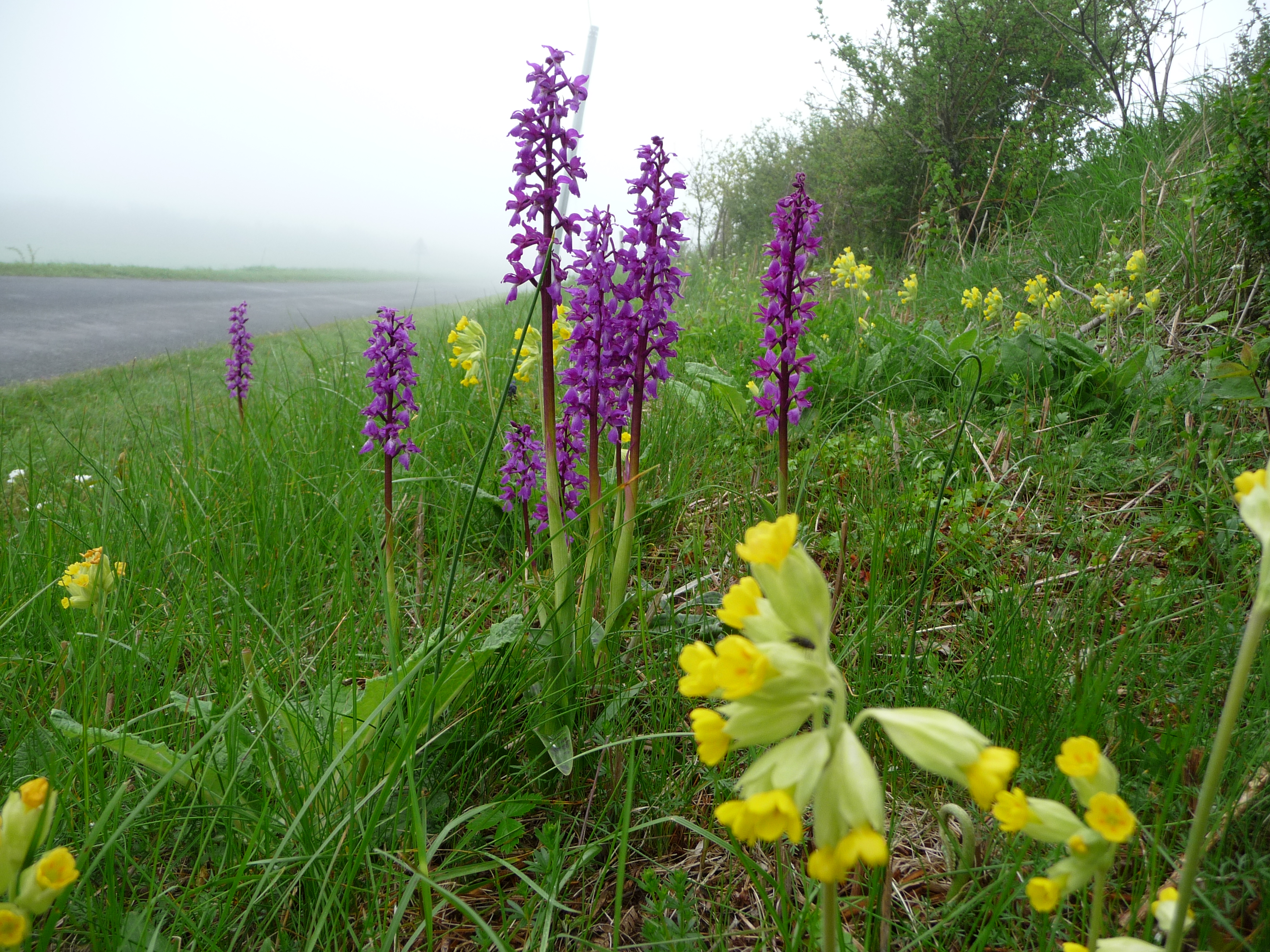
Cowslips and various kinds of orchids are widespread on the Larzac area

Larzac (French pronunciation: [laʁzak], Occitan: [laɾˈzak]), also known as the Causse of Larzac (French: Causse du Larzac; Occitan: Causa de Larzac), is a limestone karst plateau in the south of the Massif Central, France, situated between Millau (in the department of Aveyron) and Lodève (in the department of Hérault). It is an agricultural area, where traditionally sheep produce milk for Roquefort cheese. Since the early 2010s, agricultural production has diversified.

== Geography ==
The communes of the Larzac are:

- Cornus
- Creissels
- La Cavalerie
- La Couvertoirade
- La Roque-Sainte-Marguerite
- L'Hospitalet-du-Larzac
- Le Caylar
- Le Cros
- Les Rives
- Millau
- Nant
- Saint-Félix-de-l'Héras
- Saint-Georges-de-Luzençon
- Saint-Maurice-Navacelles
- Saint-Michel-d'Alajou
- Saint-Pierre-de-la-Fage
- Sainte-Eulalie-de-Cernon
- Sorbs
- La Vacquerie-et-Saint-Martin-de-Castries
- Vissec

The Larzac is served by junctions 46 to 51 of the A75 autoroute.

== History ==
In October 1970, Michel Debré, then Minister of Defence, decided for strategic purposes to expand a military camp outside the village of La Cavalerie in the department of Aveyron, from 30 km^{2} to 170 km^{2}, without consulting the local population. Local farmers objected and decided to fight against the project, through actions such as the occupation of empty farms purchased by the Army in anticipation of this expansion. French syndicalist and peasant activist José Bové moved there during this period in support of the protests. Communards from the nearby Community of the Ark, led by the pacifist Lanza del Vasto, were also very active in opposition to the camp. The workers of the occupied and self-managed LIP factory also took part in the movement.

Following ten years of nonviolent resistance, the plan was cancelled by President François Mitterrand after his election in 1981.

Because of its history, the Larzac was chosen as the site of a massive meeting against the WTO which took place in August 2003. José Bové currently resides in the Larzac area; he secured nearly 500,000 votes in the 2007 presidential election. He became a Member of the European Parliament in 2009.

== Sights ==
Five medieval fortified villages, related to the Knights Templar and the Knights Hospitaller are located on the Larzac plateau:

- La Cavalerie
- La Couvertoirade
- Saint-Jean-d'Alcas, part of the Saint-Jean-et-Saint-Paul commune
- Sainte-Eulalie-de-Cernon
- Viala-du-Pas-de-Jaux
