= Community of the Ark =

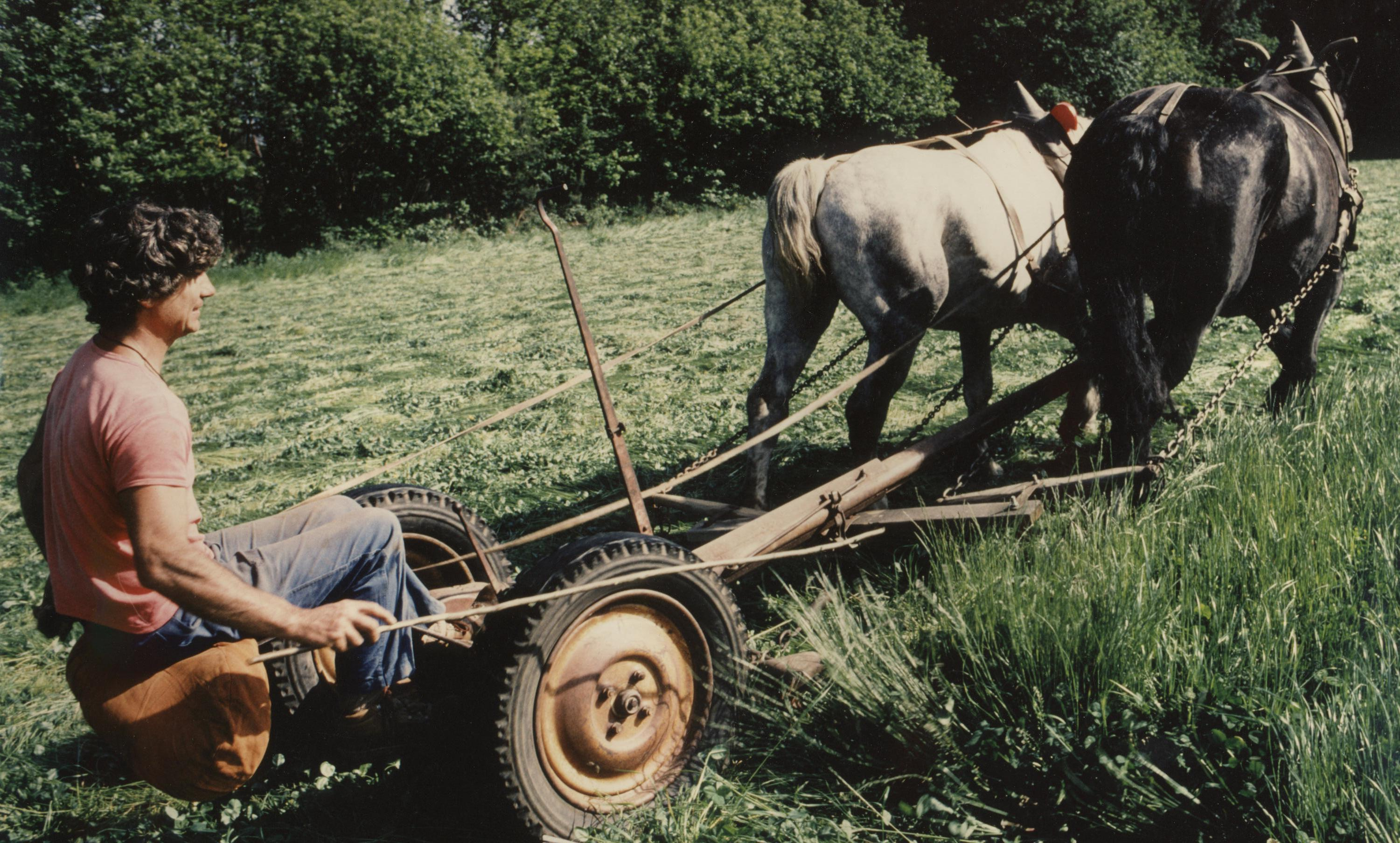
Work with horses in an Ark Community

The Community of the Ark is a small spiritual commune now located in La Borie Noble, France that was founded in the southwest of France in 1948 by Lanza del Vasto. Lanza del Vasto was a non-violence activist and disciple of Mahatma Gandhi. The community is all vegetarian.

== History ==
During the 1970s, many of the communards, under the leadership of del Vasto, took a leading role in the civil disobedience campaign resisting the proposed extension of the military base on the Larzac plateau. The campaign was ultimately triumphant.

In the 1970s, the community spread to several locations, including Italy, Spain and Quebec. In the 1990s, some communities were closed due to conflicts and lack of new members. In Southern France, the community is still active at La Borie Noble in the mountains of Occitanie, located between Beziers and Millau. The official site notes that the communities in France, Spain, Italy, Germany and Brazil are still active.
