= Luc Dietrich =

French writer

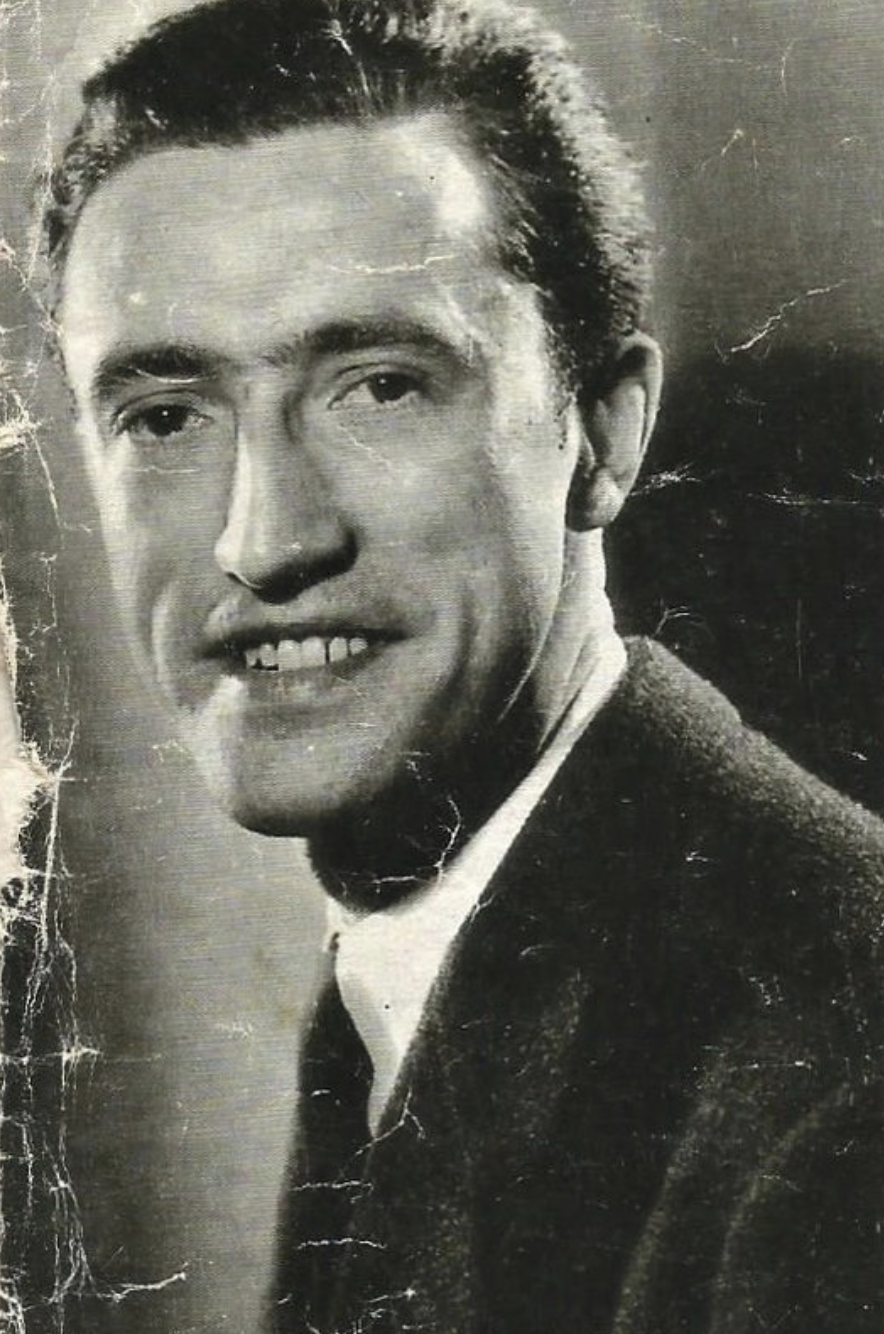

Raoul-Jacques Dietrich, better known as Luc Dietrich (17 March 1913, Dijon – 12 August 1944), was a French writer.

Dietrich was born in Dijon. His father died when he was very young, and his mother was ill and addicted to drugs. She was frequently incapable of taking care of her son; several times he was sent asylums and similar establishments. Shortly after Dietrich's release from one at the age of 18, his mother died.

In 1932 Dietrich met philosopher and poet Lanza del Vasto at the Parc Monceau in Paris. The first thing del Vasto said to Dietrich was "Are you as good as this bread?" The two became inseparable friends for the rest of Dietrich's short life. Lanza helped and mentored Dietrich in writing, although he always refused to be credited as a co-author. Another of Dietrich's famous friends was poet René Daumal. After becoming lightly wounded during a bombardment in 1944, Dietrich developed hemiplegia and then gangrene, and died the same year, aged 31.

He is best known today for his semi-autobiographical novel, Le Bonheur des tristes ("The Happiness of Sad People").

== Works ==
- Huttes à la lisière, 1930
- The Happiness of Sad People (Le Bonheur des tristes), 1935
- Earth (Terre), 1936
- Apprenticeship of the City (L’Apprentissage de la ville), 1942
- Talk of Friendship (Le Dialogue de l’Amitié), with Lanza del Vasto, 1942
- L'Injuste Grandeur, 1943
- Emblèmes végétaux, 1993
- Demain, c’est le possible, 1996
- Poésies, 1996
- L'École des conquérants, 1997
