= La Cavalerie =

Commune in Occitanie, France

- Commune
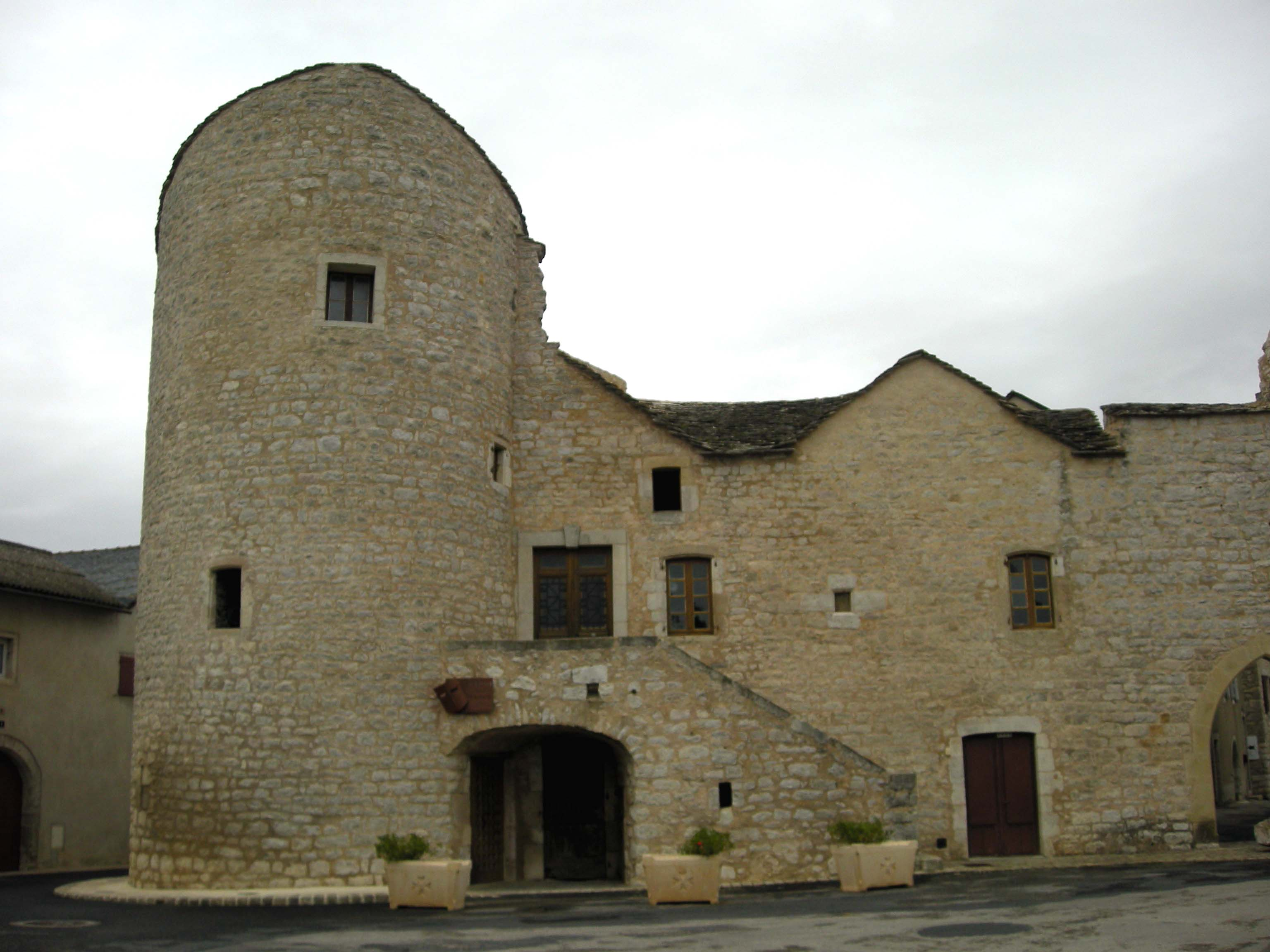
- Restored ramparts
- Location of La Cavalerie
- Location within France Location within Occitanie
- Coordinates: 44°00′35″N 3°09′36″E
- Country: France
- Region: Occitania
- Department: Aveyron
- Arrondissement: Millau
- Canton: Causses-Rougiers

Government
  - Mayor (2020–2026): François Rodriguez
- Area^{1}: 40.56 km^{2} (15.66 sq mi)
- Elevation: 800 m (2,600 ft)
- Highest elevation: 892 m (2,927 ft)
- Lowest elevation: 764 m (2,507 ft)
- Population (2023): 2,223
  - Density: 54.81/km^{2} (142.0/sq mi)
- Time zone: UTC+01:00 (CET)
  - Summer (DST): UTC+02:00 (CEST)
- INSEE/Postal code: 12063 /12230
- ^{1} French Land Register data, which excludes lakes, ponds, glaciers > 1 km^{2} (0.386 sq mi or 247 acres) and river estuaries.

La Cavalerie (French pronunciation: [la kavalʁi]; Occitan: La Cavalariá) is a commune in the Aveyron department in southern France. During the 1970s it became the focal point of peasant resistance to the proposed extension of the Larzac military training base, just to the north.

== Population ==
Historical population
| Year | Pop. | ±% p.a. |
|---|---|---|
| 1968 | 734 | — |
| 1975 | 748 | +0.27% |
| 1982 | 900 | +2.68% |
| 1990 | 701 | −3.08% |
| 1999 | 813 | +1.66% |
| 2007 | 999 | +2.61% |
| 2012 | 1,058 | +1.15% |
| 2017 | 1,441 | +6.37% |
| 2023 | 2,223 | +7.49% |
Source: INSEE

== See also ==
- Communes of the Aveyron department
