= La Couvertoirade =

Commune in Occitanie, France

- Commune
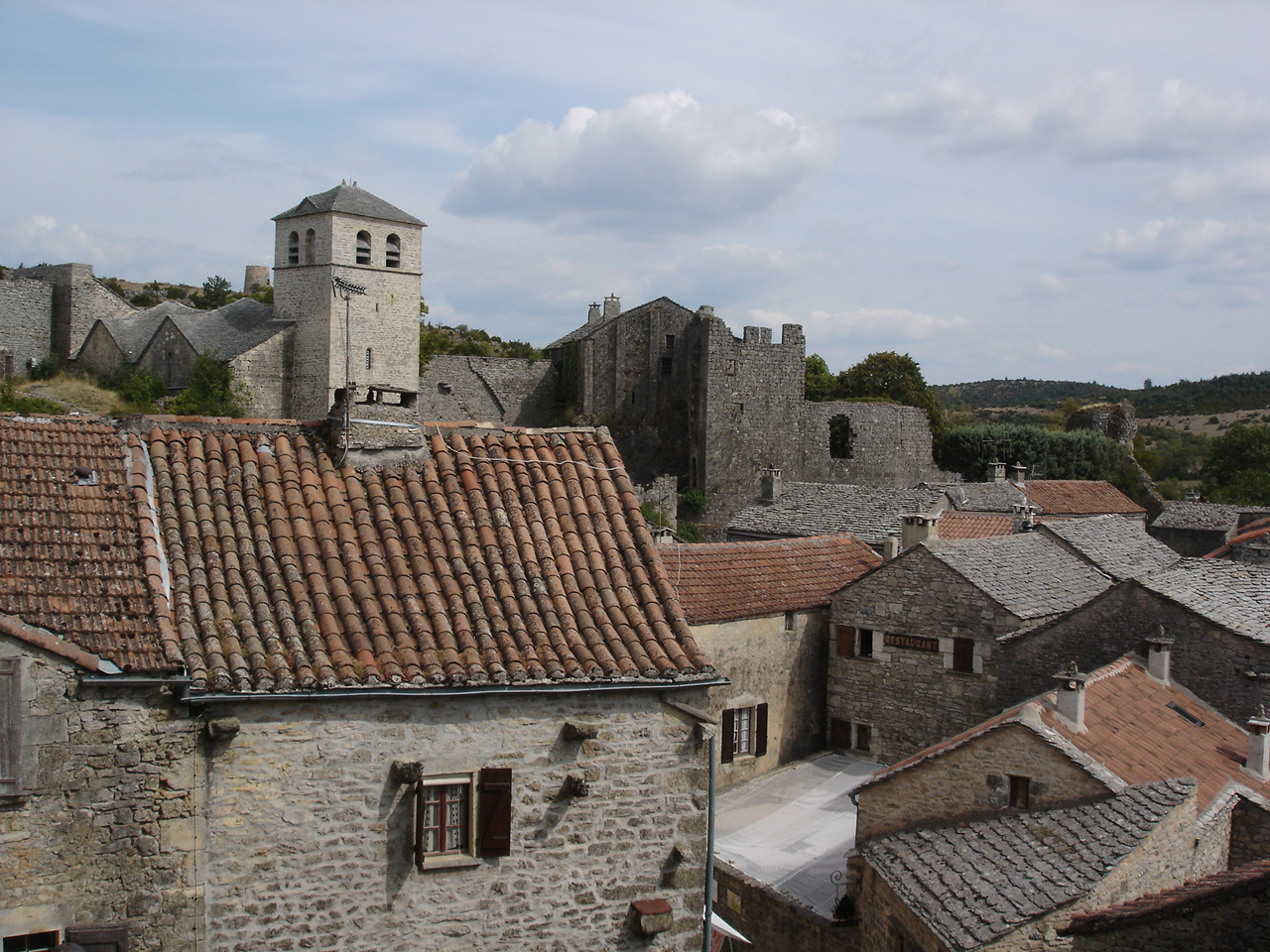
- A general view of La Couvertoirade
- Location of La Couvertoirade
- Location within France Location within Occitanie
- Coordinates: 43°54′50″N 3°19′02″E
- Country: France
- Region: Occitania
- Department: Aveyron
- Arrondissement: Millau
- Canton: Causses-Rougiers

Government
  - Mayor (2020–2026): Maryse Roux
- Area^{1}: 61.91 km^{2} (23.90 sq mi)
- Elevation: 800 m (2,600 ft)
- Highest elevation: 900 m (3,000 ft)
- Lowest elevation: 640 m (2,100 ft)
- Population (2023): 210
  - Density: 3.4/km^{2} (8.8/sq mi)
- Time zone: UTC+01:00 (CET)
  - Summer (DST): UTC+02:00 (CEST)
- INSEE/Postal code: 12082 /12230
- ^{1} French Land Register data, which excludes lakes, ponds, glaciers > 1 km^{2} (0.386 sq mi or 247 acres) and river estuaries.

La Couvertoirade (French pronunciation: [la kuvɛʁtwaʁad]; Occitan: La Cobertoirada) is a commune in the southern French department of Aveyron.

== Geography ==
La Couvertoirade is located on the Larzac plateau.

== History and sites of interest ==
This well-preserved fortified town was owned by the Knights Templar, under orders from the Commandery of Sainte-Eulalie, from the twelfth century. The Templars built the fortress there during the 12th and 13th centuries; its two upper floors have since been removed. Following their dissolution in 1312, the Templars' property in the causses was taken by the Knights of St John of Jerusalem who were responsible for building the curtain wall at La Couvertoirade between 1439 and 1450.

Like other Larzac villages, the population fell rapidly in the 19th century, to as few as 362 by 1880. Today, it is largely inhabited by craftsmen working with enamel, pottery, weaving and similar crafts. It belongs to the association known as Les Plus Beaux Villages de France (the most beautiful villages of France).

== Population ==
Historical population
Year	Pop.	±% p.a.
1968	120	—
1975	107	−1.62%
1982	134	+3.27%
1990	148	+1.25%
1999	153	+0.37%
2007	176	+1.77%
2012	177	+0.11%
2017	188	+1.21%
2023	210	+1.86%
Source: INSEE

== See also ==
- Communes of the Aveyron department
