= Lanza del Vasto =

Italian activist

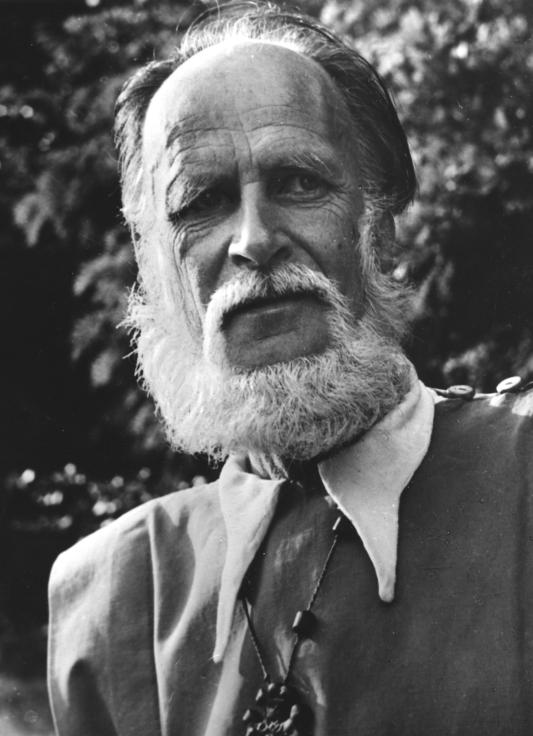
- Lanza del Vasto
- Born: Giuseppe Giovanni Luigi Enrico Lanza di Trabia-Branciforte; 29 September 1901; San Vito dei Normanni, Italy
- Died: 5 January 1981 (aged 79); Murcia, Spain
- Occupations: Poet and nonviolent activist

Lanza del Vasto (born Giuseppe Giovanni Luigi Maria Enrico Lanza di Trabia-Branciforte; 29 September 1901 – 5 January 1981) was an Italian poet and nonviolent activist.

== Youth in Italy ==
His father, Don Luigi Giuseppe Lanza di Trabia-Branciforte, was Sicilian and his mother, Anne-Marie Henriette Nauts-Oedenkoven, was born in Antwerp, in Belgium. Very early he traveled in Italy and Europe. He entered the University of Pisa in 1922.

== Meeting Gandhi ==
In December 1936, Lanza went to India, joining the movement for Indian independence led by Gandhi. He knew of Gandhi through a book by Romain Rolland. He spent six months with the Mahatma, then in June 1937, went to the sources of the Ganges and the Yamuna rivers in the Himalayas, a famous pilgrimage site. There he saw a vision which told him "Go back and found!"

He then returned to Europe. In 1938, he went to Palestine, then in the midst of civil war, to Jerusalem and Bethlehem, "between two lines of tanks".

He came back to Paris at the time when the Second World War started. He wrote some books of poetry and in 1943 published the story of his trip to India, Return to the Source.

== Foundation of the Ark ==
He founded the Community of the Ark in 1948 which first met with many difficulties. In 1954, he returned to India to participate in nonviolent anti-feudal struggles with Vinoba Bhave.

In 1962, the Community of the Ark settled in Haut-Languedoc, in the south of France, at "La Borie Noble", near Lodève, in a deserted village. After numbering over a hundred members in the 1970s and 1980s, some communities were closed in the 1990s due to conflicts, ageing population (under thirty members) and a lack of interest in their work and lifestyle. Since 2000, groups are present in a few regions of France, in Belgium, Spain, Italy, Ecuador and Canada.

== Nonviolent activism ==
In 1957, during the Algerian War, del Vasto started with other well-known people (General de Bollardière, François Mauriac, Robert Barrat, etc.) a movement of protest against torture. He fasted for 21 days. In 1958, he demonstrated against the nuclear power plant in Marcoule, France, which produced plutonium for nuclear weapons.

In 1963, he fasted for 40 days in Rome during the Second Vatican Council, asking Pope John XXIII to stand against war - "Pour demander au Pape de prendre position contre la guerre."

In 1965, he was at the Universidad Nacional de La Plata, Argentina, talking about non-violence during weeks with the students.

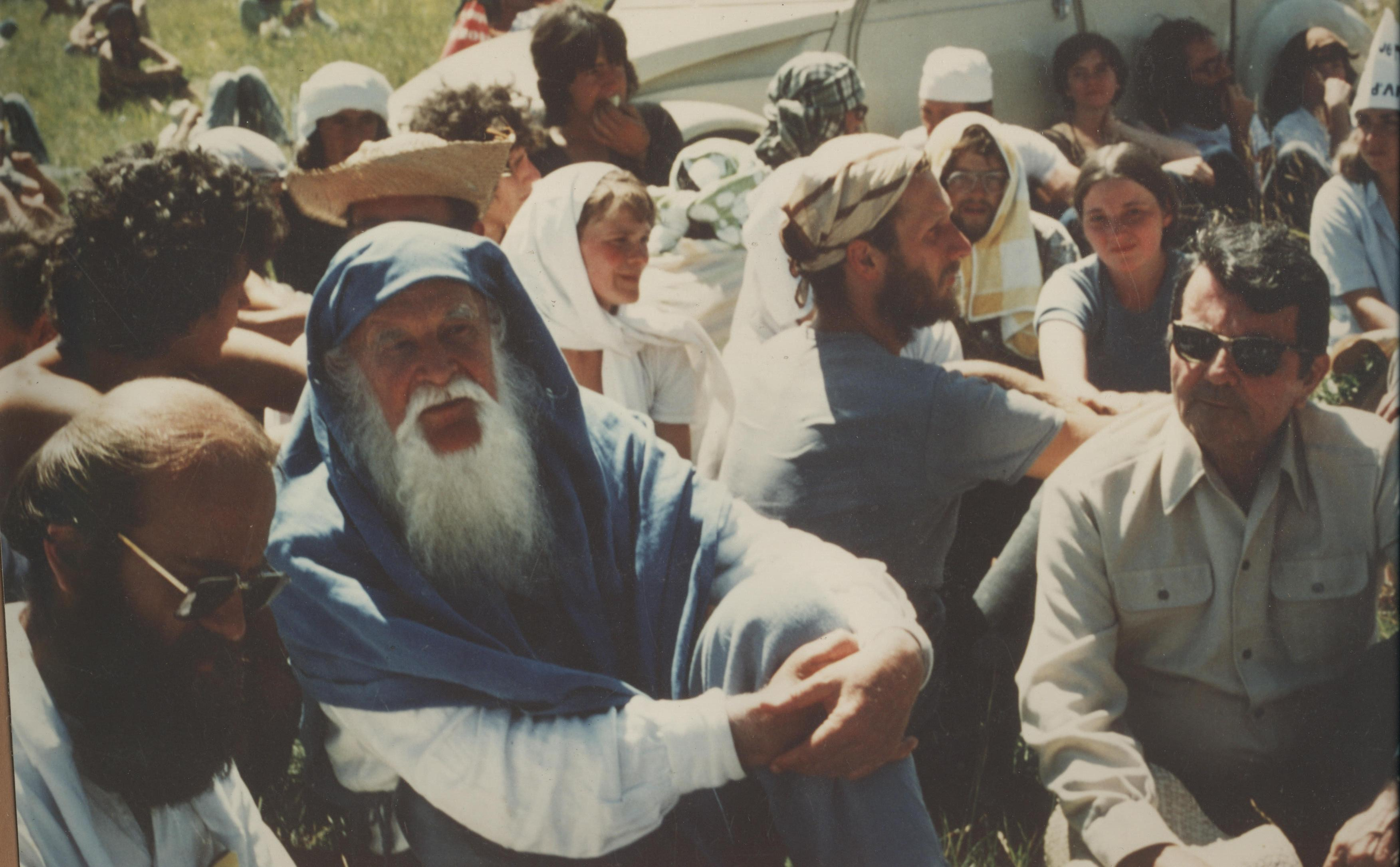
Left to right, Jean-Marie Muller, Lanza del Vasto, Jacques de la Bollardière on the Larzac during the struggle against the military camp extension.

In 1972, he supported the farmers of the Larzac plateau against the extension of a military base while fasting for 15 days. In 1974, a community of the Ark settled in the Larzac in a farmhouse bought by the army.

In 1976, he participated in the demonstrations against the building of the fast breeder reactor Superphénix at Creys-Malville, Isère (France).

== Death ==
In January 1981, del Vasto was working to found a new community in Elche de la Sierra, in the Spanish province of Albacete, when on 5 January, he had a brain hemorrhage and was taken to the hospital of Ciudad Sanitaria Virgen de La Arrixaca in Murcia. He died there on 6 Jan.

== See also ==
- List of peace activists

== Bibliography ==
- Ballades aux Dames du temps présent, Paris, 1923.
- Conquiste du Vento, Florence, 1927.
- Fantasia Notturna, théâtre, Florence, 1927.
- Judas, récit biblique, Grasset, 1938, Gallimard, 1992.
- Le Chiffre des Choses, poésies, Robert Laffont, 1942.
- Le Pélerinage aux Sources, Denoël, 1943, Gallimard, 1989, Le Rocher, 1993.
- Dialogue de l'Amitié, avec Luc Dietrich (Laffont, 1942, 1993).
- Choix, poésies, Le Seuil, 1944.
- La Marche des Rois, théâtre, R. Laffont, 1944.
- Principes et préceptes du retour à l'évidence, Denoël, 1945, Le Rocher, 1996 sous le titre Eloge de la vie simple.
- La Baronne de Carins, bilingue, poème épique traduit du vieux sicilien, Le Seuil, 1946.
- La Passion, théâtre, Grasset, 1951.
- Commentaire de l'Evangile, Denoël, 1951, Le Rocher, 1994.
- Histoire d'une amitié, dans L'Injuste Grandeur de Luc Dietrich, Denoël, 1951, Le Rocher, 1993.
- Vinoba, ou le nouveau pélerinage, Denoël, 1954, Gallimard, 1982.
- Préfaces aux huit ouvrages de la collection Pensée gandhienne, Denoël, 1985–1965.
- Les Quatre Fléaux, philosophie, Denoël, 1959, Le Rocher, 1993.
- Pacification en Algérie, ou mensonge et violence, édition clandestine, 1960, L'Harmattan, 1988.
- Approches de la Vie Intérieure, Denoël, 1962, Le Rocher, 1992.
- Noé, théâtre, Denoël, 1965.
- La Montée des âmes vivantes, Denoël, 1968.
- L'Homme libre et les ânes sauvages, Denoël, 1969 et 1987.
- La Trinité spirituelle, philosophie, Denoël, 1971, Le Rocher, 1994.
- Technique de la non-violence, Denoël, 1971, Gallimard, 1988.
- Préface au Message Retrouvé de Louis Cattiaux (nombreuses traductions en castillan, catalan, italien, anglais, allemand, portugais), Denoël, 1956.
- L'Arche avait pour voilure une vigne, Denoël, 1978, 1982.
- Les etymologies imaginaires: Verite, vie et vertu des mots, Denoël, 1985. (ISBN 2207230090)
- David Berger, théâtre, Lion de Judas, 1988.
- Pour éviter la fin du monde, Le Rocher, 1991.
- Le Viatique, 2 tomes, Le Rocher, 1991.
- Les Quatre Pilliers de la paix, Le Rocher, 1992.
- Le Grand Retour, Le Rocher, 1993. (ISBN 2268015343)
- Pages d'enseignement, Le Rocher, 1993. (ISBN 2268016072)

== Books in English ==
- Return to the Source, Schocken, New York, 1972. Includes an account of Shantidas's stay with Gandhi. (ISBN 0805234411)
- Make Straight the Way of the Lord: An Anthology of the Philosophical Writings of Lanza del Vasto, Knopf, New York, 1974. (ISBN 0394493877)
- Warriors of Peace: Writings on the Technique of Nonviolence, Knopf, New York, 1974. (ISBN 0394709330)
- Principles and Precepts of the Return to the Obvious, Shocken, New York, 1974. (ISBN 9780805235364) (Originally published in French under the title "Principes et préceptes du retour à l'évidence", Editions Denoël, Paris, 1945).
- Gandhi to Vinoba: The New Pilgrimage, Shocken, New York, 1974. (ISBN 080523554X) (Reprint from Rider, London, 1956) (translated by Philip Leon from Vinoba, ou le nouveau pélerinage, Denoël, 1954)

== Essays on Lanza del Vasto ==
- Qui est Lanza del Vasto, by Jacques Madaule,
- Lanza del Vasto, by Arnaud de Mareuil (Seghers, 1965)
- Dialogues avec Lanza del Vasto, by René Doumerc (Albin Michel)
- Les Facettes de Cristal, interviews with Claude-Henri Roquet (Éditions du Centurion)
- Lanza del Vasto, sa vie, son œuvre, son message, by Arnaud de Mareuil (Dangles)
