= Saint-Félix-de-l'Héras =

- Commune
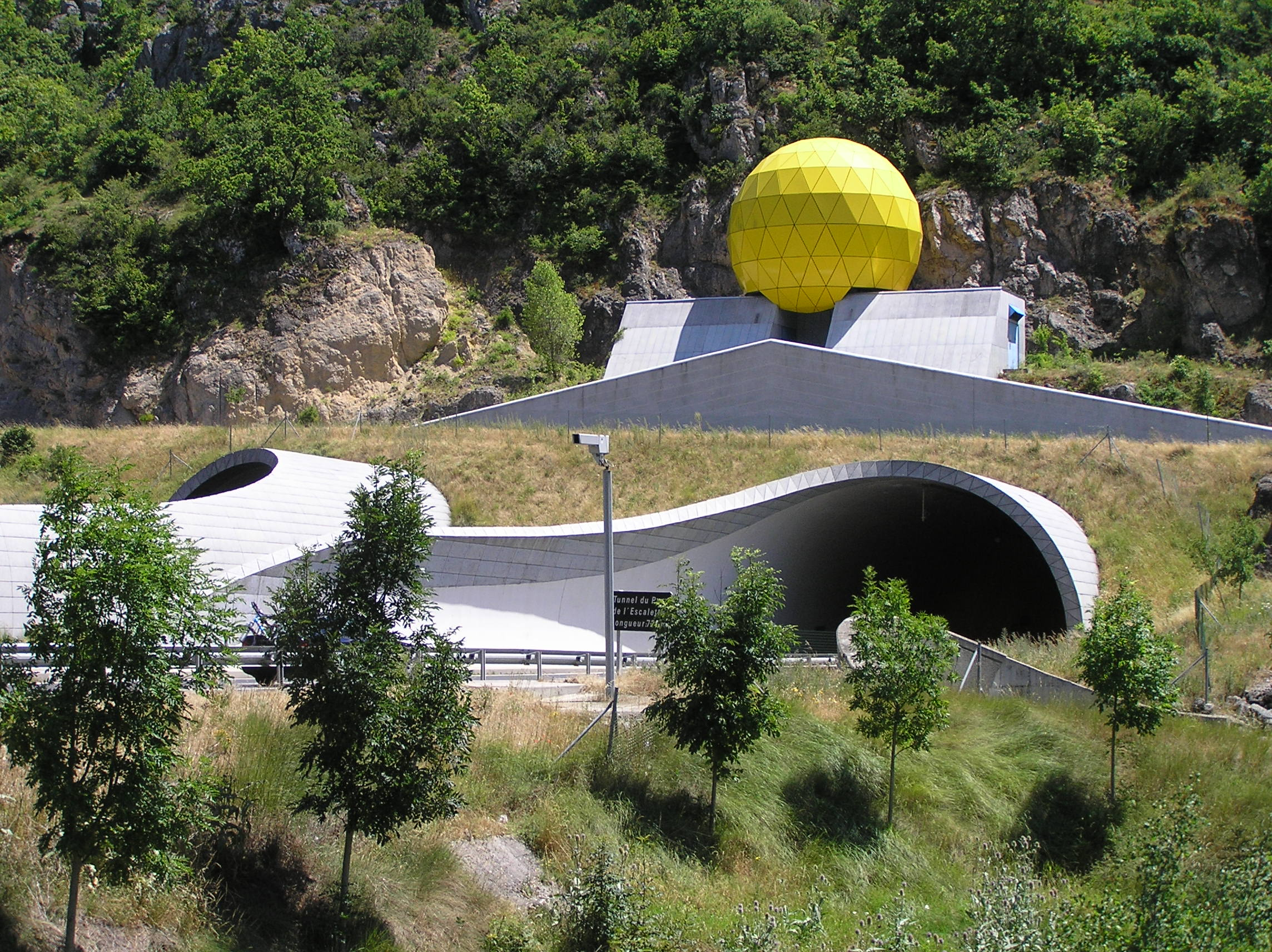
- The Pas de l'Escalette Tunnel
- Location of Saint-Félix-de-l'Héras
- Location within France Location within Occitanie
- Coordinates: 43°50′10″N 3°18′07″E
- Country: France
- Region: Occitania
- Department: Hérault
- Arrondissement: Lodève
- Canton: Lodève

Government
  - Mayor (2020–2026): Françoise Olivier
- Area^{1}: 12.92 km^{2} (4.99 sq mi)
- Elevation: 650 m (2,130 ft)
- Highest elevation: 824 m (2,703 ft)
- Lowest elevation: 600 m (2,000 ft)
- Population (2023): 33
  - Density: 2.6/km^{2} (6.6/sq mi)
- Time zone: UTC+01:00 (CET)
  - Summer (DST): UTC+02:00 (CEST)
- INSEE/Postal code: 34253 /34520
- ^{1} French Land Register data, which excludes lakes, ponds, glaciers > 1 km^{2} (0.386 sq mi or 247 acres) and river estuaries.

Saint-Félix-de-l'Héras (Languedocien: Sant Feliç de Leraç) is a commune in the Hérault department in the Occitanie region in southern France.

== Population ==
Historical population
Year	Pop.	±% p.a.
1968	45	—
1975	26	−7.54%
1982	28	+1.06%
1990	35	+2.83%
1999	29	−2.07%
2007	35	+2.38%
2012	35	+0.00%
2017	34	−0.58%
2023	33	−0.50%
Source: INSEE

== See also ==
- Communes of the Hérault department
