= La Vacquerie-et-Saint-Martin-de-Castries =

La Vacquerie et Saint-Martin-de-Castries
- Commune
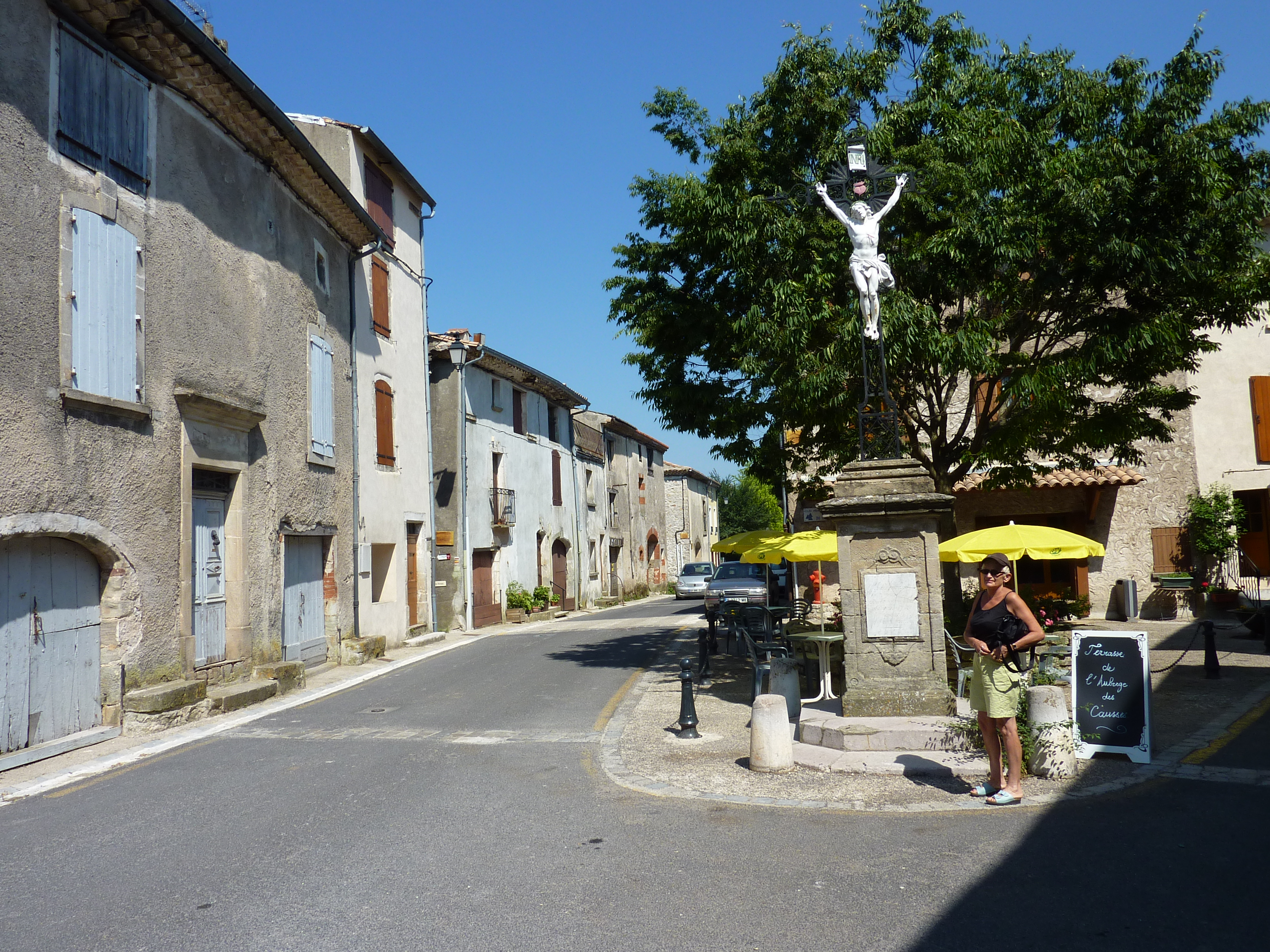
- A general view of La Vacquerie-et-Saint-Martin-de-Castries

- Coat of arms
- Location of La Vacquerie et Saint-Martin-de-Castries
- Location within France Location within Occitanie
- Coordinates: 43°47′24″N 3°27′40″E
- Country: France
- Region: Occitania
- Department: Hérault
- Arrondissement: Lodève
- Canton: Lodève
- Intercommunality: Lodévois - Larzac

Government
  - Mayor (2020–2026): Martine Baïsset
- Area^{1}: 43.05 km^{2} (16.62 sq mi)
- Highest elevation: 822 m (2,697 ft)
- Lowest elevation: 573 m (1,880 ft)
- Population (2023): 210
  - Density: 4.9/km^{2} (13/sq mi)
- Time zone: UTC+01:00 (CET)
  - Summer (DST): UTC+02:00 (CEST)
- INSEE/Postal code: 34317 /34520
- ^{1} French Land Register data, which excludes lakes, ponds, glaciers > 1 km^{2} (0.386 sq mi or 247 acres) and river estuaries.

La Vacquerie-et-Saint-Martin-de-Castries (French pronunciation: [la vakʁi e sɛ̃ maʁtɛ̃ də kastʁi]; Occitan: La Vacariá e Sant Martin de Castrias) is a commune in the Hérault department in the Occitanie region in southern France.

== Population ==
Historical population
Year	Pop.	±% p.a.
1968	109	—
1975	81	−4.15%
1982	85	+0.69%
1990	103	+2.43%
1999	119	+1.62%
2007	135	+1.59%
2012	171	+4.84%
2017	190	+2.13%
2023	210	+1.68%
Source: INSEE

== See also ==
- Communes of the Hérault department
