= Saint-Pierre-de-la-Fage =

- Commune
- Coat of arms
- Location of Saint-Pierre-de-la-Fage
- Location within France Location within Occitanie
- Coordinates: 43°47′38″N 3°25′36″E
- Country: France
- Region: Occitania
- Department: Hérault
- Arrondissement: Lodève
- Canton: Lodève
- Intercommunality: Lodévois-Larzac

Government
  - Mayor (2020–2026): Pierre Bousquet
- Area^{1}: 18.6 km^{2} (7.2 sq mi)
- Elevation: 626 m (2,054 ft)
- Highest elevation: 780 m (2,560 ft)
- Lowest elevation: 360 m (1,180 ft)
- Population (2023): 122
  - Density: 6.56/km^{2} (17.0/sq mi)
- Time zone: UTC+01:00 (CET)
  - Summer (DST): UTC+02:00 (CEST)
- INSEE/Postal code: 34283 /34520
- ^{1} French Land Register data, which excludes lakes, ponds, glaciers > 1 km^{2} (0.386 sq mi or 247 acres) and river estuaries.

Saint-Pierre-de-la-Fage (French pronunciation: [sɛ̃ pjɛʁ də la faʒ]; Languedocien: Sant Pèire de la Faja) is a commune in the Hérault department in the Occitanie region in southern France.

== Population ==
Historical population
Year	Pop.	±% p.a.
1968	57	—
1975	49	−2.14%
1982	56	+1.93%
1990	76	+3.89%
1999	87	+1.51%
2007	115	+3.55%
2012	108	−1.25%
2017	130	+3.78%
2023	122	−1.05%
Source: INSEE

== See also ==
- Communes of the Hérault department
