= Sainte-Eulalie-de-Cernon =

Commune in Occitanie, France

- Commune
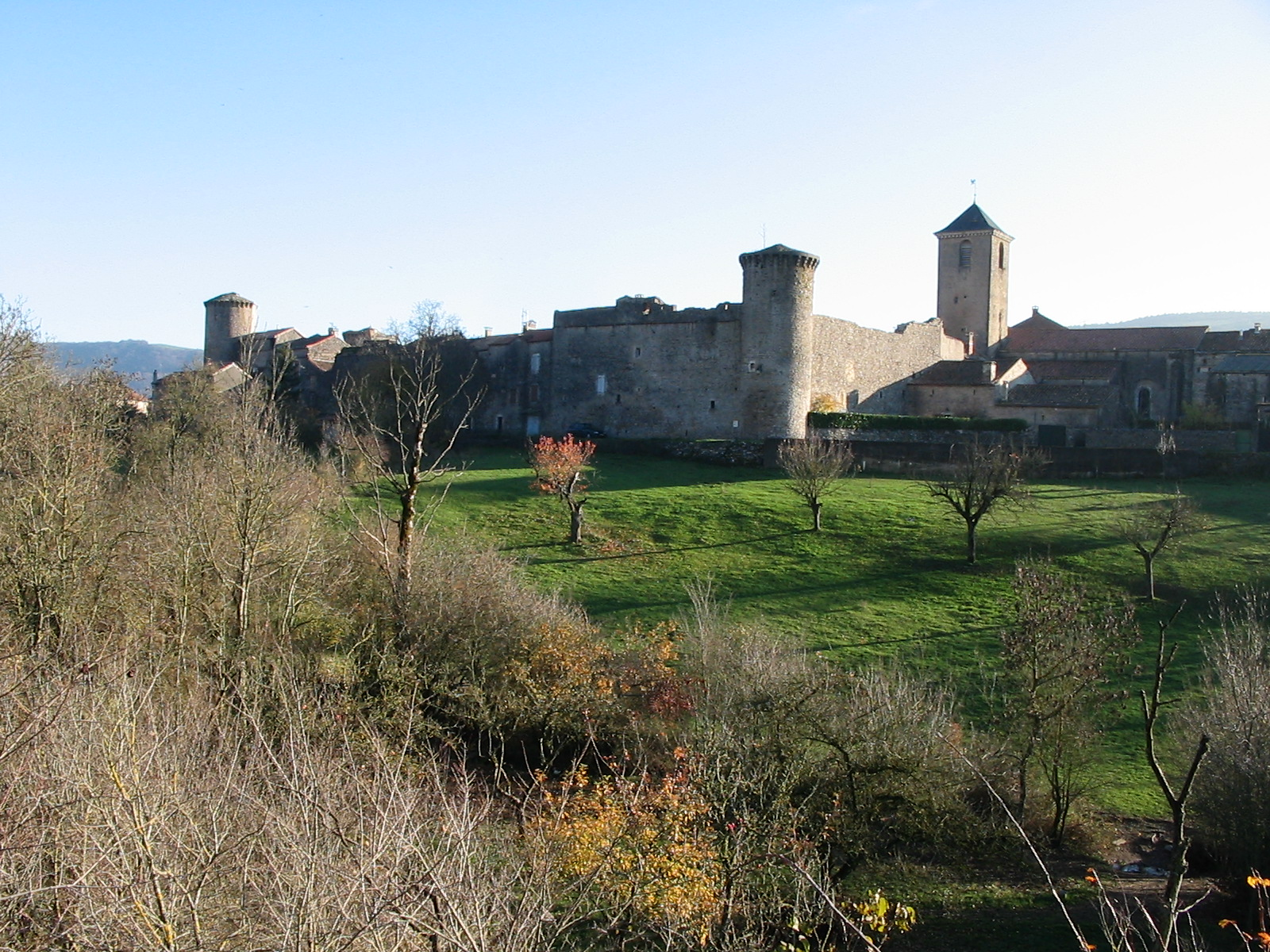
- The fortified hospital

- Coat of arms
- Location of Sainte-Eulalie-de-Cernon
- Location within France Location within Occitanie
- Coordinates: 43°58′57″N 3°08′13″E
- Country: France
- Region: Occitania
- Department: Aveyron
- Arrondissement: Millau
- Canton: Causses-Rougiers
- Intercommunality: Larzac et Vallées

Government
  - Mayor (2020–2026): Thierry Cadenet
- Area^{1}: 46.35 km^{2} (17.90 sq mi)
- Elevation: 635 m (2,083 ft)
- Highest elevation: 912 m (2,992 ft)
- Lowest elevation: 529 m (1,736 ft)
- Population (2023): 325
  - Density: 7.01/km^{2} (18.2/sq mi)
- Time zone: UTC+01:00 (CET)
  - Summer (DST): UTC+02:00 (CEST)
- INSEE/Postal code: 12220 /12230
- ^{1} French Land Register data, which excludes lakes, ponds, glaciers > 1 km^{2} (0.386 sq mi or 247 acres) and river estuaries.

Sainte-Eulalie-de-Cernon (French pronunciation: [sɛ̃.t‿ølali də sɛʁnɔ̃]; Occitan: Senta Aulària de Sarnon) is a commune in the southern French department of Aveyron.

At the heart of the historic settlement is the Commandery of Saint Eulalia, a medieval hospital established by the Order of the Knights Templar. After that Order was disbanded by Philip IV of France in 1307-1308, royal forces were sent to close the hospital down, and from that event a detailed account of the buildings, their contents, both in the chapel and in the secular parts of the complex, and the life and customs of the occupants, has survived.

The Commandery came under the control of the Knights Hospitallers during the Hundred Years War and survived until its final destruction as a result of the French Revolution towards the end of the eighteenth century.

Many medieval buildings survive, together with later ones, inside high defensive walls.

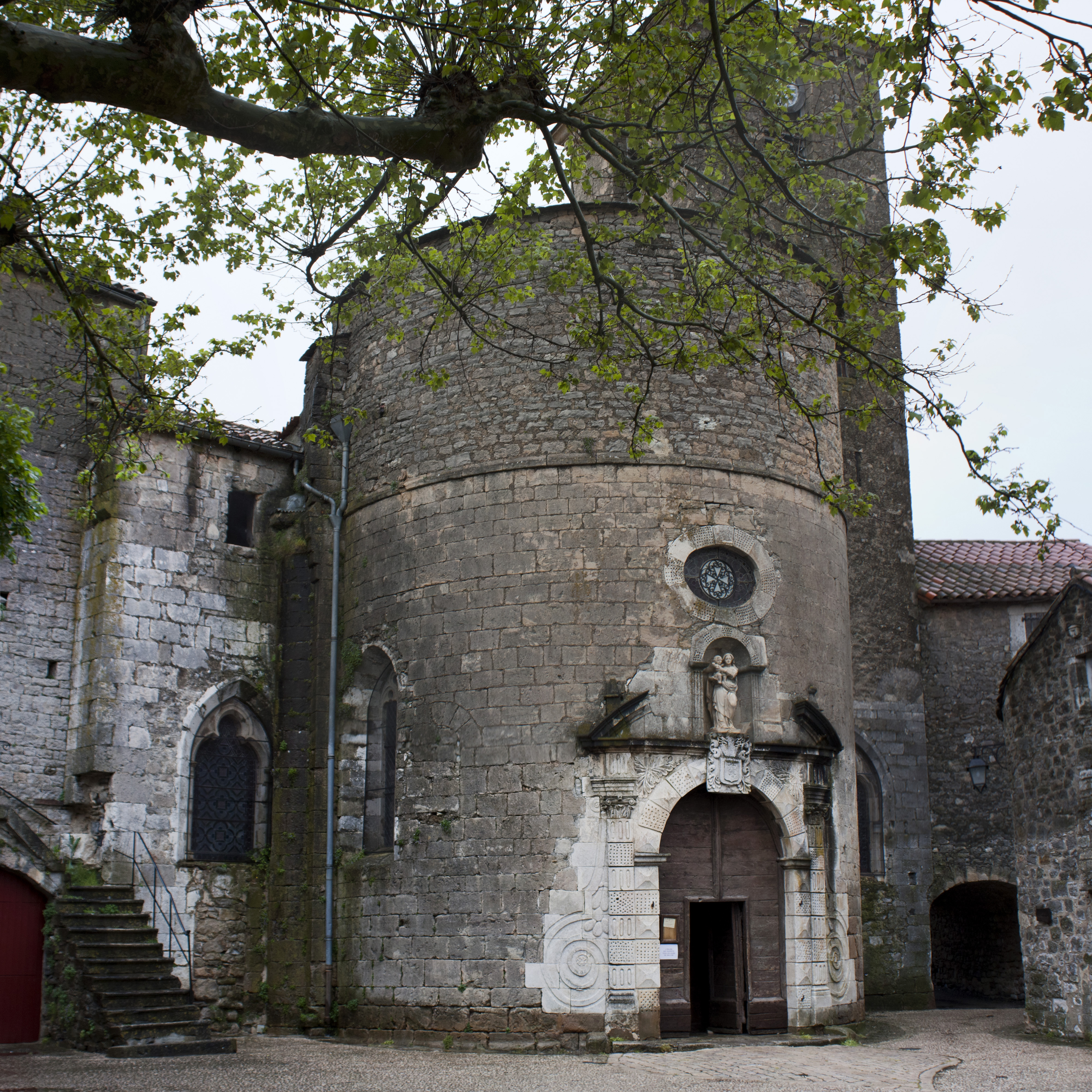
Entrance of the church

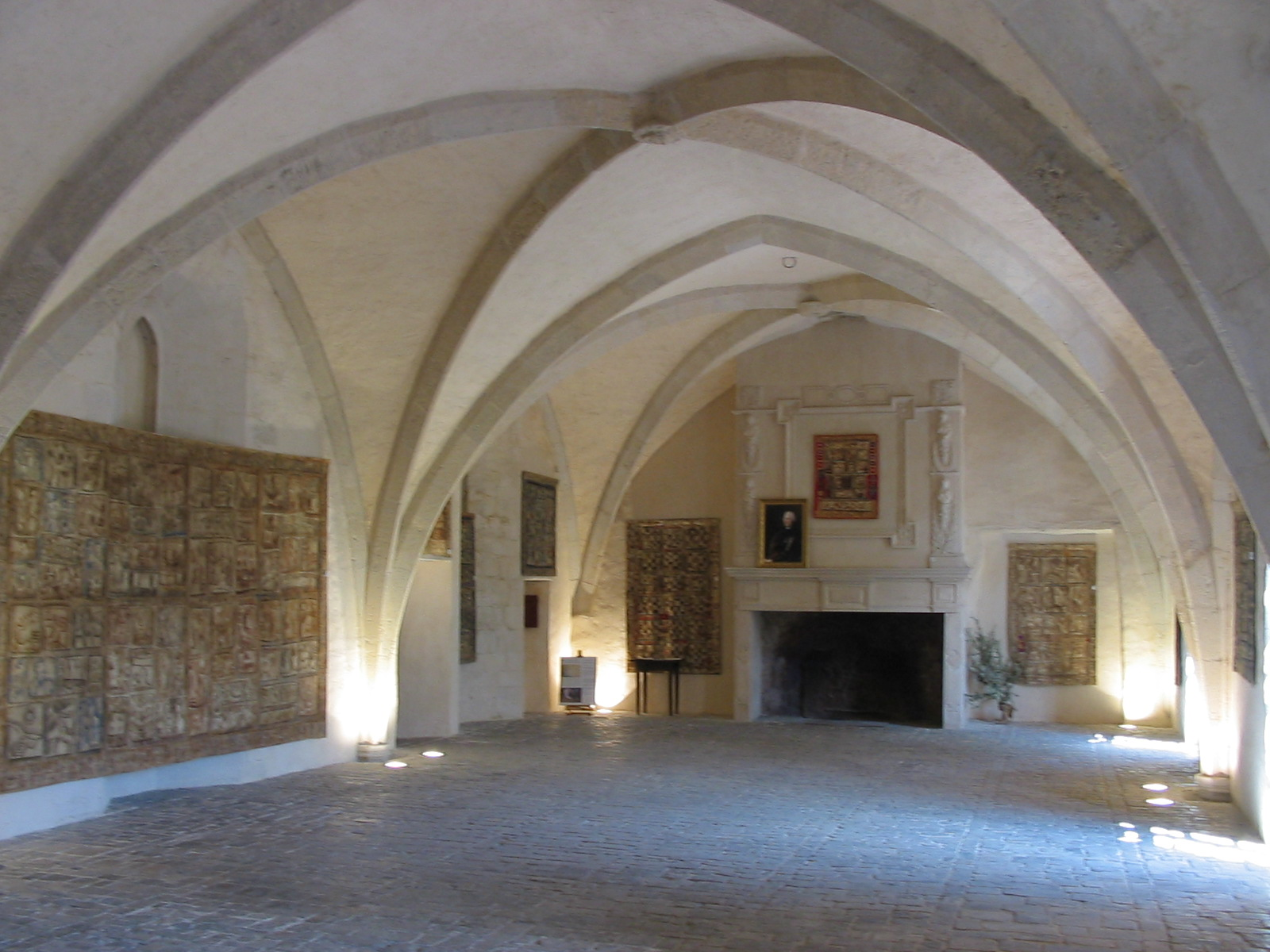
The Hall of Honour of the Commandery

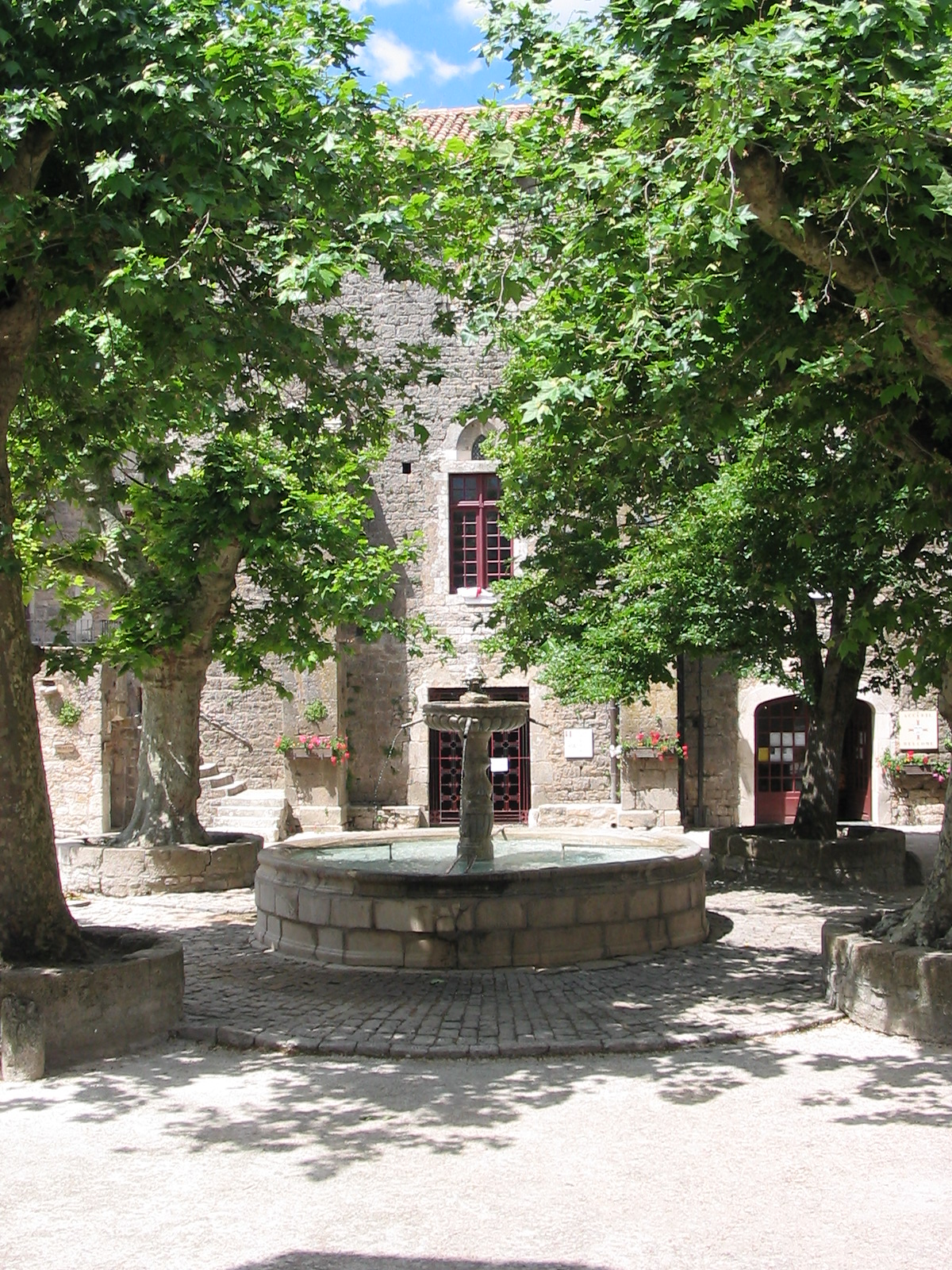
An open space within the walls

== Population ==
Historical population
Year	Pop.	±% p.a.
1968	248	—
1975	253	+0.29%
1982	230	−1.35%
1990	219	−0.61%
1999	221	+0.10%
2007	243	+1.19%
2012	262	+1.52%
2017	286	+1.77%
2023	325	+2.15%
Source: INSEE

== See also ==
- Communes of the Aveyron department
