= List of castles in France =

This is a list of castles in France, arranged by region and department.

Notes

1. The French word château has a wider meaning than the English castle: it includes architectural entities that are properly called palaces, mansions or vineyards in English. This list focuses primarily on architectural entities that may be properly termed castle or fortress (French: château-fort), and excludes entities not built around a substantial older castle that is still evident.
2. Occasionally, where there is not a specific article on a castle, links are given to another article that includes details, typically an article on a town.
3. Italics indicate links to articles in the French Wikipedia.
4. If no article appears in either English or French Wikipedias, a link is given to an external website.
5. The number in parentheses after the name of each department indicates the department number used for administrative purposes.
6. The number of castles in France is estimated to be about 45,000, a bit more than 1 for France's 36,000 communities.

== Grand Est ==
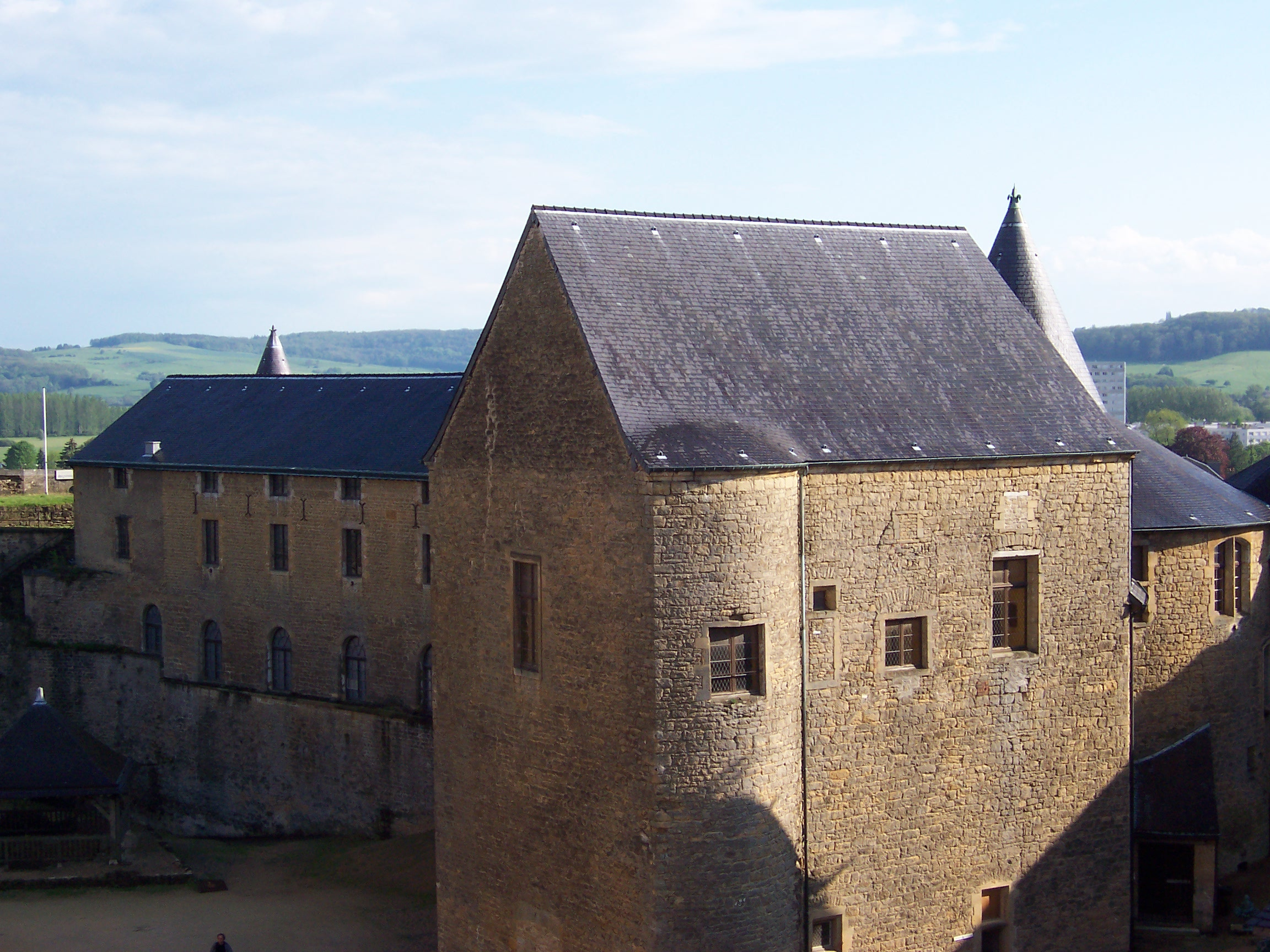
Château de Sedan

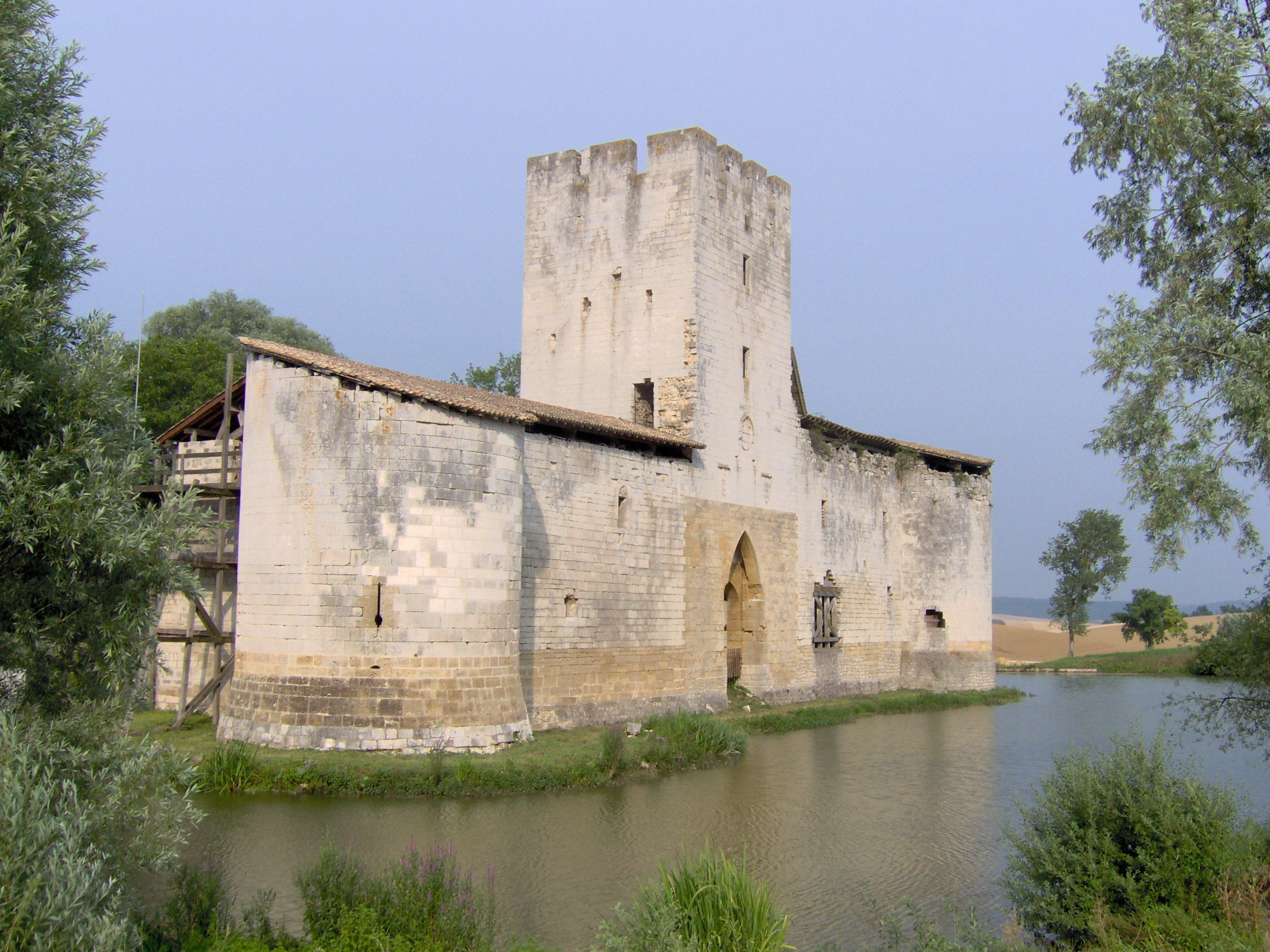
Château de Gombervaux

Ardennes (08)

Donjon de Day • Doumely • Hierges • Lamecourt • Landreville • L'Échelle • Lumes • Montcornet • Neufmanil • Remilly-les-Pothées • Rocan • Sedan • Tassigny

Aube (10)

Arrentières • Bar sur Seine • Bucey-en-Othe • Chacenay • Droupt-Saint-Basle • Jaucourt (chapel) • Ricey-Bas • Saint-Lyé (Evêques de Troyes) • Vanlay • Vendeuvre-sur-Barse

Haute-Marne (52)

Lafauche • Vignory

Marne (51)

Lagery • Montmort • Troissy • Vienne-le-Château

Meurthe-et-Moselle (54)

Bainville-aux-Miroirs • Blamont • Cons-la-Grandville • Dieulouard • Jaulny • Longwy • Mousson • Moyen • Nomeny • Pierrefort • Pierre-Percée • Prény • Vaudémont

Meuse (55)

Gombervaux • Hattonchâtel

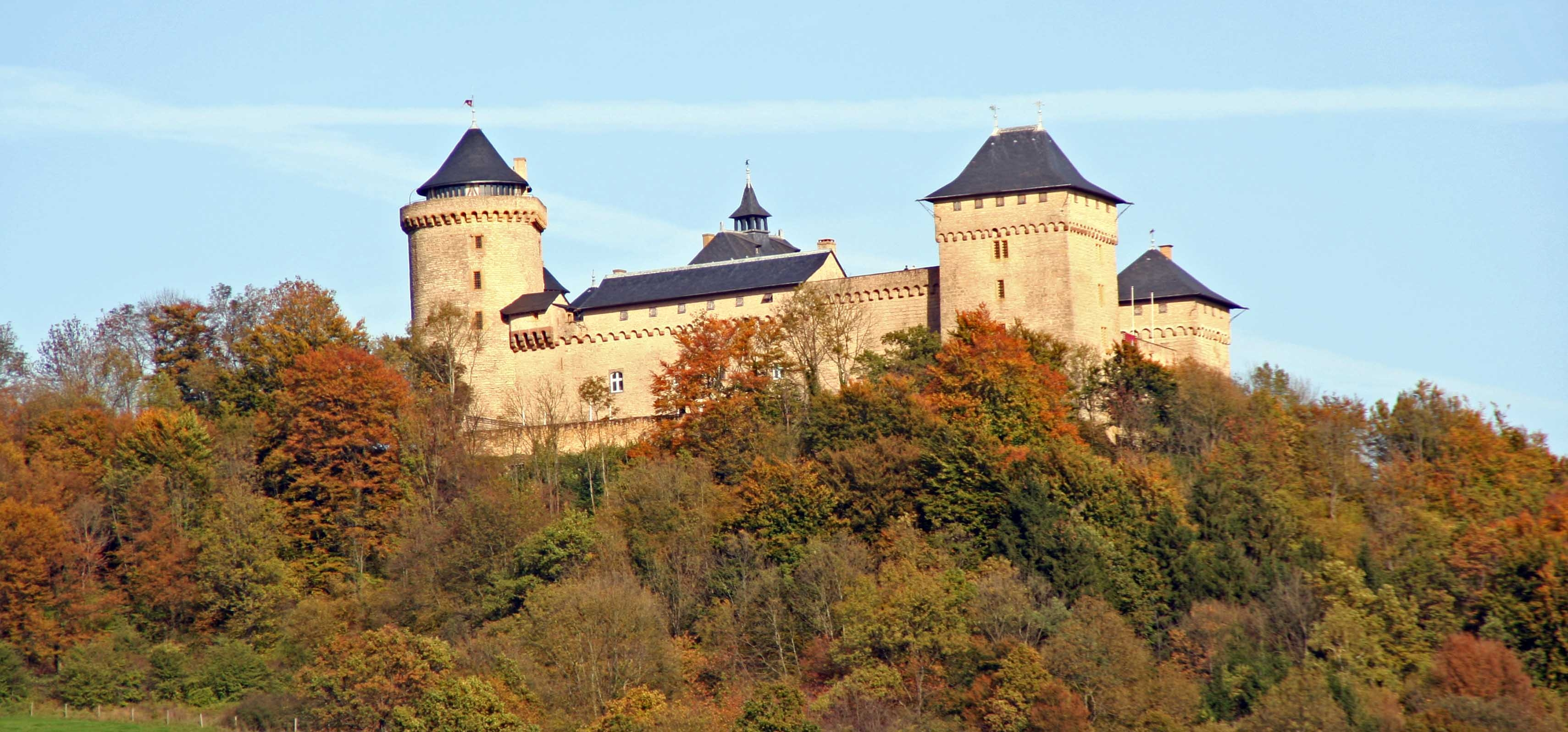
Château de Malbrouck

Moselle (57)

Alteville • Ancerville • Bitche • Blettange • Buy • Comtes de Luxembourg • Créhange • Dabo • Ducs de Lorraine (Sierck) • Falkenstein • Fénétrange • Frauenberg • Gendersberg • Geroldseck • Grand-Arnsbourg • Helfedange • Helfenstein • Hingsange • Hombourg-Budange • Hombourg-Haut • Lorraine • Luttange • Lutzelbourg • Malbrouck • Marimont • Mouterhouse • Ottange • Philippsfels • Ramstein • Rodemack • Rothenbourg • Roussy-Seigneurie • Saint-Sixte • Sarrebourg • Schlossberg • Turquestein • Vry • Waldeck • Warsberg • Weckerburg • Weidesheim • Woippy • Xouaxange

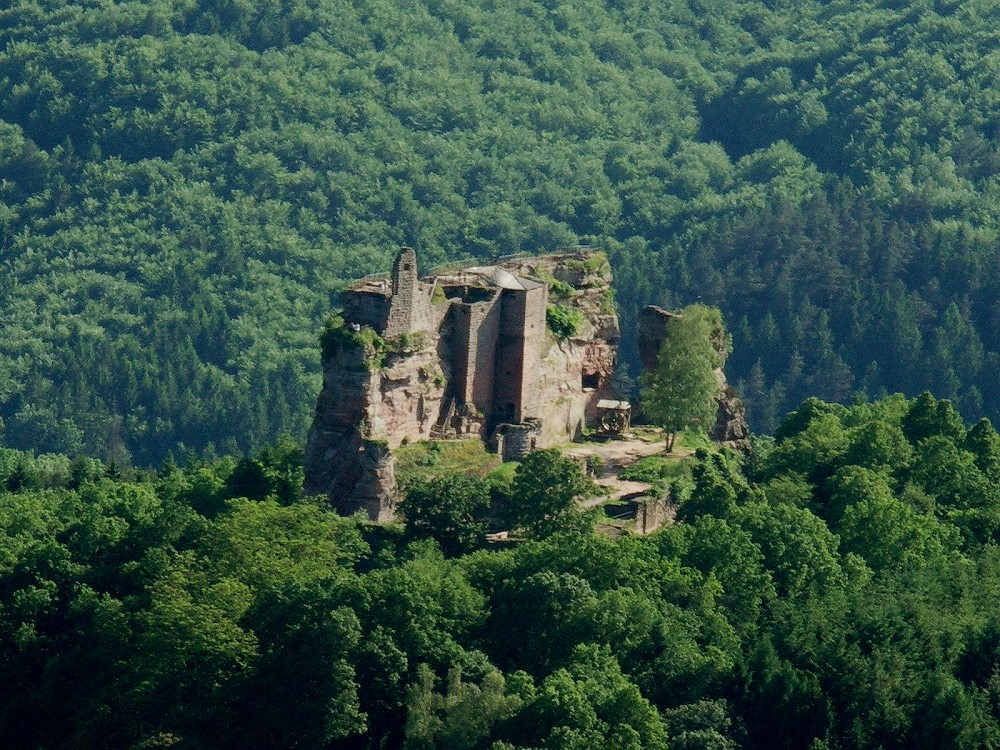
Château de Fleckenstein

Bas-Rhin (67)

Andlau • Bernstein • Birkenfels • Châtenois • Dreistein • Fleckenstein • Frankenbourg • Freudeneck • Frœnsbourg • Grand-Geroldseck • Greifenstein • Guirbaden • Hagelschloss • Haut-Barr or Hohbarr • Haut-Kœnigsbourg • Herrenstein • Hohenbourg • Hohenfels • Hohenstein • des Ifs • Kagenfels • Kintzheim • Landsberg • Lichtenberg • Lœwenstein • Lutzelbourg • Lutzelhardt • Nideck • Nouveau-Windstein • Oberhof • Ochsenstein • Osthoffen • l'Ortenbourg • Ottrott • Petit-Arnsberg • Petite-Pierre • Petit-Geroldseck • Ramstein • Ringelstein (Grand) • Ringelstein (Petit) • la Roche • Rohan (Mutzig) • Saint-Rémy d'Altenstadt • Salm • Schœneck • Spesbourg • Vieux-Windstein • Wangen • Wangenbourg • Wasenbourg • Wasigenstein • Wineck • Wittschloessel

Haut-Rhin (68)

Altkirch • Aspach-le-Haut • Bilstein • Burgstall • Buchenek • Butenheim • Dagsbourg • Echery • Ferrette • Freundstein • Girsberg • Hagueneck • Hartmannswiller • Hattstatt-Schauenbourg • Haut-Ribeaupierre • Heidwiller • Hohenack • Hohlandsbourg • Hugstein • Kaysersberg • Landskron • Lupfen-Schwendi • Meywhir • Morimont • Orschwihr • Pflixbourg • Saint-Léon • Saint-Ulrich • Stoerenbourg • Wagenbourg • Weckmund • Wildenstein • Wineck

Vosges (88)

Bruyères • Châtel-sur-Moselle • Épinal • Fontenoy-le-Château • Saint-Jean-du-Marché

(→Top)

== Nouvelle-Aquitaine ==
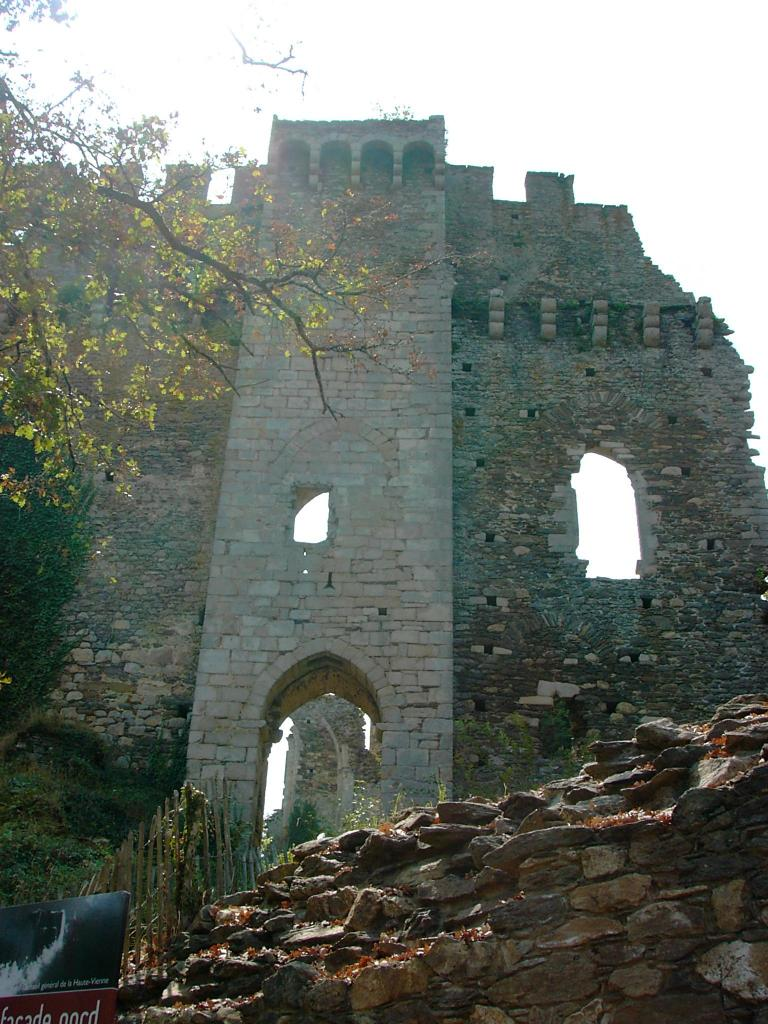
Château de Châlucet

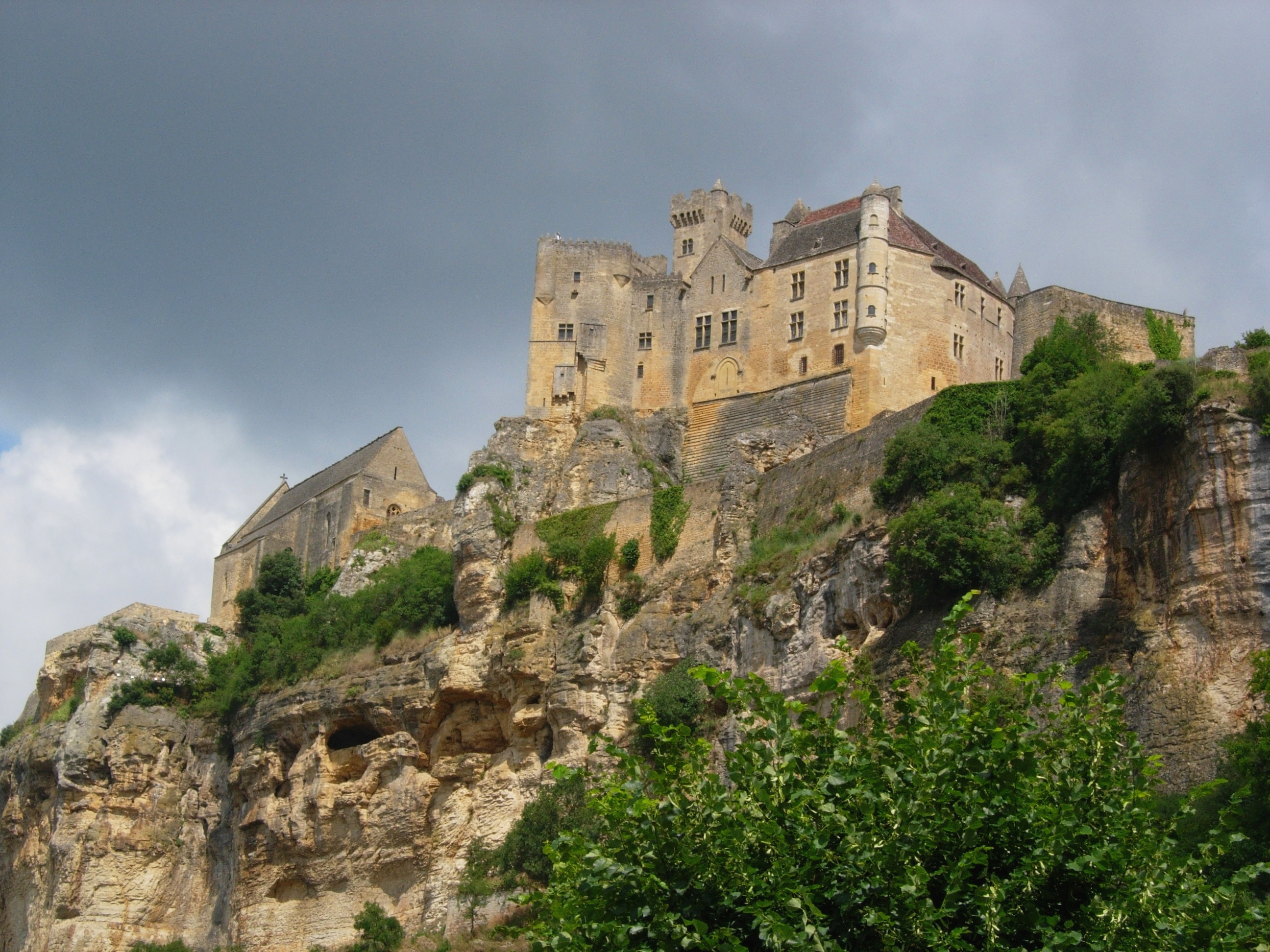
Château de Beynac

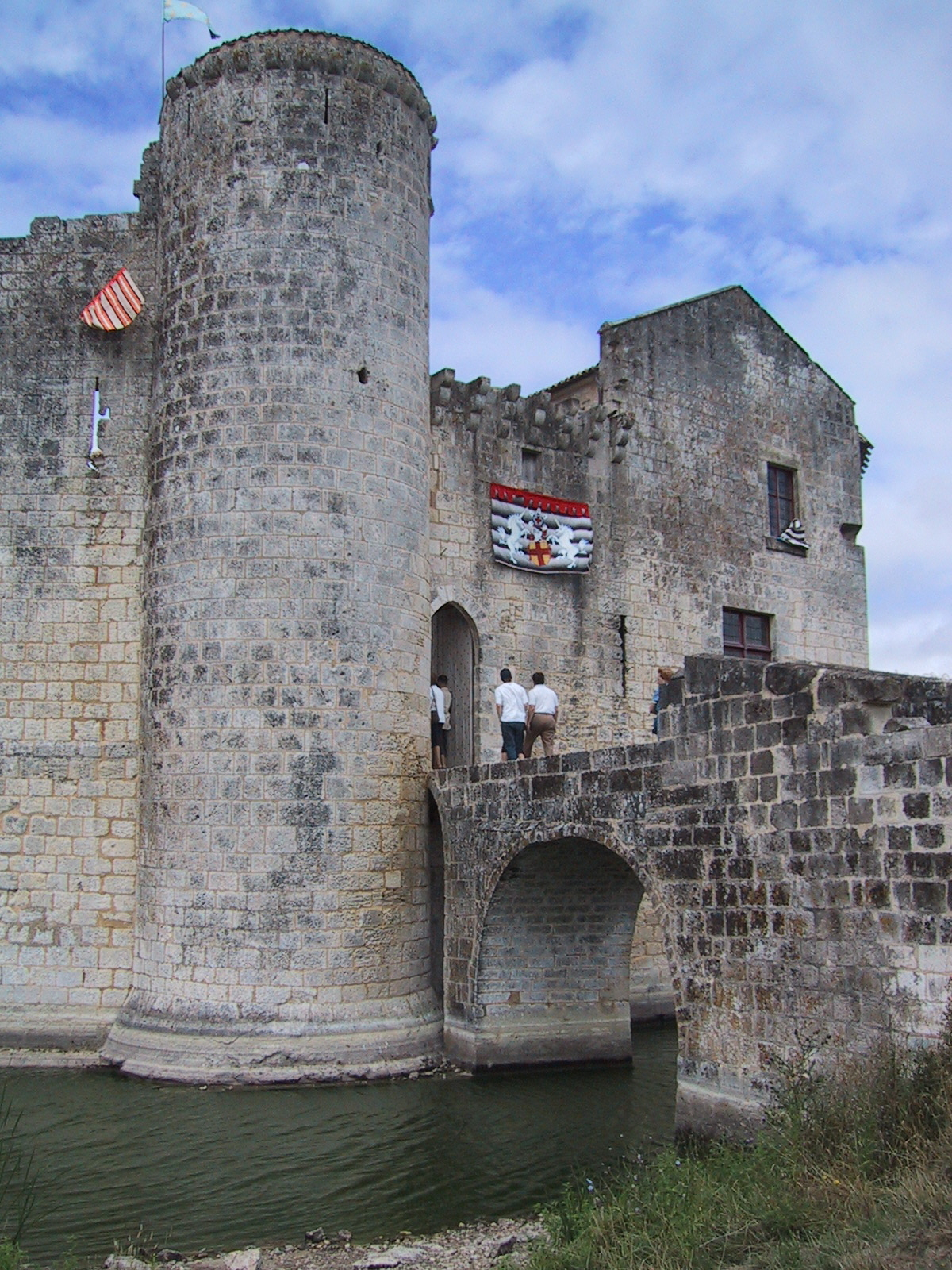
Le Château de Saint-Jean-d'Angle

Charente (16)

Angoulême • Baneuil • Barbezieux • Bayers • Bouteville • Brigueuil • Chillac • Cognac • Confolens • Gourville • Jarnac • Marthon • Montbron • Montignac-Charente • L'Oisellerie • Richemont • Rochebrune • La Rochefoucauld • Verteuil • Villebois-Lavalette

Charente-Maritime (17)

Aulnay • Broue • Fouras • l'Isleau • Montendre • Montguyon • Nieul-lès-Saintes • Pons • Rioux • La Rochecourbon • Saint-Jean-d'Angle • Saint-Sauvant • Taillebourg • Vauclair • Villeneuve-la-Comtesse

Corrèze (19)

la Johannie • Merle • Plas • Saint-Hilaire • Turenne • Ventadour

Creuse (23)

Clairavaux (Puyravaux) • Crozant • Saint-Germain-Beaupré

Deux-Sèvres (79)

Airvault • Bressuire • La Chapelle-Bertrand • Cherveux • Coudray-Salbart • la Guyonnière • Javarzay • Mursay • Niort • Olbreuse • Parthenay • Sanzay • Saint-Mesmin

Dordogne (24)

Agonac • Auberoche • Aucors • Bayac • Bellegarde • Beynac • Biron • Bourdeilles • Bridoire • Brieudet • Bruzac • Castelnaud-la-Chapelle • Chaban • La Chapelle-Faucher • Clérans • Commarque • Condat • Excideuil • Eymet • Faye (Auriac-du-Périgord) • Frugie • Gageac • la Grande Filolie • l'Herm • la Jarthe • Losse • Jumilhac • Lalinde • Lanmary • Lieu-Dieu • Mareuil • Mavaleix • Milandes • Montaigne • Montcigoux • Montfort • Montréal • Puymartin • Rognac • Saint-Germain • Sainte-Alvère • Salignac • Sauvebœuf (Aubas) • Tayac • Vaucocour • Vieillecour

Gironde (33)

Blanquefort • la Brède • Budos • Cazeneuve • Curton • Faugas • de Francs • Guilleragues • Hâ (Bordeaux) • Hamel • Lagorce • Langoiran • Lavison • Lormont • Quat'Sos (La Réole) • Rauzan • Roquetaillade • Tardes • la Trave • Villandraut

Haute-Vienne (87)

Châlucet • Châlus-Chabrol • Château-Chervix • Bonneval • Lastours • Montbrun • Rochechouart

Landes (40)

Caumale • Labrit • Lacataye • Montbron • Montréal (Peyrehorade) • Nolibos

Lot-et-Garonne (47)

Barbaste • Beauville • Bonaguil • Buzet • Cuzorn • Duras • Le Fréchou • Gavaudun • Lagrange-Monrepos • Madaillan • Montluc • Nérac • Sauveterre (Château des Rois ducs) • Xaintrailles

Pyrénées-Atlantiques (64)

Bellocq • Belzunce • Bidache • Château-vieux • Labastide-Villefranche • Mauléon • Moncade • Montaner • Morlanne • Pau • Ruthie

Vienne (86)

Angles-sur-l'Anglin • la Bonnetière • Chambonneau • Cujalais • Dissay • le Fou • Gençay • Lusignan • Masseuil • la Mothe-Chandeniers • Ranton • Saint-Cassien • Ternay • Touffou

(→Top)

== Auvergne-Rhône-Alpes ==
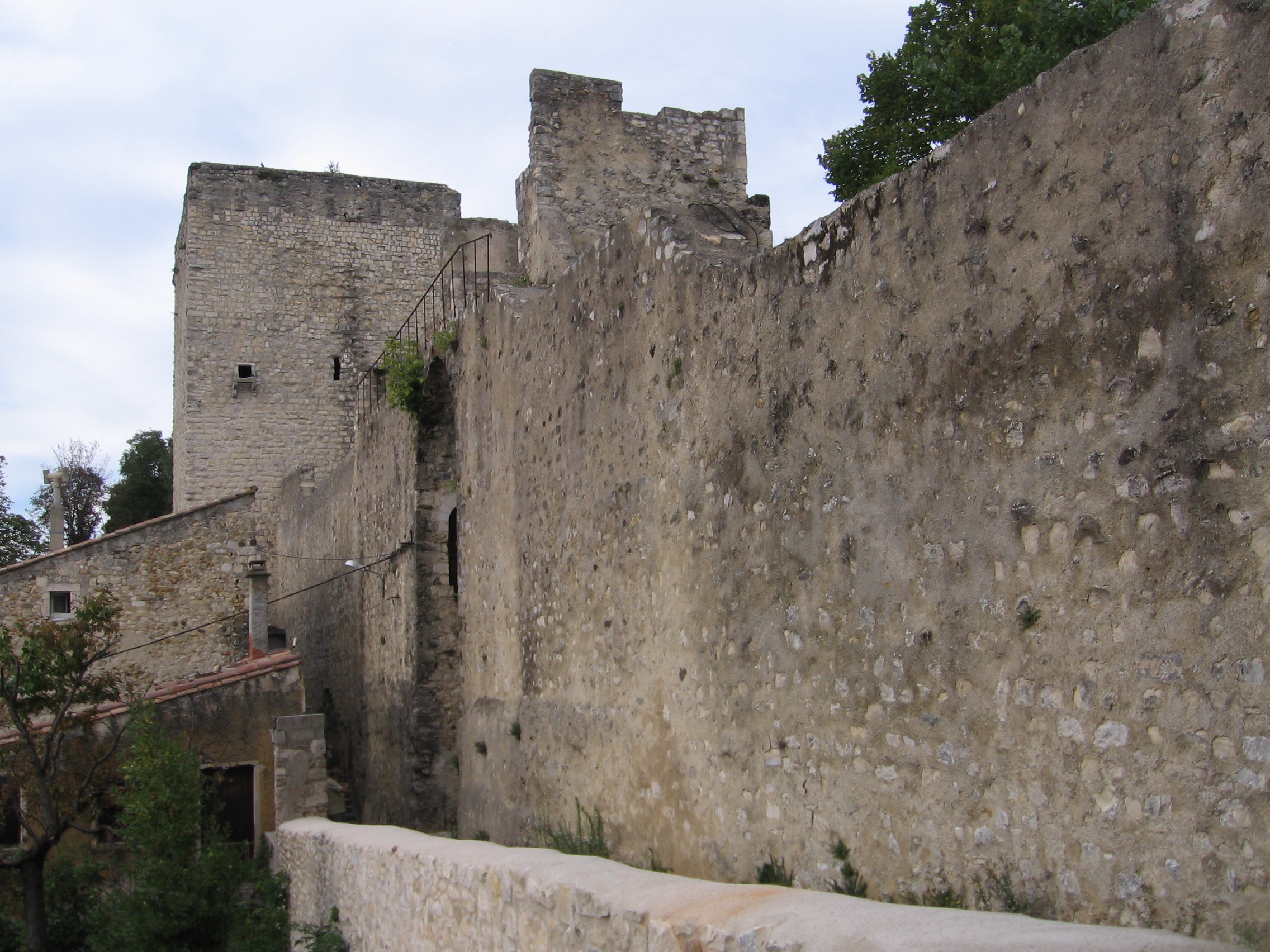
Château des Adhémar

Ain (01)

des Allymes • Barre • la Bâtie • Châtillon-sur-Chalaronne • Cordon • Fort l'Écluse • Montribloud • Poncin • Trévoux

Allier (03)

Billy • Busset • Chouvigny • Gannat • la Lande • Montgilbert • la Palice • Thoury

Ardèche (07)

Aubenas (or Montlaur) • Boulogne • Chambonas • Crussol • Largentière • la Tourette • Maisonseule • des Moines • Tournon • Vaussèche • Ventadour • Vogüé

Cantal (15)

Alleuze • Anjony • Branzac • Carbonat • Celles • Conros • Couffour • Crèvecœur • Pesteils • Réquistat • Val • Vieillevie • Vixouze

Drôme (26)

Adhémar • Albon • Allan • Chabrillan • Chamaret • Crest • Grâne • Grignan • Ratières • Rochechinard • Rochefort-en-Valdaine • Suze-la-Rousse

Haute-Loire (43)

Allègre • Arlempdes • Artias • Auzon • Beaufort • Bosbomparent • Chalencon • Chavaniac • Domeyrat • Polignac • Rochebaron • Saint-Ilpize • Saint Romain (at Siaugues-Sainte-Marie)

Haute-Savoie (74)

Allinges (neuf) • Allinges (vieux) • Annecy • Beauregard • Bonneville • Crête • Dingy • Faucigny • Langin • Larringes • Menthon-Saint-Bernard • Montrottier • Ripaille • La Roche-sur-Foron • Sales • Sallenôves • Thorens

Isère (38)

Alba • Arthaudière • Bayard (Pontcharra) • Bouquéron • Clermont • Fallavier • Fayet • Septème • La Sône • Virieu

Loire (42)

Barollière • Beauregard • Chalmazel • Couzan • Essalois • Grangent • Montrond • Rapetour • La Roche • Rochetaillée • Trolanderie • Virieu

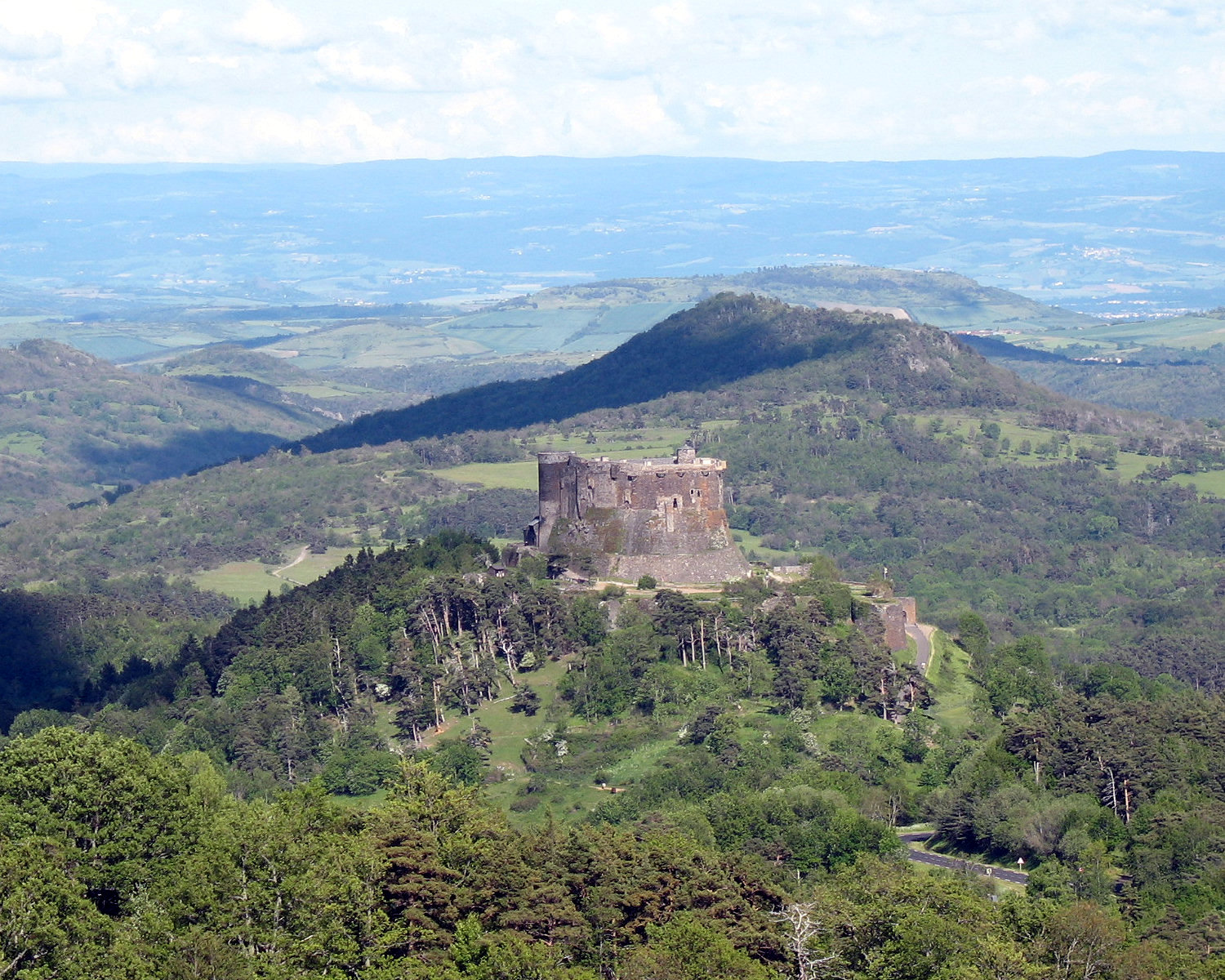
Château de Murol

Puy-de-Dôme (63)

Aulteribe • Bostfranchet • Château-Dauphin • Chazeron • Cordès • Grange Fort • Montpensier • Murol • Opme • Randan • Ravel • Rocher • Tournoël • Viverols • Vollore

Rhône (69)

Bagnols • Chamelet • Chances • Châtillon-d'Azergues • Chazay • Corcelles-en-Beaujolais • Francheville • Irigny • Jarnioux • Joux • Lissieu • Montmelas • Oingt • Pusignan • Saint-Cyr • Sou • Ternand

Savoie (73)

La Bâtie-Seyssel • Beaufort • Bourdeau • Briançon • Chantemerle • Charbonnières • Châtillon • Chevron • Cornillon • ducs de Savoie (Chambery) • La Forest • Les Marches • Miolans • Montcharvin • Saint-Michel-de-Maurienne • La Salle • Thomas II • Tournon

(→Top)

== Brittany ==
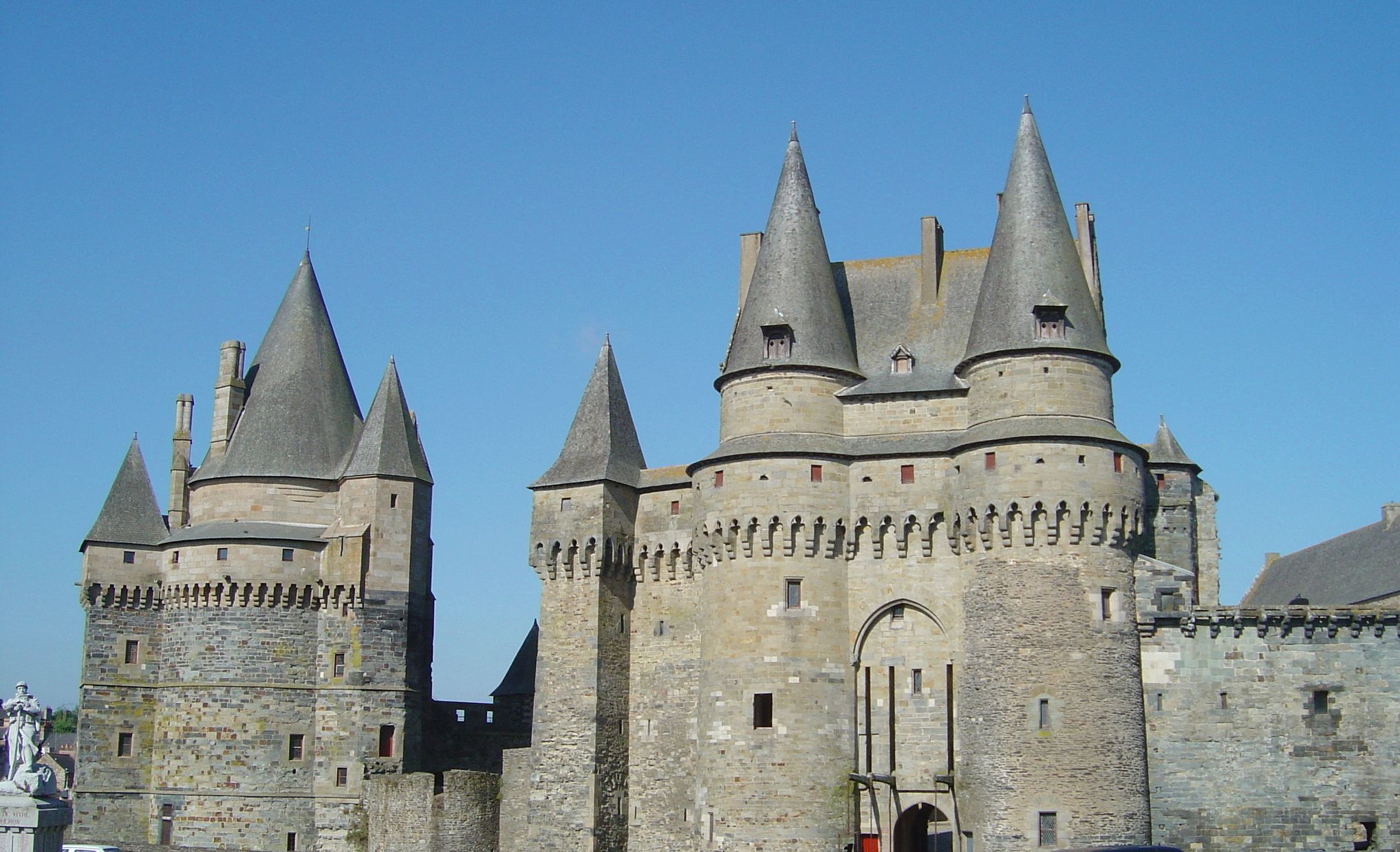
Château de Vitré

Côtes-d'Armor (22)

Dinan • Fort-la-Latte • Le Guildo • La Hunaudaye • Montafilan • Pierre II (Guingamp) • La Roche-Jagu • Tonquédec

Finistère (29)

Bertheaume • Brest • Kérouzéré • Rustéphan • Trémazan

Ille-et-Vilaine (35)

Bonnefontaine • Combourg • Fougères • Saint-Malo • Solidor Tower • Vitré

Morbihan (56)

Comper • Josselin • Largoët • Plessis-Josso • Ducs des Rohan (Pontivy) • Suscinio • Trécesson

(→Top)

== Bourgogne-Franche-Comté ==
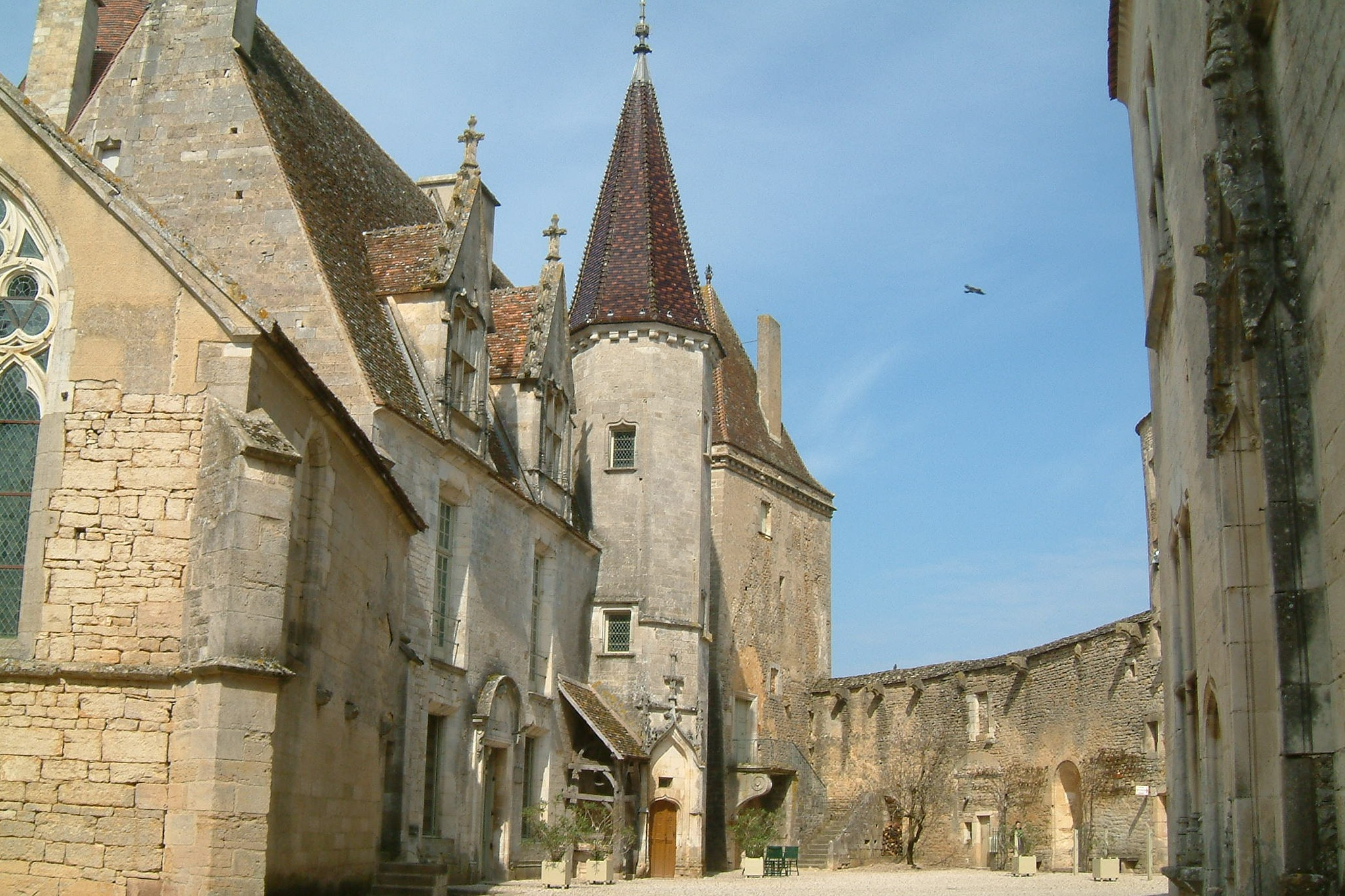
Château de Châteauneuf

Côte-d'Or (21)

Auxonne • Bussy-Rabutin • Châteauneuf • Commarin • Éguilly • Époisses • Frôlois • Gevrey-Chambertin • Mâlain • Mont-Saint-Jean • Montfort • Posanges • La Rochepot • Rosières • Savigny • Semur-en-Auxois • Thil

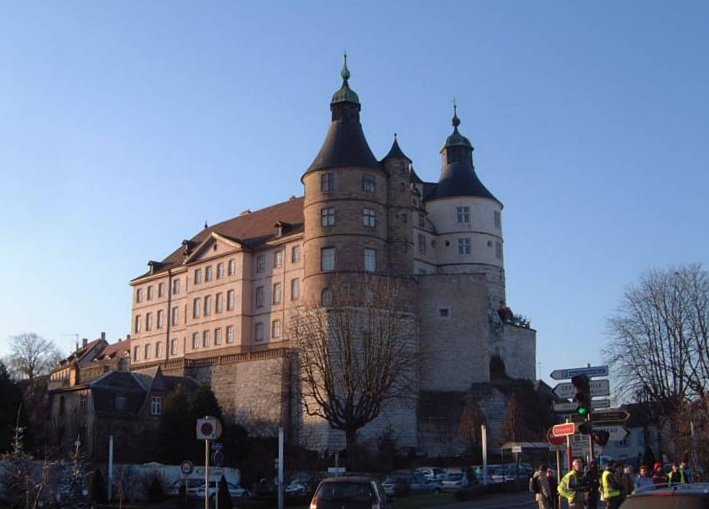
Château de Montbéliard

Doubs (25)

Belvoir • Besançon • Cléron • Fort de Joux • Montbéliard • Montfaucon

Haute-Saône (70)

Étobon • Oricourt • Ray-sur-Saône

Jura (39)

Arlay • Chevreaux • Frontenay • la Muyre • Oliferne • Pymont

Nièvre (58)

Bazoches • Chandioux • Chassy (Montreuillon) • Chevenon • Corbelin • Moulins-Engilbert • Passy-les-Tours • Villars • Villemolin

Saône-et-Loire (71)

Arcy • Balleure • Bissy-sur-Fley • Berzé • Bouttavant • Brancion • Brandon • Bresse-sur-Grosne • Champsigny • Charolles • Chassy • Châteauneuf • Chazeu • Chevannes • Commune • Corcelle • Couches • Dyo • Épinac • Igé • Igornay • Layé • Leynes • Lugny • Marcilly-la-Gueurce • Marigny (Fleurville) • Marigny • Montaigu • Montcony • Nobles • Ozenay • Le Parc • Pierreclos • Rully • Saint-Huruge • La Salle • Savigny-sur-Grosne • Semur-en-Brionnais • Sercy • Sigy-le-Châtel • La Tour du Bost • Vautheau

Territoire de Belfort (90)

Belfort • Rosemont • Rougemont

Yonne (89)

• Chastellux • Druyes • Guédélon • Jully • Noyers • Pisy • Ragny • Saint-Fargeau

(→Top)

== Centre-Val de Loire ==
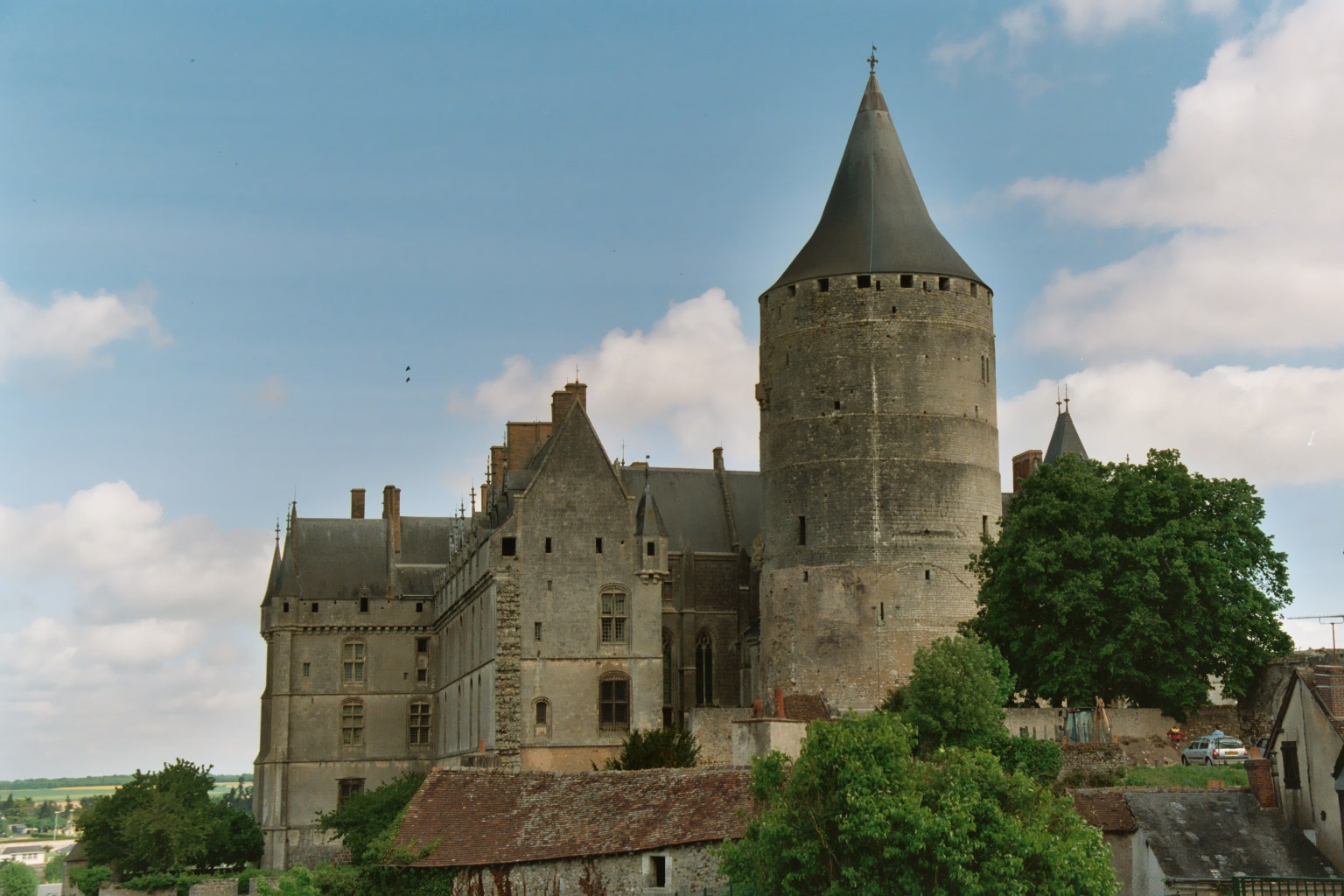
Château de Châteaudun

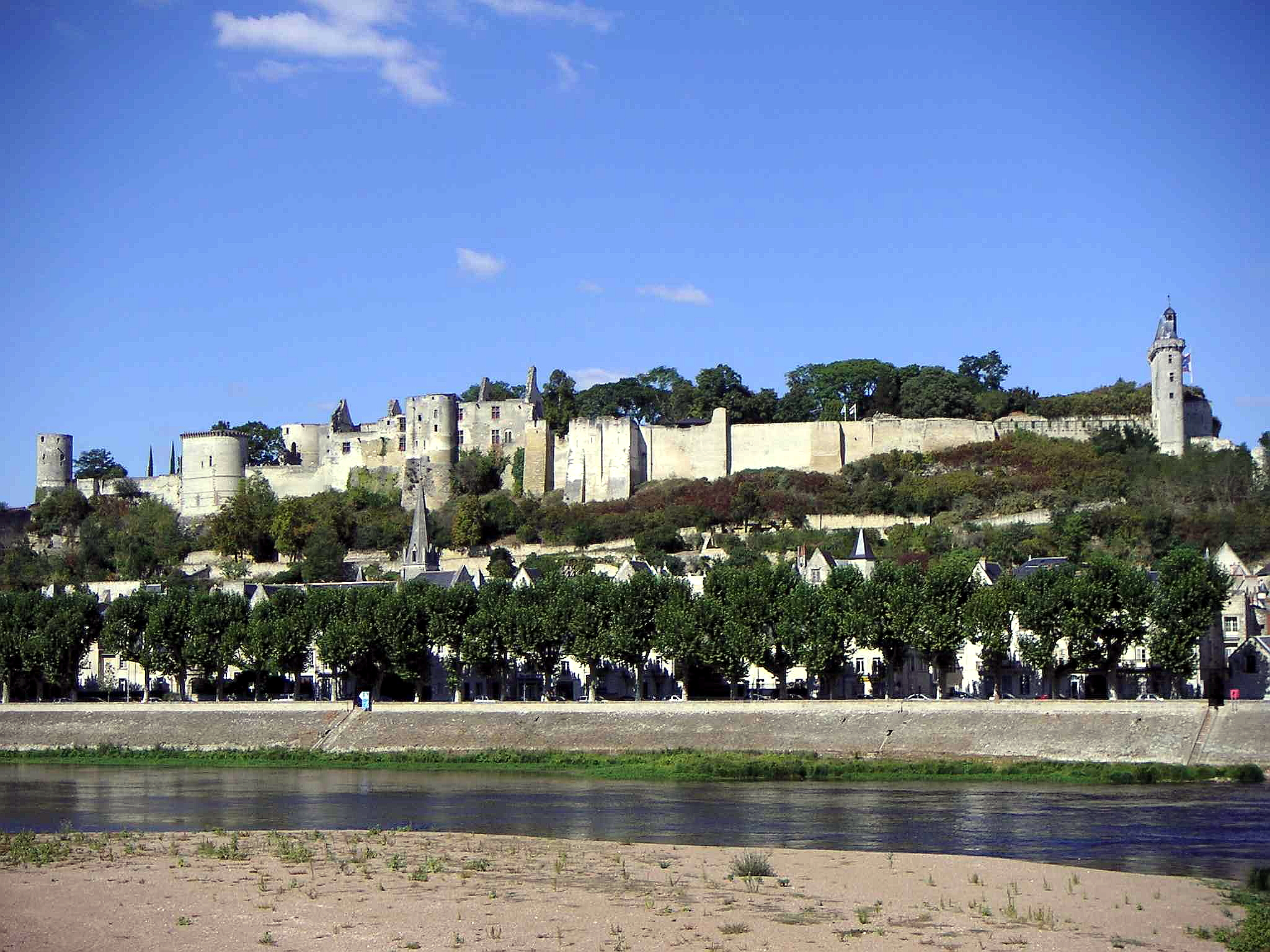
Château de Chinon

Cher (18)

Ainay-le-Vieil • Bannegon • Culan • Font-Moreau (Poul) • Grand-Besse • Jouy • Mehun-sur-Yèvre • Montrond • Pesselières • Sagonne • Sancerre

Eure-et-Loir (28)

Anet • Baronville • Châteaudun • Courtalain • Dreux • Levesville • Maintenon • Saint-Jean (Nogent-le-Rotrou)

Indre (36)

Azay-le-Ferron • Brosse • Ingrandes • Mont (le) • Sarzay • Valençay

Indre-et-Loire (37)

Amboise • Celle-Guenand • Chenonceau • Chinon • Cinq-Mars-la-Pile • Gizeux • Guerche (la) • Langeais • Loches • Luynes • Montbazon • Montpoupon • Montrésor • Le Rivau • Tours • Ussé • Vaujours

Loir-et-Cher (41)

Chaumont-sur-Loire • Fougères-sur-Bièvre • Lavardin • Matval • Montoire-sur-le-Loir • Montrichard • le Moulin • Vendôme

Loiret (45)

Beaugency • Bellegarde • Chamerolles • Châteaurenard • Châtillon-Coligny • du Hallier • Meung-sur-Loire • Sully-sur-Loire • Yèvre-le-Châtel

(→Top)

== Corsica ==
Corse-du-Sud (2A)

-

Haute-Corse (2B)

-

(→Top)

== Île-de-France ==
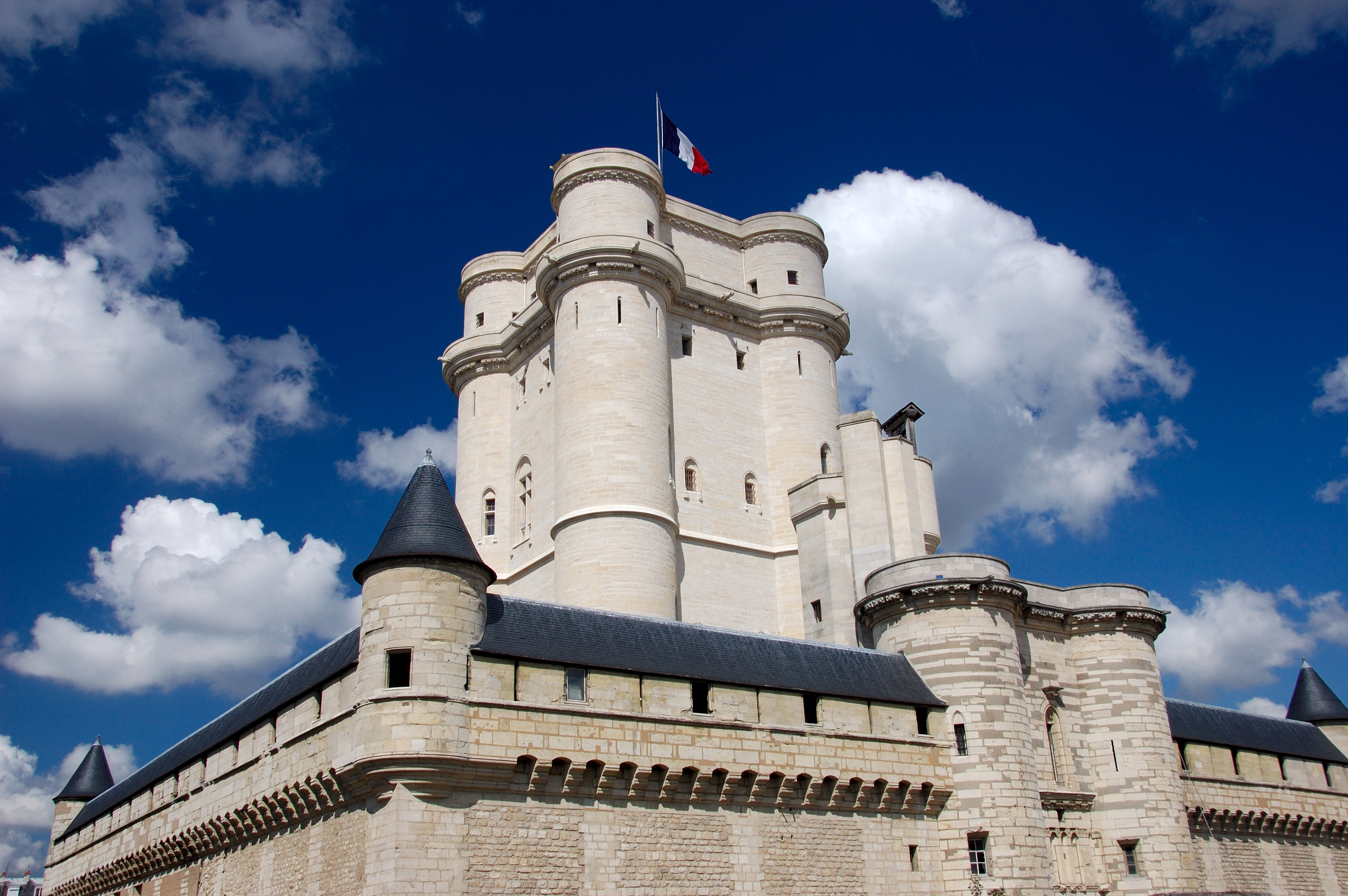
Château de Vincennes

Paris (75)

The Bastille • La Conciergerie • Le Louvre • The Temple

Seine-et-Marne (77)

Blandy-les-Tours • Brie-Comte-Robert • Diant • Épernon • la Grange-Bléneau • du Houssoy • Moret • Montaiguillon • Nangis • Nantouillet • Nemours • Tour César (Provins) • Sigy

Yvelines (78)

Beynes • Donjon de Houdan • La Madeleine (Chevreuse) • Donjon de Maurepas • Montfort • Villiers-le-Mahieu

Essonne (91)

Dourdan • Étampes • Montlhéry

Hauts-de-Seine (92)

-

Seine-Saint-Denis (93)

-

Val-de-Marne (94)

- Vincennes

Val-d'Oise (95)

Beaumont-sur-Oise • La Roche-Guyon

(→Top)

== Occitanie ==
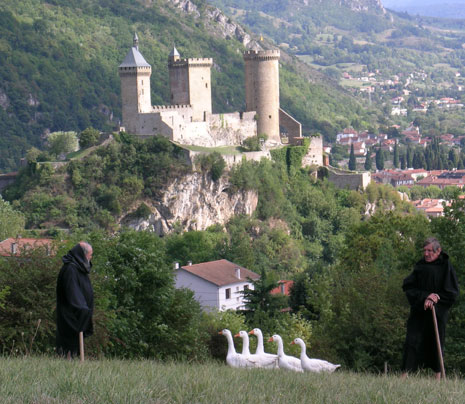
Château de Foix

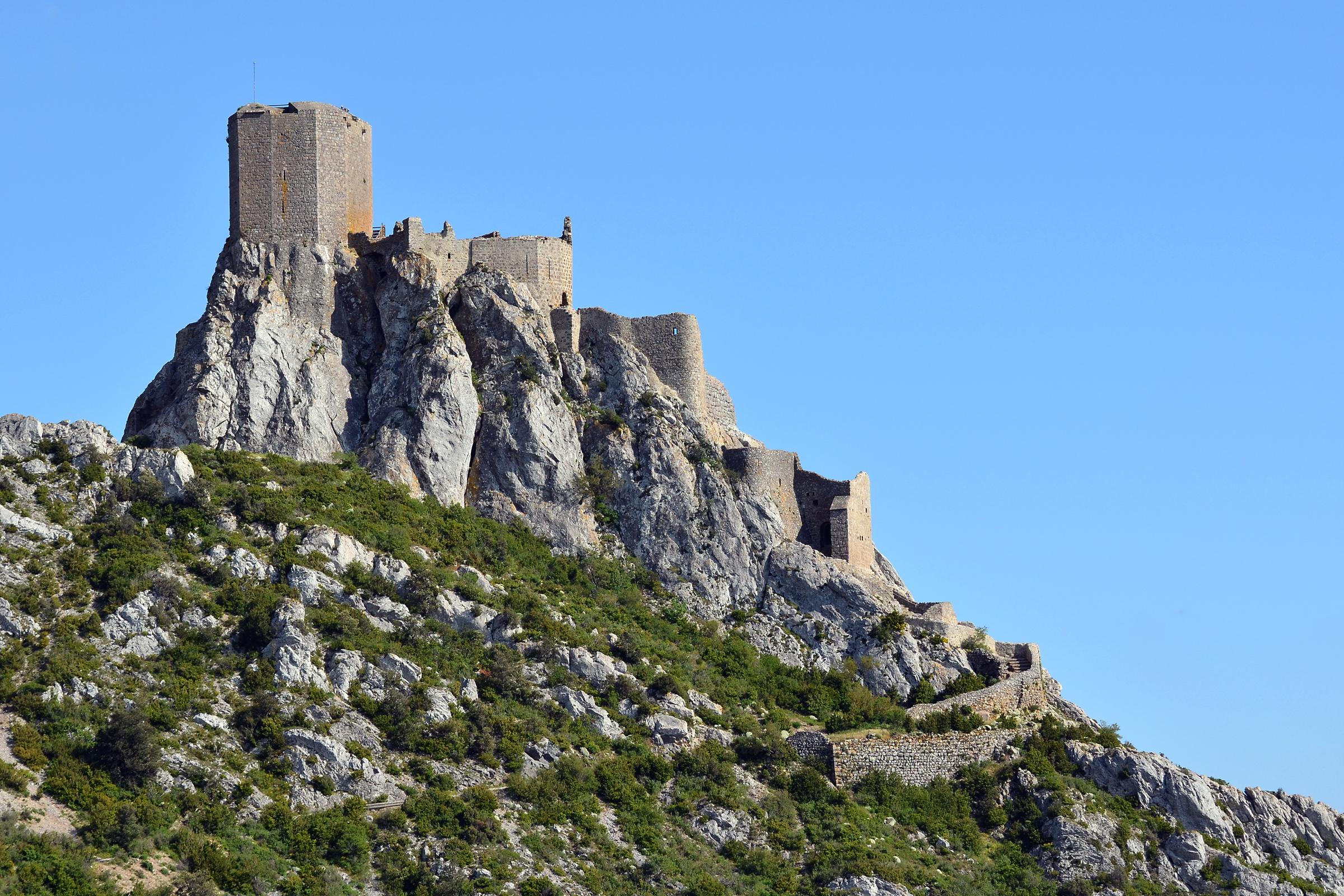
Château de Quéribus

Ariège (09)

Foix • Gudanes • Lagarde • Mirabat • Miglos • Montaillou • Montségur • Roquefixade • Seix • Usson

Aude (11)

Aguilar • Arques • Arzens • Auriac • Bézu • Tour Barberousse (Gruissan) • Carcassonne • Ducs de Joyeuse • Durban • Durfort • Gaussan • Lastours • Miramont • Niort-de-Sault • Padern • Peyrepertuse • Pieusse • Puilaurens • Puivert • Quéribus • Saint-Ferriol • Saint Martin de Toques • Saissac • Termes • Villerouge-Termenès

Aveyron (12)

Castles in Aveyron [This article includes Bourines, Colombier, Estaing, Ginals, Inférieur, Loupiac, Marinesque, Mas Rougier, Masse, Méjanel, Mélac, Montarnal, Montjaux, Mostuéjouls, Pagax, la Pèze, Recoules, Roquelaure, Salvagnac-Cajarc, Sénergues, Tholet, Toulonjac, Valon, Versols] • Balsac • Belcastel • Calmont d'Olt • Coupiac • Fayet • Inférieur • Latour-sur-Sorgues • Montaigut • Najac • Peyrelade • Pruines • Saint-Côme-d'Olt • Saint-Izaire • la Servayrie • Sévérac • Vézins

Gard (30)

Aiguèze • Allègre • Beaucaire • Brésis • Montdardier • Fort Saint-André • Portes • Rousson • Saint-Chaptes • Uzès • Vissec

Gers (32)

Castles in Gers [This article includes Avensac, Balarin, Bassoues, Beaumont, Berrac, Bivès, Cassaigne, Castelmore, Castéra-Lectourois, Castet-Arrouy, Courrensan, Epas, Esclignac, Garranée, Gimbrède, Homps, Lagardère, Larroque-Engalin, Lasserre, Leberon, L'Isle-Bouzon, Maniban, Mansencôme, Mazères, la Mothe, Mothes, Pouypardin, Pouylebon, Pouy-Roquelaure, Pujos, Sainte-Gemme, Saint-Georges, Saint-Lary, Saint-Martin-d'Armagnac, Savignac, Sempesserre, Sérillac, Tauzia] • Bouvées • Flamarens • Herrebouc • Homps • Lacassagne • Larressingle • Lasserre • Mérens • Sainte-Mère • Terraube • Thibault de Termes

Haute-Garonne (31)

Aurignac • Berthier • Boussan • Brax • Calmont • Cambiac • Castagnac • Fourquevaux • Galié • Jean • Labastide-Paumès • Laréole • Larroque • Latoue • Launac • Montespan • Pibrac • Rudelle • Saint-Béat • Saint-Élix-le-Château • Saint-Élix-Séglan • Sainte-Marie • Saint-Félix-Lauragais • Saint-Jory • Saint-Paul-d'Oueil • Salvetat-Saint-Gilles • Sarremezan • Vallègue • Vieillevigne • Villefranche

Hautes-Pyrénées (65)

Beaucens • Bordères-Louron • Comtes de Comminges • Estarvielle • Génos • Horgues • Lourdes • Mauvezin • Moulor • Sainte-Marie • Tramezaygues

Hérault (34)

Castles in Hérault [This article includes Agel, Aigues-Vives, Aspiran de Ravanès (Thézan-Lès-Béziers), Aumelas, Autignac, Bélarga, Cabrerolles, Cabrières, Castelnau-de-Guers, Creissan, Cruzy, Dio, Faugères, Fos, Grézan (Laurens), Malavieille, Margon, Marsillargues, Mazers (Fontės), Montouliers, Mourcairol, Pézènes-les-Mines, Puisserguier, Saint-Bauléry (Cébazan)] • Bélarga • Ganges • Guilhem (Clermont-l'Hérault) • Pézenas • Pézènes • Roquessels • Saint-Maurice • Valros • Vendres

Lot (46)

des Anglais (Autoire) • des Anglais (Brengues) • Béduer • du Bousquet • Cabrerets • Caïx • Calamane • Capdenac • Castelnau-Bretenoux • Castelnau-Montratier • Cénevières • Charry • Clermont • Condat • de La Coste • Couanac • des Doyens • Geniez • la Grézette • Grugnac • Les Junies • Labastide • Lacapelle-Marival • Lacoste • Larnagol • Larroque-Toirac • Lastours • Luzech • Masclat • Mayrac • Mercuès • Montbrun • Montcléra • Nadaillac-de-Rouge • la Pannonie • Pechrigal • Pestillac • Puy-Launay • Rocamadour • Saignes • Saint-Laurent-les-Tours • Saint-Sulpice • Saint-Thamar • Théron • Vaillac

Lozère (48)

Apcher • le Boy • Calberte • la Caze • le Champ • Florac • Grèzes • Luc • Miral • Montjézieu • Saint-Alban • Saint-Julien-d'Arpaon • Saint-Saturnin • le Tournel

Pyrénées-Orientales (66)

Belpuig • Castelnou • Château Royal de Collioure • Château Vicomtal Saint-Pierre de Fenouillet • Palais des Rois de Majorque • Fort de Salses • Ultrère

Tarn (81)

Castelnau-de-Lévis • Montespieu • Padiès

Tarn-et-Garonne (82)

Bruniquel

(→Top)

== Hauts-de-France ==
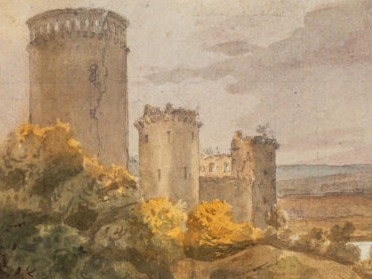
Château de Coucy, watercolor

Aisne (02)

Château-Thierry • Coucy • Fère-en-Tardenois • La Ferté-Milon • Guise • Septmonts

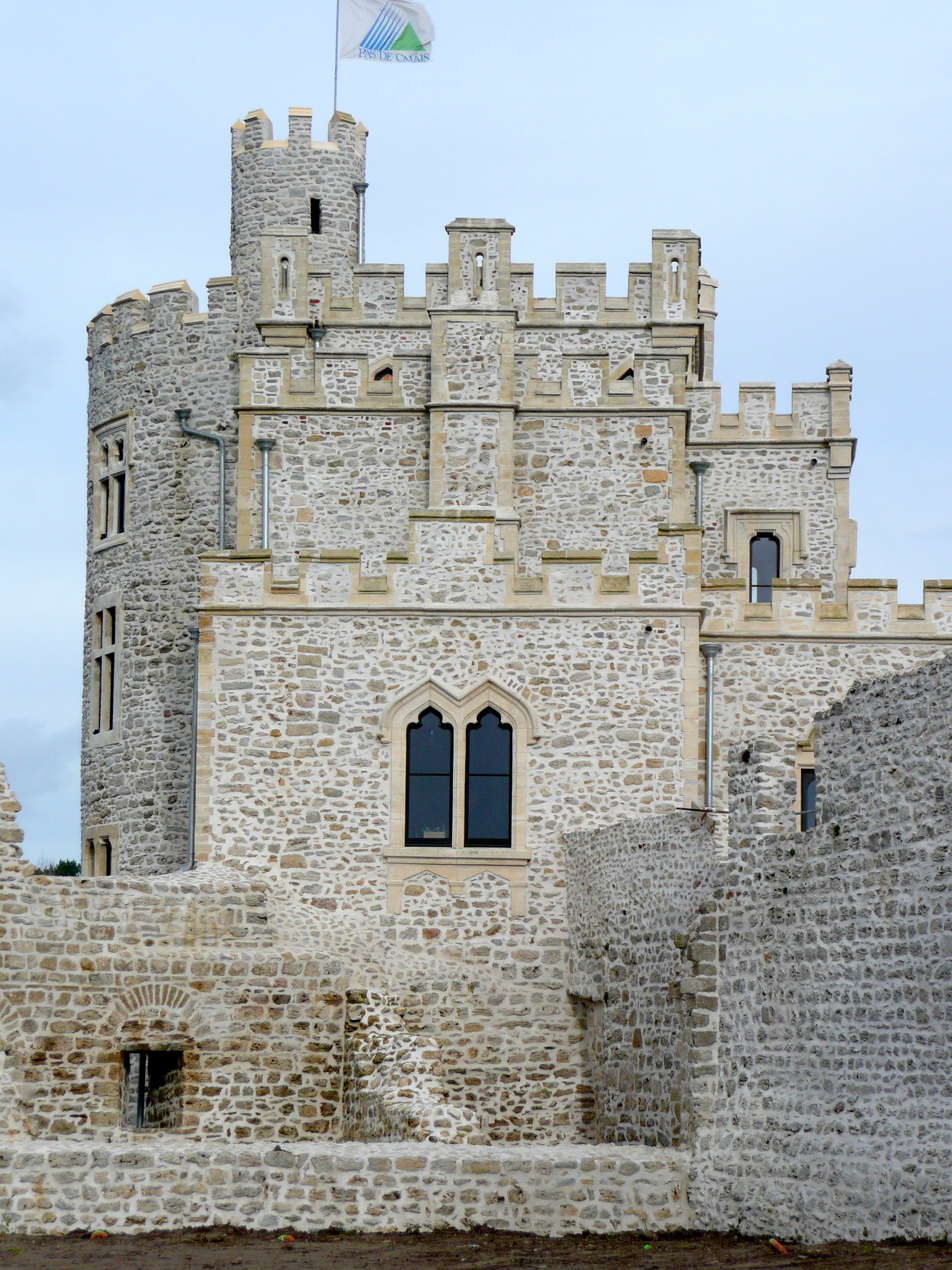
Château d'Hardelot

Nord (59)

Montmorency • Nicolas d'Avesnes

Oise (60)

Pierrefonds • Montataire

Pas-de-Calais (62)

Bailleulmont • Boulogne • Fort Risban (Calais) • Citadel of Calais • Hardelot • Olhain

Somme (80)

Boves • Eaucourt-sur-Somme • Folleville • Ham • Péronne • Picquigny • Rambures

(→Top)

== Normandy ==
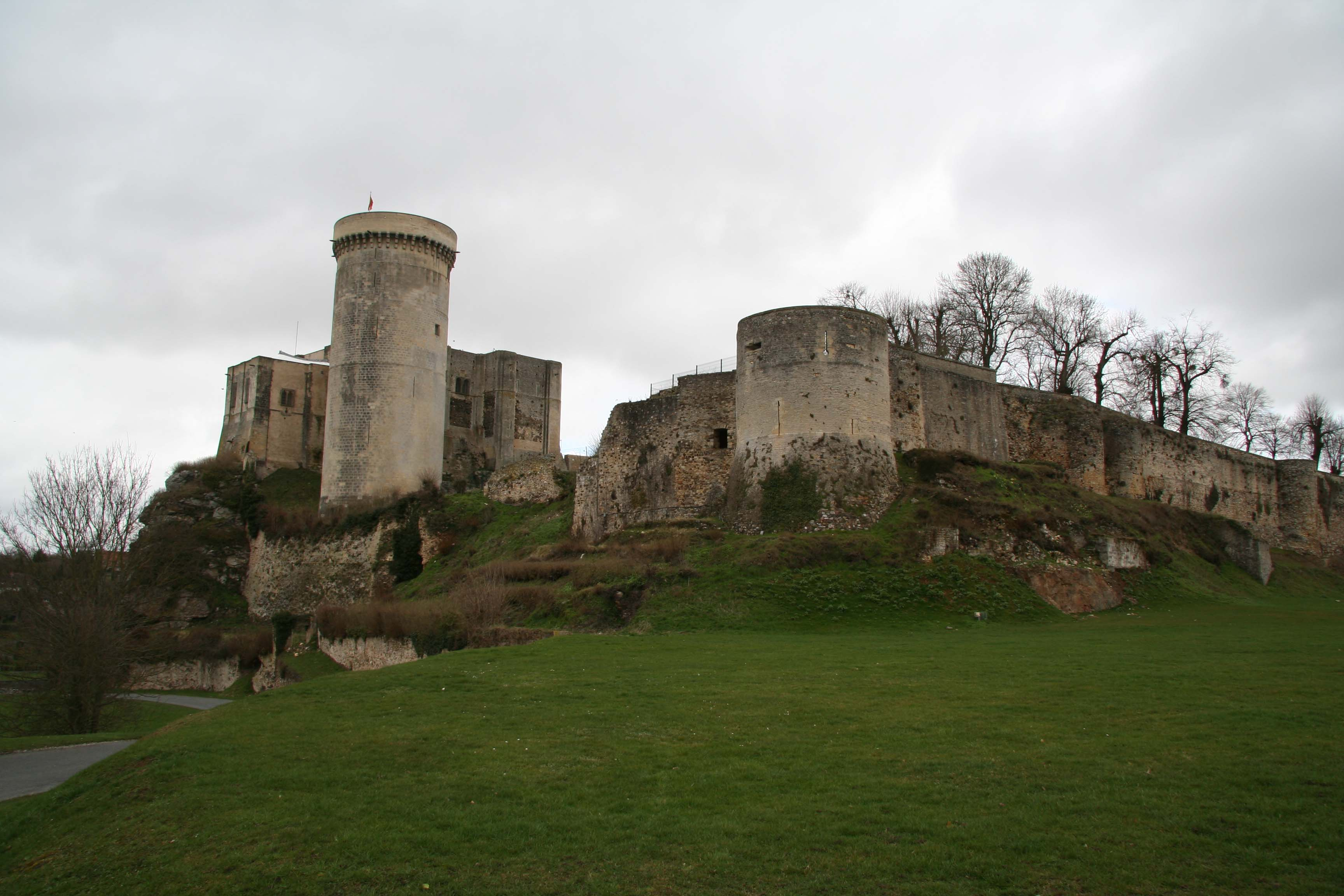
Château de Falaise

Calvados (14)

Beaumont-le-Richard • Caen • Colombières • Courcy • Creully • Falaise • Olivet • Sassy • Vire

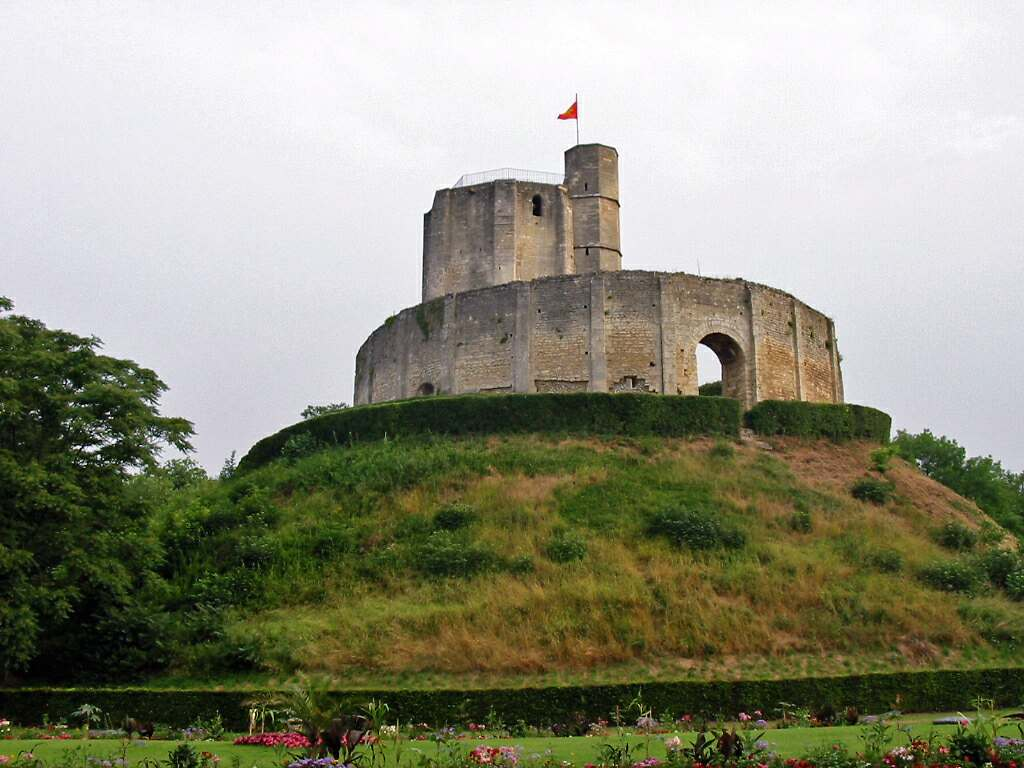
Château de Gisors

Eure (27)

Château Gaillard • Château-sur-Epte • Conches-en-Ouche • Gisors • Harcourt • Ivry-la-Bataille • Fort de Limaie • Lyons-la-Forêt • Les Tourelles • Vernon (Archives)

Manche (50)

Bricquebec • Canisy • Gratot • Pirou • Regnéville • Saint-Sauveur-le-Vicomte

Orne (61)

Carrouges • Domfront • Ducs d'Alençon • Château de la Motte, Joué du Plain

Seine-Maritime (76)

Arques-la-Bataille • Dieppe • Ételan • Fécamp • Lillebonne • Orcher • Robert le Diable • Rouen • Tancarville

(→Top)

== Pays de la Loire ==
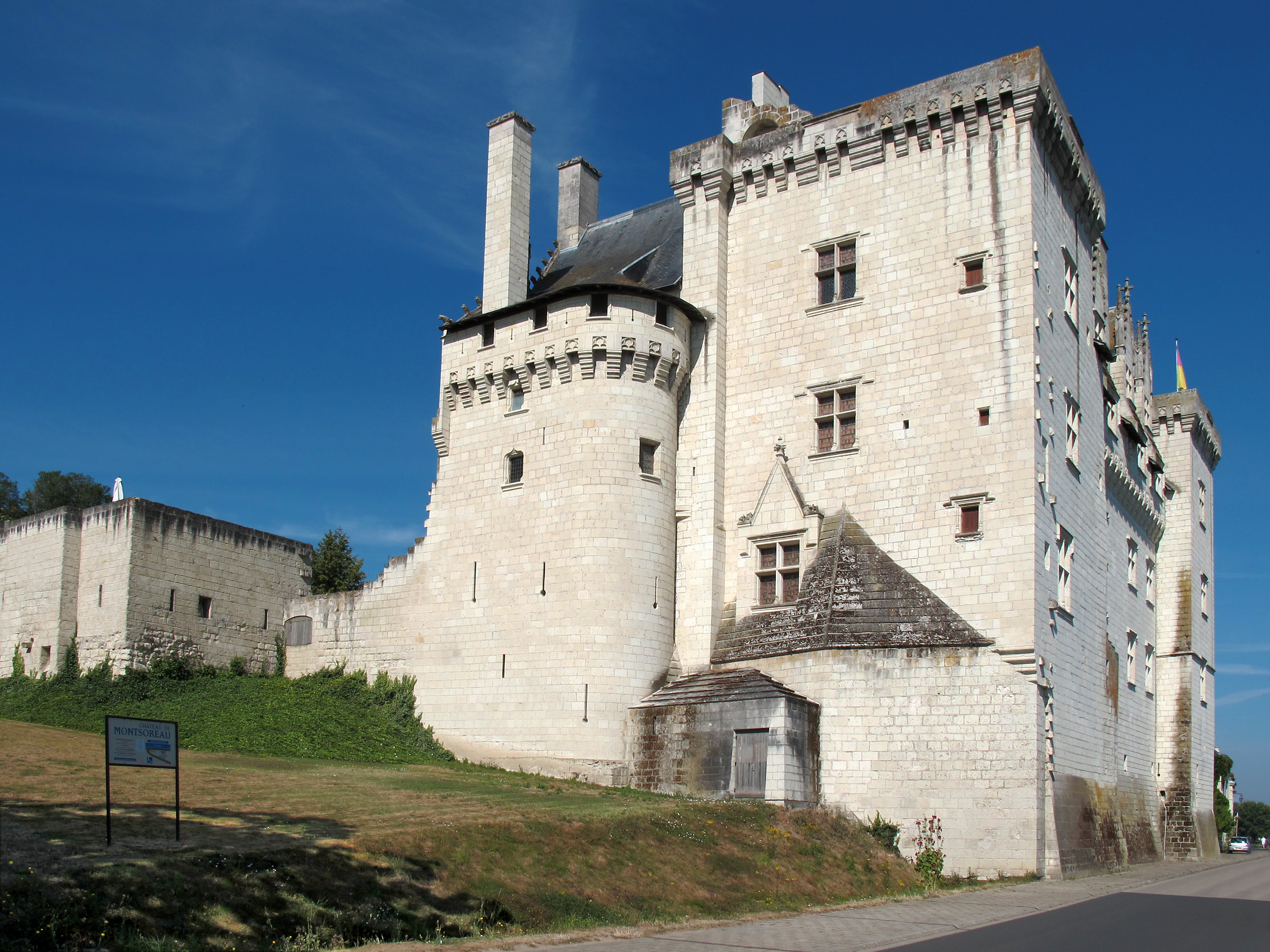
Chateau de Montsoreau

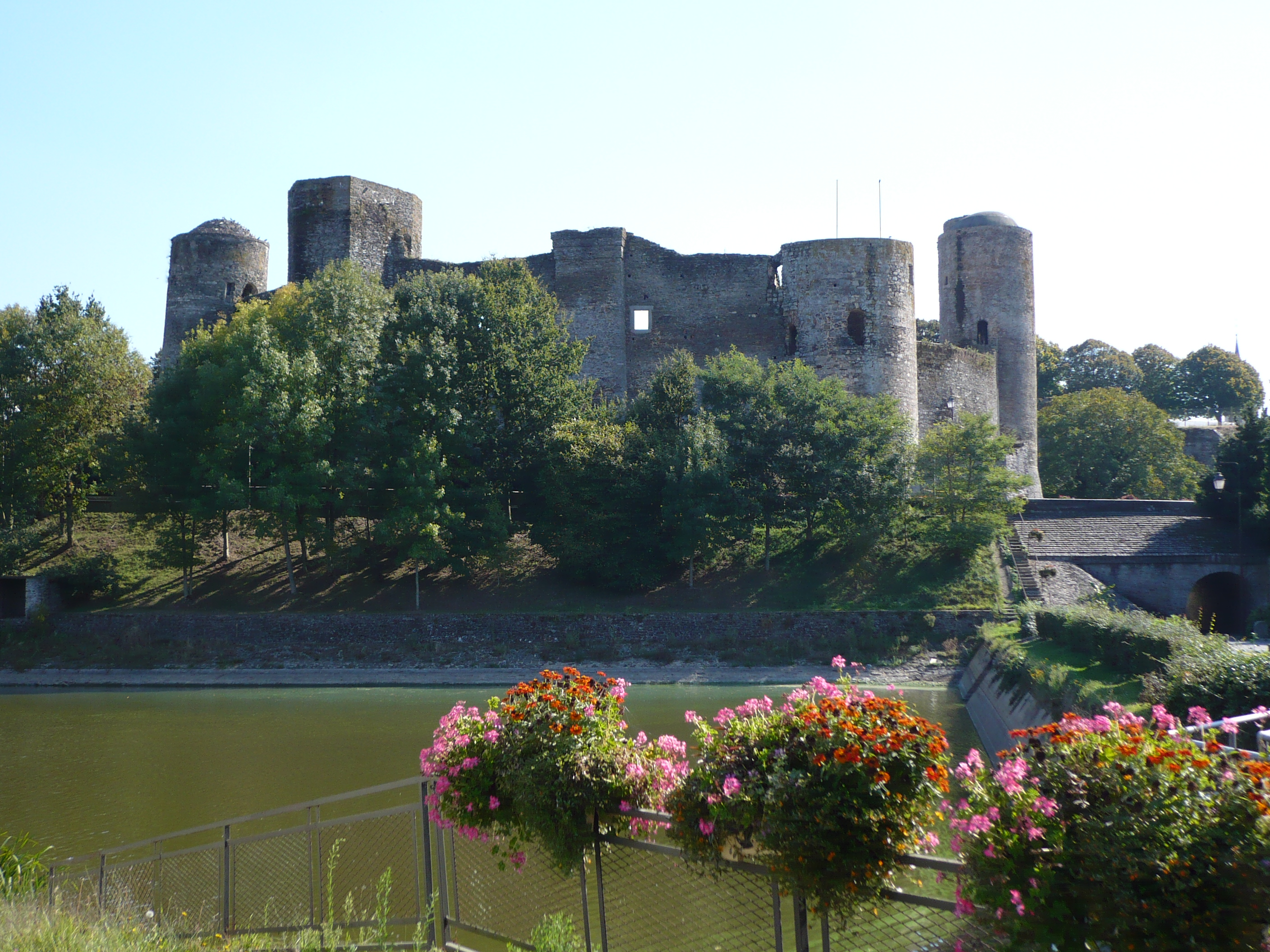
Medieval Castle of Pouancé

Loire-Atlantique (44)

Ancenis • Blain • Careil • ducs de Bretagne • Châteaubriant • Clisson • Goulaine • La Motte-Glain • Pornic • Ranrouët

Maine-et-Loire (49)

Angers • Baugé • Bourmont • Brézé • Brissac • Montreuil-Bellay • Montsoreau • Plessis-Bourré • Pouancé • Saumur

Mayenne (53)

Bois Thibault • Bouillé • La Courbe • Courtaliéru • Lassay • Laval • Mayenne • Montjean • Mortiercrolles • Sainte-Suzanne • Thorigné-en-Charnie

Sarthe (72)

Ballon

Vendée (85)

Apremont • Noirmoutier • Pouzauges • Puy du Fou • Sainte-Hermine • Tiffauges • Vouvant (Tour Mélusine) • Île d'Yeu • Commequiers

(→Top)

== Provence-Alpes-Côte d’Azur ==
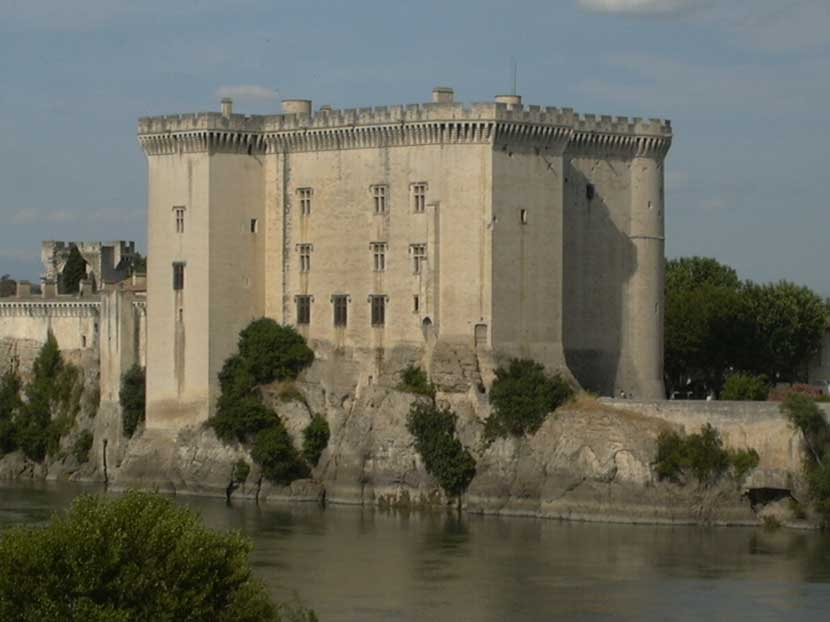
Tarascon

Alpes-de-Haute-Provence (04)

Sisteron

Hautes-Alpes (05)

Fort Queyras

Alpes-Maritimes (06)

Antibes • Gourdon • Gréolières • Lucéram • La Napoule • Nice • Roquebrune-Cap-Martin • Roquefort-les-Pins

Bouches-du-Rhône (13)

Baux • L'Empéri • If • Ners • Tarascon • Vernègues

Var (83)

Pontevès

Vaucluse (84)

Beaumont le Vieux • Crestet • Entrechaux • Lacoste • Lourmarin • Mornas • Murs • Thouzon

(→Top)

== List of former regions ==
- List of castles in Alsace
- List of castles in Champagne-Ardenne
- List of castles in Limousin
- List of castles in Nord-Pas-de-Calais
- List of castles in Picardy

== See also ==
- Château
- List of châteaux in France
- List of castles
