= Château de Saint-Thamar =

Castle in Terrou in the Lot département of France

Coordinates: 44.7889°N 1.9799°E

The Château de Saint-Thamar is a castle in the commune of Terrou in the Lot département of France. Dating from the 15th century, the castle was altered in the 17th and 18th centuries.

The castle is privately owned and not open to the public. It has been listed since 1975 as a monument historique by the French Ministry of Culture.

== See also ==
- List of castles in France
