= Château du Théron =

Castle in Lot, Occitania, France

Coordinates: 44.5213°N 1.1724°E

The Château du Théron is a ruined castle in the commune of Prayssac in the Lot département of France.

The castle was built on a very irregular plan because of the rock on which it sits and to which its contours are married. There are five main corners, four of which were reinforced by turrets built in the 15th century. The oldest part of the castle, the keep, dates from the end of the 13th century. Of all the castle's buildings, all that remains are three rooms from the early 14th century and the chapel which is later. The ramparts have partly disappeared: the north and west towers are still visible.

The Château du Théron is privately owned. It has been listed since 1973 as a monument historique by the French Ministry of Culture.

== See also ==
- List of castles in France
