= Château de la Pannonie =

Castle in Couzou, Lot, France

Coordinates: 44.7773°N 1.6537°E

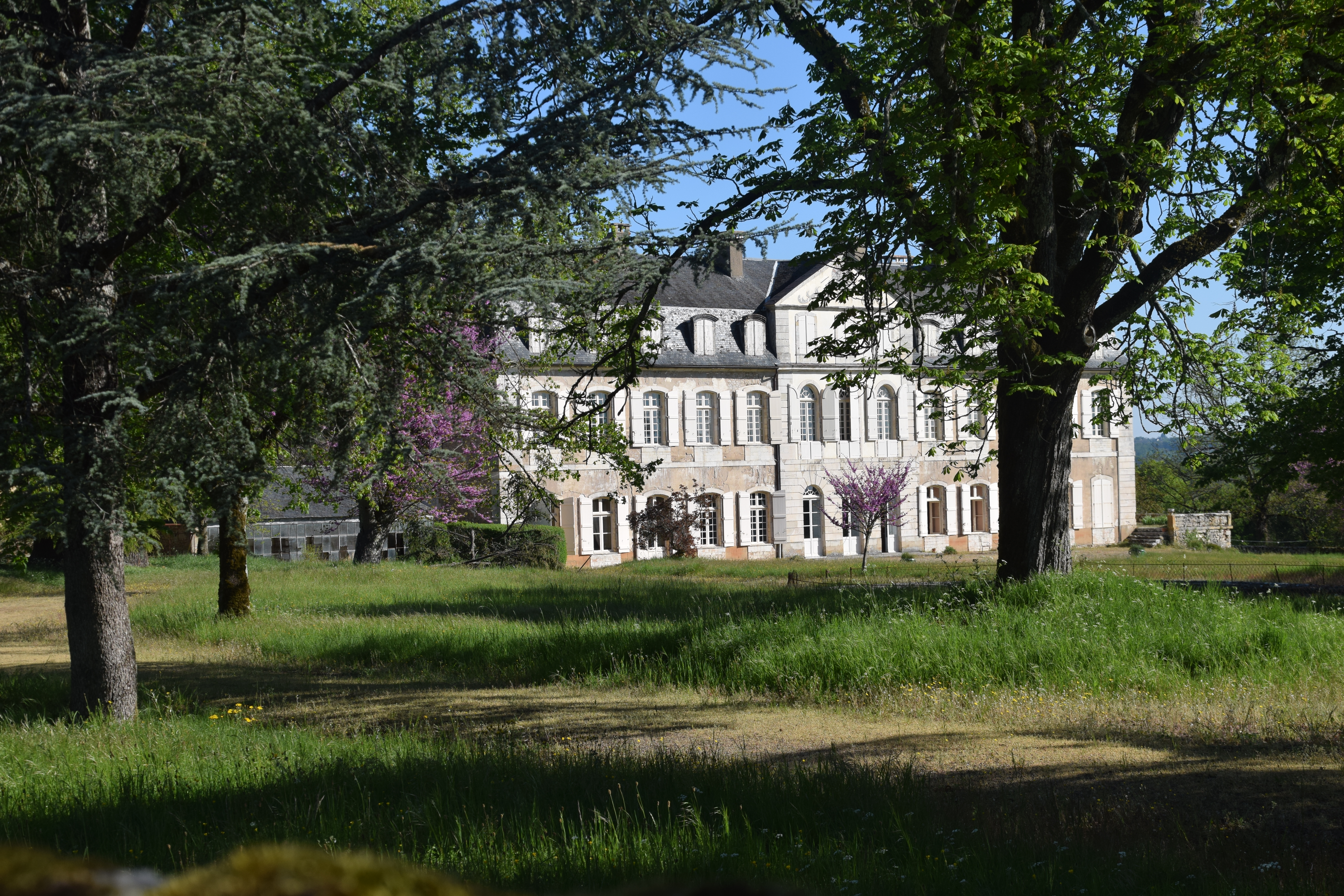
Chateau de la Pannonie

The Château de la Pannonie is a château in the commune of Couzou in the Lot département of France.

It has been listed since 1992 as a monument historique by the French Ministry of Culture.

== See also ==
- List of castles in France
