= Château d'Estarvielle =

Coordinates: 42.8190°N 0.41701°E

The Château d' Estarvielle is a former castle, now converted into a house, in the commune of Estarvielle in the Hautes-Pyrénées département of France.

== History ==
The building began as a castle in late 13th century and is first recorded in a legal document from 1276 as "Castrum Estarbiele". It was the residence of the family of Arroux d'Estarvielle until around the 16th century. In 1835, a stable and house (the date is above the door) were added.

== See also ==
- List of castles in France
