= Château d'Artias =

Coordinates: 45°12′49″N 4°0′2″E

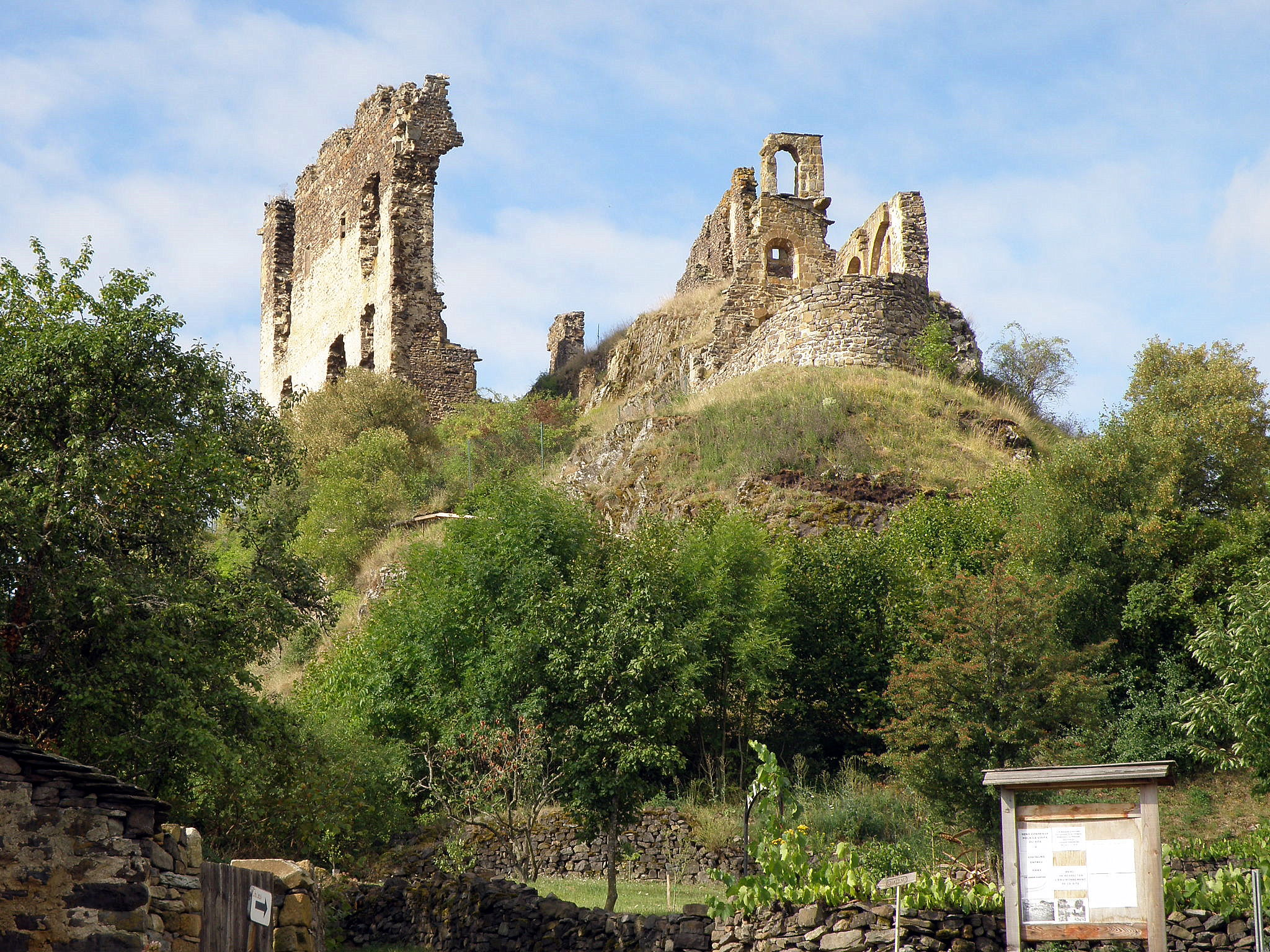
- Interactive map of Château d'Artias
- Location: Retournac, France

The Château d'Artias is a 900 year-old French castle in Retournac in the Haute-Loire département of France in the Auvergne-Rhône-Alpes region. It was strategically built on a rocky spur at an elevation of 723 meters or 2,372 feet, overlooking the meanders of the Loire river. The ruins of the chapel (built in the 12th century) were recognized as historic monuments in 1949.

== See also ==
- List of castles in France
