= Château de Beauville =

Castle in Nouvelle-Aquitaine, France

- Beauville, Lot-et-Garonne in France
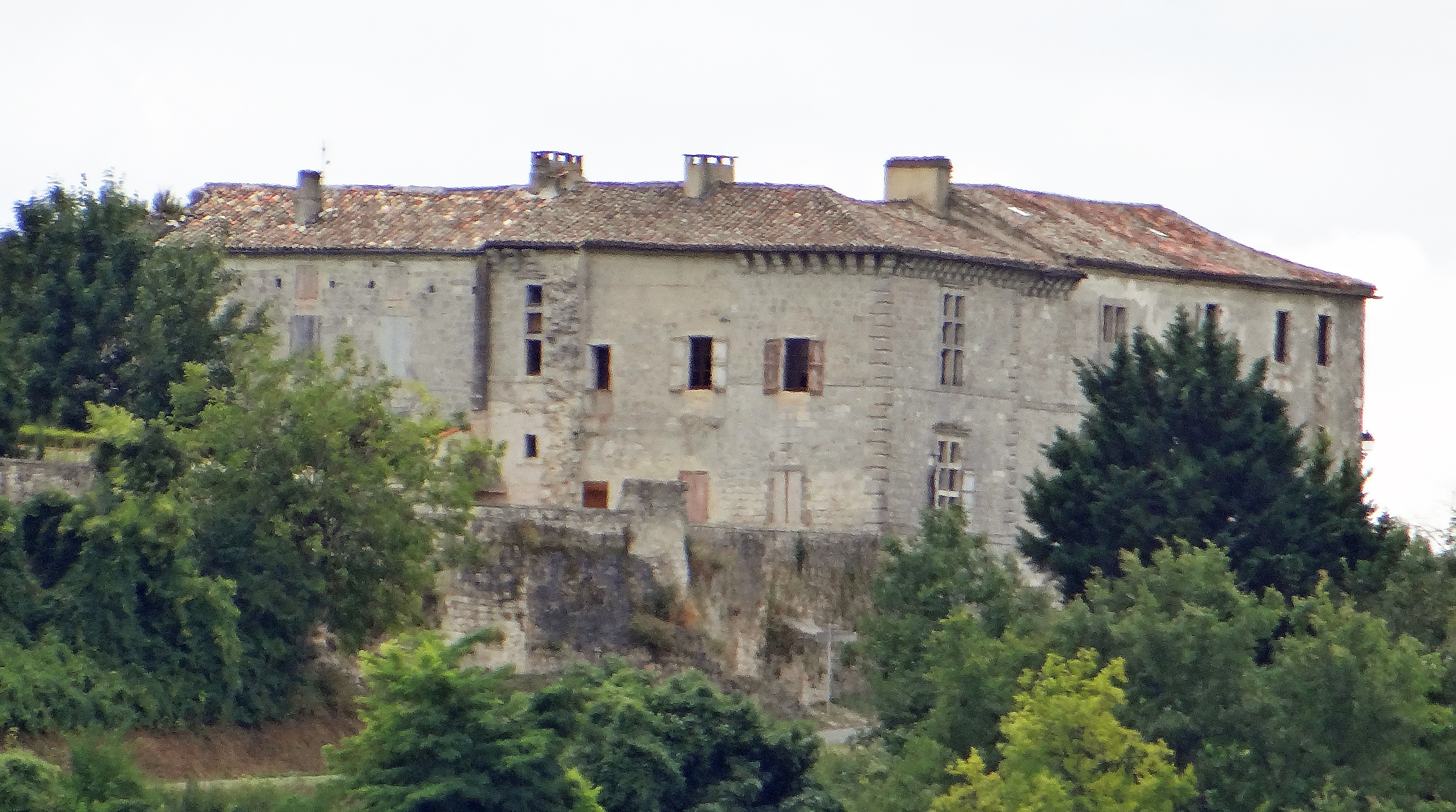
- General view

Site information
- Type: Castle
- Owner: Private

Location
- Coordinates: 44°16′45″N 0°52′42″E

Site history
- Built: 12th - 19th centuries

The Château de Beauville is a castle in the commune of Beauville in the Lot-et-Garonne département of France. It is located on a rocky promontory defending the village.

== History ==
The foundations date from the end of the 13th century. Most of the building dates from a 16th-century reconstruction. The castle had a T-shaped plan but one of the wings was destroyed. Part of the castle has retained a crown of machicolations. Some tall windows have double mullions. There is a large interesting staircase inside and old kitchens.

In 1574, François de Beauville led the successful defence of the castle against the Protestants.

The castle belonged to Talleyrand in the 17th and 18th centuries..

It was used as Gendarmerie barracks from 1831 to 1976. In 1874, the commune was ordered to make repairs to damage caused to the barracks by the establishment of a byway.

The staircase and kitchen were registered as monument historique on 11 December 1925, and then the whole of the house, the old curtain wall and the ground of the inner court were registered on 10 February 2006.

== Architecture ==
The castle consists of a home of the late 16th century which has a wing whose foundations date from the old castle at the end of the 13th century. The thickness of the walls, the quality of the stones, the refinement of their dressing, demonstrate the use of particularly competent stone cutters and land surveyors.

The 16th-century part of the building is decorated with mullioned windows. Renaissance architecture is also present in the entrance door and fireplaces. A wing of the building was rebuilt in the 19th century.

== See also ==
- List of castles in France

== Bibliography ==
- Jean Burias, Le guide des châteaux de France : Lot-et-Garonne, p. 29, éditions Hermé, Paris, 1985 ISBN 978-2-866650094
