= Château de Miramont (Aude) =

Ruined castle in Barbaira in the Aude département of France

Coordinates: 43°10′16″N 2°30′01″E

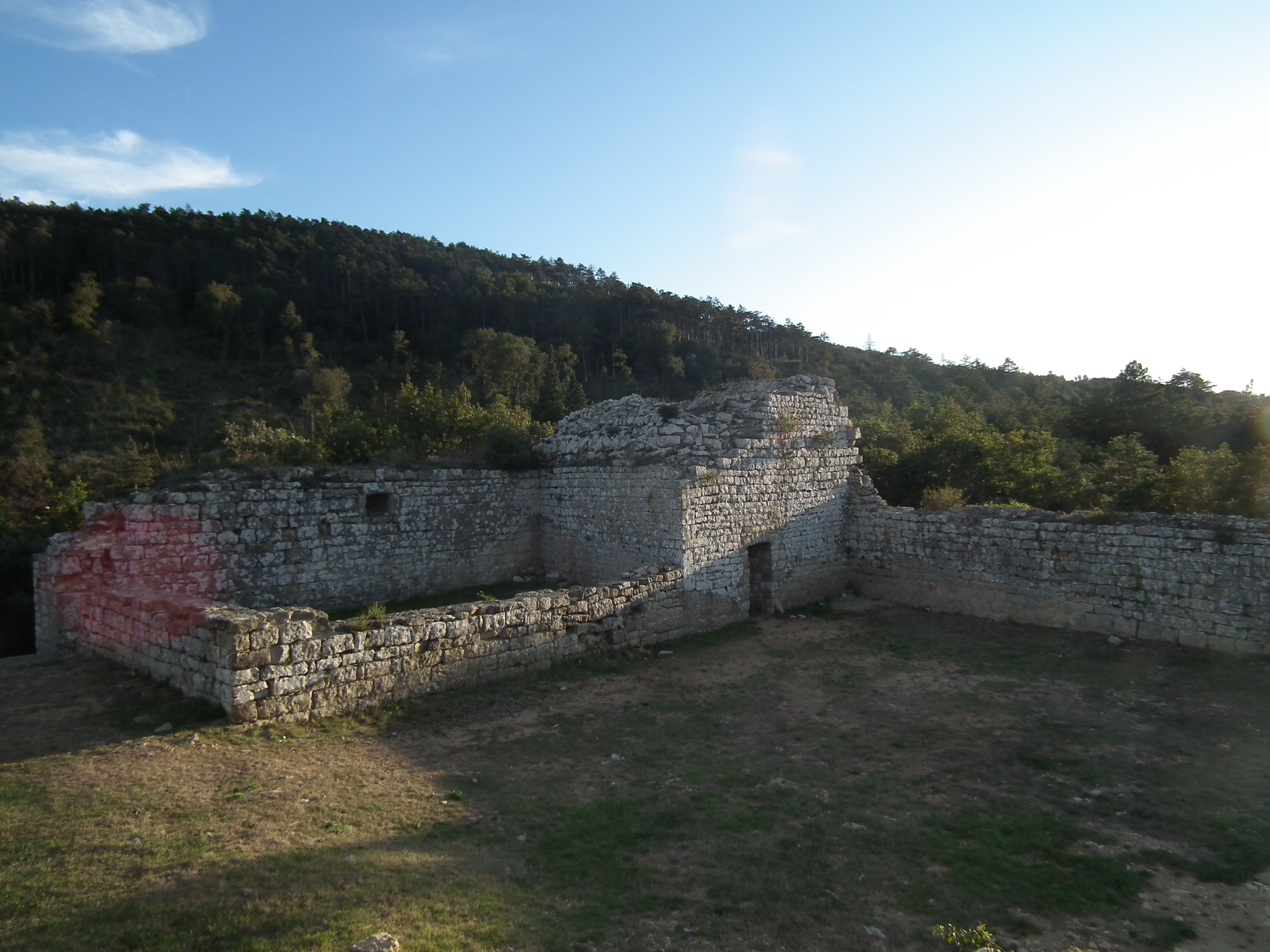
Château de Miramont

The Château de Miramont is a ruined castle in the commune of Barbaira in the Aude département of France.

The castle is the property of the commune. It has been listed since 1926 as a monument historique by the French Ministry of Culture.

== See also ==
- List of castles in France
