= Château de Pestillac =

Castle in Occitanie, France

Coordinates: 44.5461°N 1.0676°E

The Château de Pestillac is a ruined 12th-century castle on a site which also includes the ruins of a church, located in the commune of Montcabrier in the Lot département of France.

The site is privately owned. It has been listed since 1926 as a monument historique by the French Ministry of Culture.

== See also ==
- List of castles in France
