= Château de Rognac =

Castle converted to château and mill in France

Coordinates: 45°11′55″N 0°49′16″E

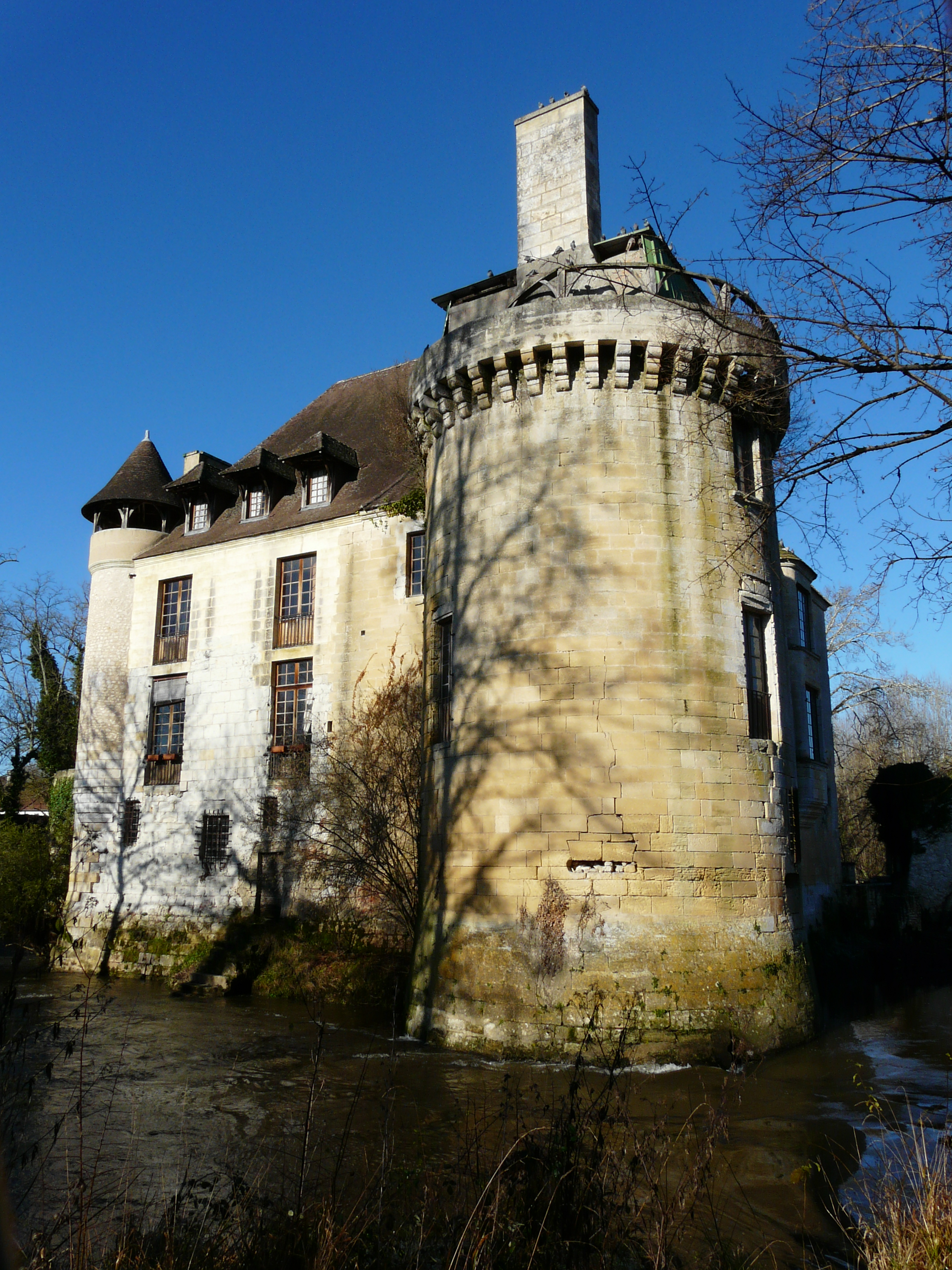
Château de Rognac

The Château de Rognac is a castle converted to a château and mill in the commune of Bassillac, Dordogne, France.

The site is privately owned and is not open to the public. It has been listed since 1945 as a monument historique by the French Ministry of Culture.

For a brief period, around the mid-1980s, it was used as a hotel and restaurant. Plans were drawn up to convert the mill into more accommodation.

== See also ==
- List of castles in France
