= Château de Font-Moreau =

Ruined castle in Centre-Val de Loire, France

Coordinates: 47.0606°N 2.1704°E

The Château de Font-Moreau (or Fontmoreau) is a ruined castle in the commune of Plou in the Cher département of France. The remains consist of the exterior fortifications, the keep and a tower. It is located in woods about 4km north east of the town. It is recorded from at least 1380.

== See also ==
- List of castles in France
