= Château des Ifs (Haut-Rhin) =

Castle in Haut-Rhin, Alsace, France

Coordinates: 48.1357°N 7.2878°E

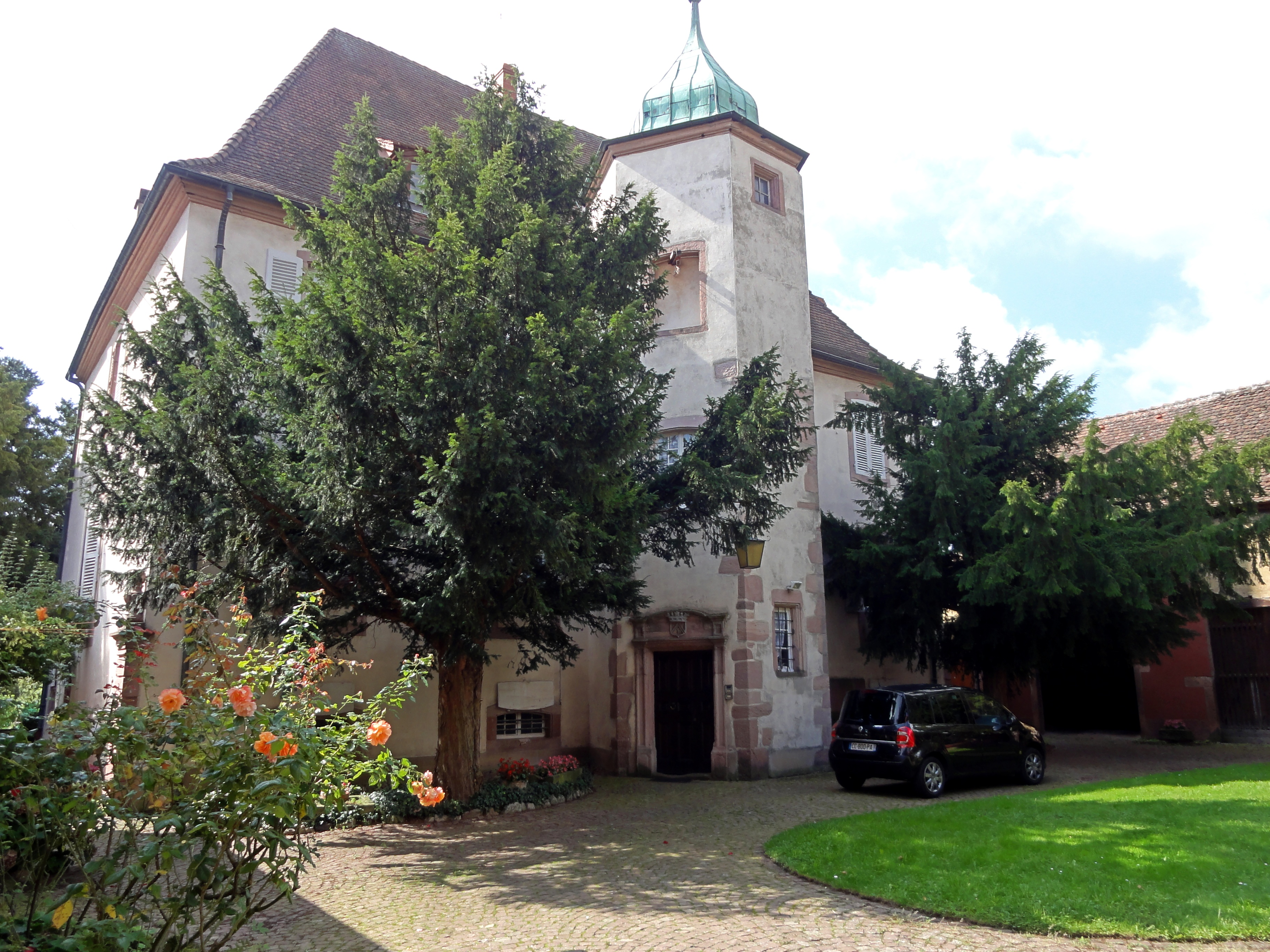
Château des Ifs

Château des Ifs is a castle in the commune of Kientzheim, in the department of Haut-Rhin, Alsace, France. It is a listed historical monument since 1999.
