= Château de Brieudet =

French fortified castle

Coordinates: 45.581869°N 0.666206°E

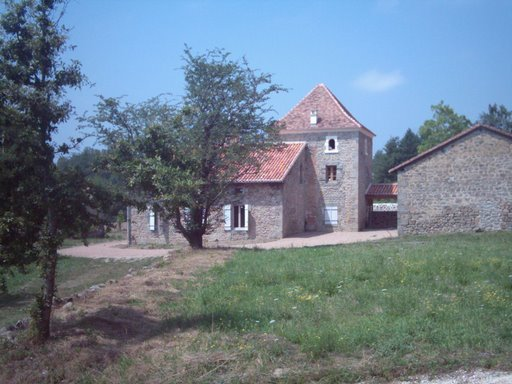

Château de Brieudet is a château in Saint-Estèphe, Dordogne, Nouvelle-Aquitaine, France.
