= Château du Lieu-Dieu =

Château in Nouvelle-Aquitaine, France

Coordinates: 45°09′46″N 0°46′26″E

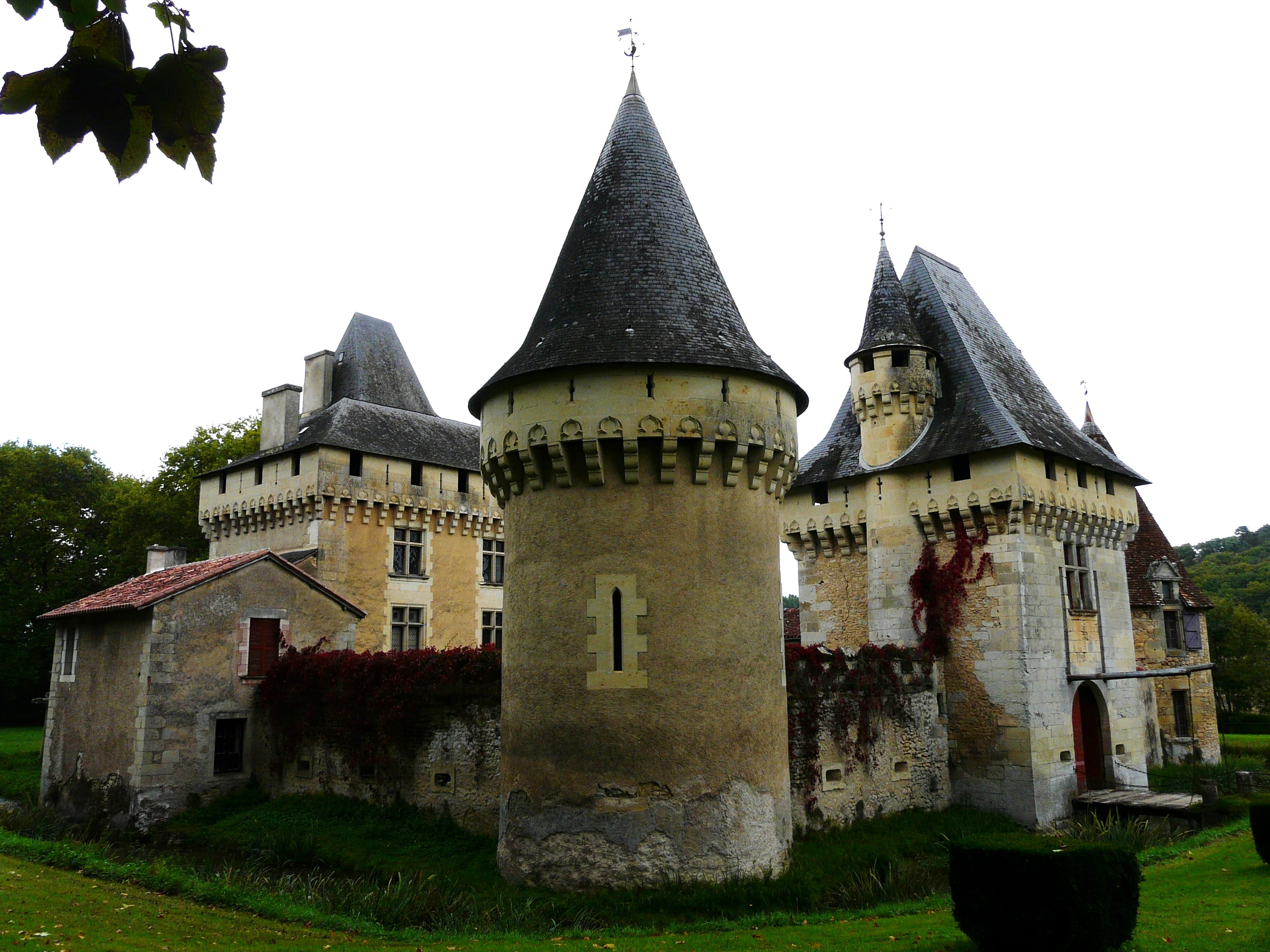

Château du Lieu-Dieu is a château in Dordogne, Nouvelle-Aquitaine, France.
