= Château Saint-Germain =

Château in Dordogne, Nouvelle-Aquitaine, France

Coordinates: 44°39′38″N 0°51′48″E

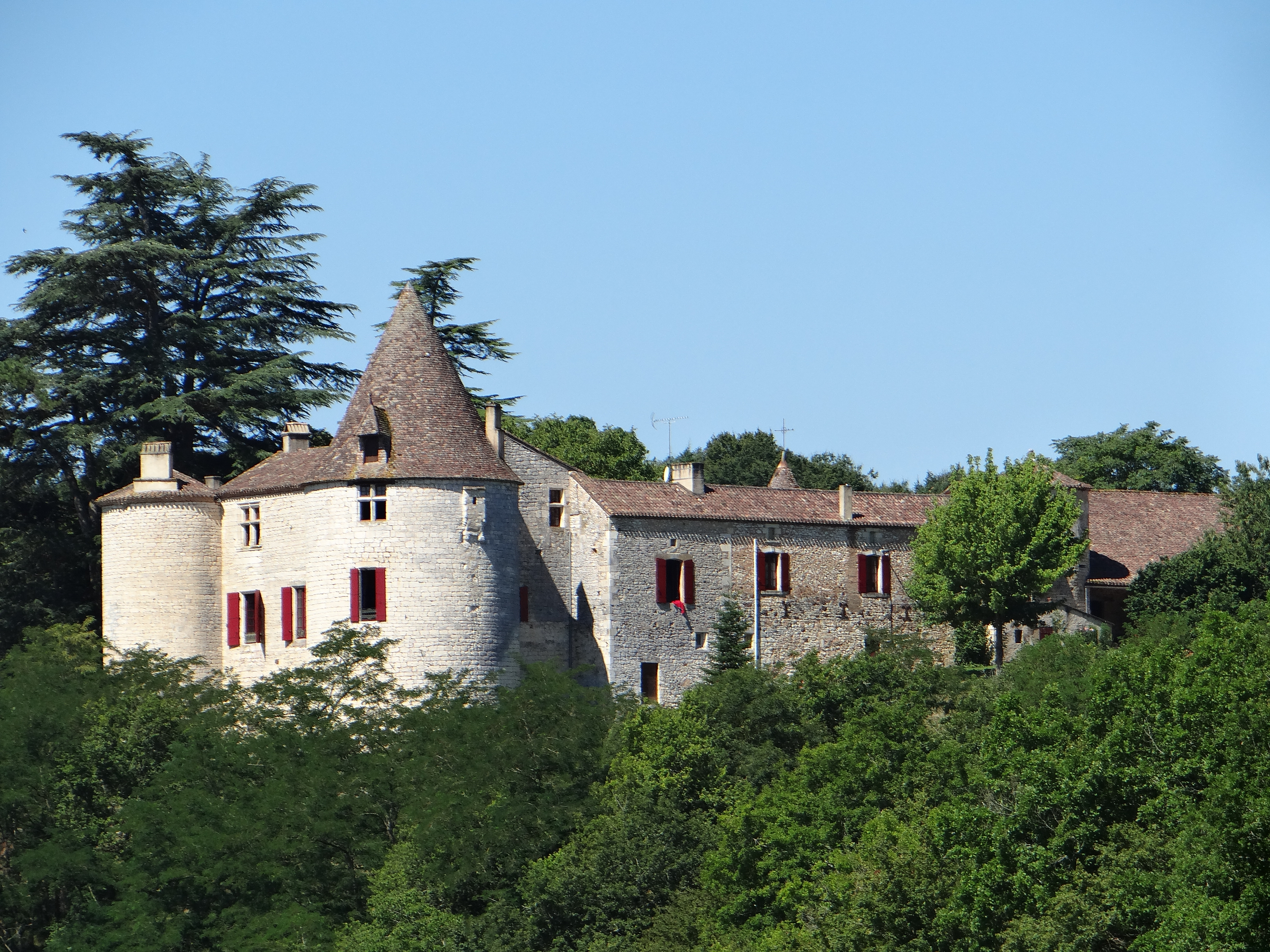
Castle of Saint-Germain

Château Saint-Germain is a château in Dordogne, Nouvelle-Aquitaine, France.
