= Château des Hattstatt-Schauenbourg =

Castle in Haut-Rhin, Alsace, France

Coordinates: 48.0361°N 7.2016°E

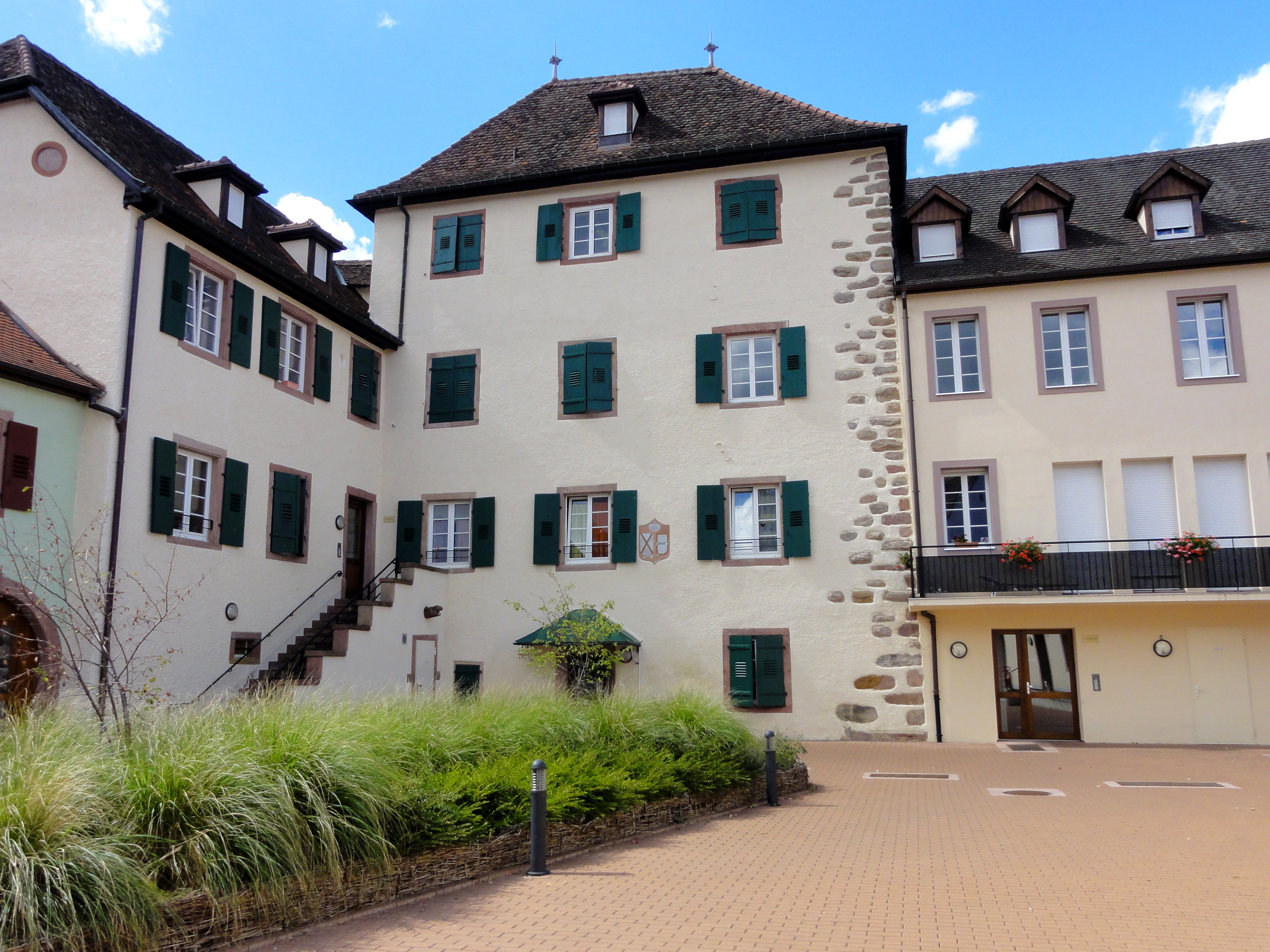
The now turned apartment building, Château des Hattstatt-Schauenbourg

Château des Hattstatt-Schauenbourg is a castle in the commune of Soultzbach-les-Bains, in the department of Haut-Rhin, Alsace, France. It is a listed historical monument since 2009.
