= Château de Lavison =

Château in Nouvelle-Aquitaine, France

Coordinates: 44°37′09″N 0°01′44″W

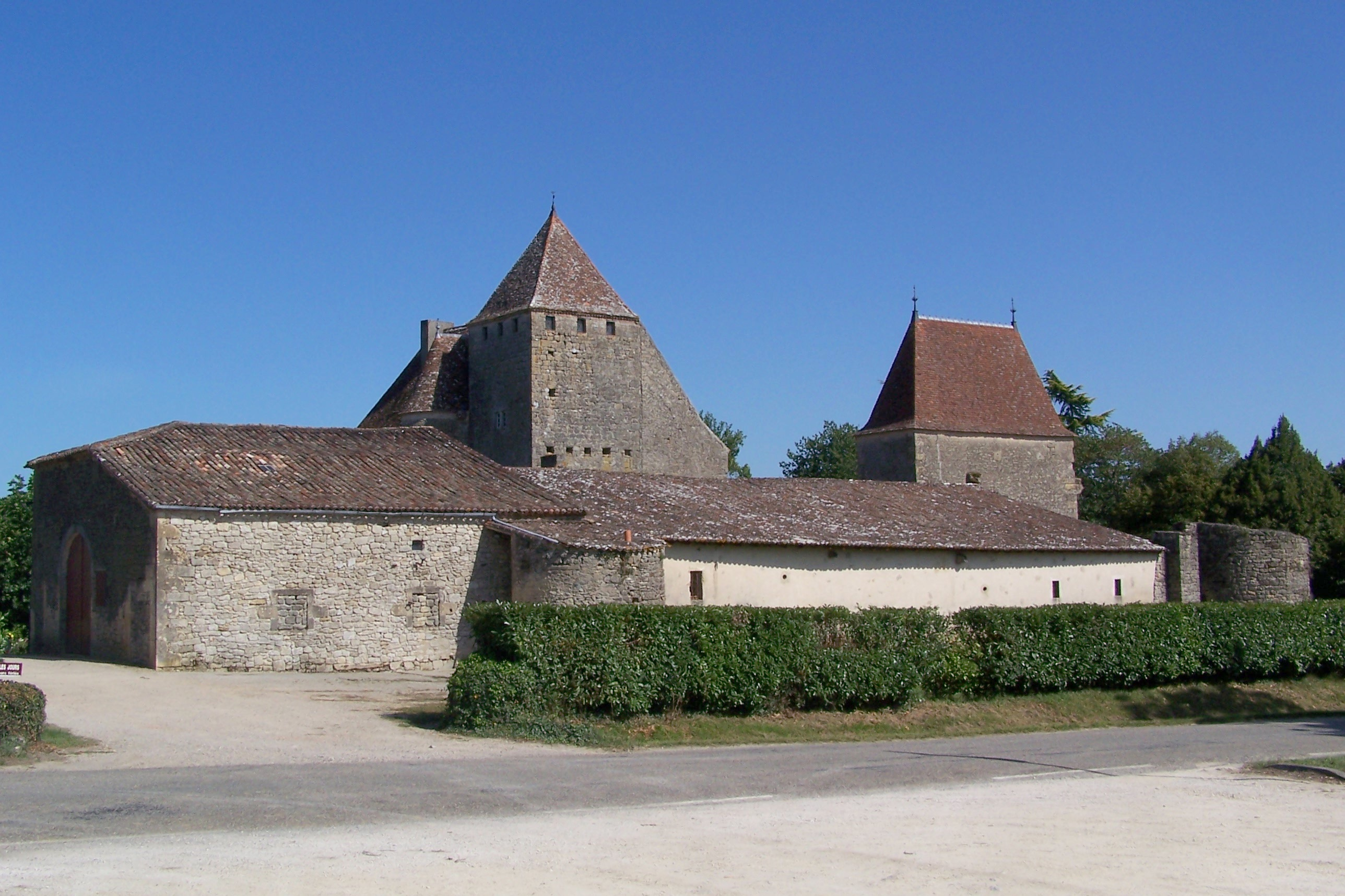
Castle of Lavison in Loubens (Gironde, France)

The Château de Lavison is a château in Loubens, Gironde, Nouvelle-Aquitaine, France.
