= Château de Lormont =

Château in Nouvelle-Aquitaine, France

Coordinates: 44°52′42″N 0°31′47″W

The Château de Lormont, also known as the Château des Archevêques or the Château du Prince Noir, is a château in Lormont, Gironde, Nouvelle-Aquitaine, France.
