= Château Faugas =

Château in Nouvelle-Aquitaine, France

Coordinates: 44°37′07″N 0°15′34″W

The Château Faugas is a château in Gabarnac, Gironde, Nouvelle-Aquitaine, France.

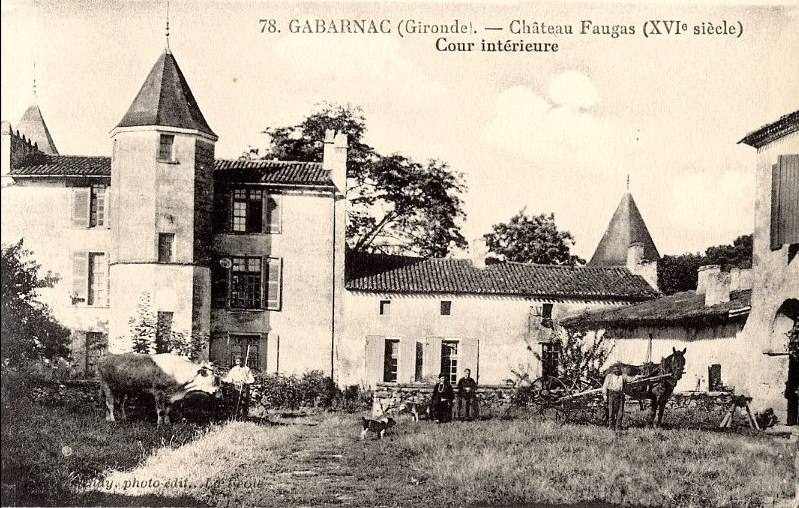
Château Faugas
