= Château du Hamel =

Château in Nouvelle-Aquitaine, France

Coordinates: 44°33′46″N 0°09′25″W

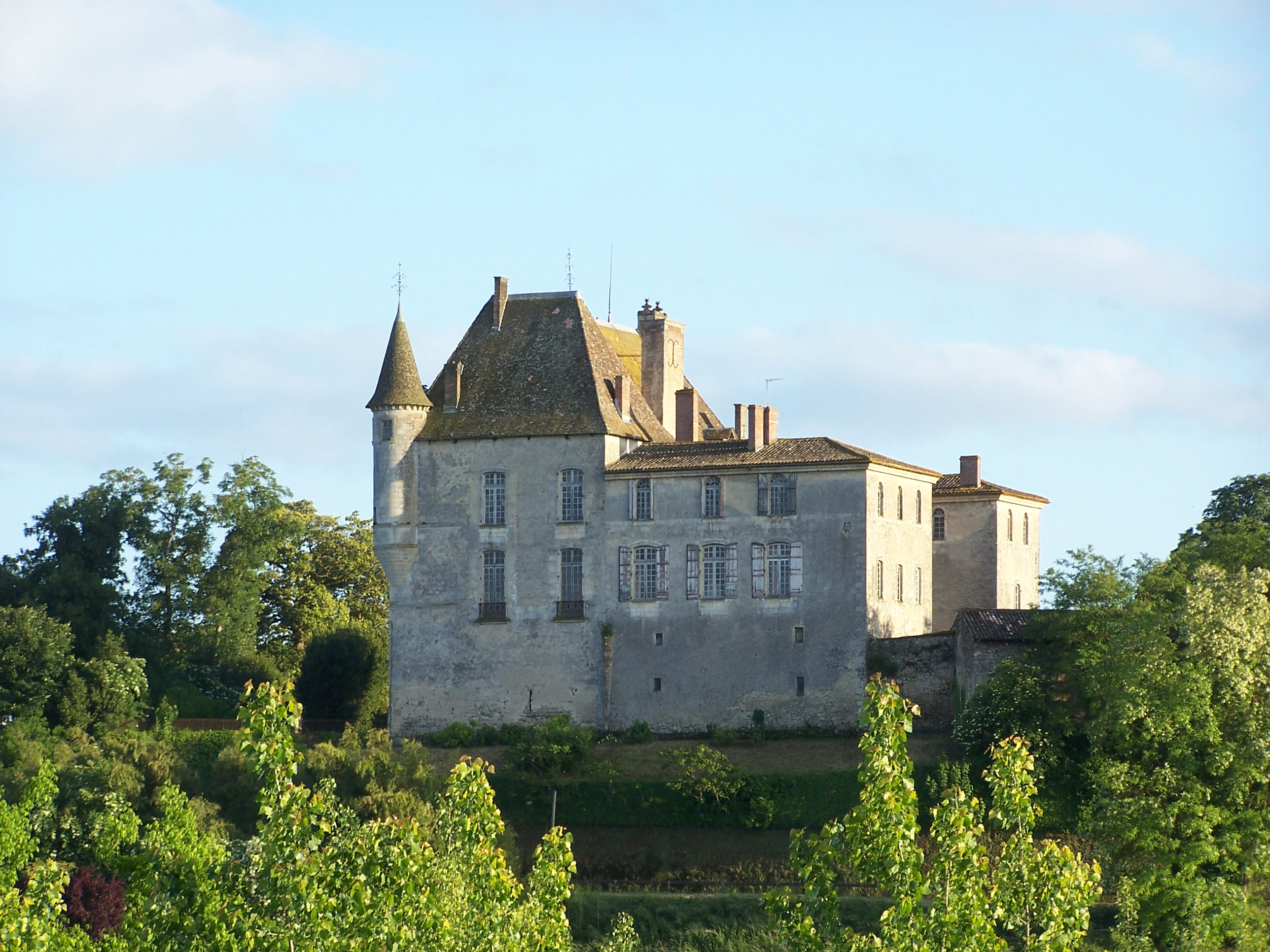
Château du Hamel

Château du Hamel is a château in the commune of Castets-en-Dorthe in the Gironde département of France.

The present building was constructed in the mid-16th century on the remains of a 14th-century castle. All that remains of this earlier structure is the base of the keep on the eastern side, seen in the interior as a heptagonal vaulted room.

The château is privately owned. It has been listed since 1963 as a monument historique by the French Ministry of Culture.
