= Château de La Chapelle-Faucher =

Castle in La Chapelle-Faucher, France

Coordinates: 45°22′10″N 0°45′04″E

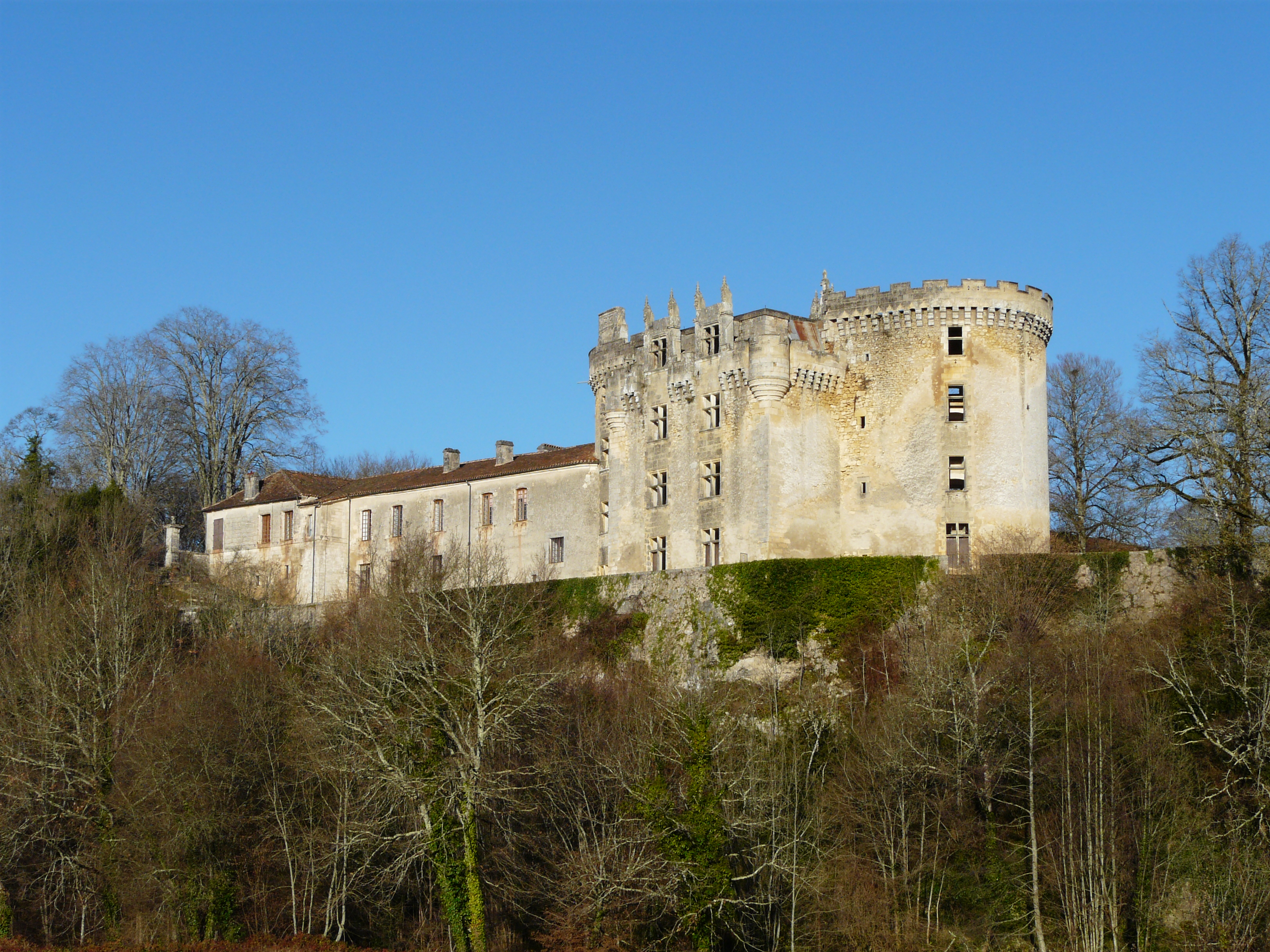

The Château de La Chapelle-Faucher is a castle in La Chapelle-Faucher, Dordogne, Nouvelle-Aquitaine, France. It was built in the 13th century, and modified in the 15th, 17th and 18th century. It was struck by lightning in 1916, which destroyed the roofs of the castle. These have not been rebuilt.
