= Château de Dreistein =

Ruined castle in Ottrott, Bas-Rhin, France

Coordinates: 48°26′24″N 7°23′27″E

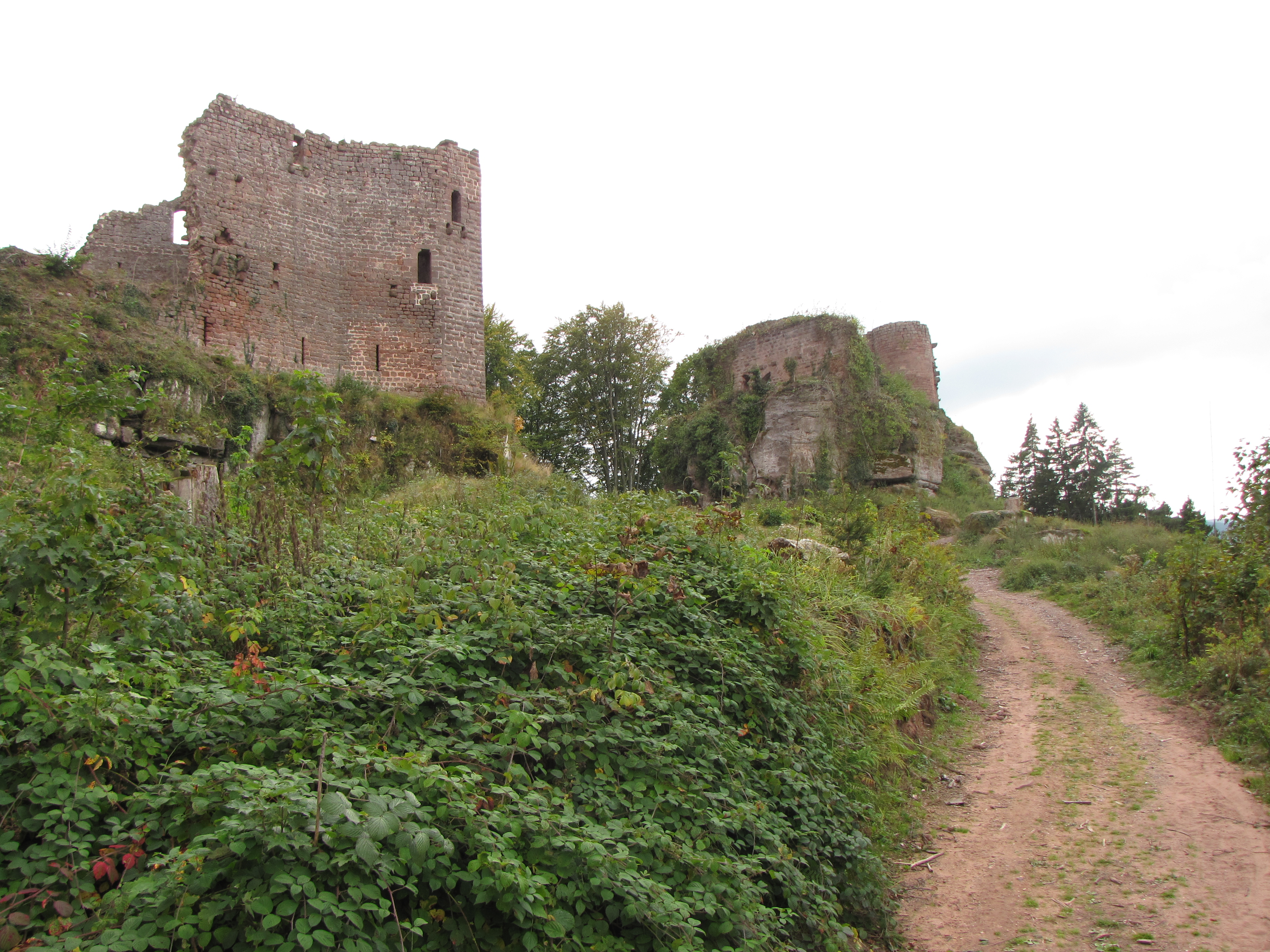
Château de Dreistein entrance

The Château de Dreistein is a ruined castle in the commune of Ottrott in the Bas-Rhin département of France. It is, in fact, three separate castles built on rocky promontories, hence the name drei Stein, "three stones" in medieval German.

== Location ==
The castle is sited on the massif of Mont Sainte-Odile, to the west of the abbey. It overlooks the valley of the Ehn which it controls along with the castles of Ottrott (Koepfel, Rathsamhausen and Lutzelbourg) and the Château du Hagelschloss. As with the latter, it is close to the Pagan Wall of Mont Sainte-Odile.

Access to Dreistein is only possible on foot, following paths laid out by the Vosges Club (Club Vosgien).

== History ==
The Château de Dreistein was built in the 13th or 14th centuries and was separated into two sections later. In the 17th century it was destroyed.

== Architecture ==
In common with all the neighbouring castles of its time, the castles at Dreistein are constructed from pink sandstone from the Vosges.

The remnants of the two castles are separated by a ditch. The western castle is flanked by a half open staircase tower.

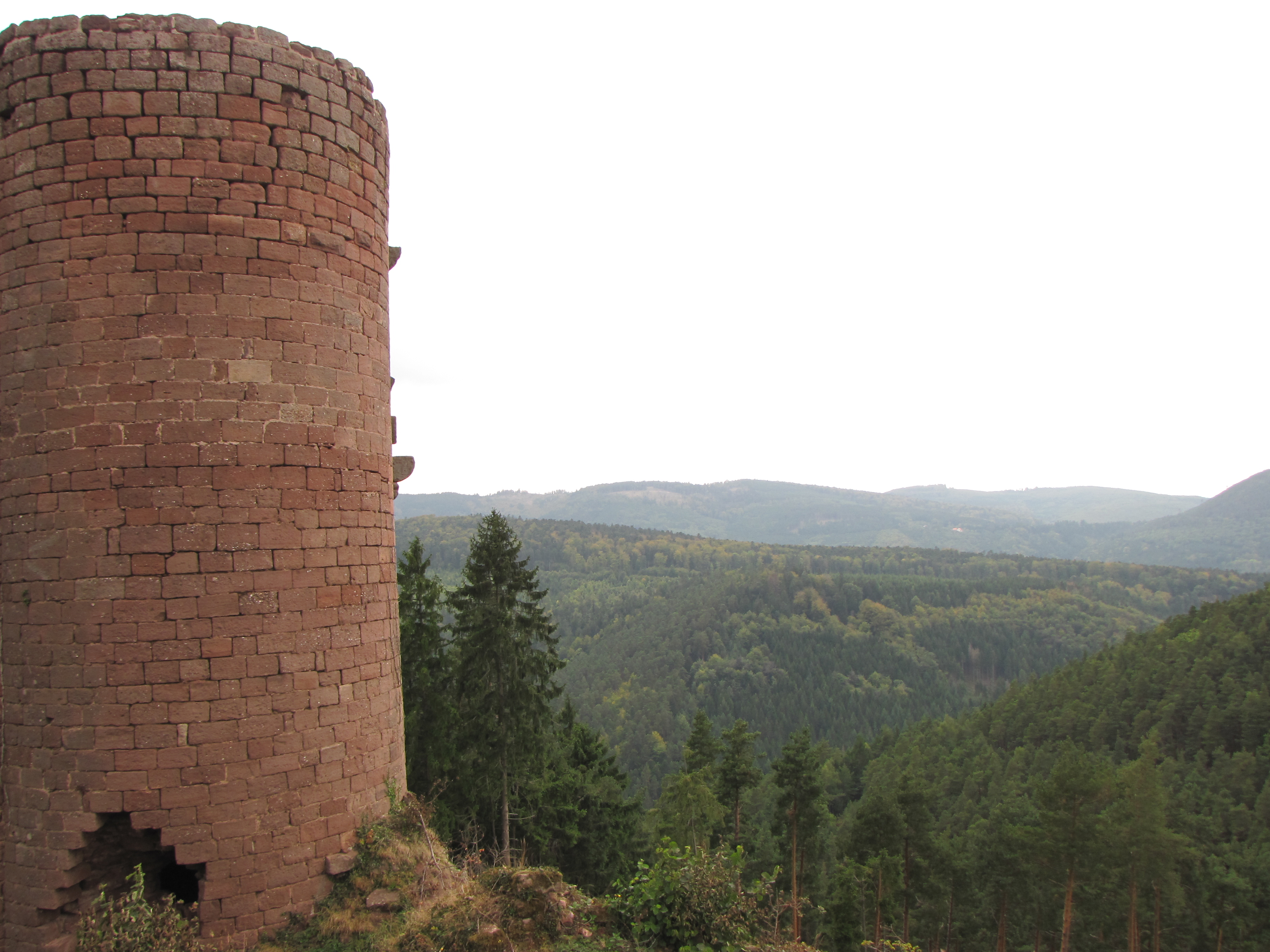
Keep of the western castle

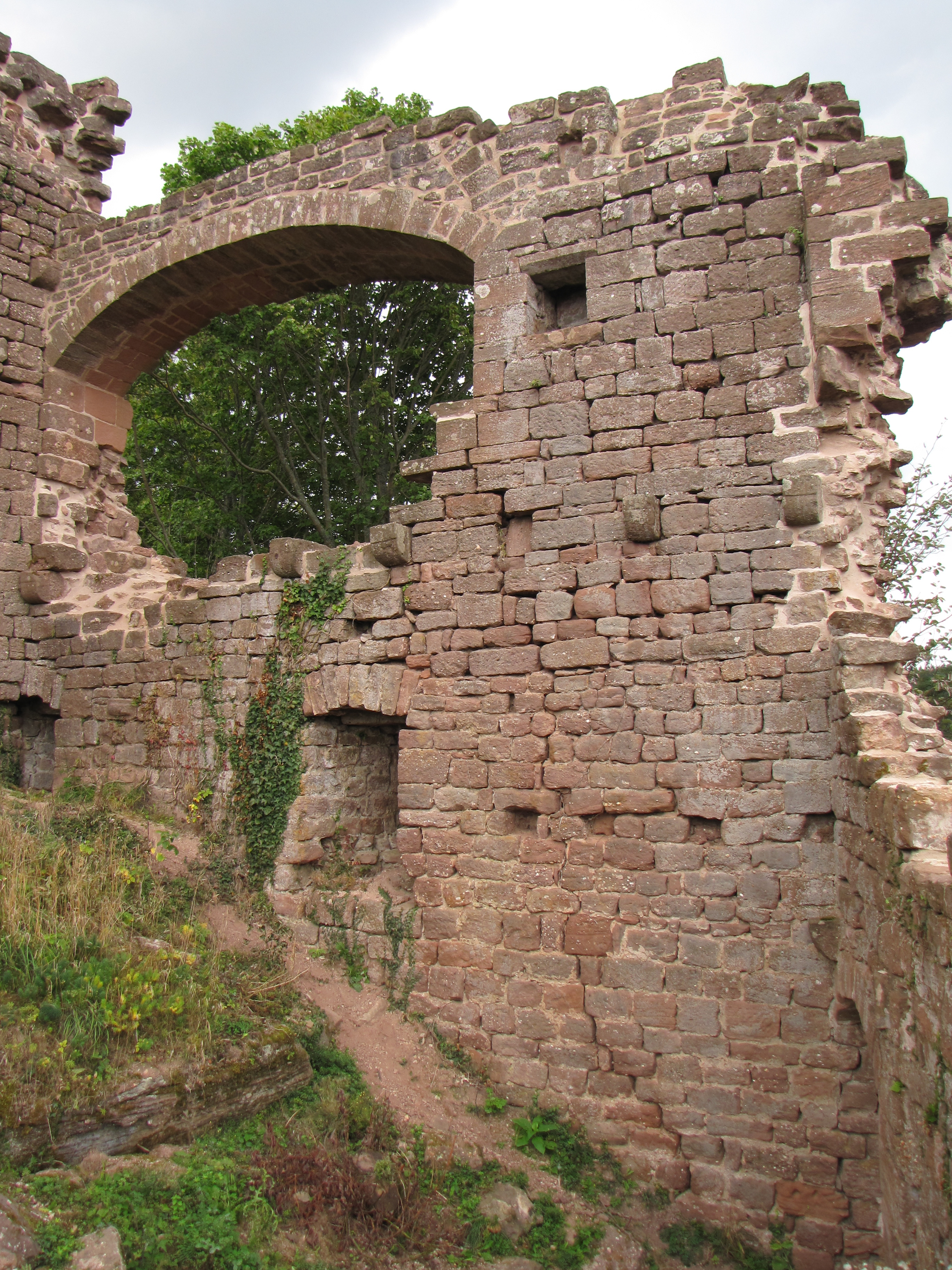
Arch near the western castle keep

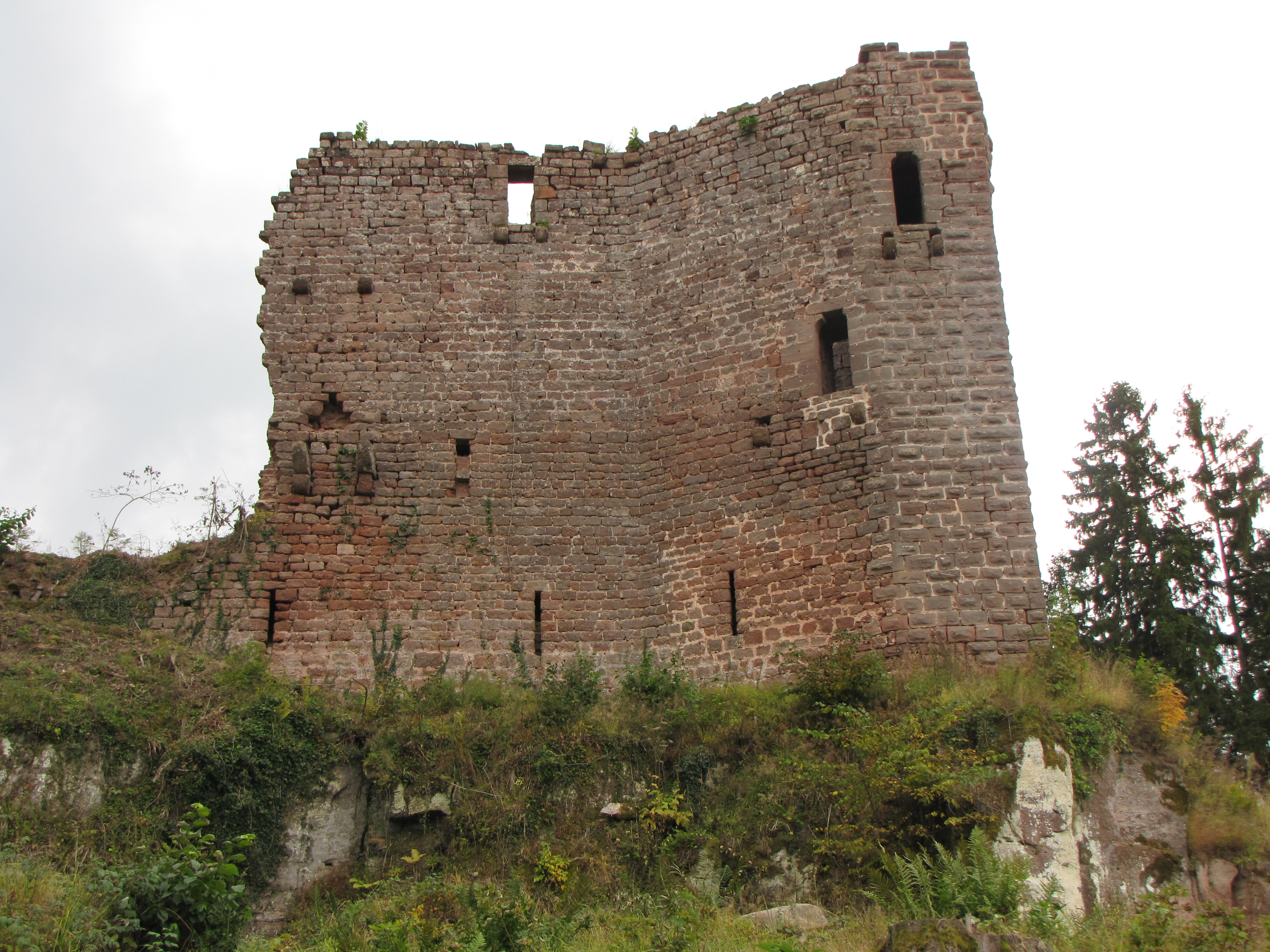
Façade of the eastern castle

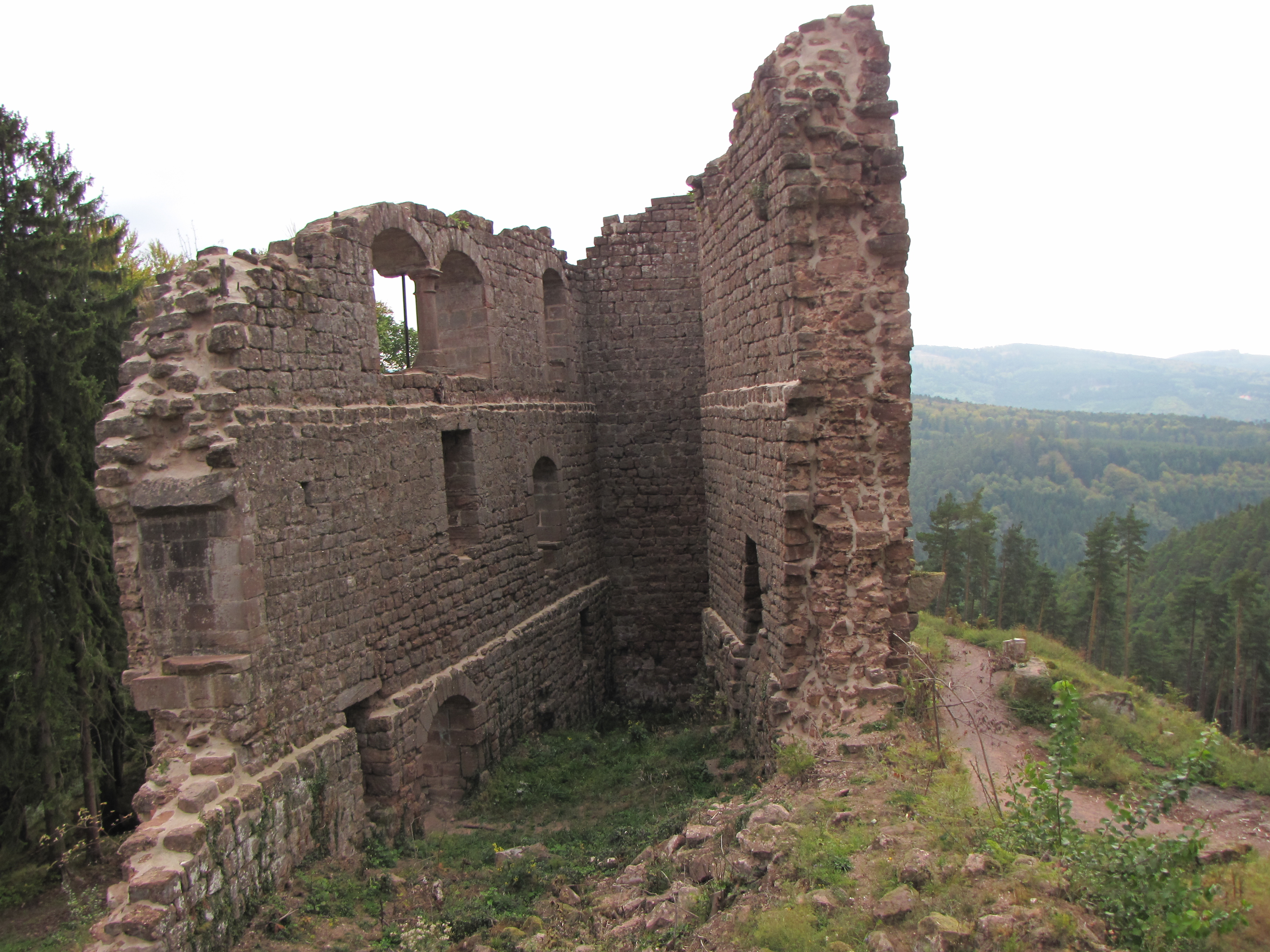
Interior of eastern castle

It has been listed since 1990 as a monument historique by the French Ministry of Culture.

== See also ==
- List of castles in France

== Bibliography ==
- Christophe Carmona & Guy Trendel, Les Châteaux des Vosges, vol 2, Editions Pierron
