= Château du Birkenfels =

Ruined castle in Bas-Rhin, Grand Est, France

Coordinates: 48°25′46″N 7°23′03″E

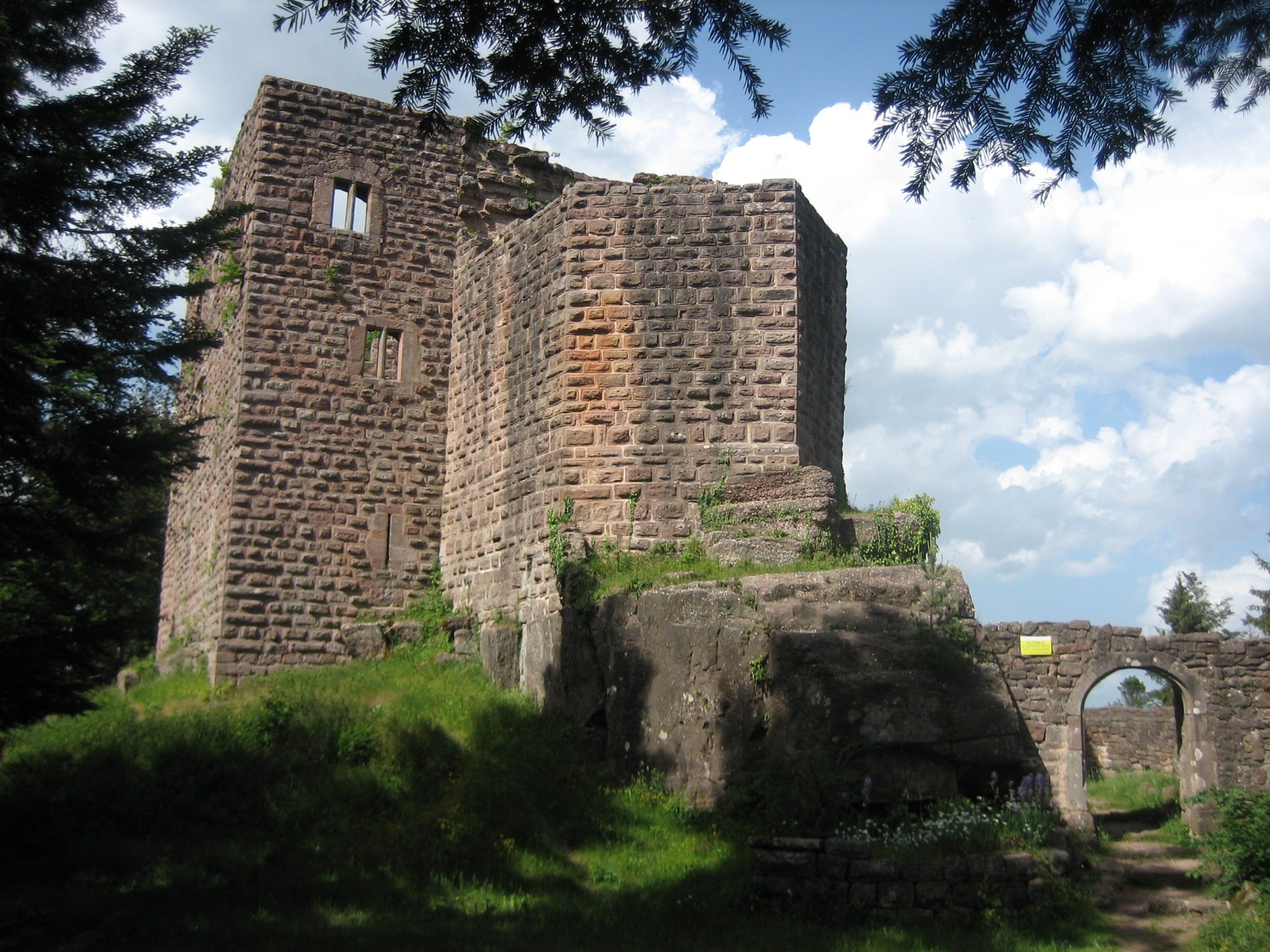
The ruins of Château du Birkenfels

The Château du Birkenfels is a ruined castle in the commune of Ottrott in the French département of Bas-Rhin. Originally constructed in the 13th century, it was burned down in the 14th century and restored in the 15th. It is surrounded by the Obernai Forest.

== History ==
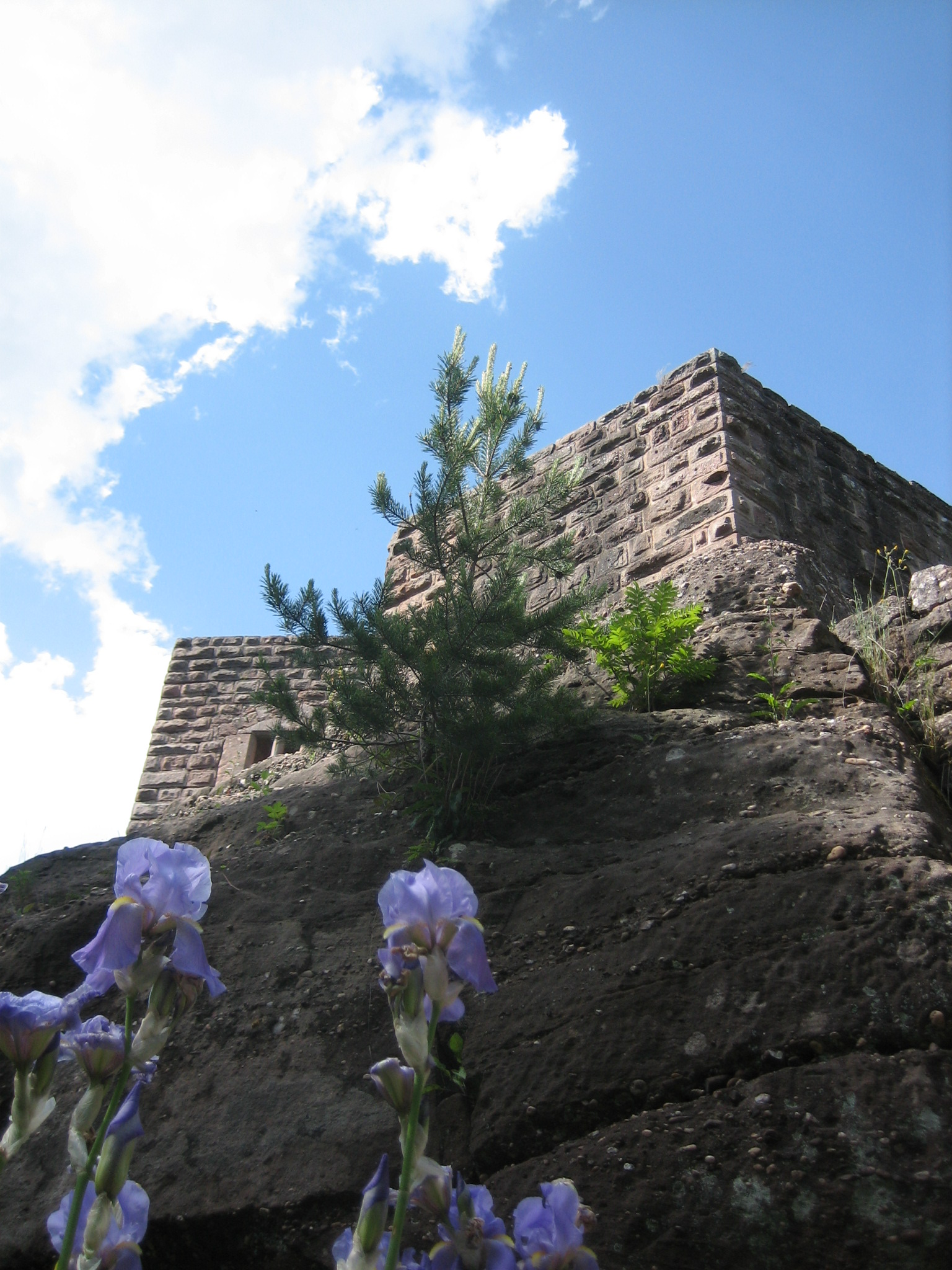
Tower

Architects and historians date the construction of the Château du Birkenfels to around 1260. The earliest recorded mention is from 1289. The entrance tower to the house and the lower courtyard are from the late 15th or early 16th century.

It was built by Burkhard Berger, a vassal of the bishop of Strasbourg. The castle's position allowed surveillance of the old Roman road running from Mont Sainte-Odile to Champ du Feu and the valley of the Bruche.

The castle belonged the Berger family until 1532, then to the Mundolsheim family until the French Revolution. The castle fell into ruins after the Thirty Years' War and was taken over by the town of Obernai, becoming part of the continuous forest between Obernai and Bernardswiller.

The castle is today in a poor state. Remains include the ditch, wall, keep and lower courtyard.

The castle is privately owned. It has been classified by the French Ministry of Culture as monument historique since 1984.

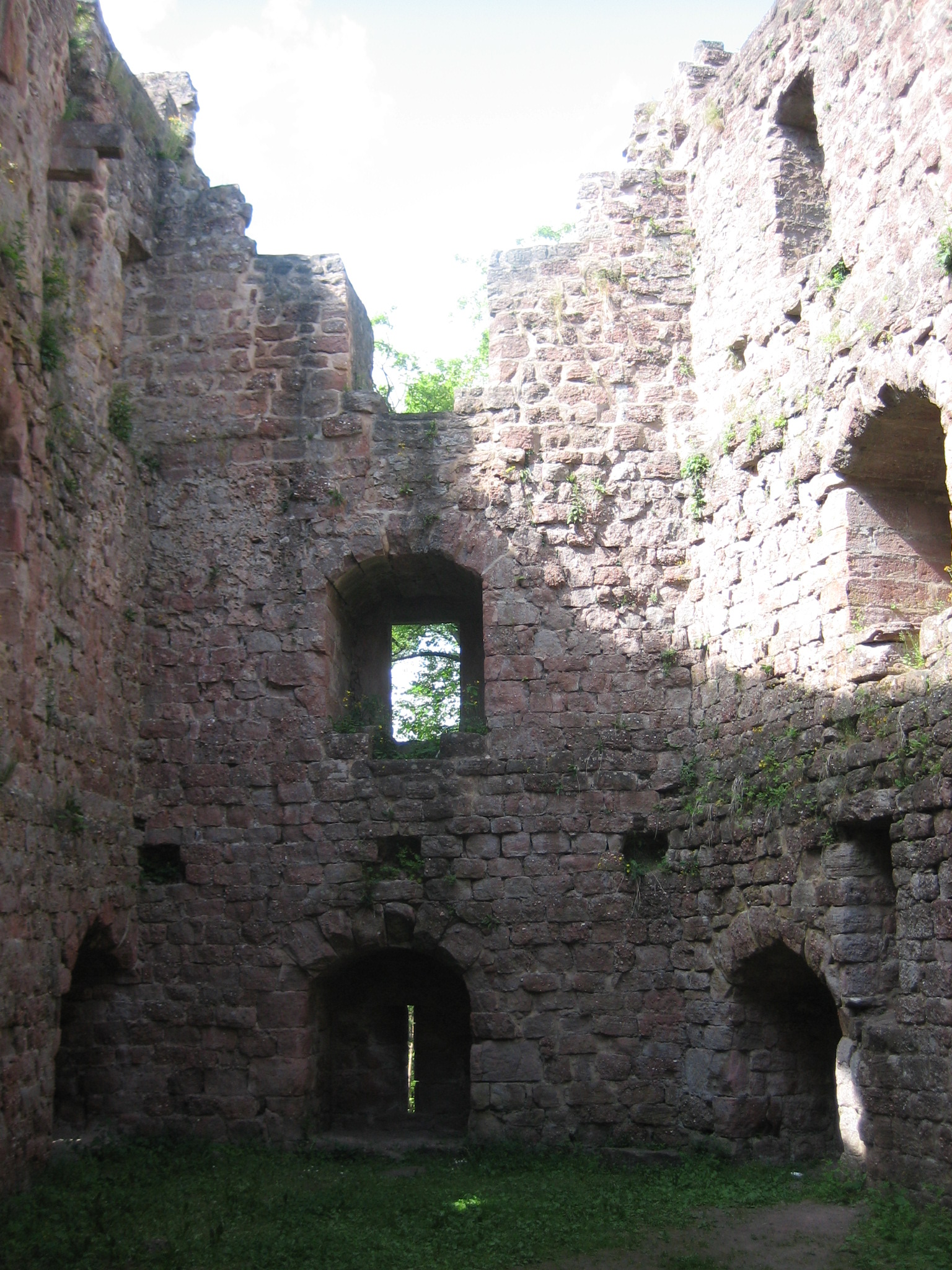
Interior view

== See also ==
- List of castles in France
