= Château du Kagenfels =

Ruined castle in Grand Est, France

Coordinates: 48°26′42″N 7°21′59″E

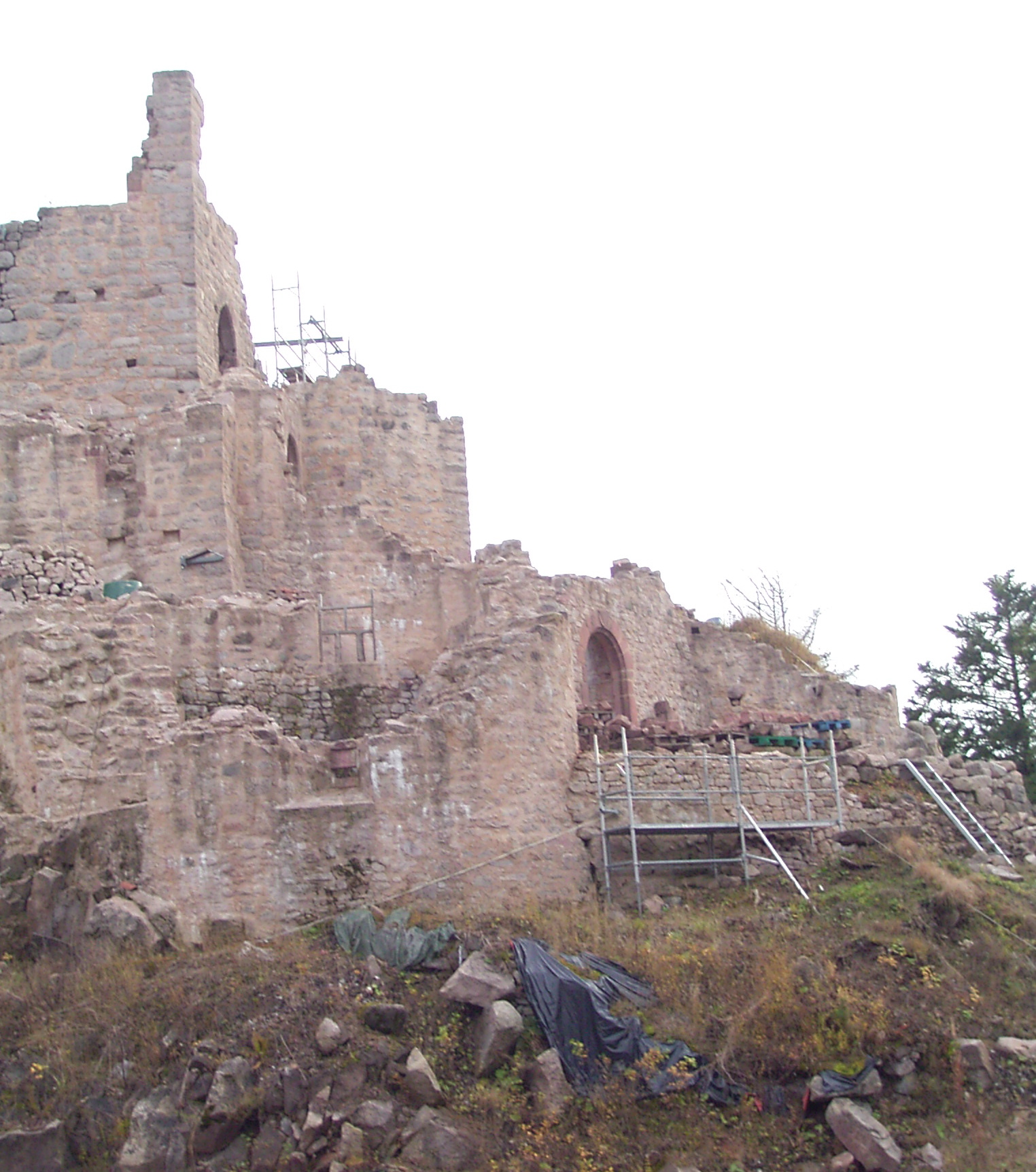

Location of the Château du Kagenfels in Alsace

The Château du Kagenfels (also known as Kaguenfels ou Kagenburg) is a ruined castle situated in the Forest of Obernai, in the commune of Ottrott in the Bas-Rhin département of France. It was constructed in the 12th century.

The Château du Kagenfels was built by a certain Kagen who gave his name to the castle.

The castle appears on the French Ministry of Culture database and is described as being in a poor state, but has no official protection as a monument historique. It is constructed largely of granite. A programme of restoration is underway.

== History ==
The castle was constructed in 1262 by Albrecht von Kage (Albert de Kage), Ministerialis of the Bishop of Strasbourg. The castle passed successively to the nobles of Hohenstein, then to Utenheim and Ramstein, who sold it in 1559 to Lucas Wischbech (Luc Wisebock) who repaired and enlarged it. In 1563, the town of Obernai bought it. It was destroyed during the Thirty Years War and is recorded as ruins in 1664.

== See also ==
- Château du Birkenfels: neighbouring castle
- List of castles in France

== Bibliography ==
- Charles-Laurent Salch, Nouveau dictionnaire des châteaux Forts d'Alsace, Alsatia, 1991.
- J. Braun, "Châteaux de la forêt d'Obernai", in Bull. Dambach-Barr-Obernai, 1974
