= Ottrott =

- Commune
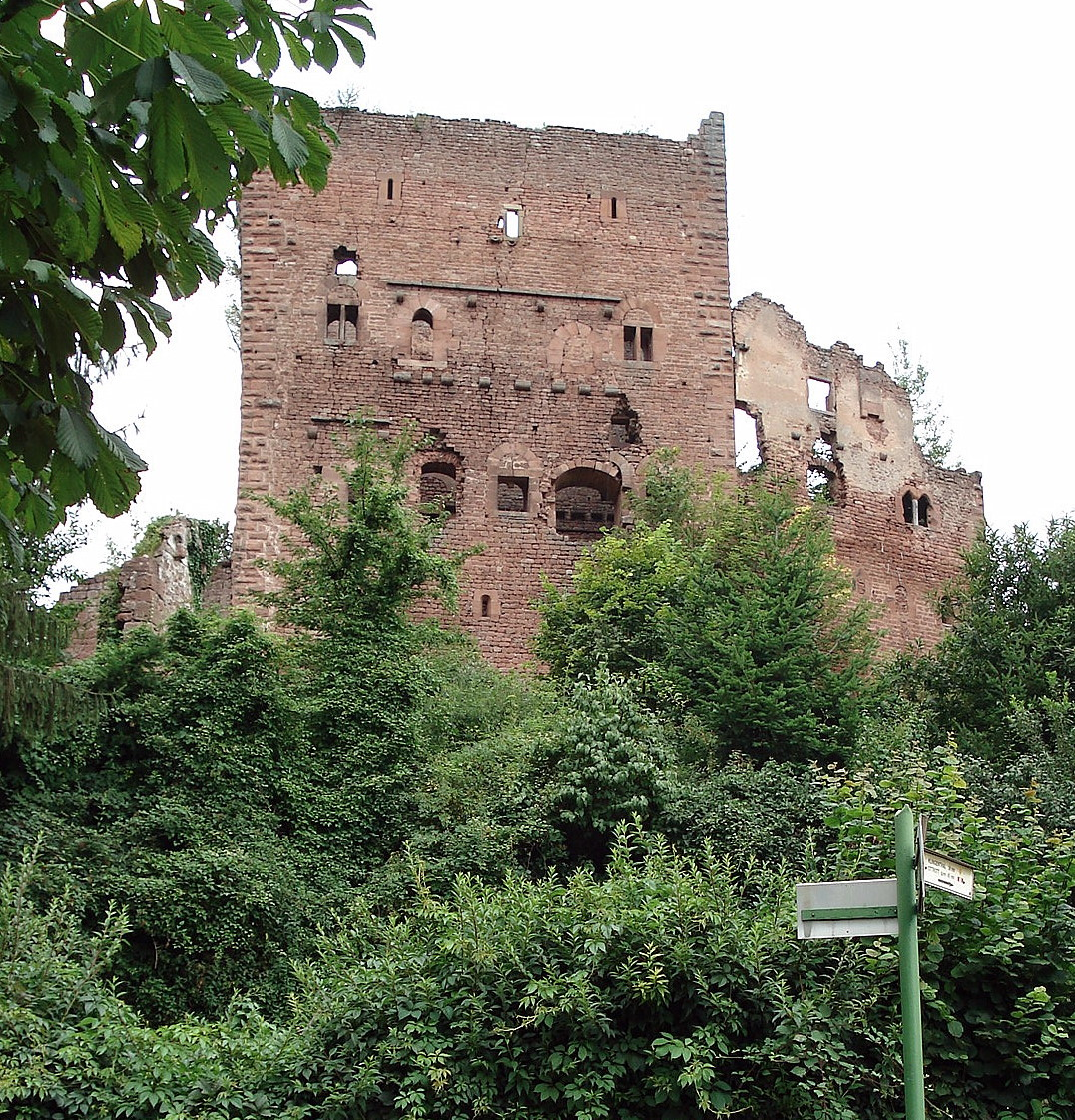
- Rathsamhausen castle

- Coat of arms
- Location of Ottrott
- Location within France Location within Grand Est
- Coordinates: 48°27′31″N 7°25′35″E
- Country: France
- Region: Grand Est
- Department: Bas-Rhin
- Arrondissement: Molsheim
- Canton: Molsheim

Government
  - Mayor (2020–2026): Claude Deybach
- Area^{1}: 28.89 km^{2} (11.15 sq mi)
- Highest elevation: 1,052 m (3,451 ft)
- Lowest elevation: 230 m (750 ft)
- Population (2023): 1,620
  - Density: 56.1/km^{2} (145/sq mi)
- Time zone: UTC+01:00 (CET)
  - Summer (DST): UTC+02:00 (CEST)
- INSEE/Postal code: 67368 /67530
- ^{1} French Land Register data, which excludes lakes, ponds, glaciers > 1 km^{2} (0.386 sq mi or 247 acres) and river estuaries.

Ottrott (French pronunciation: [ɔtʁɔt]) is a commune in the Bas-Rhin department in Grand Est in north-eastern France. It lies southwest of Strasbourg. The vineyards in and around Ottrott produce the red Rouge d'Ottrott, a geographical denomination within the registered designation of origin Alsace AOC.

== History ==
The village was first mentioned in 1059, in Latin in the ordnance survey of Heinrich IV. The area rose to prominence in the 13th century when a number of castles were built. Many such as Château du Birkenfels stand but are in ruins today. Château du Birkenfels was built by Burkhard Berger, a vassal of the bishop of Strasbourg. The castle's position allowed surveillance of the old Roman road running from Mont Sainte-Odile to Champ du Feu and the valley of the Bruche.

The castle belonged to the Berger family who ruled Ottrott until 1532, then power fell to the Mundolsheim family until the French Revolution. The castle fell into ruins after the Thirty Years' War and was taken over by the town of Obernai, becoming part of the continuous forest between Obernai and Bernardswiller.

== Demographic evolution ==
Historical population
Year	Pop.	±% p.a.
1968	1,074	—
1975	1,115	+0.54%
1982	1,303	+2.25%
1990	1,501	+1.78%
1999	1,513	+0.09%
2007	1,636	+0.98%
2012	1,589	−0.58%
2017	1,546	−0.55%
2023	1,620	+0.78%
Source: INSEE

== Geography ==
=== Neighboring communes ===
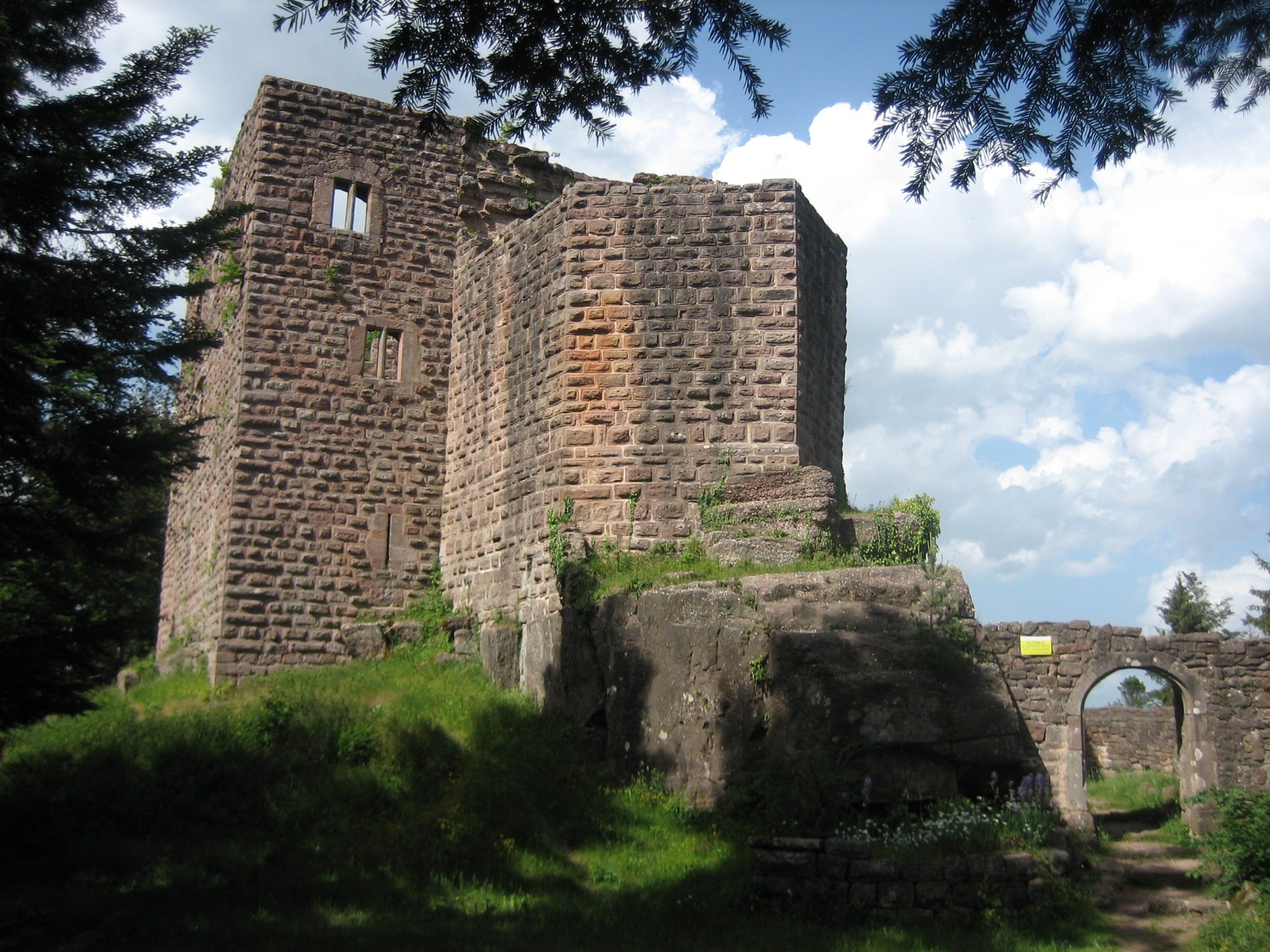
Ruins of the Château du Birkenfels

- Bœrsch
- Saint-Nabor
- Neuviller-la-Roche
- Barr
- Le Hohwald
- Bernardswiller
- Obernai

== Landmarks ==
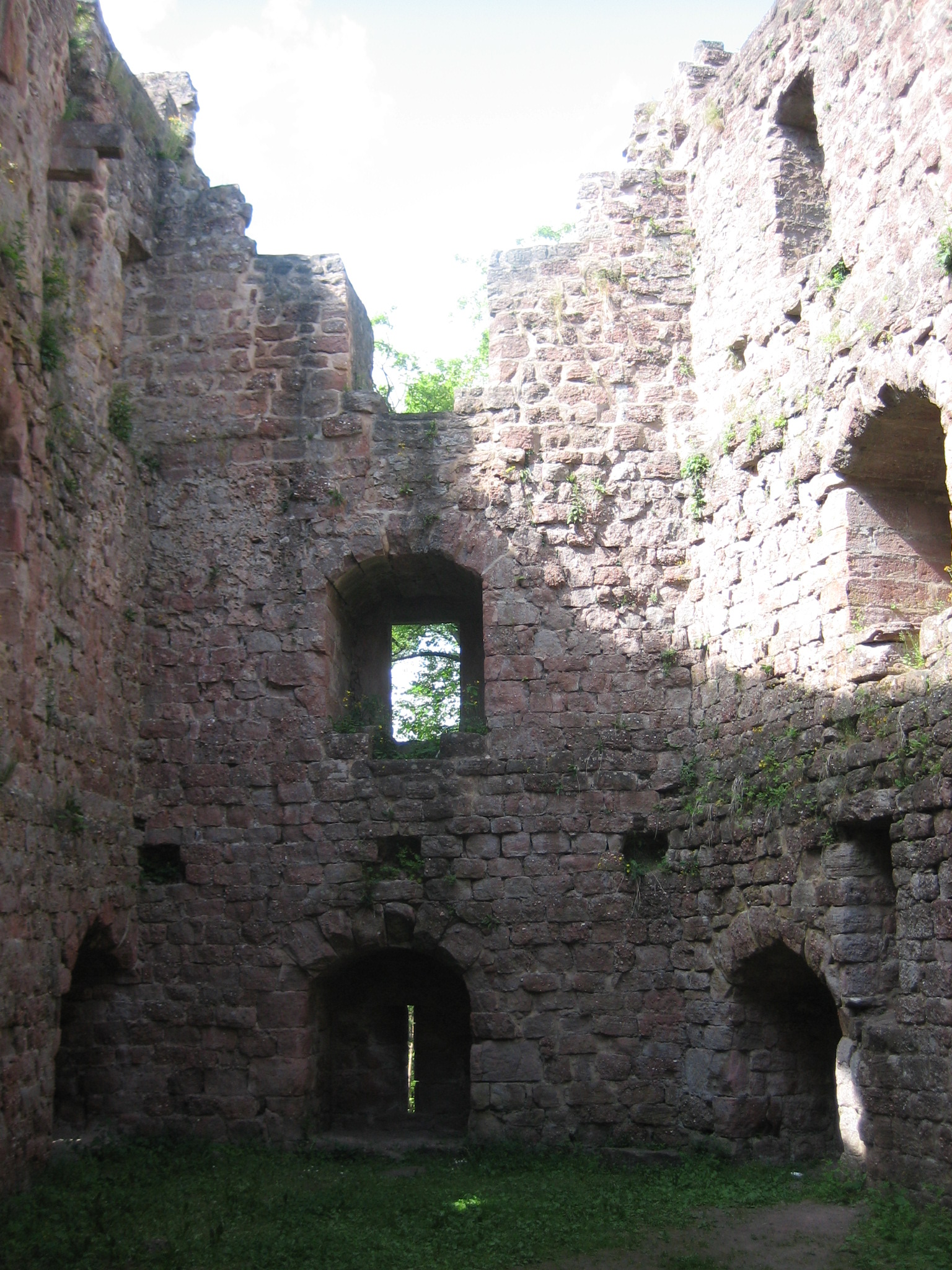
Château du Birkenfels

- Château du Birkenfels, (13th century)
- Château de Dreistein, (13th century)
- Château du Hagelschloss, (13th century)
- Château de Kagenfels, (13th century)
- Château de Koepfel
- Château de Lutzelbourg, (13th century)
- Château de Rathsamhausen, (13th century - (15th century)
- Château de Windeck, (13th century - (14th century)
- Chapelle Saint Nicolas (17th century)
- Église Saints Simon et Jude, Built 1771.
- Mont Sainte-Odile

== See also ==
- Communes of the Bas-Rhin department
