= Château du Hagelschloss =

Ruined castle in Bas-Rhin, Grand Est, France

Coordinates: 48°26′58″N 7°23′22″E

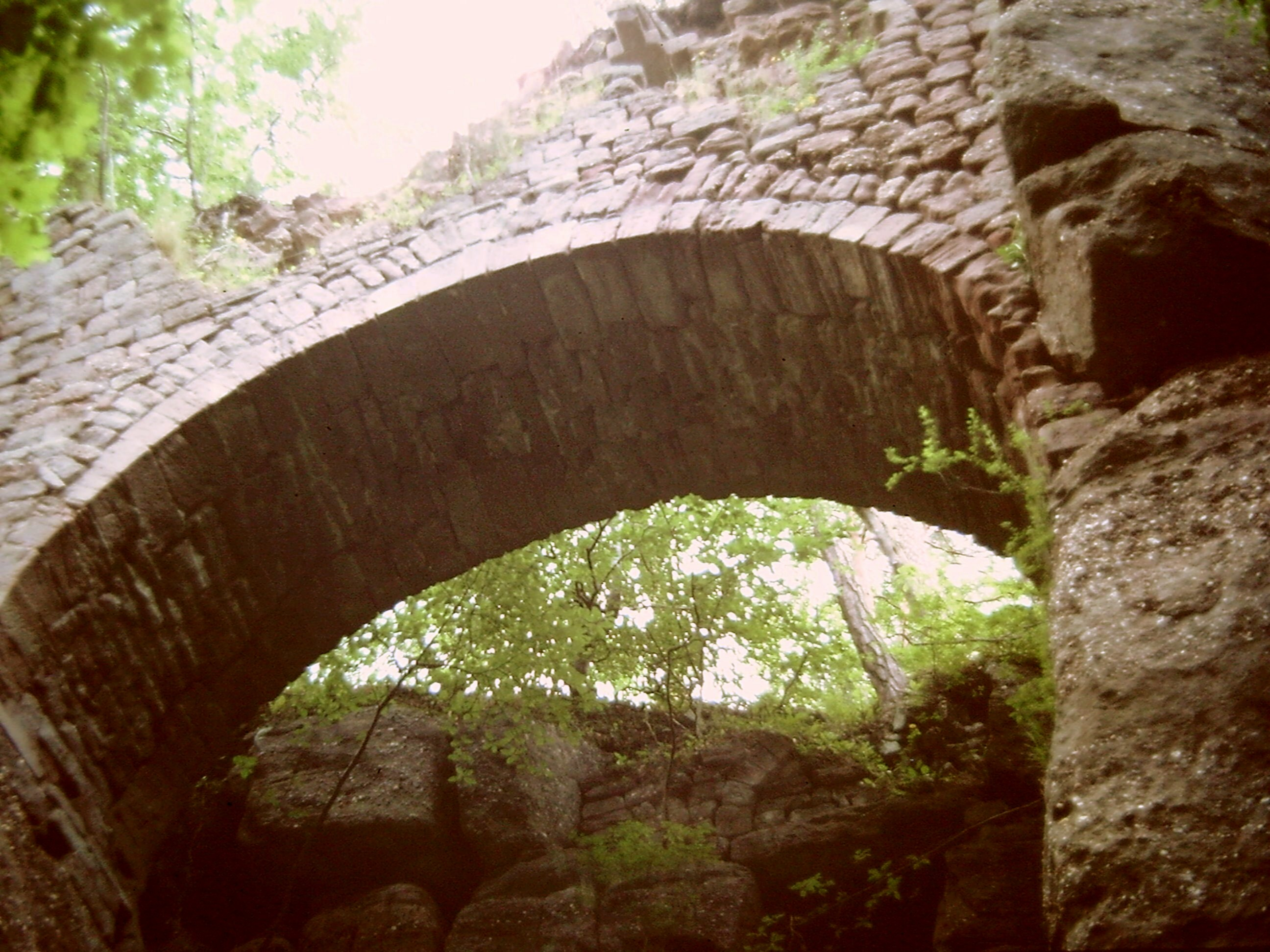
Ruins of Hagelschloss Castle

The Château du Hagelschloss (also known as Château de Waldsberg) is a ruined castle in the commune of Ottrott in the Bas-Rhin département of France. It was constructed in the 13th century.

Hagelschloss is probably named because of its position dominating the Hagelthal valley. In the 19th century, it was known as Waldberg and is mentioned as such in certain historic documents.

The castle appears on the French Ministry of Culture database and is described as being in a poor state, but has no official protection as a monument historique.

== Position ==
The castle is situated on the Hohenburgberg facing and to the north of Mont Sainte-Odile. It is close to The Pagan Wall of Mont-Sainte-Odile, and certain stones from the castle seem to have been borrowed from this wall.

The castle can only be reached on foot, using footpaths provided by the Club vosgien.

== See also ==
- List of castles in France

== Bibliography ==
- Christophe Carmona et Guy Trendel, Les Châteaux des Vosges, vol 2., Editions Pierron
