= Champ du Feu =

Peak in the Vosges Mountains

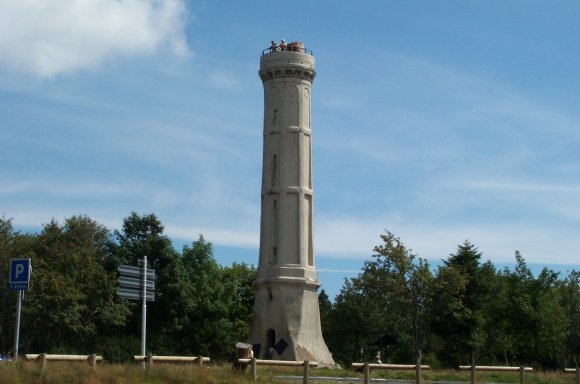
- Tower of Champ du Feu.

Highest point
- Elevation: 1,098 m (3,602 ft)
- Coordinates: 48°23′40″N 7°16′09″E

Geography
- Location within France
- Location: Alsace, France
- Parent range: Vosges Mountains

The Champ du Feu (French pronunciation: [ʃɑ̃ dy fø]) is the highest point in the Bas-Rhin, located at Ban de la Roche, at an altitude of 1,098 meters. In winter, the area is suitable for cross-country skiing and alpine skiing.

== Geography ==
The summit is accessible via the D214, which connects the Col d'Urbeis to Klingenthal. It is also crossed by the GR 5 and GR 531.

It is the highest point of the municipalities of Bellefosse, Belmont, and Hohwald.

The subsoil is composed of granite and is characterized by alpine grassland vegetation as well as peat bogs.

== History ==
A Roman road leading from the Alsace plain and passing by the current abbey of Hohenbourg on Mont Sainte-Odile is mentioned in 1059 by Strata in connection with the Champ du Feu. Its recognizable route, partly defined by its sunken path, ran along the ridge to the Col de Steige via the Col de la Charbonnière. It is referenced in 1382 as Rottenwegescheide (literally: 'the red path that separates') because it locally marked the boundary between the territory of the city of Obernai and the lordship of Ban de la Roche. A 16th-century boundary stone featuring the coats of arms of Obernai and Rathsamhausen is still located near the Col de la Rothlach.

== Winter Sports ==
Champ du Feu offers opportunities for cross-country skiing and alpine skiing. It is home to the only ski resort in the Bas-Rhin. Opened in 1959, it features numerous cross-country ski trails and 13 alpine ski runs. The resort also has 9 ski lifts and lighting on some of the trails. Additionally, there is a snowpark and several sledding areas.

== See also ==
- Vosges Mountains
- List of ski areas and resorts in Europe
