= Klingenthal, Bas-Rhin =

Ski resort and musical instrument manufacturing centre

Coordinates: 48°28′12″N 7°24′40″E

For the ski resort and manufacturing center of musical instruments in Germany, see Klingenthal Vogtlandkreis

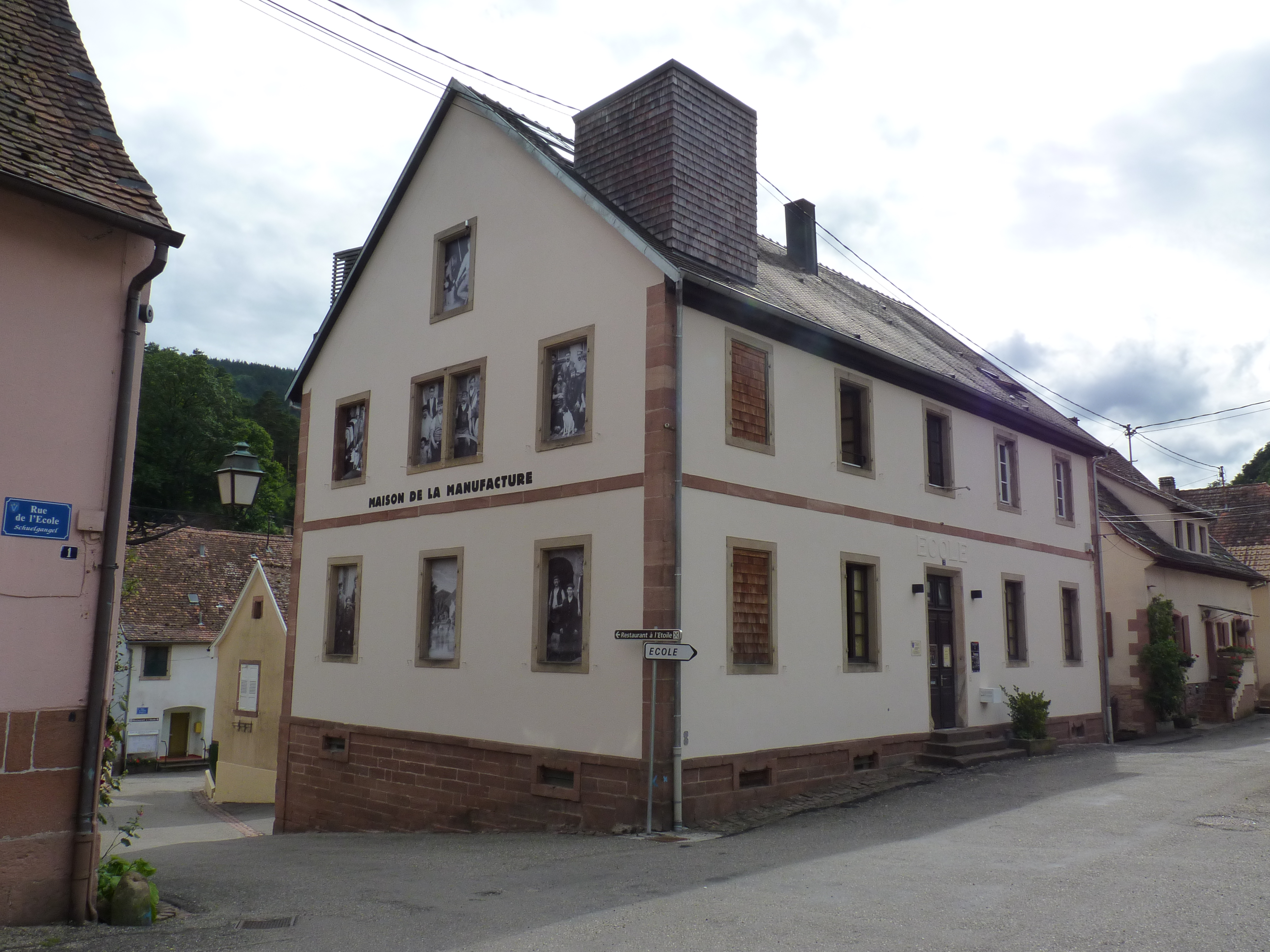
Former royal manufactory of Klingenthal bladed weapons now a museum

Klingenthal (French pronunciation: [kliŋ(ɡ)əntal]) is a village in the Bas-Rhin department of France, in the historic region of Alsace, and is situated on the communes of Boersch and Ottrott. Klingenthal, meaning "Blade Valley" or "The Valley of Blades" in Alsatian and German, was host to a large manufacturer of various types of edged weapons and metal armour during the 18th and 19th centuries.

Klingenthal was the first Royal Weapons Manufactory in France, and was largely inspired by methods pioneered in Solingen, another major sword-producing town in western Germany. The Solingen Manufactory was the first to develop an infrastructure for the mass-production of weapons, and at the beginning of 18th century was outfitting many of the European armies including the French Royal Army. Under the reign of Louis XV, acknowledging the critical dependency on foreign imports to equip the army, French authorities decided to mimic the organization that had succeeded in Solingen by creating their own national blade manufacturing centre. The site at Klingenthal was preferable due to the local presence of iron ore, and sandstone which was used primarily in the grinders for honing and sharpening the blades. The site's proximity to the Vosges mountains allowed for easy access to mountain streams, for the purposes of hydraulic power. Craftsmen were hired from Solingen in order to import the manufacturing process, communication with whom was aided by the local dialect, which was close to their native German.

The manufactory, named the 'Manufacture Royale d'Armes Blanches d'Alsace', was opened in 1730, under the direction of Henri Anthès, and the basic pattern of the factory would later be used in at other sites such as Saint-Etienne. The original site contained a forging hammer, grinding and honing equipment, along with a number of workshops, and accommodation for the workers. Initially the blades produced there were signed: "Manufacture Royale d’Alsace", but were later signed: "Klingenthal." The 'Royal Manufactory' was renamed the 'National Manufactory' (Manufacture Nationale d'Armes Blanches) in 1792, following the French Revolution, and then renamed the 'Imperial Manufactory' (Manufacture Impériale d'Armes Blanches) under Napoleon I in 1804. The manufactory was finally returned to its original title of 'Royal Manufactory' upon the Bourbon Restoration in 1815. After the Restoration, French officials started considering the fact that the manufactory was too close to the German border for such a strategic asset, and so Weapons production was gradually resettled to Manufacture d'armes de Châtellerault, founded in 1819 in the Western Center of France. In 1838 Klingenthal ended weapons manufacturing, lost the Royal Manufactory status, and became a privately owned company producing civilian goods under the "Coulaux" name. The company continued producing agricultural tools, notably scythes, until production ceased in 1962.

A museum opened in 2007, housed in one of the former factory buildings, displaying tools and a significant collection of swords.

== In fiction ==
A Klingenthal heavy cavalry sword plays an important role in the plot of Bernard Cornwell's historical novel Sharpe's Sword.
