= Castle of Ottrott =

Medieval castle ruin in Bas-Rhin, France

Coordinates: 48°27′41″N 7°24′29″E

The Castles of Ottrott is a medieval castle ruin, above the town of Ottrott, in the Bas-Rhin department of eastern France (Alsace). The site contains the remains of two neighbouring castles that were separated by a moat: Lutzelbourg (also: Vorderlutzelbourg) and Rathsamhausen (also: Hinterlutzelbourg).

== History ==
The castles of Ottrott were built on the plateau of Elsberg about 500 metres above the surrounding land. Two ruins, separated by barely fifty metres, now stand here: the "Rathsamhausen" on the west of the site and the "Lutzelbourg" in the east.

Recent excavations uncovered the foundations of a primitive castle between the current ruins of the castles. This primitive castle, named Old Lutzelbourg, was most certainly built before 1076 on the initiative of the counts of Eguisheim solicitors of Hohenbourg's monastery (Sainte-Odile) located some kilometres away.

This first structure was destroyed by the Hohenstaufens at the beginning of the 12th century but was immediately raised again by them to be finally enfeoffed to Conrad de Lutzelbourg in 1196. In 1198, it was destroyed by arson by the Eguisheim-Dabos.

The construction of the new castle, known in the middle of the 16th century as "Rathsamhausen", was begun by the beginning of the 13th under Otto of Burgundy who had decided to take back control of the region.

The works must have ended after 1220, the Lutzelbourg being always present on the scene, because in 1230 Elisabeth de Lutzelbourg was appointed abbess of the monastery of Hohenbourg. By the middle of the 13th century, the castle presently called "Lutzelbourg" was built just below "Rathsamhausen".

Visitors to the site notice that the defences of "old Lutzelbourg" are turned towards its neighbour, always in the hands of the Hohenstaufen. Historians suppose that it was built on the initiative of the Bishop of Strasbourg, Henri de Stahleck, to gain control of the imperial possessions.

During the works, the defenders of "Rathsamhausen" were not idle and built an impressive keep facing its neighbour.

By the end of the 13th century, the Hohenstaufen had already lost all their influence on the Empire and some kind of agreement was probably found between Rudolph of Habsburg and the episcopal party. In 1392, "Lutzelbourg" was enfeoffed to the counts of Andlau who ceded their rights the following year to the Rathsamhausen-Ehenweiers already in possession of the nearby castle. They undertook to reconstruct both at the beginning of the 15th century.

"Old Lutzelbourg" was again destroyed between 1470 and 1570, probably in 1525 during the War of the Boorish, whereas "Rathsamhausen" was successively enfeoffed in 1424 to Henri de Hohenstein and then to his son-in-law, Daniel de Mullenheim.

Important Renaissance style renovation works were begun by the Mullenheims between 1520 and 1530. Conrad de Rathsamhausen finally bought back the castle by 1557 from Caspar de Mullenheim.

It has since been known as "Rathsamhausen", the name it has today. The castle was plundered and ruined during the Thirty Years' War.

The castles of Ottrott are nowadays private property. They have been listed as Monuments historiques since 1985.

== See also ==
- List of castles in France
