= Château de Lutzelbourg =

Château in Moselle, France

Castle of Lutzelbourg
- Lutzelbourg in France
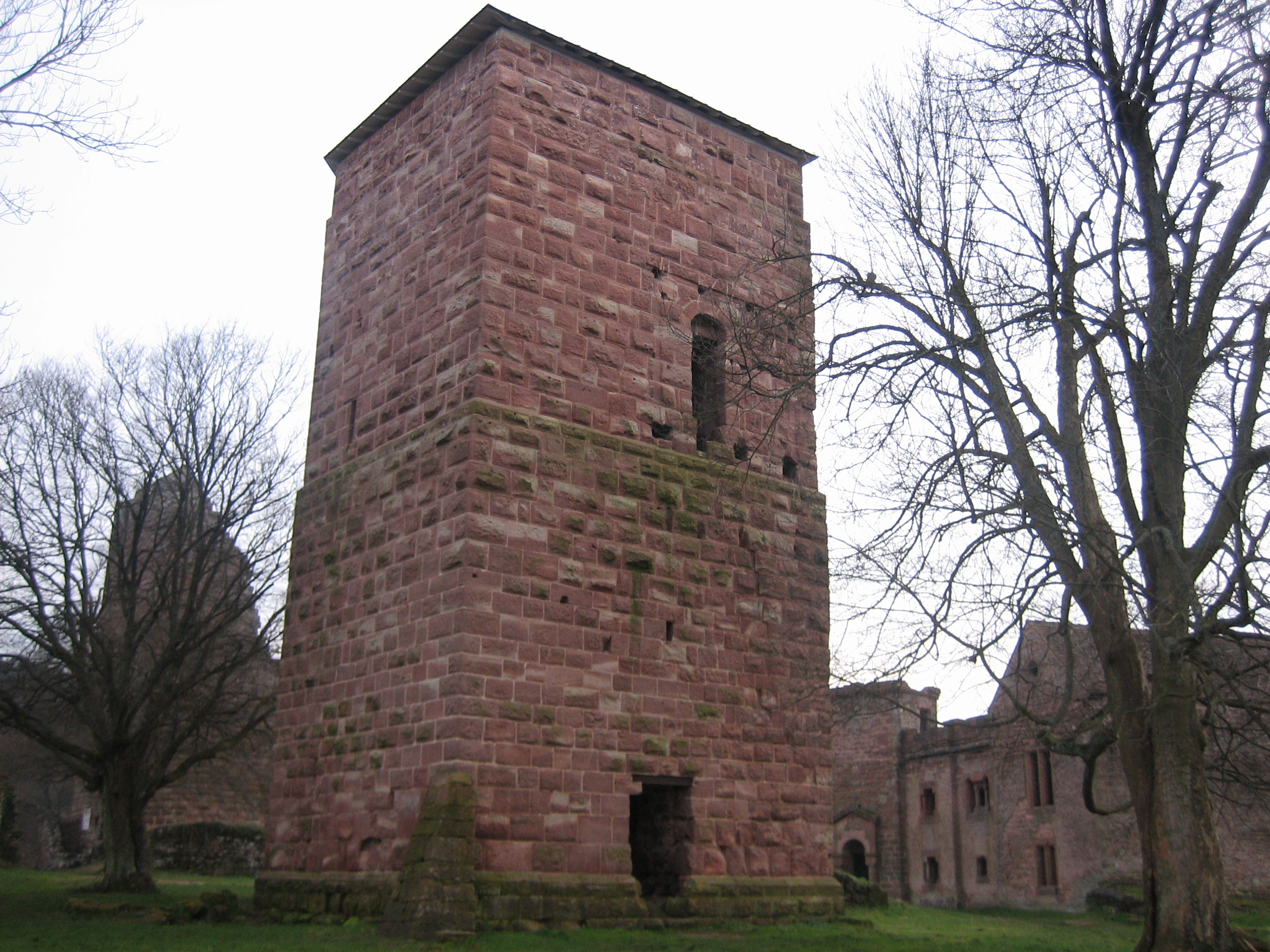

Site information
- Type: Castle

Location
- Coordinates: 48°43′57″N 7°15′14″E

Site history
- Built: XI^{e} siècle

The château du Lutzelbourg is a château founded by Pierre de Lutzelbourg in the 11th century on a rocky promontory overlooking the Zorn valley in France at an altitude of 322m, in Lutzelbourg (Moselle). It has been classified as a Historic Monument since February 1930 in France

== History ==
The history of the castle began with Pierre, the son of Count Frédéric de Montbéliard, who belonged to a noble lineage associated with the powerful House of Savoy. In December 1091, following the death of his grandmother, Marquise Adélaïde of Suse, Pierre became the rightful heir to the Magraviate of Suse in Italy. However, the title was also claimed by Henry IV, Holy Roman Emperor. As a result, Pierre was compelled to settle on his ancestral lands situated between Philippsbourg and the Zorn Valley. While there are limited sources that mention the name "Lutzelbourg" before the 12th century, it is derived from "lutzel Burg", meaning "small castle". The name "Lutzelbourg" first appeared in 1126 in the founding notice of the Convent of Saint Jean Saverne by Count Pierre de Lutzelbourg. Pierre adopted this name when he took possession of the site.

Around 1100, Pierre negotiated the exchange of the priory of Saint-Quirin with castel de Lutzelbourg at the abbey of Marmoutier in Alsace. Réginald, the only son of the union of Pierre and Ita, died a few days after Christmas 1142 leaving the county without descendants. It was Pierre's cousin Étienne, the Bishop of Metz, who received sovereignty around 1150 and gave custody of it to the first Lords of Lutzelbourg.

Two families had an important role in the history of the castle between the 13th and 14th centuries: the lords of Fénétrange and the Lutzelsteins shared possession of the estate and successively imposed their laws (toll duty in Lutzelbourg for example). They were ousted around 1450 by the Palatine Counts during the conquest of the castle.

In 1523, Louis the Pacific ordered the destruction of the castle of Lutzelbourg to stop the designs of Franz von Sickingen.

In 1840, the ruins of the castle were saved from demolition by Adolf Germain, a notary in Phalsbourg, when the owners wanted to sell the materials from the ruin to the companies that were building the railway line.

After several successive sales, Eugène Koeberlé, a teacher of medicine in Strasbourg, bought the site. Around 1900, he decided to consolidate the ruins, to undertake excavations and to build the neo-Romanesque room. In 1909, he published in Strasbourg his work, Les Ruines du château de Lutzelbourg, where he reported his discoveries and hypotheses.

== Architecture ==
The large square tower, built in the 12th century has a height of 24 meters and its walls are 2.40 meters thick. It was built by Count Pierre de Lutzelbourg and his son Reginald.

== Gallery ==
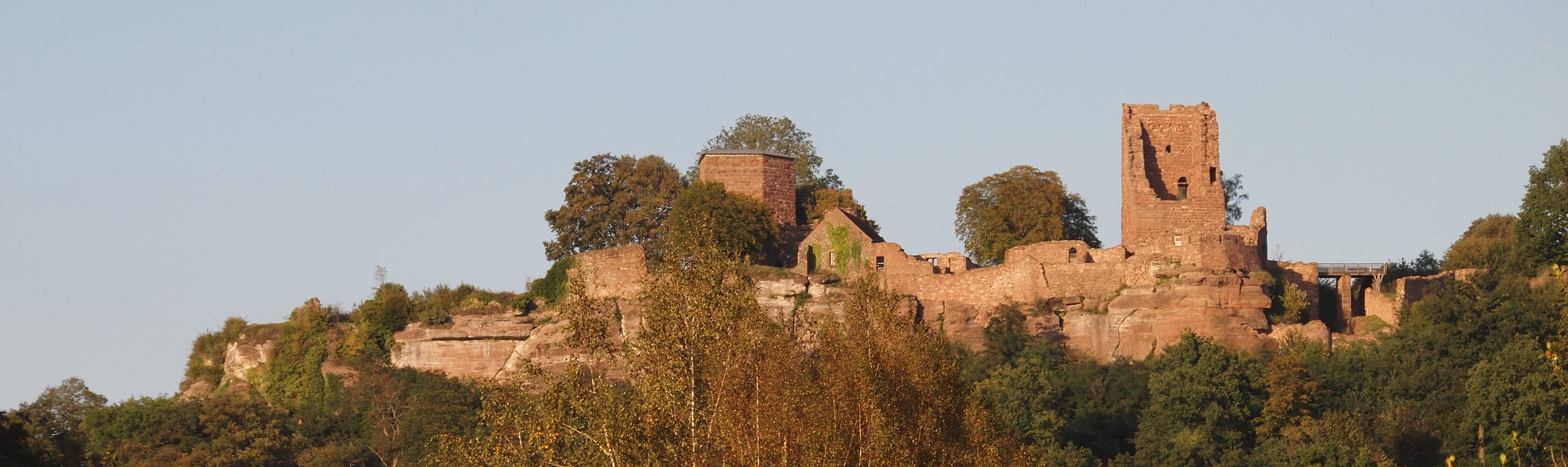
Panoramic view of the castle of Lutzelbourg

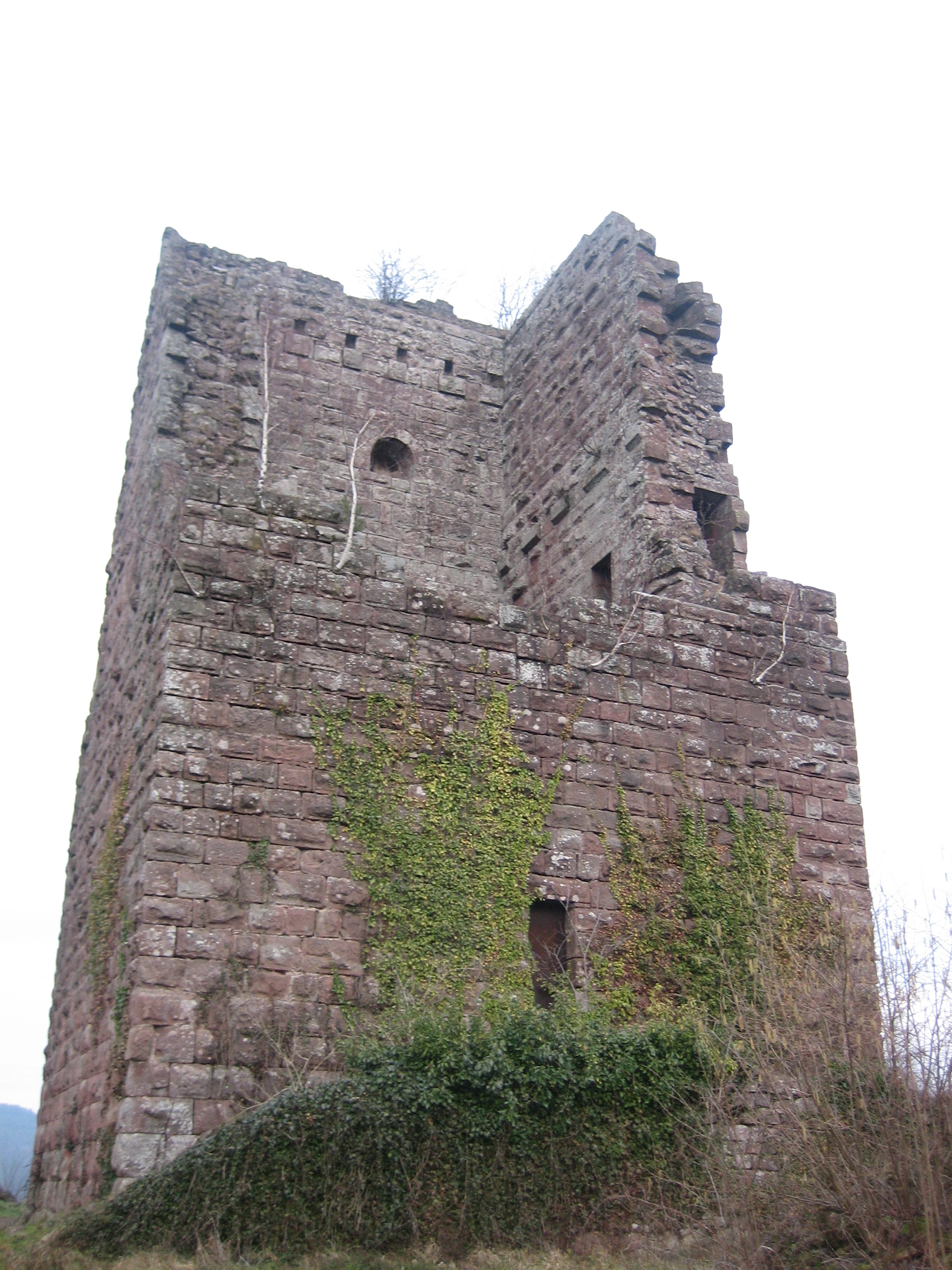
Large square tower

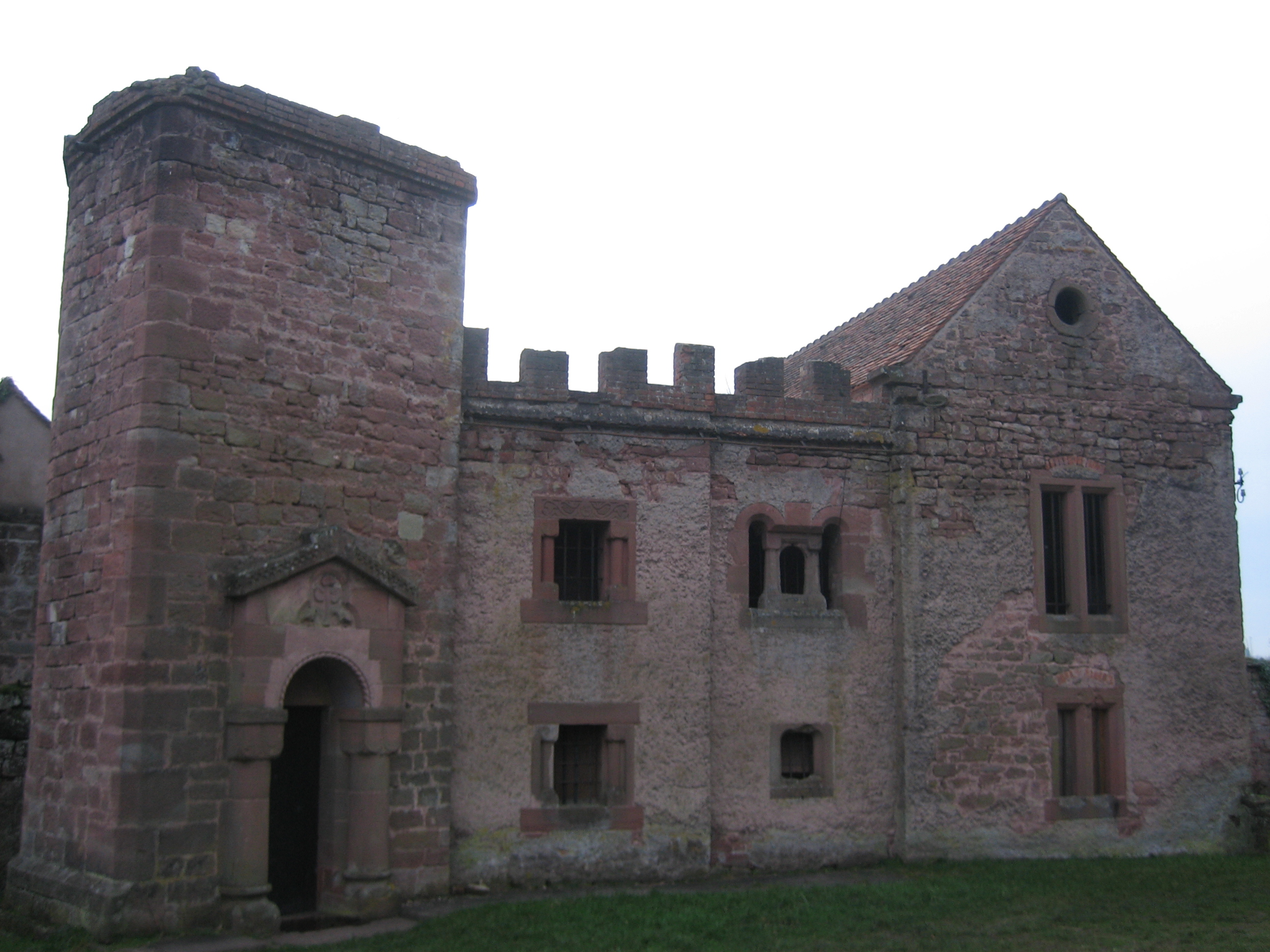
Front facade of the chapel

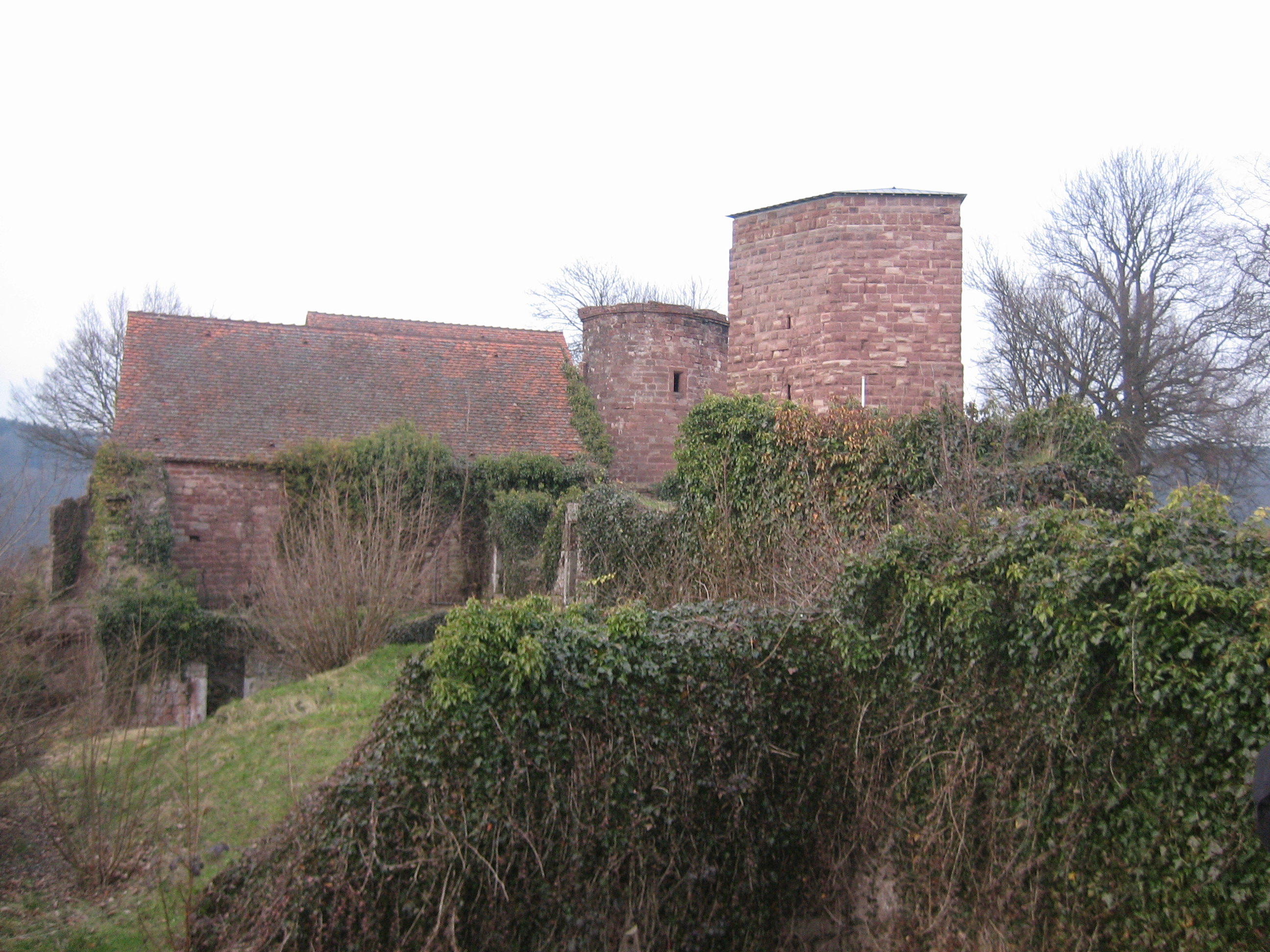
Chapel seen from behind

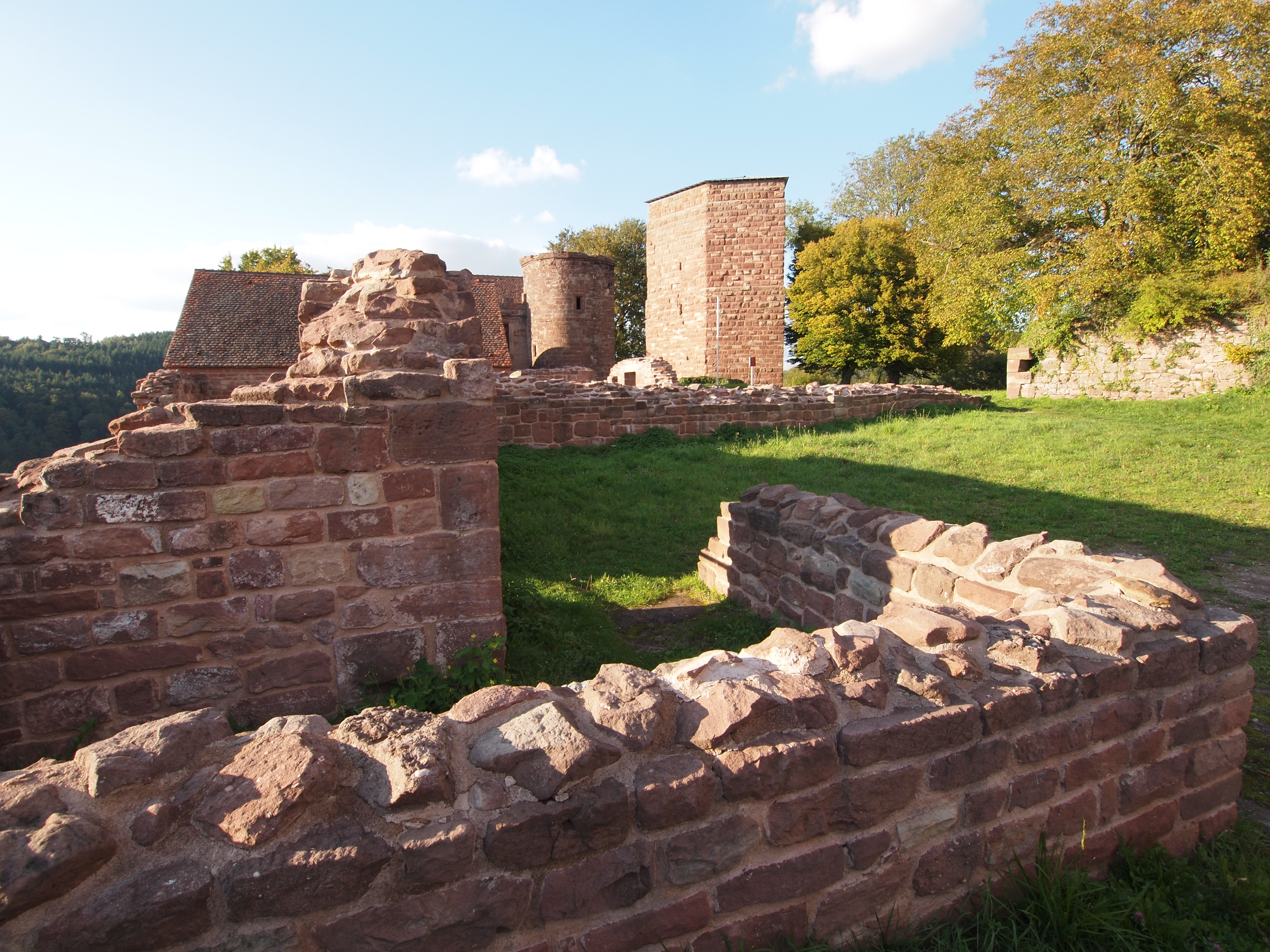

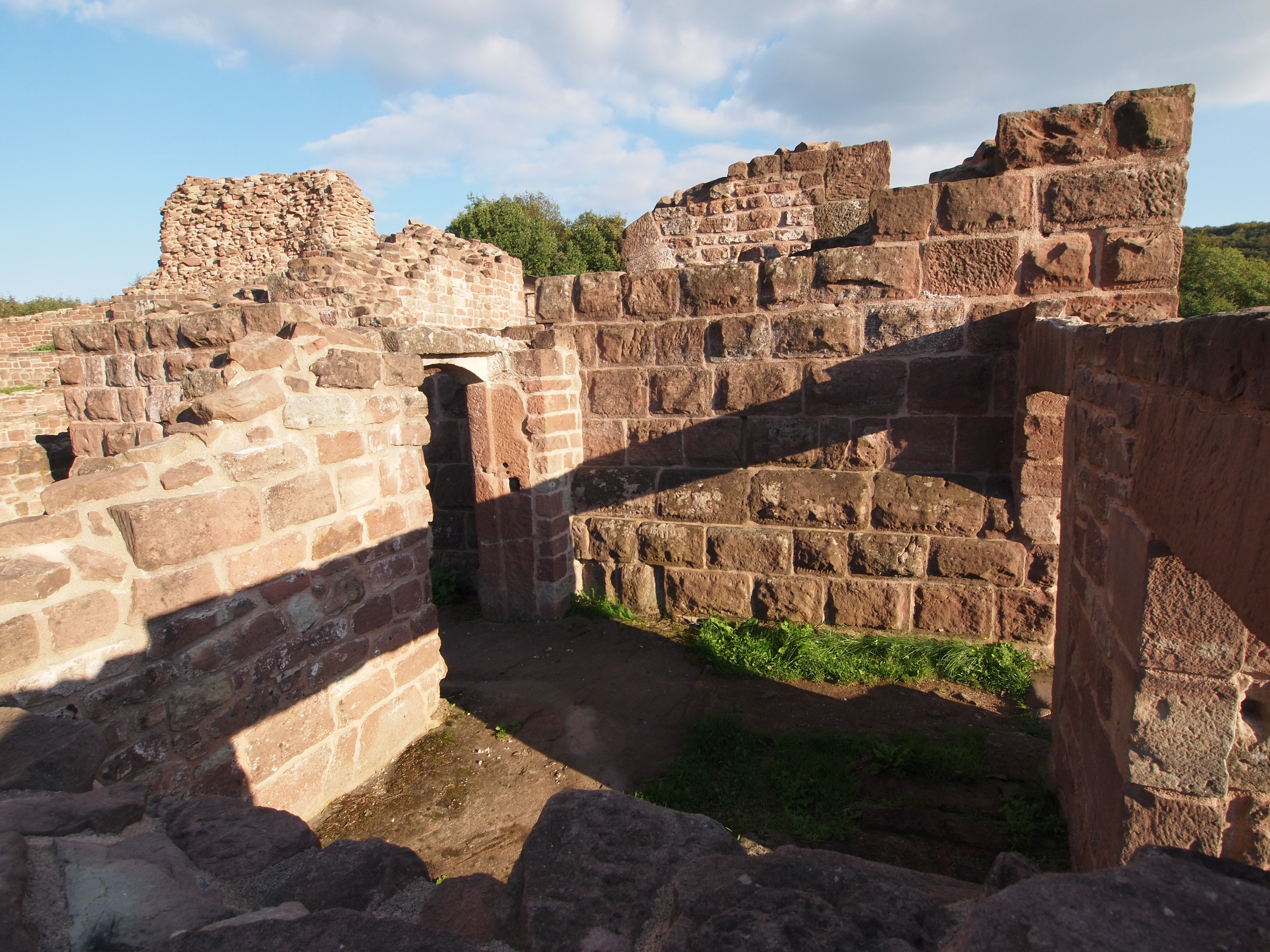

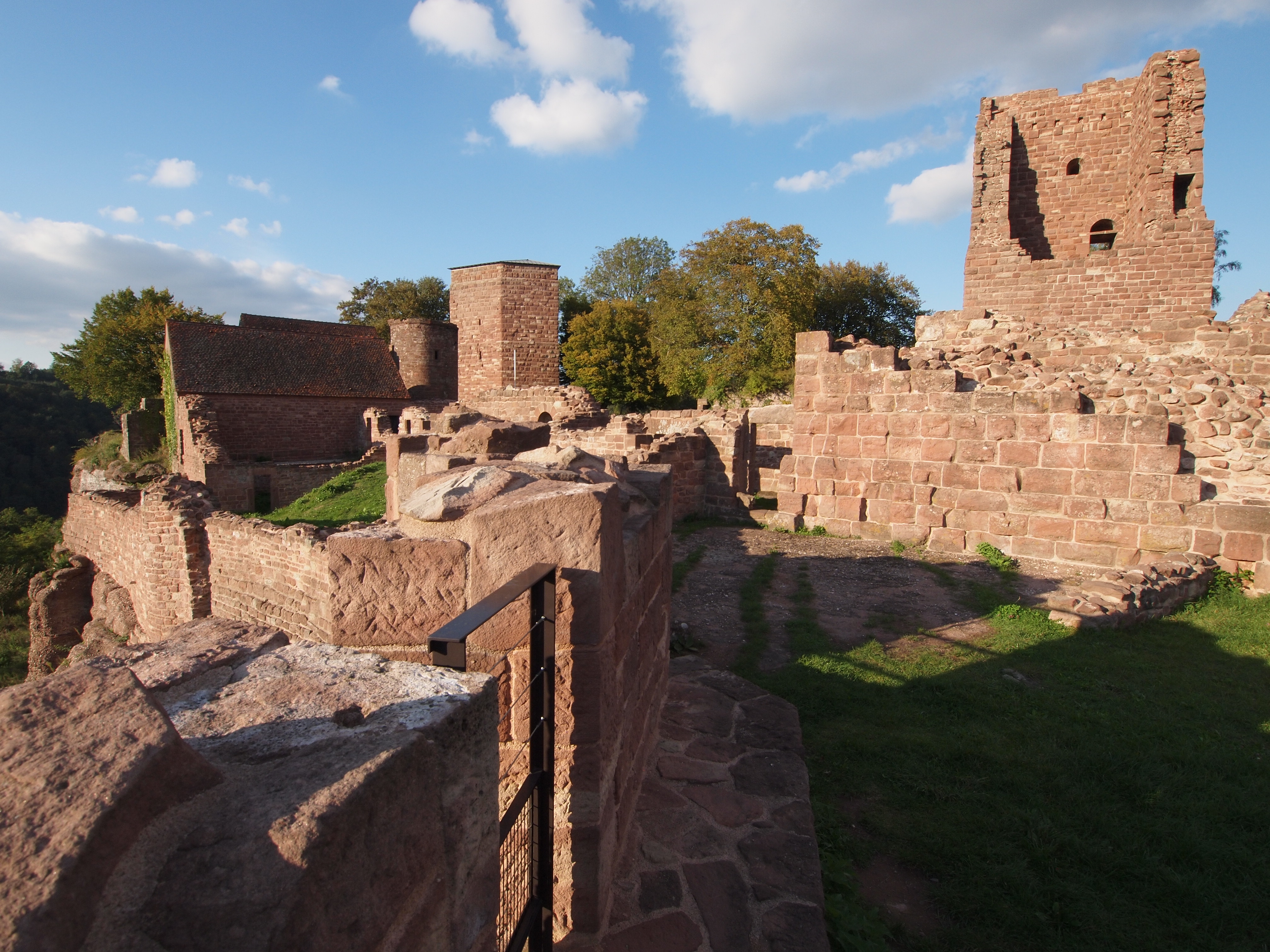

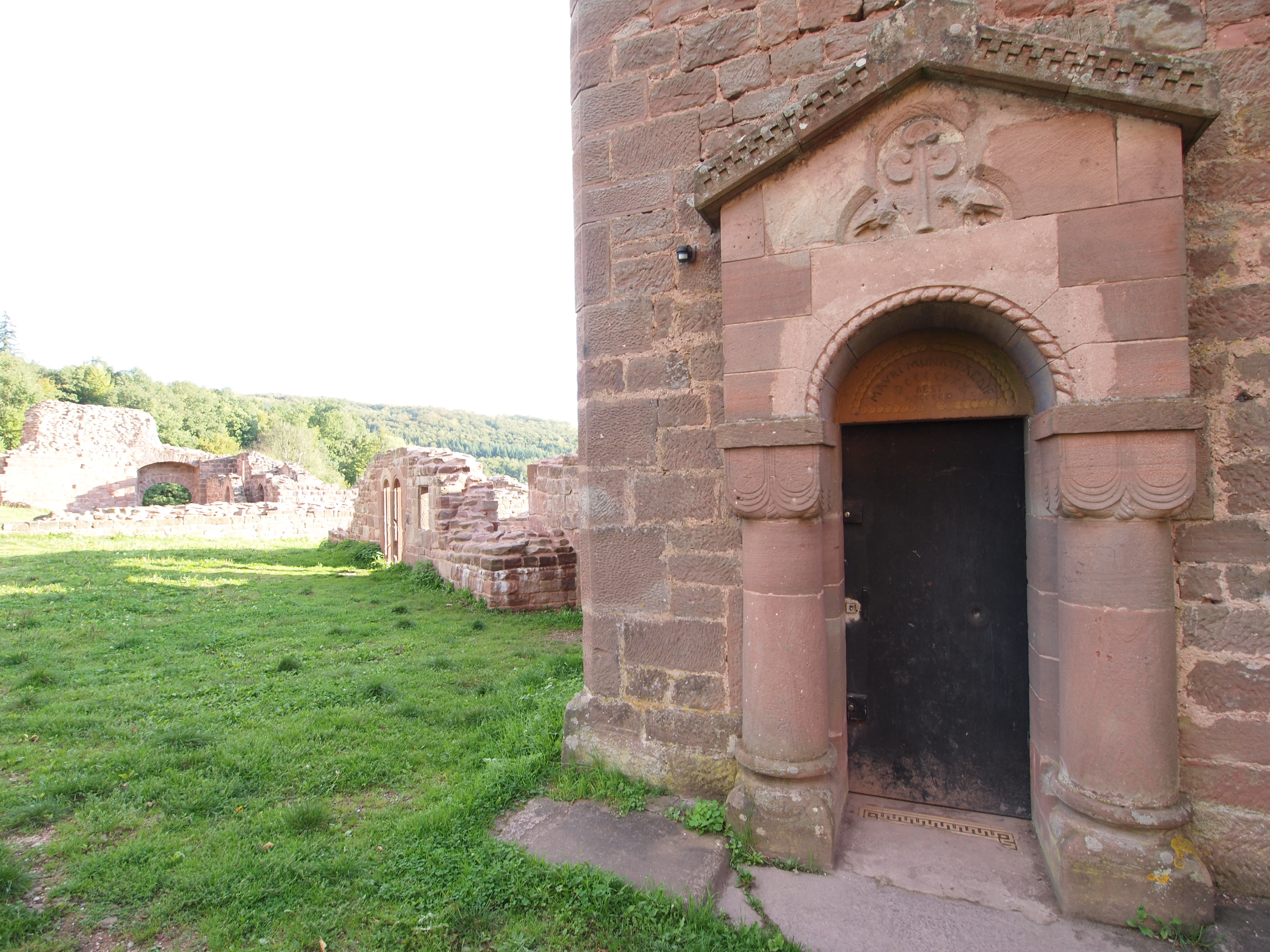

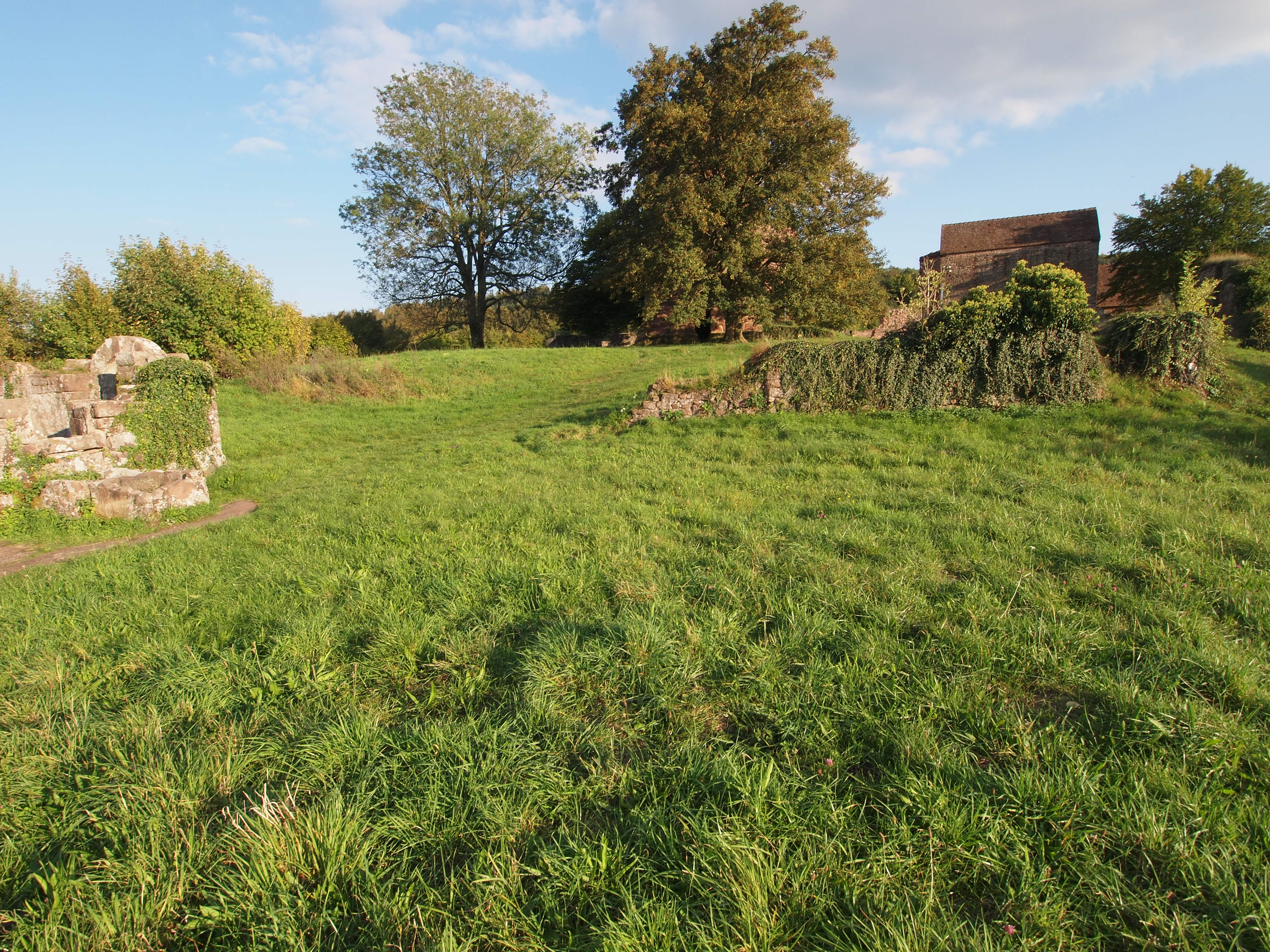

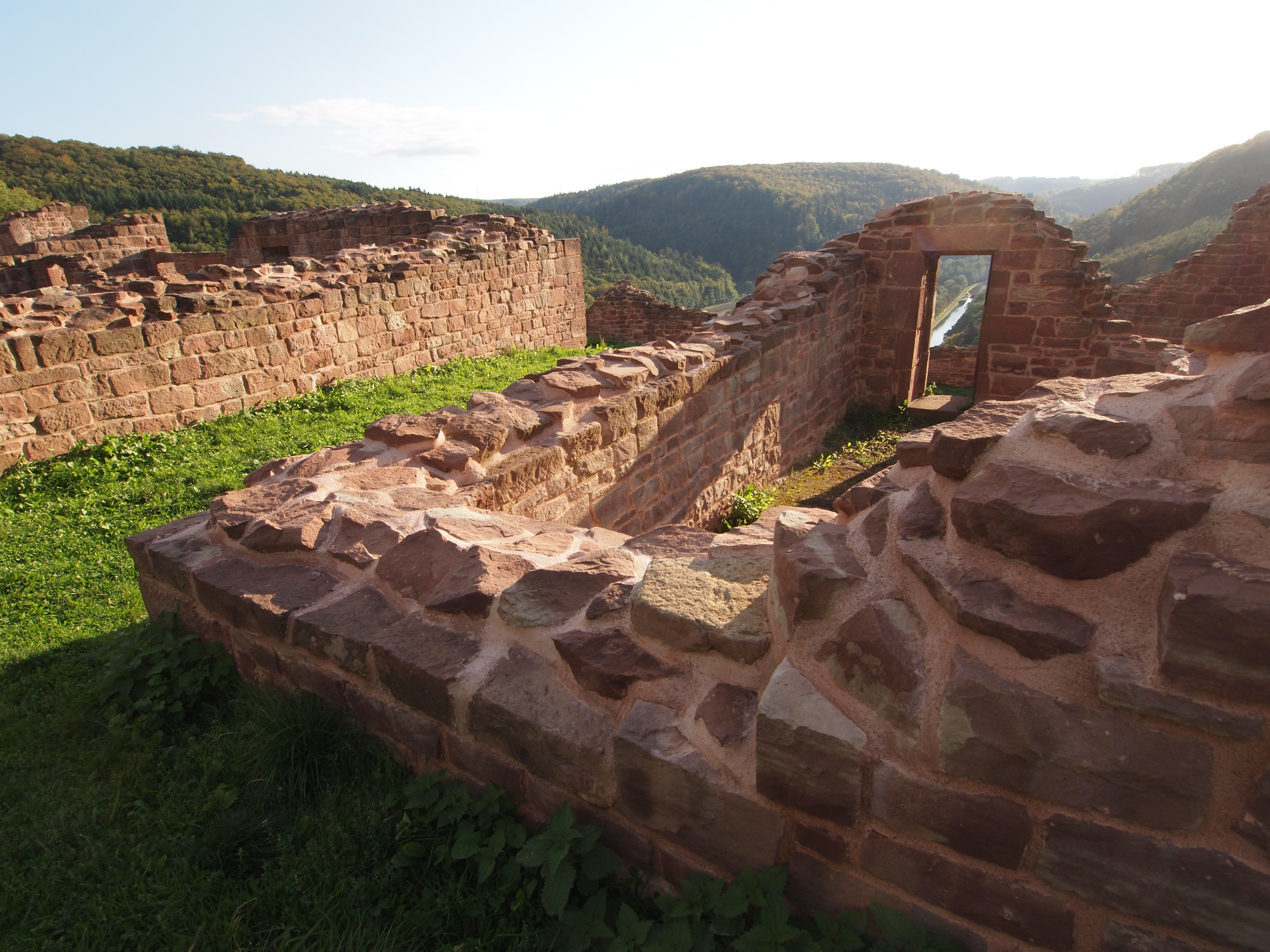

== See also ==
- Château de Hohbarr

== Bibliography ==
- Dagobert Fischer, Lutzelbourg, le château et le village, étude historique, Impr. de G. Crépin-Leblond 1871 (ASIN: B001C9HWJ0)
- Eugène Koeberlé, Les ruines du château de Lutzelbourg, Imprimerie alsacienne, Strasbourg 1909. (Une copie de son œuvre se trouve à la BNU Strasbourg.)
- Les ruines du château de Lutzelbourg (D’après un article paru dans les « Mémoires de la Société d’archéologie lorraine » – Année 1871)
