= Eugène Koeberlé =

French surgeon

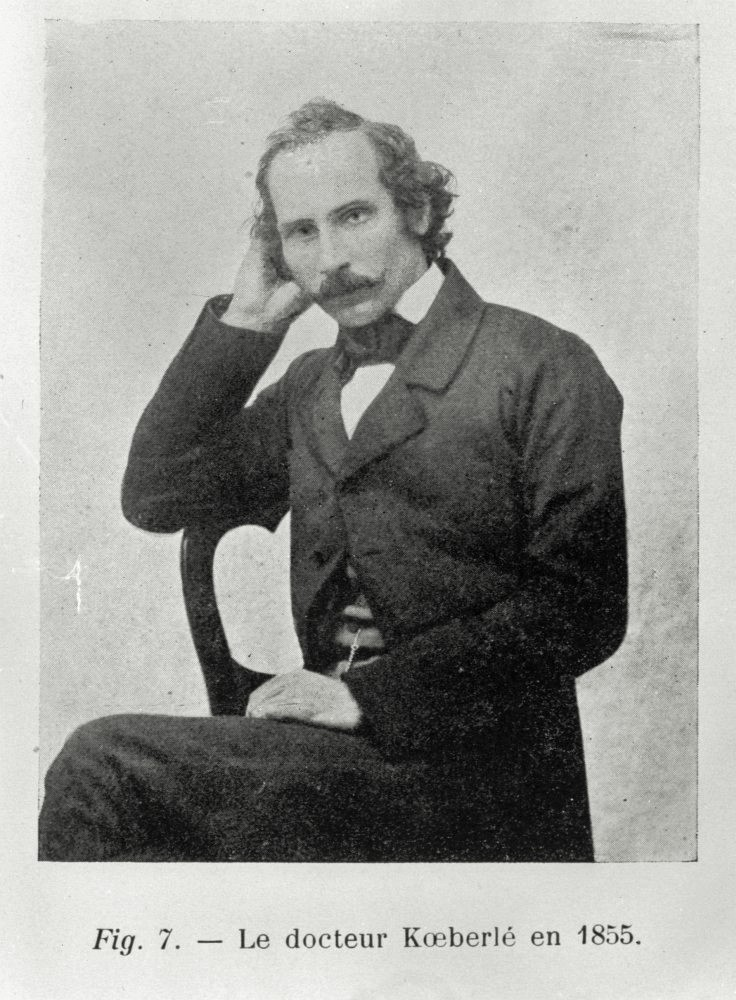
Eugène Koeberlé (1855)

Eugène Koeberlé (4 January 1828, Sélestat - 13 June 1915, Strasbourg) was a French and German surgeon to the Faculté de médecine in Strasbourg, earning his agrégation in 1853.

Koeberlé specialized in abdominal surgery, in particular pioneer work involving ovariotomy and hysterectomy operations. He is also credited for developing a precursor of present-day surgical hemostats

During the latter part of his career he devoted his energies to poetry and archaeology. The Lycée Docteur-Koeberlé in his hometown of Sélestat is named in his honour.

== Selected writings ==
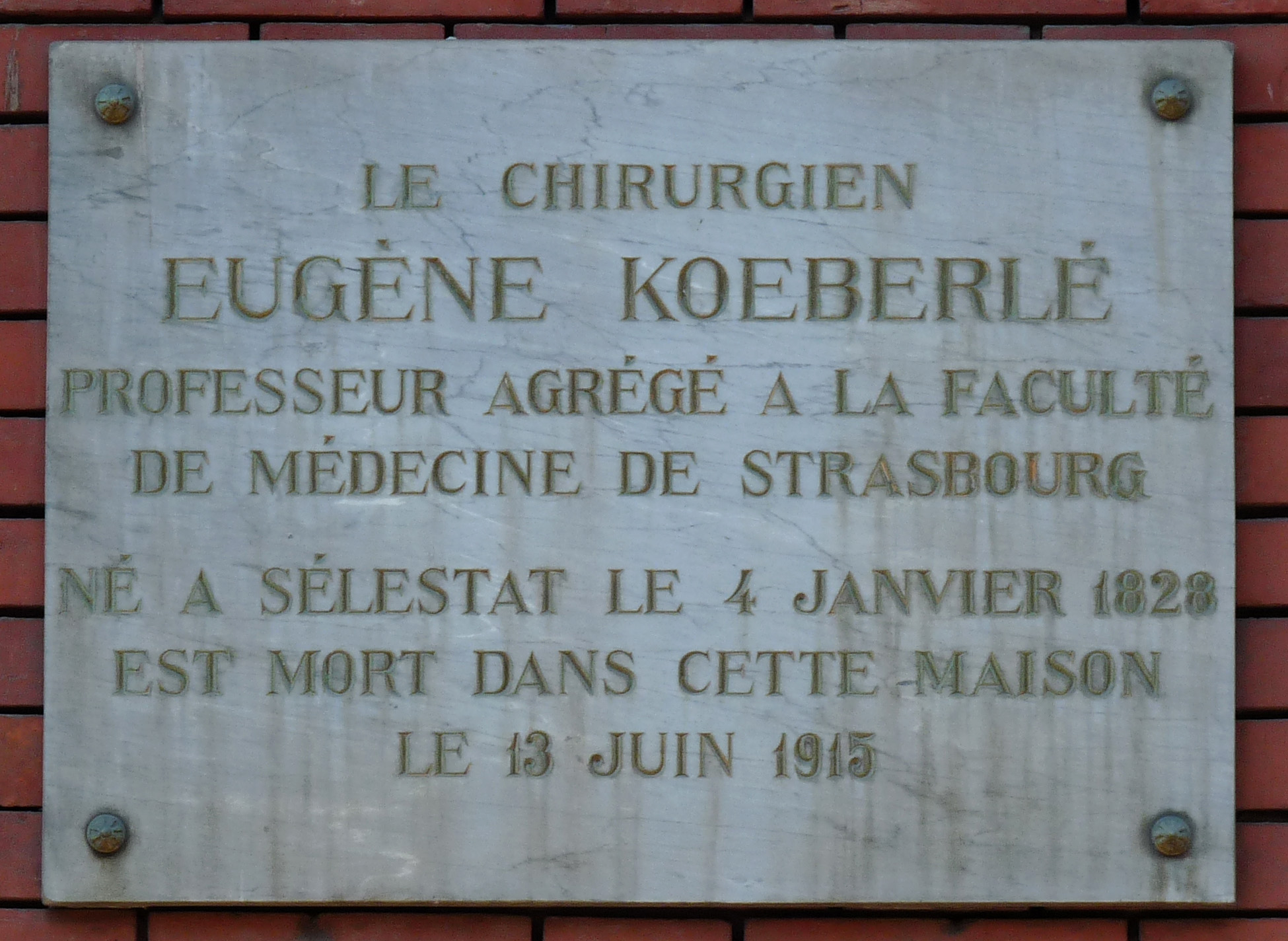
Commemorative plaque on the house in which he died

- Deuxième opération d'ovariotomie, deuxième succès: notice sur une ovariotomie, pratiquée, le 29 septembre 1862, 1862 - Second ovariotomy operation, second success: record on the ovariotomy- 29 September 1862.
- Opérations d'ovariotomie, 1865 - Ovariotomy operations.
- De l'ovariotomie, 1865 -
- Extirpation d'une tumeur fibrocystique de la matrice, du poids de 14 1/2 kilogrammes, guérison, 1869 - Removal of fibrocystic tumor, weight = 14.5 kilograms.
- Tumeur fibro-graisseuse du poids de 5 kilogr., développée à la partie interne de la cuisse, opération, guérison, 1869
- Des maladies des ovaires et de l'ovariotomie, 1878 - Maladies of the ovaries and ovariotomy.
- De l'Hémostase définitive par compression excessive, 1878 - On final hemostasis by excessive compression.
- Les habitants de l'Alsace ancienne et moderne, 1913 - Inhabitants of Alsace, ancient and modern.
