= Mont Sainte-Odile =

Mountain in France

- German: 'Odilienberg'
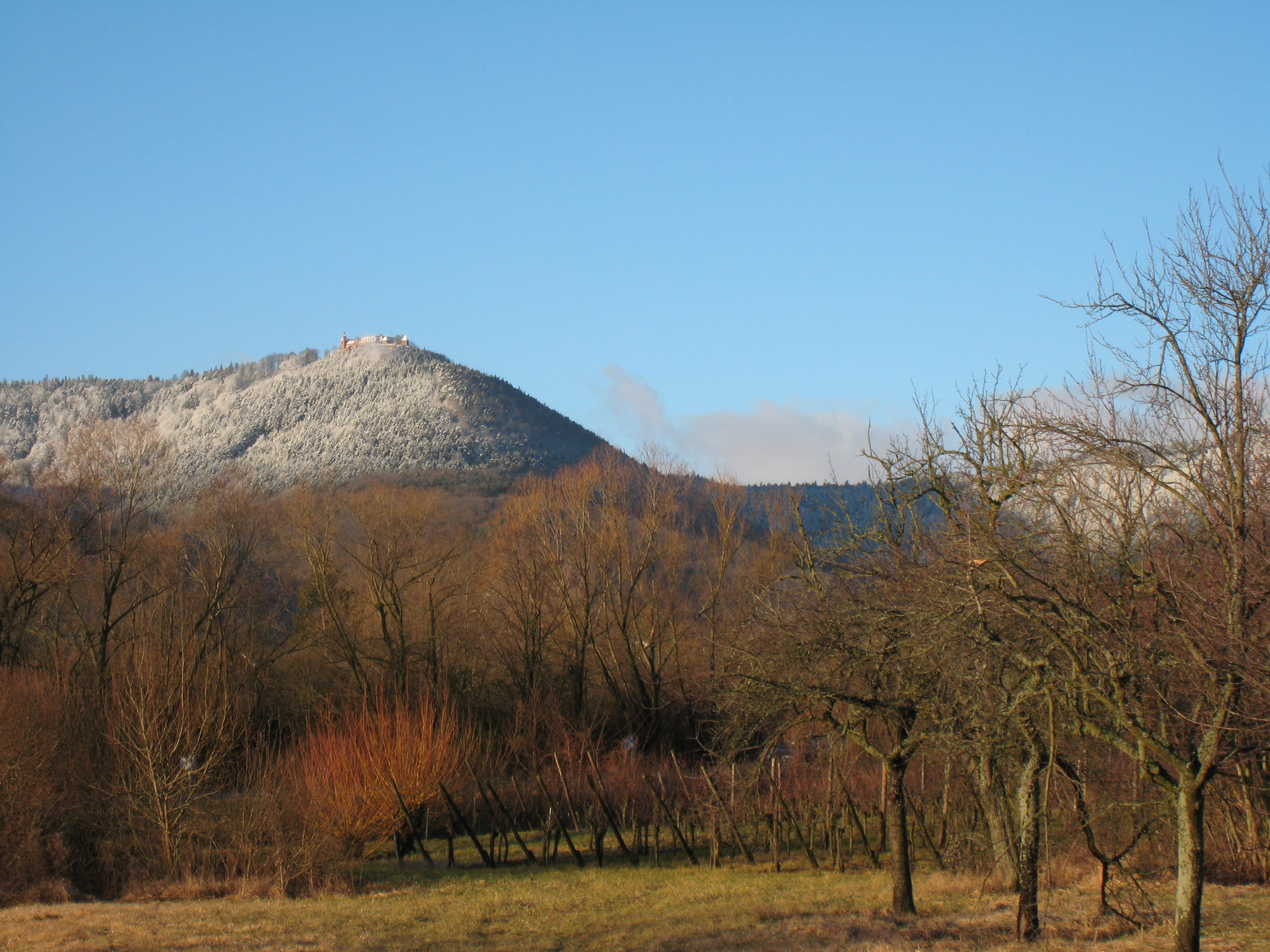
- Mont Sainte-Odile and the Monastery

Highest point
- Elevation: 764 m (2,507 ft)
- Coordinates: 48.4374580°N 7.4044908°E

Geography
- Location within France
- Location: Alsace, France
- Parent range: Vosges Mountains

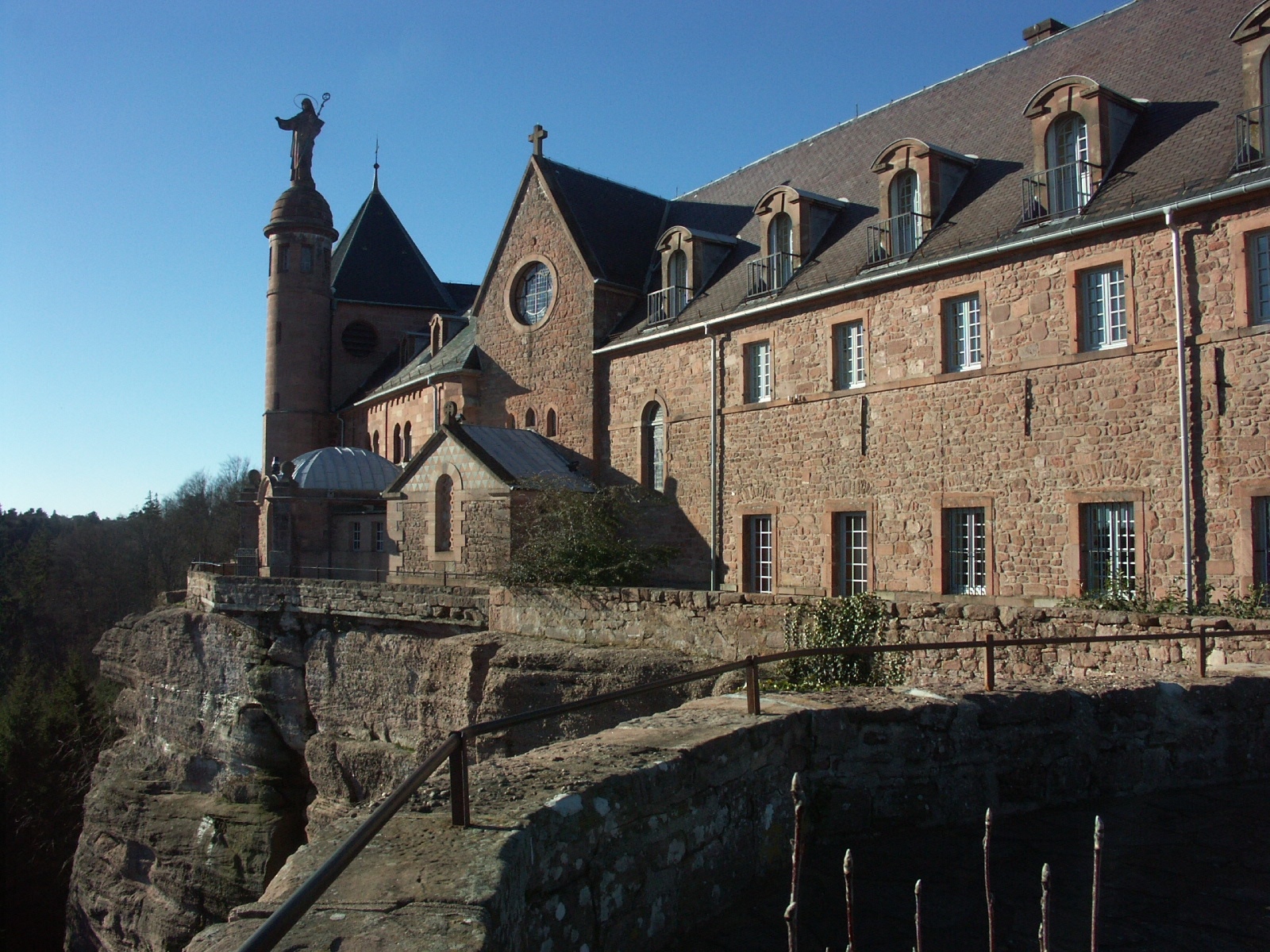
Monastery at Mont Sainte-Odile

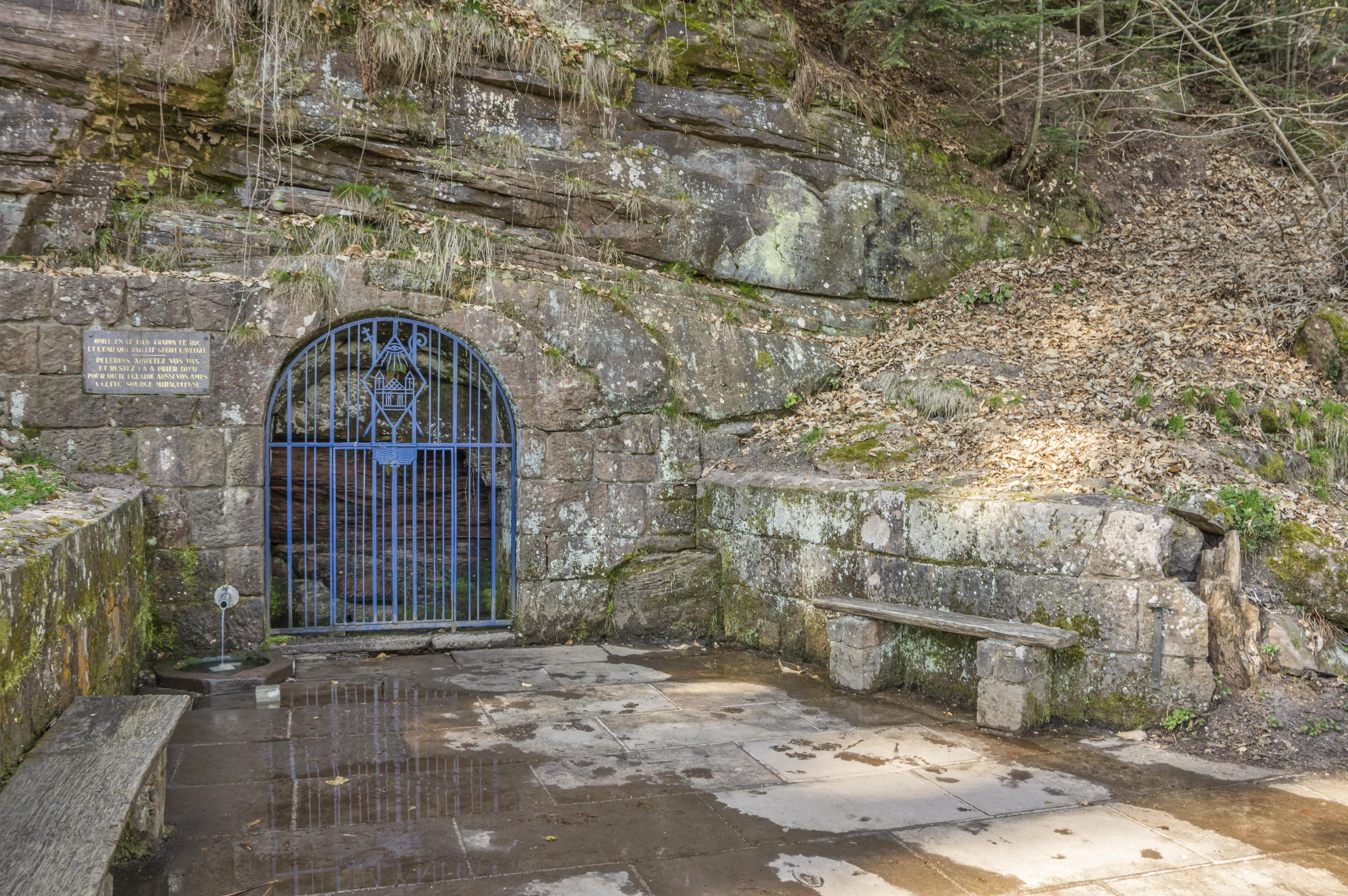
Fountain Sainte-Odile

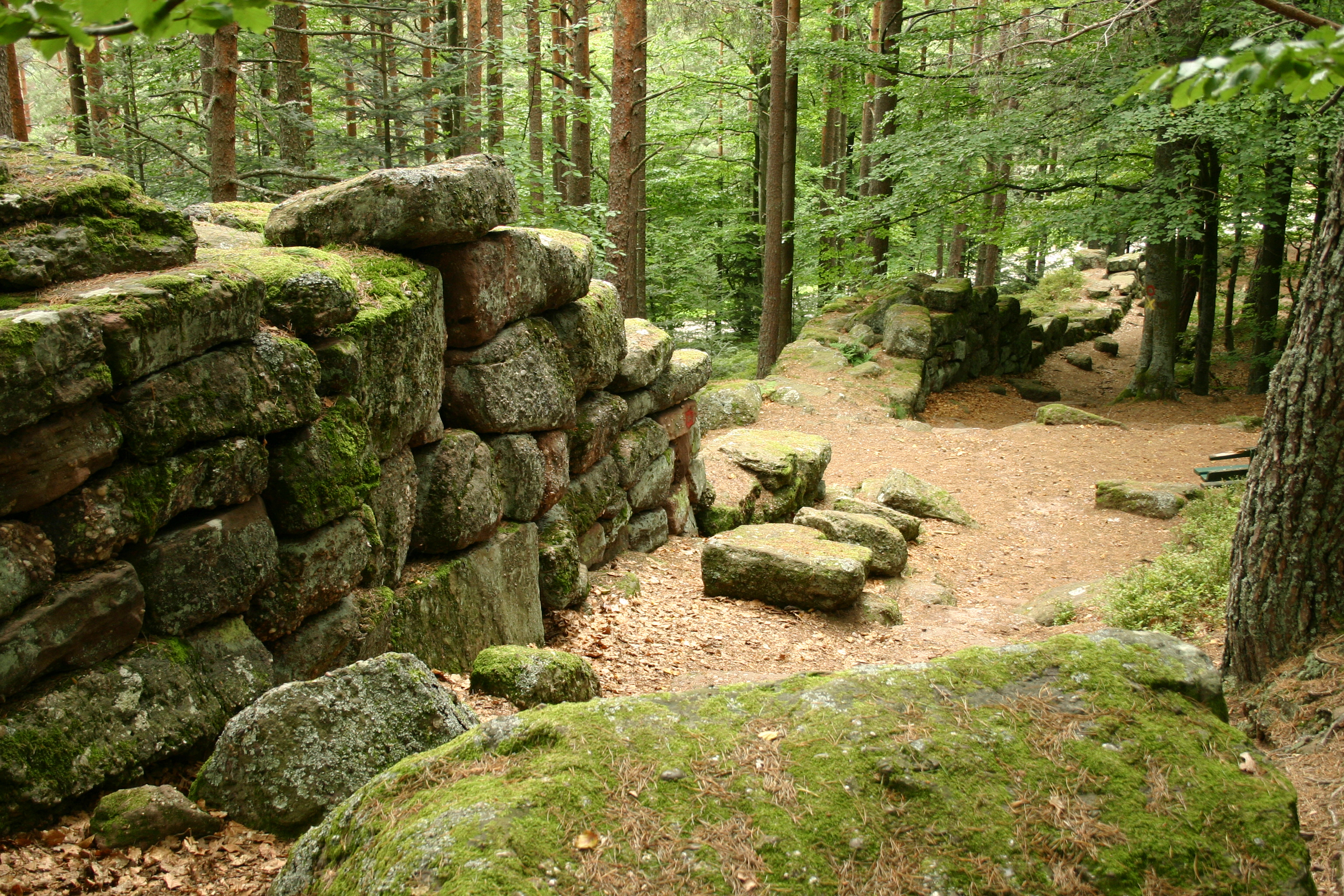
Section of the Pagan Wall

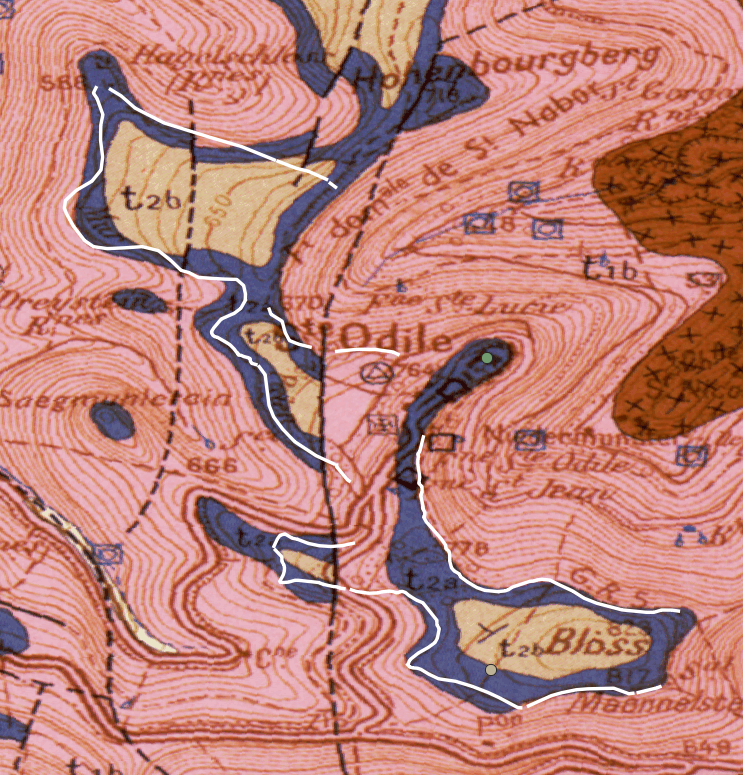
Location of the pagan wall (white lines) at Mont Sainte-Odile superimposed on geologic map (blue: Triassic conglomerates)

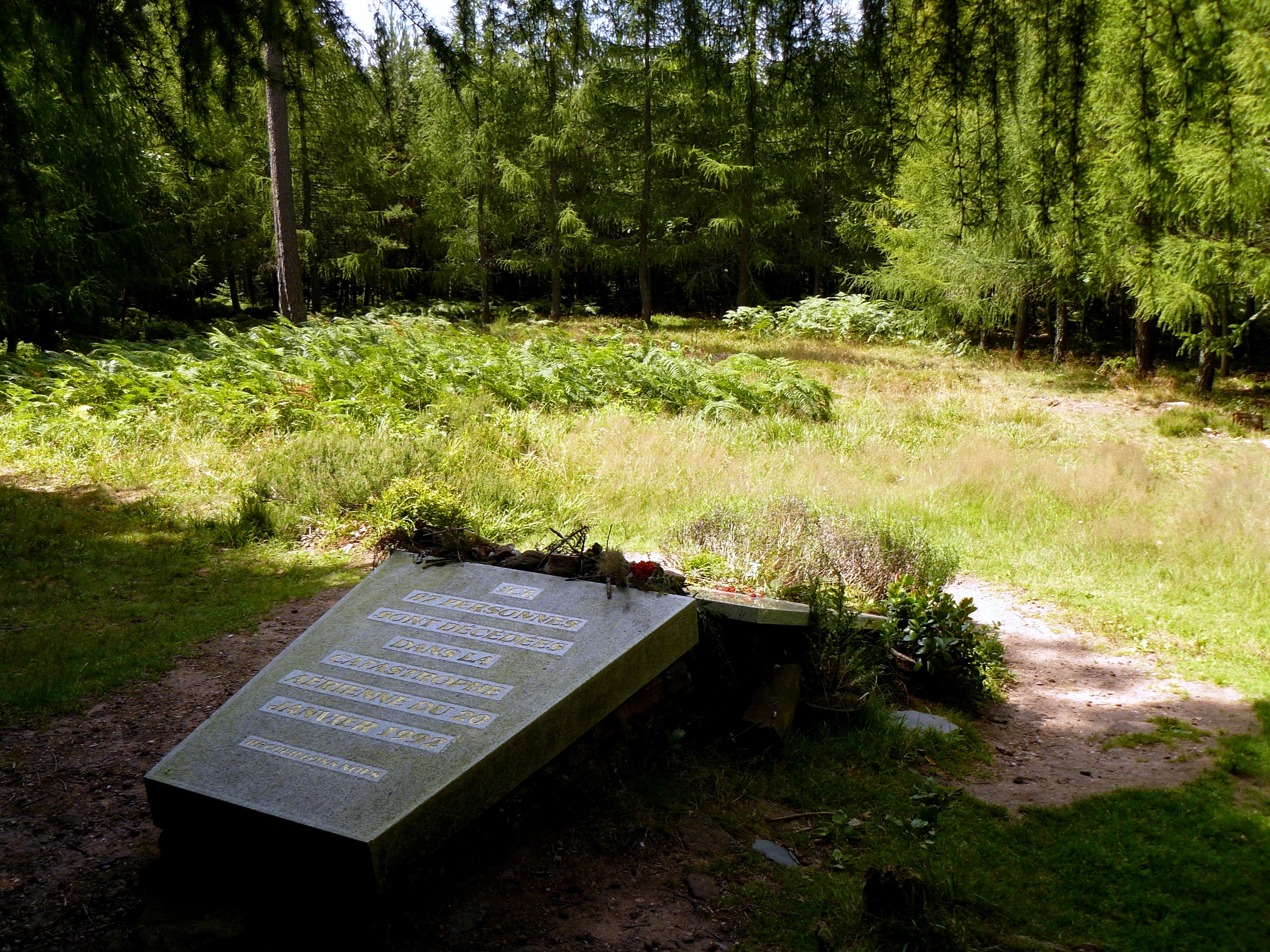
Site of Mont Sainte-Odile air crash of 20 January 1992

Mont Sainte-Odile (German: 'Odilienberg' or Ottilienberg; called Allitona in the 8th century) is a 764-metre-high peak in the Vosges Mountains in Alsace in France, immediately west of Barr. The mountain is named after Saint Odile. It has a monastery/convent at its top called the Hohenburg Abbey, and is notable also for its stone fortifications called "the Pagan Wall." In 1992, Air Inter Flight 148 crashed near this area.

== History ==
The mountain and its surroundings contain evidence of Celtic settlements. The mountain enters recorded history during the Roman times; a fortress was supposedly destroyed by the Vandals in 407. In the second half of the 9th century, when Vikings attacked the Low Countries, which had been recently converted to Christianity and were governed from Utrecht, the Utrecht bishops went into exile and stayed for a while in a convent in Sint-Odiliënberg in Limburg, named after Mont Sainte-Odile.

At least since the 19th century, its beauty has been celebrated and the mountain, with convent and pagan wall, is often included in tourist guides, incl. Baedeker's.

== Hohenburg Abbey ==
The convent is said to have been founded by Adalrich, Duke of Alsace, in honor of his daughter, Saint Odile, about the end of the 7th century, and it is certain that it existed at the time of Charlemagne. Destroyed during the Middle Ages, it was rebuilt by Premonstratensians at the beginning of the 17th century. It was acquired later by the bishop of Strasbourg, who restored the building and the adjoining church in 1853.

A famous manuscript, the Hortus Deliciarum, was compiled in the convent.

== The Pagan Wall ==
The Pagan Wall (German: Heidenmauer, French: Mur païen) is a huge construction about 10 kilometres (6.2 mi) long which encircles Mont Sainte Odile. It is composed of about 300,000 blocks of Triassic conglomerates, between 1.6 metres (5.2 ft) and 1.8 metres (5.9 ft) wide and up to 3 metres (9.8 ft) high. The irregular shape of the wall coincides almost perfectly with the location of outcrops of its source material, minimizing the effort to transport the heavy blocks to their destination. The origins and date were disputed for a long time, with some claiming that it was a 3,000-year-old druid construction. Recent research has shown that it dates from the 7th century, about the time that the convent was built. The designation "Pagan" is attributed to Pope Leo IX.

== Secret passage ==
Between August 2000 and May 2002 more than 1,000 ancient books went missing from the monastery library. Stanislas Gosse, a book collector, stole the books after finding an old map showing a secret entrance into the library. The route was not easy, however, involving climbing up exterior walls, a steep staircase and a secret chamber. A mechanism then opened the back of one of five cupboards. The disappearance of so many books over such a length of time confused the librarian, the monks and the police, with Gosse finally being caught by closed-circuit television cameras.

== In art and literature ==
A 2000 poem, "Return to St. Odilienberg, Easter 2000," by the American poet Claire Nicholas White, is inspired by the abbey.

== See also ==
- Places dedicated to Saint Odile
- Niedermunster Abbey, Alsace
