= Castles in Gers =

Castles in the Gers département of France

There are numerous castles in the Gers département of France. Many are little more than ruins and some are barely discernible, while others have been converted into modern homes. Castles or their remains may be found at the following locations, among others:

- Avensac: 14th-century castle, remodelled in the first half of the 19th century. Notable parts include the keep, enceinte and terrace with supporting wall and staircases. Privately owned, the castle has been a protected monument historique since 1983. (43°49′54″N 0°54′13″E)
- Barran: The Château de Mazères was originally a 15th-century castle, altered in the 16th, 17th and 18th centuries. Listed as a monument historique since 1981. (43°38′50″N 0°24′30″E)
- Bassoues: The Château de Bassoues dates from the last quarter of the 14th century. The property of the commune, it has been listed as a monument historique since 1840. It was built by Arnaud Aubert, who became Archbishop of Auch in 1361. The accounts for the year 1370-71 of Raymond Sans, treasurer of Auch, detail the building of the castle. (43°34′46″N 0°14′52″E)
- Beaumont: The Château de Beaumont was constructed in the 14th century. Significant building work was carried out in the 15th, 17th and 18th centuries. (43°56′53″N 0°17′6″E)
- Béraut: The privately owned Château de Lasserre is a 14th-century castle, modified in the 16th and 18th centuries. (43°55′58″N 0°24′32″E)
- Bivès: Originally a 13th-century structure, the Château de Bivès was altered for Bernard de Castelbajac in the last quarter of the 16th century when the residence was altered and a tower added. Further alterations were made in the last quarter of the 19th century. It is privately owned. (43°50′6″N 0°48′26″E)
- Berrac: The Château de Cadreils is believed to date from the 16th century. Additional building has been dated to 1689. The interior was remodelled in the 18th century. (44°0′22″N 0°33′46″E)
- Cassaigne: has two castles, both privately owned. The Château de Cassaigne dates from the 13th, 15th and 18th centuries. Of note are the façades and roofs, including those of the common buildings, the moat and bridge, the 18th century dining room and its chimney and the ground floor kitchen in the north wing. The Château de Cassaigne has been listed as a monument historique since 1987. (43°54′30″N 0°20′9″E). The Château de Léberon was constructed in the 15th, 16th and 17th centuries and has been listed as a monument historique since 1963. (43°54′40″N 0°21′7″E)
- Castéra-Lectourois: The Château de Castéra-Lectourois dates from the second half of the 15th century. Privately owned, the site has been listed as a monument historique since 1943. (43°58′33″N 0°36′29″E)
- Castet-Arrouy: The Château de Gachepouy was built between 1579 and 1584 for Anne d' Aydie, baroness of Pordéac. A staircase tower, now destroyed, was added in 1601 for Catherine des Fontaines, by Raymond Salles, master mason of Lavit de Lomagne. (43°59′4″N 0°44′6″E)
- Condom: The Château de Mothes dates from the last quarter of the 13th and first quarter of the 14th centuries, with additions from the 18th and 19th centuries. It is a privately owned monument historique, so listed since 1987. (44°0′49″N 0°25′28″E). The Château de Pouypardin dates from the last quarter of the 13th and first quarter of the 14th centuries, with additions in the 15th and 16th centuries. A monument historique since 1986, it is particularly noted for its orangery, tower, hall, staircase and roof. (43°59′31″N 0°19′45″E)
- Courrensan: The Château de Courrensan was built in the 13thm 15th, 16th and 18th centuries. It has been protected as a monument historique since 1979 and is noteworthy especially for its 15th-century columned chimney in a second-floor room. A ground-floor room in the 18th-century wing contains impressive wood decoration. (43°51′0″N 0°14′31″E)
- Espas: The Château d'Espas was originally constructed in the 13th and 14th centuries, with additions in the 17th century. Little of the original remains. (43°46′53″N 0°4′20″E)
- Flamarens: See Château de Flamarens (44°1′0″N 0°47′31″E)
- Gimbrède: A castle was built at Rouillac by Bertrand de Goth, Viscount of Lomagne, between 1311 and 1323. It was altered and enlarged in the 18th century. (44°1′16″N 0°42′29″E)
- Homps: See Château d'Homps (43°48′39″N 0°51′22″E)
- Labrihe: See Château de Bouvées (43°44′51″N 0°53′30″E)
- Lagardère: The ruins of the Château de Lagardère date back to the last quarter of the 13th century. The castle has been listed as a monument historique since 1922. (43°50′29″N 0°19′26″E)
- Larressingle: See Château de Larressingle (43°56′38″N 0°18′40″E)
- Larroque-Engalin: The ruined castle dates originally from the 13th century. A residence and staircase tower were added in the second half of the 15th century or first half of the 16th. The castle has been listed as a monument historique since 1949. (43°59′25″N 0°32′26″E)
- La Sauvetat: The Château de Sérillac was originally an ancient Gascon fortress. During the Renaissance, it was converted to a country residence. Every century from the 13th to the 18th is represented in its architecture and decoration. The castle, its grounds and the remains of the chapel have been listed as a monument historique since 2002. (43°51′16″N 0°32′23″E)
- Laujuzan: The 13th/14th-century chapel of the Château de Lau is the property of the commune and a monument historique since 1981. The Chateau de Lau, originally 11th/12th, was remodelled in the 17th/18th centuries. It is currently in a state of ruin. (43°47′9″N 0°6′21″W)
- Lavardens: The present massive structure dates from 1620 onwards, but is based around an earlier castle from the 13th century which was dismantled in 1496 by Charles VIII following a siege. (43°45′39″N 0°30′39″E)
- L'Isle-Bouzon: The commune contains the remains of three castles. A 13th-century castle was founded by the Galard family. This was totally rebuilt in the 18th century. It is privately owned. The terrace and the supporting wall have been protected as a monument historique since 1995. A 12th/13th-century castle, once the property of the family of Galard de Magnasowned and now owned by the commune, has been protected since 1951. A third castle, rebuilt in the 16th century is now a ruin and in a poor state. It has also been protected since 1951.(43°55′45″N 0°43′43″E)
- Lupiac: The Château de Castelmore is, by tradition, the birthplace of d'Artagnan. It is privately owned. (43°42′39″N 0°9′28″E)
- Maignaut-Tauzia: The Château de Tauzia dates from the end of the 13th century, with alterations from the 16th. (43°53′39″N 0°23′20″E)
- Mansencôme: The Château de Mansencôme was built in the 13th and 14th centuries. Transept windows were added in the 18th century. The castle is privately owned and has been a monument historique since 1927. (43°52′17″N 0°20′19″E)
- Mauléon-d'Armagnac: The Château de Maniban, built in the 14th century and remodelled in the 17th, includes murals from the end of the 15th and early 16th centuries. (43°53′54″N 0°9′2″W)
- Mérens: See Château de Mérens (43°45′10″N 0°32′21″E)
- Monfort: The Château d'Esclignac is a castle built at the end of the 15th century and beginning of the 16th century, protected as a monument historique since 1958. (43°48′14″N 0°48′17″E)
- Montesquiou: The Château de la Mothe was constructed in the 14th century and is now in ruins. It is a privately owned monument historique, protected since 1941. (43°34′34″N 0°18′1″E)
- Montréal: The Château de Balarin was constructed at the end of the 13th century on the frontier of what was then English territory. It underwent substantial modification at the end of the 15th century to make it habitable, most importantly, the addition of windows and a circular tower. Now ruined, it has been a protected monument historique since 1942. (43°57′53″N 0°15′2″E)
- Pouylebon: Remains of a 13th-century castle, owned by the commune and a monument historique since 1940. (43°32′52″N 0°17′38″E)
- Pouy-Roquelaure: The square castle with one upper floor is believed to date from the 16th century and was partially rebuilt in the 19th century. (44°2′11″N 0°31′11″E)
- Roquebrune: The Château de Pujos dates from the 16th century is noted for its spiral staircase and original chimneys. It is privately owned. (43°42′46″N 0°18′15″E)
- Saint-Avit-Frandat: See Château de Lacassagne (43°58′26″N 0°39′10″E)
- Sainte-Gemme: The 13th-century castle, improved in the 16th and 17th centuries, is linked to the Gère family. With its chapel, registered as a monument historique.
- Sainte-Mère: See Château de Sainte-Mère (44°0′20″N 0°40′1″E)
- Saint-Georges: The Château du Bartas (or Barthas) dates from the second half of the 16th century. (43°43′28″N 0°55′32″E)
- Saint-Jean-Poutge: See Château de Herrebouc (43°44′26″N 0°22′58″E)
- Saint-Lary: The four-storeyed ruined castle dates from the 13th and 15th centuries. It is privately owned and has been listed as a monument historique since 1933.
- Saint-Martin-d'Armagnac: The castle dates from 1563. (43°42′27″N 0°4′3″W)
- Savignac-Mona: The 16th century Château de Savignac was altered in the early 17th century and in the last quarter of the 19th. It is privately owned. (43°29′20″N 1°0′32″E)
- Seissan: The Château du Garranée was originally constructed in the 11th century. It was modified in the 13th, 14th and 15th centuries. (43°30′48″N 0°32′51″E) A tower is all that remains of another castle, believed to be 13th century, belonging to the abbots of Faget. The ground floor had no openings other than a small bay in the southern wall. It represented the typical medieval military architecture of the region. It was already in ruins at the French Revolution.
- Sempesserre: All that remains of the castle is a tower, believed to date from the second half of the 16th or first half of the 17th centuries.
- Termes-d'Armagnac: See Château de Thibault de Termes (43°40′17″N 0°0′46″W)
- Terraube: See Château de Terraube (43°54′18″N 0°33′8″E)

== See also ==
List of castles in France
