= Termes =

Termes may refer to:

== People ==
- Dick Termes, American artist
- Josep Termes (1936–2011), Spanish historian
- Rafael Termes (1918–2005), Spanish banker

== Places ==
=== Belgium ===
- Termes, Wallonia, a district of the municipality of Chiny

=== France ===
- Termes, Ardennes, now part of Grandpré
- Termes, Aude
  - Château de Termes, a ruined castle near Termes, Aude
- Termes, Lozère
- Termes-d'Armagnac, in the Gers department
  - Château de Thibault de Termes, a medieval castle in Termes-d'Armagnac, Gers

=== Spain ===
- Termantia, an archaeological site on the edge of the Duero valley

== Other uses ==
- Termes (insect), a genus of higher termites
- TERMES robots, a robotics project from Harvard University

== See also ==
- Termez, Uzbekistan
