= Homps =

Homps may refer to:

- Homps, Aude, a commune in Aude department, France
- Homps, Gers, a commune in Gers department, France

== People with the surname ==
- Emilio Homps, Argentine Olympic sailor

== See also ==
- Homp, a surname
