= Château de Lacassagne =

Château in Occitania, France

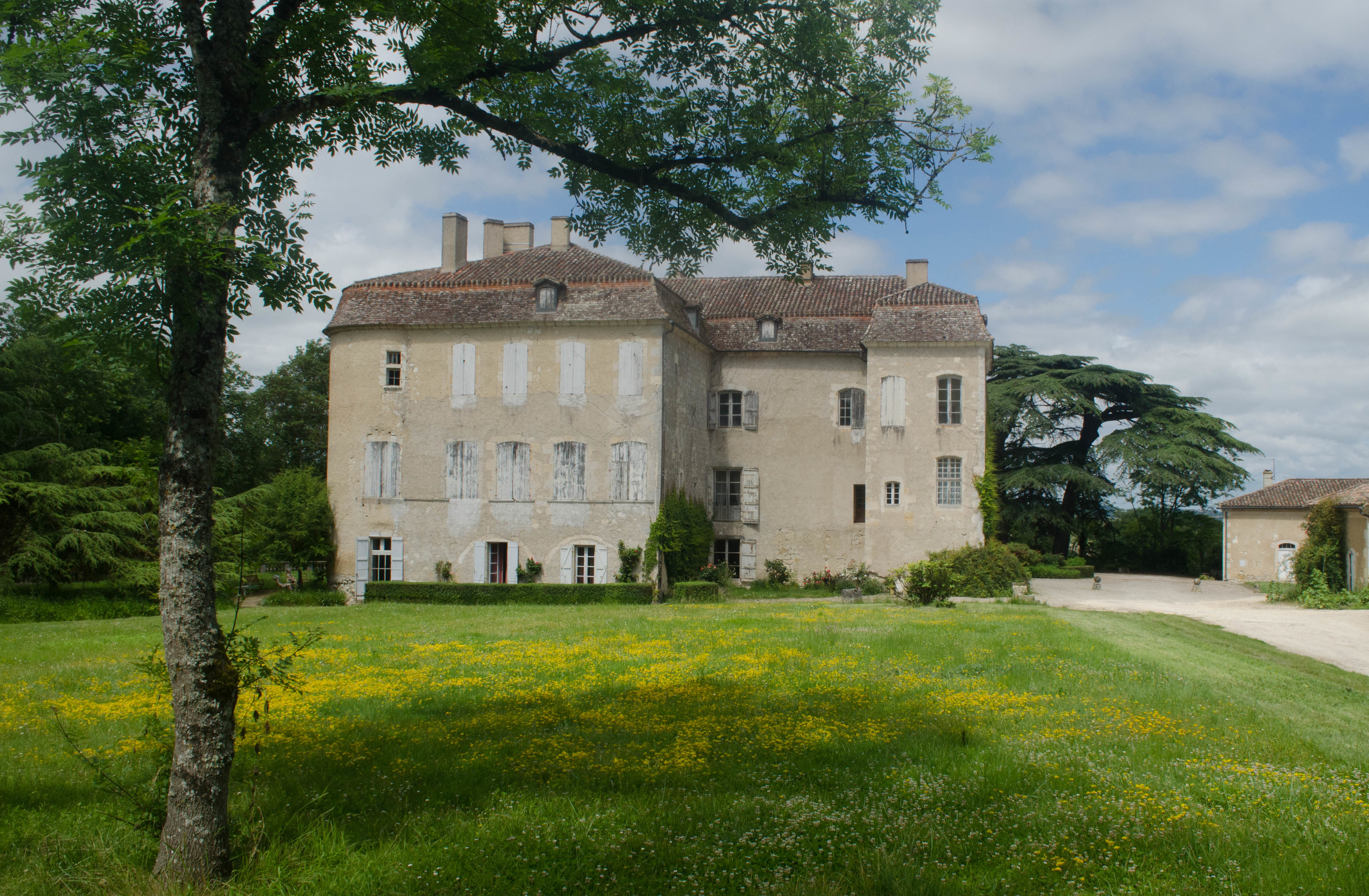
- South facade

- Location within France
- 43°58′26″N 0°39′10″E
- Location: Saint-Avit-Frandat

History
- Built: 13th century; 17th century; 19th century

Site notes
- Owner: Privately owned

Monument historique
- Official name: Château de Lacassagne
- Designated: 1980
- Reference no.: PA00094910

The Château de Lacassagne is a château in the commune of Saint-Avit-Frandat in the Gers département of France.

The Château de Lacassagne is thought to date from the latter half of the 15th century, with additions and alterations made in every century until the 19th. It originated as an ancient salle (hall) and was altered in the 15th century with the addition of a spiral staircase and windows. A residence was added in the 17th century. On the first floor, in a room known as the Salle des Chevaliers de Malte, the painted decor was done between 1620 and 1640 for Jean Bertrand de Luppé, prior of St Gilles, and intended as a replica of the grand council hall of the Knights of St John of Malta. Among the pictures are copies of Matteo da Leccio's paintings representing the attack on Valletta by the Turks in 1565. (The originals were in the council chamber of the Grandmaster's Palace in Valletta, Malta and were destroyed by Napoleon Bonaparte in 1798).

In the 19th century, a west wing was added to the main building.

The Château de Lacassagne has been listed since 1980 as a monument historique by the French Ministry of Culture, is privately owned and not open to the public.

== See also ==
- List of castles in France
- Castles in Gers
