= Homp =

Homp is a surname. Notable people with the surname include:

- Tobias Homp (born 1963), German footballer and manager
- Vera Homp (born 1991), German footballer

== See also ==
- Homps (disambiguation)
