= Château de Bouvées =

Ruined castle in France

Coordinates: 43°44′51″N 0°53′30″E

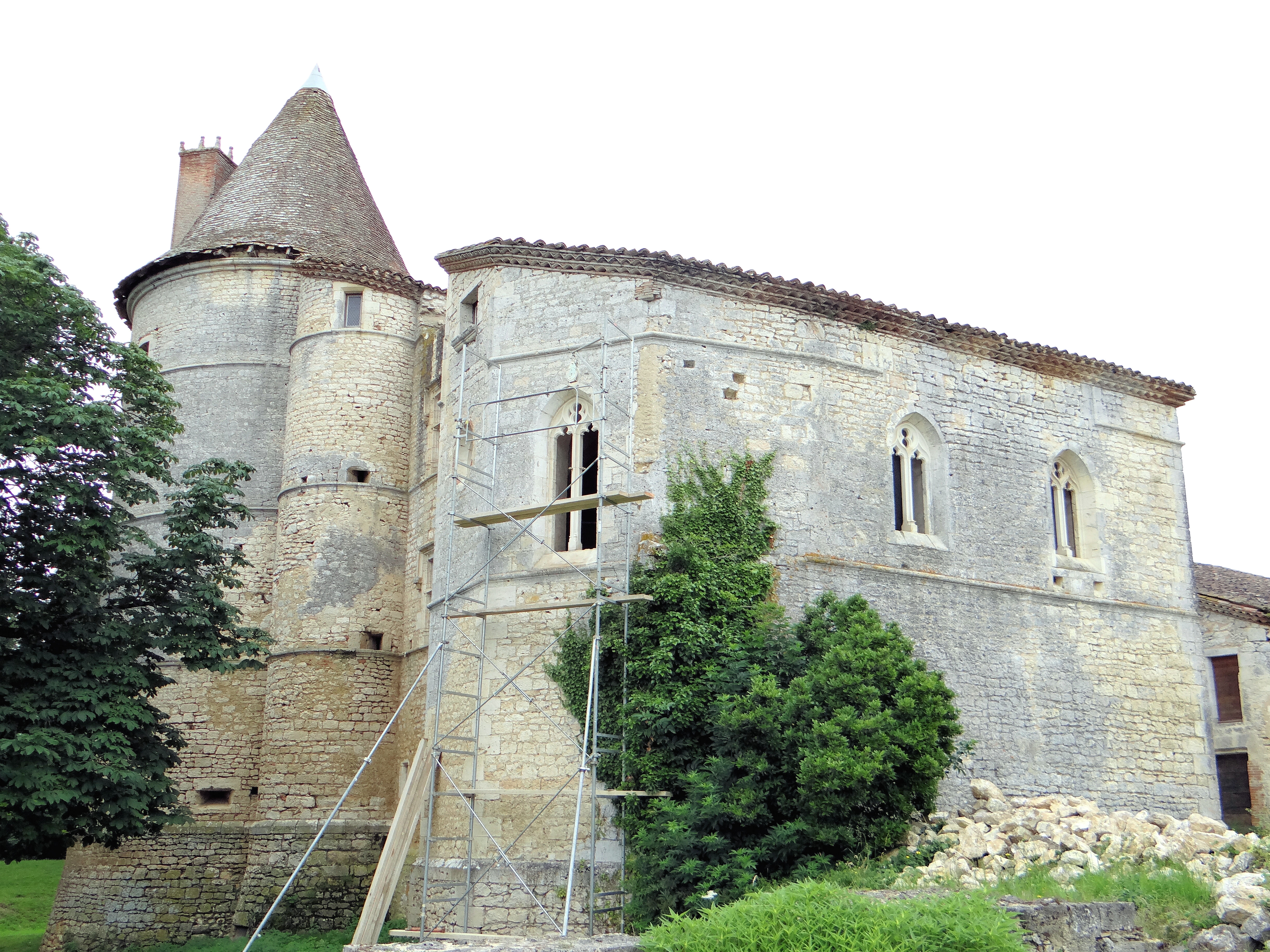
Château in 2013

The Château de Bouvées is a ruined castle in the commune of Labrihe in the Gers département of France.

The castle was built between 1530 and 1560 by Monseigneur de Saint-Julien, Bishop of Aire-sur-Adour, on the ruins of an earlier structure. At the time of the French Revolution, it was sold as a national asset.

The building consisted of three wings enclosing an inner courtyard, flanked in the corners by round towers. Only the east and south parts remain, the agricultural buildings attached to the ancient walls reproducing the earlier layout. Of the towers, all that remain are that in the south-east and traces of the south-west. The pigeon loft was built on the base of a tower. A demolished wall near the chapel reveals the former gatehouse which led into the courtyard. The chapel still has sculptures and two mullioned windows decorated with mouldings. Attached is a round tower standing on a base with four floors. A vaulted cellar gave surveillance of the surrounding area by spy holes. Inside are 15th and 18th century chimneys, earthenware paving, beamed ceilings and visible joists.

The castle is privately owned. It has been listed since 1990 as a monument historique by the French Ministry of Culture.

== See also ==
- List of castles in France
