= Château de Mérens =

Castle in Mérens in the Gers département of France

Coordinates: 43°45′10″N 0°32′21″E

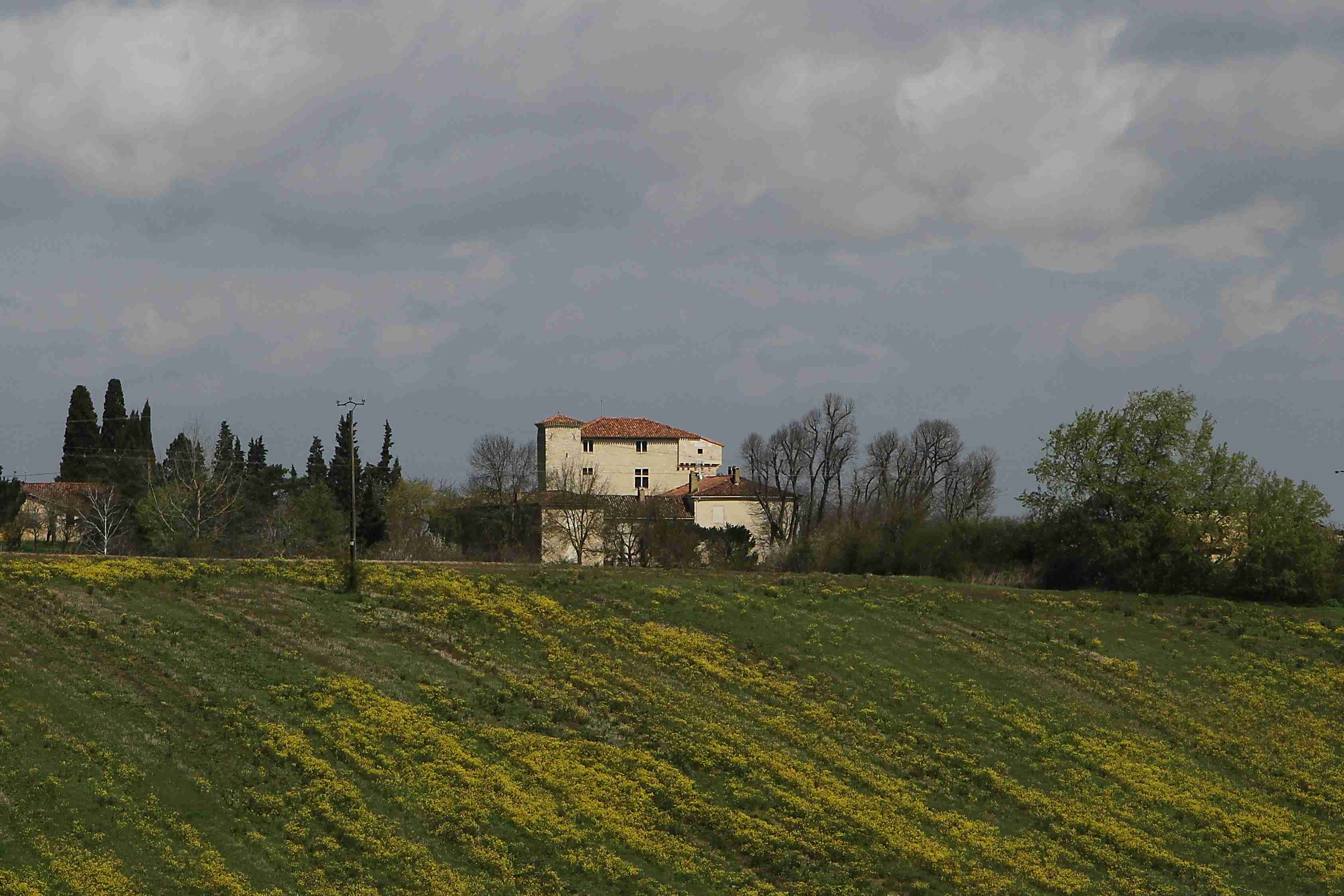
Château de Mérens

The Château de Mérens is a castle in the commune of Mérens in the Gers département of France.

Construction of the castle dates from the end of the 13th and beginning of the 14th centuries. It was altered in the early 17th century.

The hub of the castle corresponds to the original Gascon structure; the south west square tower belongs to this period of construction. At the start of the 17th century, the castle was furnished with a new system of defence, including a round walk. At the same time, windows were added and the internal layout altered. In the west elements of the mediaeval enceinte can be seen in the wine cellar. Works carried out between 1604 and 1613 concentrated on providing windows and on doubling the height of the east façade. The castle was later converted for agricultural use.

It has been listed since 2003 as a monument historique by the French Ministry of Culture.

== See also ==
- List of castles in France
- Castles in Gers
