= Château de Terraube =

13th-century castle in Gers, France

Coordinates: 43°54′18″N 0°33′8″E

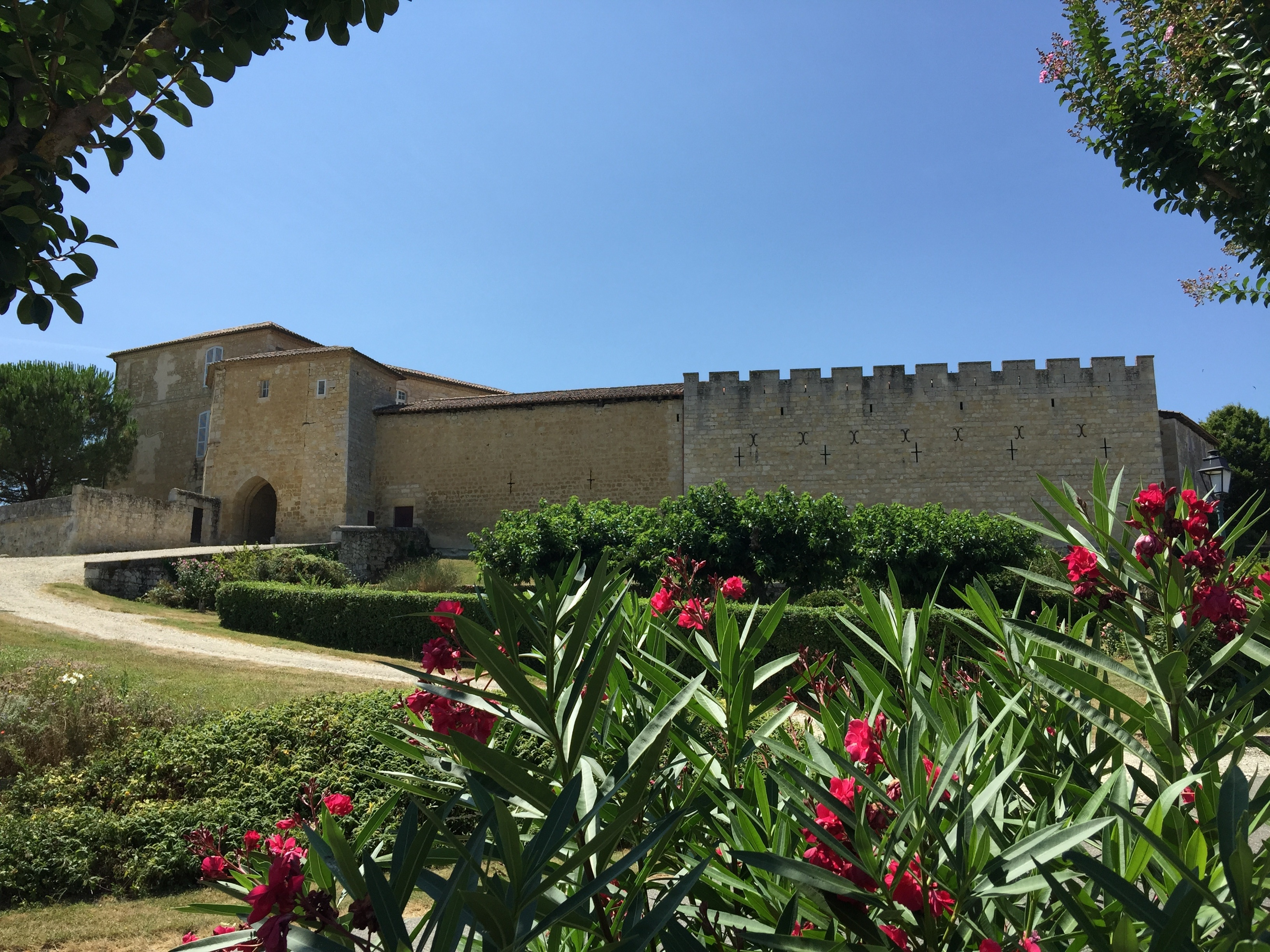
Terraube castle

The Château de Terraube is a 13th-century castle in the commune of Terraube in the Gers département of France.

This Gascon castle was built around 1272 for the de Galard family, Merovingian dukes of Gascony; a date on the doorway confirms this. The de Galards have owned the castle ever since. It was altered and enlarged in the 16th and 17th centuries. The residence was enlarged from 1768 by the master masons Guillaume Gras, Jacques Lapeyronie and Dominique Ducasse. Two further residential buildings were added around 1773 by masons Guillaume Aurio and Joseph Labarthe.

Stone decorations include animals, people, gargoyles and coats of arms, including those of the Galards on a chimney.

It has been listed since 1947 as a monument historique by the French Ministry of Culture.

== See also ==
- List of castles in France
