= Château de Sainte-Mère =

13th-century ruined castle in Gers, France

Coordinates: 44°0′20″N 0°40′1″E

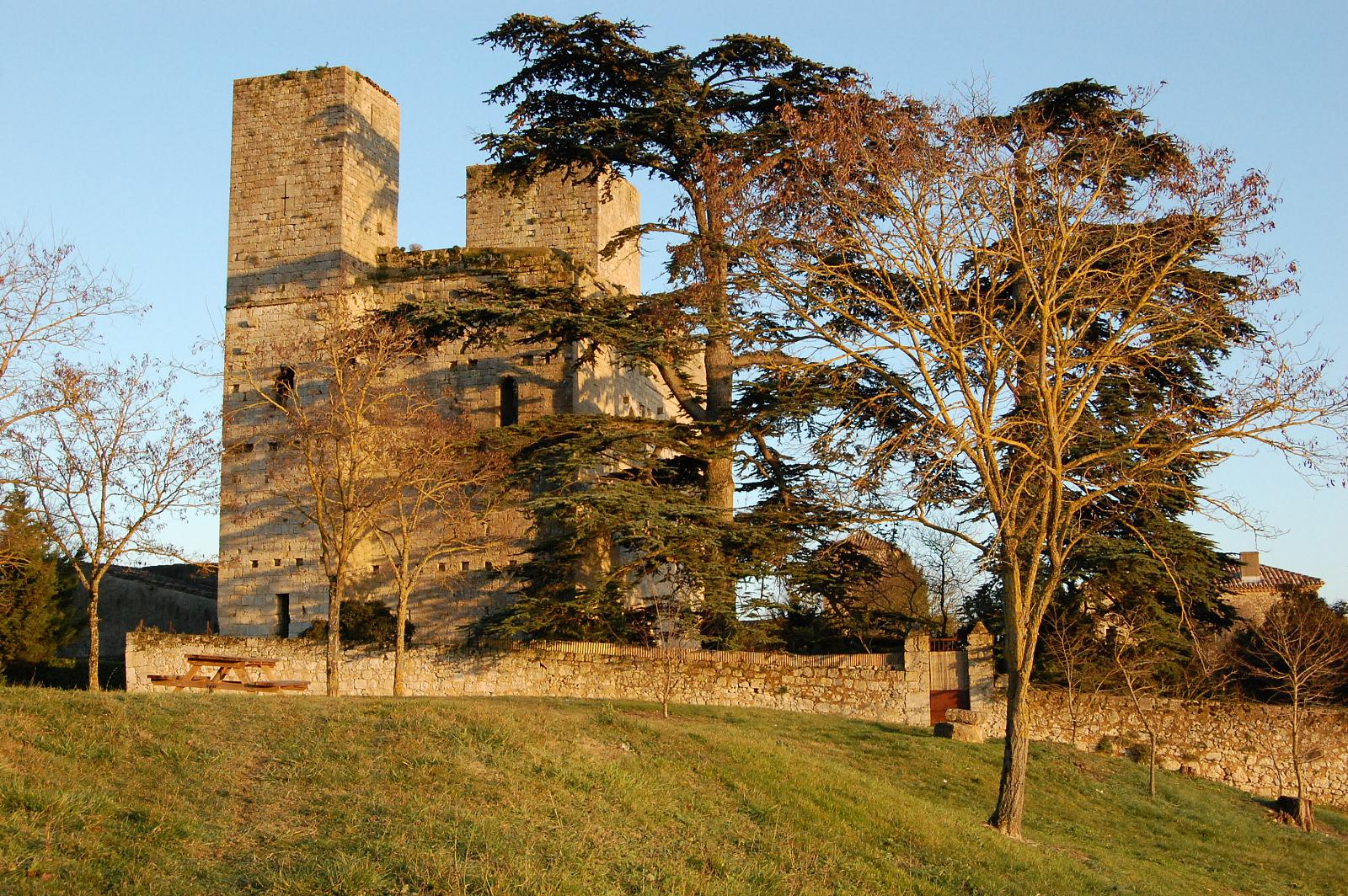
Castle, view from West

The Château de Sainte-Mère is a 13th-century ruined castle in the commune of Sainte-Mère in the Gers département of France.

The castle was built at the time of the Treaty of Amiens (1279) by the Bishop of Lectoure, Géraud de Monlezun. It defended the frontier of the English possessions. The castle had a rectangular shape, with two towers attached to the north facade.

It has been listed since 1977 as a monument historique by the French Ministry of Culture.

== See also ==
- List of castles in France
