= Saint-Jean-Poutge =

- Commune
- Coat of arms
- Location of Saint-Jean-Poutge
- Location within France Location within Occitanie
- Coordinates: 43°43′37″N 0°22′42″E
- Country: France
- Region: Occitania
- Department: Gers
- Arrondissement: Auch
- Canton: Fezensac
- Intercommunality: CA Grand Auch Cœur Gascogne

Government
  - Mayor (2020–2026): Phillipe Lafforgue
- Area^{1}: 10.8 km^{2} (4.2 sq mi)
- Elevation: 152 m (499 ft)
- Highest elevation: 225 m (738 ft)
- Lowest elevation: 105 m (344 ft)
- Population (2023): 310
  - Density: 29/km^{2} (74/sq mi)
- Time zone: UTC+01:00 (CET)
  - Summer (DST): UTC+02:00 (CEST)
- INSEE/Postal code: 32382 /32190
- ^{1} French Land Register data, which excludes lakes, ponds, glaciers > 1 km^{2} (0.386 sq mi or 247 acres) and river estuaries.

Saint-Jean-Poutge (French: [sɛ̃ ʒɑ̃ pudʒ]; Gascon: Sent Joan Potge) is a commune in the Gers department in southwestern France.

== Geography ==
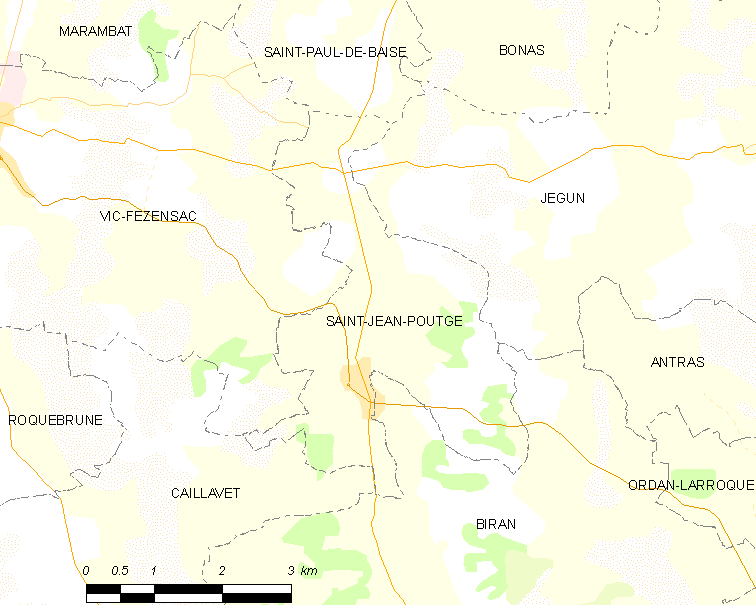
Saint-Jean-Poutge and its surrounding communes

== Population ==
Historical population
| Year | Pop. | ±% p.a. |
|---|---|---|
| 1968 | 326 | — |
| 1975 | 322 | −0.18% |
| 1982 | 314 | −0.36% |
| 1990 | 283 | −1.29% |
| 1999 | 239 | −1.86% |
| 2007 | 270 | +1.54% |
| 2012 | 319 | +3.39% |
| 2017 | 322 | +0.19% |
| 2023 | 310 | −0.63% |
Source: INSEE

== Monuments ==
- Château de Herrebouc, an older castle remodelled by a major campaign of construction work at the start of the 17th century.

== See also ==
- Communes of the Gers department
