= Savignac-Mona =

- Commune
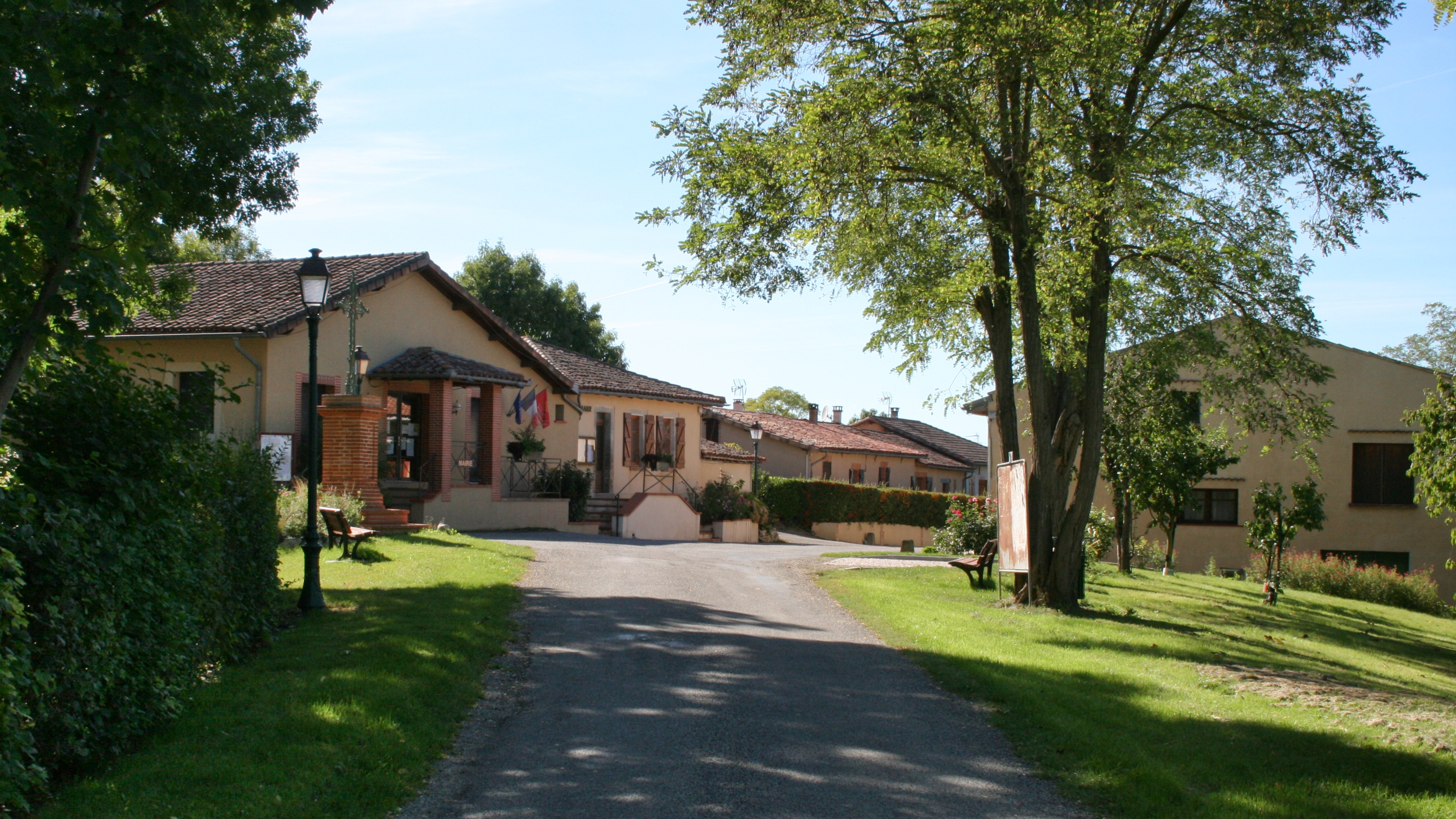
- The main street
- Location of Savignac-Mona
- Location within France Location within Occitanie
- Coordinates: 43°29′24″N 1°00′31″E
- Country: France
- Region: Occitania
- Department: Gers
- Arrondissement: Auch
- Canton: Val de Save

Government
  - Mayor (2020–2026): Patrick Maho
- Area^{1}: 6.87 km^{2} (2.65 sq mi)
- Elevation: 238 m (781 ft)
- Highest elevation: 261 m (856 ft)
- Lowest elevation: 169 m (554 ft)
- Population (2023): 146
  - Density: 21.3/km^{2} (55.0/sq mi)
- Time zone: UTC+01:00 (CET)
  - Summer (DST): UTC+02:00 (CEST)
- INSEE/Postal code: 32421 /32130
- ^{1} French Land Register data, which excludes lakes, ponds, glaciers > 1 km^{2} (0.386 sq mi or 247 acres) and river estuaries.

Savignac-Mona (French pronunciation: [saviɲak mɔna]; Occitan: Savinhac e Lo Monar) is a commune in the Gers department in southwestern France.

== Geography ==
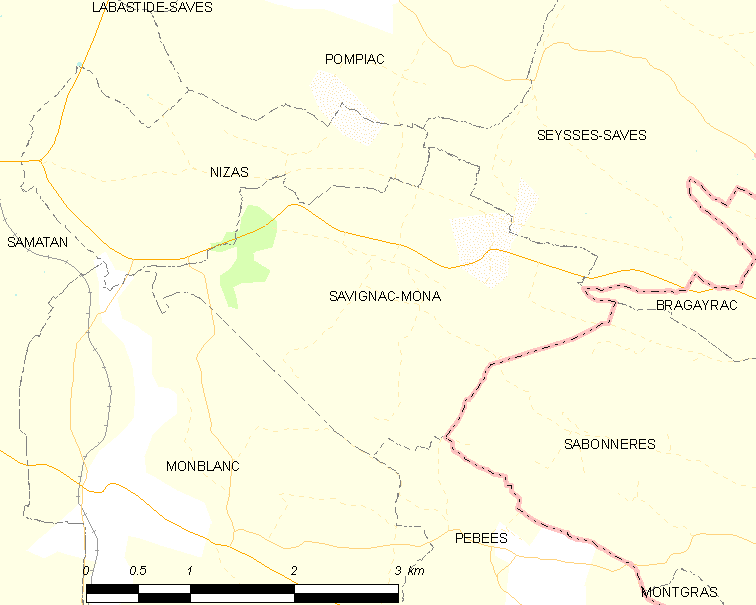
Savignac-Mona and its surrounding communes

== Population ==
Historical population
Year	Pop.	±% p.a.
1968	108	—
1975	85	−3.36%
1982	96	+1.75%
1990	101	+0.64%
1999	140	+3.69%
2007	145	+0.44%
2012	140	−0.70%
2017	138	−0.29%
2023	146	+0.94%
Source: INSEE

== See also ==
- Communes of the Gers department
- Savès
