= Flamarens =

- Commune
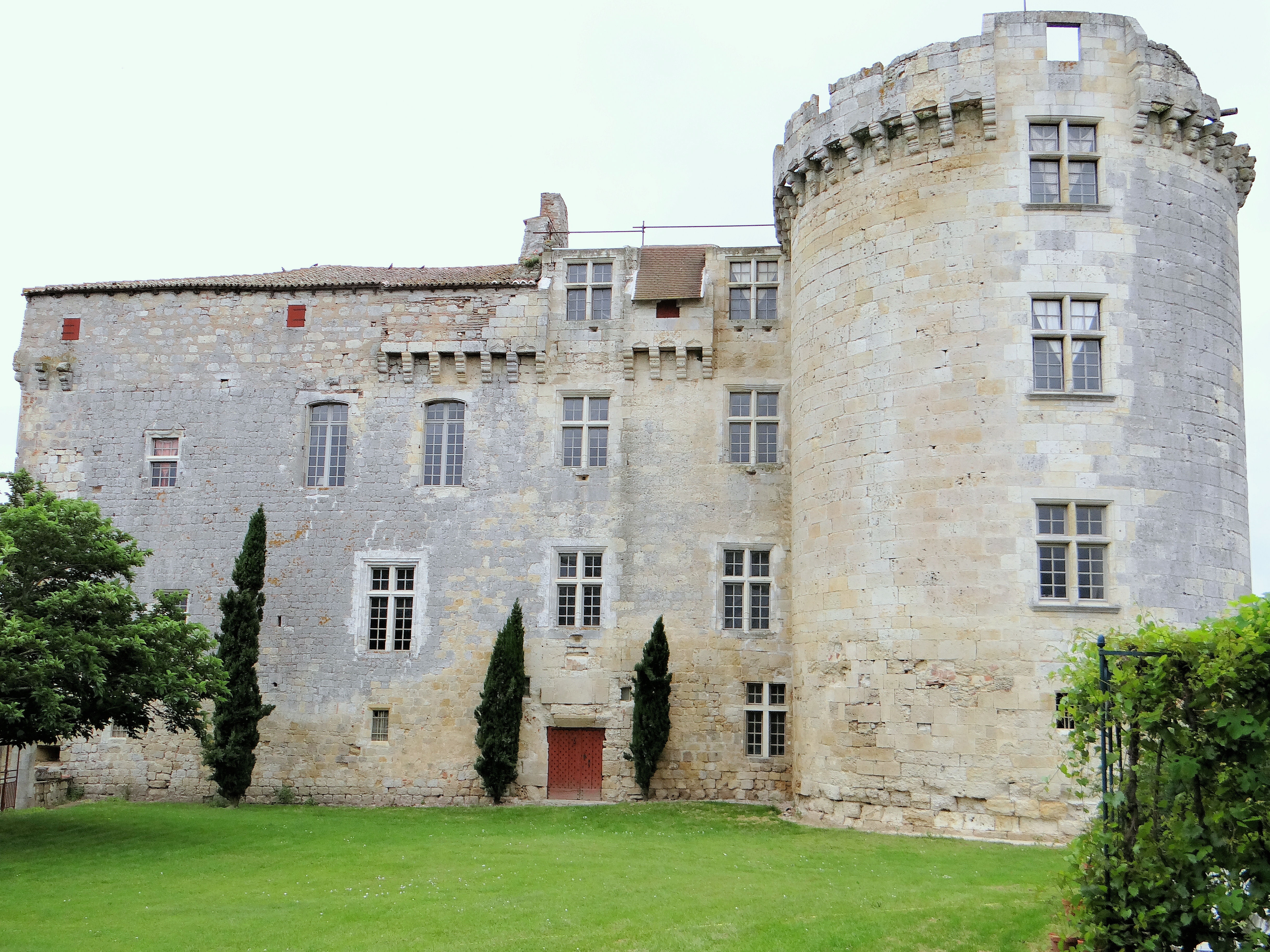
- Chateau
- Location of Flamarens
- Location within France Location within Occitanie
- Coordinates: 44°01′05″N 0°47′37″E
- Country: France
- Region: Occitania
- Department: Gers
- Arrondissement: Condom
- Canton: Lectoure-Lomagne
- Intercommunality: Lomagne Gersoise

Government
  - Mayor (2020–2026): Dominique Blanc
- Area^{1}: 14.36 km^{2} (5.54 sq mi)
- Highest elevation: 212 m (696 ft)
- Lowest elevation: 77 m (253 ft)
- Population (2023): 133
  - Density: 9.26/km^{2} (24.0/sq mi)
- Time zone: UTC+01:00 (CET)
  - Summer (DST): UTC+02:00 (CEST)
- INSEE/Postal code: 32131 /32340
- ^{1} French Land Register data, which excludes lakes, ponds, glaciers > 1 km^{2} (0.386 sq mi or 247 acres) and river estuaries.

Flamarens (Gascon: "Flamarens") is a commune located in the northeast of the Gers department in the Occitanie administrative region. Historically and culturally, the commune is in the Lomagne region, a former district of the Gascony province.

Experiencing an altered oceanic climate, it is drained by the Métau stream and various other small streams.

The commune's architectural heritage includes two buildings protected as historic monuments of France: the Château de Flamarens, listed in 1965, and the Church of Saint-Saturnin in Flamarens, registered in 1993.

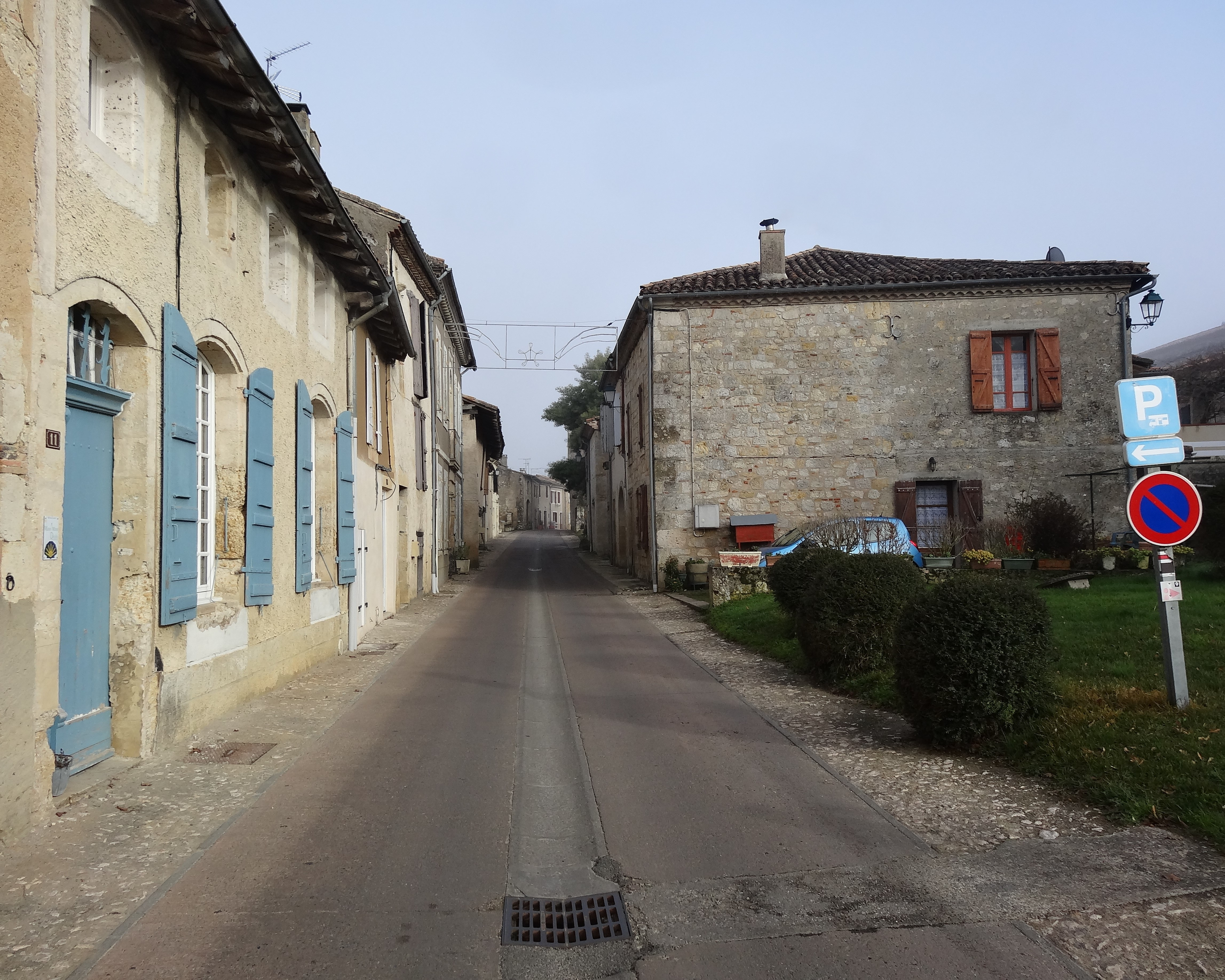
The main street

== Geography ==
=== Location ===
Flamarens is a commune in Gascony located on the old National Road 653 between Valence (Tarn-et-Garonne) and Fleurance, in the Lomagne department. It borders the Tarn-et-Garonne department.

=== Geology and relief ===
Lomagne is divided into two regions: the so-called limestone Lomagne and the earth Lomagne. Flamarens is located in the latter. This region of Gers is characterized by highly technical agriculture: wheat and maize, but also melon and garlic, and seeds, represent the main activity of a sparse population. Backyard livestock also play a major role.

Flamarens is located in seismicity zone 1 (very low seismicity).

== Geography ==
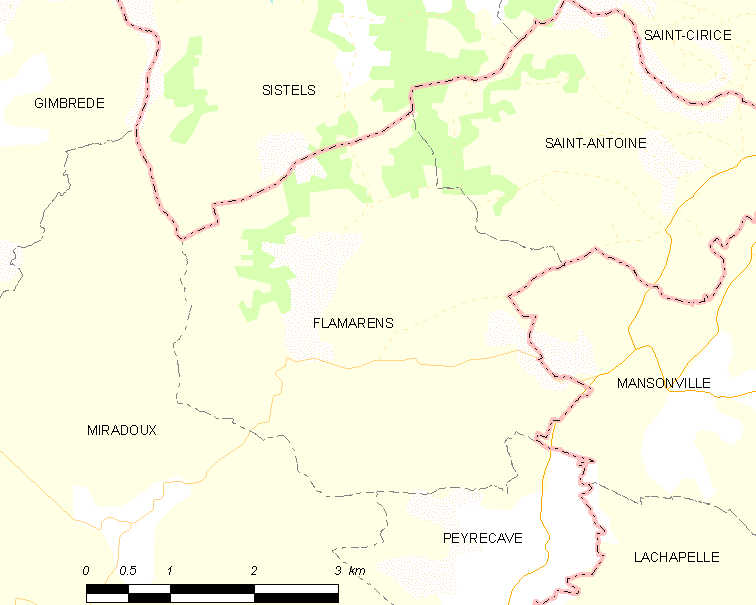
Flamarens and its surrounding communes

== Population ==
Historical population
Year	Pop.	±% p.a.
1968	189	—
1975	164	−2.01%
1982	168	+0.34%
1990	145	−1.82%
1999	146	+0.08%
2007	114	−3.05%
2012	128	+2.34%
2017	150	+3.22%
2023	133	−1.98%
Source: INSEE

== See also ==
- Communes of the Gers department
