= Château d'Homps =

Ruined castle in Homps in the Gers département of France

Coordinates: 43°48′39″N 0°51′22″E

The Château d' Homps is a ruined castle in the commune of Homps in the Gers département of France. The 13th-century fortification on a rocky outcrop was abandoned for a more comfortable house built in the 16th century. It was sold as a national asset during the French Revolution and subsequently used as a quarry. Only one a tower converted into a pigeon loft, remains intact. The courtyard and sections of the enceinte are still visible. The privately owned castle has been listed since 1999 as a monument historique by the French Ministry of Culture.

== See also ==
- List of castles in France
