= Château de Flamarens =

13th-century castle in France

Coordinates: 44°1′0″N 0°47′31″E

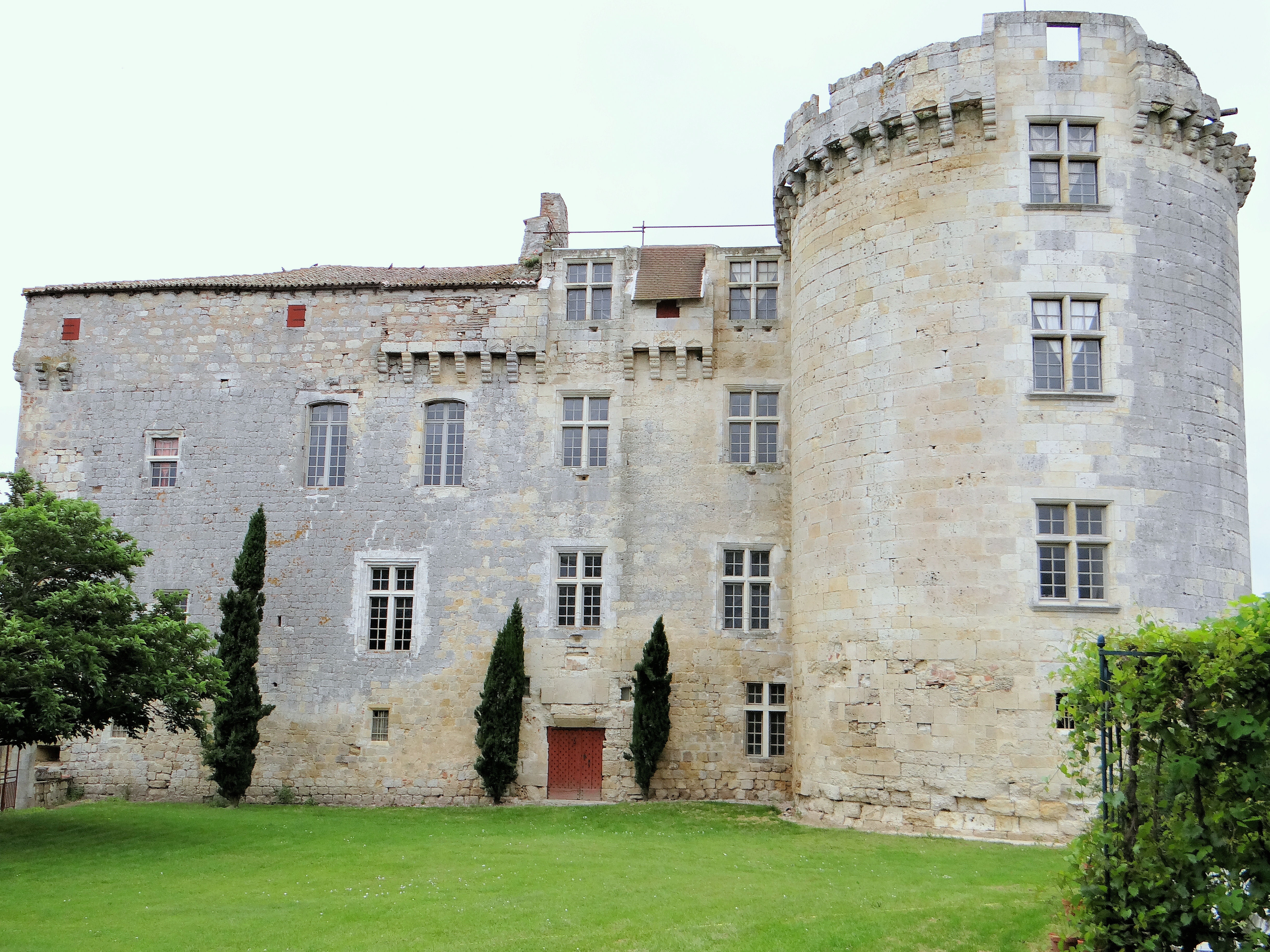
Castle of Flamarens

The Château de Flamarens is a castle in the commune of Flamarens in the Gers département of France.

A castrum is mentioned on the site in 1289, and is believed to have been remodelled in the 14th century. Additional building work and alterations were made some time between 1469 and about 1475 by Jean de Cazanove for Jean de Grosolles. The northern part was built before 1536 by Georges Dauzières for Arnaud de Grossolles. Alterations were made to the windows and interior decoration in the 18th century. The castle was partially destroyed by fire in 1943.

The castle is privately owned. It has been listed since 1965 as a monument historique by the French Ministry of Culture. It is open to the public during July and August.

== See also ==
- List of castles in France
