= Termite-inspired robots =

A termite-inspired robot in the foreground and a structure made out of blocks under construction by other robots in the background

Termite-inspired robots or TERMES robots are biomimetic autonomous robots capable of building complex structures without a central controller. A prototype team of termite-inspired robots was demonstrated by Harvard University researchers in 2014, following four years of development. Their engineering was inspired by the complex mounds that termites build, and was accomplished by developing simple rules to allow the robots to navigate and move building blocks in their environment. By following these simple rules, the robots could construct complex structures through a process called stigmergy, without requiring constant human instruction or supervision.

== Background ==
Social insects such as termites are capable of constructing elaborate structures such as mounds with complex tunnel systems. They are capable of doing so without an overall plan for the design of a structure, without directly communicating information with each other about how to construct a structure, and without a leader to guide them in constructing a specific structure. Roboticists have been interested in the problem of whether robots can be designed with the limited sensory and motor capabilities of insects such as termites and yet, by following simple rules, construct elaborate and complex structures.

== Robots ==
As part of the TERMES project, the Harvard team designed each robot to perform a few simple behaviors: to move forward, move backward, turn, move up or down a step the size of a specially designed brick, and to move while carrying a brick on top of it. To perform these locomotor behaviors, each robot was equipped with whegs. To detect features of its environment and other robots, each robot was equipped with the following sensors: seven infrared sensors to detect black and white patterns for navigation; an accelerometer to detect tilt angle for climbing; and five ultrasound sonar detectors for determining distance from the perimeter and nearby robots. To lift, lower, and place the specially designed bricks, each robot had an arm with a spring-loaded gripper to hold a brick while carried. The project's specially designed construction bricks were 21.5 cm × 21.5 cm × 4.5 cm, which was bigger than the footprint (17.5 cm × 11.0 cm) of the robots.

== Constructing structures ==
During the Harvard trials, groups of termite-inspired robots constructed structures by stigmergy. That is, instead of directly communicating with each other, the robots detected features of their environment and followed simple rules for moving and placing bricks in response to the configuration of bricks that existed at a given time. The rules for constructing a given structure were designed to guarantee that different structures emerged depending on the number of robots involved and on the initial placement of bricks.

The TERMES robots constitute a proof of concept for the development of relatively simple teams of robots that are capable of constructing complex structures in, for example, remote or hostile locations. The Harvard researchers who built the initial termite-inspired robots have speculated that future robots could be designed to build a base for human habitation on Mars in preparation for the arrival of human astronauts. More immediate possibilities include teams of termite-inspired robots that are capable of moving sandbags and building levees in flood zones.
