= Château de Herrebouc =

Castle in Saint-Jean-Poutge, Gers, France

Coordinates: 43°44′26″N 0°22′58″E

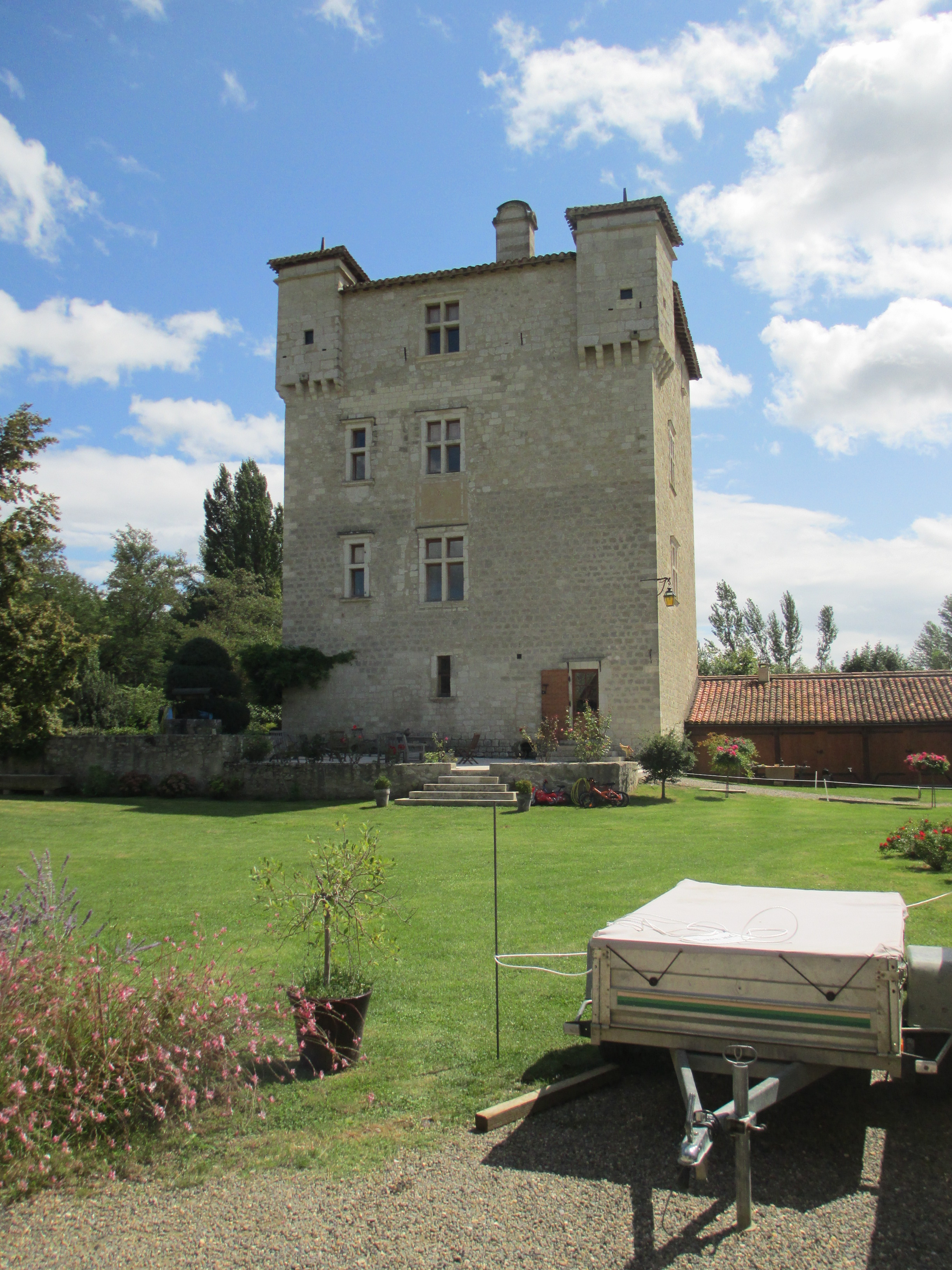

The Château de Herrebouc is a castle in the commune of Saint-Jean-Poutge in the Gers département of France.

Though an older building, the present look of the castle is the result of a major campaign of construction work at the start of the 17th century. On the ground floor, the 17th century ceiling is partially conserved. The farm buildings date from this period. The pigeon loft is characteristic of the architecture of the time of Henri IV (reigned 1589 to 1610). The wine cellar is probably a later structure.

The mill retains an intact medieval base. Medieval walls are also visible in the buildings of the farm.

It has been listed since 1926 as a monument historique by the French Ministry of Culture.

== See also ==
- List of castles in France
