= Saint-Avit-Frandat =

- Commune
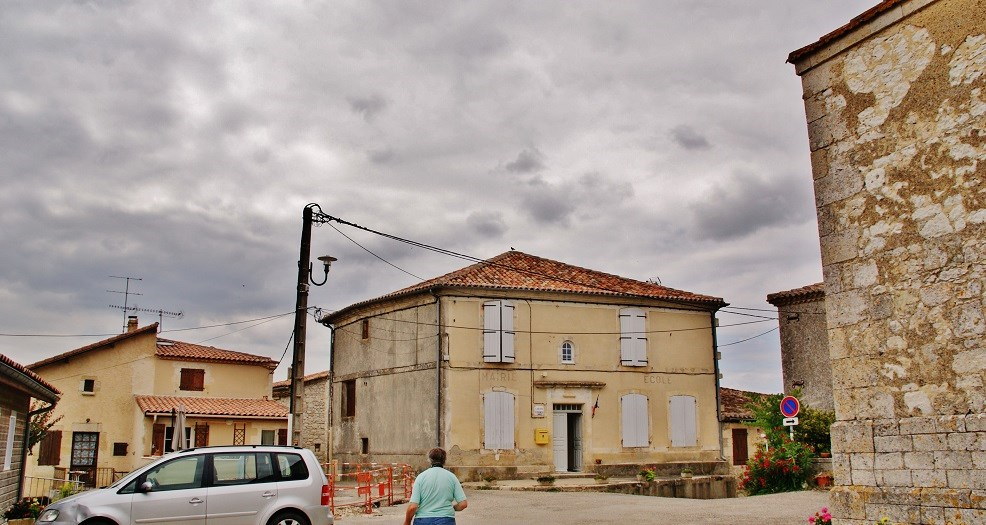
- The town hall in Saint-Avit-Frandat
- Location of Saint-Avit-Frandat
- Location within France Location within Occitanie
- Coordinates: 43°58′43″N 0°39′10″E
- Country: France
- Region: Occitania
- Department: Gers
- Arrondissement: Condom
- Canton: Lectoure-Lomagne

Government
  - Mayor (2020–2026): Serge Pivetta
- Area^{1}: 7.55 km^{2} (2.92 sq mi)
- Elevation: 180 m (590 ft)
- Highest elevation: 195 m (640 ft)
- Lowest elevation: 96 m (315 ft)
- Population (2023): 97
  - Density: 13/km^{2} (33/sq mi)
- Time zone: UTC+01:00 (CET)
  - Summer (DST): UTC+02:00 (CEST)
- INSEE/Postal code: 32364 /32700
- ^{1} French Land Register data, which excludes lakes, ponds, glaciers > 1 km^{2} (0.386 sq mi or 247 acres) and river estuaries.

Saint-Avit-Frandat (French pronunciation: [sɛ̃.t‿avi fʁɑ̃da]; Gascon: Sent Avit e Frandat) is a commune in the Gers department in southwestern France.

== Geography ==
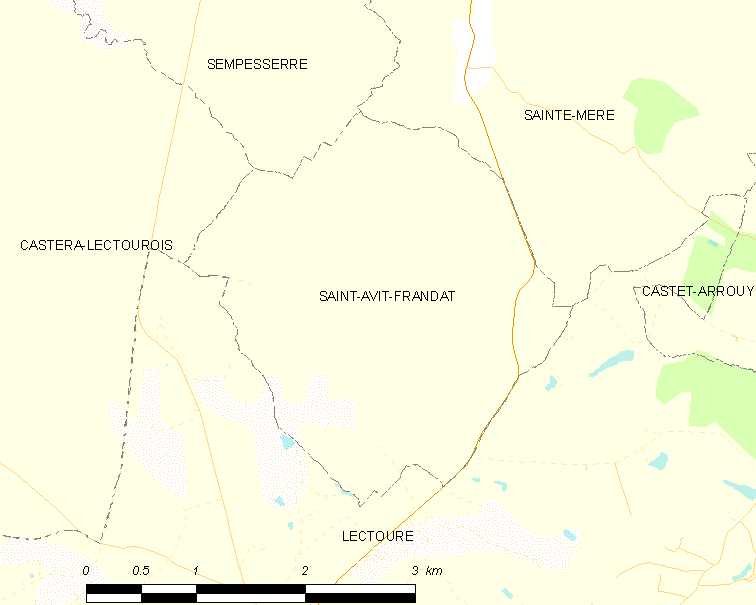
Saint-Avit-Frandat and its surrounding communes

== Population ==
Historical population
Year	Pop.	±% p.a.
1968	126	—
1975	119	−0.81%
1982	113	−0.74%
1990	92	−2.54%
1999	85	−0.88%
2007	110	+3.28%
2012	93	−3.30%
2017	99	+1.26%
2023	97	−0.34%
Source: INSEE

== See also ==
- Communes of the Gers department
