= Château de Thibault de Termes =

Medieval castle in Gers, France

Coordinates: 43°40′17″N 0°0′46″W

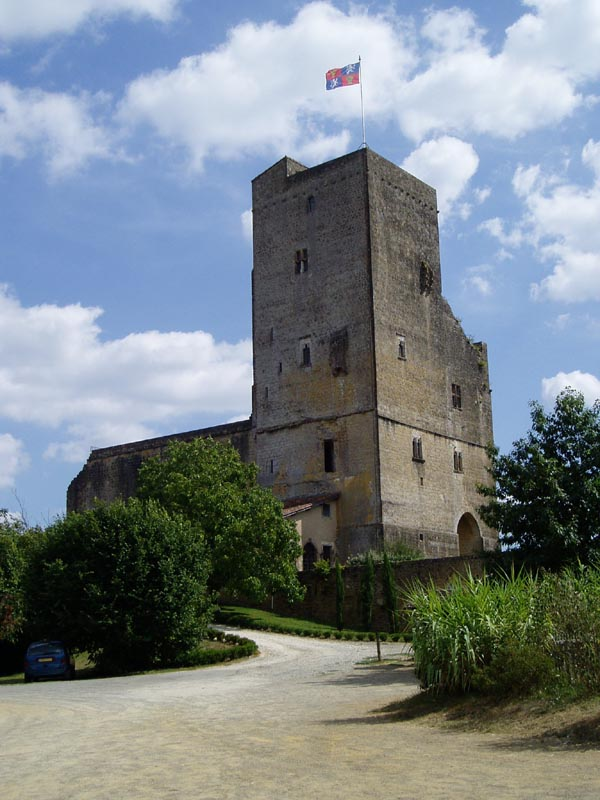

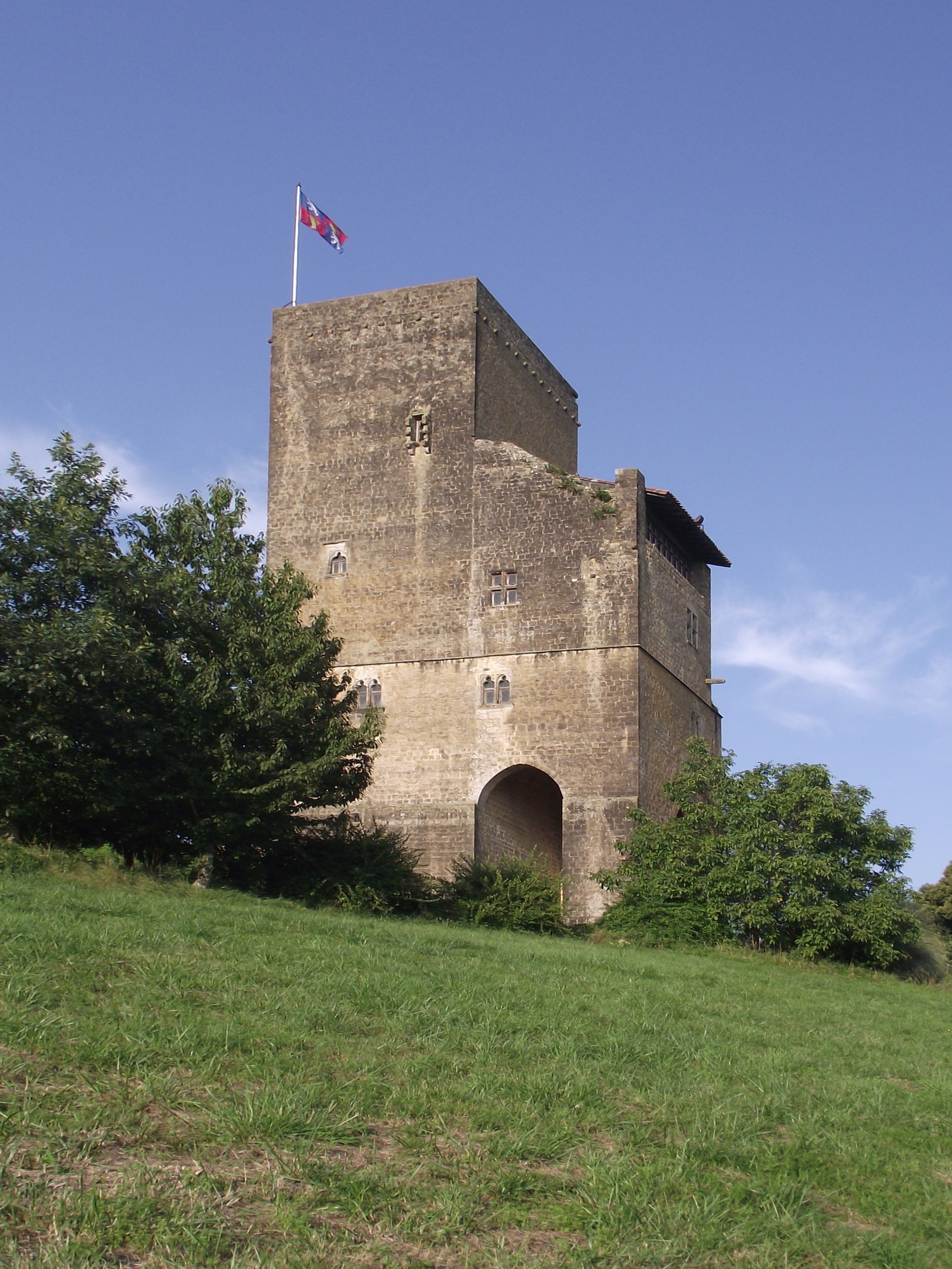

Alternative name: Château d' Armagnac. Not to be confused with Château de Termes in Aude.

The Château de Thibault de Termes was a medieval castle in the French town and commune of Termes-d'Armagnac, in the Gers département. The keep (La Tour de Termes-d'Armagnac) is the only vestige.

Construction of the castle dates from the end of the 13th century and start of the 14th century for Jean, Count of Armagnac. The keep is 36 m (~118 ft) high and includes six levels. Strategically built on a hill which dominates the valleys of the Adour and the Arros, it allowed the d'Armagnac family to keep watch over the frontiers of the province of Armagnac.

Its most famous inhabitant was the founder's son, Thibault d'Armagnac, who fought alongside Joan of Arc. He gave evidence on her behalf at her trial.

The castle belonged to the Armagnac-Termes family until the French Revolution, when it was declared a national asset and sold. Various people owned it until it was bought by the commune in the 1960s. The main building having been demolished, the stone of what remained was used to build the railway line between Port Saint Marie à Riscle. The keep became overgrown until it was bought by the commune in the 1960s and, under the Association du Pays vert de d’Artagnan, restored and turned into a museum.

Classed as a monument historique (historic monument) by the French Ministry of Culture in 1962, the tower now houses a museum of Gascon life with exhibits on regional history and culture.

== See also ==
- List of castles in France
