= Terraube =

- Commune
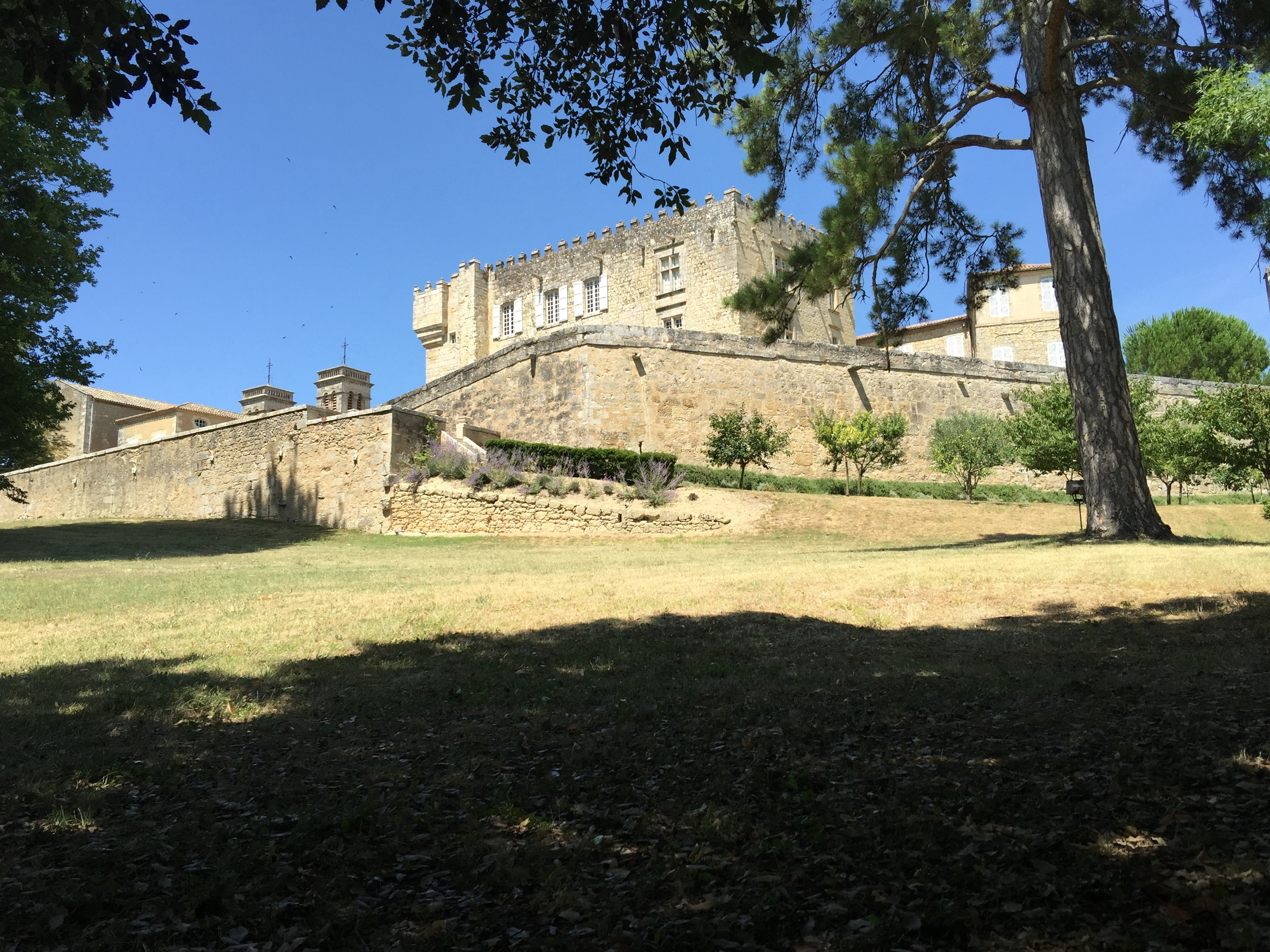
- The castle in Terraube

- Coat of arms
- Location of Terraube
- Location within France Location within Occitanie
- Coordinates: 43°54′27″N 0°33′09″E
- Country: France
- Region: Occitania
- Department: Gers
- Arrondissement: Condom
- Canton: Lectoure-Lomagne

Government
  - Mayor (2020–2026): Pierre Laffargue
- Area^{1}: 25.14 km^{2} (9.71 sq mi)
- Elevation: 160 m (520 ft)
- Highest elevation: 227 m (745 ft)
- Lowest elevation: 85 m (279 ft)
- Population (2023): 352
  - Density: 14.0/km^{2} (36.3/sq mi)
- Time zone: UTC+01:00 (CET)
  - Summer (DST): UTC+02:00 (CEST)
- INSEE/Postal code: 32442 /32700
- ^{1} French Land Register data, which excludes lakes, ponds, glaciers > 1 km^{2} (0.386 sq mi or 247 acres) and river estuaries.

Terraube (French pronunciation: [tɛʁob]; Gascon: Terrauba) is a commune in the Gers department in southwestern France.

== History ==
During the early stages of the French Wars of Religion in September 1562, many of the largely Protestant inhabitants were massacred by order of the Royalist commander Blaise de Montluc, and their bodies thrown into a well.

== Geography ==
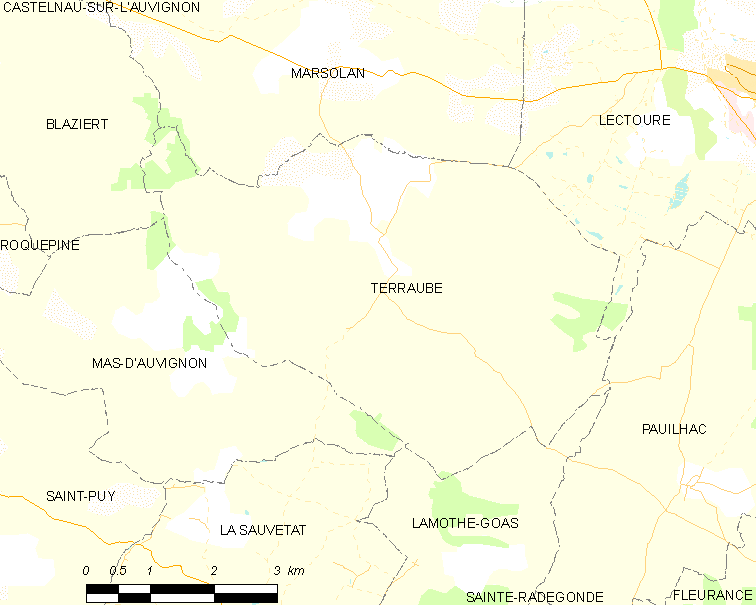
Terraube and its surrounding communes

== Population ==
Historical population
| Year | Pop. | ±% p.a. |
|---|---|---|
| 1968 | 504 | — |
| 1975 | 522 | +0.50% |
| 1982 | 500 | −0.61% |
| 1990 | 435 | −1.73% |
| 1999 | 381 | −1.46% |
| 2007 | 389 | +0.26% |
| 2012 | 389 | +0.00% |
| 2017 | 372 | −0.89% |
| 2023 | 352 | −0.92% |
Source: INSEE

== See also ==
- Communes of the Gers department

== Sources ==
- Knecht, Robert (1995). "The sword and the pen: Blaise de Monluc and his "Commentaires"". Renaissance Studies. 9 (1). JSTOR 24412373.
