= Labrihe =

- Commune
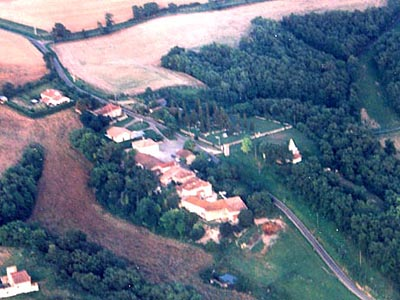
- A general view of Labrihe

- Coat of arms
- Location of Labrihe
- Location within France Location within Occitanie
- Coordinates: 43°46′17″N 0°52′38″E
- Country: France
- Region: Occitania
- Department: Gers
- Arrondissement: Condom
- Canton: Gimone-Arrats

Government
  - Mayor (2020–2026): Christian Pontac
- Area^{1}: 9.44 km^{2} (3.64 sq mi)
- Elevation: 184 m (604 ft)
- Highest elevation: 184 m (604 ft)
- Lowest elevation: 115 m (377 ft)
- Population (2023): 212
  - Density: 22.5/km^{2} (58.2/sq mi)
- Time zone: UTC+01:00 (CET)
  - Summer (DST): UTC+02:00 (CEST)
- INSEE/Postal code: 32173 /32120
- ^{1} French Land Register data, which excludes lakes, ponds, glaciers > 1 km^{2} (0.386 sq mi or 247 acres) and river estuaries.

Labrihe is a commune in the Gers department in southwestern France.

== Geography ==
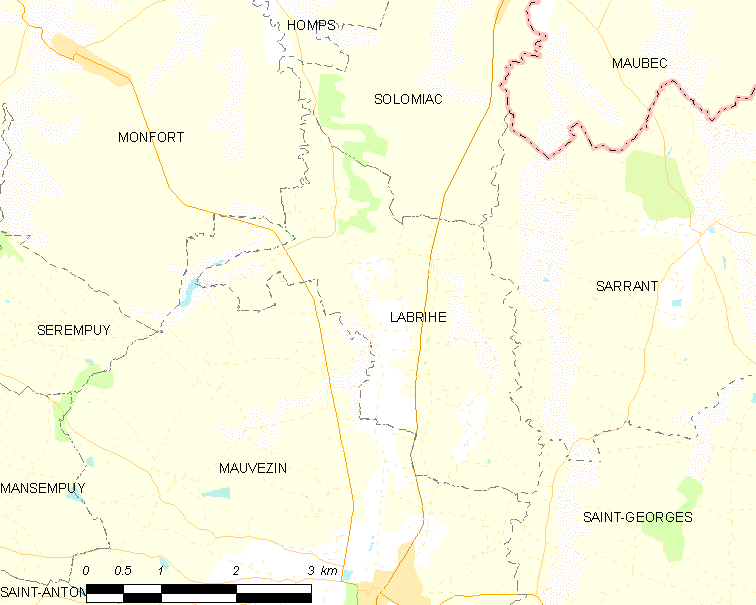
Labrihe and its surrounding communes

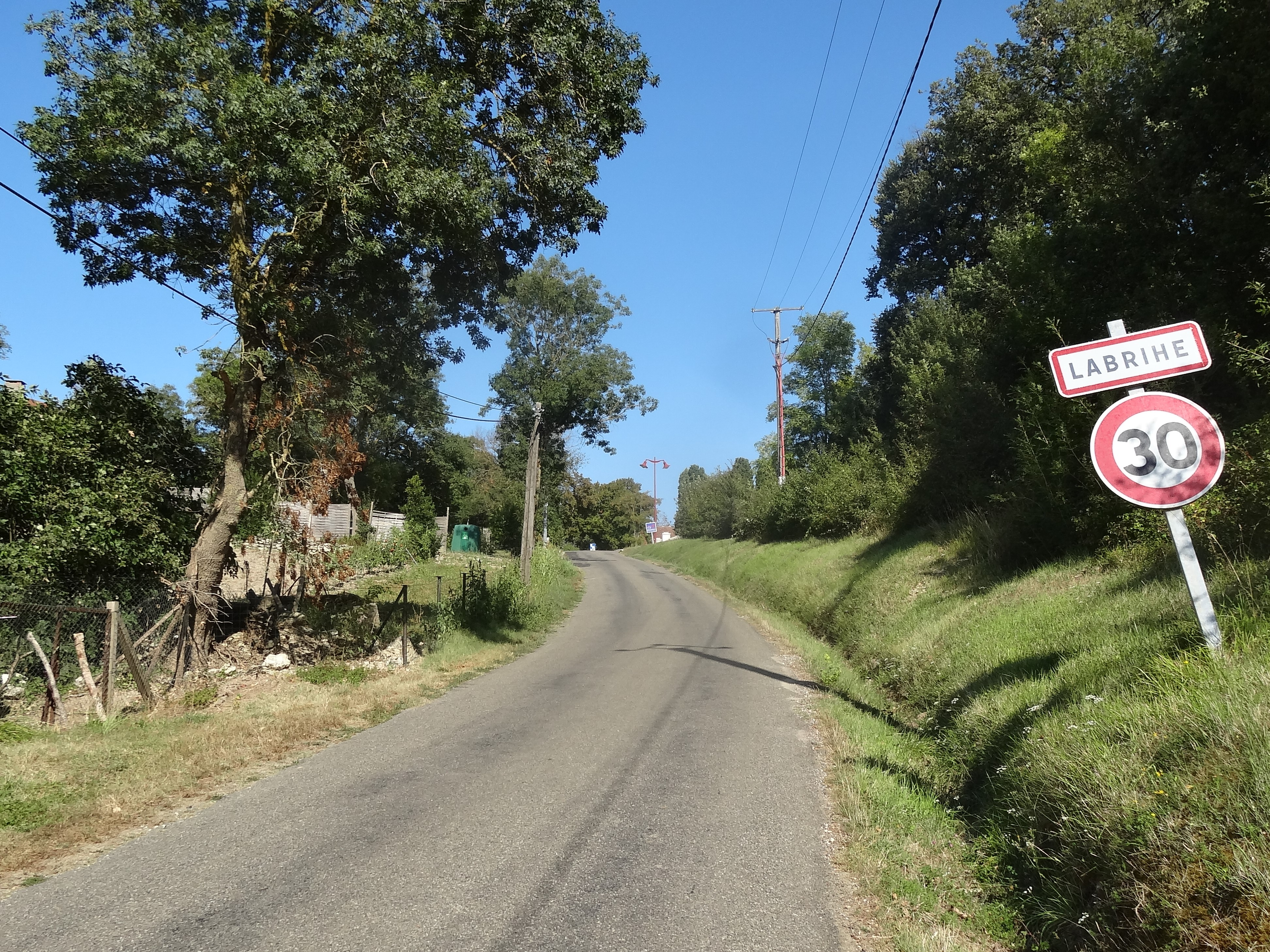
Western entrance to the village

== Heraldry ==
| Coat of arms of Labrihe | Tierced in reversed pairle: 1st azure with a sheaf of wheat or tied gules, 2nd argent with a lion gules armed, langued and crowned azure, 3rd gules with two keys argent in saltire and surmounted by a crown or. |

== Population ==
Historical population
| Year | Pop. | ±% p.a. |
|---|---|---|
| 1968 | 152 | — |
| 1975 | 142 | −0.97% |
| 1982 | 145 | +0.30% |
| 1990 | 136 | −0.80% |
| 1999 | 150 | +1.09% |
| 2007 | 205 | +3.98% |
| 2012 | 203 | −0.20% |
| 2017 | 209 | +0.58% |
| 2023 | 212 | +0.24% |
Source: INSEE

== See also ==
- Communes of the Gers department
