= Termes-d'Armagnac =

Termes d'Armagnac
- Commune
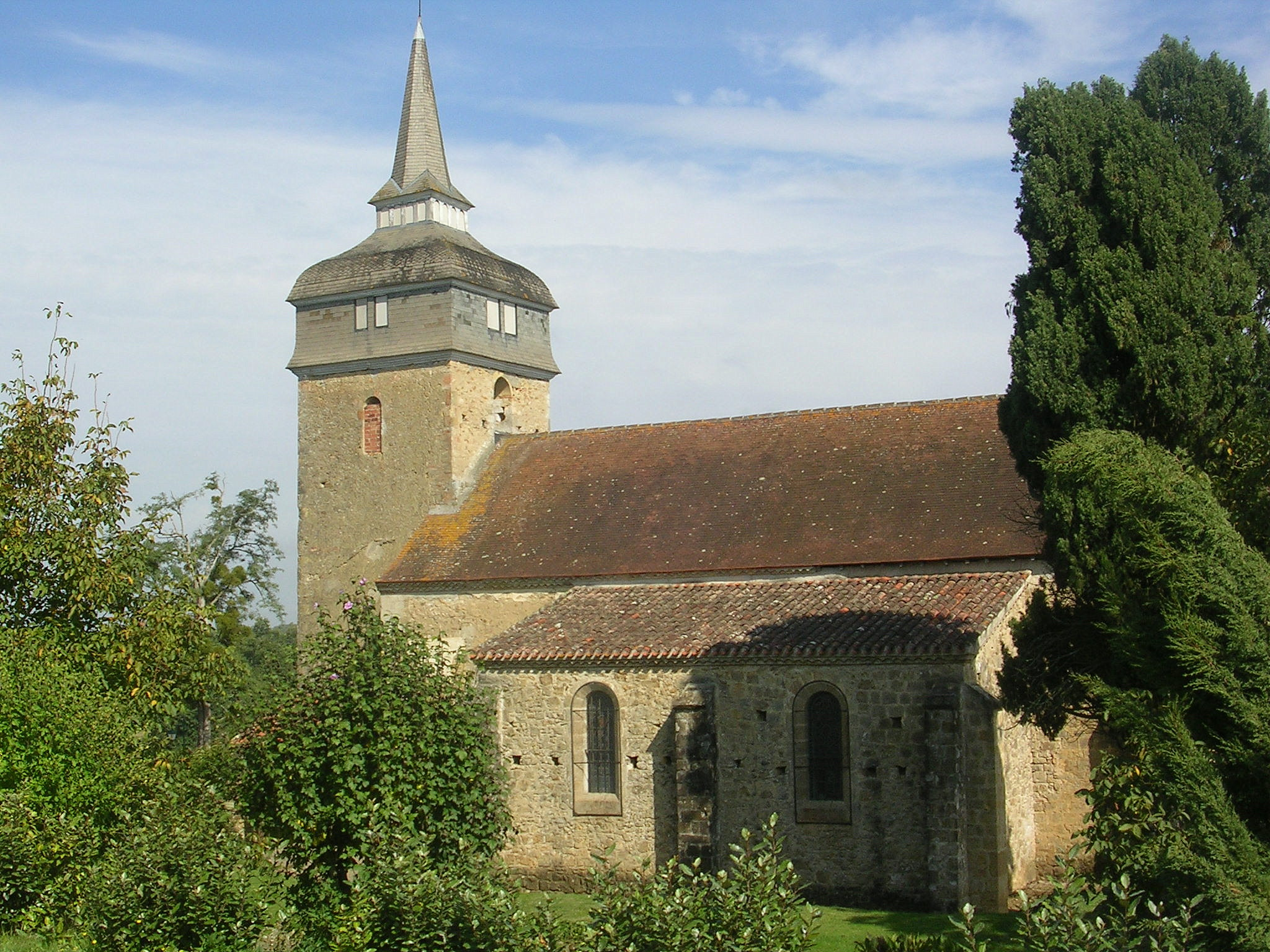
- The church in Termes-d'Armagnac

- Coat of arms
- Location of Termes d'Armagnac
- Location within France Location within Occitanie
- Coordinates: 43°40′19″N 0°00′34″W
- Country: France
- Region: Occitania
- Department: Gers
- Arrondissement: Mirande
- Canton: Adour-Gersoise

Government
  - Mayor (2020–2026): Thibault Renaudin
- Area^{1}: 10.05 km^{2} (3.88 sq mi)
- Highest elevation: 206 m (676 ft)
- Lowest elevation: 111 m (364 ft)
- Population (2023): 207
  - Density: 20.6/km^{2} (53.3/sq mi)
- Time zone: UTC+01:00 (CET)
  - Summer (DST): UTC+02:00 (CEST)
- INSEE/Postal code: 32443 /32400
- ^{1} French Land Register data, which excludes lakes, ponds, glaciers > 1 km^{2} (0.386 sq mi or 247 acres) and river estuaries.

Termes-d'Armagnac (French pronunciation: [tɛʁm daʁmaɲak], Termes of Armagnac; Gascon: Tèrmis d'Armanhac) is a commune in the Gers department in southwestern France.

== Geography ==
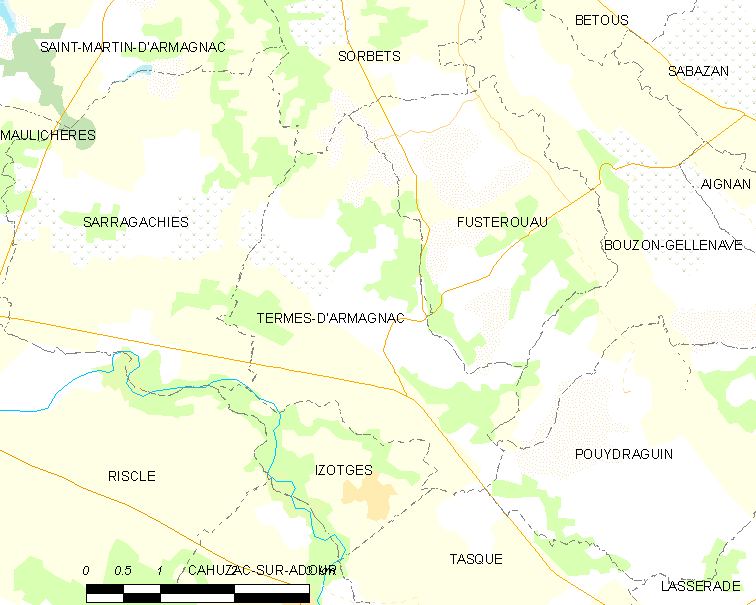
Termes-d'Armagnac and its surrounding communes

== Population ==
Historical population
Year	Pop.	±% p.a.
1968	213	—
1975	198	−1.04%
1982	192	−0.44%
1990	190	−0.13%
1999	215	+1.38%
2007	197	−1.09%
2012	183	−1.46%
2017	191	+0.86%
2023	207	+1.35%
Source: INSEE

== Notable people ==
- Thibault d'Armagnac (1405–1457), companion of Joan of Arc

== See also ==
- Communes of the Gers department
- Château de Thibault de Termes
