= Sainte-Mère =

- Commune
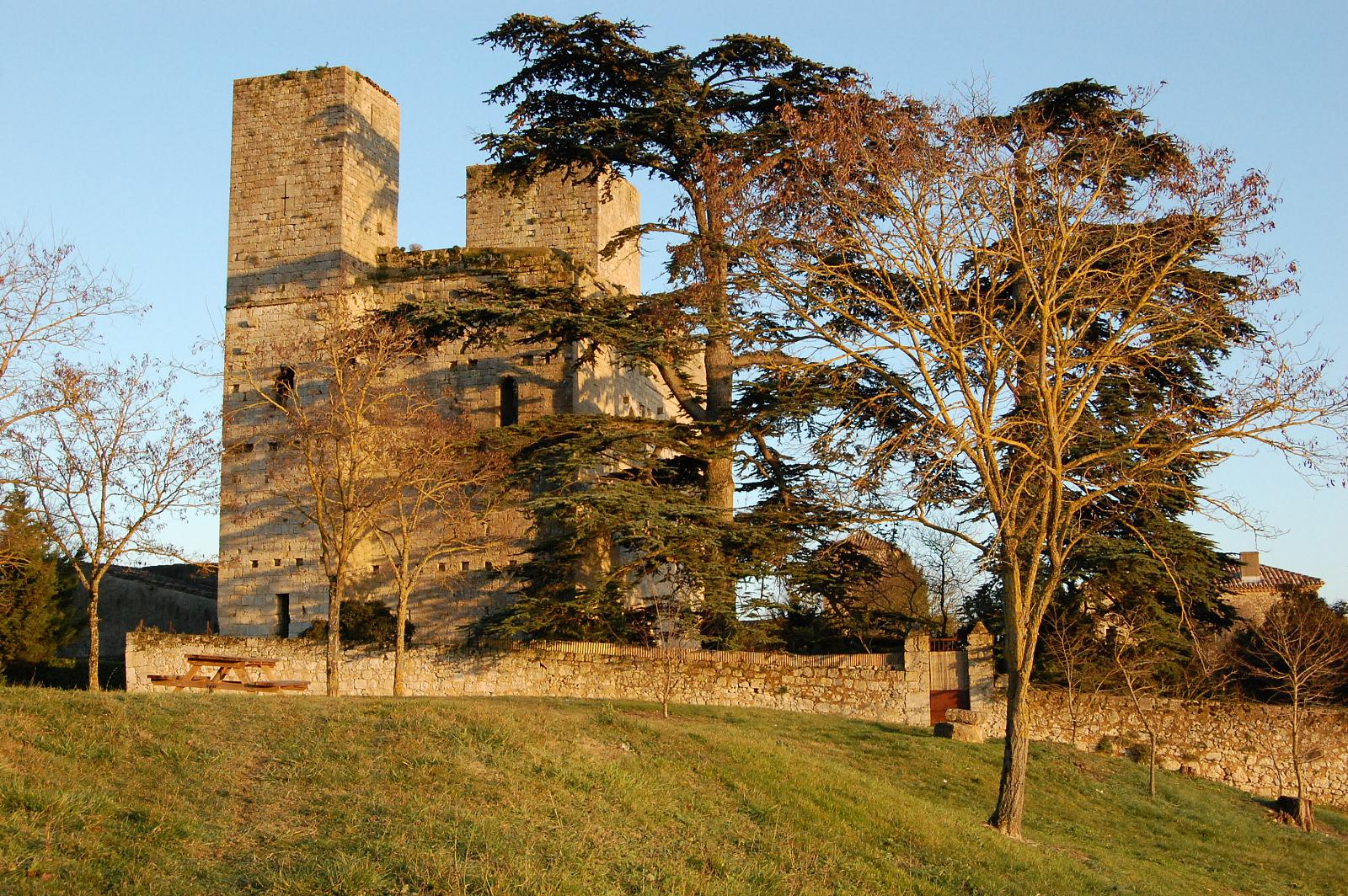
- Chateau

- Coat of arms
- Location of Sainte-Mère
- Location within France Location within Occitanie
- Coordinates: 44°00′20″N 0°40′14″E
- Country: France
- Region: Occitania
- Department: Gers
- Arrondissement: Condom
- Canton: Lectoure-Lomagne
- Intercommunality: Lomagne Gersoise

Government
  - Mayor (2020–2026): Philippe Battiston
- Area^{1}: 9.43 km^{2} (3.64 sq mi)
- Elevation: 172 m (564 ft)
- Highest elevation: 189 m (620 ft)
- Lowest elevation: 95 m (312 ft)
- Population (2023): 200
  - Density: 21/km^{2} (55/sq mi)
- Time zone: UTC+01:00 (CET)
  - Summer (DST): UTC+02:00 (CEST)
- INSEE/Postal code: 32395 /32700
- ^{1} French Land Register data, which excludes lakes, ponds, glaciers > 1 km^{2} (0.386 sq mi or 247 acres) and river estuaries.

Sainte-Mère (French pronunciation: [sɛ̃t mɛʁ]; Occitan: Senta Mèra) is a commune in the Gers department in southwestern France.

== Geography ==
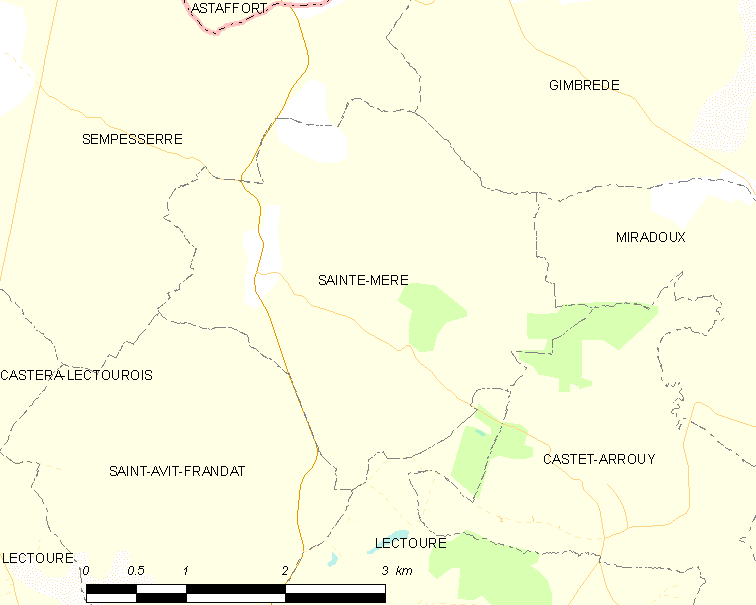
Sainte-Mère and its surrounding communes

== Population ==
Historical population
Year	Pop.	±% p.a.
1968	205	—
1975	197	−0.57%
1982	173	−1.84%
1990	172	−0.07%
1999	182	+0.63%
2007	193	+0.74%
2012	207	+1.41%
2017	215	+0.76%
2023	200	−1.20%
Source: INSEE

== See also ==
- Communes of the Gers department
