= Homps, Gers =

Homps
- Commune
- Coat of arms
- Location of Homps
- Location within France Location within Occitanie
- Coordinates: 43°48′37″N 0°51′04″E
- Country: France
- Region: Occitania
- Department: Gers
- Arrondissement: Condom
- Canton: Gimone-Arrats

Government
  - Mayor (2020–2026): Patrick Simorre
- Area^{1}: 9.24 km^{2} (3.57 sq mi)
- Elevation: 115 m (377 ft)
- Highest elevation: 193 m (633 ft)
- Lowest elevation: 105 m (344 ft)
- Population (2023): 109
  - Density: 11.8/km^{2} (30.6/sq mi)
- Time zone: UTC+01:00 (CET)
  - Summer (DST): UTC+02:00 (CEST)
- INSEE/Postal code: 32154 /32120
- ^{1} French Land Register data, which excludes lakes, ponds, glaciers > 1 km^{2} (0.386 sq mi or 247 acres) and river estuaries.

Homps (French pronunciation: [ɔ̃ps]; Occitan: Oms) is a commune in the Gers department in southwestern France.

== Geography ==
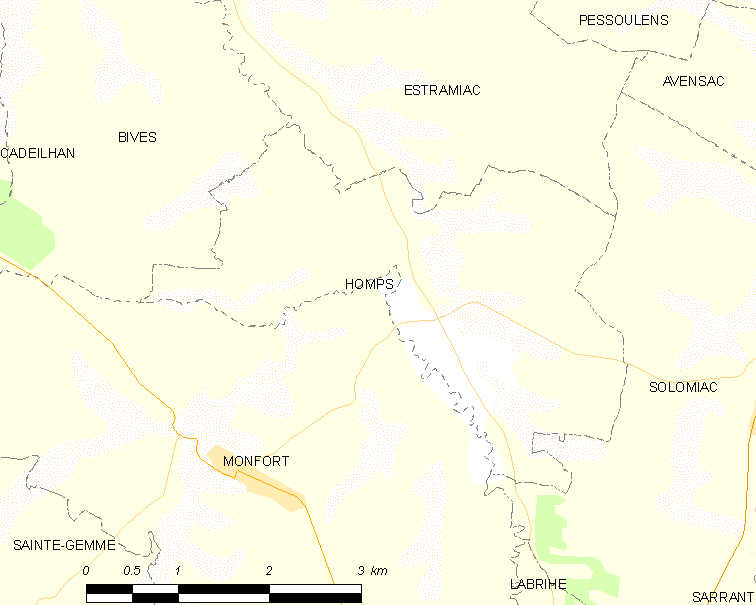
Homps and its surrounding communes

== Population ==
Historical population
Year	Pop.	±% p.a.
1968	144	—
1975	121	−2.46%
1982	115	−0.72%
1990	95	−2.36%
1999	86	−1.10%
2007	93	+0.98%
2012	109	+3.23%
2017	104	−0.93%
2023	109	+0.79%
Source: INSEE

== See also ==
- Château d'Homps
- Communes of the Gers department
