= Château de Calberte =

Castle in Occitania, France

Coordinates: 44°13′35″N 3°49′00″E

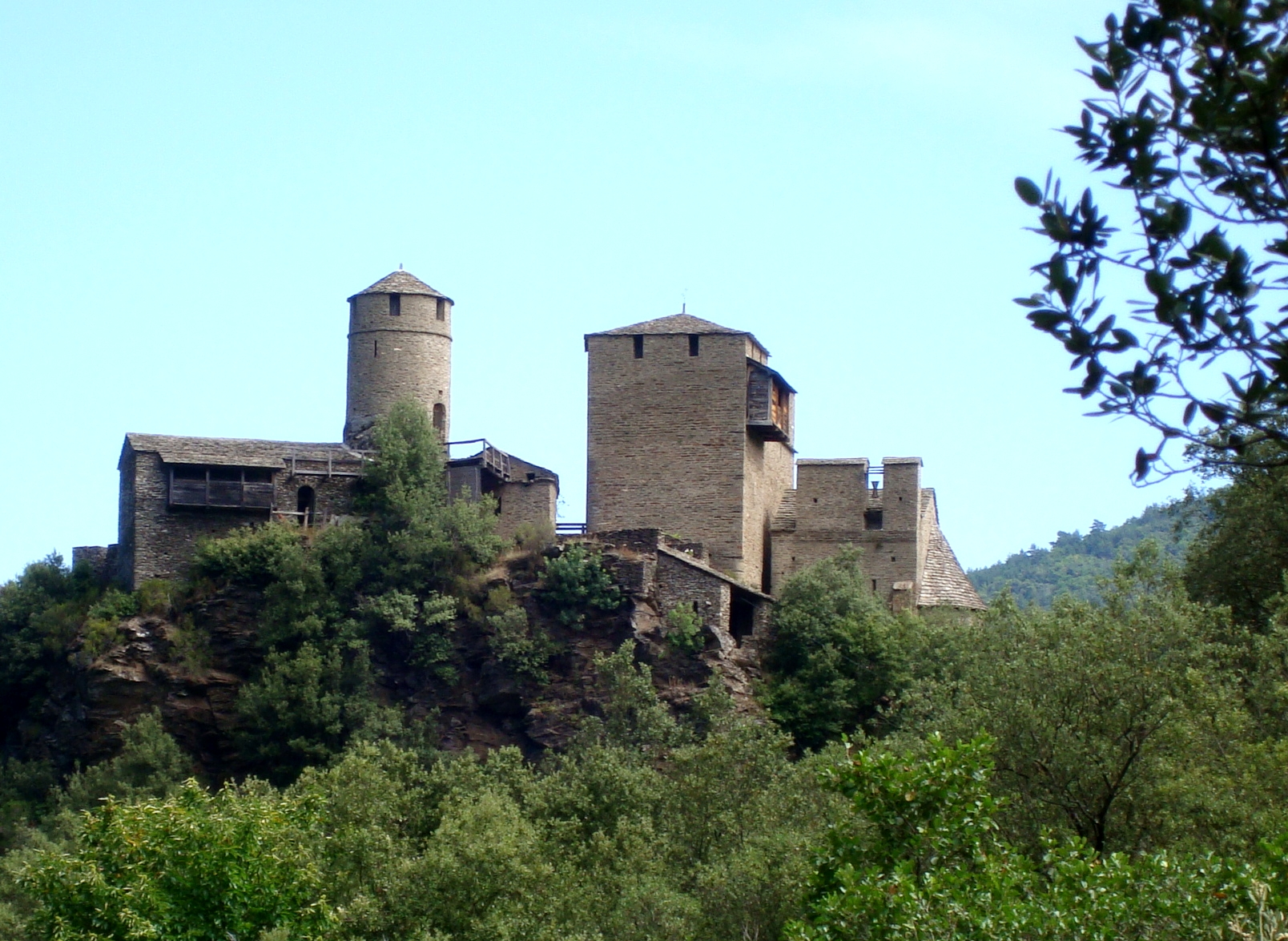

The Château de Calberte, or Château Saint-Pierre, is a castle in the commune of Saint-Germain-de-Calberte in the Lozère département of France.

== Location ==
The castle is situated in the heart of the Cévennes, in the former province of Gévaudan. It stands at an altitude of 410 metres (1,350 ft) on a rock outcrop on the banks of the Gardon. It is 1 kilometre (0.62 mi) below the present village at the bottom of the valley.

== Description ==
The castle is composed of several buildings.

The square keep, 11 metres (36 ft) high, dates from the 12th century. An older rectangular dwelling is attached to it. It has two levels, and in the 14th century were added merlons, battlements and a bretèche above its door. Four outbuildings, a round tower and a castral chapel complete it. A first small enceinte isolates the buildings of the castle from those of the medieval village located below on the north side. This village is itself surrounded by a second enceinte which encloses everything. The main access is through the northeast gate

The adjoining village included about fifteen houses (or a hundred inhabitants). The houses that have been excavated all had two levels (ground floor for animals, first floor for residents). They had double-pitched roofs covered with slate. The streets had a drainage system for runoff water. The excavations carried out there were able to determine that they essentially housed a metallurgical activity (slag, hearths, disposal).

== History ==
The construction of the castle would have started in the 11th century, but it took its current dimensions in the 12th century. It was then a possession of the lords of Anduze, who held the Baronnies of Portes. Having taken the side of their suzerain, the Count of Toulouse, their property including this castle was confiscated by the King of France around 1229, at the end of the Albigensian Crusade. But the Bishop of Mende and the king disputed for a long time the possession of the region. A first agreement in 1265 gave it to the king. In 1307, after 36 years of legal processes between them, the act of paréage (treaty) gave it to him definitively. The castle remained the direct property of the Barons de Portes until 1320 when Raymond de Cadoène bought it from them and paid tribute to them for it. The castle nevertheless underwent the vicissitudes of the lordship of Portes.

In 1322, it was sold by Guillaume de Randon to the Budos family. Being originally from Guyenne, they therefore generally took the side of the English during the Hundred Years' War. This earned them the confiscation of the barony by the king in 1340. He sold it in 1344 to William II Roger de Beaufort. The Treaty of Brétigny in 1360 cancelled the confiscations of 1340. The lordship of Porte was then contested by two legitimate lords. A 24-year long private war pitted the Budos and Guillaume III Roger de Beaufort over the possession. It ended in March 1384 when the parliament voted in favour of Thibaud de Budos.

Like most castles in the region, Calberte probably suffered the threat of mercenary free companies during the Hundred Years' War.

The castle was probably abandoned at the beginning of the 15th century although the reasons are unknown, and it gradually sank into oblivion. The abandonment of the village which was attached to the castle was earlier: between the end of the 13th century and the middle of the 14th century. Its ruins served as a refuge during the French Wars of Religion (late 16th century) as well as during the Camisard War. In the 20th century, under the name of Château Saint-Pierre, the Calbertois designated the remains of the castle, now largely ruined.

=== Restoration ===
It became the property of the Darnas family in 1964. They decided to restore it themselves little by little, over the school holidays, despite the magnitude of the task, which was very difficult to access (transportation of materials on human backs) and general scepticism. The work spread over almost 40 years (the labour and the work of a lifetime), to the great astonishment of the Calbertois.

The difficulty of access to the castle (only by a path) and its isolation had saved it from being used as a quarry like many abandoned buildings, and the basic material (shale stones) remained on site. The restoration of each building was preceded by an exhaustive study by M. Darnas (research of dimensions, of all traces to find its structure, its form, its details such as battlements). The reconstruction of the walls from the fallen stones made it possible to expose the base of the buildings thus preserved. Only the sections of walls remaining from the round tower, too damaged, had to be torn down. The only concession to modernity was that cement replaced lime and mortar gave way to a simple jointing.

Archaeological digs, carried out by the medievalist Isabelle Darnas (the daughter of the family), made it possible to understand the site's evolution and to gain a better understanding of what it was. These studies and the fact that its structures have been very little altered over the centuries allowed a very faithful restoration. Only very careful observation can distinguish the original parts and those reconstructed.

Today, the castle is almost entirely restored. Visitor fees in summer make it possible to finance the clearing work.

In summer, an exhibition retraces the restoration work as well as the results of the excavations. Its owner, a goldsmith, also presents his work there.

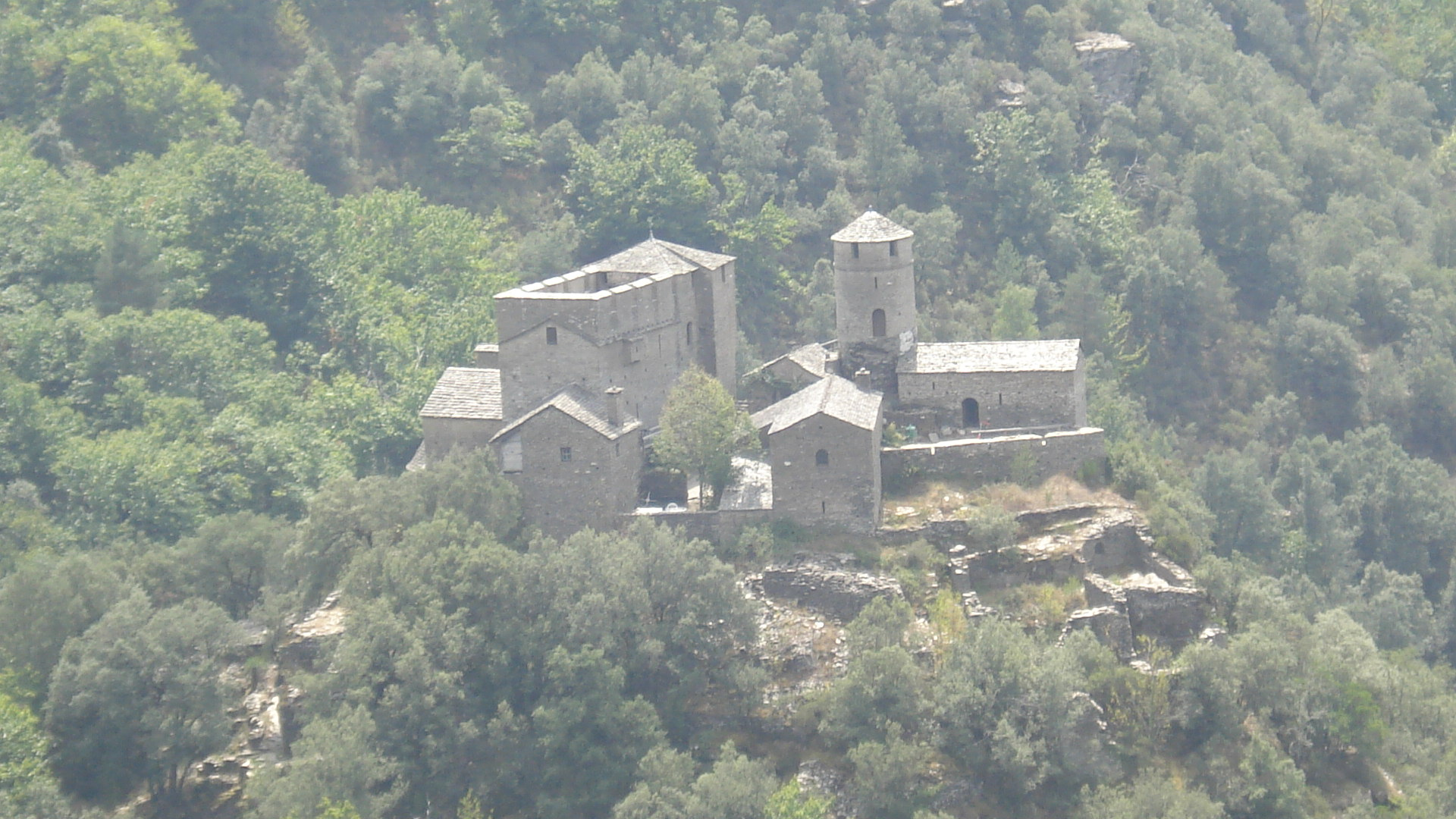
View from the north west

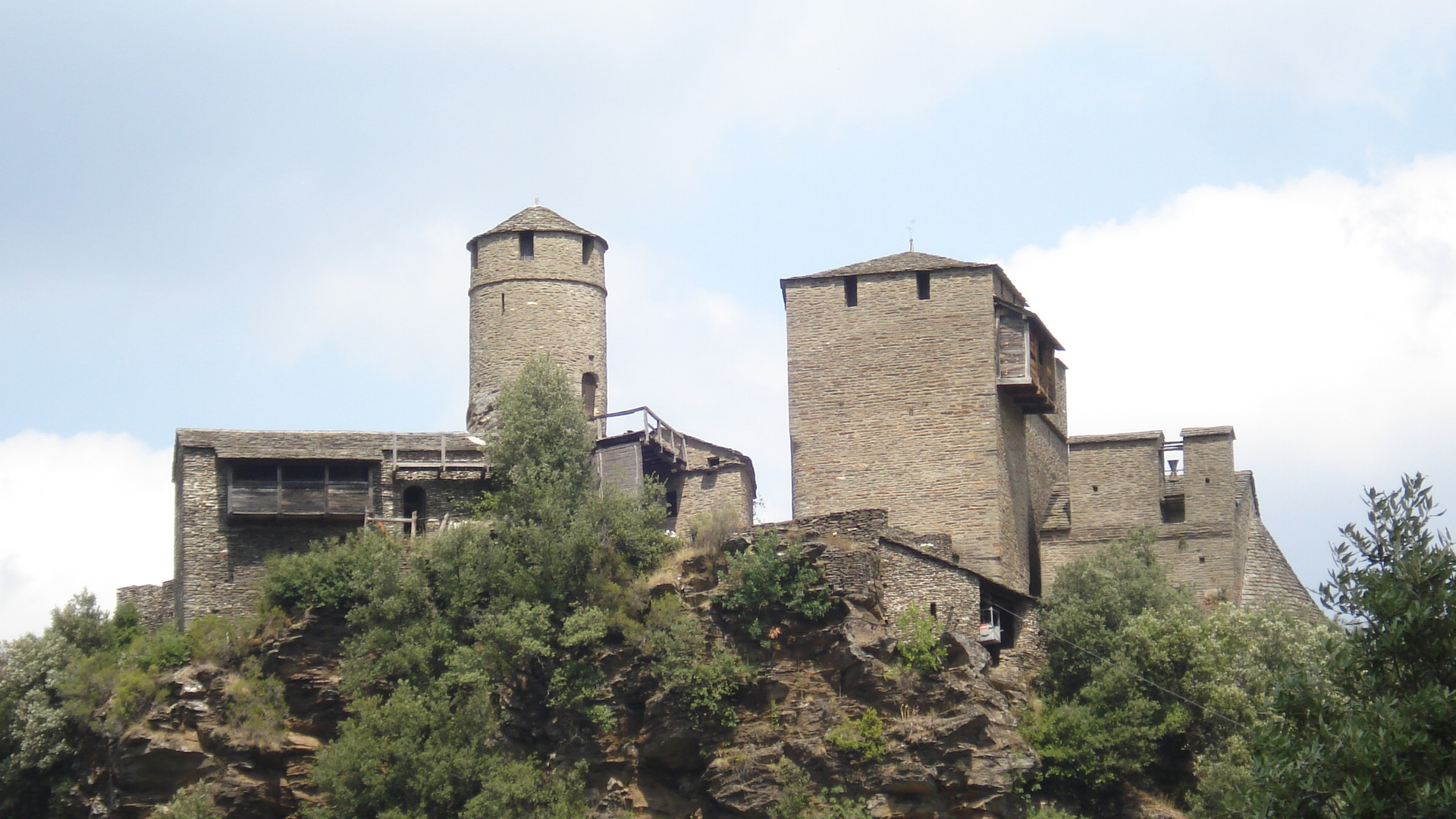
View from the access path

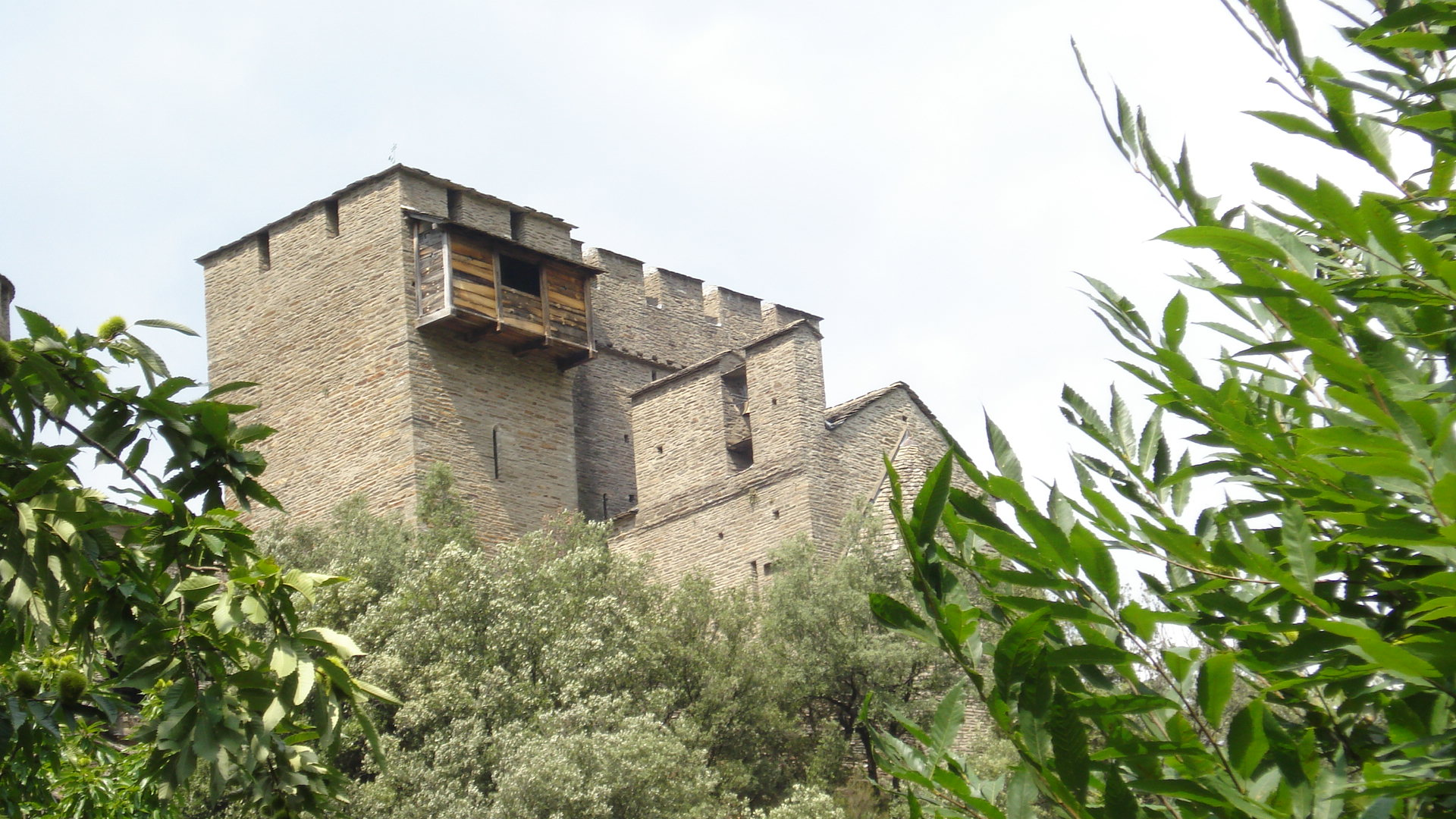
View of the keep and chapel from the access path

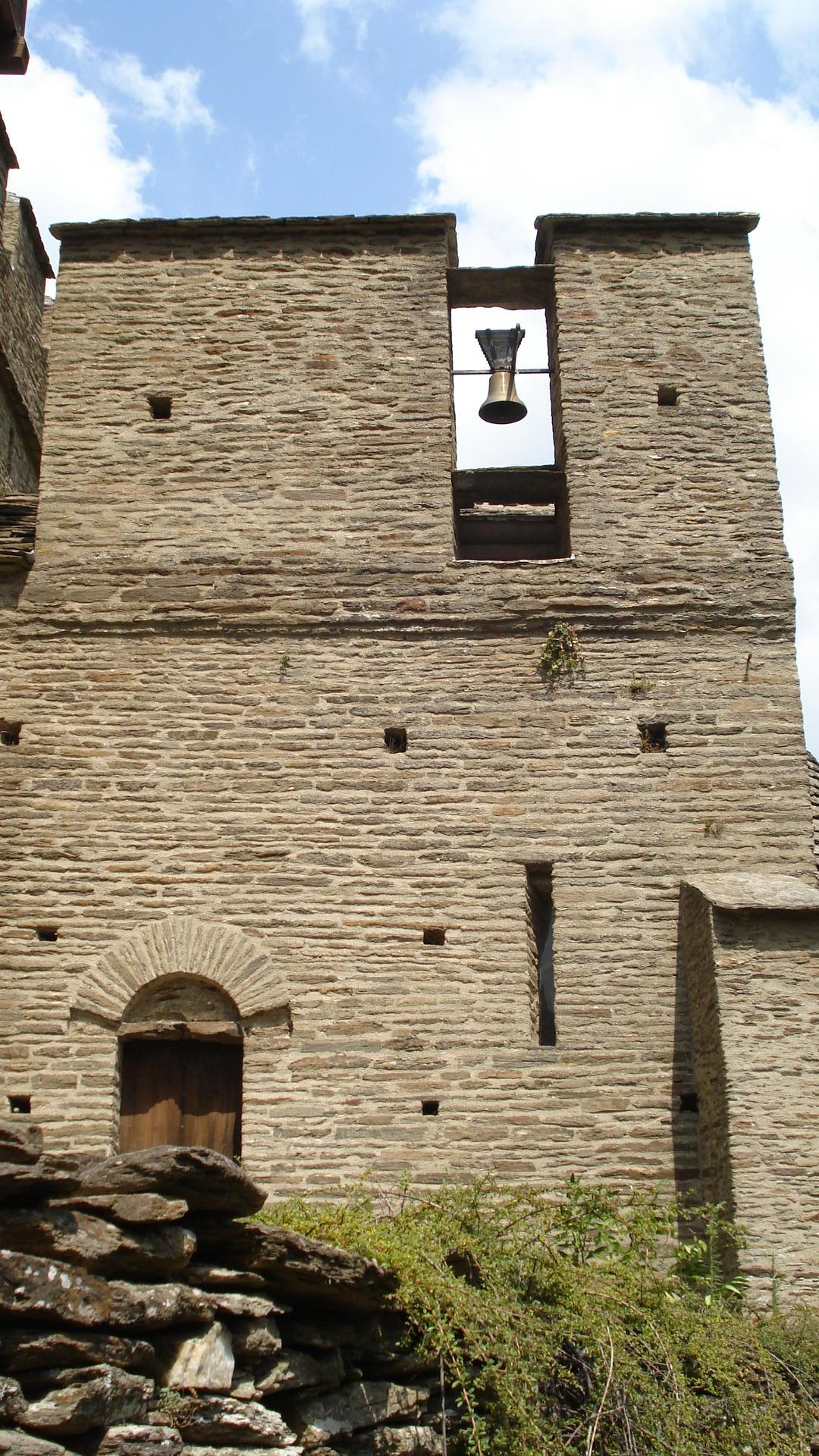
Chapel entrance

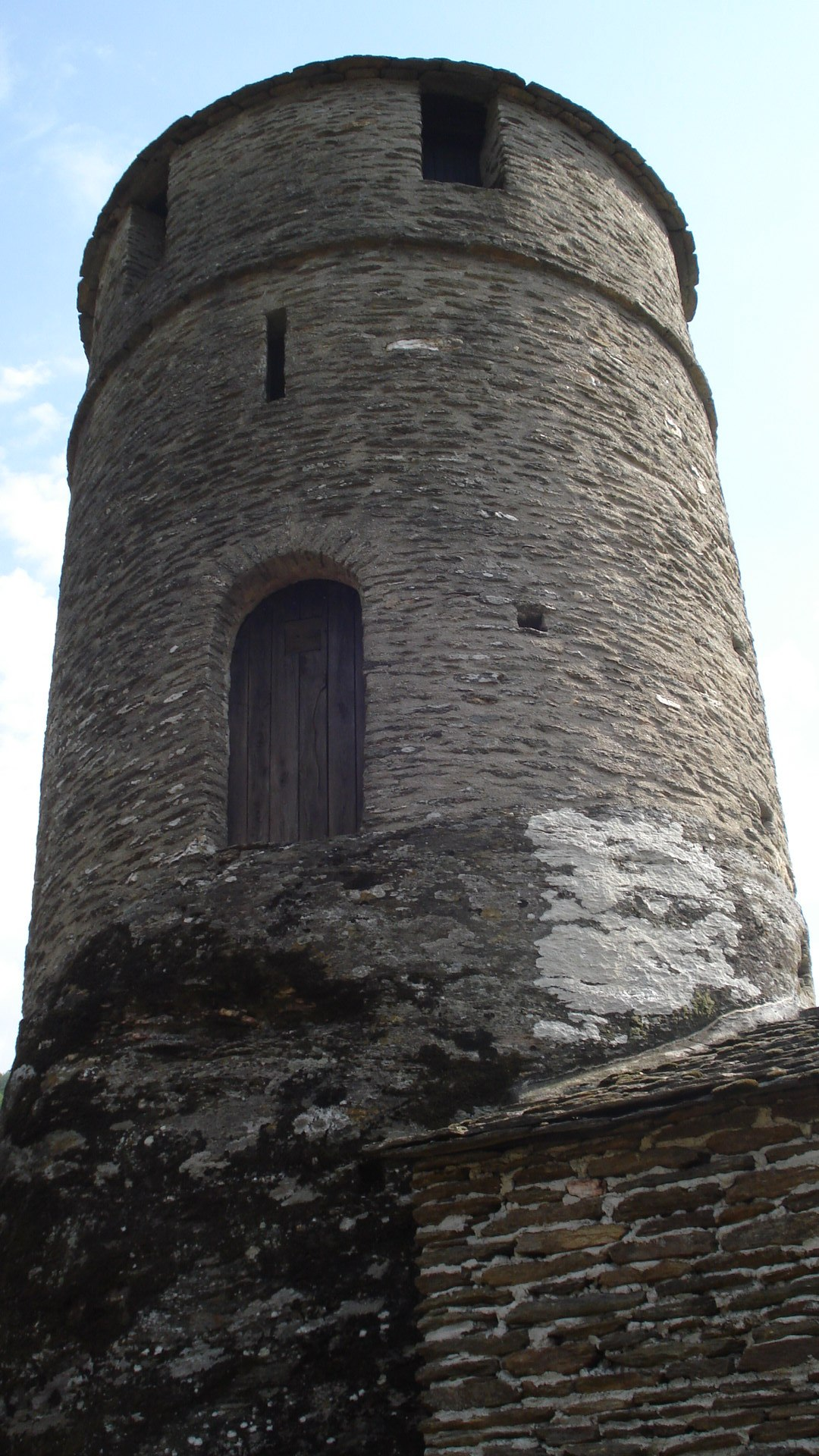
The round tower

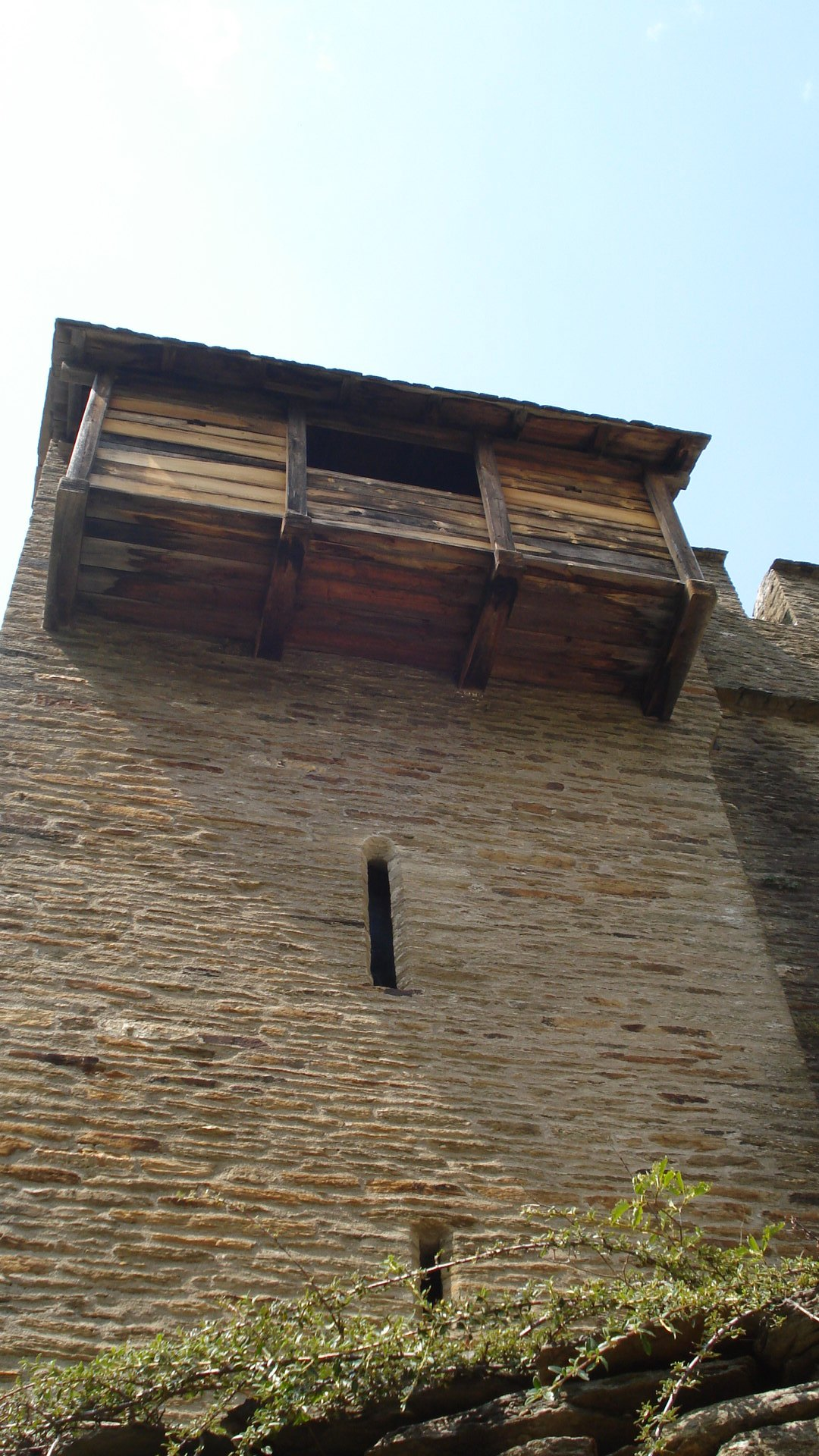
East side of the keep and its horading

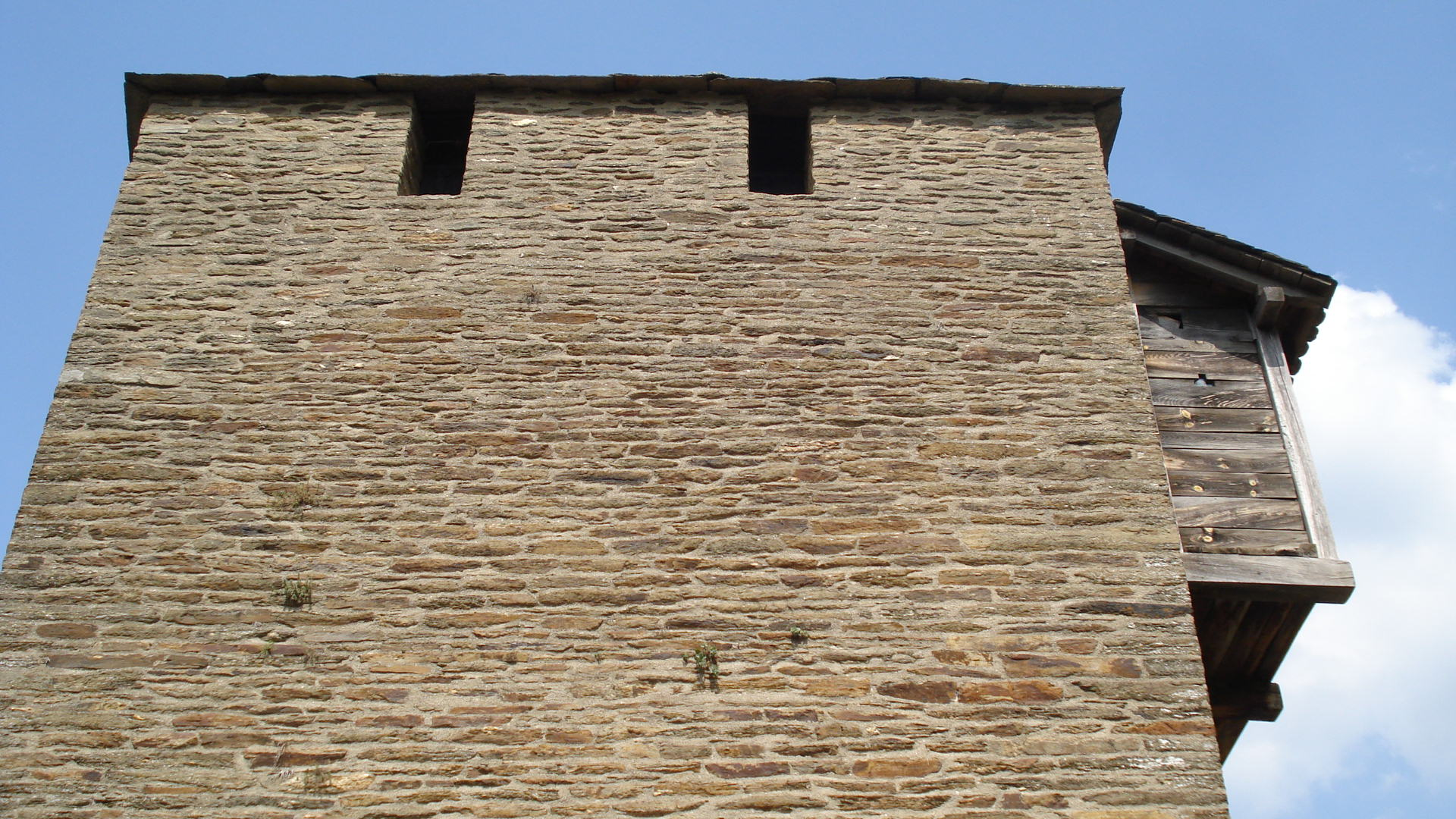
South side of the keep

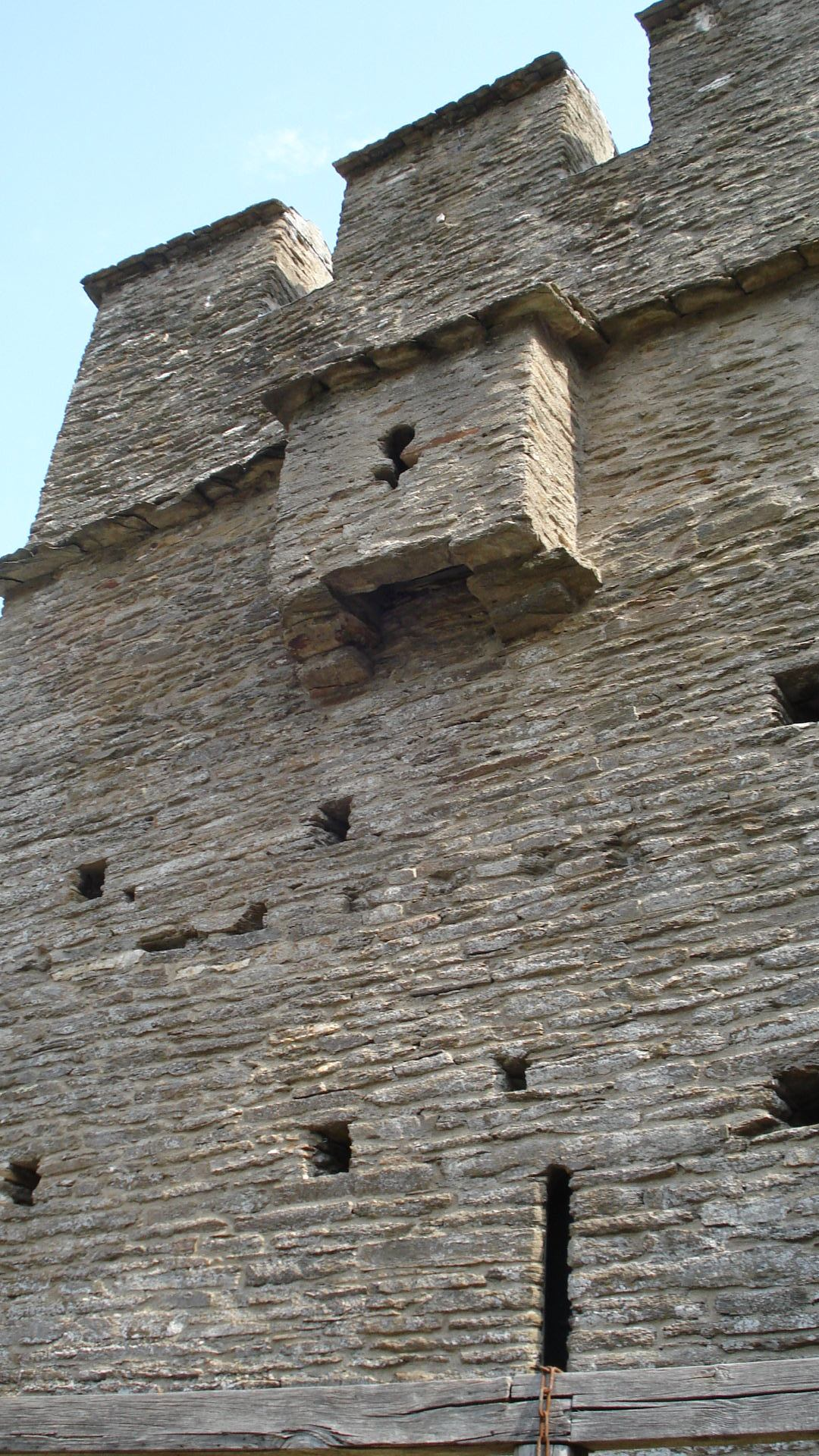
The battlements and the bretèche of the residence

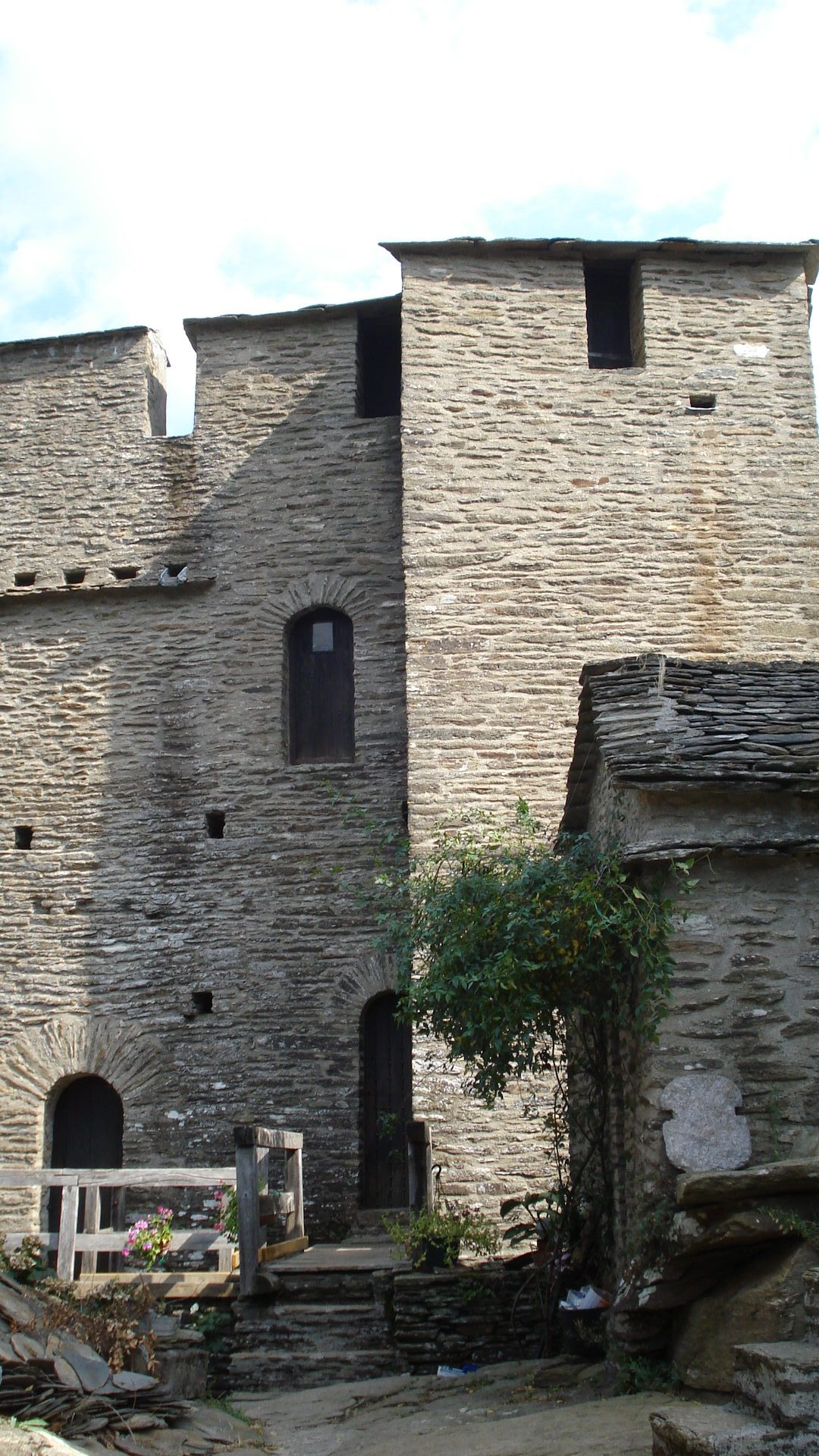
The courtyard

== See also ==
- List of castles in France

== Bibliography ==
- Isabelle Darnas (2009). Châteaux Médiévaux en Cévennes (in French). Le Pompidou: ASFP éditions. ISBN 978-2-9531785-1-7.
- Lucien Goillon (1989). Si m'était conté Saint-Etienne en Cévenne : Notes d'histoire sur Saint-Étienne-Vallée-Française (in French). Nîmes: Lacour. p. 174. ISBN 2-9503675-0-X.
