= Château de Budos =

Ruined castle in Nouvelle-Aquitaine, France

Coordinates: 44°32′19″N 0°22′58″W

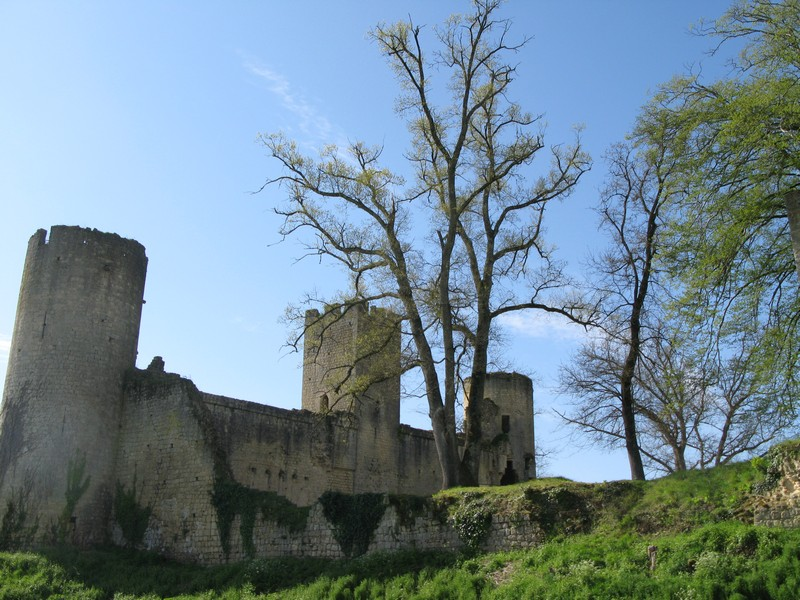
The Château de Budos

The Château de Budos is a ruined castle north of the village of Budos, in the Gironde département of France.

== History ==
The Château de Budos is largely the work of Raymond Guilhem de Budos, nephew of Pope Clement V. Originally built by his uncle, he remodelled it from 1306, the old family castle taking on the architectural layout of the neighbouring castle, the Château de Villandraut.

In 1422–23, the English king Henry VI took possession of the castle and put it in the charge of Pons, lord of Castillon. Around 1433, Henry conceded the lands and castle to his son, the Duke of Gloucester. In 1446–47, Budos was given to the Count of Foix, following the death of Gloucester. After the conquest of Guyenne (Aquitaine), the Budos family, having supported the cause of the French crown, regained possession of its seigneuries in Guyenne. In 1652, the cavalry captain Lasserre seized Budos which he sacked and pillaged and burnt the archives. The seigneury of Budos stayed in the family of La Roque until the French Revolution. In 1825, the castle was sold as national property. In 1851, the Gironde Commission of Historic Monuments was informed of the castle. They learned at the same time that stones originating from the castle had been sold to a builder by the state.

== Architecture ==
The castle is rectangular in plan. A vast U-shaped building range around the courtyard is protected by a high wall contained by towers at the corners. Entry is made through a high square tower. On each face, a non-projecting square tower dominates the curtain wall and the buildings. The north-east curtain wall seems to have been raised several times. The crenellations of the first round-walk have been filled in.

The ground level appears flat today thanks to embankments which have been placed there. Originally, the ground sloped and the architecture provides evidence of the different levels.

The Château de Budos has been classified since 1988 as a monument historique by the French Ministry of Culture.

== See also ==
- List of castles in France
