= Budos =

- Commune
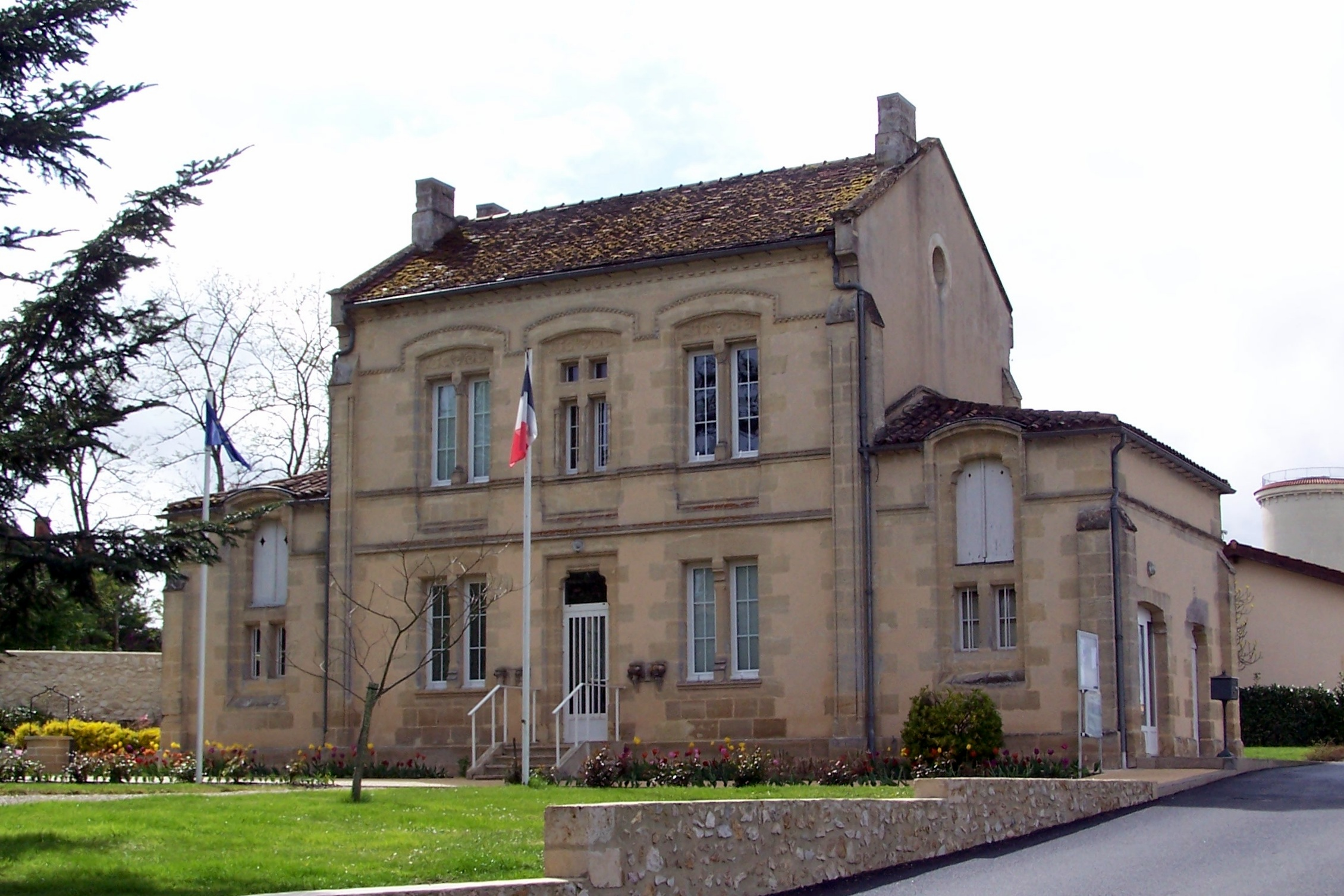
- Town hall

- Coat of arms
- Location of Budos
- Location within France Location within Nouvelle-Aquitaine
- Coordinates: 44°32′03″N 0°23′03″W
- Country: France
- Region: Nouvelle-Aquitaine
- Department: Gironde
- Arrondissement: Langon
- Canton: Les Landes des Graves
- Intercommunality: Convergence Garonne

Government
  - Mayor (2020–2026): Didier Charlot
- Area^{1}: 21.1 km^{2} (8.1 sq mi)
- Elevation: 65 m (213 ft)
- Highest elevation: 70 m (230 ft)
- Lowest elevation: 12 m (39 ft)
- Population (2023): 823
  - Density: 39.0/km^{2} (101/sq mi)
- Time zone: UTC+01:00 (CET)
  - Summer (DST): UTC+02:00 (CEST)
- INSEE/Postal code: 33076 /33720
- ^{1} French Land Register data, which excludes lakes, ponds, glaciers > 1 km^{2} (0.386 sq mi or 247 acres) and river estuaries.

Budos (French pronunciation: [bydɔs]; Gascon: Budòs) is a commune in the Gironde department in Nouvelle-Aquitaine in southwestern France.

== Culture and sights ==
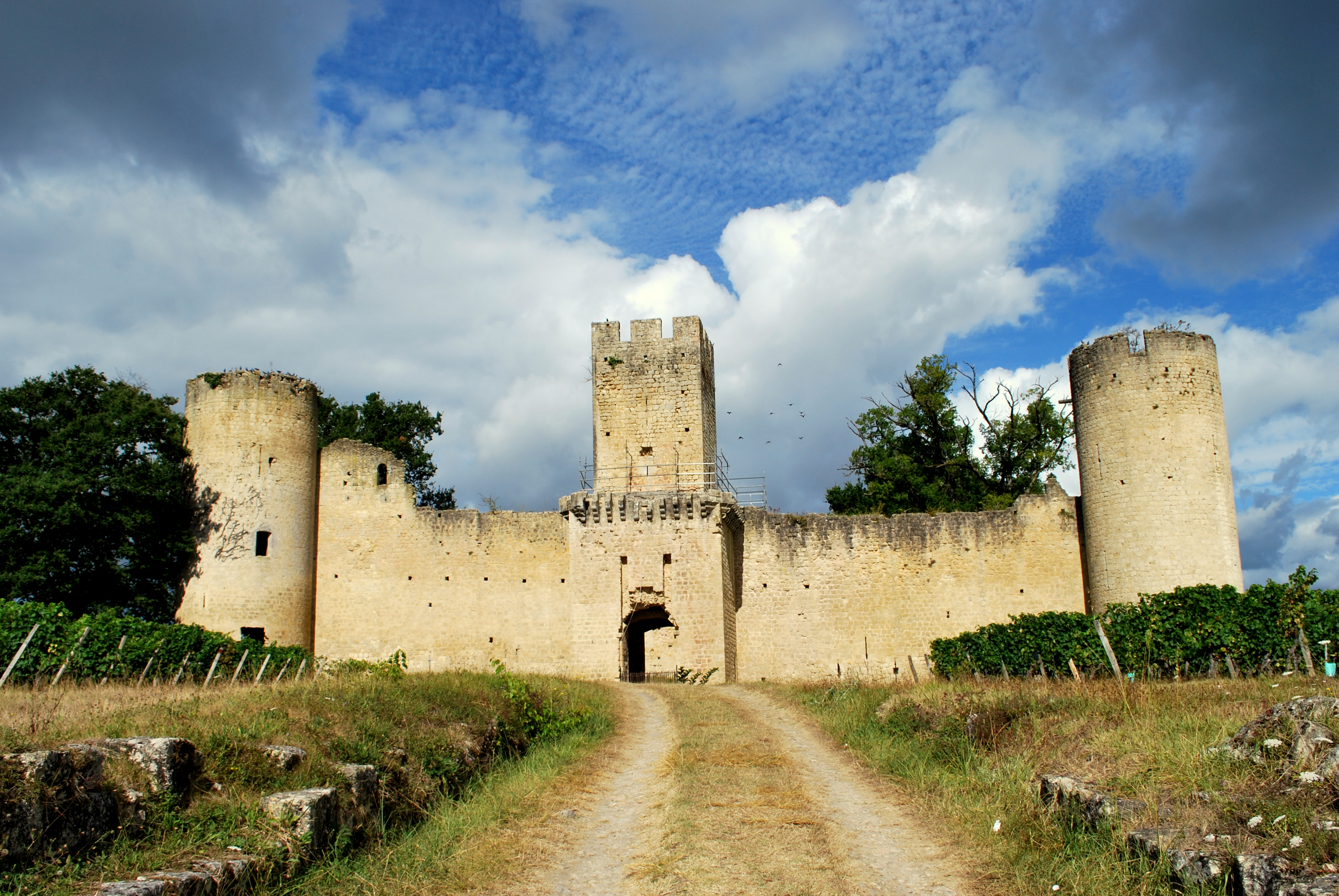
Château de Budos

- The ruins of Château de Budos, a 14th-century castle. It was built by Raymond Guilhem de Budos, nephew of Pope Clement V, shortly after the construction of Château de Villandraut in 1305. The castle played an important role in the Hundred Years' War, the French Wars of Religion and The Fronde. Every year, festivals with different themes are held within its walls.
- The 12th-16th century church of Saint-Romain.

== Population ==
Historical population
Year	Pop.	±% p.a.
1968	531	—
1975	491	−1.11%
1982	548	+1.58%
1990	666	+2.47%
1999	629	−0.63%
2007	686	+1.09%
2012	725	+1.11%
2017	787	+1.65%
2023	823	+0.75%
Source: INSEE

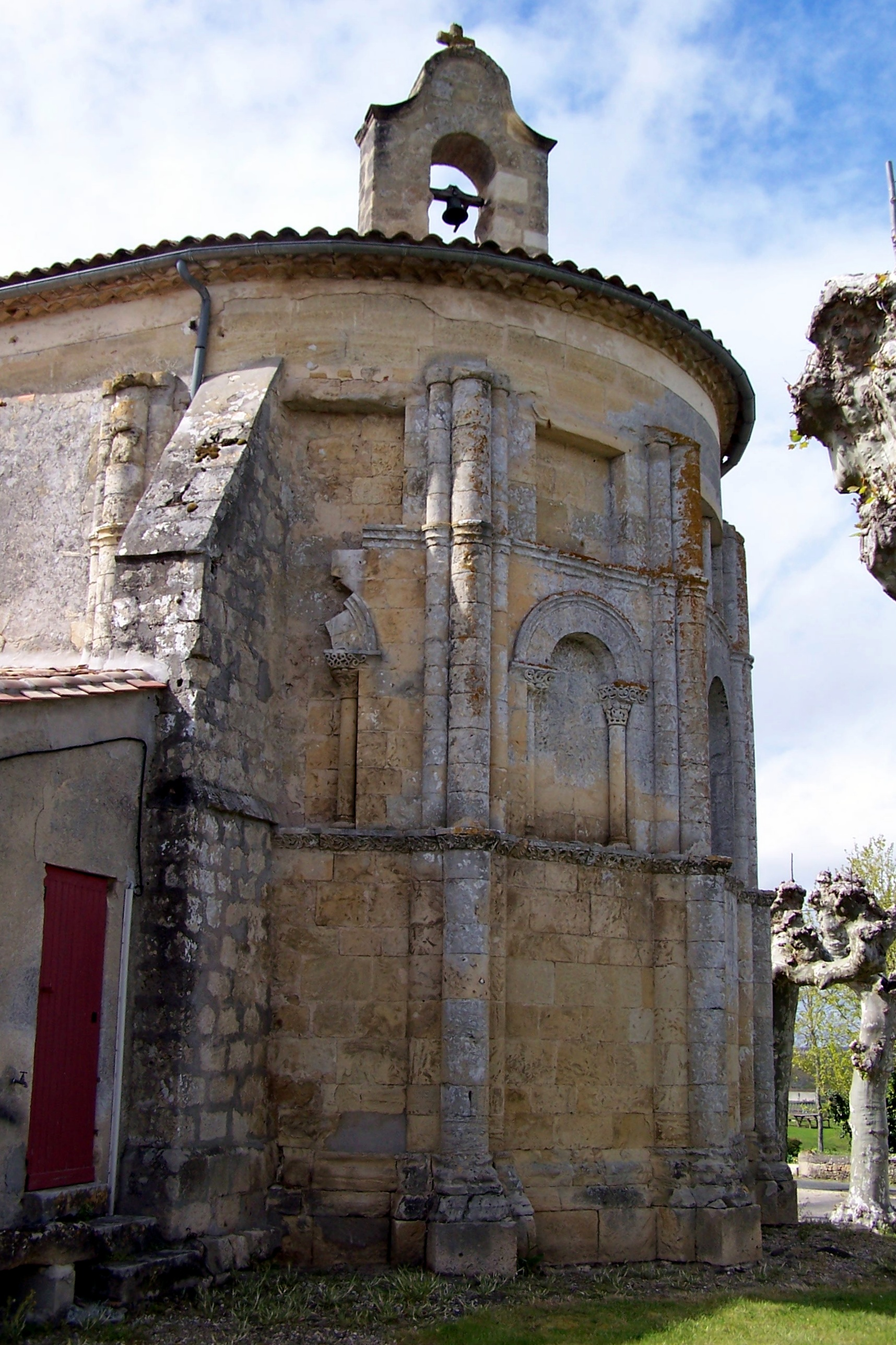
The Romanesque apse of the church of Saint-Romain.

== See also ==
- Communes of the Gironde department
