= Château de Villerouge-Termenès =

Ruined castle in Occitania, France

Coordinates: 43°00′24″N 2°37′36″E

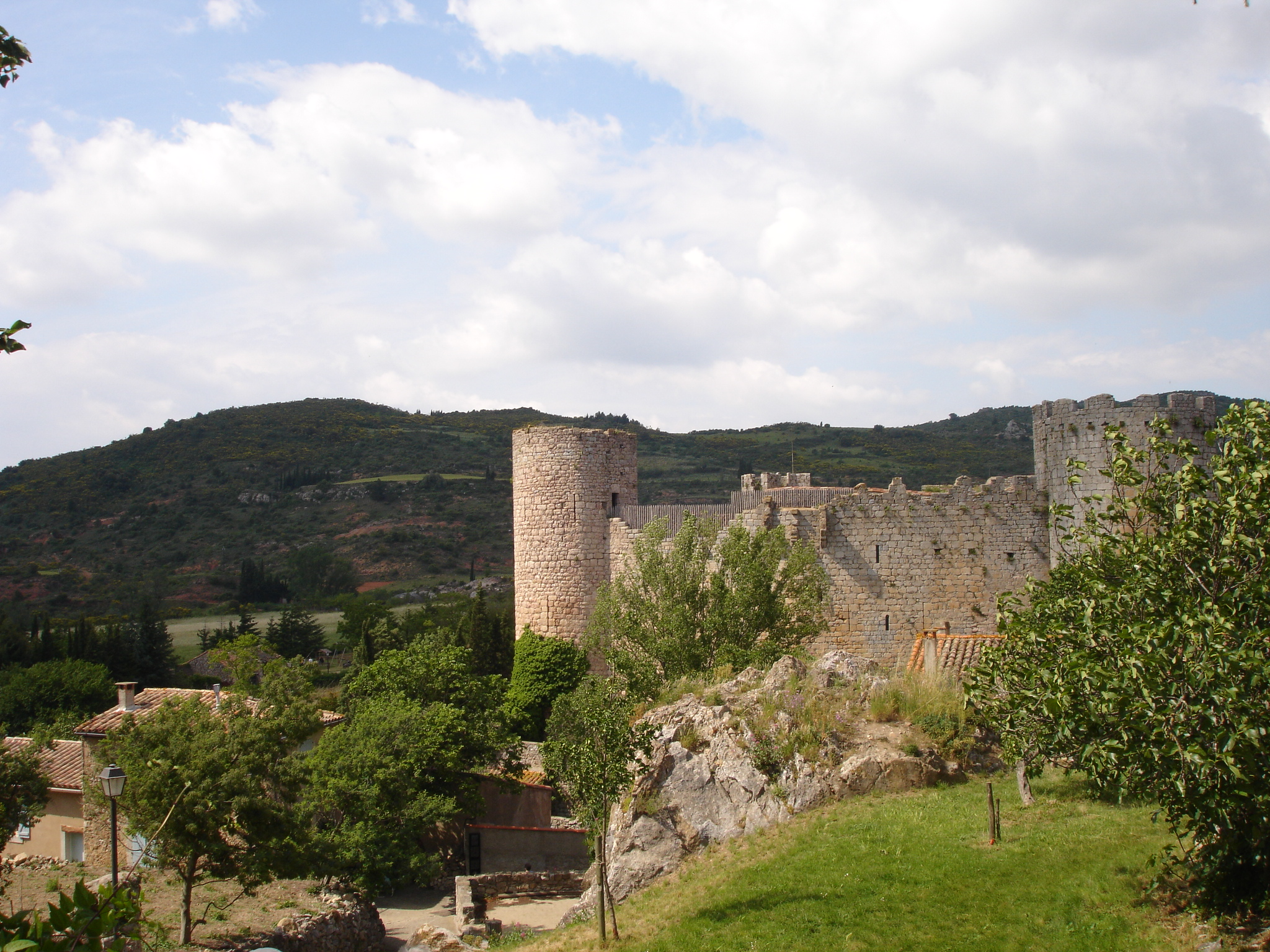
Château de Villerouge-Termenès

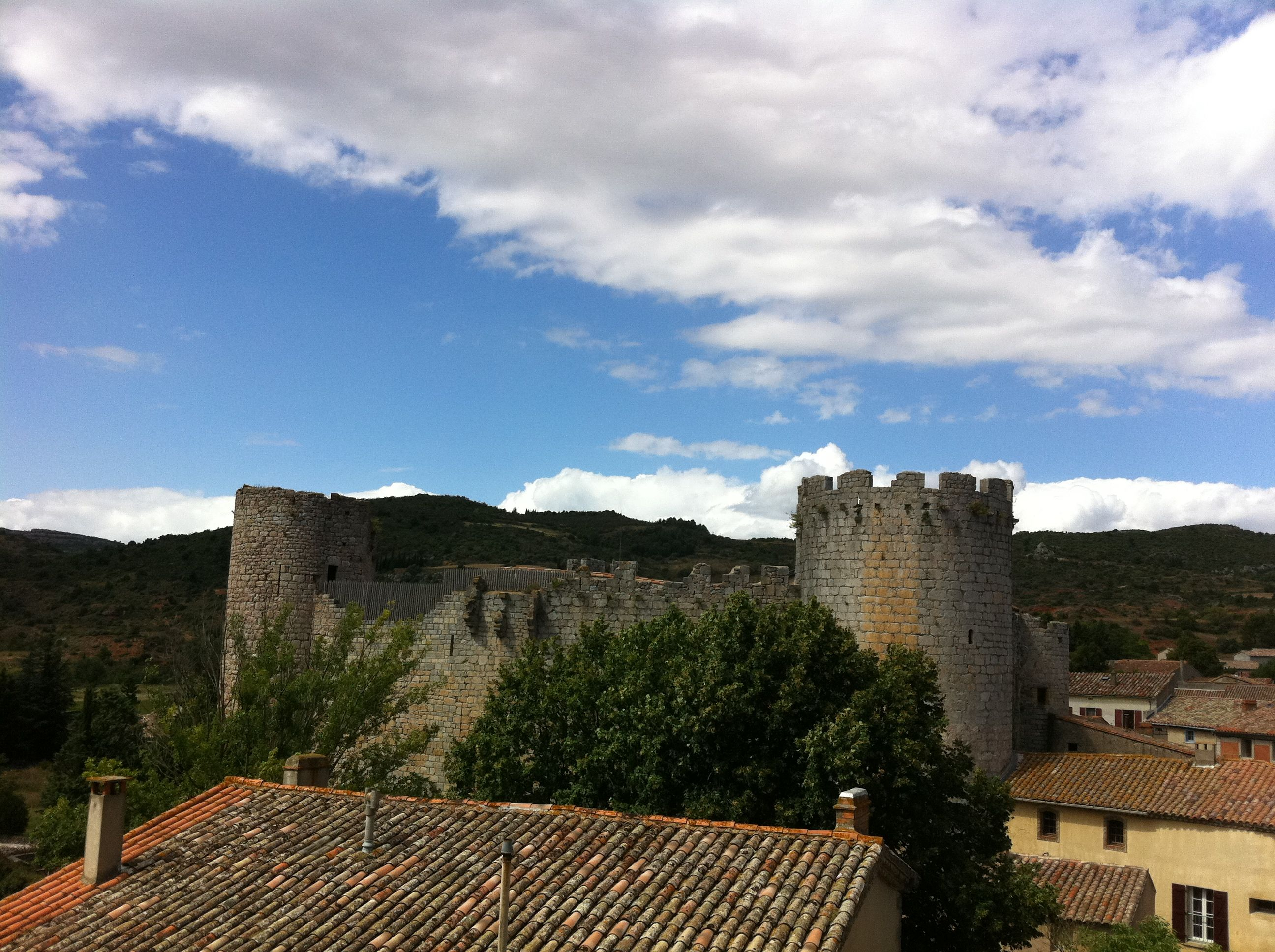
Château de Villerouge-Termenès

The Château de Villerouge-Termenès (Languedocien: Castèl de Vilaroja de Termenés) is a ruined castle in the commune of Villerouge-Termenès in the Aude département of France, situated in the Corbières Massif.

== History ==
From 1110 until the French Revolution, the castle and village belonged to the Archbishops of Narbonne. It was the seat of one of the bailiwicks of the Archbishopric and shows that the prelates were integrated into feudal society and that the ecclesiastical power was exerted on seigneuries. The archbishops had to defend their properties against their neighbours, before and after the Albigensian Crusade. Villerouge was the centre of a vast domain, because the Archbishop of Narbonne was the lord of many villages in the region and he collected tithes, taxes or duties there. To collect these revenues and to control his vassals, the archbishop had a baillif and Villerouge was in the centre of the bailiwick. The archbishops of Narbonne tried to fortify this place which is imposing in its robustness. The large tower or keep of the south-eastern corner comprises three superimposed rooms, with very thick walls, in which staircases were arranged, leading to a crenelated terrace. The structure was certainly built in the 12th century, perhaps in the third quarter.

The castle played an important role during the Albigensian Crusade. The last Cathar "bon homme", Guillaume Bélibaste, was burnt alive there on 24 August 1321.

The castle, now in ruins, has been classified as a monument historique since 1976.

== Architecture ==
The fortress dates from the 12th century and was modified in the 14th century.

== See also ==
- List of castles in France
- Cathar castles
- Catharism
