= Château d'Auriac =

Ruined castle in the commune of Auriac, France

Coordinates: 42°56′17″N 2°29′37″E

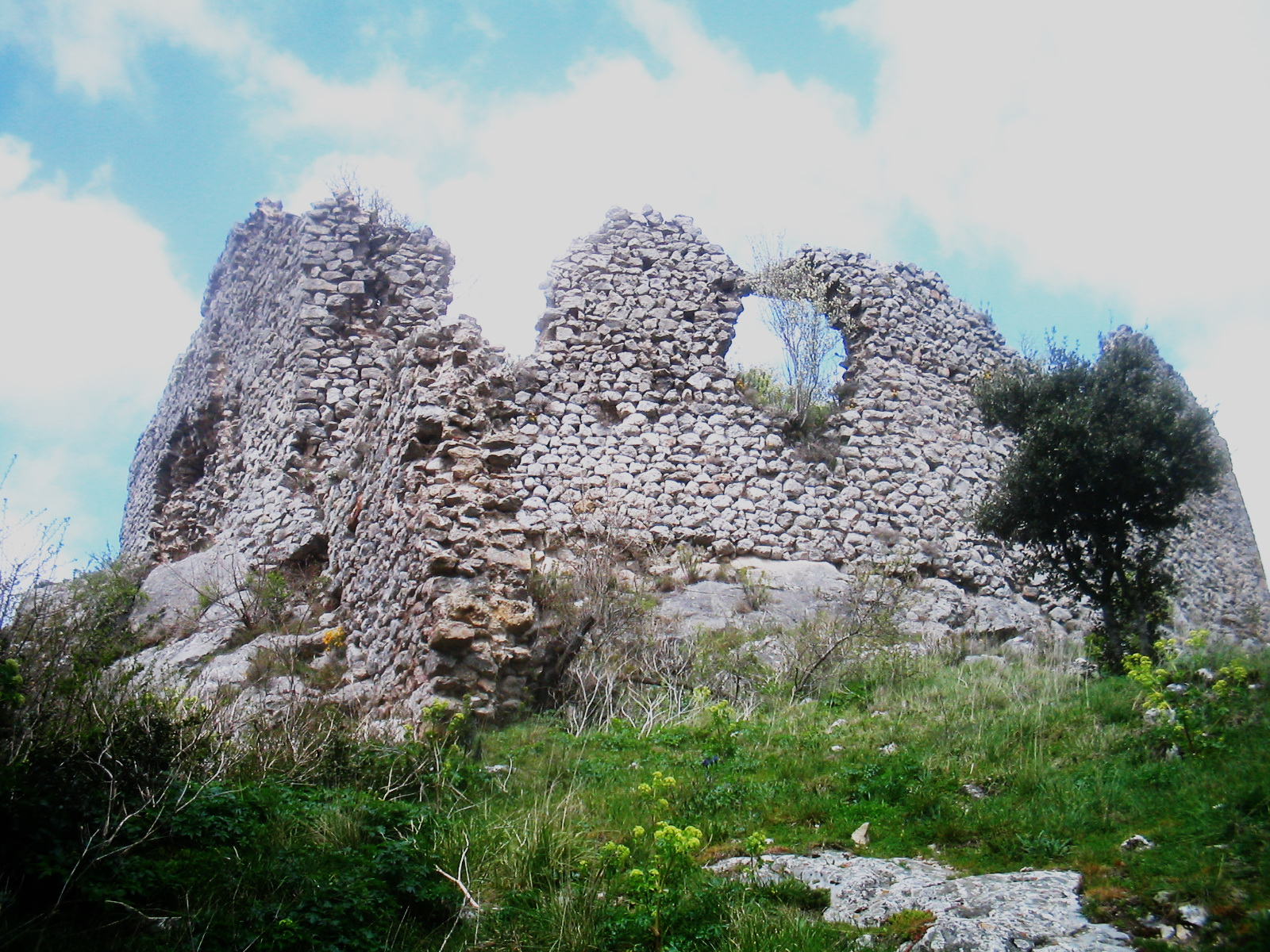

The Château d'Auriac is a ruined castle in the commune of Auriac in the Aude département of France. The castle dates from the 11th and 12th centuries.

The castle stands on a crest overlooking the gorge of the Orbieu river, protected by an octagonal enceinte. Part of the square keep remains.

== History ==
Around 1211, after the Albigensian Crusade, the castle was in the possession of a baron "from the north" (possibly De Lévis). At the start of the 15th century, the castle was altered. In the 16th century, the internal buildings were improved to give more comfort. Large windows and staircase turrets were built. Some arrow slits were modified for firearms. At the end of the 17th century, further architectural alterations were made to improve the residential buildings. Around the 18th century, the castle was abandoned. In 1849, the Château d'Auriac belonged to Monsieur Laffont of Donos. In 1859, he sold the castle to Monsieur Casimir Ducros of Castres.

Visiting the castle is free. It is owned by the commune and the state. It has been listed since 1948 as a monument historique by the French Ministry of Culture.

== See also ==
- List of castles in France
