= Château de Portes =

Castle in Portes, Gard, France

Coordinates: 44°16′5″N 4°1′38″E

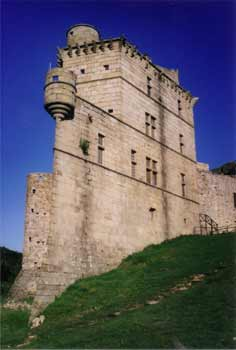
The Château de Portes

The Château de Portes is a castle located in the commune of Portes in the Gard département of France. It overlooks the Regordane, an ancient avenue used by the pilgrims of Saint-Giles and the Croisés on their way towards the Holy Land for a distance of ten miles. The Anduze, Randon and Polignac families paid homage to the abbot of Saint-Pierre-de-Sauve for this castle between the 11th and the 14th centuries. The castle is listed as a monument historique by the French Ministry of Culture.

== History ==
Raymond Guillaume de Budos, the nephew of Pope Clement V, bought the seigniory in 1322, and added at least two additional flanks to the castle in 1384. Thibaud de Budos recovered the castle after deposing his father André, who had joined with the English at the beginning of the Hundred Years' War.

The seigniory became increasingly rich and powerful until Louis XII set it up as a marquisat in favour of Antoine Hercules de Budos, to whom is undoubtedly owed the form of the present castle. His father was a bishop of Agde, one of his sisters a duchess of Montmorency, and another the abbess of "l'Abbaye des Dames" (The Abbey of Dames) in Caen. The Maréchal-de-Camp Antoine-Hercule de Budos was killed in the siege of Privas in 1629. His daughter, Marie-Félice, left the castle as an heirloom to her nephew, Prince de Conti, in 1693, whose descendants sold it to Louis XVI in 1781.

With the French Revolution, the castle was nationalised and sold to six successive owners. In 1841, in the hands of the Vernede family, the monument was restored from its decrepit condition.

In 1929, following the intensive exploitation of the coal mines under the site, the ground broke down ruining the castle and forcing its evacuation. The village was rebuilt about 300 metres further. Circa 1960, the grounds were stabilised and in 1972 an association was formed to recover the castle. It has been classified as a historical monument since 1984.

== Architecture ==
The castle has a singular architectural style among castles in Europe because of its 49 degree spurs in the shape of a ship's bow, which earned the castle its nickname of a vessel in the Cévennes (French: un vaisseau en Cévennes).

== See also ==
- List of castles in France
