= Château de Villandraut =

Ruined castle in Nouvelle-Aquitaine, France

Coordinates: 44°27′35″N 0°22′22″W

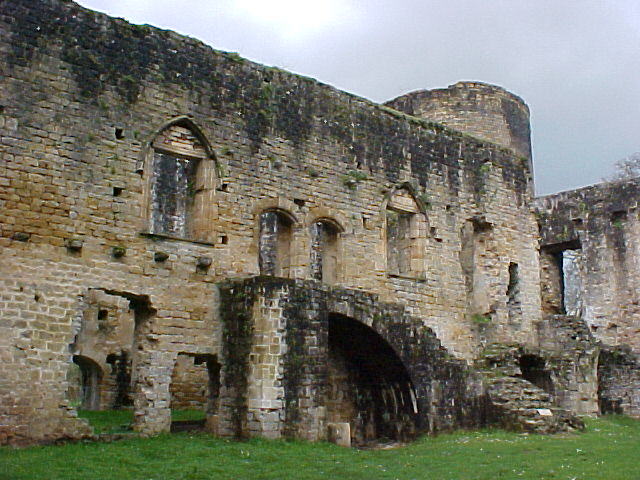
Domestic quarters

The Château de Villandraut is a ruined castle in the commune of Villandraut in the Gironde département of France. It was constructed between 1305 and 1312 by Bertrand de Goth after he was elected to be Pope Clement V.

== History ==
Bertrand de Goth was born in Villandraut and maintained throughout his life a special affection for his region of origin. This sumptuous castle was destined to serve as his residence during his stays in Guyenne (Aquitaine).

The south tower of the castle was destroyed in 1592 as part of the French Wars of Religion, when forces of the Catholic League took refuge inside and Henry IV's army fired on the castle with 1,260 cannons to push them to a surrender.

== Modern ownership and excavation ==
The castle has been classified since 1886 as a monument historique by the French Ministry of Culture. It is owned by Norbert Fradin, a Bordeaux estate developer.

During excavations of the castle in 2010, many things were revealed about its construction including disturbed trenches west of the main bridge in the south area. Excavations in 2015 found stone beneath the ground serving as the base for a staircase.

== See also ==
- Château de Budos, nearby castle also associated with Clement V
- List of castles in France
