= Château de Clérans =

Castle in Nouvelle-Aquitaine, France

Coordinates: 44°51′46″N 0°40′00″E

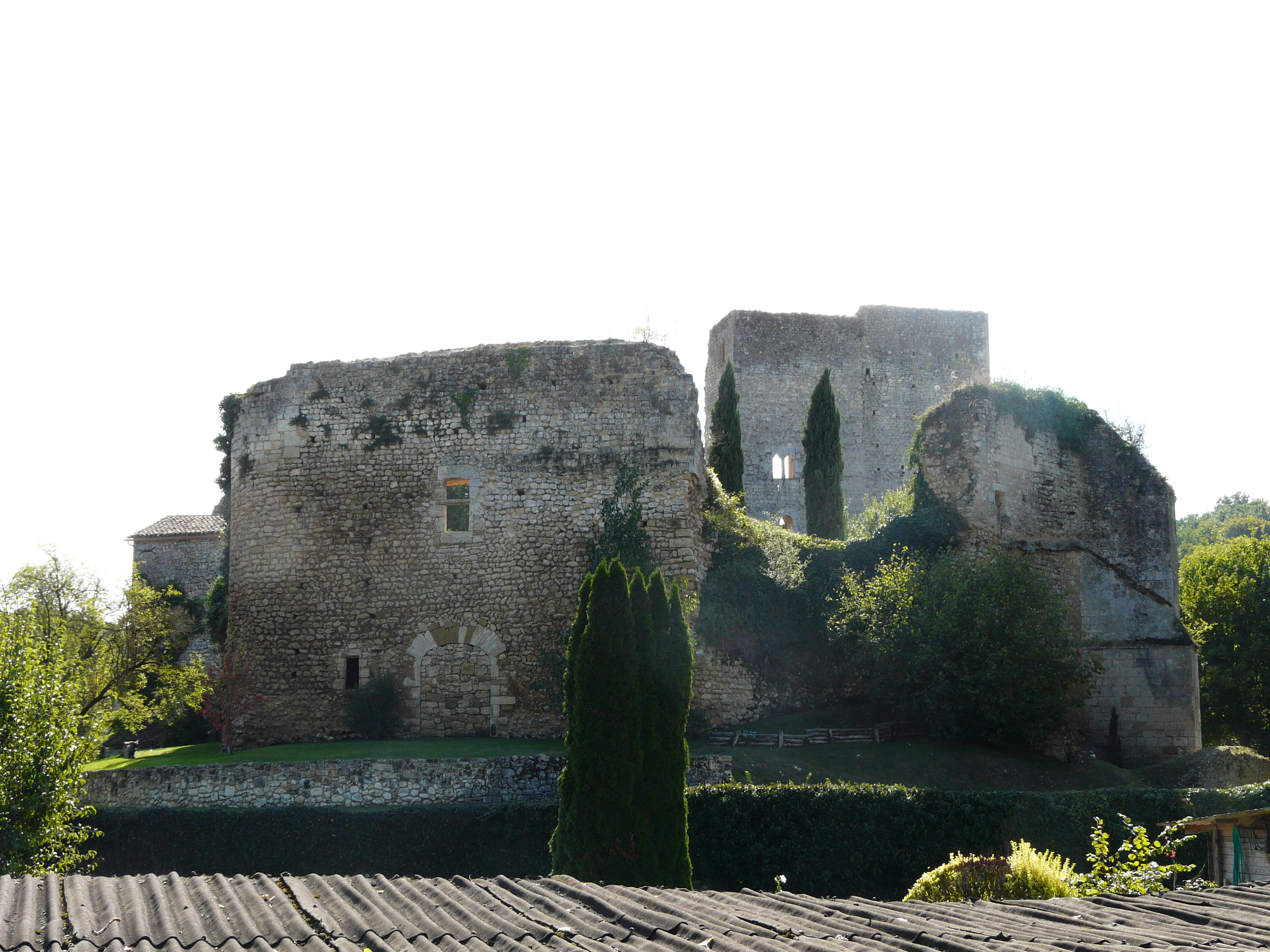

The Château de Clérans is a castle in the commune of Cause-de-Clérans in the Dordogne département of France. It was built in the 12th, 13th and 14th centuries.

== Description ==
The castle is situated in the southeast of the Périgord in a region known as Périgord pourpre, in the south of the Dordogne.

It is private property, open to the public on European Heritage Days.

The castle was listed in 1948 as a monument historique for its keep and for other remains in 2007.

== History ==
An earlier castle on the site was burned by Raymond I of Turenne around 1100. The castle was rebuilt from the 12th century.

During the Hundred Years' War, it changed hands several times between the English and the French, notably in 1378 when it was taken by Bertrand Du Guesclin. The castle became French in 1453.

Abandoned, it was used as a stone quarry in the 19th century until it was bought in 1936.

== Architecture ==
The dwellings, the two towers, the châtelet and the medieval ramparts, the high keep and a split enceinte, are preserved in state of ruins, except for a chapel fitted out as housing.

== Gallery ==
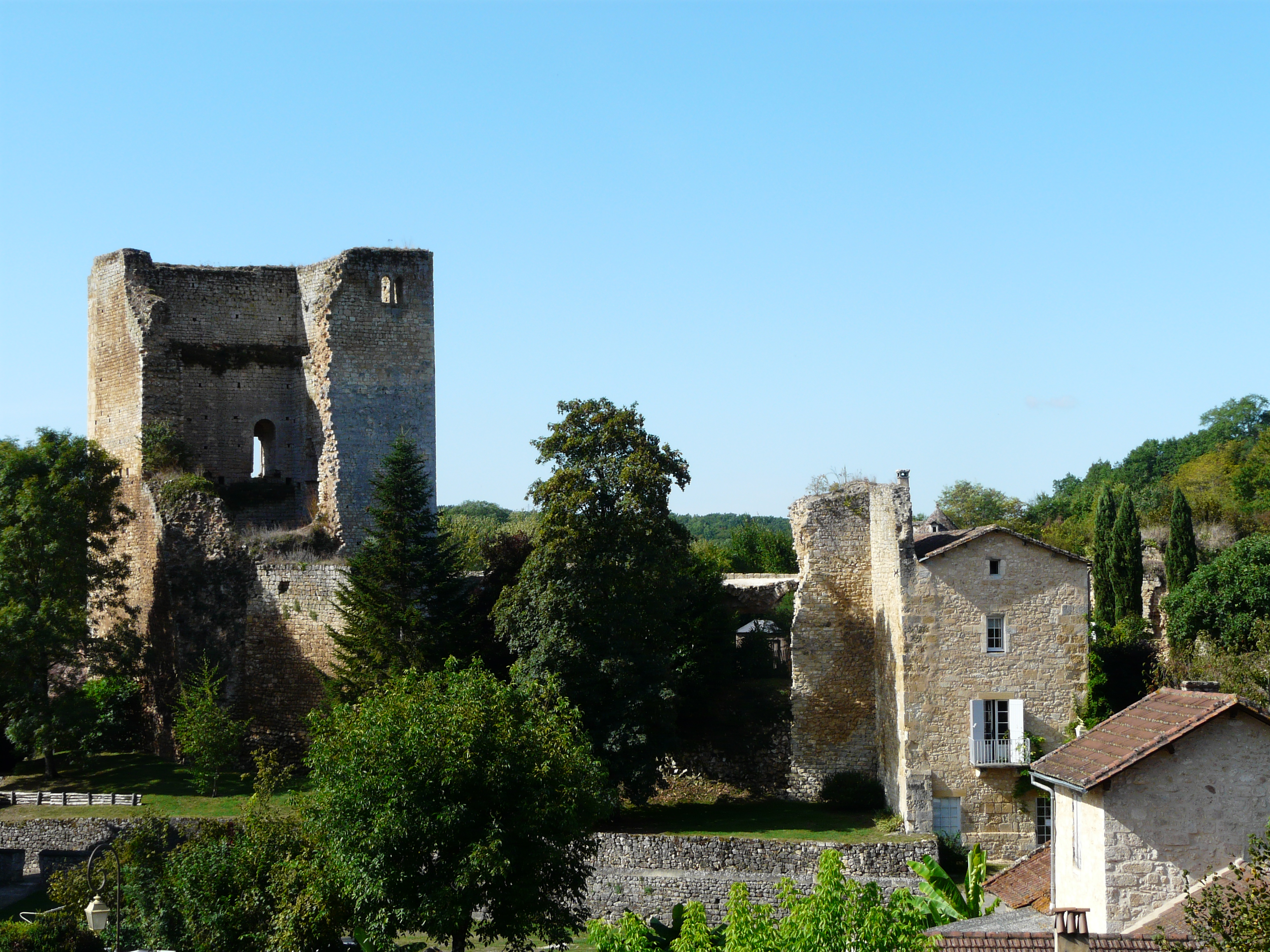
Castle ruins,
northeast side

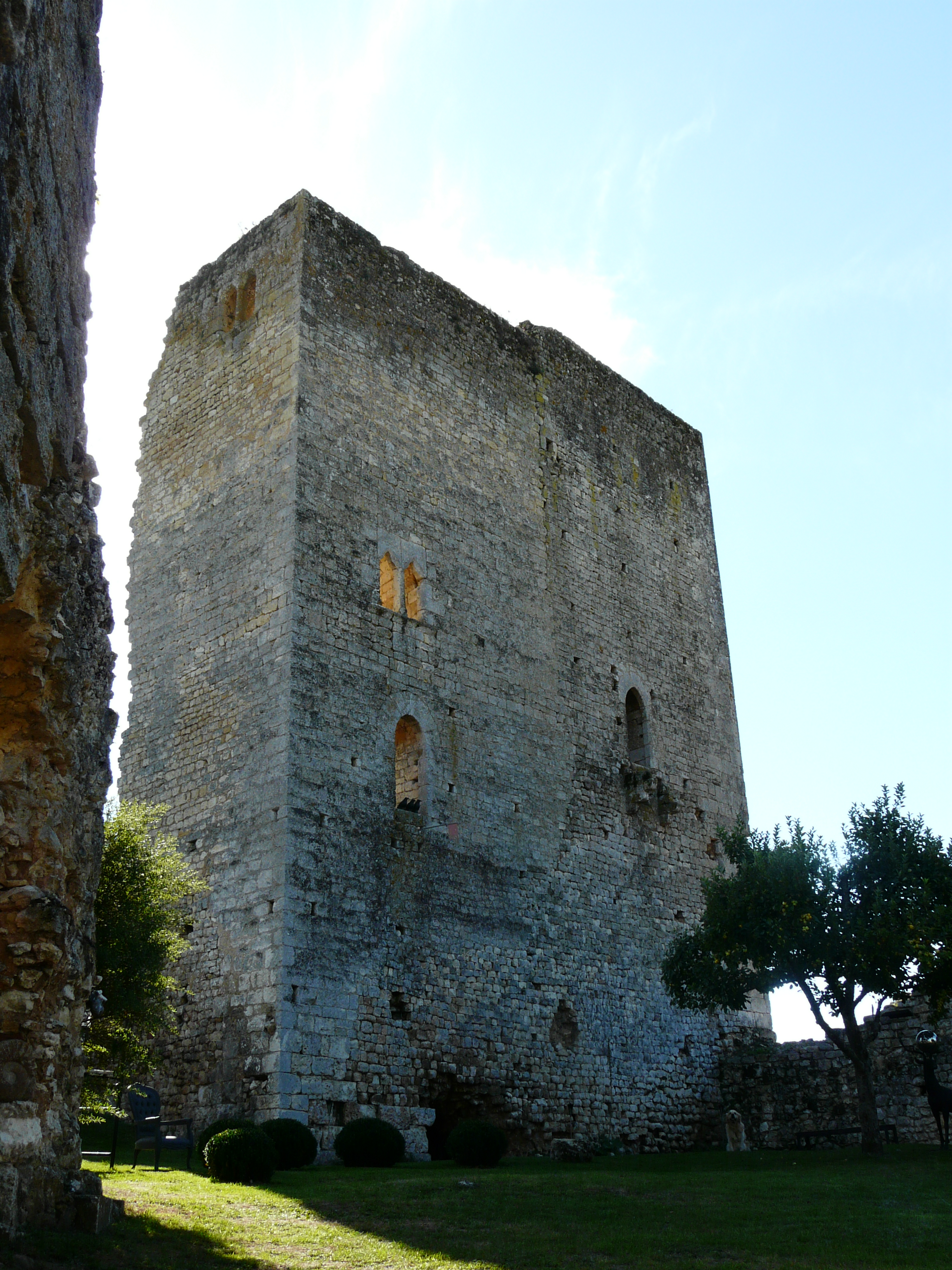
The keep

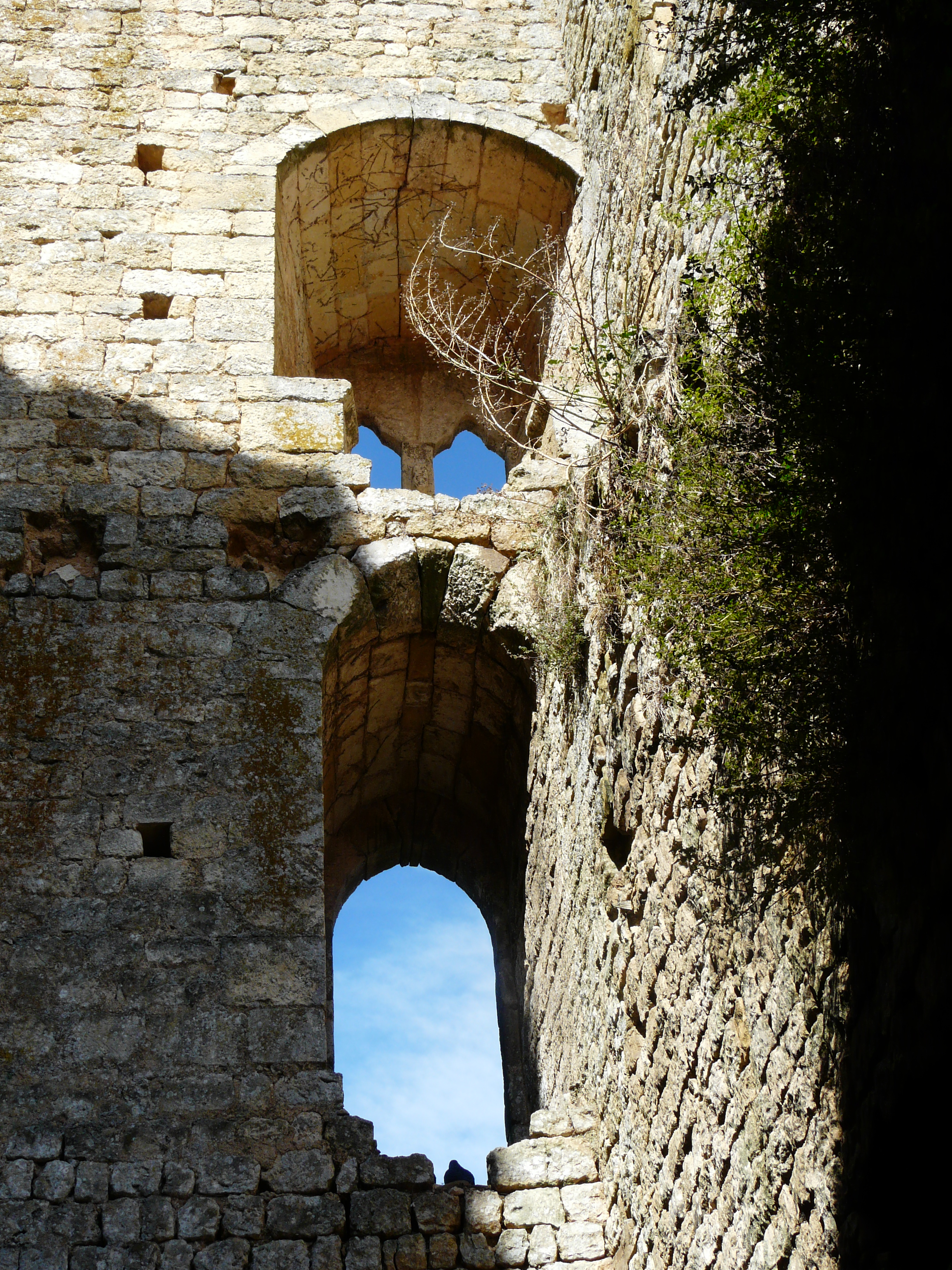
Openings inside
the keep

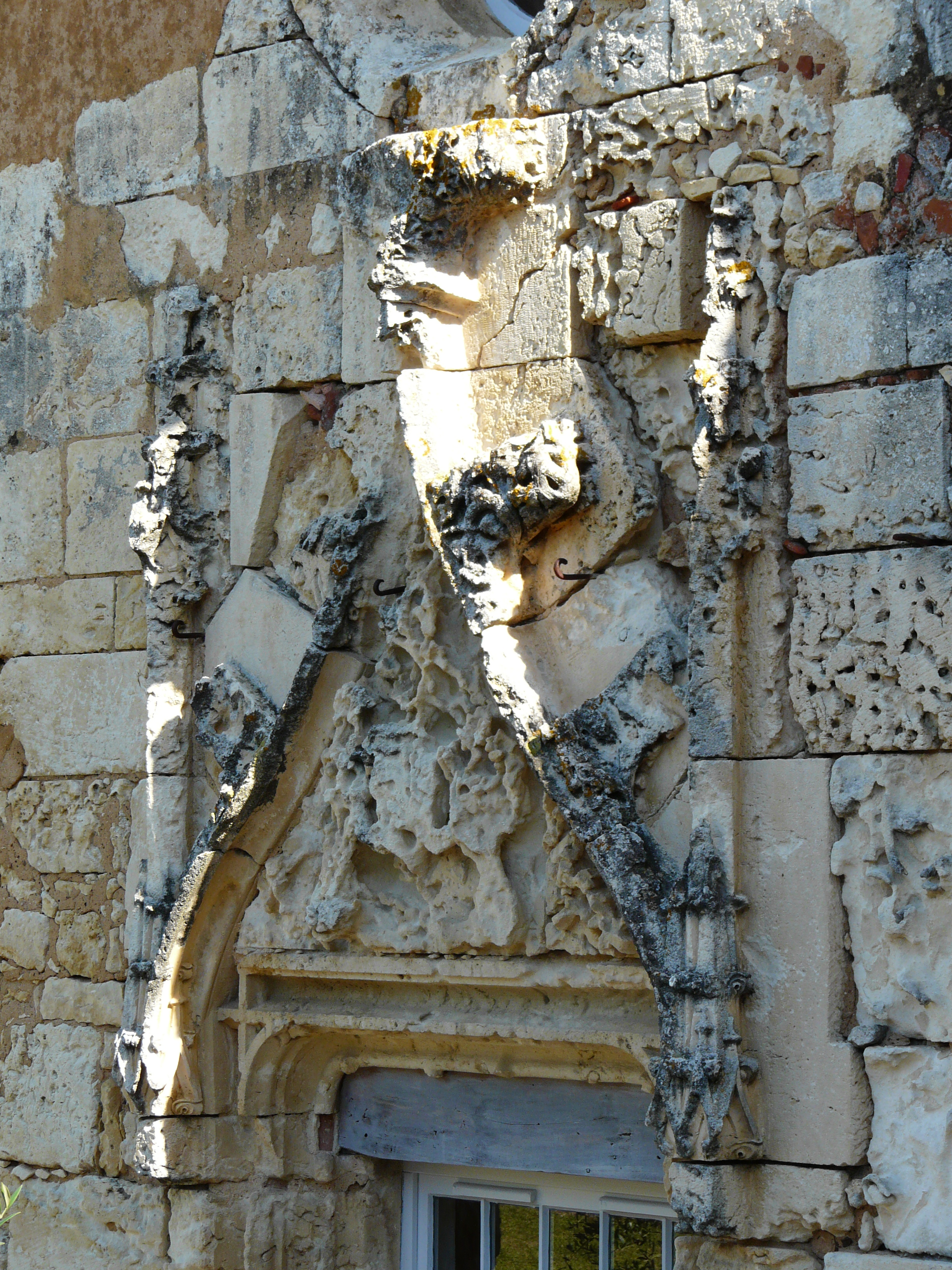
The tympanum of
the former chapel

== See also ==
- List of castles in France
