= Cause-de-Clérans =

- Commune
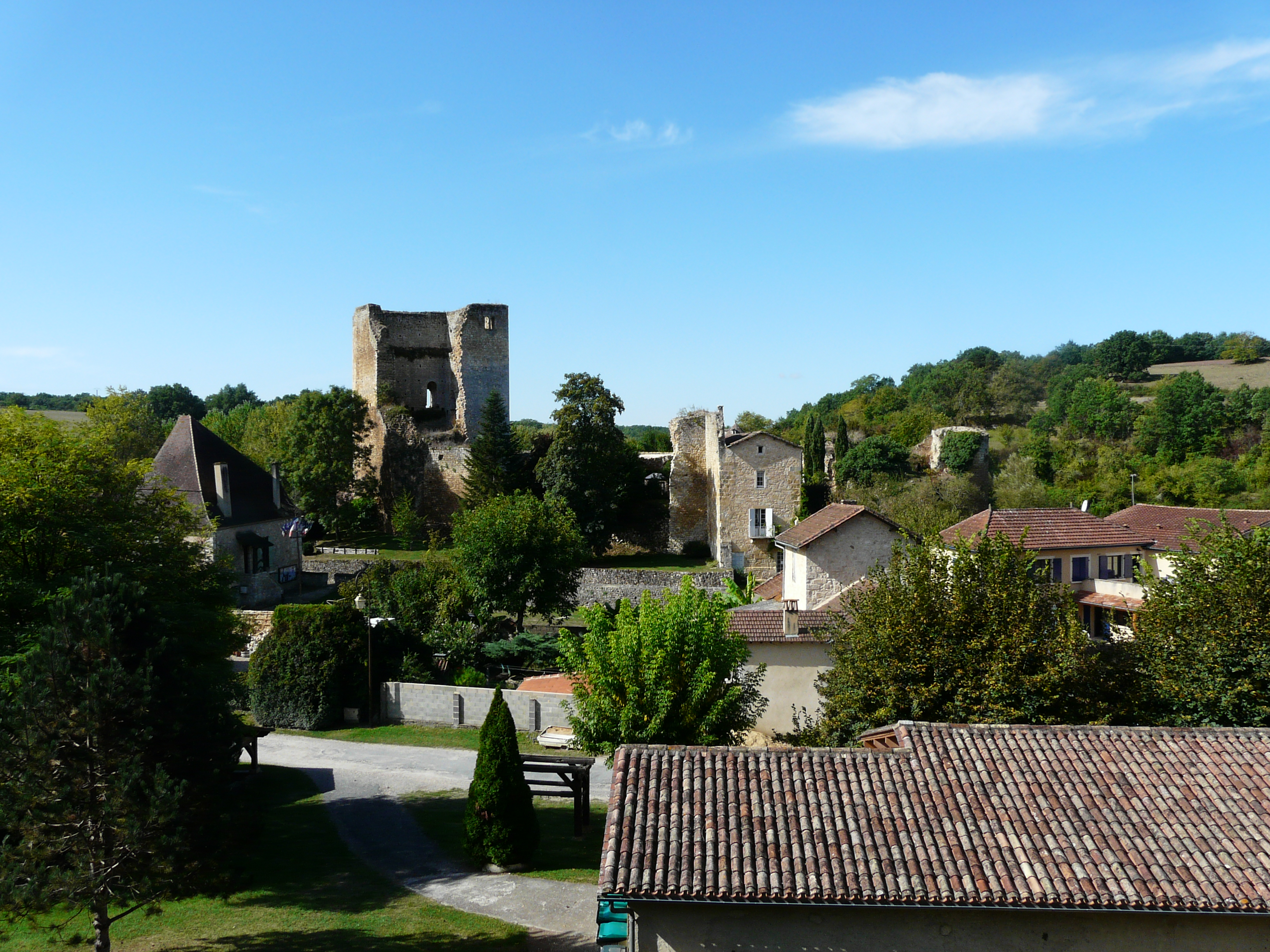
- The village of Clérans

- Coat of arms
- Location of Cause-de-Clérans
- Location within France Location within Nouvelle-Aquitaine
- Coordinates: 44°51′59″N 0°40′24″E
- Country: France
- Region: Nouvelle-Aquitaine
- Department: Dordogne
- Arrondissement: Bergerac
- Canton: Lalinde
- Intercommunality: Communauté de communes des Bastides Dordogne-Périgord

Government
  - Mayor (2020–2026): Bruno Monti
- Area^{1}: 14.35 km^{2} (5.54 sq mi)
- Elevation: 90 m (300 ft)
- Highest elevation: 156 m (512 ft)
- Lowest elevation: 47 m (154 ft)
- Population (2022): 336
  - Density: 23.4/km^{2} (60.6/sq mi)
- Time zone: UTC+01:00 (CET)
  - Summer (DST): UTC+02:00 (CEST)
- INSEE/Postal code: 24088 /24150
- ^{1} French Land Register data, which excludes lakes, ponds, glaciers > 1 km^{2} (0.386 sq mi or 247 acres) and river estuaries.

Cause-de-Clérans (French pronunciation: [koz də kleʁɑ̃]; Occitan: Cause de Clarenç) is a commune in the Dordogne department in Nouvelle-Aquitaine in southwestern France.

== Population ==
Historical population
Year	Pop.	±% p.a.
1968	326	—
1975	277	−2.30%
1982	248	−1.57%
1990	278	+1.44%
1999	310	+1.22%
2007	313	+0.12%
2012	334	+1.31%
2017	345	+0.65%
2023	331	−0.69%
Source: INSEE

== Geography ==
=== General ===
Located in the south of the Dordogne department, within the Bergeracois, the commune forms part of the Bergerac functional area. It is crossed by the Clérans, a small tributary of the Dordogne. The village is bordered by departmental road D36, which runs northeast to southwest. It lies about 6 km west-northwest of Lalinde and 15 km east of Bergerac in a straight line.

=== Neighboring communes ===
Cause-de-Clérans borders six other communes: Saint-Marcel-du-Périgord (north), Pressignac-Vicq (northeast), Baneuil (southeast), Saint-Capraise-de-Lalinde (south), Mouleydier (southwest), and Liorac-sur-Louyre (northwest).

=== Geology and relief ===
Geological map of Cause-de-Clérans.

Cause-de-Clérans lies on the northern edge of the Aquitaine Basin, with strata reflecting marine sedimentation. It occupies a plateau of sandstone and lacustrine limestone from the Tertiary period. Outcropping layers include superficial Quaternary formations and sedimentary rocks from the Cenozoic and Mesozoic. Elevation ranges from 47 m in the southwest to 156 m in the northeast.

=== Landscapes ===
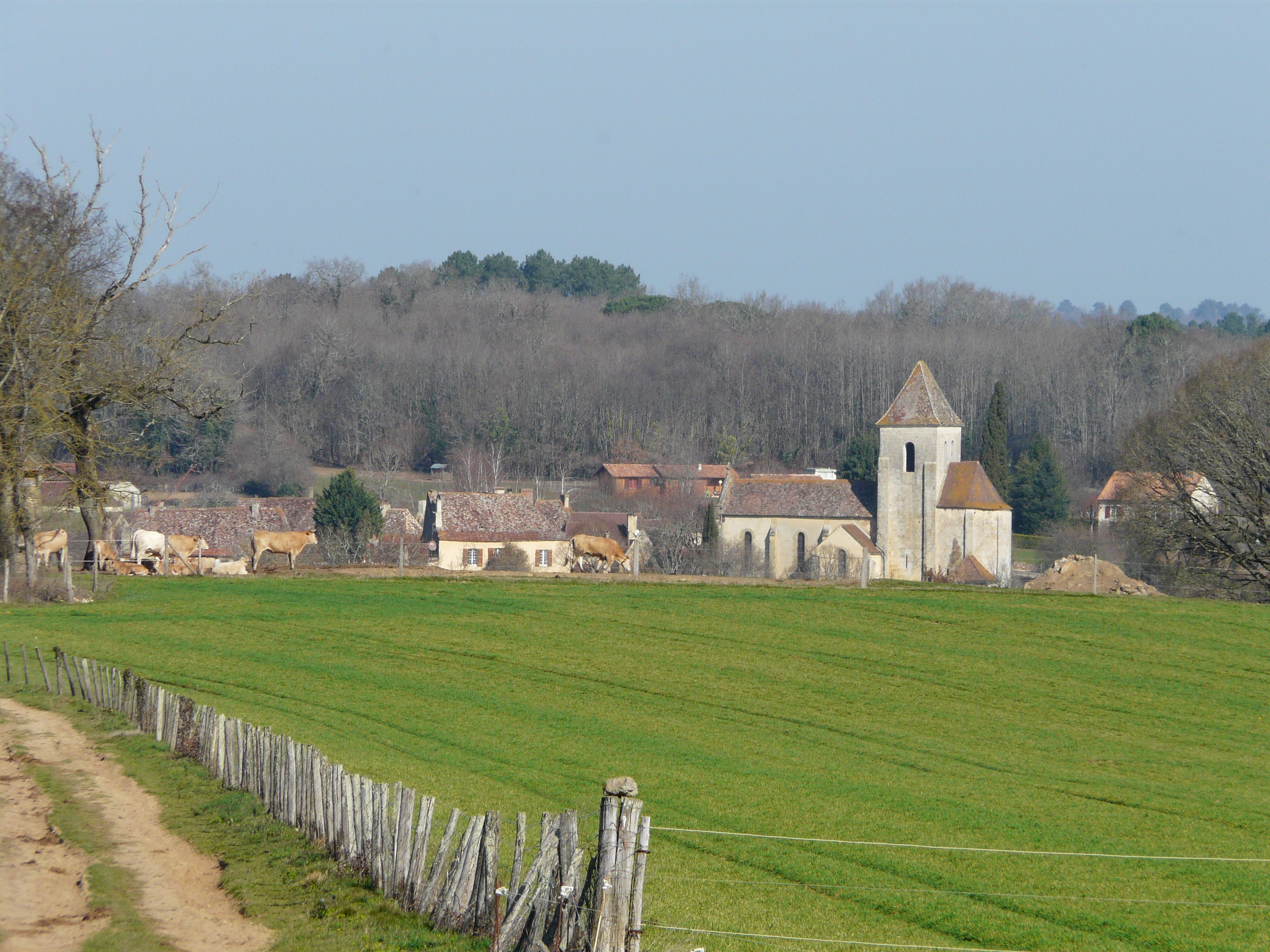
The village of Cause and its church.

Cause-de-Clérans is part of the Central Périgord landscape unit, with a mosaic of forest, meadows, and mixed agriculture.

=== Hydrography ===
The commune lies in the Dordogne basin of the Adour–Garonne hydrographic area. It is drained by the Clérans stream, which crosses east to southwest, and by the Sérouze, which borders the territory to the north for about 3 km.

=== Climate ===
Cause-de-Clérans has an altered oceanic climate. At the nearby Bergerac station (1991–2020 normals), the average annual temperature was 13.2 °C and mean annual precipitation 793 mm.

== Urbanism ==
=== Typology ===
As of 1 January 2024, the commune is classified by INSEE as rural with very dispersed housing and forms part of the Bergerac functional area (73 communes).

=== Land use ===
In 2018, CORINE Land Cover reported land use as 56.1% forest, 25.5% meadows, 15.7% heterogeneous agriculture, and 2.8% arable land.

== Sights ==
- The Église Saint-Pierre-ès-Liens, a Romanesque church dating from the 12th century, listed as a monument historique.
- The ruins of the Château de Clérans (12th–15th centuries), also listed as a monument historique.
- The Château de Cause, a manor house recognized as a monument historique.

== Gallery ==
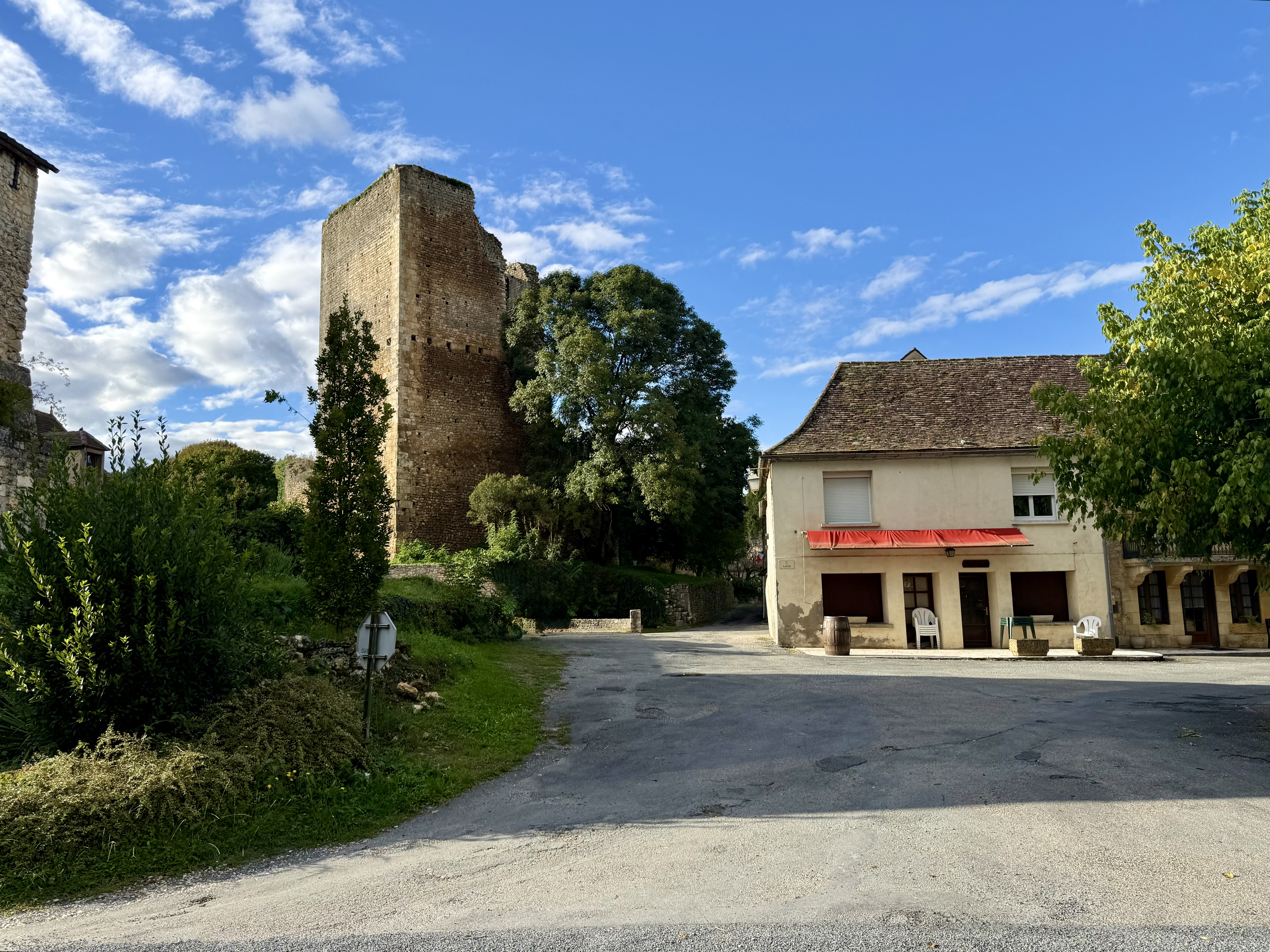
Central square of the hamlet of Clérans with the donjon of the Château de Clérans on the left

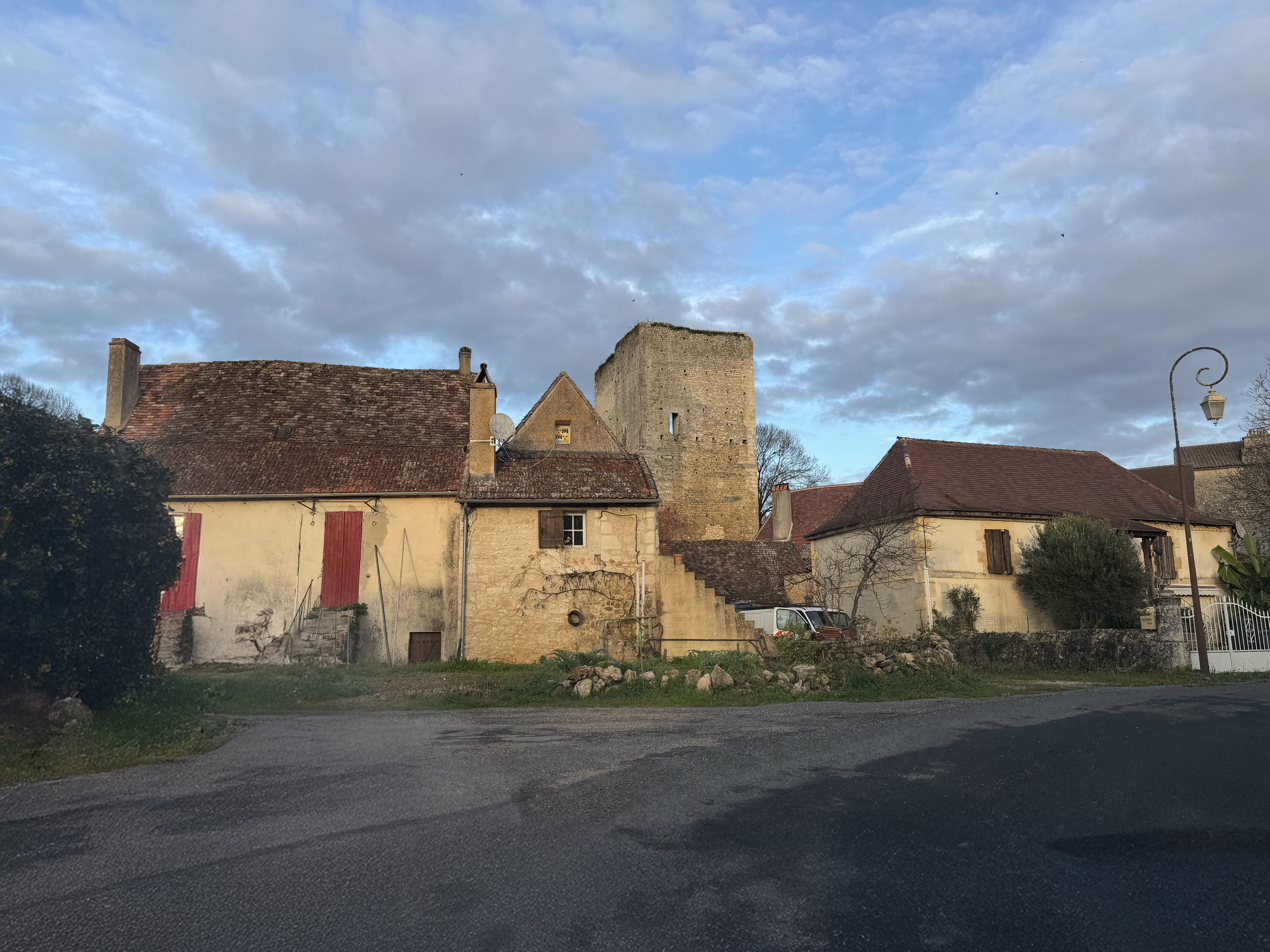
Stone houses and gardens below the donjon of the Château de Clérans

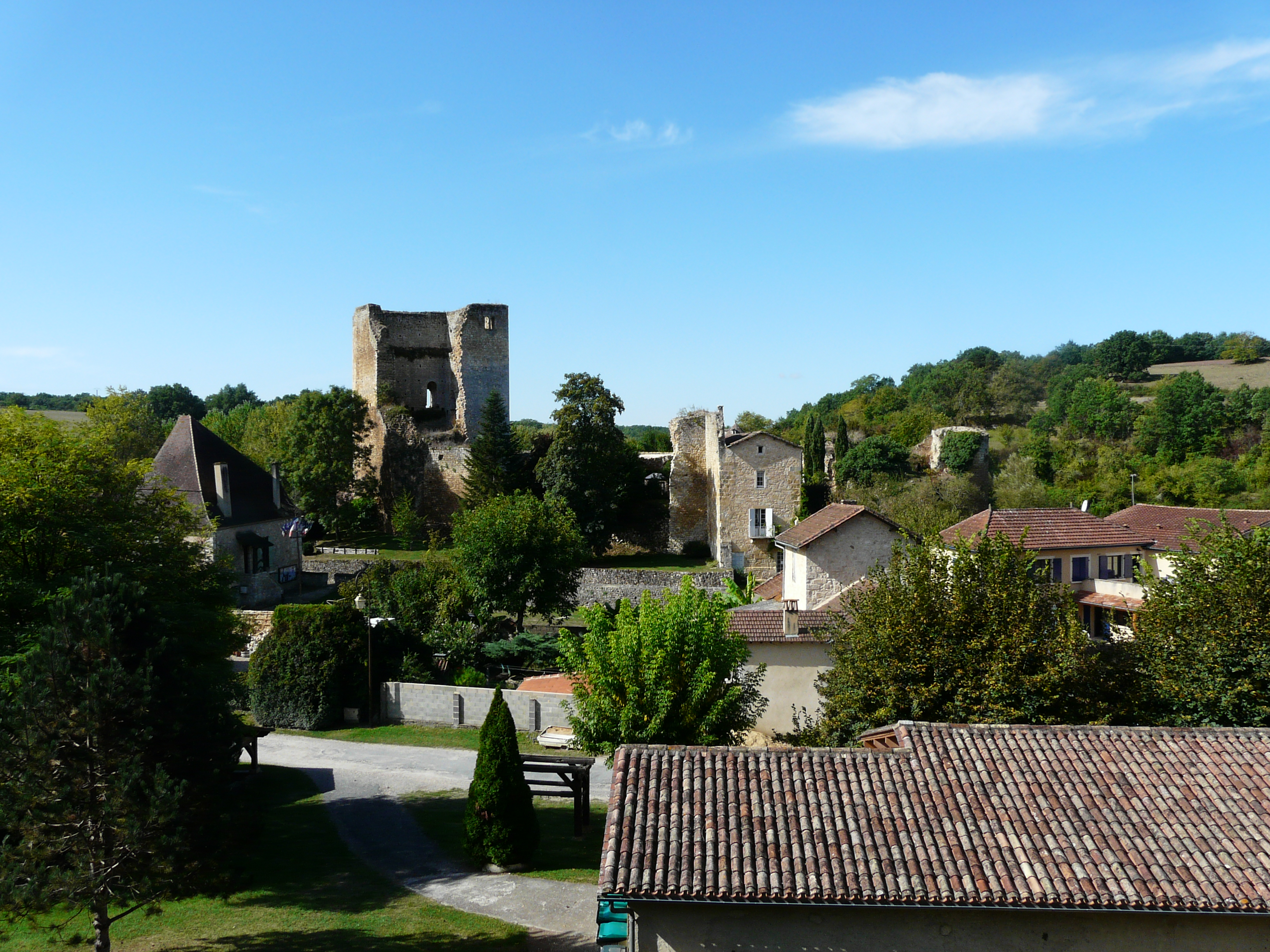
Village view

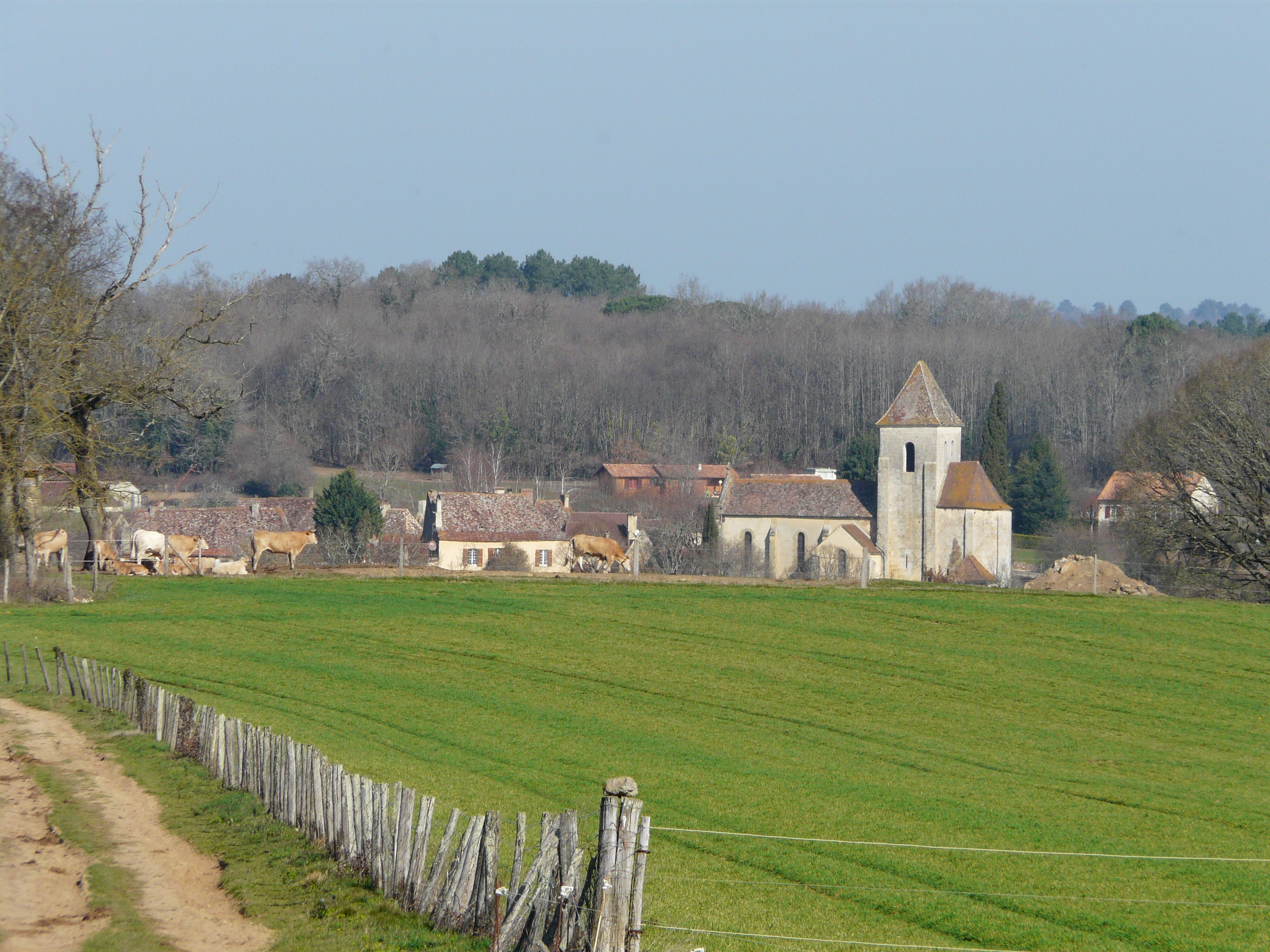
The village of Cause and its church

Geological map of the commune

== See also ==
- Communes of the Dordogne department
