= Château de Baneuil =

Château in Dordogne, Nouvelle-Aquitaine, France

Coordinates: 44°51′09″N 0°41′24″E

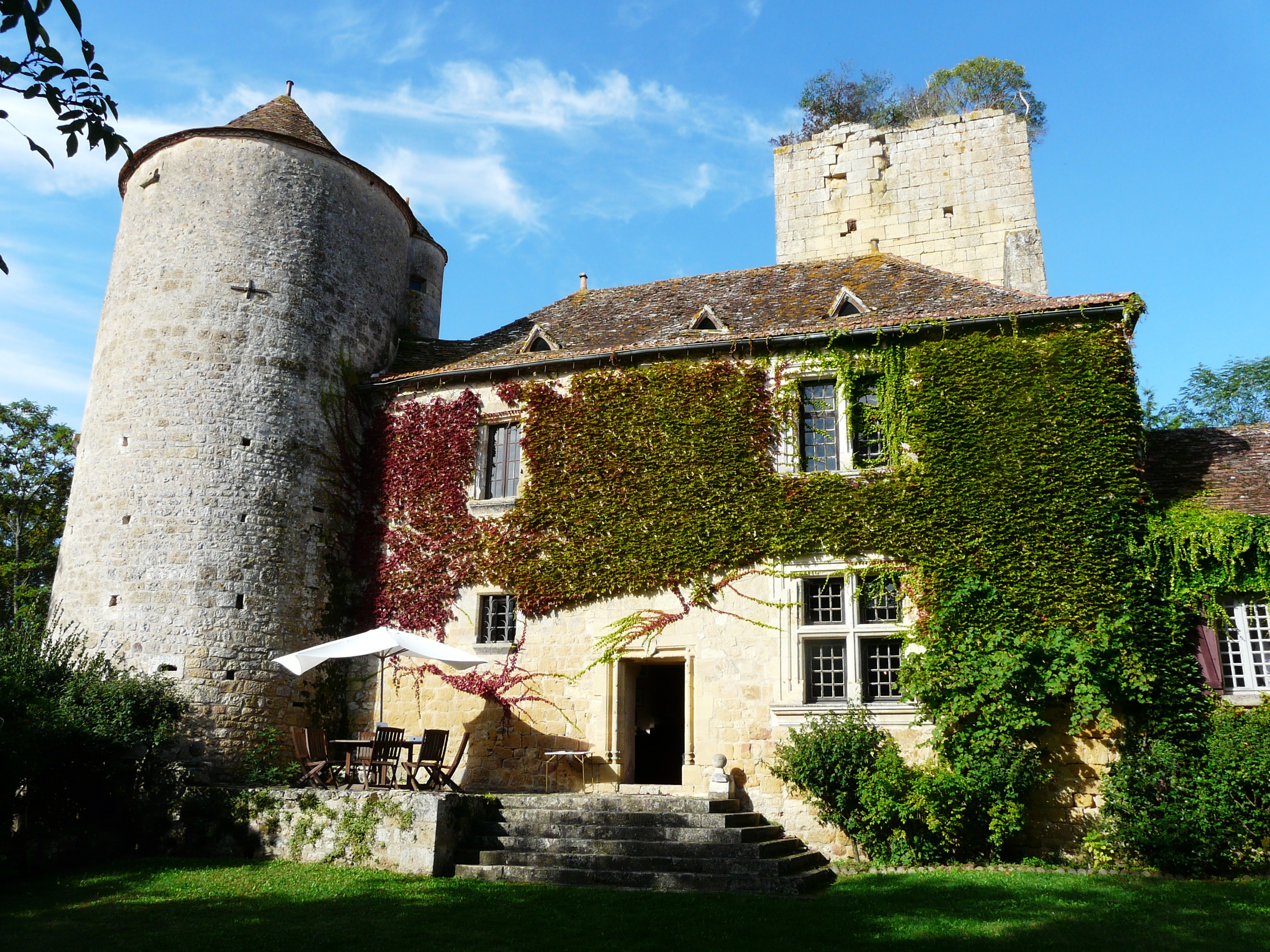

The Château de Baneuil is a castle located in the town of Baneuil, dominating the valley of the Dordogne, in the departement of Dordogne, in the region of Nouvelle-Aquitaine, in France. It was built during the 11th century and widened or modified several times.

It is a private property, open to the visitors during june-july. It is listed as a historical monument since October 18, 1946.

Constructed during the 11th century on the location of a feudal motte, the donjon, simple watchtower, surveyed the valley of the Dordogne and of the Couze. A guard's room, and later during the 14th century a dwelling and a round tower with a bartizan were added.

The castle was besieged several times during the Hundred Years' War.
