= Baneuil =

- Commune
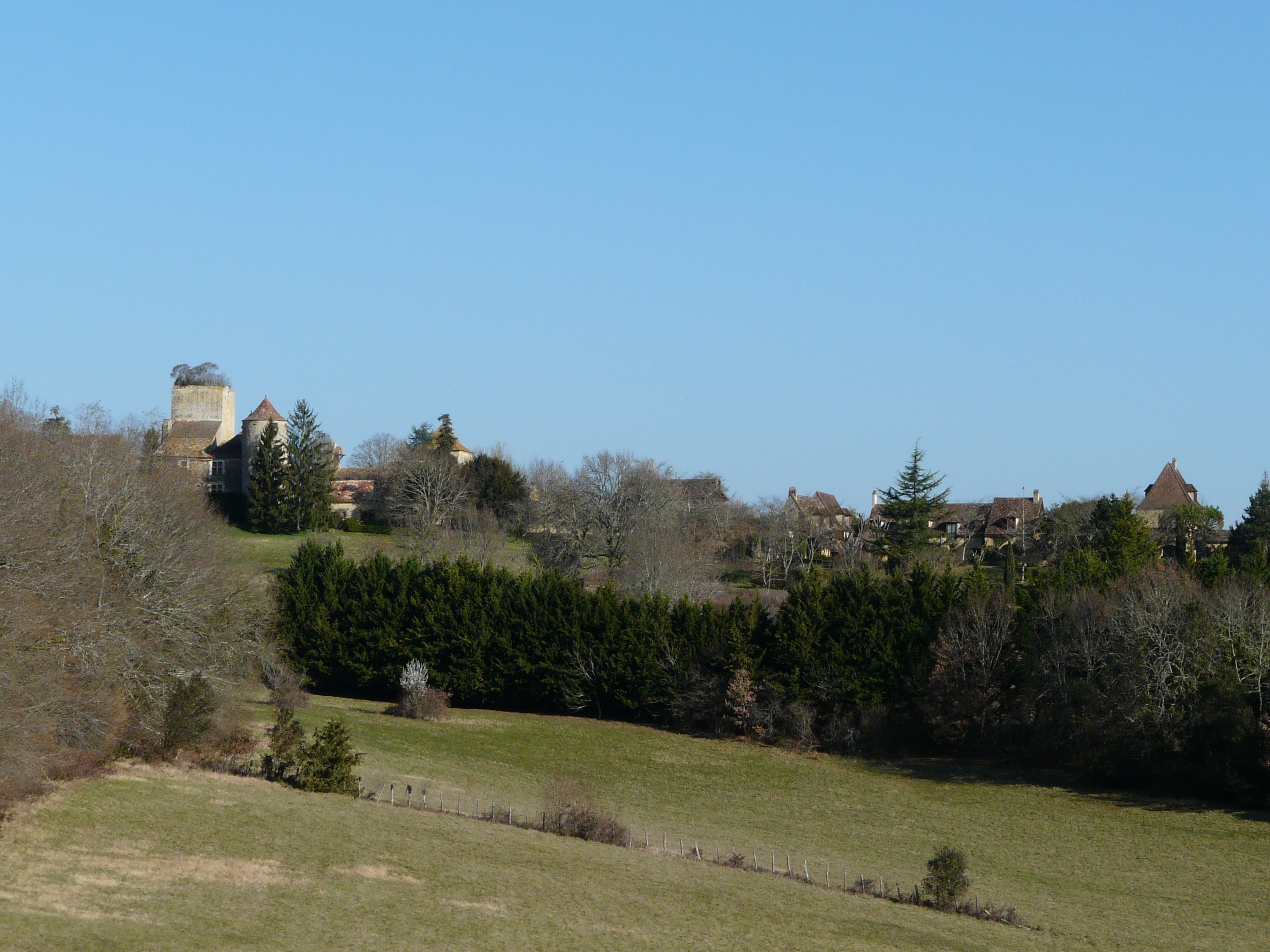
- A general view of Baneuil

- Coat of arms
- Location of Baneuil
- Location within France Location within Nouvelle-Aquitaine
- Coordinates: 44°51′14″N 0°41′25″E
- Country: France
- Region: Nouvelle-Aquitaine
- Department: Dordogne
- Arrondissement: Bergerac
- Canton: Lalinde

Government
  - Mayor (2020–2026): Thierry Joel Deguilhem
- Area^{1}: 8.89 km^{2} (3.43 sq mi)
- Elevation: 140 m (460 ft)
- Highest elevation: 141 m (463 ft)
- Lowest elevation: 27 m (89 ft)
- Population (2023): 321
  - Density: 36.1/km^{2} (93.5/sq mi)
- Time zone: UTC+01:00 (CET)
  - Summer (DST): UTC+02:00 (CEST)
- INSEE/Postal code: 24023 /24150
- ^{1} French Land Register data, which excludes lakes, ponds, glaciers > 1 km^{2} (0.386 sq mi or 247 acres) and river estuaries.

Baneuil (French pronunciation: [banœj]; Occitan: Banuèlh) is a commune in the Dordogne department in southwestern France.

== Population ==
Historical population
Year	Pop.	±% p.a.
1968	260	—
1975	259	−0.06%
1982	262	+0.16%
1990	299	+1.66%
1999	302	+0.11%
2007	357	+2.11%
2012	351	−0.34%
2017	347	−0.23%
2023	321	−1.29%
Source: INSEE

== See also ==
- Communes of the Dordogne department
- Château de Baneuil
