= Château de Posanges =

Castle in France

Coordinates: 47°25′06″N 4°31′34″E

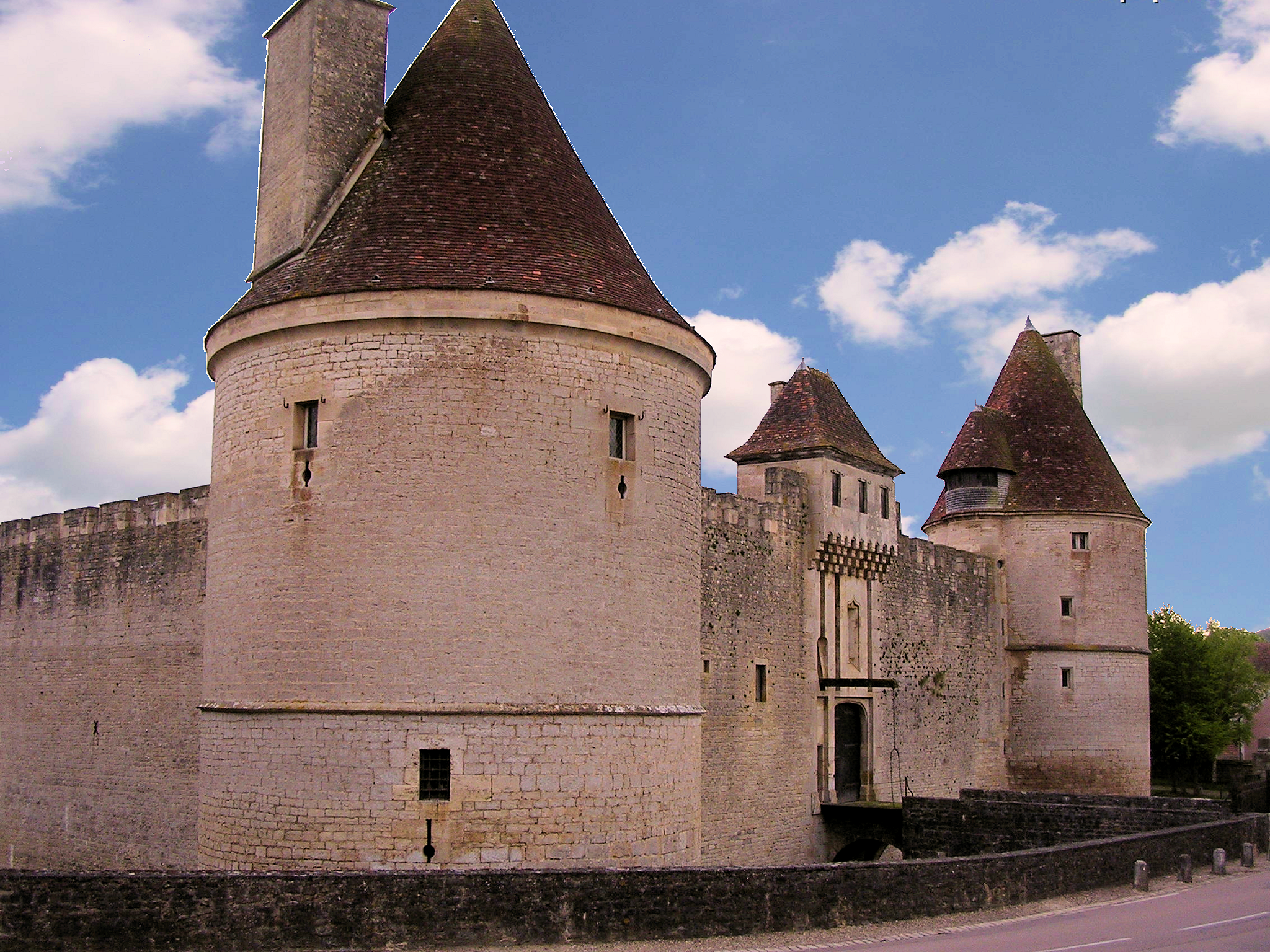
Château de Posanges

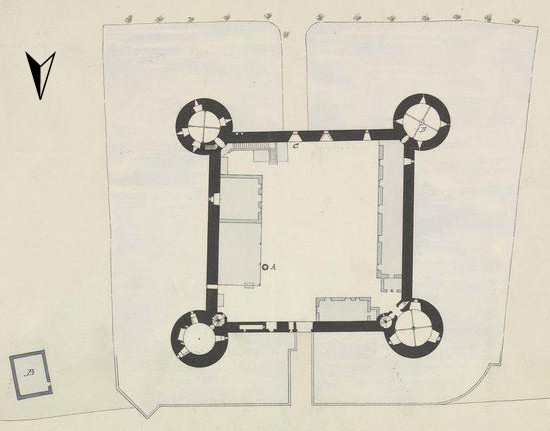
Plan

The Château de Posanges is a castle in the commune of Posanges in the Côte d'Or département of France.

== History ==
Guillaume du Bois, a Berrichon lord in the service of John the Fearless, Duke of Burgundy, and his successor, Philip the Good, acquired the lordship of Posanges in 1437. He built the castle there on the site of an older one between 1440 and 1445 before his death in 1454. His tomb is in the church in Posanges.

The little building had a rather calm life. From 1964 to 1974, it was transformed to accommodate a fabric factory. Since 1974, it has been restored.

It has been classified as a monument historique since 27 December 1913.

== Pigeonnier de Posanges ==
Adjoining the castle, the dovecote was listed as a monument historique on 5 October 1965.

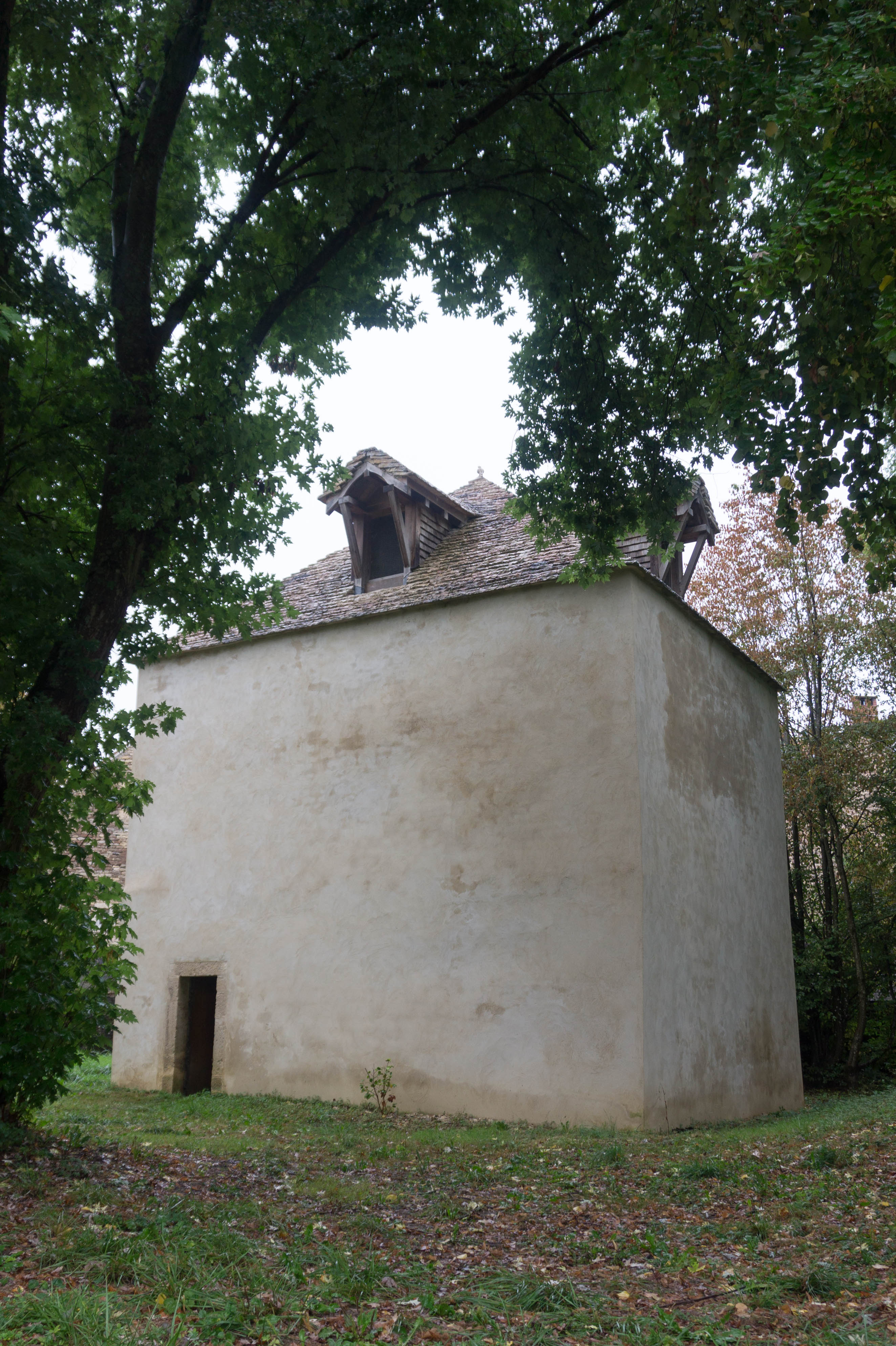
Dovecote exterior

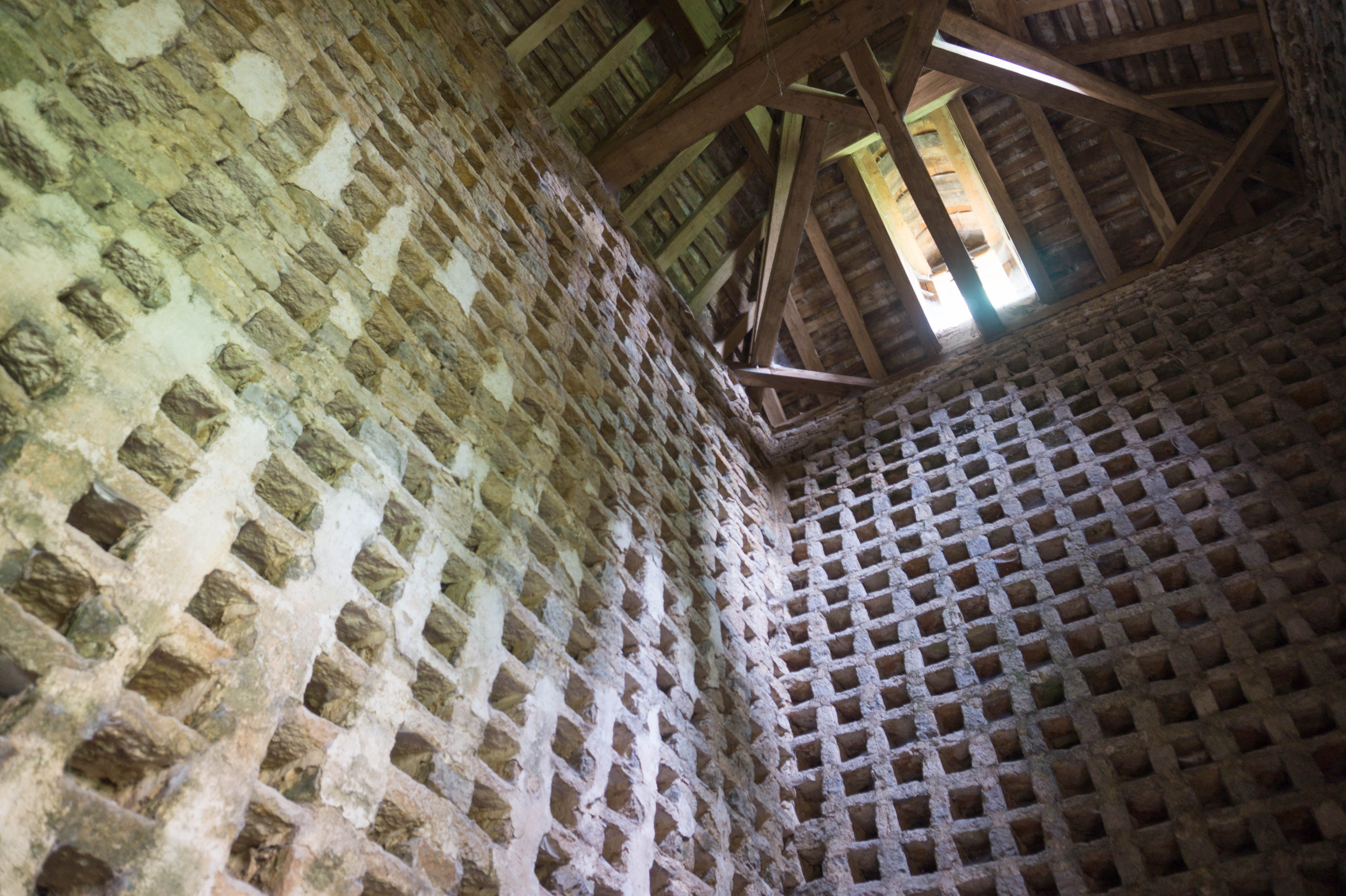
Dovecote interior

== Bibliography ==
- J.-B. de Vaivre, "Le château de Posanges", Congrès archéologique de France, 1986, p. 211–234
