= Posanges =

- Commune
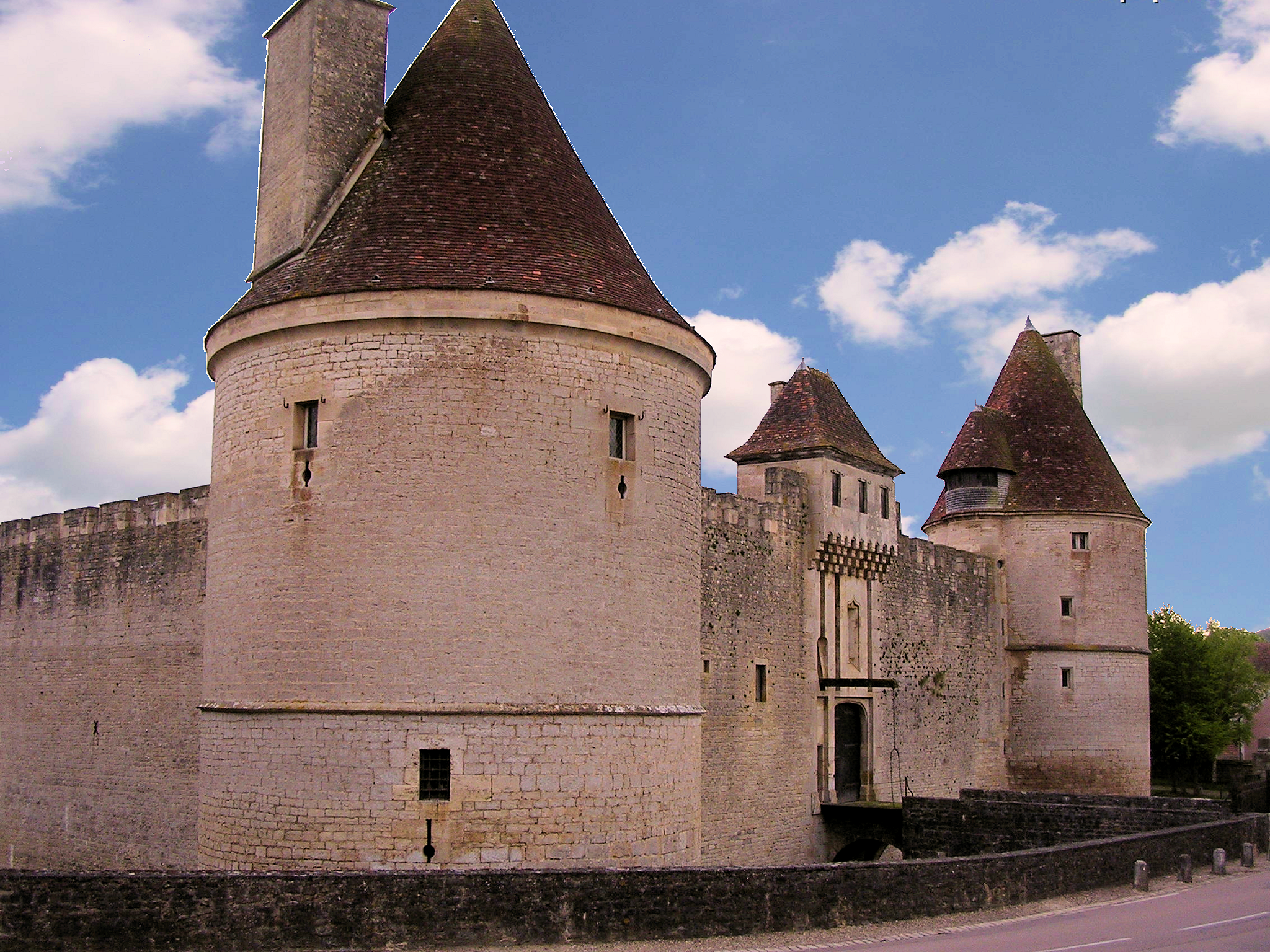
- Château de Posanges

- Coat of arms
- Location of Posanges
- Location within France Location within Bourgogne-Franche-Comté
- Coordinates: 47°25′10″N 4°31′36″E
- Country: France
- Region: Bourgogne-Franche-Comté
- Department: Côte-d'Or
- Arrondissement: Montbard
- Canton: Semur-en-Auxois

Government
  - Mayor (2020–2026): Daniel Bruley
- Area^{1}: 5.8 km^{2} (2.2 sq mi)
- Elevation: 309 m (1,014 ft)
- Highest elevation: 496 m (1,627 ft)
- Lowest elevation: 290 m (950 ft)
- Population (2023): 51
  - Density: 8.8/km^{2} (23/sq mi)
- Time zone: UTC+01:00 (CET)
  - Summer (DST): UTC+02:00 (CEST)
- INSEE/Postal code: 21498 /21350
- ^{1} French Land Register data, which excludes lakes, ponds, glaciers > 1 km^{2} (0.386 sq mi or 247 acres) and river estuaries.

Posanges (French pronunciation: [pozɑ̃ʒ]) is a commune in the Côte-d'Or department in eastern France.

== Population ==
Historical population
Year	Pop.	±% p.a.
1968	78	—
1975	68	−1.94%
1982	49	−4.57%
1990	54	+1.22%
1999	45	−2.01%
2007	60	+3.66%
2012	66	+1.92%
2017	58	−2.55%
2023	51	−2.12%
Source: INSEE

== Sights and monuments ==
- The Château de Posanges is a 15th-century castle. It has been classified since 1913 as a monument historique by the French Ministry of Culture.

== See also ==
- Communes of the Côte-d'Or department
