= Château de Commarin =

Castle in Burgundy, France

Coordinates: 47°15′19″N 4°38′54″E

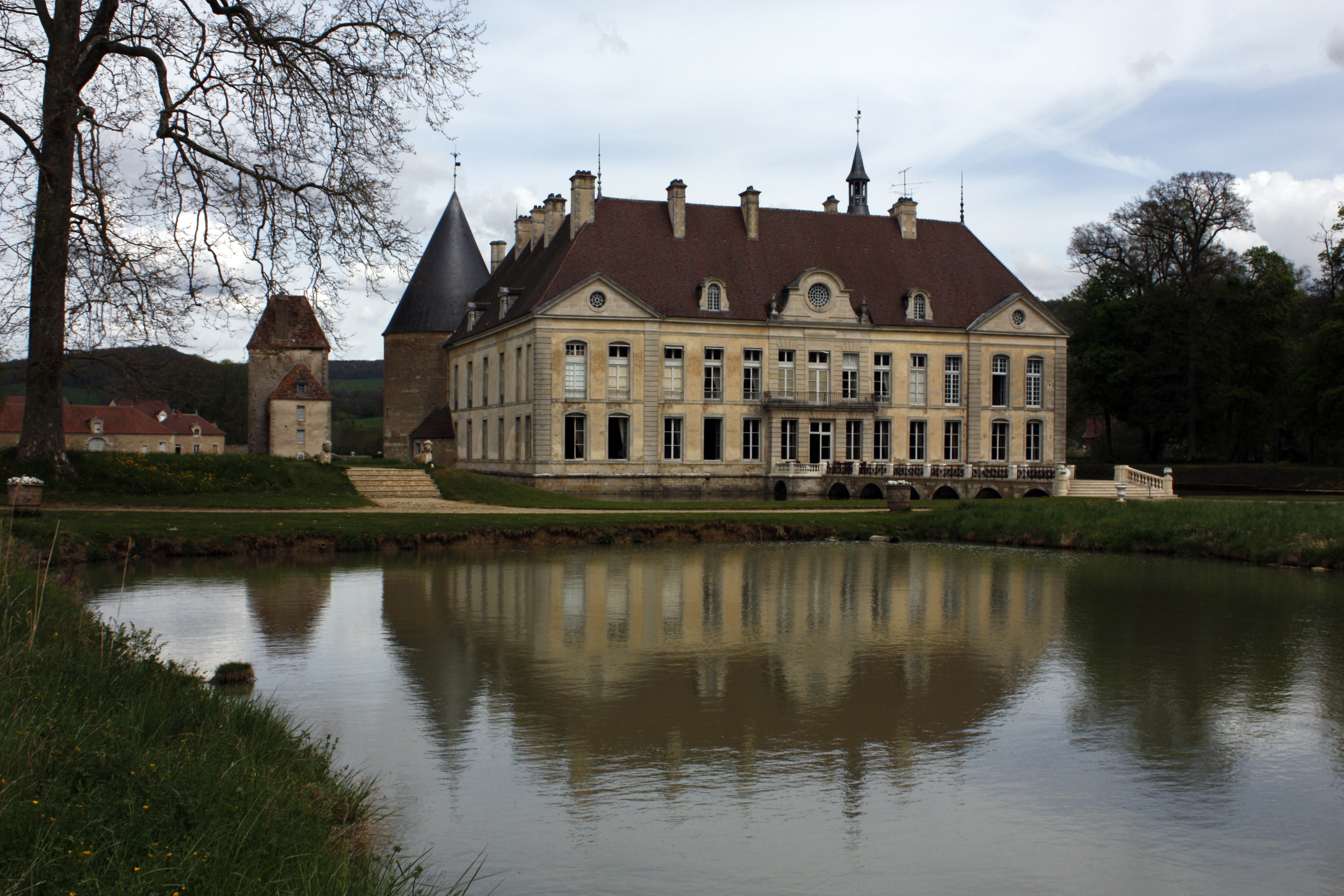
The Château de Commarin

The Château de Commarin in the commune of Commarin in the Côte-d'Or département, Burgundy, France, has passed through 26 generations in the same family; never sold, though it has often passed through heiresses, Commarin today is a seat of the comte de Vogüé. It has been classed a Monument Historique since 1949.

Though the site probably has its origins in a Gallo-Roman villa, Commarin is first mentioned, as a maison forte, in a document of 1214. Its seigneurs were a cadet branch of the seigneurs of Sombernon, from the lineage of the first Dukes of Burgundy. In 1346 Jean and his son Jacques de Cortiamble, chamberlain to Philip the Bold, duke of Burgundy, rebuilt Commarin as a fortified seat; the size and disposition of this moated stronghold established the placement and size of the future rebuildings. The two cylindrical towers with conical roofs date from this rebuilding, and the vaulted chapel. Commarin passed to Agnès de Cortiamble, the elder daughter of Jacques, who brought it as part of her dowry to Jean de Dinteville, seigneur des Chenets.

In the 16th century, Commarin underwent radical transformations to render it a modern habitation. The chapel in the east wing was redecorated with sculptures and a terra cotta tomb. A series of heraldic tapestries woven ca 1515–22, in which family armorials of the Dinteville-Pontailler alternate with alchemical symbols remain in the house. A triptych was executed in 1526, with portraits of Girard de Vienne and his lady.

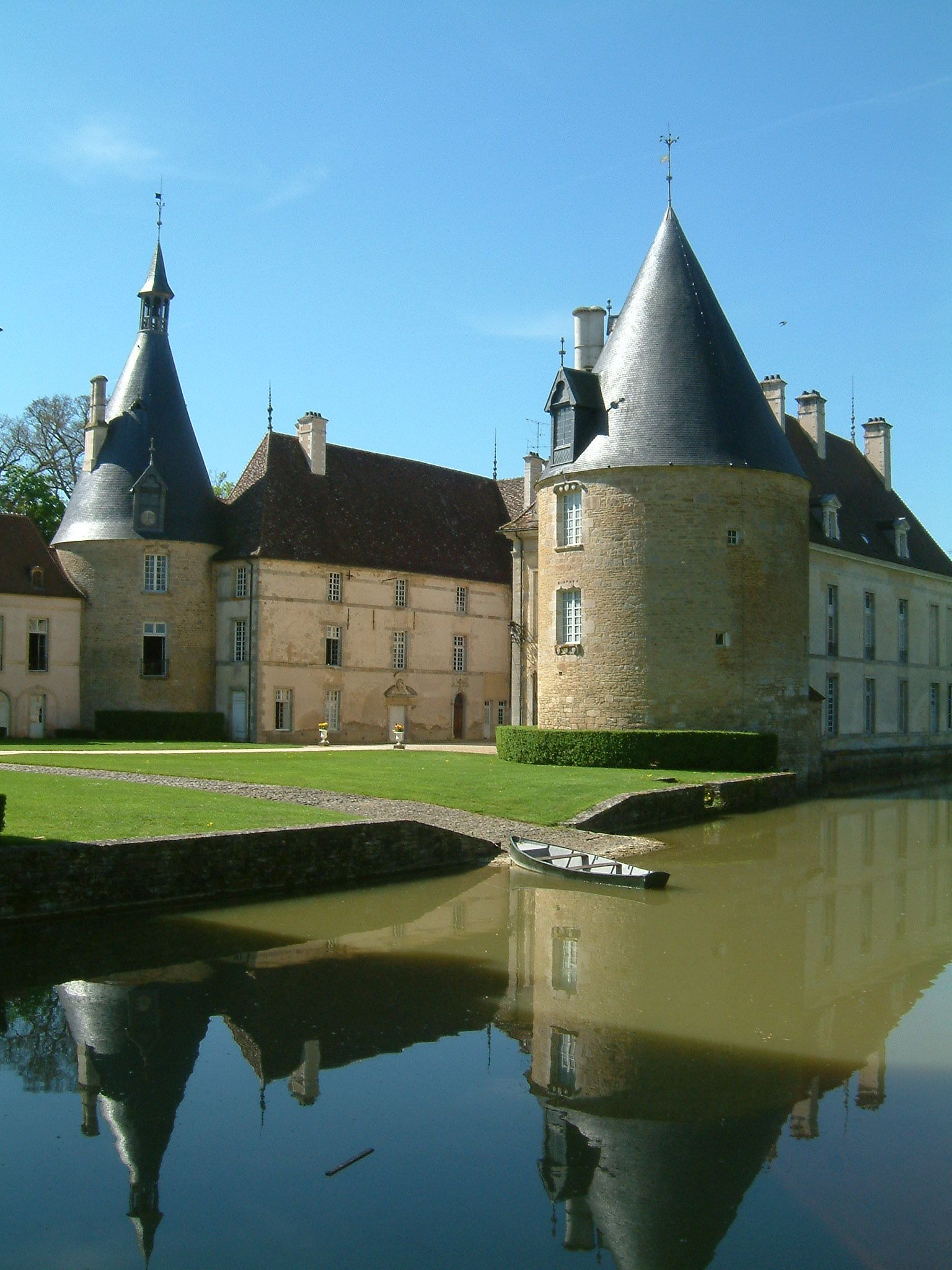
The château from the northeast

In the 17th and 18th centuries, Commarin was largely reconstructed within its ancient walls surrounded by its moat traversed by a bridge of six arches. At the beginning of the 17th century, Charles de Vienne rebuilt the east wing and then demolished the north wing; the resulting U-shaped house encloses a north-facing cour d'honneur. He constructed a handsome stable wing, replaced the former jeu de paume in the outer court (the basse-cour) ending with two pavilions (1622–23). Following the collapse of a corner tower, the southern corps de logis and western ranges of the enclosed medieval court were rebuilt and given the present classicizing façades, to designs by the Dijonnais Philippe Pâris (1702–13). Its furnishing in the early 18th century by Marie-Judith de Vienne, marquise de Damas d’Antigny, the grandmother of Talleyrand — whose mother spent her childhood at Commarin — rendered it substantially as it exists today. Further outbuildings were constructed around the château.

Commarin avoided pillage during the French Revolution and although the Germans occupied it in World War II, it was treated with respect and retained its magnificent parquet floors and tapestries.

In the 19th century, the parterre gardens in the French style were swept away in favor of a fashionable parc à l’Anglaise, an English landscape garden. In 2004, the dense growth of trees immediately round the château was cut down and a reconstruction of the former formal gardens was undertaken.

The Château de Commarin is open to visitors from April through November.

== See also ==
- List of castles in France
