= Commarin =

- Commune
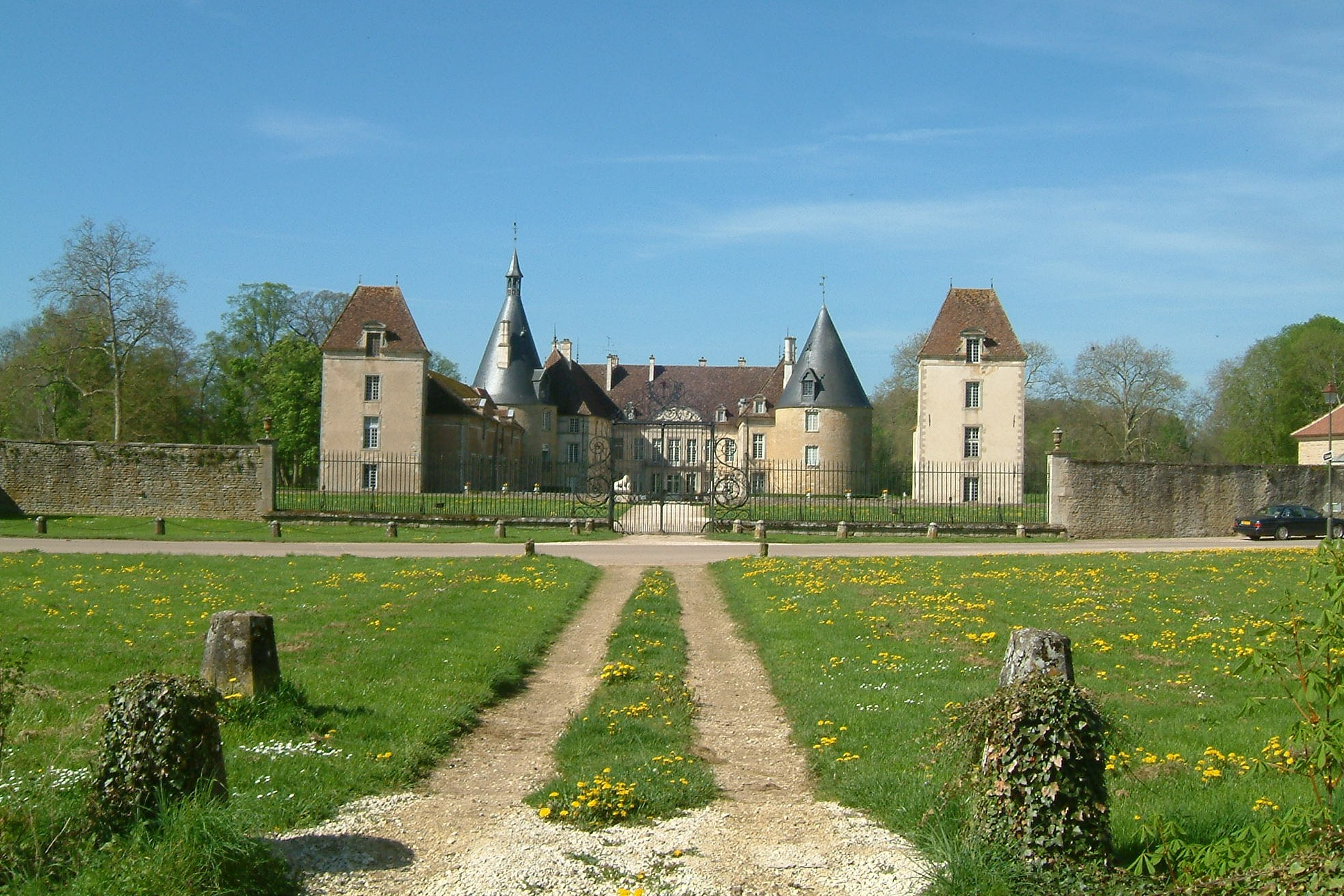
- Chateau

- Coat of arms
- Location of Commarin
- Location within France Location within Bourgogne-Franche-Comté
- Coordinates: 47°15′27″N 4°38′59″E
- Country: France
- Region: Bourgogne-Franche-Comté
- Department: Côte-d'Or
- Arrondissement: Beaune
- Canton: Arnay-le-Duc

Government
  - Mayor (2020–2026): Michel Raffeau
- Area^{1}: 6.39 km^{2} (2.47 sq mi)
- Elevation: 376 m (1,234 ft)
- Highest elevation: 541 m (1,775 ft)
- Lowest elevation: 360 m (1,180 ft)
- Population (2023): 122
  - Density: 19.1/km^{2} (49.4/sq mi)
- Time zone: UTC+01:00 (CET)
  - Summer (DST): UTC+02:00 (CEST)
- INSEE/Postal code: 21187 /21320
- ^{1} French Land Register data, which excludes lakes, ponds, glaciers > 1 km^{2} (0.386 sq mi or 247 acres) and river estuaries.

Commarin (French pronunciation: [kɔmaʁɛ̃]) is a commune in the Côte-d'Or department in eastern France.

== Population ==
Historical population
Year	Pop.	±% p.a.
1968	175	—
1975	132	−3.95%
1982	157	+2.51%
1990	147	−0.82%
1999	142	−0.38%
2007	125	−1.58%
2012	116	−1.48%
2017	123	+1.18%
2023	122	−0.14%
Source: INSEE

== Sights ==
The most remarkable building in Commarin is the château, parts of which date back to the 14th century.

== See also ==
- Communes of the Côte-d'Or department
