= Château d'Yèvre-le-Châtel =

Ruined castle in Yèvre-la-Ville, France

Coordinates: 48.1604°N 2.3347°E

- Near Yèvre-la-Ville in France
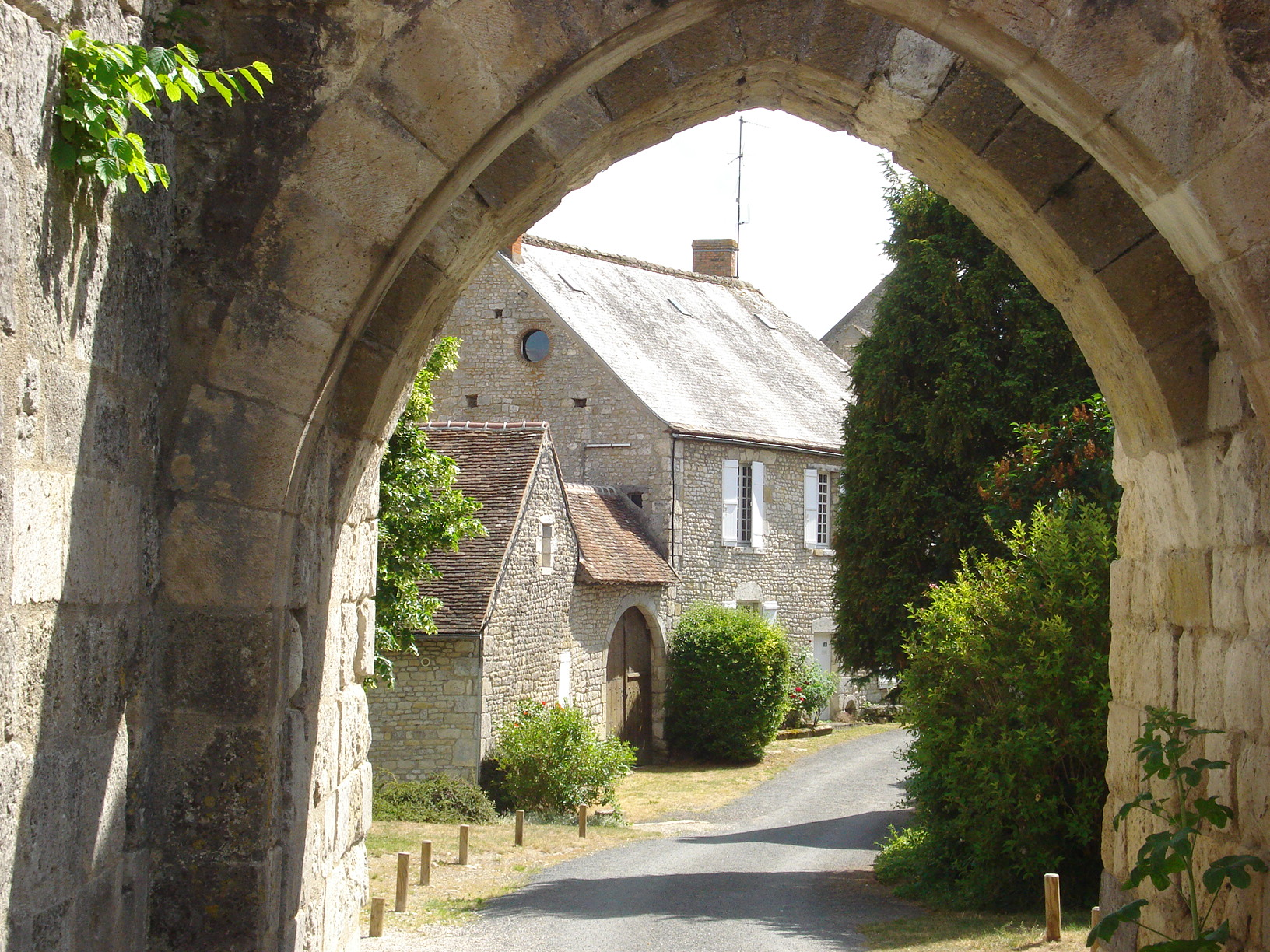

Location

The Château d'Yèvre-le-Châtel is a ruined castle in the commune of Yèvre-la-Ville in the Loiret département of France. The castle dates from the first quarter of the 13th century and is located in the hamlet of Yèvre-le-Châtel, to the north of the commune.

The property of the commune, it has been listed since 1862 as a monument historique by the French Ministry of Culture.

== See also ==
- List of castles in France
