= Château de Caumale =

Castle in Nouvelle-Aquitaine, France

Coordinates: 43°59′00″N 0°02′01″E

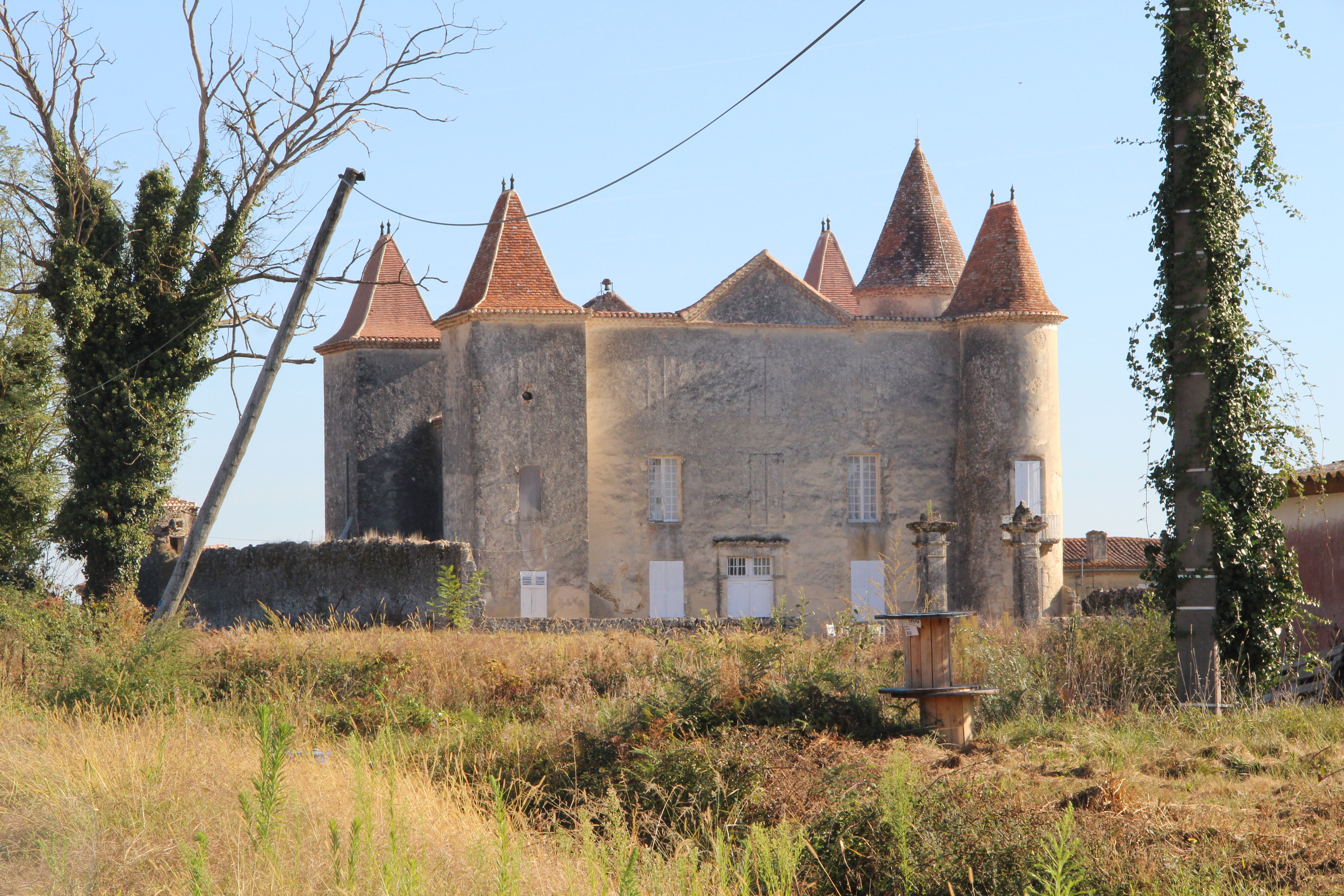
Caumale Castle

The Château de Caumale is a castle in Escalans, Landes, Nouvelle-Aquitaine, France. It was completed in the 12th century.
