= List of châteaux in the Midi-Pyrénées =

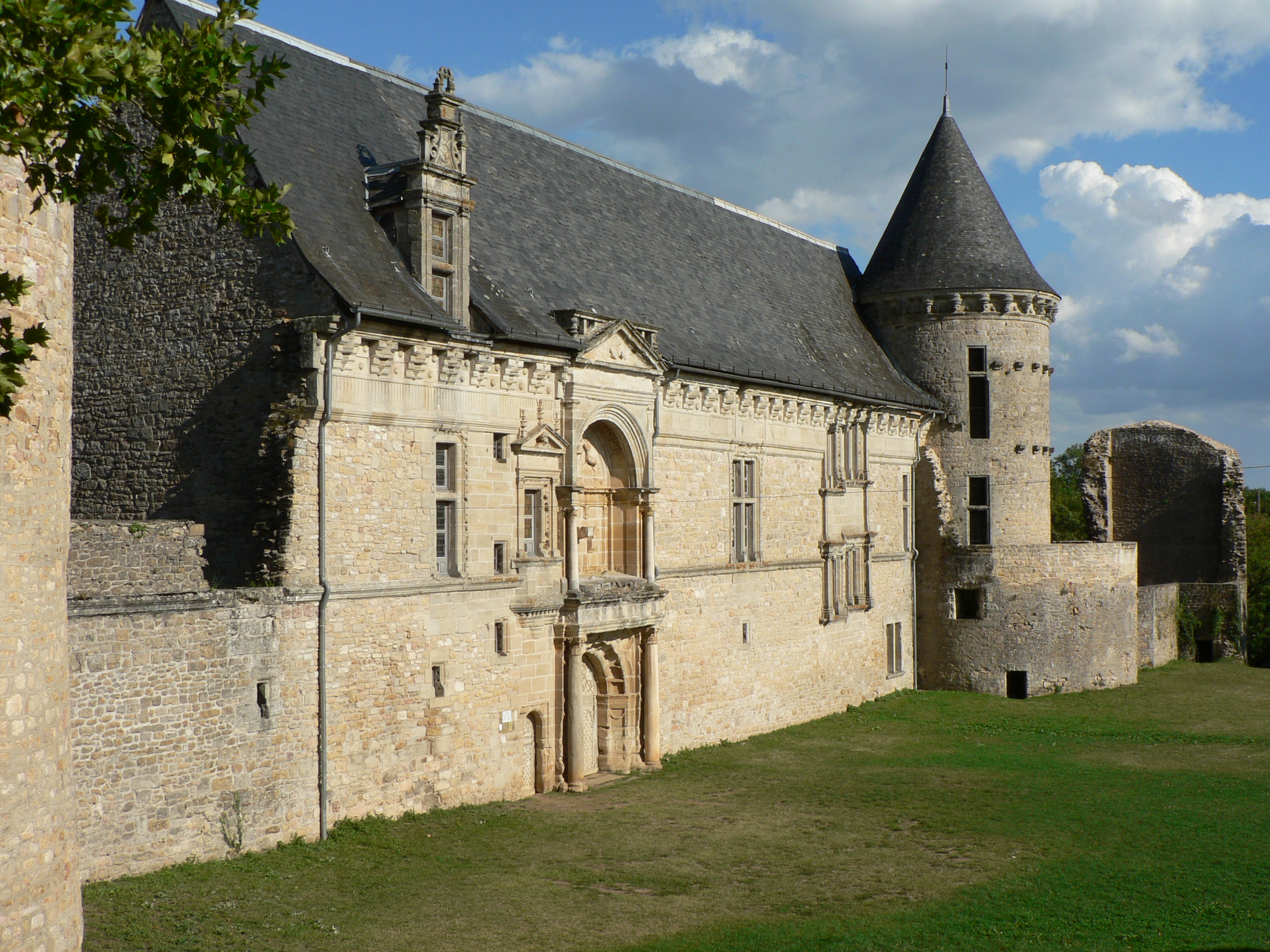
Château d'Assier

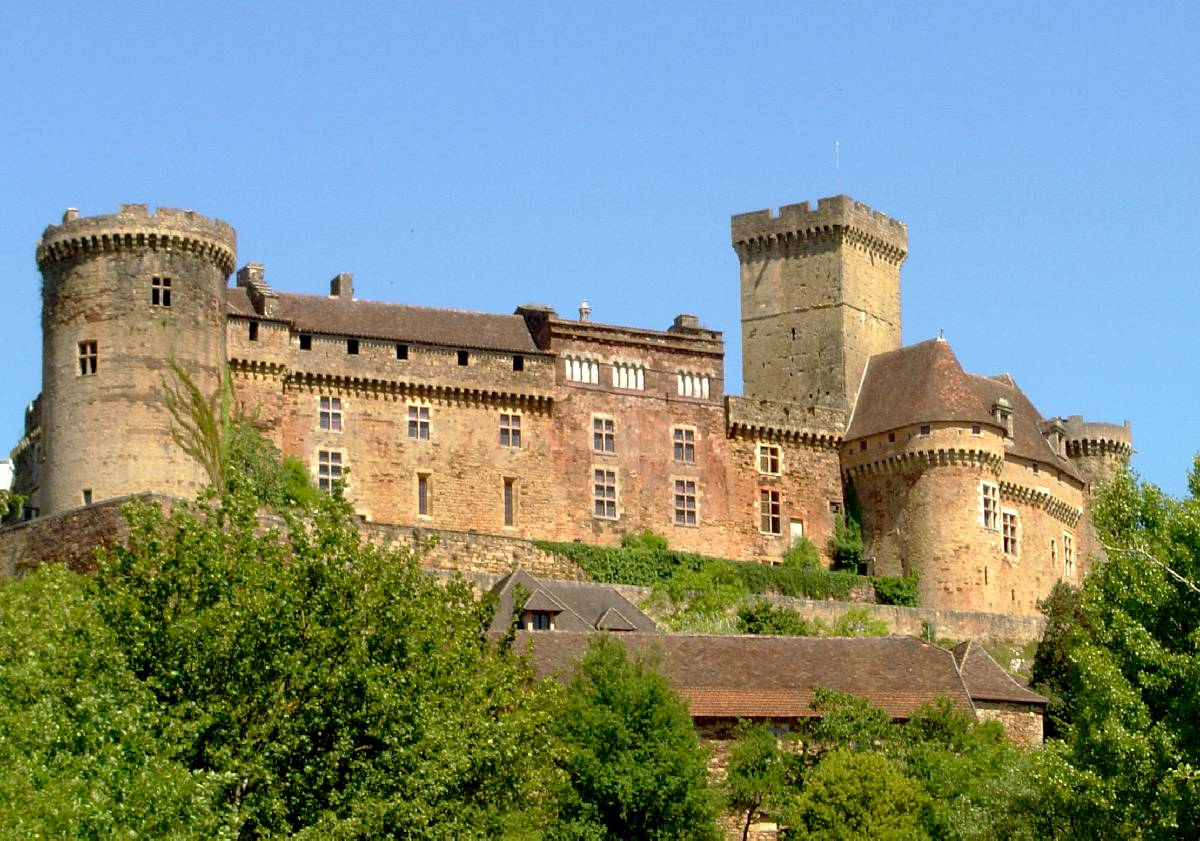
Château de Castelnau-Bretenoux

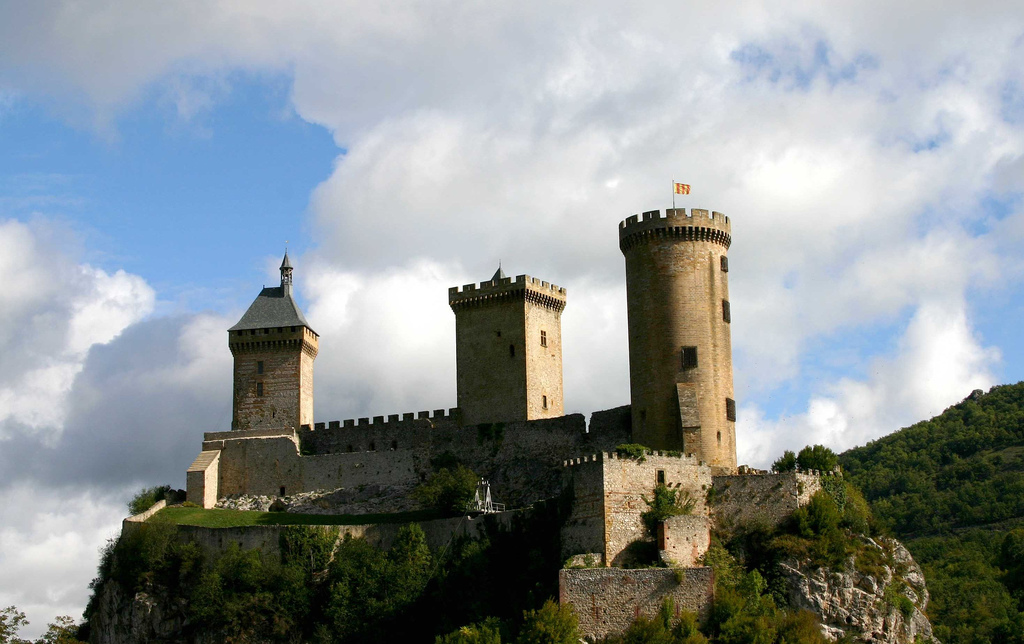
Château de Foix

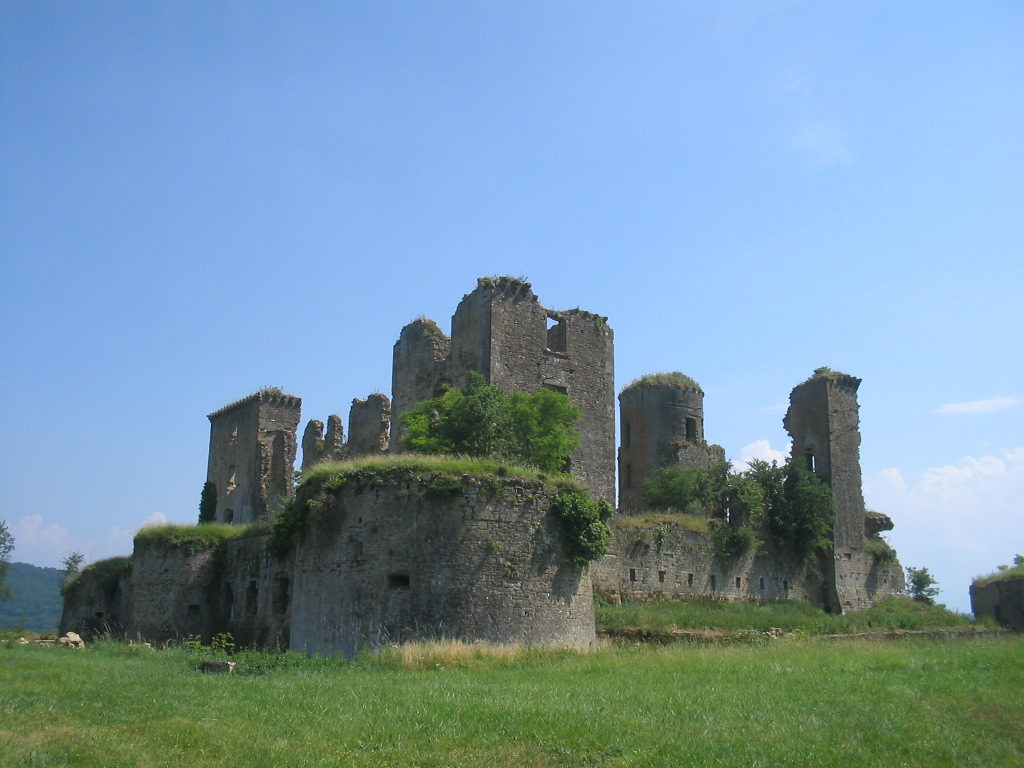
Château de Lagarde

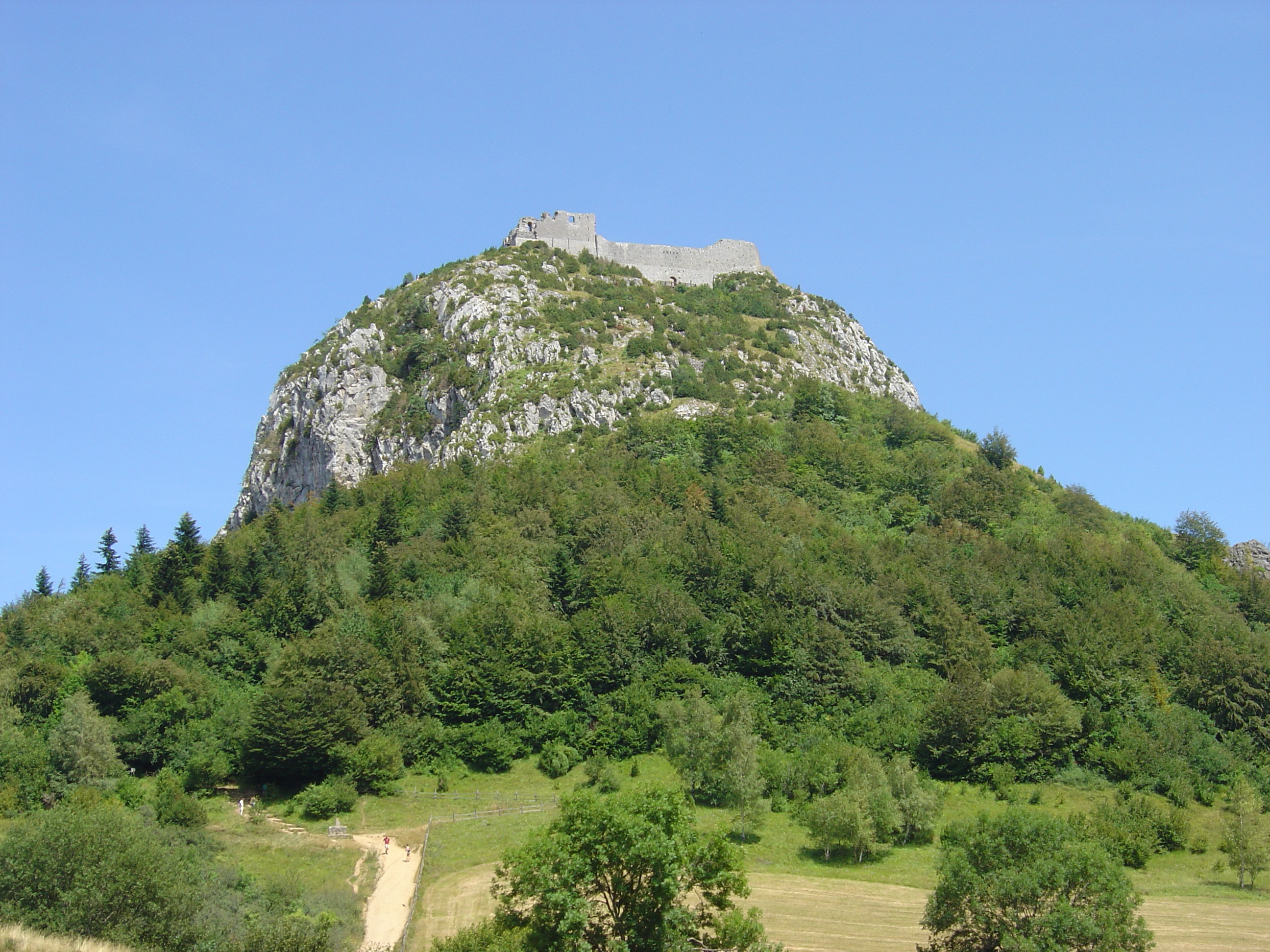
Château de Montségur

This is a list of châteaux in the former region of Midi-Pyrénées, France.

== Ariège ==
- Castelet du Castet in Aleu, dating from the 17th or 18th century
- Château d’Alliat in Alliat
- Château d'Artix in Artix
- Château d'Arvigna in Arvigna (Cathar)
- Château d'Aucazein in Aucazein
- Château de Montréal-de-Sos in Auzat
- Château d'Aynat in Bédeilhac-et-Aynat (ruined)
- Château de Castelbon in Betchat
- Château des Salenques in Les Bordes-sur-Arize
- Château de Marveille in Les Bordes-sur-Arize
- Château de Ligny in Les Bordes-sur-Arize
- Château de Gudanes in Château-Verdun
- Château de Foix in Foix (fortified castle)
- Château de Lagarde
- Château de Léran in Léran
- Château de Lordat in Lordat
- Château de Miglos in Miglos
- Château de Montaillou in Montaillou
- Château de Montségur in Montségur (ruined)
- Château de Prat in Prat-Bonrepaux
- Château de Quérigut in Quérigut (ruined)
- Château de Roquefixade in Roquefixade (ruined)
- Château de Rouze in Rouze
- Château d'Usson in Rouze (ruined)

== Aveyron ==
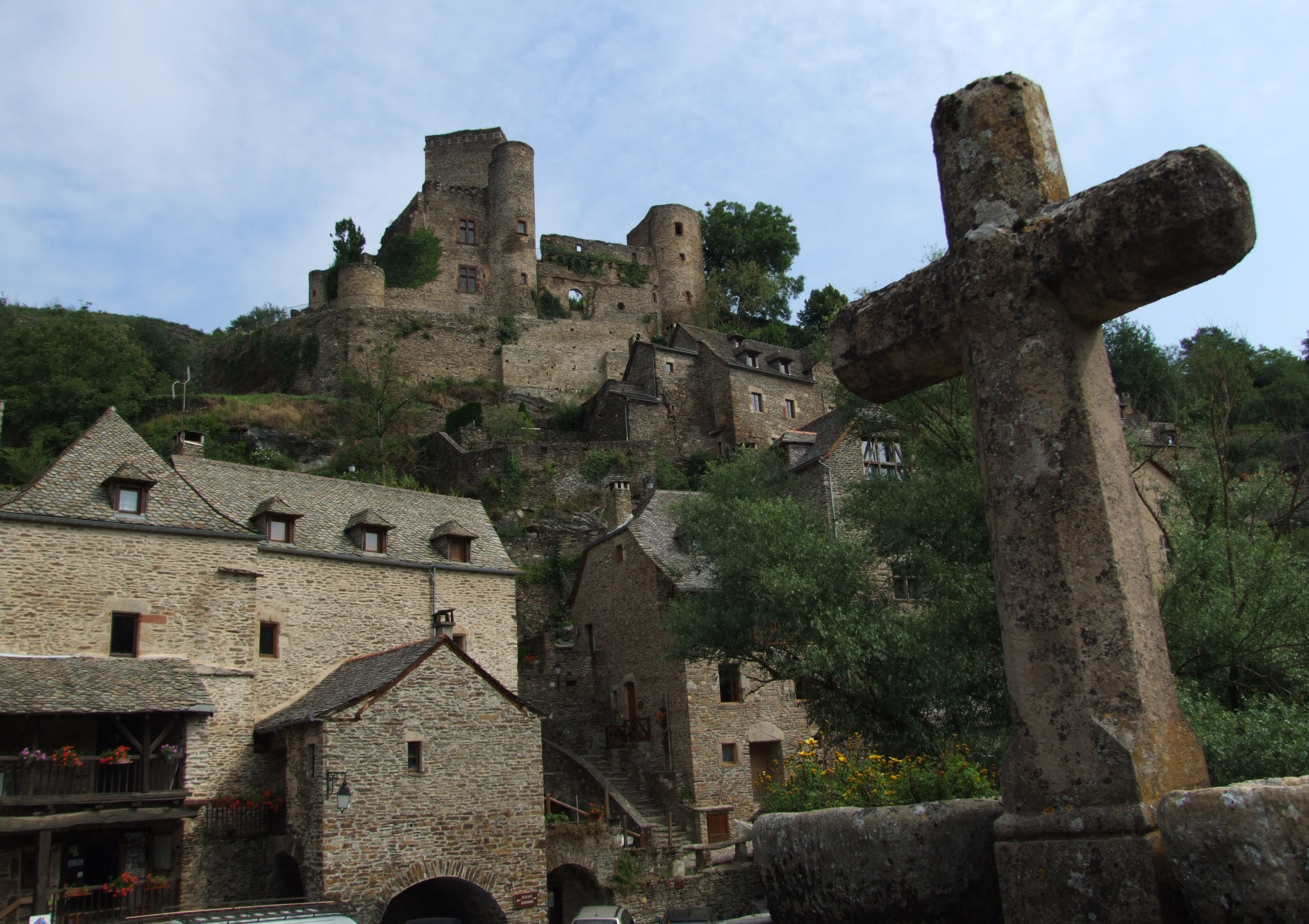
Château de Belcastel

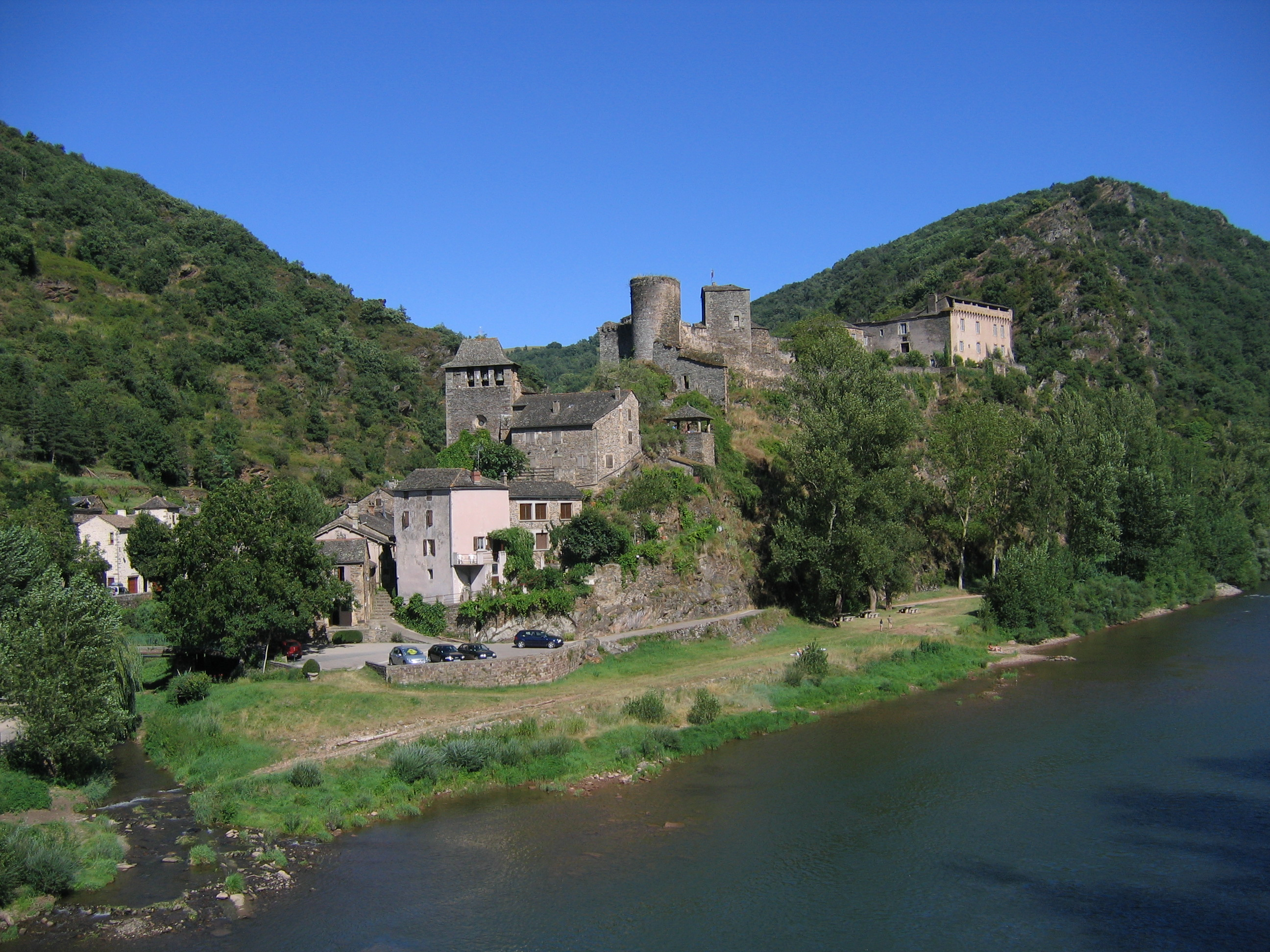
Brousse-le-Château

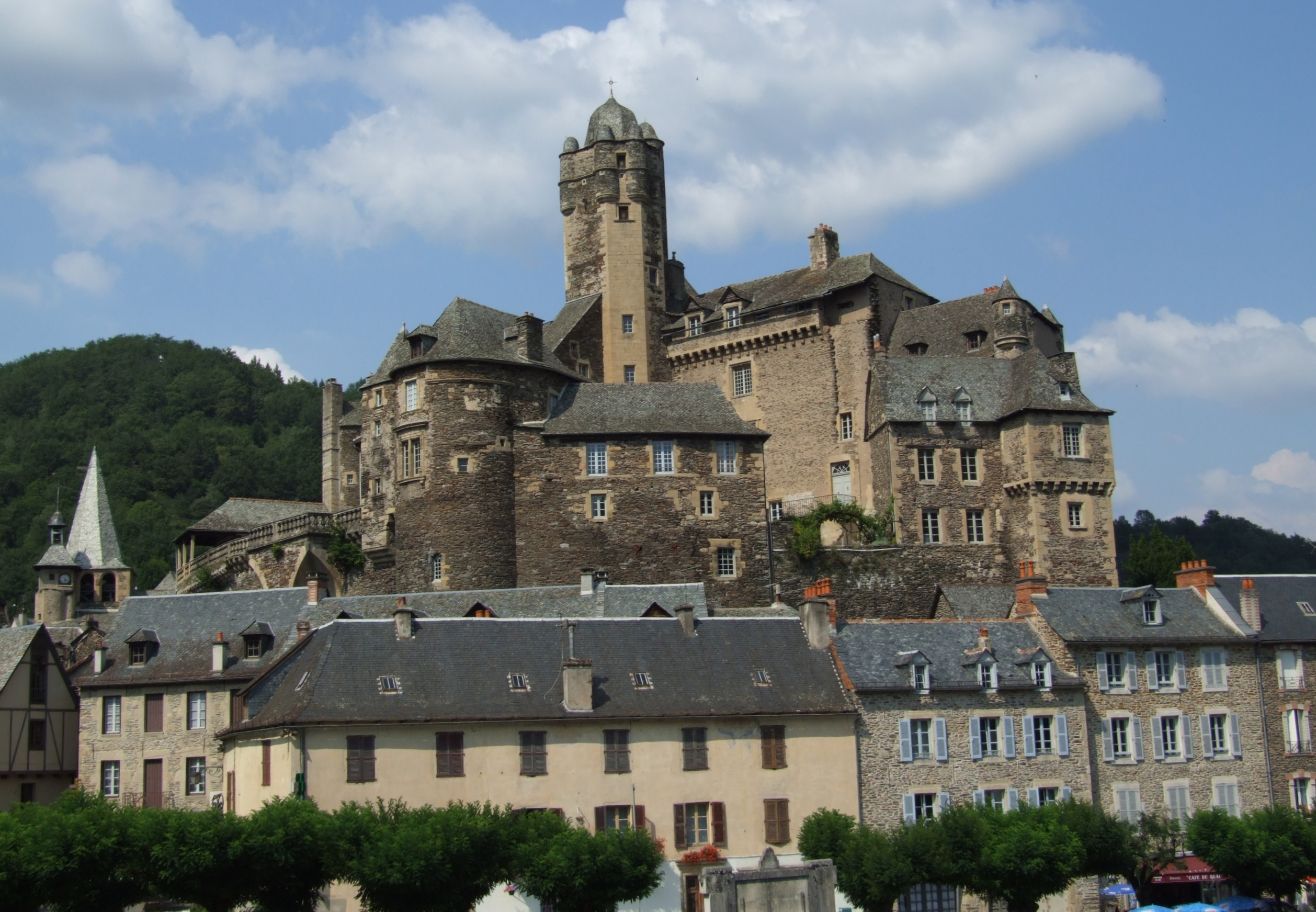
Château d'Estaing

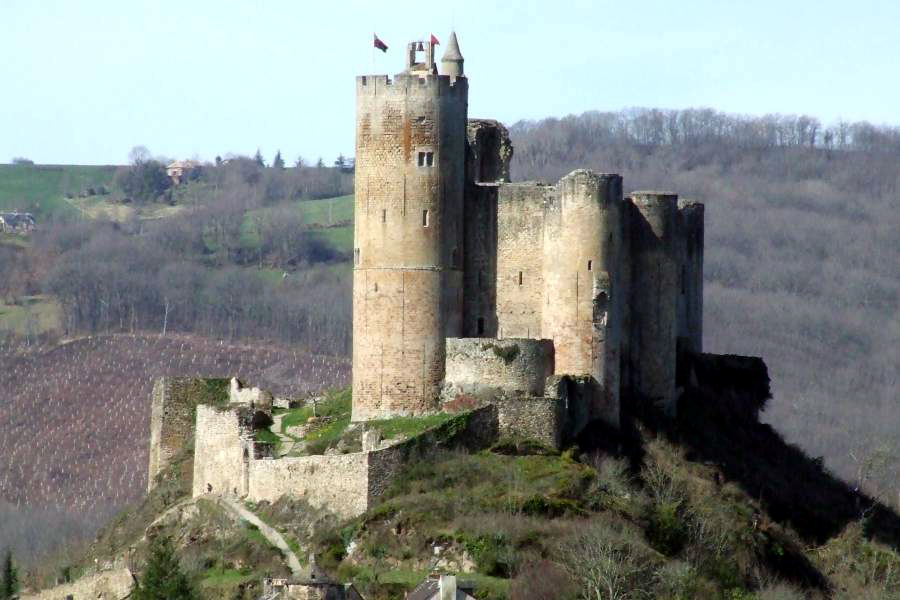
Château de Najac

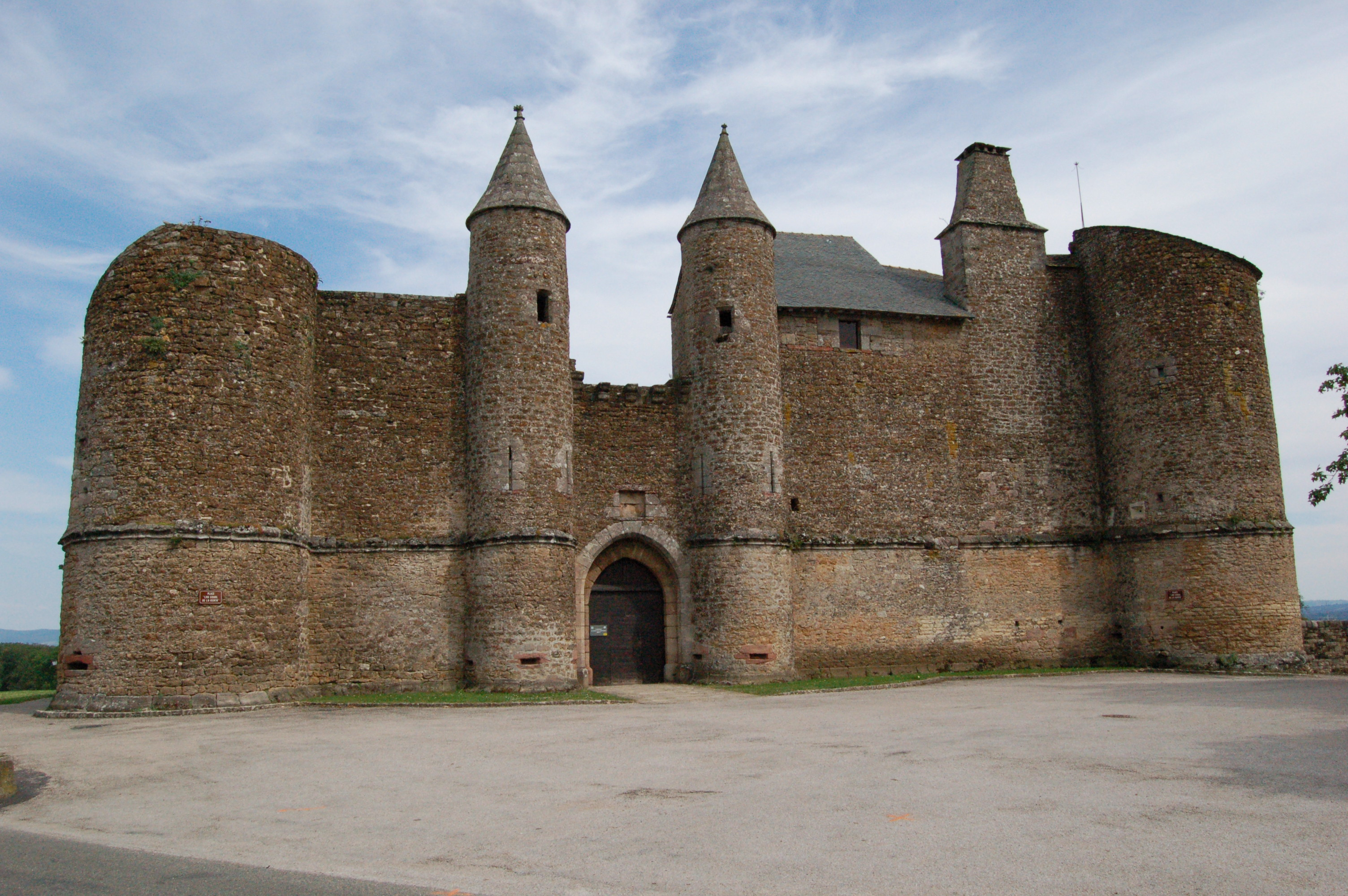
Château d'Onet-le-Château

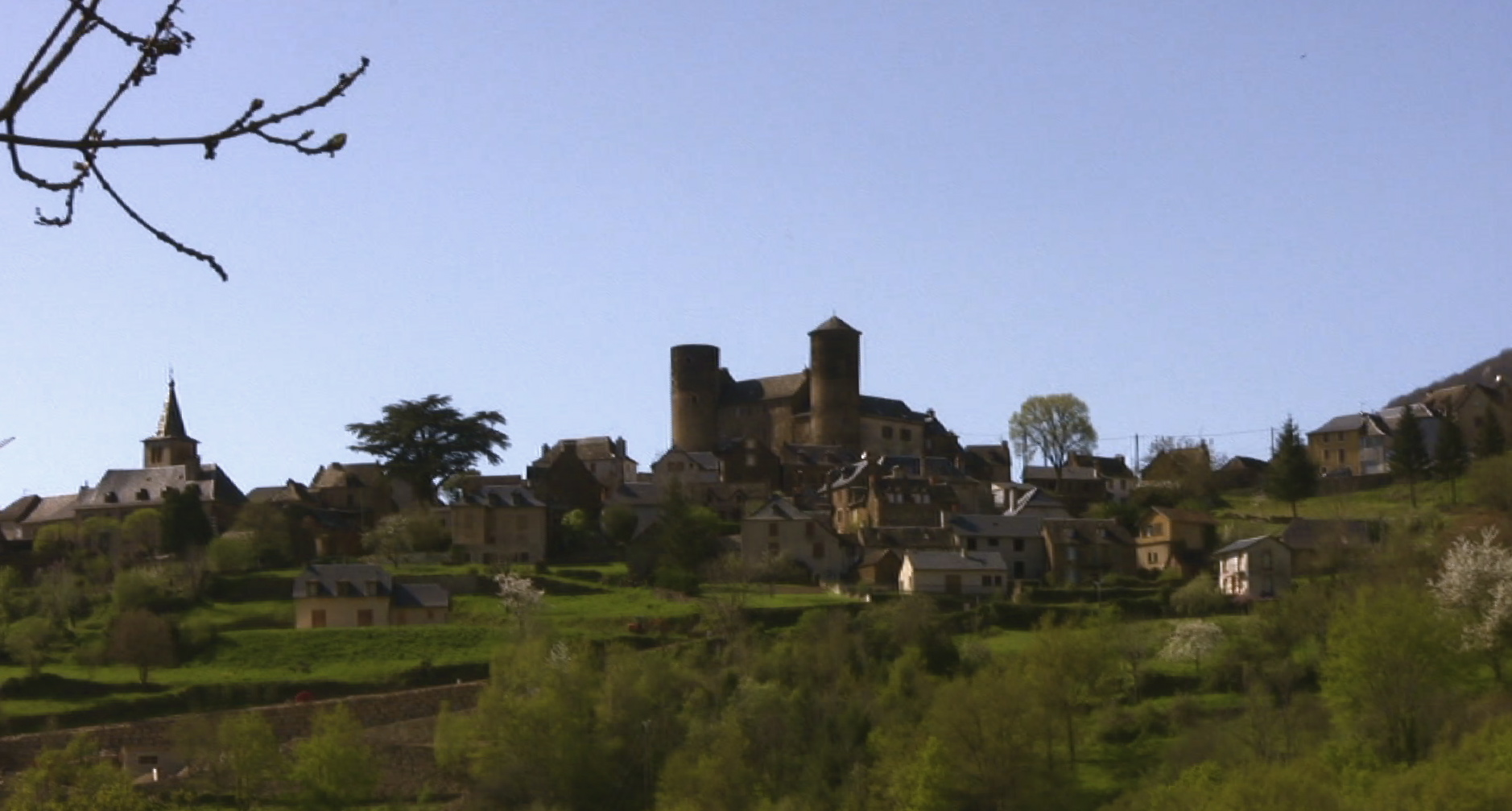
Château de Pomayrols, Aveyron

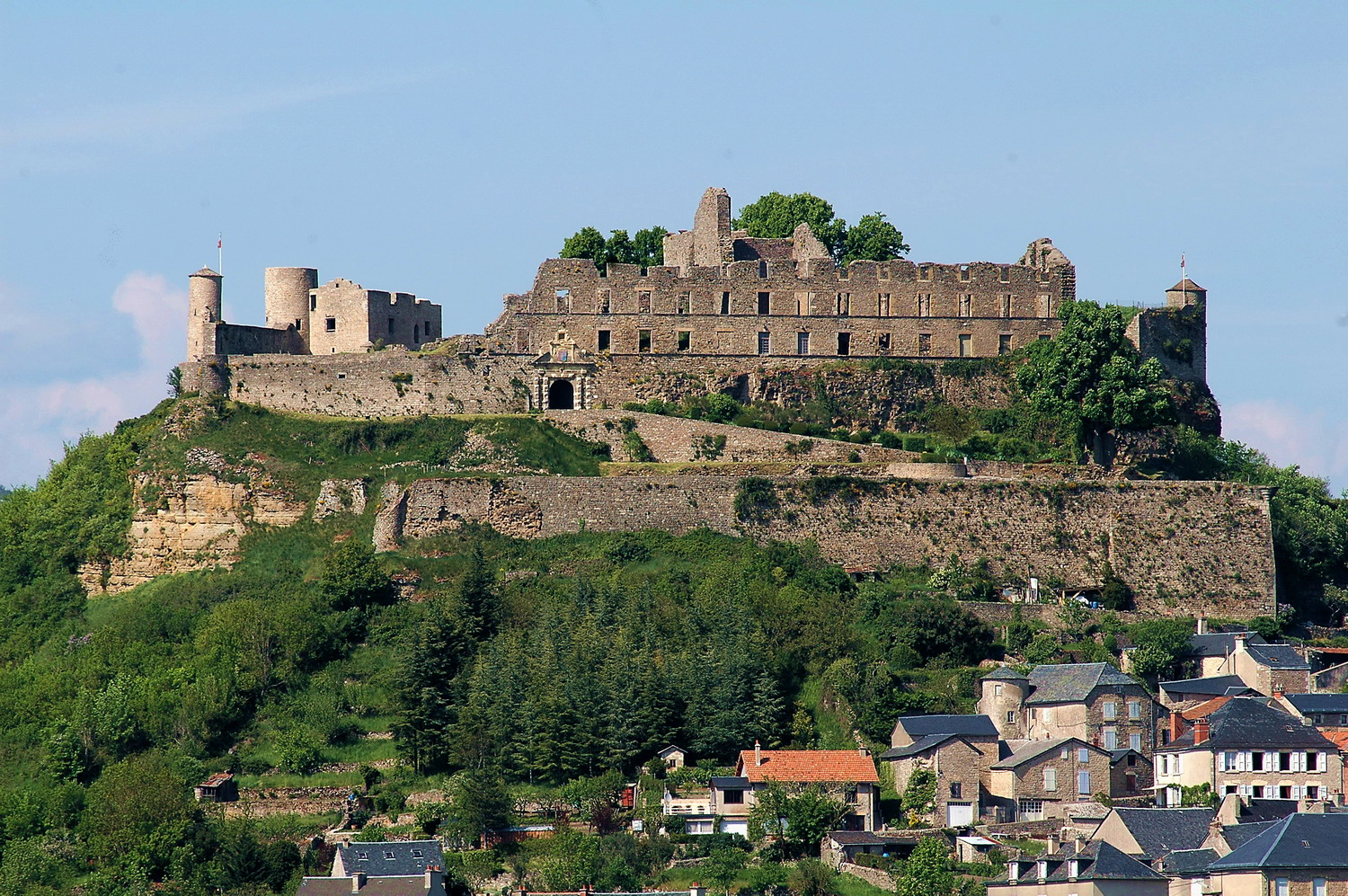
Château de Sévérac

- Château de Balsac in Balsac
- Château de Bertholène in Bertholène (ruined)
- Château de Belcastel in Belcastel
- Château du Bosc in Naucelle
- Château de Bournazel
- Château de Brousse in Brousse-le-Château
- Château de Brusque in Brusque
- Château de Calmont d'Olt, in Espalion (ruined)
- Château de Coupiac in Coupiac, (fortified castle)
- Château d'Estaing in Estaing
- Château de Fayet in Fayet
- Château de Floyrac in Onet-le-Château
- Château de Fontanges in Onet-le-Château
- Château de Gissac in Gissac
- Château de Graves
- Château de Guizard in Villecomtal
- Château de Kermaria, 19th century in Morlhon-le-Haut
- Château de Lacaze (Peyrusse) in Peyrusse-le-Roc
- Château de Latour-sur-Sorgues in Marnhagues-et-Latour
- Château de Masse in Espalion
- Château de Montaigut in Gissac
- Château de Montalègre in Versols-et-Lapeyre
- Château de Najac in Najac
- Château d'Onet-le-Château in Onet-le-Château
- Château de Vabre in Onet-le-Château (Renaissance château)
- Domaine de Vialatelle in Onet-le-Château
- Château de Pagax in Flagnac (ruined)
- Château de Peyrelade in Rivière-sur-Tarn
- Château de Peyrusse-le-Roc, in Peyrusse-le-Roc (ruined)
- Château de Planèze in Luc-la-Primaube
- Château du Puech in Villecomtal
- Château de Pomayrols
- Château de Pruines in Pruines
- Château de Saint-Izaire in Saint-Izaire
- Château de Selves, 15th century, modified in the 18th century, in La Vinzelle commune of Grand-Vabre
- Château de la Servayrie in Mouret
- Château de Sévérac in Sévérac-le-Château (fortified castle)
- Château de Sorgue in Sorgue
- Château de Taurines in Centrès
- Château de Valon in Lacroix-Barrez
- Château de Versols in Versols-et-Lapeyre
- Château de Vézins in Vézins-de-Lévézou

== Gers ==
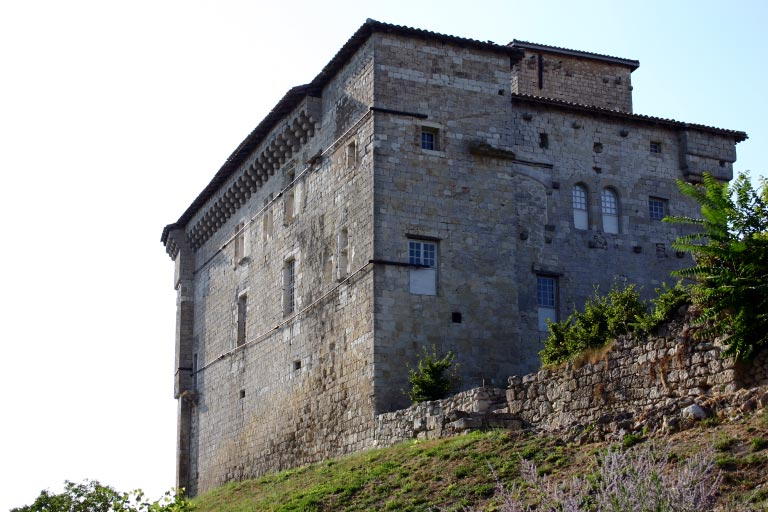
Château de Plieux

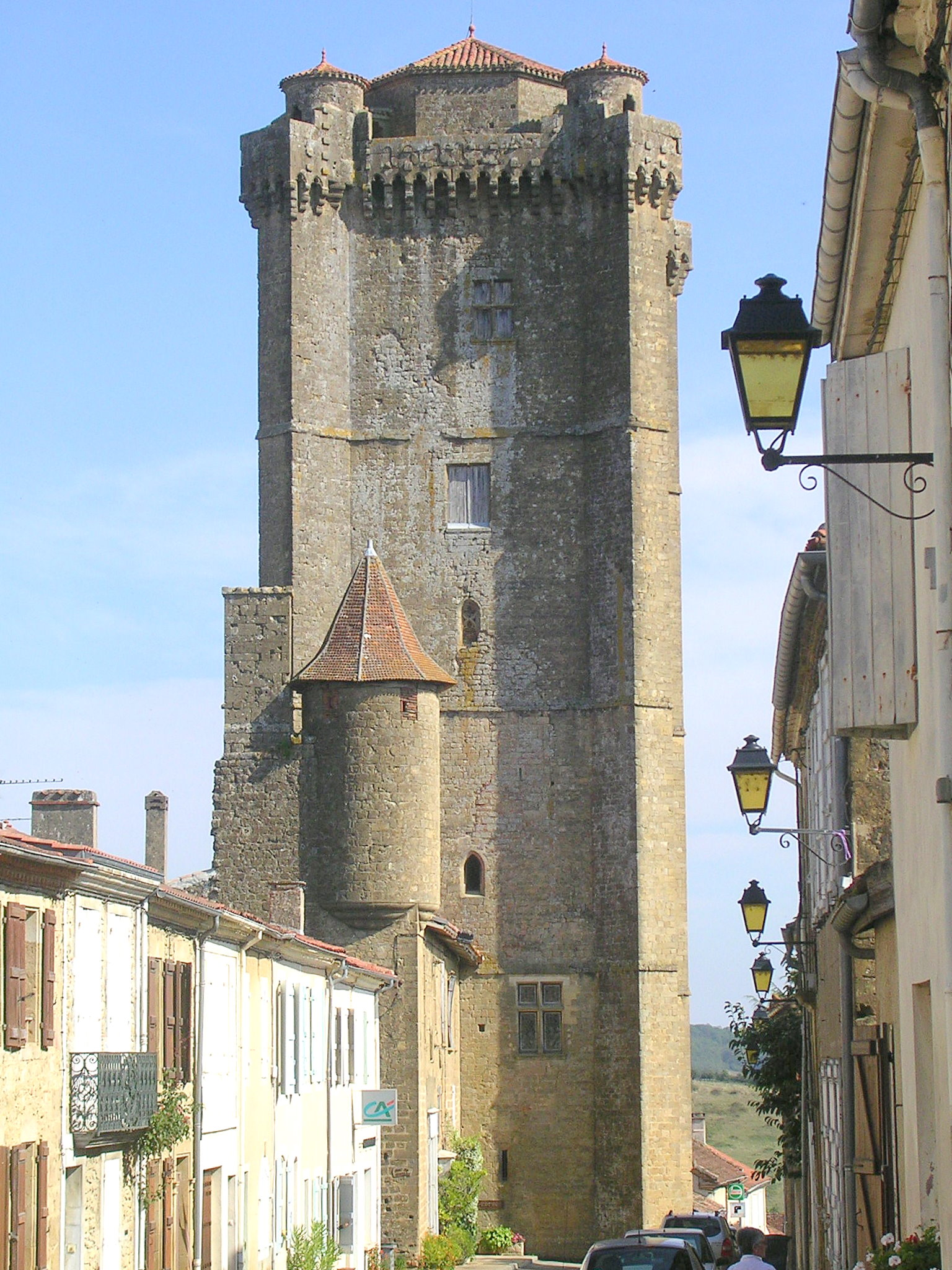
Bassoues

Ancient province of Gascony

- See Château gascon
- Château d’Ampelle in Pergain-Taillac
- Château d'Avezan in Avezan
- Château de Bassoues in Bassoues
- Château du Busca-Maniban in Mansencôme
- Château de Castelmore in Lupiac
- Château de Caumont in Cazaux-Savès
- Château de Fieux in Miradoux
- Château de Fourcès in Fourcès
- Château de Herrebouc in Saint-Jean-Poutge
- Château de Lacassagne in Saint-Avit-Frandat
- Château de Larressingle in Larressingle
- Château de Loubersan in Loubersan
- Château de Lasserre in Béraut
- Château de Lavardens in Lavardens
- Château de Maignaut in Maignaut-Tauzia
- Château de Manlèche in Pergain-Taillac
- Château de Mansencôme in Mansencôme
- Château de Masseube in Masseube
- Château de Mirande in Mirande
- Château de Montaut-les-Créneaux in Montaut-les-Créneaux
- Château de Plieux in Plieux
- Château de Rouillac in Gimbrède
- Château de Sainte-Mère, at Sainte-Mère
- Château de Simorre, at Simorre
- Château du Tauzia, at Maignaut-Tauzia
- Tour de Termes d'Armagnac, at Termes-d'Armagnac, listed, visitable, fortified chateau
- Château de Labarrère, at Labarrère
- Château de Cassaigne, at Cassaigne
- Château de Castelnau d'Auzan, at Castelnau-d'Auzan

== Haute-Garonne ==
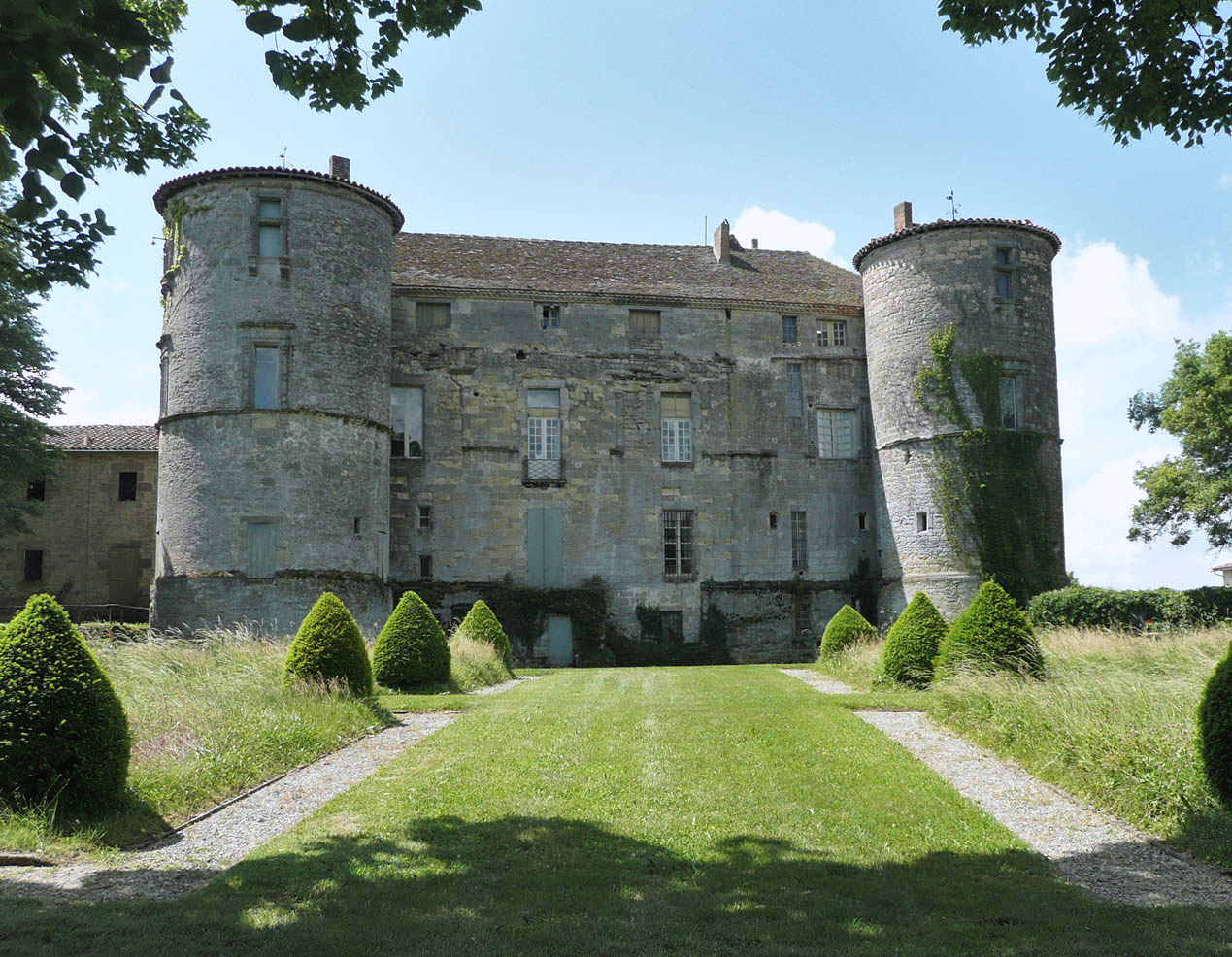
Château de Loubens-Lauragais

- Château d'Aigrefeuille in Aigrefeuille
- Château d'Alliez (Cedar Clinic) in Cornebarrieu
- Château d'Aurignac, in Aurignac
- Château d'Azas, in Azas
- Château Lafont in Bagnères-de-Luchon
- Château de Bonrepos in Bonrepos-Riquet
- Château de Boussan, in Boussan
- Château de Brax, in Brax
- Château du Cabirol in Colomiers
- Château de Calmont, in Calmont
- Château de Cambiac, in Cambiac
- Château de la Cassagnère in Cugnaux
- Château de Castagnac, in Castagnac
- Château Catala in Saint-Orens-de-Gameville
- Château de Cornebarrieu in Cornebarrieu
- Château du Coustela in Gratentour
- Palais des Evêques du Comminges in Alan
- Château de Fonbeauzard in Fonbeauzard
- Château de Fourquevaux, in Fourquevaux
- Château de Gagnac in Gagnac-sur-Garonne
- Château de Galié, in Galié
- Château de Gensac-sur-Garonne in Gensac-sur-Garonne
- Château de Gourdan-Polignan in Gourdan-Polignan
- Château de Grand Selve, in Toulouse
- Château de Hautpoul in Cugnaux
- Château d'Izaut-de-l'Hôtel in Izaut-de-l'Hôtel
- Château de Jean, in Villariès
- Château de Juzes, in Juzes
- Château de Labastide-Paumès, in Labastide-Paumès
- Château de Lacroix in Lacroix-Falgarde
- Château de Lafitte-Vigordane in Lafitte-Vigordane
- Château de Laran in Cornebarrieu
- Château de Laréole, in Laréole
- Château de Larroque, in Larroque
- Château de Latoue, in Latoue
- Château de Launac, in Launac
- Château de Launaguet in Launaguet
- Château de Loubens-Lauragais, to Loubens-Lauragais, listed, visitable, fortified chateau
- Le Pavillon Louis XVI and its park in Cugnaux
- Château de Maurens in Cugnaux
- Château de Merville, in Merville
- Château de Montespan, in Montespan
- Château de Novital in Gagnac-sur-Garonne
- Château de Percin in Seilh
- Château de Pibrac, in Pibrac
- Château de Pinsaguel, in Pinsaguel
- Château de Pontié in Cornebarrieu
- Château des Raspaud in Colomiers
- Château des Ramassiers in Colomiers
- Château de Redon : in Lagardelle-sur-Lèze 18th century
- Château de la Renery in Gratentour
- Château de Reynerie, in Toulouse
- Château de Rochemontès in Seilh
- Château de Rudelle, in Muret
- Château de Saint-Élix-le-Château, in Saint-Élix-le-Château
- Château de Saint-Élix-Séglan Château, in Saint-Élix-Séglan
- Château de Sainte-Marie, in Longages
- Château de Saint-Félix-Lauragais, in Saint-Félix-Lauragais
- Château de Saint-Jory, in Saint-Jory
- Château de Saint-Paul-d'Oueil, in Saint-Paul-d'Oueil
- Château de la Salvetat-Saint-Gilles, in La Salvetat-Saint-Gilles
- Château de Sarremezan, in Sarremezan
- Château des Sœurs : in Lagardelle-sur-Lèze 16th century
- Château de Tournefeuille in Tournefeuille
- Château de Vallègue, in Vallègue
- Château de Valmirande, in Montréjeau
- Château de Vieillevigne, in Vieillevigne
- Château du Vignaou : in Lagardelle-sur-Lèze end of the 18th century, renovated in 1998
- Château de Villefranche, in Villeneuve-lès-Bouloc

== Hautes-Pyrénées ==
Ancient province of Gascony

- Château d' Adé in Adé (ruins)
- Château fort de Lourdes, in Lourdes
- Château de Luz-Saint-Sauveur, in Luz-Saint-Sauveur
- Château de Mauvezin, in Mauvezin
- Château de Siradan, in Siradan

== Lot ==
The department of Lot possesses about 500 châteaux-like homes.

- Château d'Assier, at Assier (renaissance)
- Château de Barasc, at Béduer
- Château de la Blainie, at Albas
- Château de Caïx, at Luzech
- Château de Capdenac, at Capdenac
- Château de Castelnau-Bretenoux, at Prudhomat
- Château de Chambert, at Floressas
- Château de Charry, at Montcuq
- Château des Doyens, at Carennac
- Château de Fontauda, at Montcuq
- Château Lagrézette or Château de La Grézette, at Caillac
- Château de Lantis, at Dégagnac
- Château de Larroque-Toirac, at Larroque-Toirac
- Château de Mercuès, at Mercuès
- Château de Montal at Saint-Jean-Lespinasse
- Château de Montcuq, at Montcuq
- Château de La Pannonie, at Couzou
- Château de Pechrigal, at Saint-Clair
- Château de Pleysse, at Montcuq
- Château de Rocamadour, at Rocamadour
- Château de Ventalays, at Montcuq

== Tarn ==
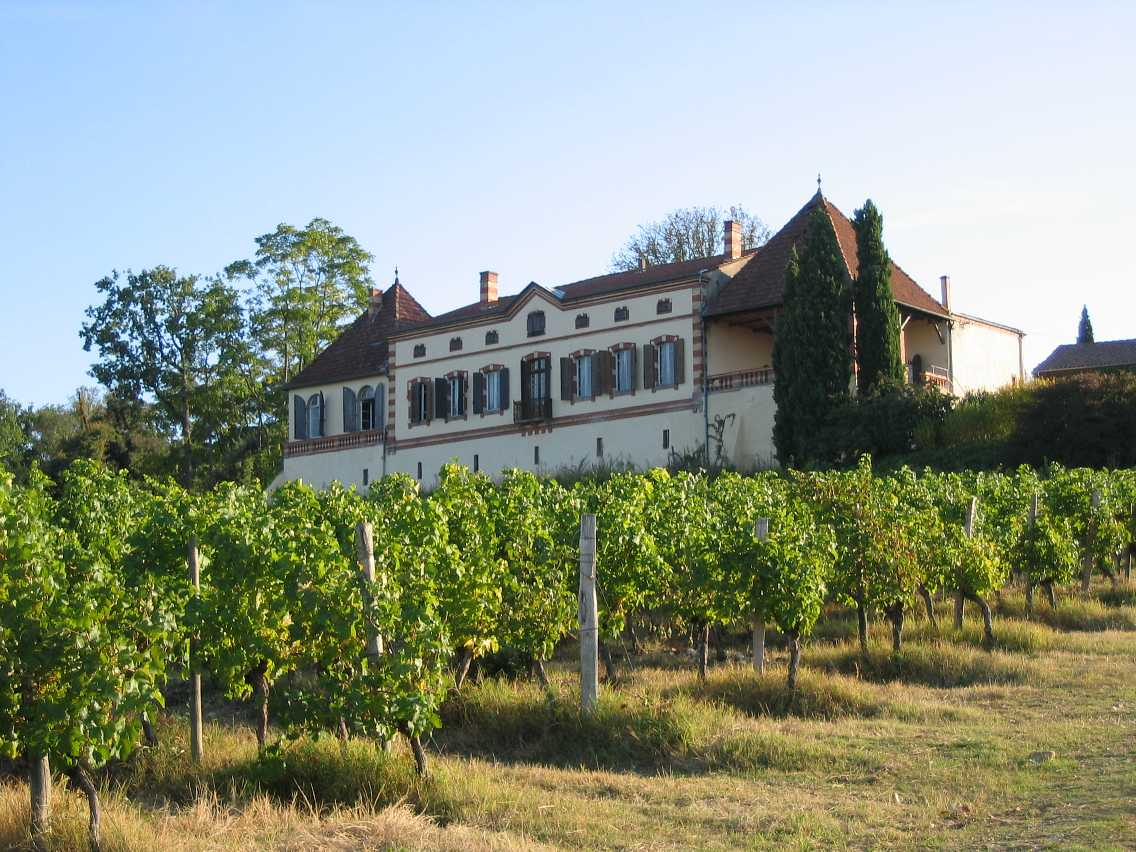
Château Labastidié à Florentin (Tarn)

- Château Labastidié at Florentin (vineyard)
- Château d'Aiguefonde at Aiguefonde
- Château-musée du Cayla at Andillac
- Château d'Arifat at Arifat
- Château de Gos at Barre
- Château de Brassac at Brassac
- Château de La Bourélie at Brens
- Château de Salettes at Cahuzac-sur-Vère
- Château de la Serre at Cambounet-sur-le-Sor
- Château de Castelnau-de-Lévis at Castelnau-de-Lévis
- Château de Corduriès at Castelnau-de-Montmiral
- Château de Fézembat at Castelnau-de-Montmiral
- Château de Mazières at Castelnau-de-Montmiral
- Château de Meyragues at Castelnau-de-Montmiral
- Château de Curvalle at Curvalle
- Château de Castellas at Dourgne
- Château de Combefa at Combefa
- Château de Ferrières at Ferrières
- Château de Fiac (Tarn) at Fiac
- Château de Florentin at Florentin
- Château de Lagassié at Garrigue
- Pech Massou at Giroussens
- Château de Belbèze at Giroussens
- Château de Lézignac at Graulhet
- Château du Travet at Labastide-Saint-Georges
- Château de Lacaze (Tarn) at Lacaze
- Château de Camalières at Lacaze
- Château de Magrin at Magrin
- Château de Mailhoc at Mailhoc
- Château d'en Clausade at Marzens
- Château du Masnau-Massuguiès at Le Masnau-Massuguiès
- Château de Massaguel at Massaguel
- Château d'Hautpoul at Mazamet
- Château du Milhars at Milhars
- Château de Montfa at Montfa
- Château de Montpinier at Montpinier
- Château du Poutac at Moularès
- Château de le Vergnet at Moularès
- Château de Mouzieys-Panens at Mouzieys-Panens
- Château de Boissezon (tower) à Murat-sur-Vèbre (ruins)
- Château de Canac at Murat-sur-Vèbre
- Château de Nages at Nages
- Château de Montespieu at Navès
- Château de Penne at Penne
- Château de Montlédier at Pont-de-Larn
- Château du Tour in Prades
- Château des capitaines-gouverneurs in Puycelsi
- Château Cap de Castel in Puylaurens
- Château de Rayssac in Rayssac
- Château de Roquevidal in Roquevidal
- Château de Saint-Agnan in Saint-Agnan
- Château de La Bancalié in Saint-Antonin-de-Lacalm
- Château de Labastide vassals in Saint-Grégoire
- Château de Cussac in Saint-Grégoire
- Château de Saint-Martin-Laguépie in Saint-Martin-Laguépie
- Château de Sendrone in Saïx
- Château de Salvagnac in Salvagnac (ruined)
- Château de la Bonnette in Senouillac
- Château de Linardié in Senouillac
- Château de Saint-Martial in Senouillac
- Château de Mauriac in Senouillac
- Château de Grandval in Teillet
- Château de Trévien in Trévien

== Tarn-et-Garonne ==
- Château d'Auty in Auty
- Château de Bioule, in Bioule
- Château de Bouillac in Bouillac (Tarn-et-Garonne)
- Château de Bruniquel, in Bruniquel
- Château de Castelferrus in Castelferrus
- Château de Cas in Espinas
- Château de Caylus et garenne de Mondésir, in Caylus
- Château de Glatens in Glatens (ruined)
- Château de Gramont in Gramont
- Château de Labarthe in Labarthe
- Château du Clau in Labastide-Saint-Pierre
- Château abbatial de Larrazet in Larrazet
- Château à La Roque de Loze in Loze (ruined)
- Château de Mansonville in Mansonville
- Château de Montricoux in Montricoux
- Château de Monteils in Monteils
- Château de Lesparre in Montfermier (ruined)
- château-fort de Montgaillard in Montgaillard, (château fort)
- Château de Nègrepelisse in Négrepelisse
- Château de Saint-Roch in Le Pin
- Château de Piquecos in Piquecos
- Chateau de Pompignan on the D820 at Pompignan, about 25 km northwest of Toulouse
- Château de Reyniès in Reyniès
- Château de Saint-Clair in Saint-Clair
- Château Souloumiac in Saint-Nauphary
- Château de Saint-Nicolas-de-la-Grave in Saint-Nicolas-de-la-Grave
- Château de la Salle de Savenès in Savenès
- Château de Belpech in Varen
- Château de Blauzac in Vazerac
- Château de la "Reine Margot" in Verdun-sur-Garonne

== See also ==
- List of castles in France
