= Larroque, Haute-Garonne =

Larroque
- Commune
- Coat of arms
- Location of Larroque
- Location within France Location within Occitanie
- Coordinates: 43°11′47″N 0°36′37″E
- Country: France
- Region: Occitania
- Department: Haute-Garonne
- Arrondissement: Saint-Gaudens
- Canton: Saint-Gaudens

Government
  - Mayor (2020–2026): Jean-Louis Renon
- Area^{1}: 19.83 km^{2} (7.66 sq mi)
- Elevation: 345 m (1,132 ft)
- Highest elevation: 488 m (1,601 ft)
- Lowest elevation: 304 m (997 ft)
- Population (2023): 293
  - Density: 14.8/km^{2} (38.3/sq mi)
- Time zone: UTC+01:00 (CET)
  - Summer (DST): UTC+02:00 (CEST)
- INSEE/Postal code: 31276 /31580
- ^{1} French Land Register data, which excludes lakes, ponds, glaciers > 1 km^{2} (0.386 sq mi or 247 acres) and river estuaries.

Larroque (French pronunciation: [laʁɔk]; Occitan: Era Arròca) is a commune in the Haute-Garonne department in southwestern France.

== Population ==
Historical population
Year	Pop.	±% p.a.
1968	542	—
1975	466	−2.14%
1982	426	−1.27%
1990	415	−0.33%
1999	335	−2.35%
2007	311	−0.92%
2012	306	−0.32%
2017	292	−0.93%
2023	293	+0.06%
Source: INSEE

== Sights ==
The remains of a 12th-century castle keep, the Château de Larroque is the property of the commune. Seneschals of the counts of Foix, the chateau Larroque was retained until the fifteenth century, when it passed by marriage to the house of Foix-Rabat. The Larroque lords were co-Montmaurin country house founded with Foix (customs AWARDED 1317). They had their burial mound in the church of St. Sernin which it is believed at the base and foothills in the boundary wall of the old cemetery. Jeanne de la roque Corbeyran wife of Foix was buried about 1497. Auger de la roque was attorney of Foix in 1250, when the Viscount Nébouzan was not yet. This castle is certainly the oldest defense of Nébouzan primitive country which later became states and remained so until 1789. It has been listed since 1930 as a historic site by the French Ministry of Culture.

== See also ==
- Communes of the Haute-Garonne department
