= Château de Magrin =

Castle in Magrin (Tarn, France)

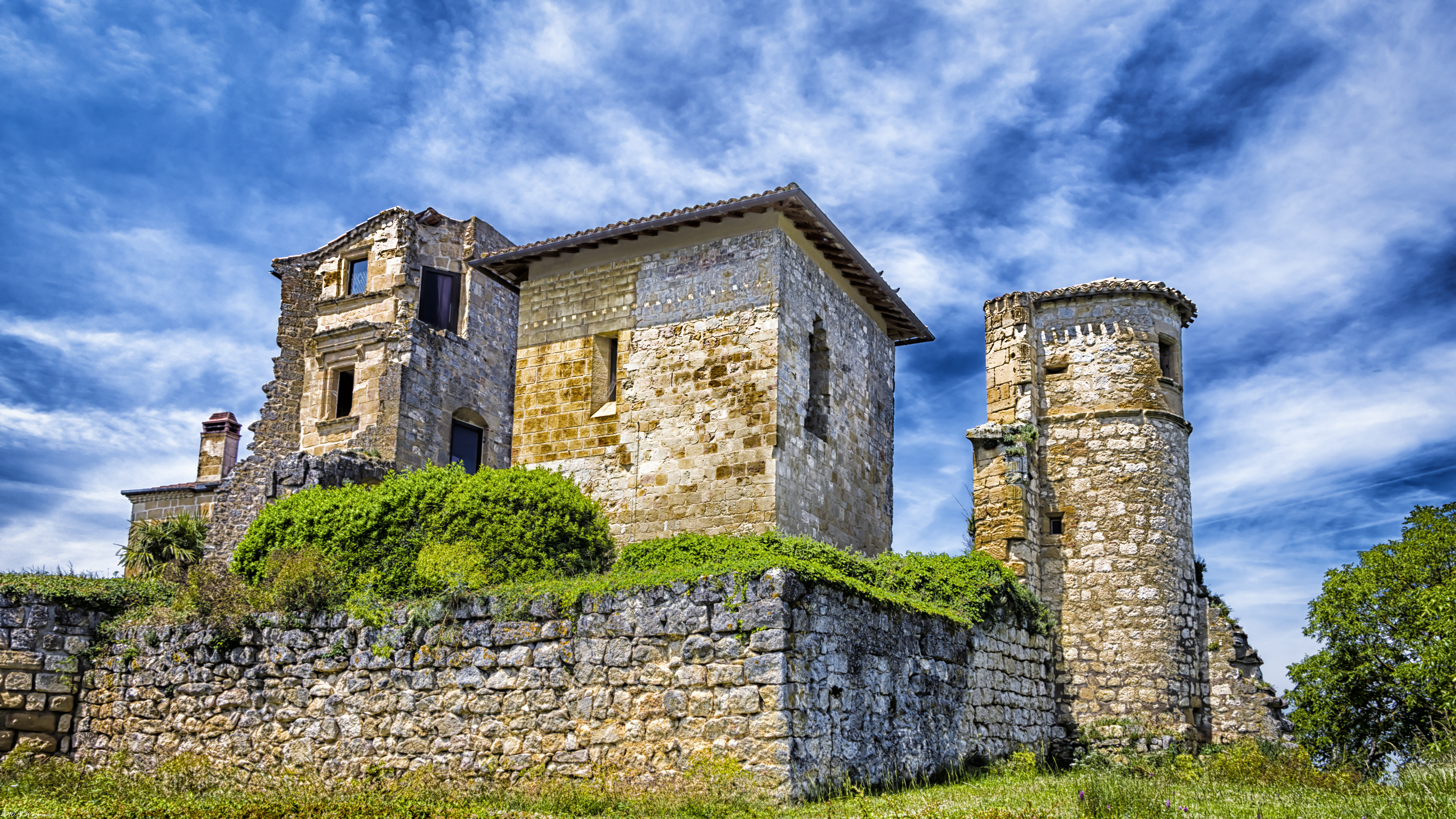
Château de Magrin in June 2016

The Château de Magrin is French château established in the commune of Magrin in the Tarn region, Occitanie. It houses a museum dedicated to pastel. It was partly classified as a historical monument in 14 December 1979.

The location of the Château de Magrin in France.

== History ==
Built on a height of 330 meters overlooking the valley of the Agout and hillsides of Lauragais, the site may have been occupied by a Gallic oppidum, converted into Roman castrum, and then reworked by the Visigoths.

The first written record of the château dates from 7 August 1224, when the chatelain put himself under the protection of the Count of Toulouse, Raymond VII. In 1279, a notarial act attributed his property to the Brenguier family of Puylaurens. During the Hundred Years War, a gang of bandits used it as a base for their raiding raids in the surrounding area, and, in 1502, it belonged to the Corneilhan family. During the wars of religion, its occupants became Protestants, and were welcoming of Henry of Navarre, soon to be Henry IV, in 1585.

Written traces are rarer, but it is likely that it was sold as a national good during the Revolution. It was partially burned as some traces testify, then was consolidated, allowing him to maintain a state of conservation.

In 1971, it was bought by a Mr. Rufino, the current owner who restored it in its entirety.

== Pastel Museum ==
A vaulted room contains period documents, fabrics dyed with blue pastel, and old tools for the craft. There's a dryer that could hold up to 100,000 pastel balls called cocagne.

In the attic with apparent period framing, a projection room broadcasts a film about the history of the castle and pastel culture
