= Château de Montcuq =

- Montcuq, Lot, France
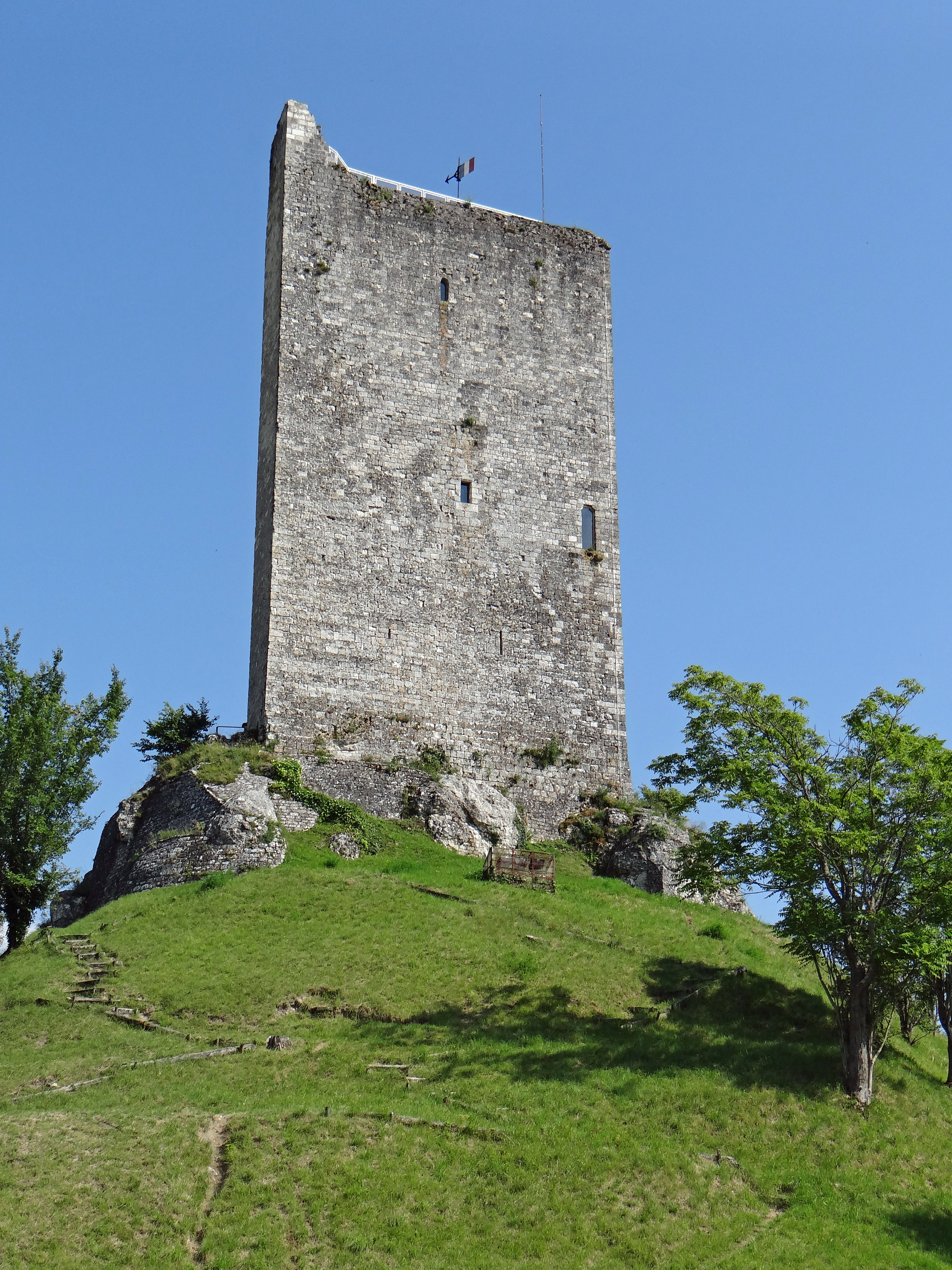
- Tower of Montcuq in 2013.

Location
- Coordinates: 44°20′N 1°13′E

Château de Montcuq is a ruined castle in Montcuq, Lot, France.

The castle of Montcuq was originally a Cathar stronghold and was captured by Simon de Montfort on 1 June 1212, after it had been deserted by its defenders. The castle was granted to the Crusader Beaudouin, half-brother of Cathar Raymond, Count of Toulouse. Beaudouin was arrested by Ratier de Castelnau on 17 February 1214 and after a period of captivity, was taken to Montauban and hanged at his brother's command.

After the Treaty of Meaux in 1229, the French rebuilt the walls of both the town and castle. The castle was retaken several times by the English and French during the Hundred Years' War and in the 16th century was plundered by the Huguenots. Only the tower keep of the castle remains.
