= Maignaut-Tauzia =

- Commune
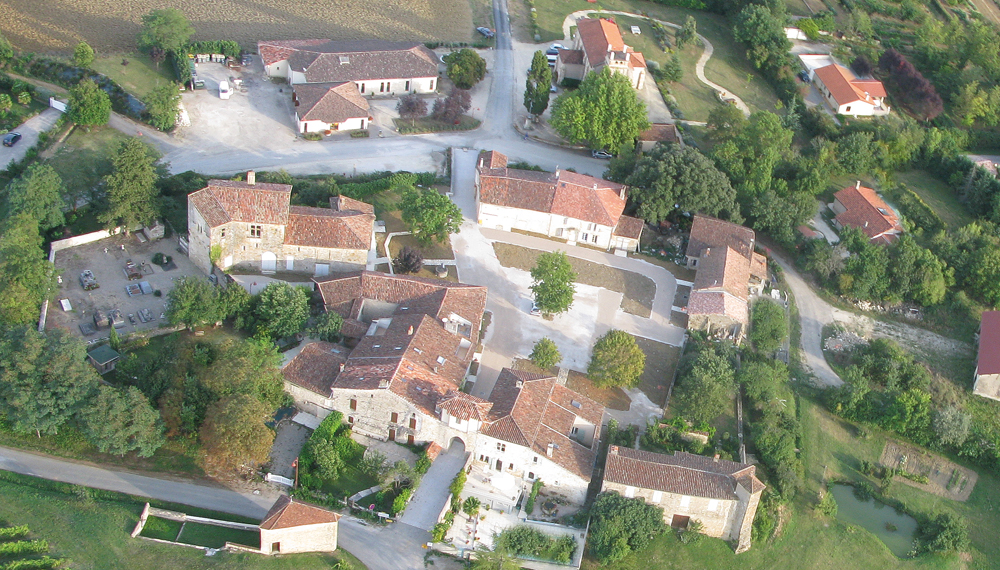
- A general view of Maignaut
- Location of Maignaut-Tauzia
- Location within France Location within Occitanie
- Coordinates: 43°53′26″N 0°24′26″E
- Country: France
- Region: Occitania
- Department: Gers
- Arrondissement: Condom
- Canton: Baïse-Armagnac

Government
  - Mayor (2020–2026): Sandrine Redolfi de Zan
- Area^{1}: 11.14 km^{2} (4.30 sq mi)
- Elevation: 150 m (490 ft)
- Highest elevation: 193 m (633 ft)
- Lowest elevation: 75 m (246 ft)
- Population (2023): 220
  - Density: 20/km^{2} (51/sq mi)
- Time zone: UTC+01:00 (CET)
  - Summer (DST): UTC+02:00 (CEST)
- INSEE/Postal code: 32224 /32310
- ^{1} French Land Register data, which excludes lakes, ponds, glaciers > 1 km^{2} (0.386 sq mi or 247 acres) and river estuaries.

Maignaut-Tauzia (French pronunciation: [mɛɲo tozja]; Gascon: Manhaut e Tausiar) is a commune in the Gers department in southwestern France.

== Geography ==
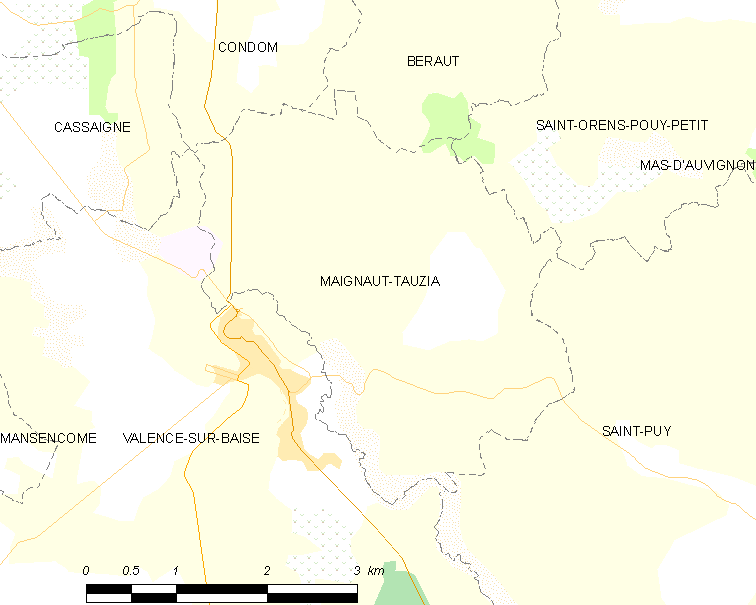
Maignaut-Tauzia and its surrounding communes

== Population ==
Historical population
Year	Pop.	±% p.a.
1968	169	—
1975	142	−2.46%
1982	142	+0.00%
1990	195	+4.04%
1999	181	−0.82%
2007	215	+2.18%
2012	231	+1.45%
2017	260	+2.39%
2023	220	−2.75%
Source: INSEE

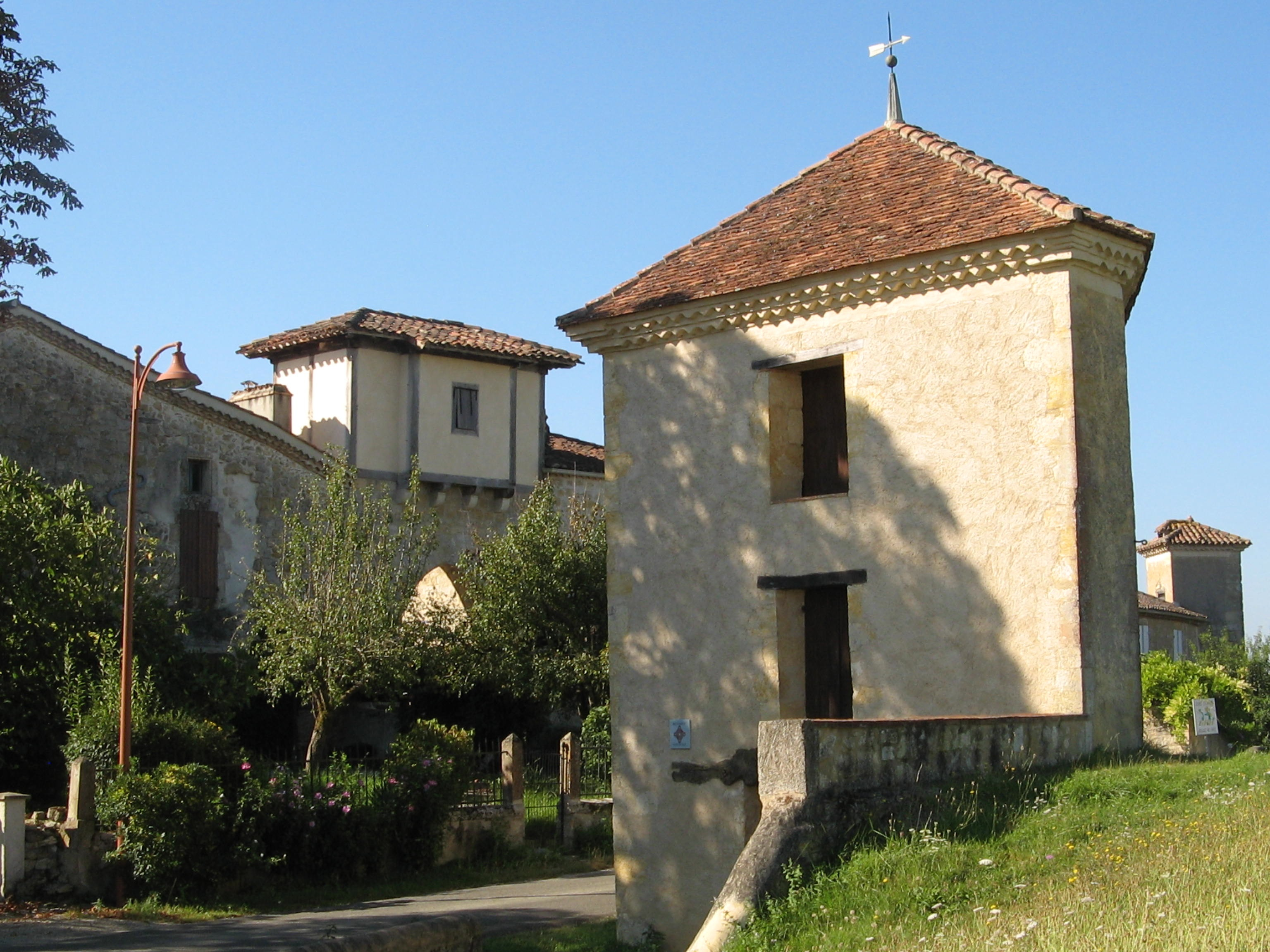
Dovecote and town gate

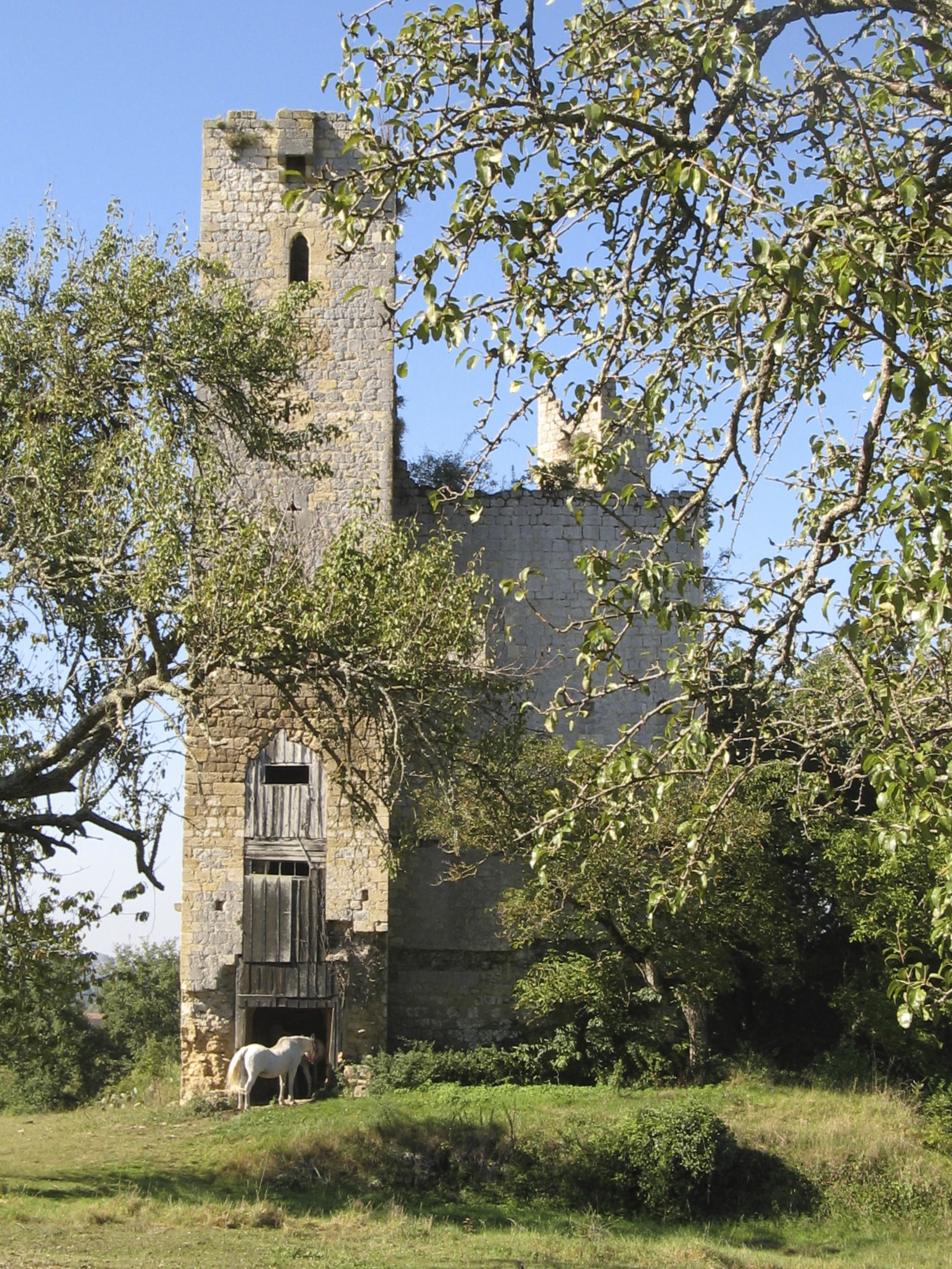
Château du Tauzia

== See also ==
- Communes of the Gers department
