= Gagnac-sur-Garonne =

- Commune
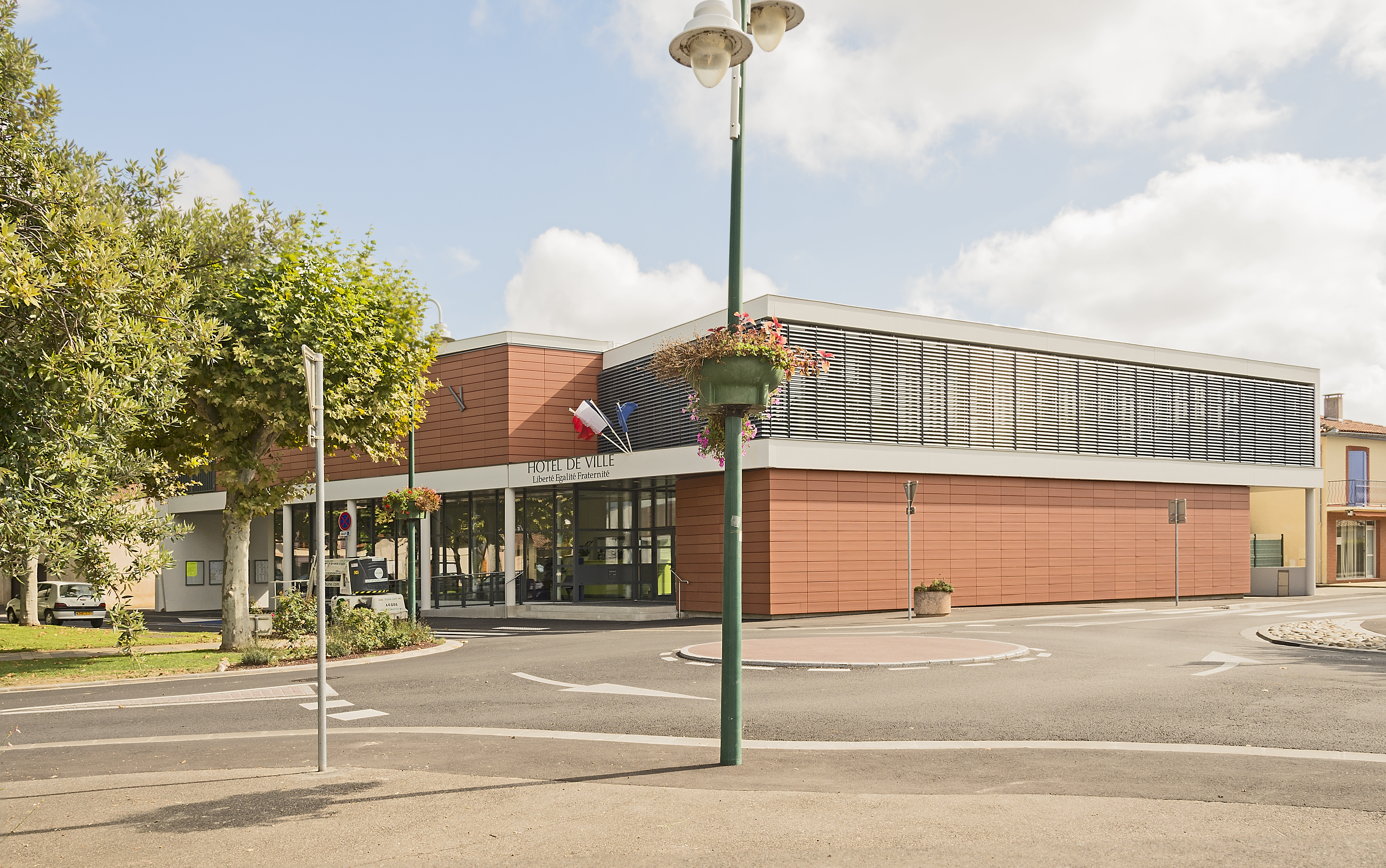
- Town hall

- Coat of arms
- Location of Gagnac-sur-Garonne
- Location within France Location within Occitanie
- Coordinates: 43°41′59″N 1°22′35″E
- Country: France
- Region: Occitania
- Department: Haute-Garonne
- Arrondissement: Toulouse
- Canton: Castelginest
- Intercommunality: Toulouse Métropole

Government
  - Mayor (2020–2026): Michel Simon
- Area^{1}: 4.34 km^{2} (1.68 sq mi)
- Elevation: 103 m (338 ft)
- Highest elevation: 123 m (404 ft)
- Lowest elevation: 113 m (371 ft)
- Population (2023): 3,198
  - Density: 737/km^{2} (1,910/sq mi)
- Time zone: UTC+01:00 (CET)
  - Summer (DST): UTC+02:00 (CEST)
- INSEE/Postal code: 31205 /31150
- ^{1} French Land Register data, which excludes lakes, ponds, glaciers > 1 km^{2} (0.386 sq mi or 247 acres) and river estuaries.

Gagnac-sur-Garonne (French pronunciation: [ɡaɲak syʁ ɡaʁɔn], literally Gagnac on Garonne; Occitan: Ganhac de Garona) is a commune in the Haute-Garonne department in southwestern France.

== Population ==
Historical population
Year	Pop.	±% p.a.
1968	557	—
1975	813	+5.55%
1982	1,015	+3.22%
1990	1,324	+3.38%
1999	1,635	+2.37%
2007	2,727	+6.60%
2012	2,949	+1.58%
2017	3,110	+1.07%
2023	3,198	+0.47%
Source: INSEE

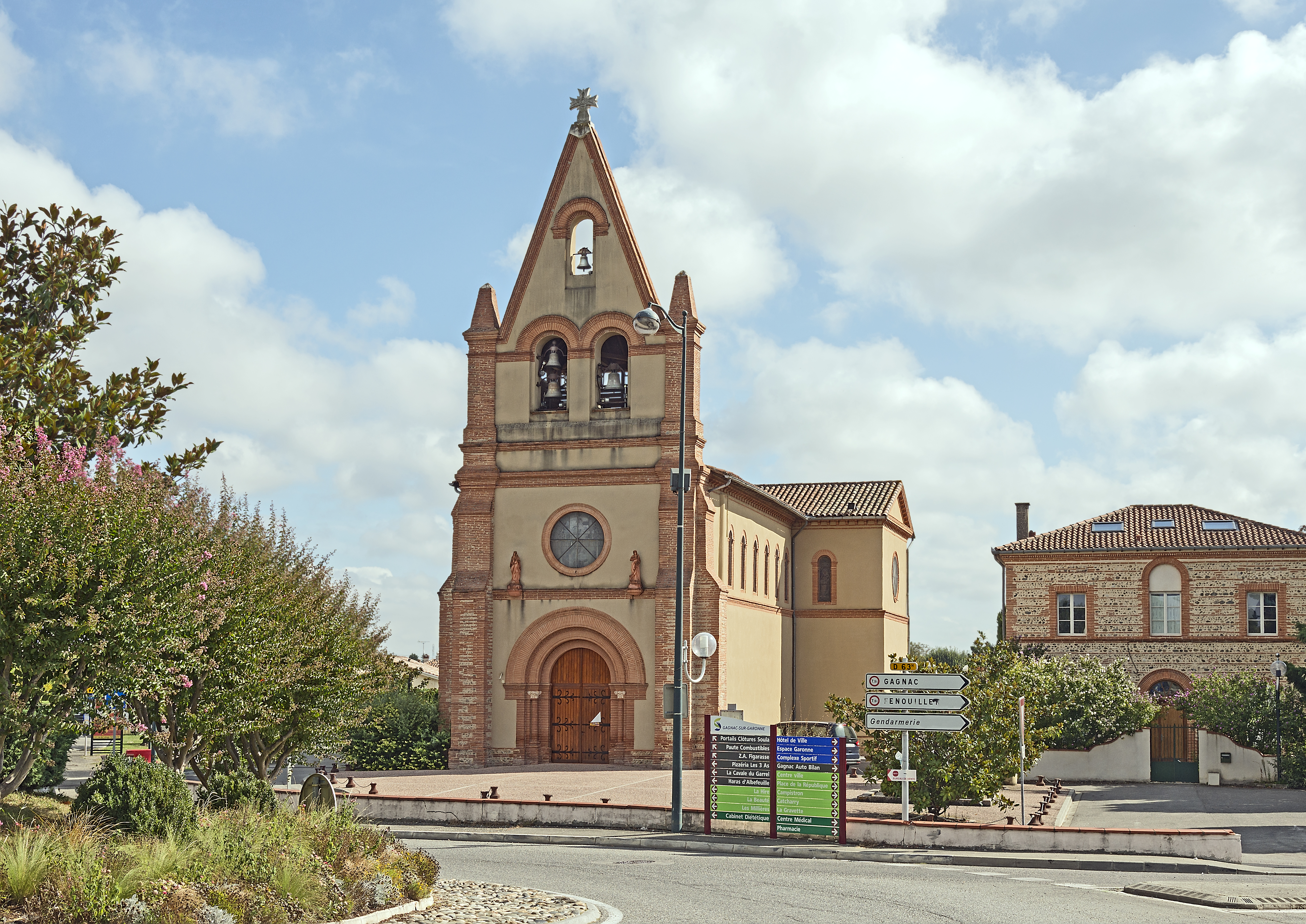
The church

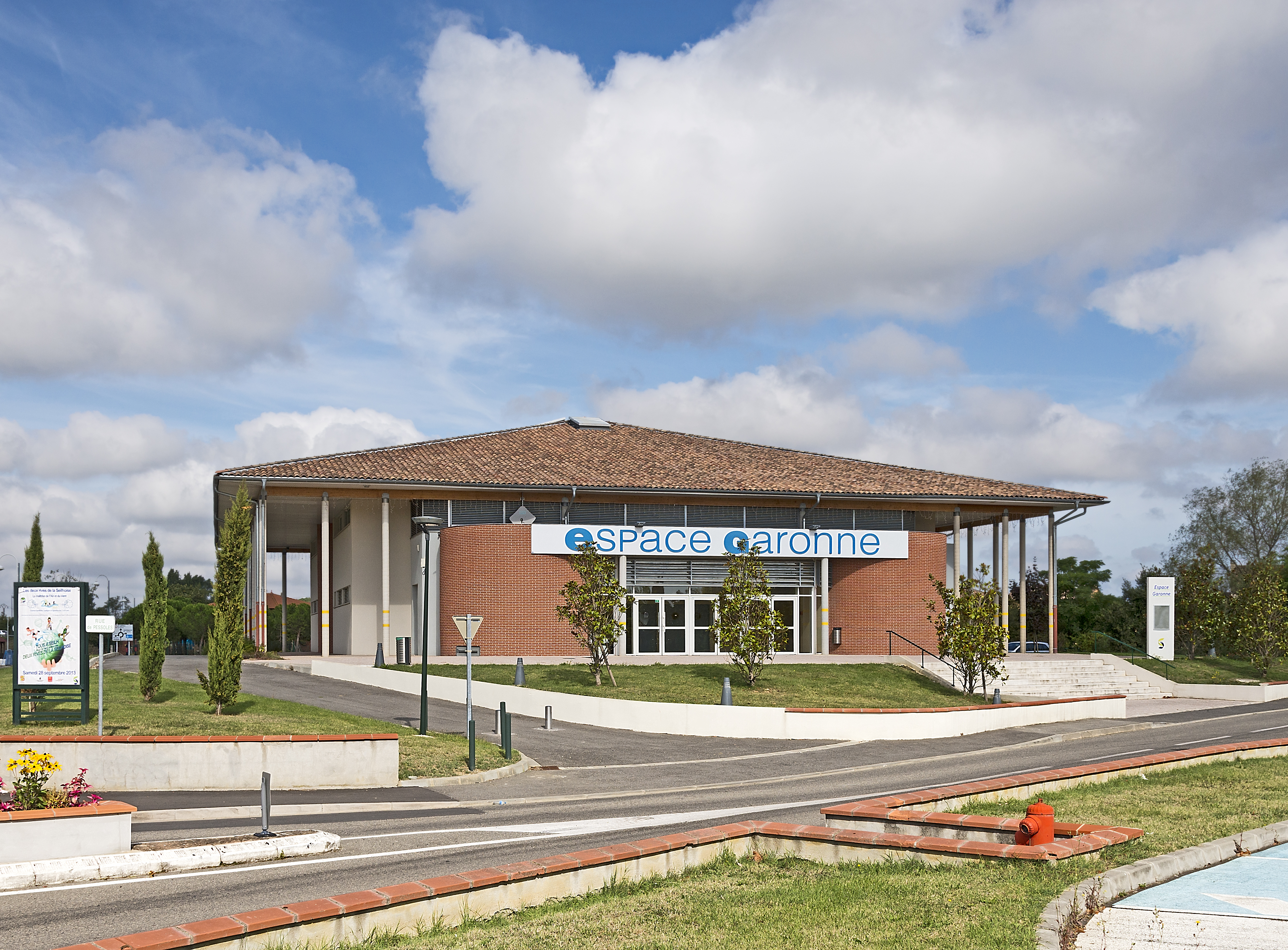
Community centre

== See also ==
- Communes of the Haute-Garonne department
