= Pergain-Taillac =

- Commune
- Coat of arms
- Location of Pergain-Taillac
- Location within France Location within Occitanie
- Coordinates: 44°03′34″N 0°35′19″E
- Country: France
- Region: Occitania
- Department: Gers
- Arrondissement: Condom
- Canton: Lectoure-Lomagne

Government
  - Mayor (2020–2026): Chantal Dubedat
- Area^{1}: 19.38 km^{2} (7.48 sq mi)
- Elevation: 151 m (495 ft)
- Highest elevation: 187 m (614 ft)
- Lowest elevation: 57 m (187 ft)
- Population (2023): 336
  - Density: 17.3/km^{2} (44.9/sq mi)
- Time zone: UTC+01:00 (CET)
  - Summer (DST): UTC+02:00 (CEST)
- INSEE/Postal code: 32311 /32700
- ^{1} French Land Register data, which excludes lakes, ponds, glaciers > 1 km^{2} (0.386 sq mi or 247 acres) and river estuaries.

Pergain-Taillac (French pronunciation: [pɛʁgɛ̃ tajak]; gascon Lo Perganh e Talhac Occitan pronunciation: [lu pɛrgan e tajak]) is a commune in the Gers department in southwestern France. The communes of Pergain/Le Pergain and Taillac were merged in 1822, and the seat of the commune was set at Le Pergain.

== Geography ==
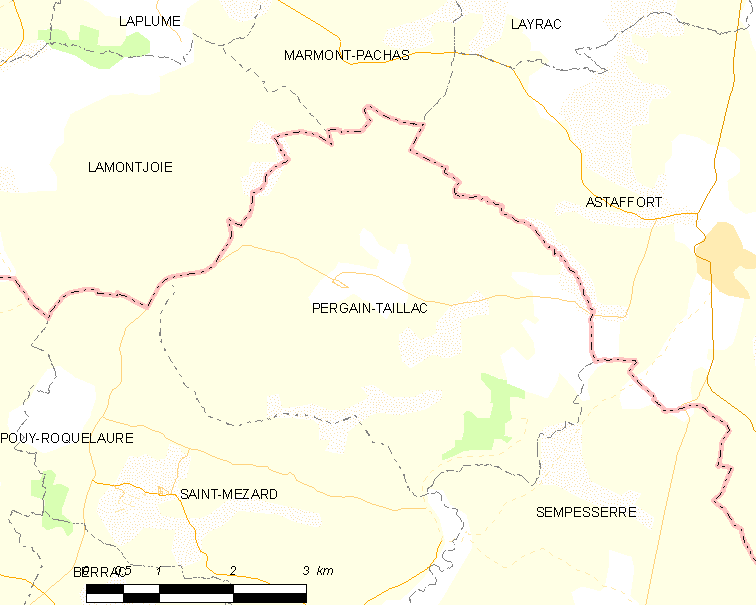
Pergain-Taillac and its surrounding communes

== Population ==
Historical population
Year	Pop.	±% p.a.
1968	383	—
1975	307	−3.11%
1982	270	−1.82%
1990	283	+0.59%
1999	286	+0.12%
2007	310	+1.01%
2012	336	+1.62%
2017	302	−2.11%
2023	336	+1.79%
Source: INSEE

== See also ==
- Communes of the Gers department
