= Château de Latour =

Castle in France

Coordinates: 43.8725°N 3.0304°E

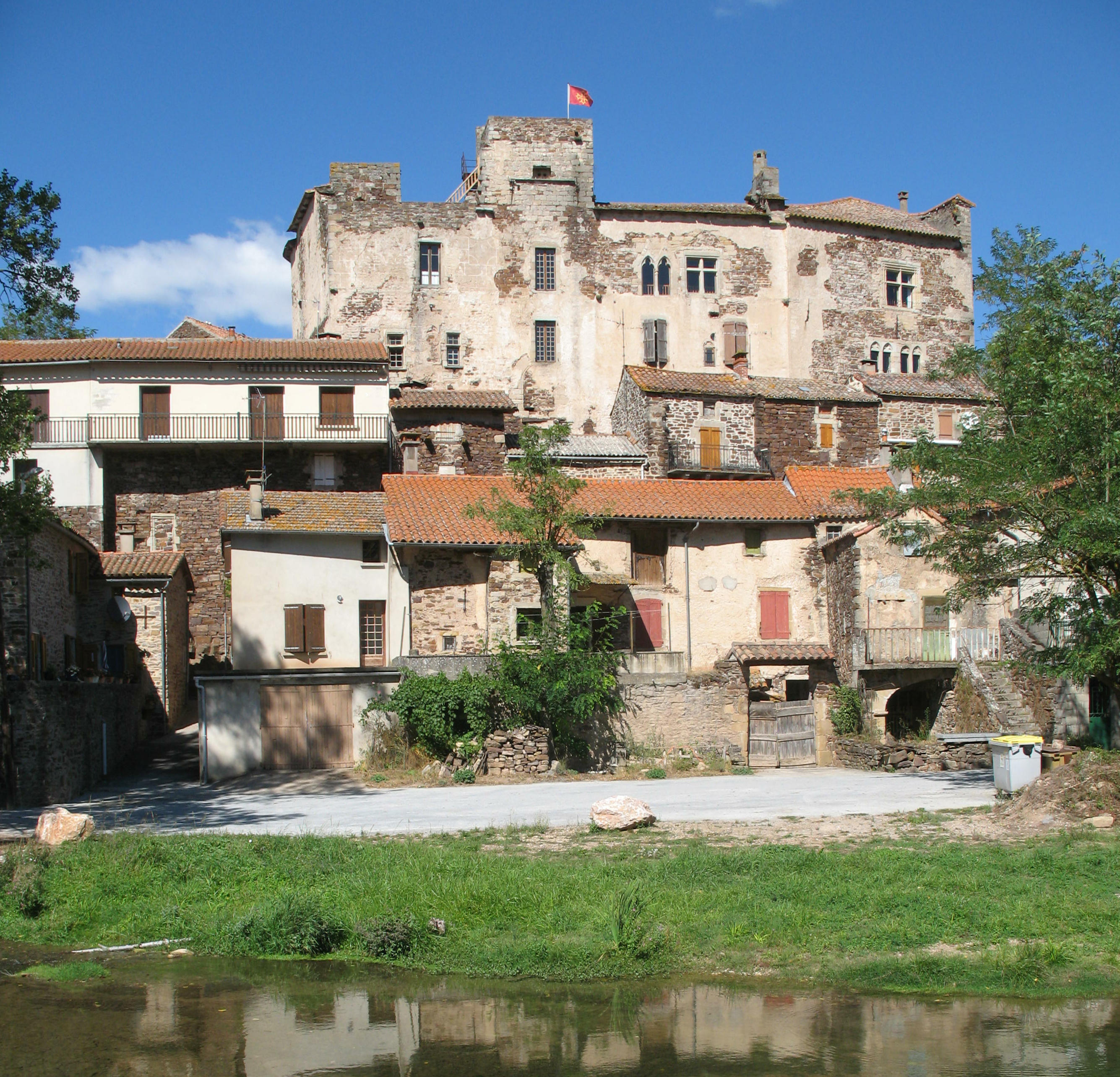
Château de Latour

The Château de Latour, or Château de Latour-sur-Sorgues, is a castle in the village of Latour-sur-Sourges in the commune of Marnhagues-et-Latour in the Aveyron département of France.

== Location ==
The castle stands on a rocky promontory overlooking the Sorgues river.

== History ==
Although its origins are much older, the present castle dates from the 15th century. It has been owned by three families, Latour, Roquefeuil and Bonald.

== Description ==
The castle comprises two residential buildings in the south and east arranged in an L-shape, linked at the extremities in a curve.

It includes a keep, chemin de ronde, polygonal échaugettes and twin arcaded windows. Inside is a 16th century painted ceiling and a reconstruction of a cloistered nun's cell.

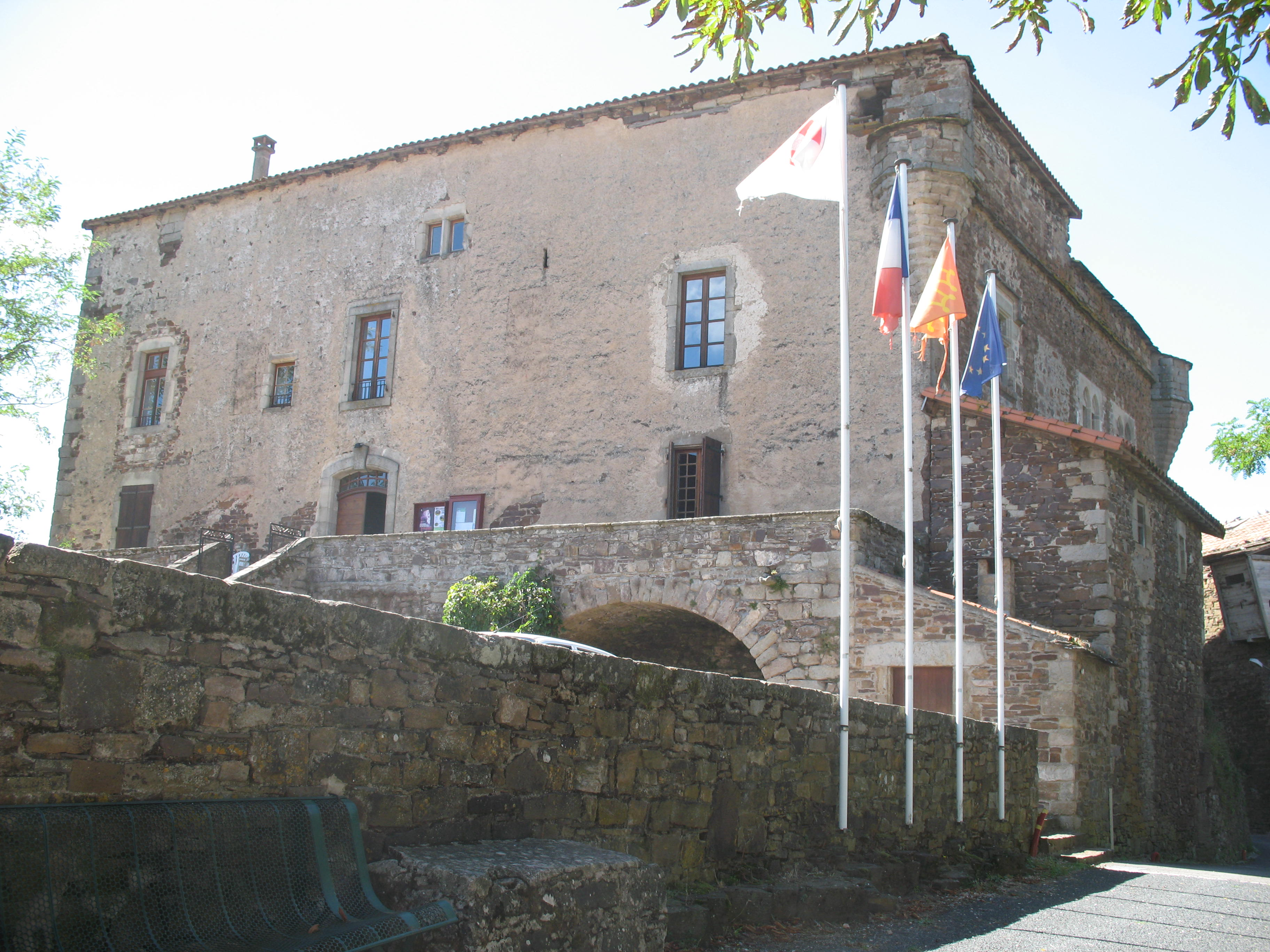
East side

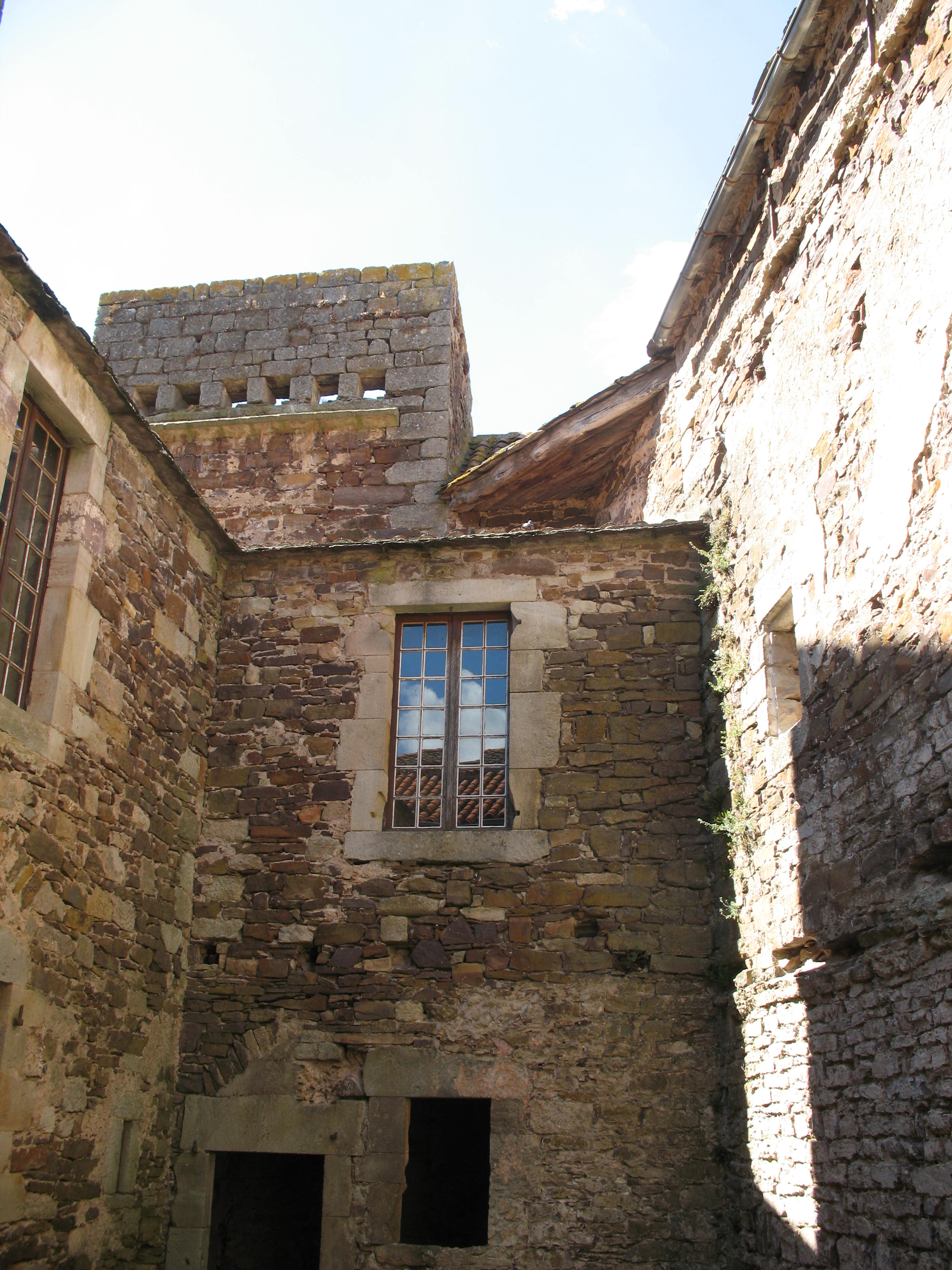
Interior court

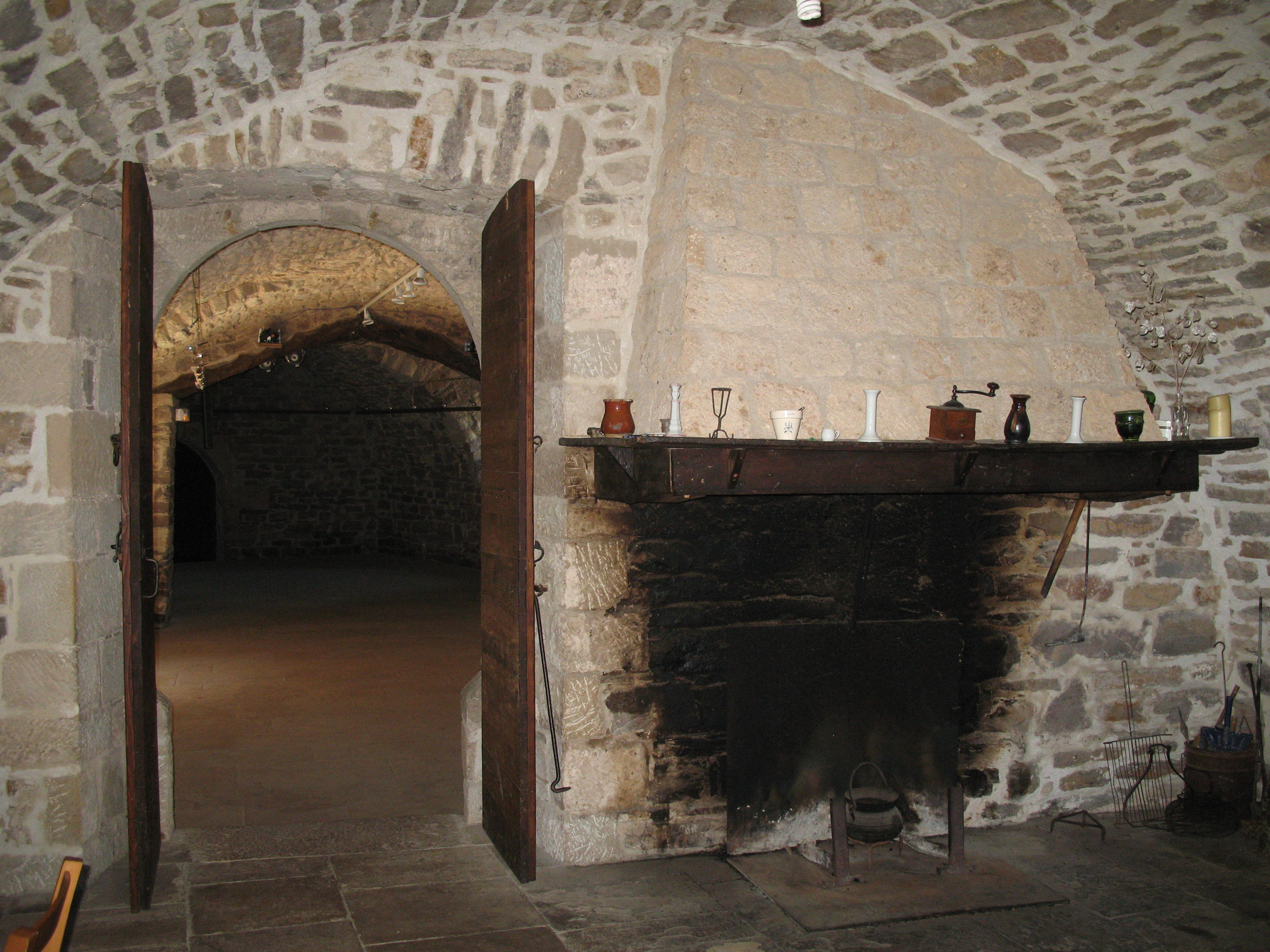
Kitchen

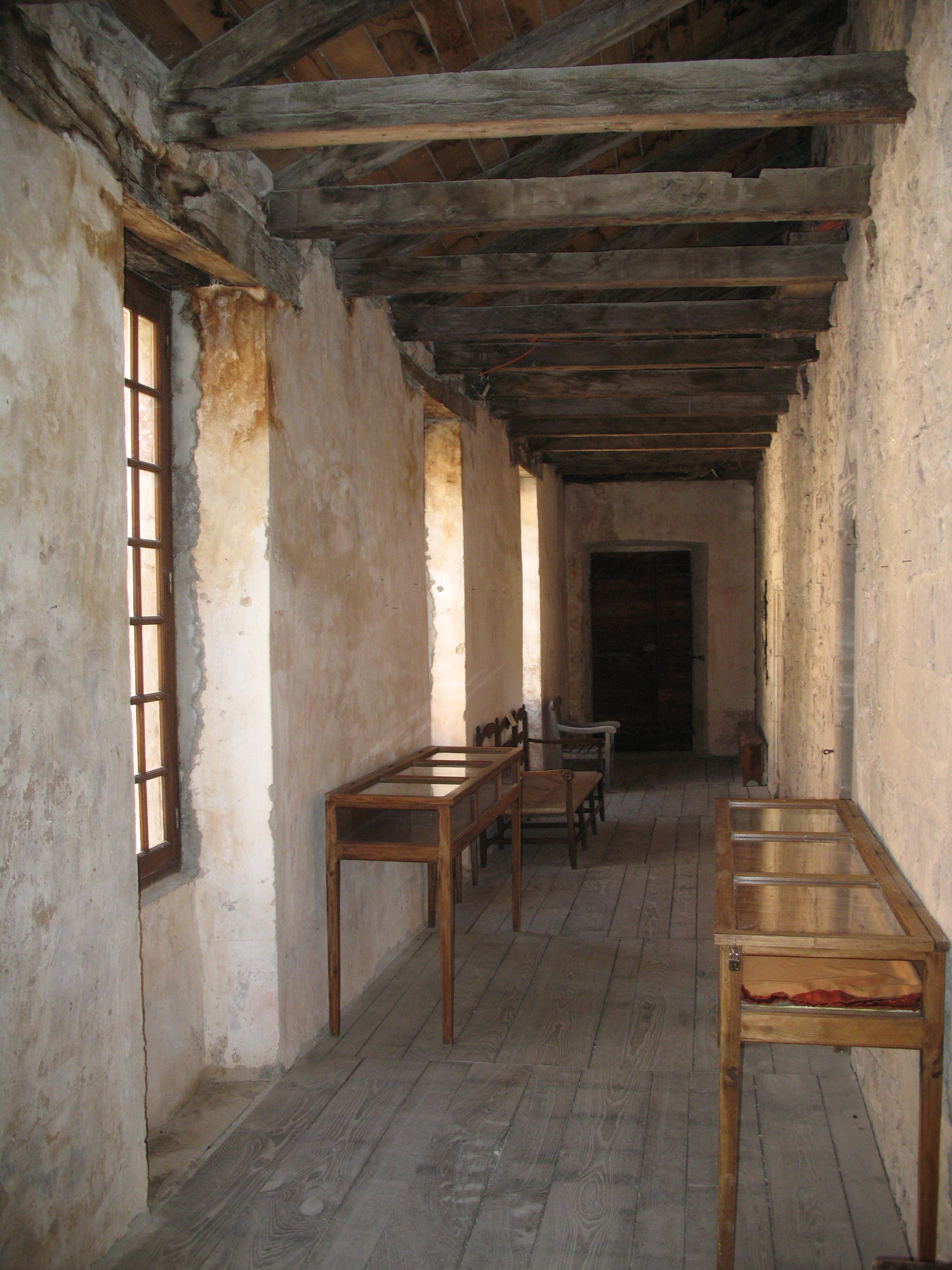
Passage

Since 1991, the castle has belonged to the commune. Activities and visits are organised by the Association des Amis du château de Latour (Association of friends of the Château de Latour), which has undertaken its restoration. Some rooms have been converted for use as a gîte.

== See also ==
- List of castles in France
