= Brousse-le-Château =

Commune in Occitanie, France

Brousse-le-Château Brossa (Occitan)
- Commune
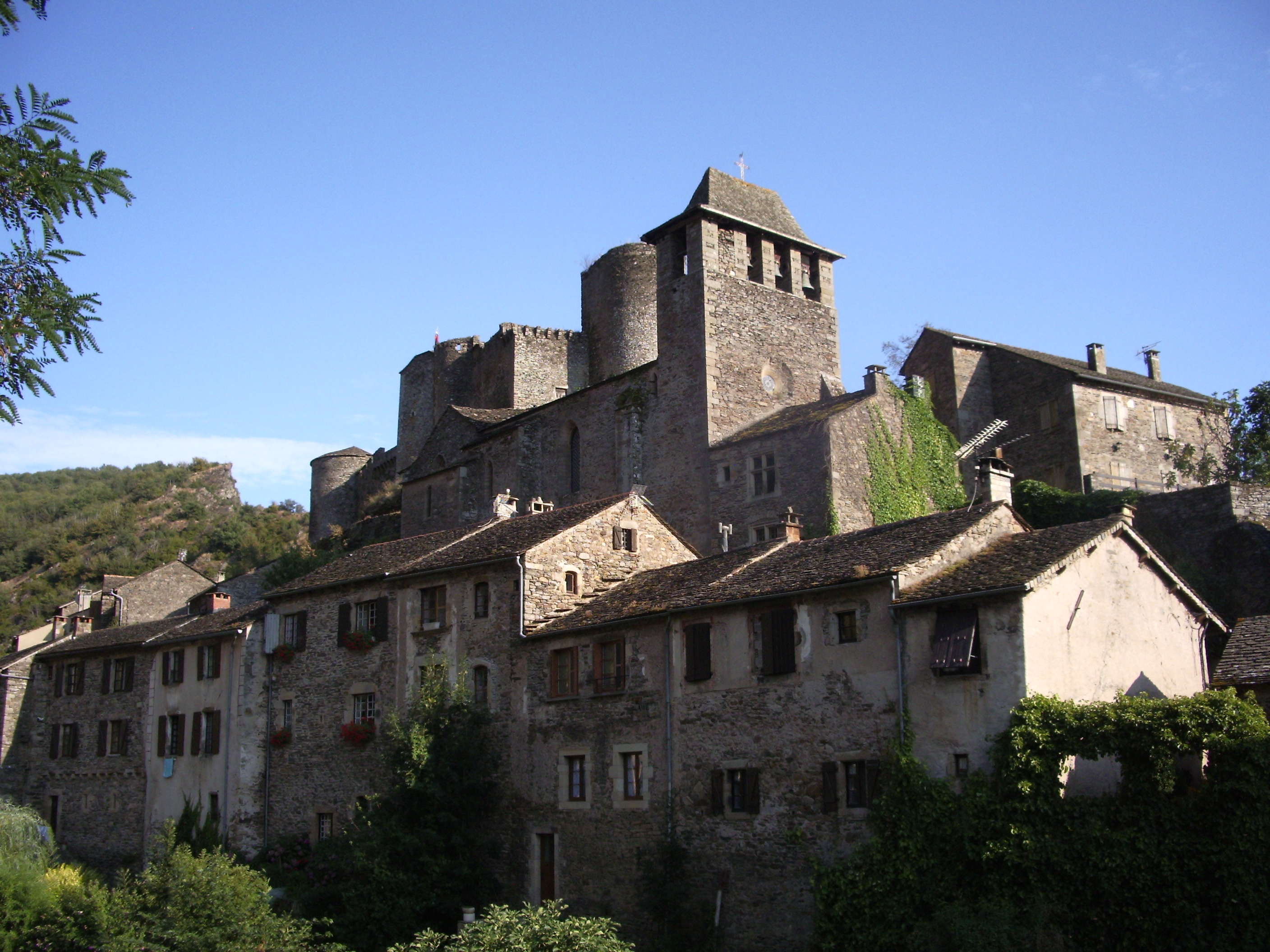
- The castle and church in Brousse-le-château
- Location of Brousse-le-Château
- Location within France Location within Occitanie
- Coordinates: 43°59′54″N 2°37′33″E
- Country: France
- Region: Occitania
- Department: Aveyron
- Arrondissement: Millau
- Canton: Raspes et Lévezou

Government
  - Mayor (2020–2026): Georget Damerval
- Area^{1}: 15.54 km^{2} (6.00 sq mi)
- Elevation: 229 m (751 ft)
- Highest elevation: 665 m (2,182 ft)
- Lowest elevation: 220 m (720 ft)
- Population (2023): 164
  - Density: 10.6/km^{2} (27.3/sq mi)
- Time zone: UTC+01:00 (CET)
  - Summer (DST): UTC+02:00 (CEST)
- INSEE/Postal code: 12038 /12480
- ^{1} French Land Register data, which excludes lakes, ponds, glaciers > 1 km^{2} (0.386 sq mi or 247 acres) and river estuaries.

Brousse-le-Château (French: [bʁus lə ʃɑto]; Occitan: Brossa lo Castèl) is a commune in the Aveyron department in southern France. It is a member of Les Plus Beaux Villages de France (The Most Beautiful Villages of France) Association.

== Population ==
Historical population
Year	Pop.	±% p.a.
1968	268	—
1975	219	−2.84%
1982	225	+0.39%
1990	203	−1.28%
1999	163	−2.41%
2007	171	+0.60%
2012	151	−2.46%
2017	158	+0.91%
2023	164	+0.62%
Source: INSEE

== See also ==
- Communes of the Aveyron department
