= Château de Fourquevaux =

Castle in Occitania, France

Coordinates: 43°30′19″N 1°37′10″E

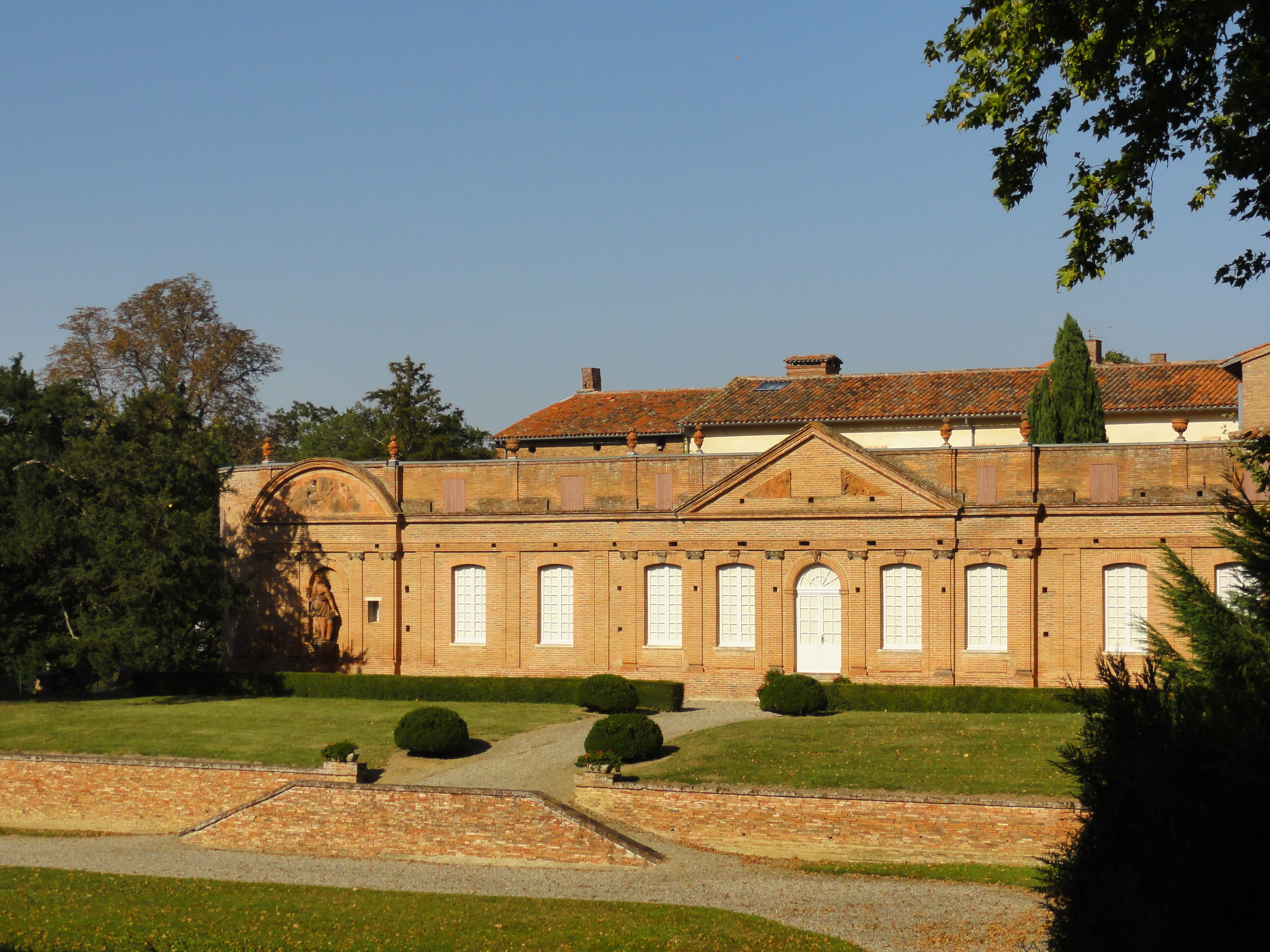
Castle of Fourquevaux, Haute-Garonne, France.

The Château de Fourquevaux was originally a 15th-century castle in the commune of Fourquevaux in the Haute-Garonne département of France. It was modified in the 16th century. An orangery was added in the last quarter of the 18th century.

Privately owned, it has been listed since 1979 as a monument historique by the French Ministry of Culture.

== See also ==
- List of castles in France
