= Château de Larroque =

Castle keep ruins in Haute-Garonne, France

Coordinates: 43°11′35″N 0°36′34″E

The Château de Larroque is the remains of a 12th-century castle keep in the commune of Larroque in the Haute-Garonne département of France.

The property of the commune, it has been listed since 1930 as a monument historique by the French Ministry of Culture.

== See also ==
- List of castles in France
