= Moularès =

- Commune
- Coat of arms
- Location of Moularès
- Location within France Location within Occitanie
- Coordinates: 44°04′20″N 2°17′38″E
- Country: France
- Region: Occitania
- Department: Tarn
- Arrondissement: Albi
- Canton: Carmaux-1 Le Ségala

Government
  - Mayor (2020–2026): Christian Puech
- Area^{1}: 16.81 km^{2} (6.49 sq mi)
- Elevation: 440 m (1,440 ft)
- Highest elevation: 593 m (1,946 ft)
- Lowest elevation: 315 m (1,033 ft)
- Population (2023): 257
  - Density: 15.3/km^{2} (39.6/sq mi)
- Time zone: UTC+01:00 (CET)
  - Summer (DST): UTC+02:00 (CEST)
- INSEE/Postal code: 81186 /81190
- ^{1} French Land Register data, which excludes lakes, ponds, glaciers > 1 km^{2} (0.386 sq mi or 247 acres) and river estuaries.

Moularès (French pronunciation: [mulaʁɛs]; Occitan: Molarés) is a commune in the Tarn department in southern France.

== See also ==
- Communes of the Tarn department
