= Villecomtal =

Commune in Occitanie, France

- Commune
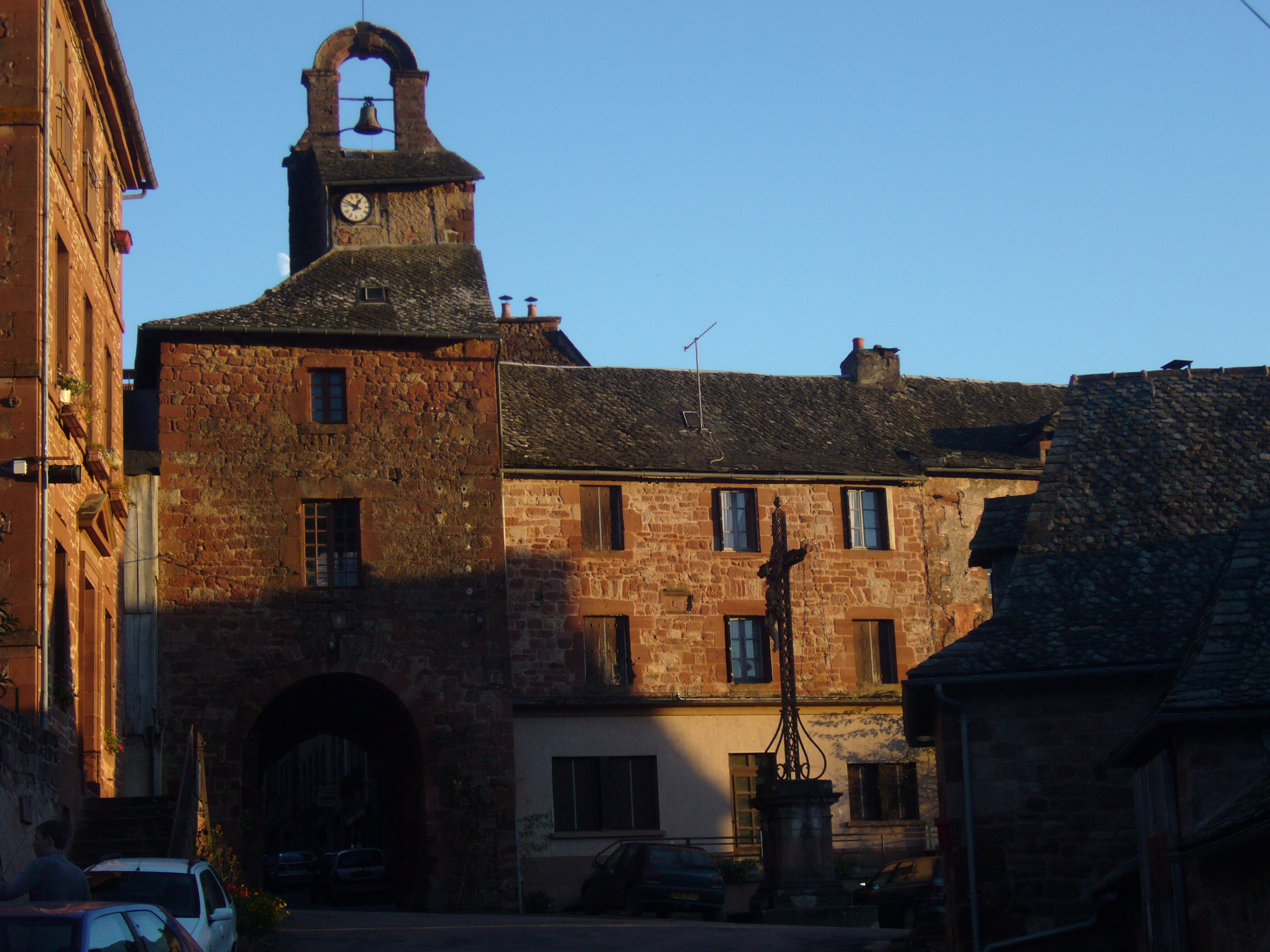
- The main gate
- Location of Villecomtal
- Location within France Location within Occitanie
- Coordinates: 44°32′23″N 2°33′56″E
- Country: France
- Region: Occitania
- Department: Aveyron
- Arrondissement: Rodez
- Canton: Lot et Truyère

Government
  - Mayor (2020–2026): Patrice Philoreau
- Area^{1}: 14.05 km^{2} (5.42 sq mi)
- Elevation: 300 m (980 ft)
- Highest elevation: 654 m (2,146 ft)
- Lowest elevation: 296 m (971 ft)
- Population (2023): 430
  - Density: 31/km^{2} (79/sq mi)
- Time zone: UTC+01:00 (CET)
  - Summer (DST): UTC+02:00 (CEST)
- INSEE/Postal code: 12298 /12580
- ^{1} French Land Register data, which excludes lakes, ponds, glaciers > 1 km^{2} (0.386 sq mi or 247 acres) and river estuaries.

Villecomtal (French pronunciation: [vilkɔ̃tal]；Occitan: Vilacomtal) is a commune in the Aveyron department in southern France. It was founded circa 1295 by Henri II, count of Rodez.

== Population ==
Historical population
Year	Pop.	±% p.a.
1968	520	—
1975	468	−1.49%
1982	458	−0.31%
1990	418	−1.14%
1999	419	+0.03%
2007	438	+0.56%
2012	378	−2.90%
2017	403	+1.29%
2023	430	+1.09%
Source: INSEE

== See also ==
- Communes of the Aveyron department
