= Mansencôme =

- Commune
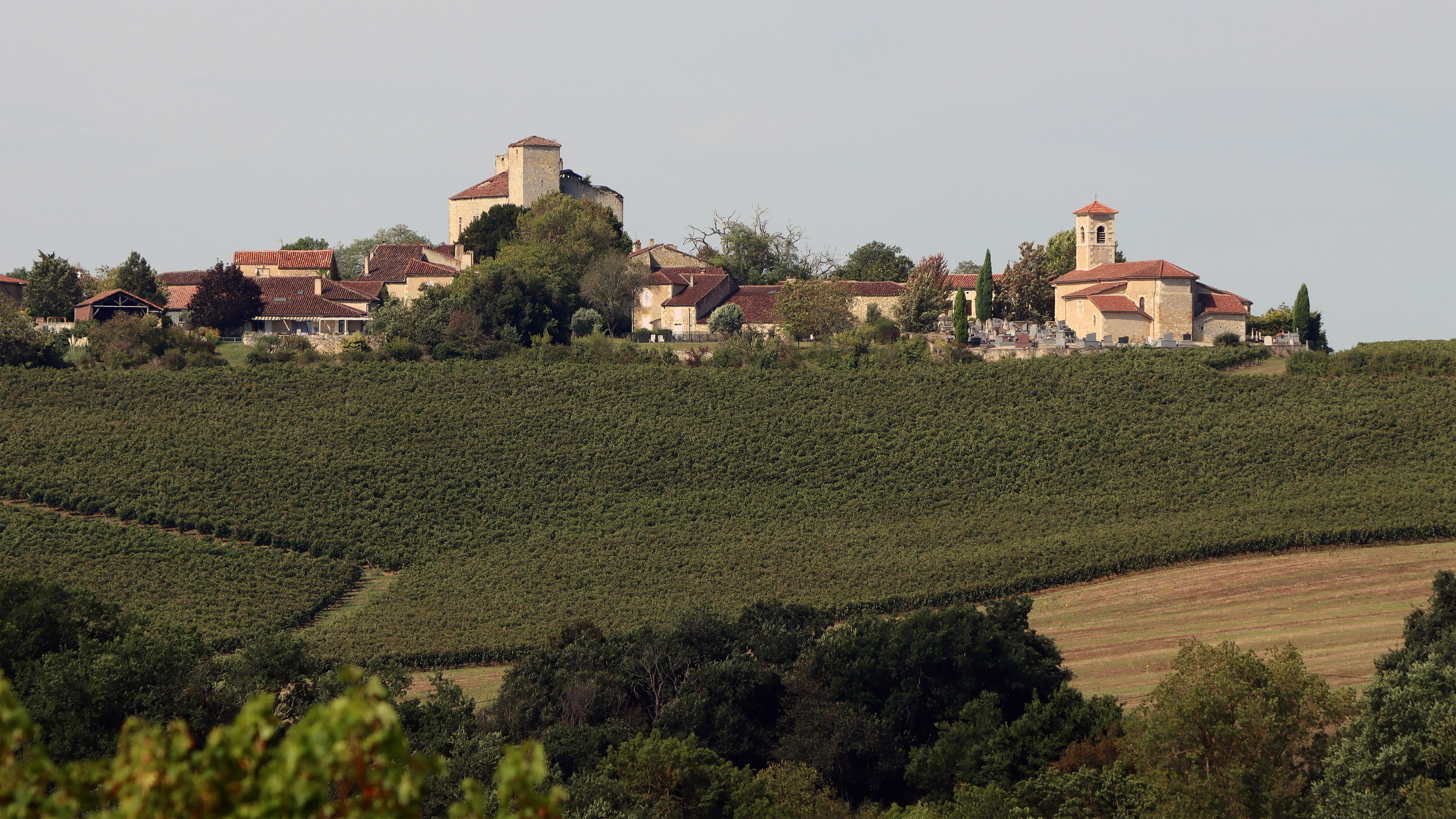
- Location of Mansencôme
- Location within France Location within Occitanie
- Coordinates: 43°52′20″N 0°20′26″E
- Country: France
- Region: Occitania
- Department: Gers
- Arrondissement: Condom
- Canton: Armagnac-Ténarèze
- Intercommunality: Ténarèze

Government
  - Mayor (2020–2026): Étienne Barrère
- Area^{1}: 4.05 km^{2} (1.56 sq mi)
- Elevation: 200 m (660 ft)
- Highest elevation: 201 m (659 ft)
- Lowest elevation: 112 m (367 ft)
- Population (2023): 45
  - Density: 11/km^{2} (29/sq mi)
- Time zone: UTC+01:00 (CET)
  - Summer (DST): UTC+02:00 (CEST)
- INSEE/Postal code: 32230 /32310
- ^{1} French Land Register data, which excludes lakes, ponds, glaciers > 1 km^{2} (0.386 sq mi or 247 acres) and river estuaries.

Mansencôme (French pronunciation: [mɑ̃sɛ̃kom]; Gascon: Massencoma) is a commune in the Gers department in southwestern France.

== Geography ==
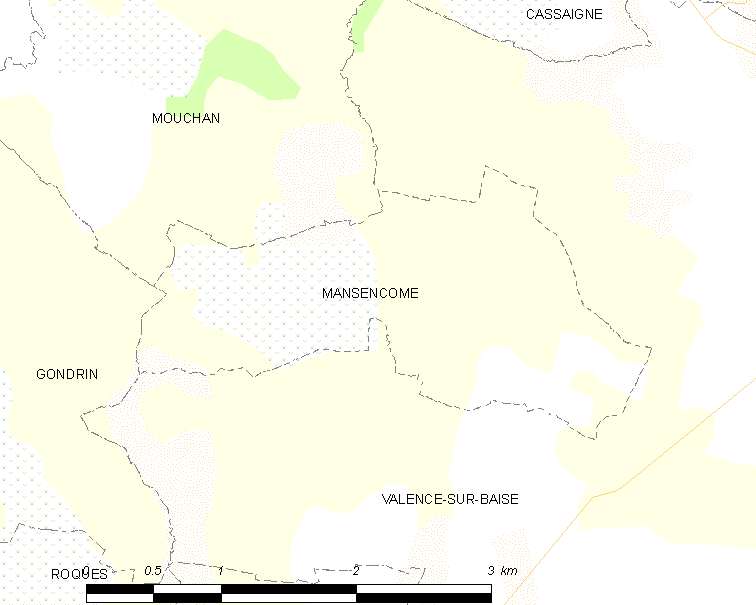
Mansencôme and its surrounding communes

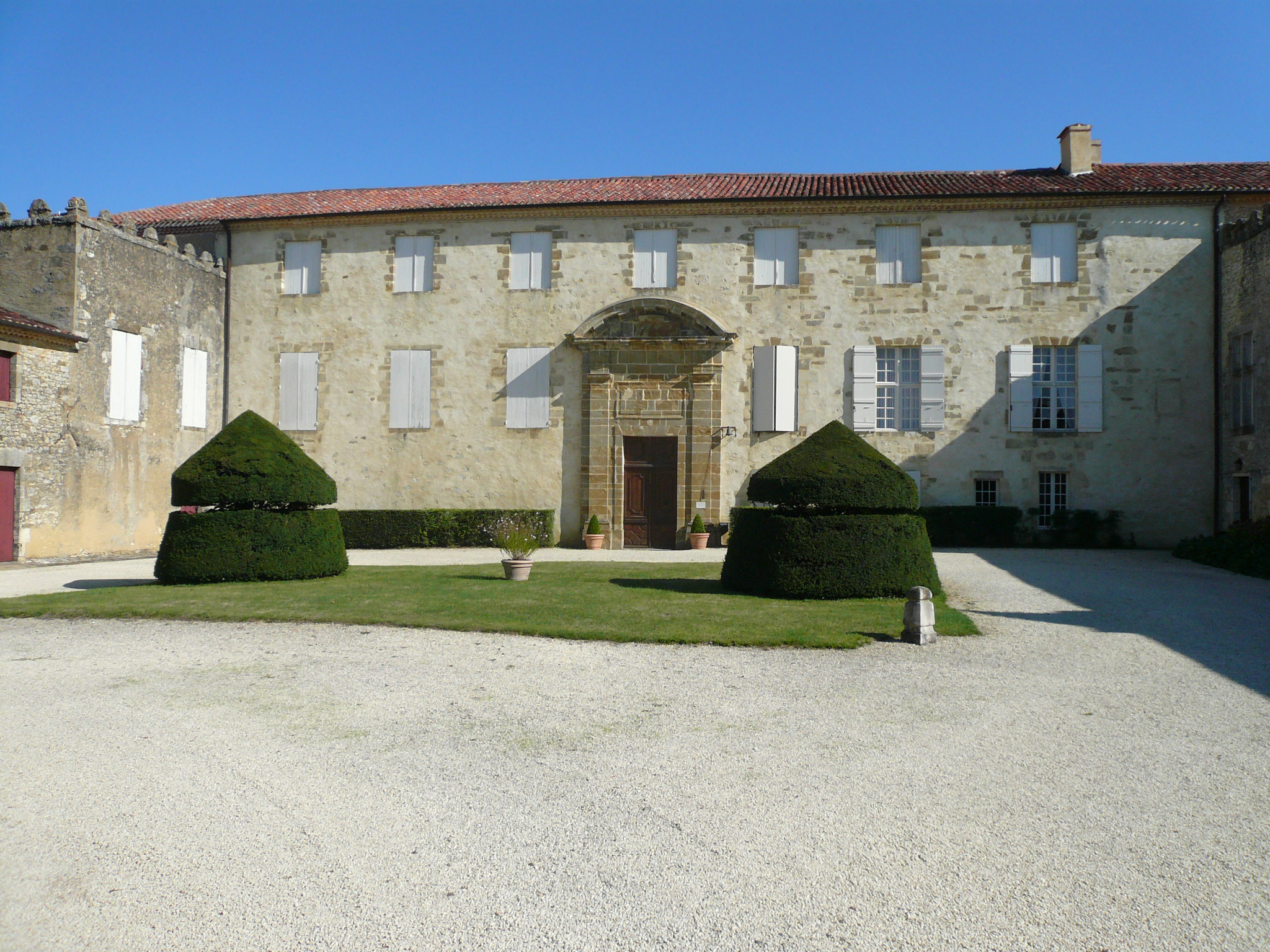
Château du Busca in Mansencôme

== Population ==
Historical population
Year	Pop.	±% p.a.
1968	93	—
1975	88	−0.79%
1982	71	−3.02%
1990	69	−0.36%
1999	73	+0.63%
2007	68	−0.88%
2012	53	−4.86%
2017	46	−2.79%
2023	45	−0.37%
Source: INSEE

== See also ==
- Communes of the Gers department
