= Magrin =

- Commune
- Coat of arms
- Location of Magrin
- Location within France Location within Occitanie
- Coordinates: 43°36′43″N 1°55′27″E
- Country: France
- Region: Occitania
- Department: Tarn
- Arrondissement: Castres
- Canton: Plaine de l'Agoût

Government
  - Mayor (2020–2026): Bernard Viala
- Area^{1}: 8.07 km^{2} (3.12 sq mi)
- Elevation: 320 m (1,050 ft)
- Highest elevation: 331 m (1,086 ft)
- Lowest elevation: 212 m (696 ft)
- Population (2023): 140
  - Density: 17/km^{2} (45/sq mi)
- Time zone: UTC+01:00 (CET)
  - Summer (DST): UTC+02:00 (CEST)
- INSEE/Postal code: 81151 /81220
- ^{1} French Land Register data, which excludes lakes, ponds, glaciers > 1 km^{2} (0.386 sq mi or 247 acres) and river estuaries.

Magrin (French pronunciation: [maɡʁɛ̃]; Occitan: Magrinh) is a commune in the Tarn department in southern France.

== See also ==
- Communes of the Tarn department
