= Pic de Nore transmitter =

Tower in France

Pic de Nore
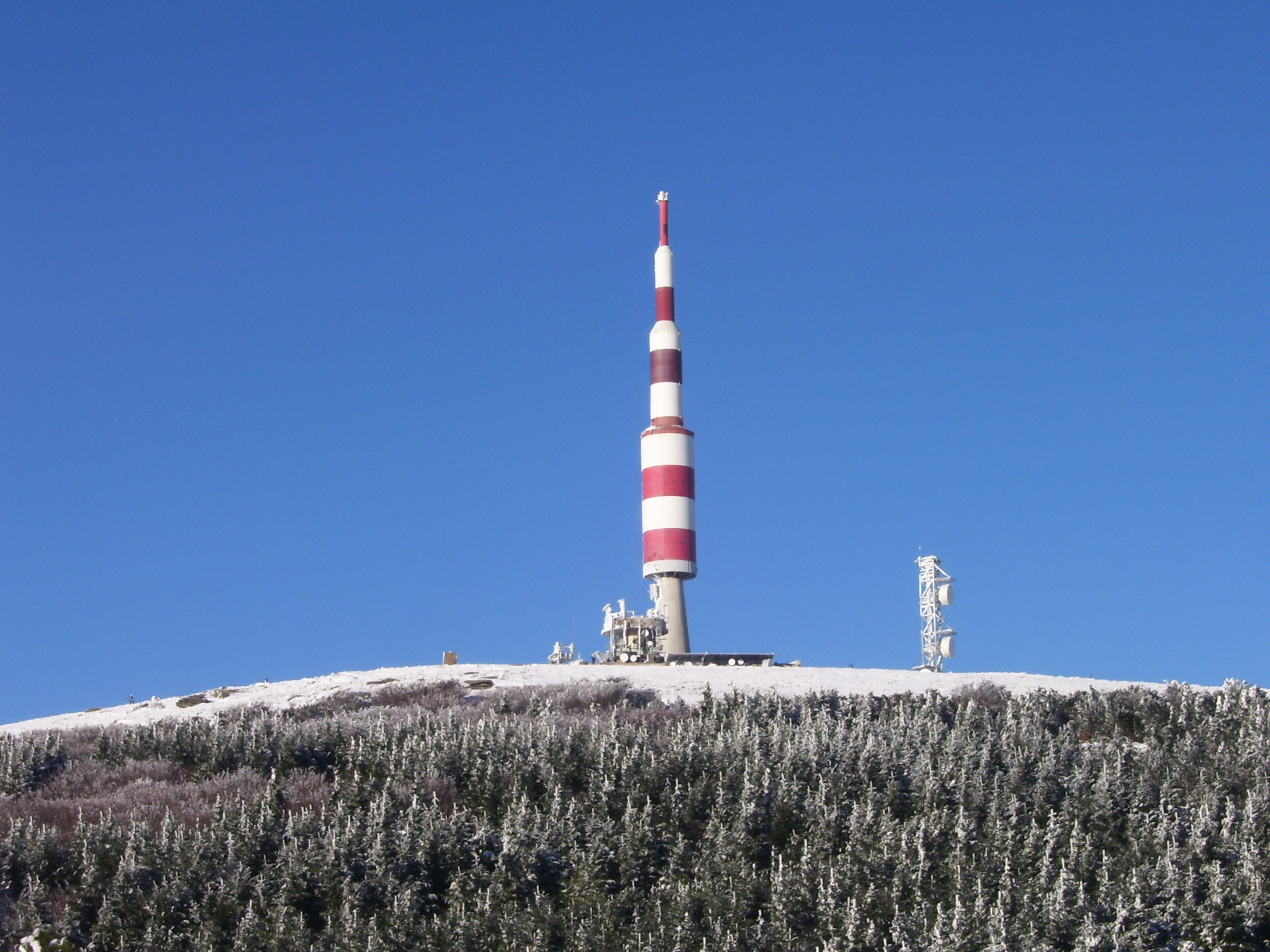

- Location within France
- Location: Pic de Nore
- Coordinates: 43.4249°N 2.46315°E

Pic de Nore transmitter is a facility for FM/TV transmission situated on the mountain of same name at 43°25'29"N 2°27'47"E, in the Montagne Noire, on the border of the Aude and Tarn departments, near to the Parc naturel régional du Haut-Languedoc in southern France.

It uses a 102 metres tall concrete tower. This tower replaces the old tower, which was situated on the roof of the transmitter building and whose pinnacle was torn down by a storm on December 2, 1976. The stump of the old tower still exists and is today used for mobile phone transmission.
