= Pic de Nore =

Mountain in Aude, France

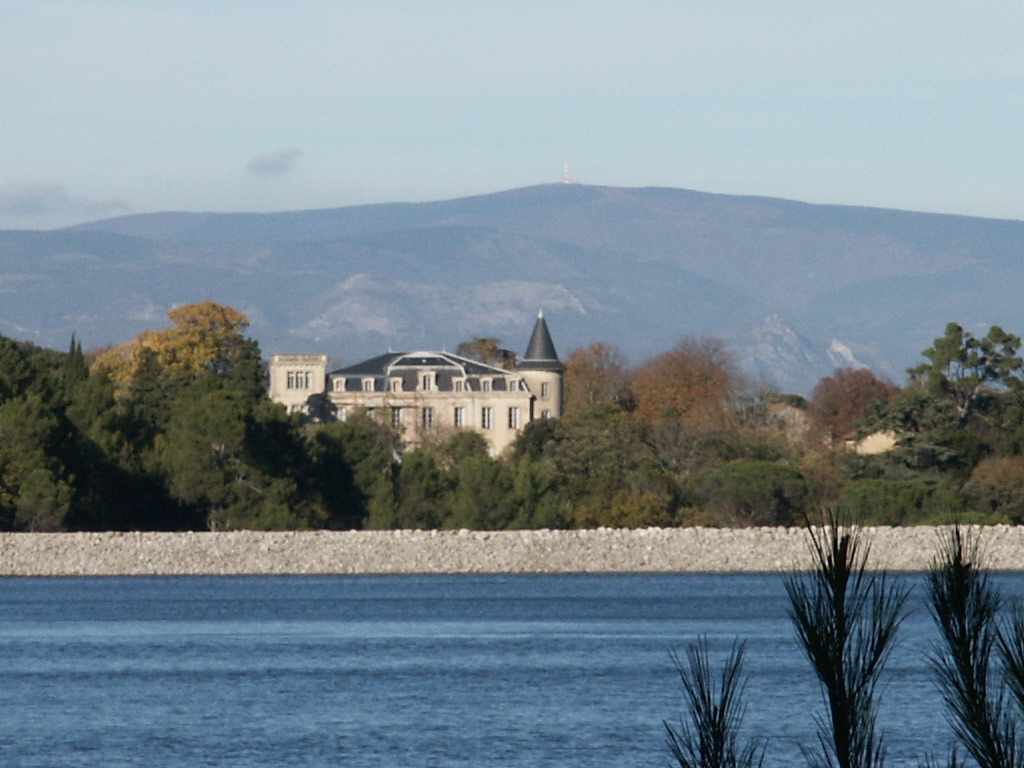

Highest point
- Elevation: 1,211 m (3,973 ft)
- Coordinates: 43°25′28″N 2°27′46″E

Geography
- Location: France
- Parent range: Montagne Noire

The pic de Nore (Occitan: Nòra) at 1,211 metres (3,973 ft) is the highest point in the Montagne Noire, on the border of the Aude and Tarn departments, near to the Parc naturel régional du Haut-Languedoc in southern France. The Arnette and Clamoux rivers both have their sources on the slopes.

== Landmarks ==
The main feature of the summit is the 102 metre transmission tower, which broadcasts:

- FM : 4 transmitters at 80 kW PAR.
- Analogue TV: 1 transmitter in VHF at 100 kW PAR / 2 transmitters in UHF at 56 kW PAR / 3 transmitters in UHF at 160 kW PAR / 1 transmitter in UHF at 205 kW PAR.
- Digital TV: 5 transmitters in UHF at 8 kW PAR.

== Cycling ==
Since 2002 the summit is the finishing line for two timed climbs from Mazamet and Villegly (flat until Cabrespine).

The current record holder for both routes is Michel Ambrosini:

- Mazamet (via Pradelles): 52 min 30 s (28.57 km/h)
- Cabrespine: 40 min 52 s (25.69 km/h)

The climb from Cabrespine is 17.5 km long with a 5.4% average gradient.

The climb from Mazamet is 17 km long with a 5.7% average gradient.

The climb up the slopes of Mas Cabardès, is shorter, at 15.1 km with a 6.1% average gradient but with some very difficult passages over 13%.

The Tour de France passed over the summit for the first time on Stage 15 of the 2018 tour.
