= Sidobre =

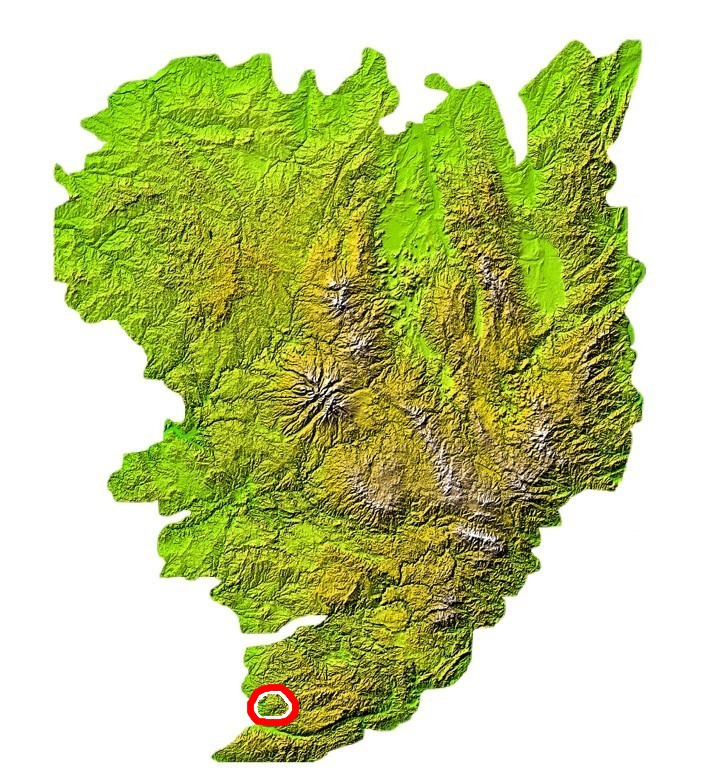
- Location of Sidobre within the Massif Central

Highest point
- Peak: Le Patau
- Elevation: 707 m (2,320 ft)

Dimensions
- Area: 88 km^{2} (34 mi^{2})

Geography
- Country: France
- Region: Tarn, Midi-Pyrénées
- Settlements: Lacrouzette, Ferrières and Saint-Salvy-de-la-Balme
- Range coordinates: 43°38′N 2°24′E
- Borders on: Monts de Lacaune, Montagne Noire and Castrais

Geology
- Rock type: granite rock

The Sidobre is a mountainous area located in the south of the Massif central, in central France. It consists of a plateau made of granite, 15.3 km long, 6.6 km wide and covered with forests. Its highest point is in the lieu-dit “Le Patau” (707 m).

== Location ==
It is located in the Tarn department, at the South-Western end of the Massif central, between Lacrouzette, Ferrières, Saint-Salvy-de-la-Balme and Lafontasse, surrounded by the following natural regions :

- East : the Mounts of Lacaune
- South : the Montagne Noire
- West : territory of Castres

== Geology ==
The granite of the Sidobre is a plutonic rock resulting from a Hercynian intrusion dated back (using the Rubidium-Strontium method) to 304 ± 8 Ma. The magma cooled down slowly and crystallised at a depth of 7.5 to 20 km. It eventually came to the surface with the erosion of the Cambrian metamorphic rocks. In the central part of the massif, the granite is a slightly porphyric granodiorite, hence its blue tints, while the outer part is essentially composed of monzonite.

== Sites ==
Originally composed by one single piece of rock, the Sidobre was cracked by the Pyrenean orogeny, thus becoming more exposed to the rhexistasy, which explain the remarkable natural forms and constructions of the site.

The Sidobre, while just adjacent to it, is totally independent from the Montagne Noire. They are separated by the sedimentary basin of Castres and the channel of the river Thoré”.

This stunning site, with its dozens of huge strange-shaped rocks, is unique in Europe (other sites exist in France, but in a much smaller scale), and has inspired many legends and tales.

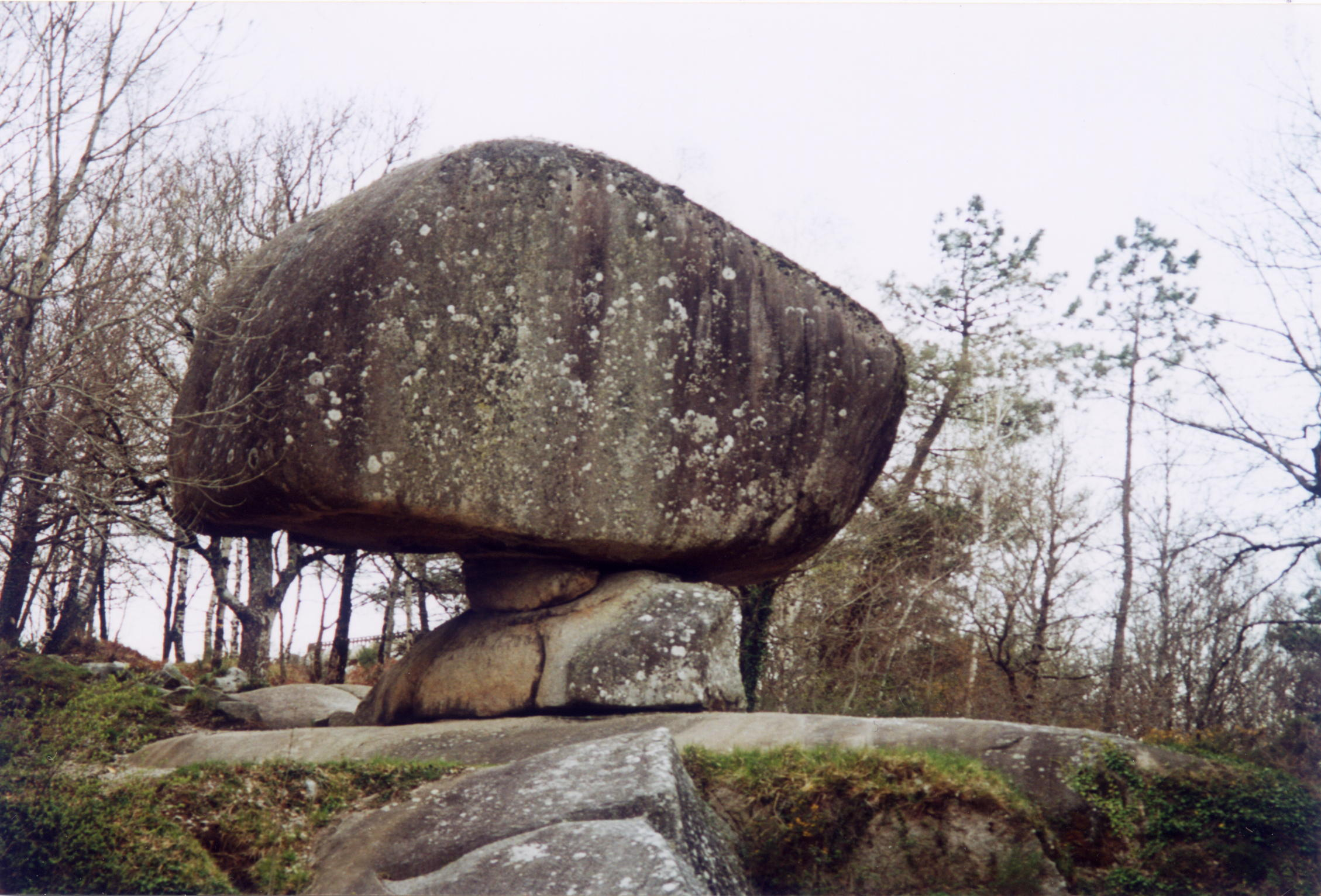
Le Peyro Clabado, on the commune of Lacrouzette

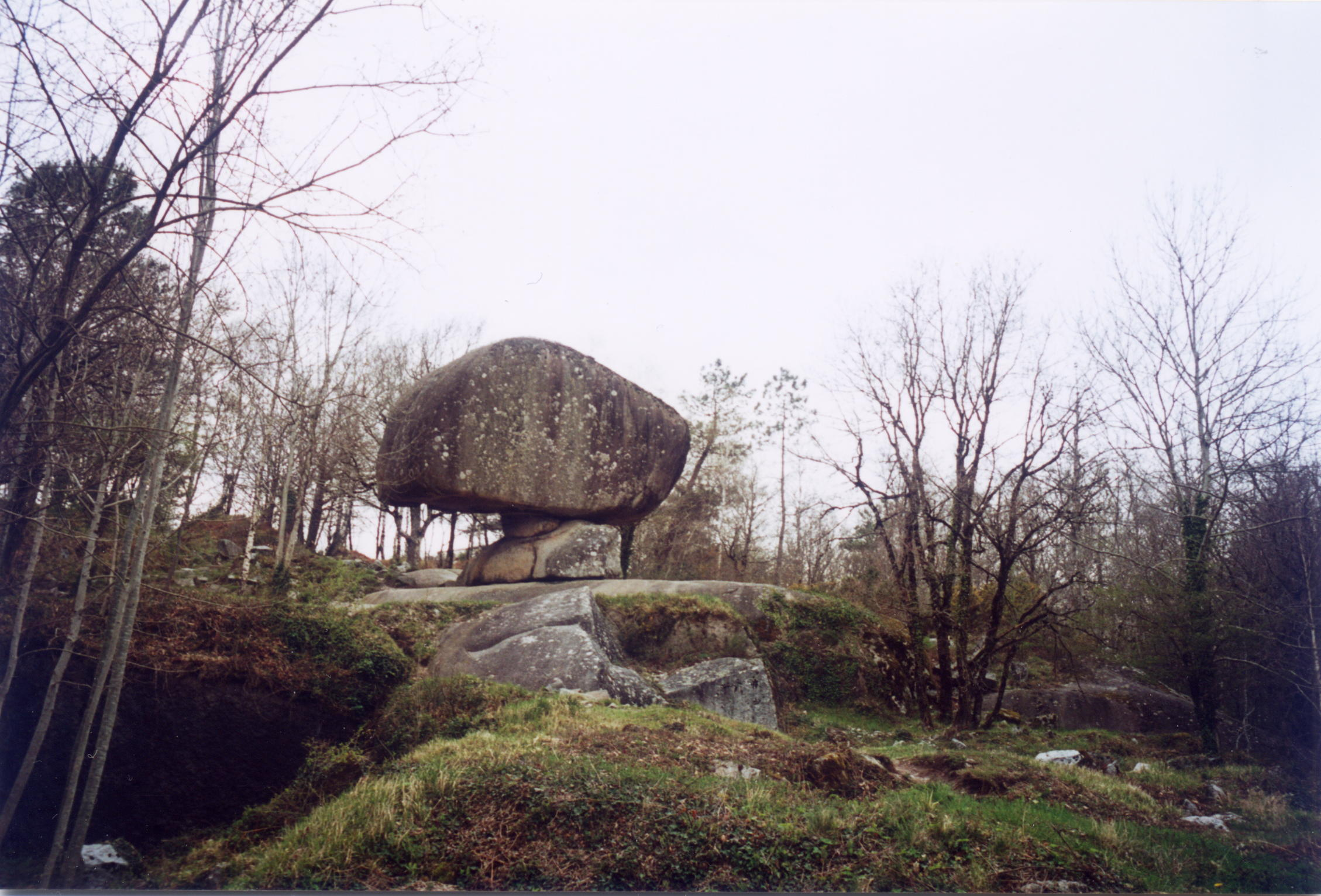
Le Peyro Clabado

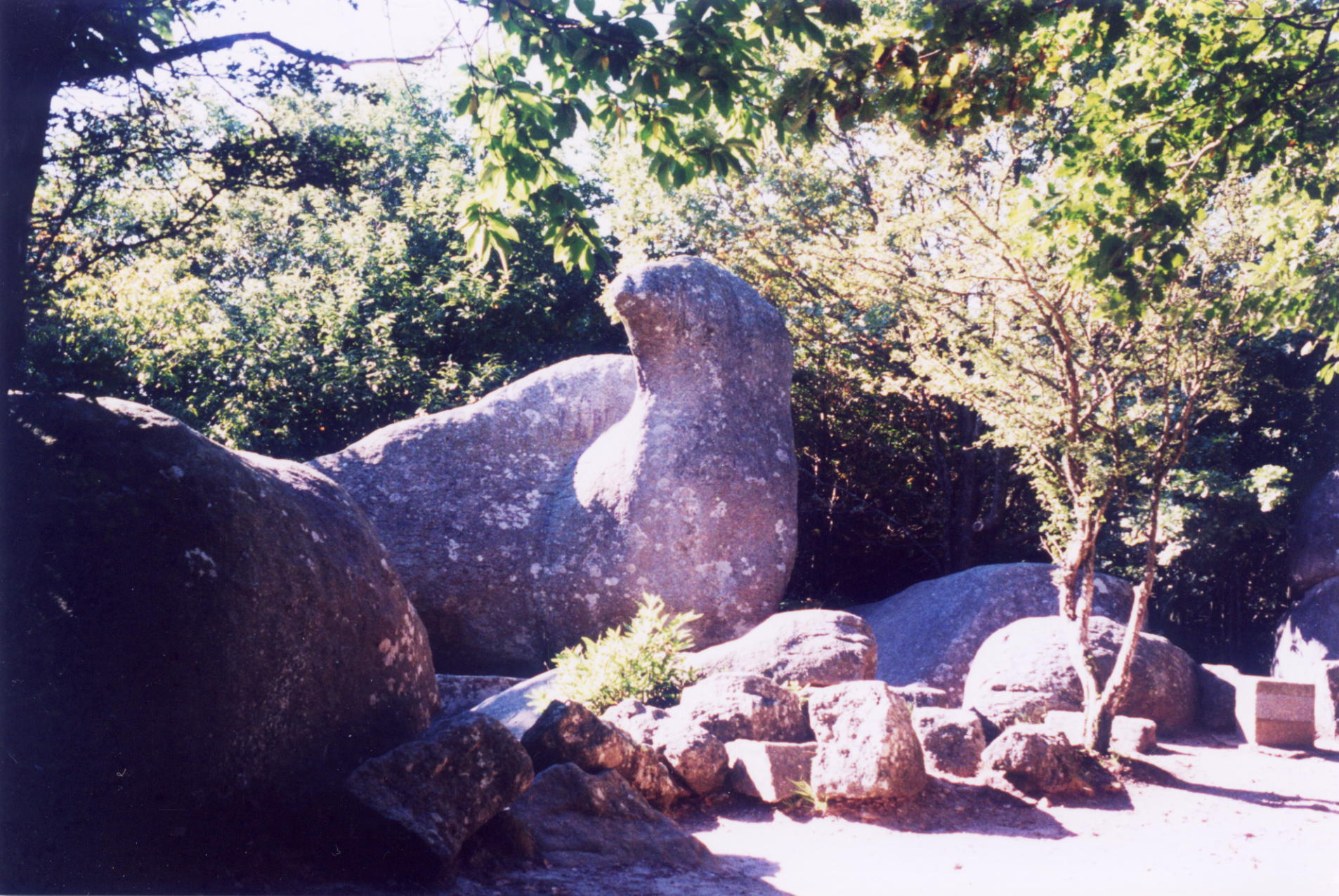
Le Roc de l'Oie (« The Rock of the Goose »)

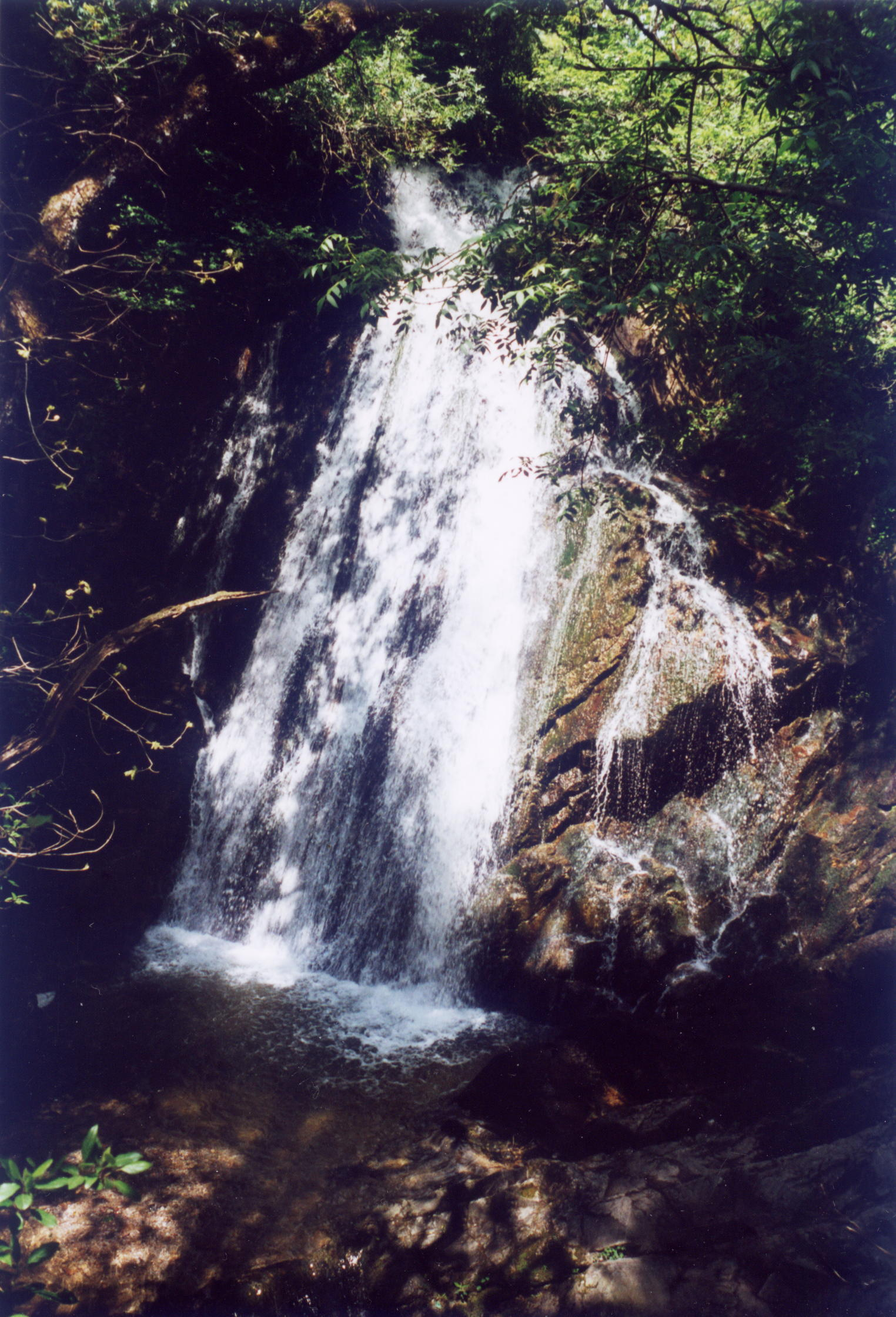
Waterfall in the Sidobre

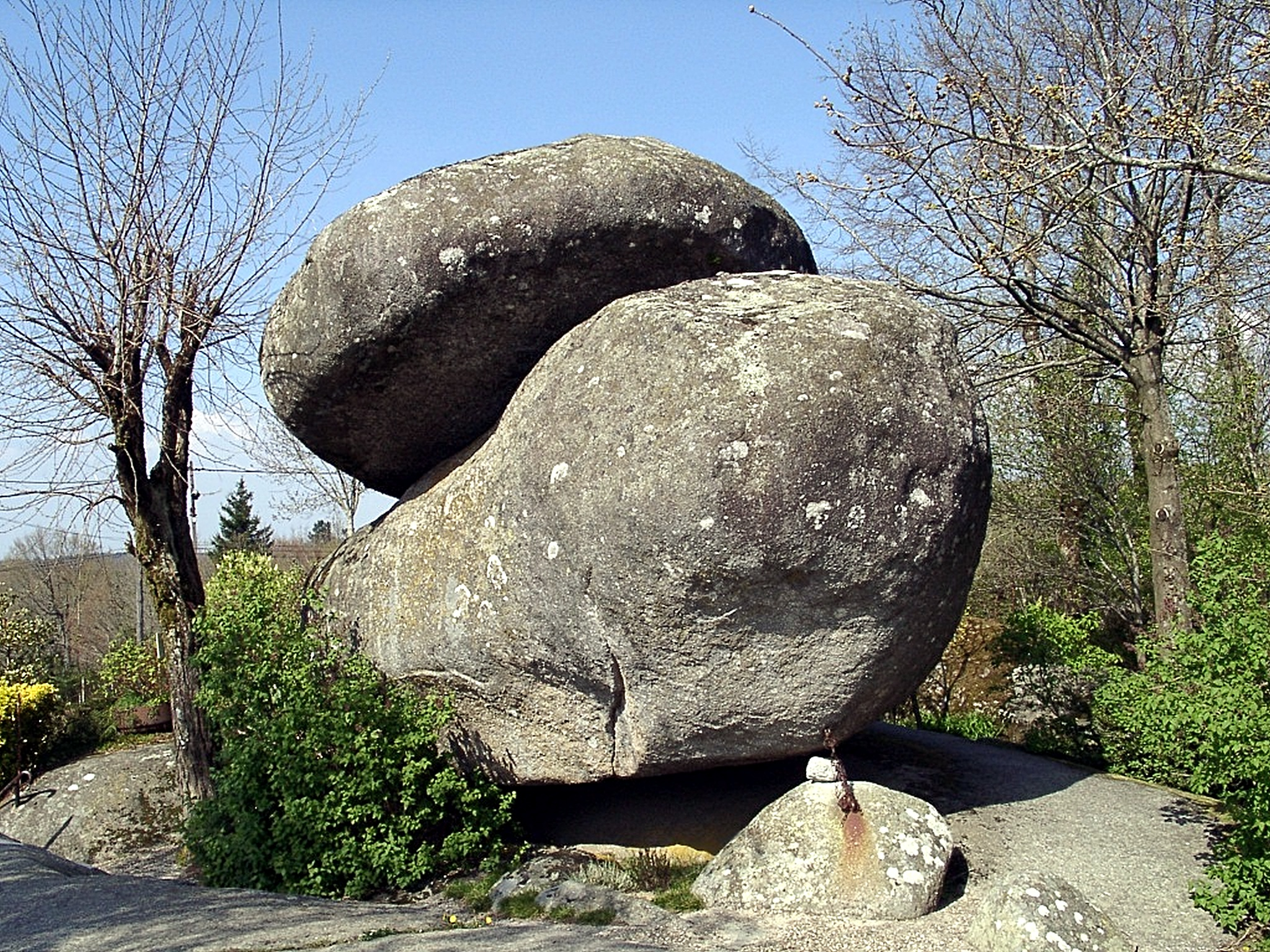
Trembling rock in Sept-Faux

== Economy ==

The Sidobre is an important zone of quarrying, representing half of the granite production in France, with about 1,200 employees and 100 companies. Because of competition from China, there has been a steady decrease in the number of quarries since the 1950s, with barely fifteen nowadays, though these have grown bigger. The granite is used for many purposes: pavements, airport runways, funerary art...

While mass tourism is still uncommon in the area, local tourism also contributes to the Sidobre's economy.

The site and its environment have been placed under the protection of the Haut-Languedoc Regional Nature Park.

== See also ==
- Tourism in Tarn
