= Le Verdier =

- Commune
- Location of Le Verdier
- Location within France Location within Occitanie
- Coordinates: 43°59′22″N 1°50′33″E
- Country: France
- Region: Occitania
- Department: Tarn
- Arrondissement: Albi
- Canton: Vignobles et Bastides
- Intercommunality: CA Gaillac-Graulhet

Government
  - Mayor (2022–2026): Sylvie Da Silva
- Area^{1}: 9.54 km^{2} (3.68 sq mi)
- Elevation: 180 m (590 ft)
- Highest elevation: 290 m (950 ft)
- Lowest elevation: 169 m (554 ft)
- Population (2023): 225
  - Density: 23.6/km^{2} (61.1/sq mi)
- Time zone: UTC+01:00 (CET)
  - Summer (DST): UTC+02:00 (CEST)
- INSEE/Postal code: 81313 /81140
- ^{1} French Land Register data, which excludes lakes, ponds, glaciers > 1 km^{2} (0.386 sq mi or 247 acres) and river estuaries.

Le Verdier (French pronunciation: [lə vɛʁdje]; Occitan: Lo Verdièr, meaning the orchard) is a commune in the Tarn department in southern France.

== Geography ==
The Vère flows west-southwestward through the southern part of the commune.

== See also ==
- Communes of the Tarn department
