= Vieux, Tarn =

Vieux
- Commune
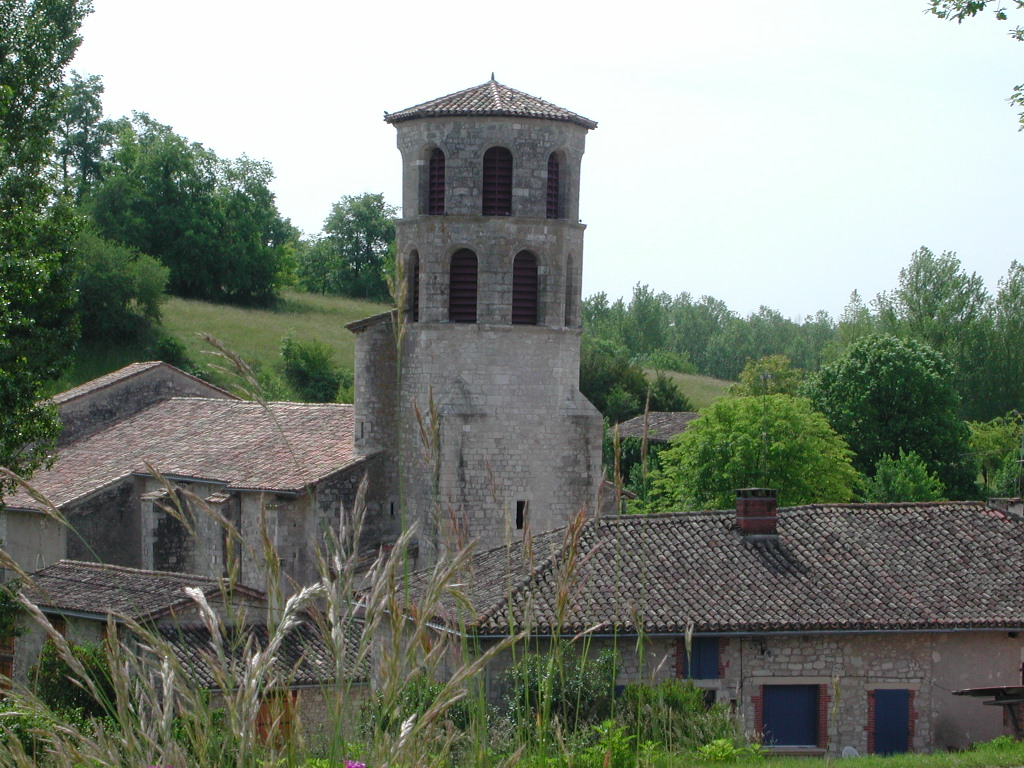
- The church in Vieux

- Coat of arms
- Location of Vieux
- Location within France Location within Occitanie
- Coordinates: 43°59′39″N 1°52′24″E
- Country: France
- Region: Occitania
- Department: Tarn
- Arrondissement: Albi
- Canton: Vignobles et Bastides
- Intercommunality: CA Gaillac-Graulhet

Government
  - Mayor (2020–2026): Guy Legros
- Area^{1}: 6.95 km^{2} (2.68 sq mi)
- Elevation: 190 m (620 ft)
- Highest elevation: 271 m (889 ft)
- Lowest elevation: 170 m (560 ft)
- Population (2023): 230
  - Density: 33/km^{2} (86/sq mi)
- Time zone: UTC+01:00 (CET)
  - Summer (DST): UTC+02:00 (CEST)
- INSEE/Postal code: 81316 /81140
- ^{1} French Land Register data, which excludes lakes, ponds, glaciers > 1 km^{2} (0.386 sq mi or 247 acres) and river estuaries.

Vieux (French pronunciation: [vjø]; Occitan: Vius) is a commune in the Tarn department in southern France.

== Geography ==
The village lies in the southern part of the commune, on the right bank of the Vère, which flows westward through the commune.

== See also ==
- Communes of the Tarn department
