= Sainte-Cécile-du-Cayrou =

- Commune
- Location of Sainte-Cécile-du-Cayrou
- Location within France Location within Occitanie
- Coordinates: 44°00′17″N 1°48′38″E
- Country: France
- Region: Occitania
- Department: Tarn
- Arrondissement: Albi
- Canton: Vignobles et Bastides
- Intercommunality: CA Gaillac-Graulhet

Government
  - Mayor (2020–2026): Lucette Routaboul
- Area^{1}: 7.95 km^{2} (3.07 sq mi)
- Elevation: 305 m (1,001 ft)
- Highest elevation: 384 m (1,260 ft)
- Lowest elevation: 170 m (560 ft)
- Population (2023): 126
  - Density: 15.8/km^{2} (41.0/sq mi)
- Time zone: UTC+01:00 (CET)
  - Summer (DST): UTC+02:00 (CEST)
- INSEE/Postal code: 81246 /81140
- ^{1} French Land Register data, which excludes lakes, ponds, glaciers > 1 km^{2} (0.386 sq mi or 247 acres) and river estuaries.

Sainte-Cécile-du-Cayrou (French pronunciation: [sɛ̃t sesil dy kɛʁu]; Languedocien: Santa Ceselha del Cairon) is a commune in the Tarn department in southern France.

== Geography ==
The Vère forms part of the commune's southern border.

== See also ==
- Communes of the Tarn department
