= Cahuzac-sur-Vère =

- Commune
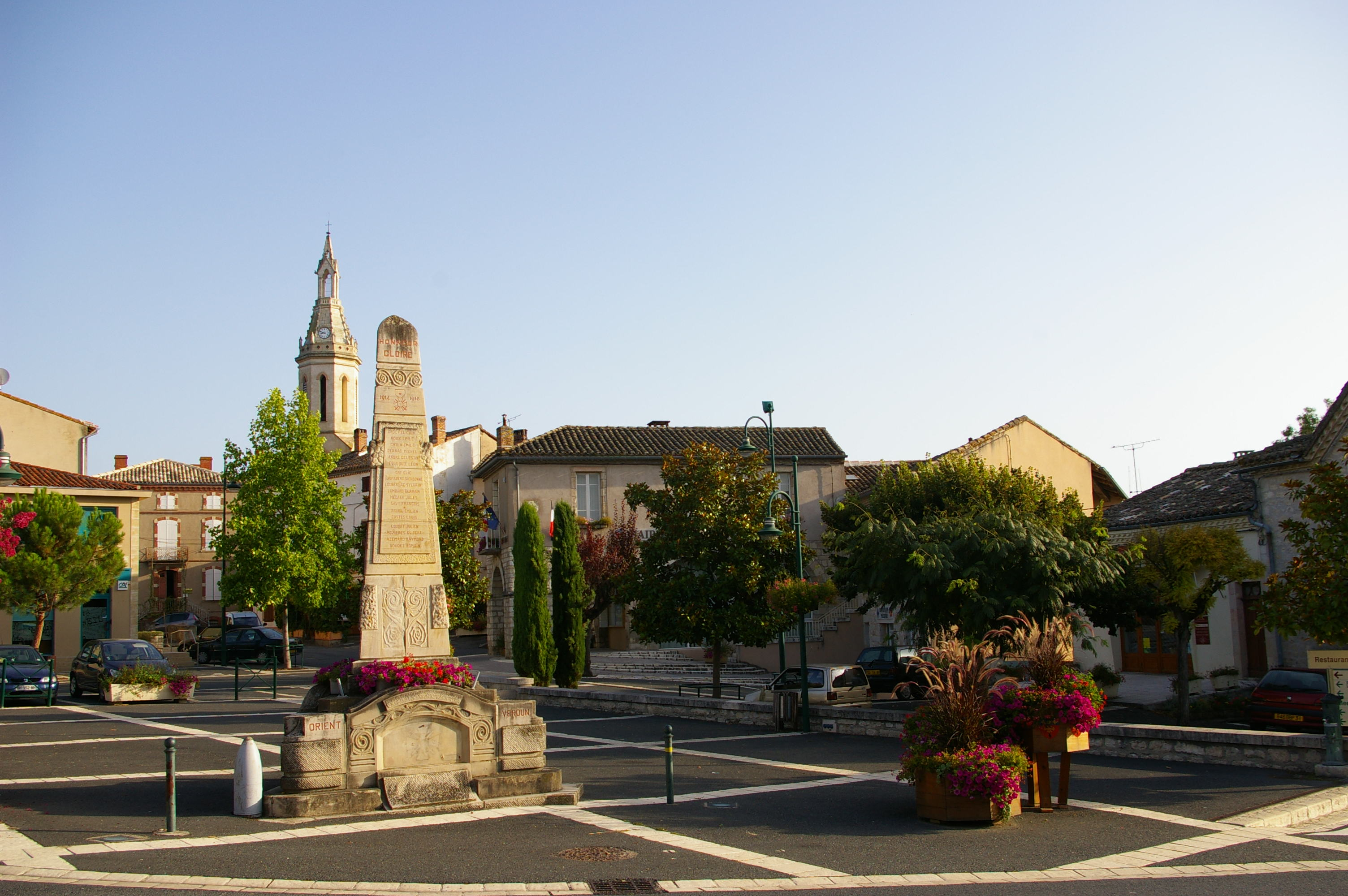
- The centre of Cahuzac-sur-Vère

- Coat of arms
- Location of Cahuzac-sur-Vère
- Location within France Location within Occitanie
- Coordinates: 43°59′03″N 1°54′42″E
- Country: France
- Region: Occitania
- Department: Tarn
- Arrondissement: Albi
- Canton: Vignobles et Bastides
- Intercommunality: CA Gaillac-Graulhet

Government
  - Mayor (2020–2026): Michel Bonnet
- Area^{1}: 30.58 km^{2} (11.81 sq mi)
- Elevation: 192 m (630 ft)
- Highest elevation: 288 m (945 ft)
- Lowest elevation: 173 m (568 ft)
- Population (2023): 1,239
  - Density: 40.52/km^{2} (104.9/sq mi)
- Time zone: UTC+01:00 (CET)
  - Summer (DST): UTC+02:00 (CEST)
- INSEE/Postal code: 81051 /81140
- ^{1} French Land Register data, which excludes lakes, ponds, glaciers > 1 km^{2} (0.386 sq mi or 247 acres) and river estuaries.

Cahuzac-sur-Vère (French pronunciation: [ka.yzak syʁ vɛʁ], literally Cahuzac on Vère; Occitan: Caüsac de Vera) is a commune in the Tarn department in southern France. The people of Cahuzac are called Cahuzacois.

== Geography ==
The Vère flows westward through the middle of the commune and crosses the village.

== See also ==
- Communes of the Tarn department
