= Larroque, Tarn =

Larroque
- Commune
- Location of Larroque
- Location within France Location within Occitanie
- Coordinates: 44°00′15″N 1°41′27″E
- Country: France
- Region: Occitania
- Department: Tarn
- Arrondissement: Albi
- Canton: Vignobles et Bastides
- Intercommunality: CA Gaillac-Graulhet

Government
  - Mayor (2020–2026): Régine Mouliade
- Area^{1}: 17.97 km^{2} (6.94 sq mi)
- Elevation: 145 m (476 ft)
- Highest elevation: 462 m (1,516 ft)
- Lowest elevation: 115 m (377 ft)
- Population (2023): 167
  - Density: 9.29/km^{2} (24.1/sq mi)
- Time zone: UTC+01:00 (CET)
  - Summer (DST): UTC+02:00 (CEST)
- INSEE/Postal code: 81136 /81140
- ^{1} French Land Register data, which excludes lakes, ponds, glaciers > 1 km^{2} (0.386 sq mi or 247 acres) and river estuaries.

Larroque (French pronunciation: [laʁɔk]; Occitan: La Ròca, meaning the rock) is a commune in the Tarn department in southern France.

== Geography ==
The village lies in the middle of the commune, on the right bank of the Vère, which flows northwestward through the commune.

== See also ==
- Communes of the Tarn department
