= Puycelsi =

- Commune
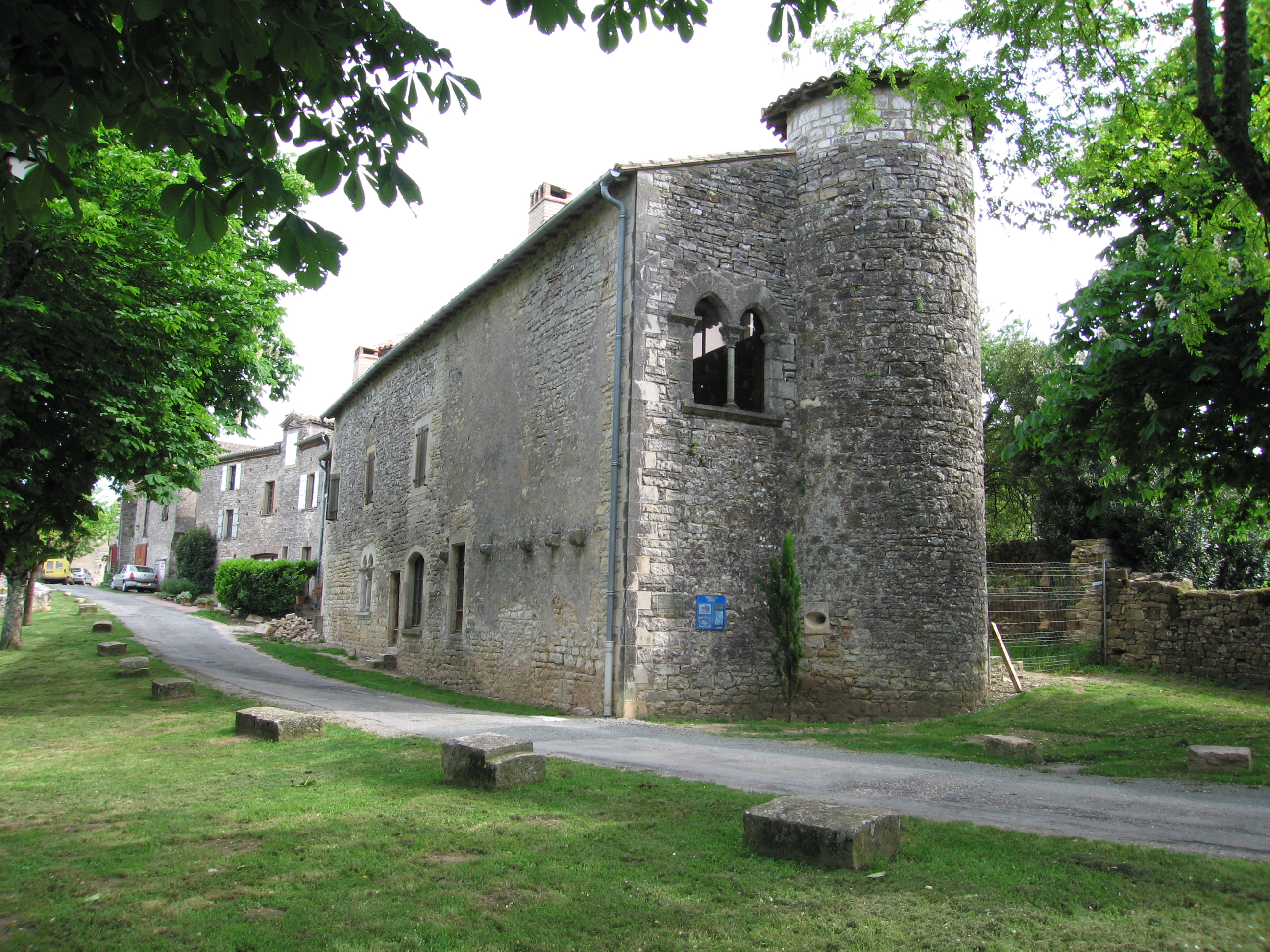
- 15th-century house in Puycelsi

- Coat of arms
- Location of Puycelsi
- Location within France Location within Occitanie
- Coordinates: 43°59′38″N 1°42′39″E
- Country: France
- Region: Occitania
- Department: Tarn
- Arrondissement: Albi
- Canton: Vignobles et Bastides
- Intercommunality: CA Gaillac-Graulhet

Government
  - Mayor (2022–2026): Jacques Vigouroux
- Area^{1}: 39.2 km^{2} (15.1 sq mi)
- Elevation: 280 m (920 ft)
- Highest elevation: 367 m (1,204 ft)
- Lowest elevation: 132 m (433 ft)
- Population (2023): 456
  - Density: 11.6/km^{2} (30.1/sq mi)
- Time zone: UTC+01:00 (CET)
  - Summer (DST): UTC+02:00 (CEST)
- INSEE/Postal code: 81217 /81140
- ^{1} French Land Register data, which excludes lakes, ponds, glaciers > 1 km^{2} (0.386 sq mi or 247 acres) and river estuaries.

Puycelsi (French pronunciation: [pɥisɛlsi], before 2011: Puycelci; Occitan: Puègcèlsi) is a commune in the Tarn department in southern France.

It is a member of the Les Plus Beaux Villages de France ("The Most Beautiful Villages of France") association.

== Toponym ==
The name of "Puycelci", or "Puycelsi" comes from the Celtic "Celto Dun", a wooden fortress built on a hill, or oppidum, later transformed into "Podium Celsium" by the Romans.

== History ==
The village itself was founded in a location close to the ancient prehistoric site by Benedictine Monks from the Aurillac Abbey in the 10th century. It stands high above the right bank of the Vère, which flows northwestward through the commune.

The first castle was dismantled after the Treaty of Meaux-Paris, in 1229, but the village remained a stronghold. Though it was besieged several times in the 13th and 14th centuries, it was reportedly never taken by force.

Until the First World War, the village was quite prosperous, with a population of nearly 2,000 in 1830. Almost abandoned in the 1950s, it has since been restored by its inhabitants and is now listed among the “Most Beautiful Villages of France”.

Puycelsi is featured in the 2016 BBC/France Télévisions wildlife film Wild Tales from the Village.

=== Notable buildings ===
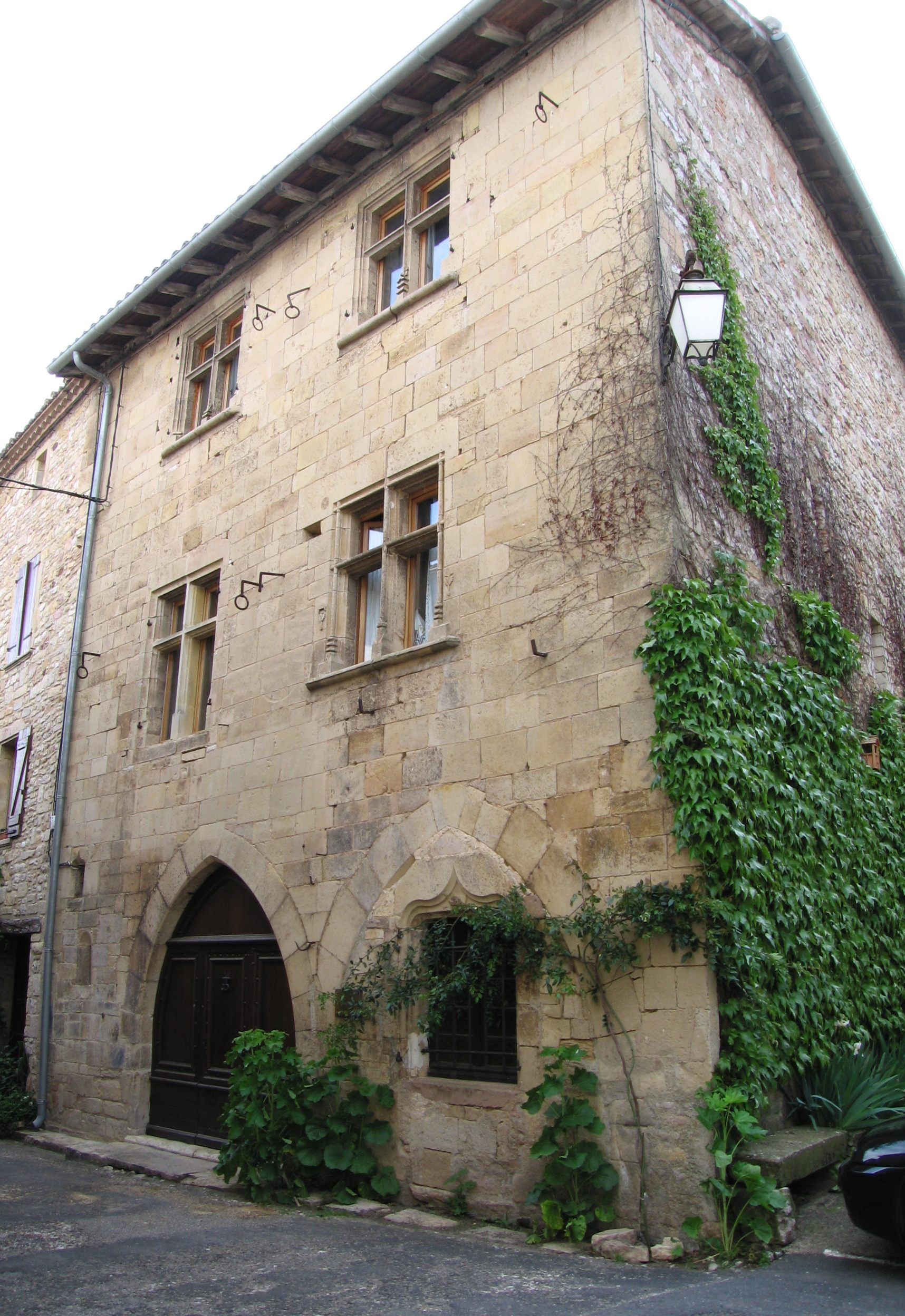
Renaissance House

- the 14th century ramparts, and the Irissou Gate with its double defensive system
- the St-Roch Chapel, built in 1703
- the 15th-century castle
- 15th-and-16th-century houses, including the town hall
- the 14th-15th-century St-Corneille Church, with classified well-preserved ancient furniture

== Demography ==
Historical population
Year	Pop.	±% p.a.
1968	535	—
1975	480	−1.54%
1982	442	−1.17%
1990	453	+0.31%
1999	495	+0.99%
2007	491	−0.10%
2012	474	−0.70%
2017	449	−1.08%
2023	456	+0.26%
Source: INSEE

== See also ==
- Communes of the Tarn department
- Tourism in Tarn
