= Tourism in Tarn =

The Tarn department is located in the southwest of France.

== Statistics ==
In 2009, there were:

- Nightly rentals: 8.6 million
- Beds available: 23,100
- Business hotels represented 305,000 tourists for a total of 470,200 nights
- Campsites represented 54,000 tourists for a total of 254,000 nights
- Around 152,350 nightly rentals booked from the two main centers (Tarn Reservation Tourisme and Gîtes de France)

== Historical and cultural attractions ==
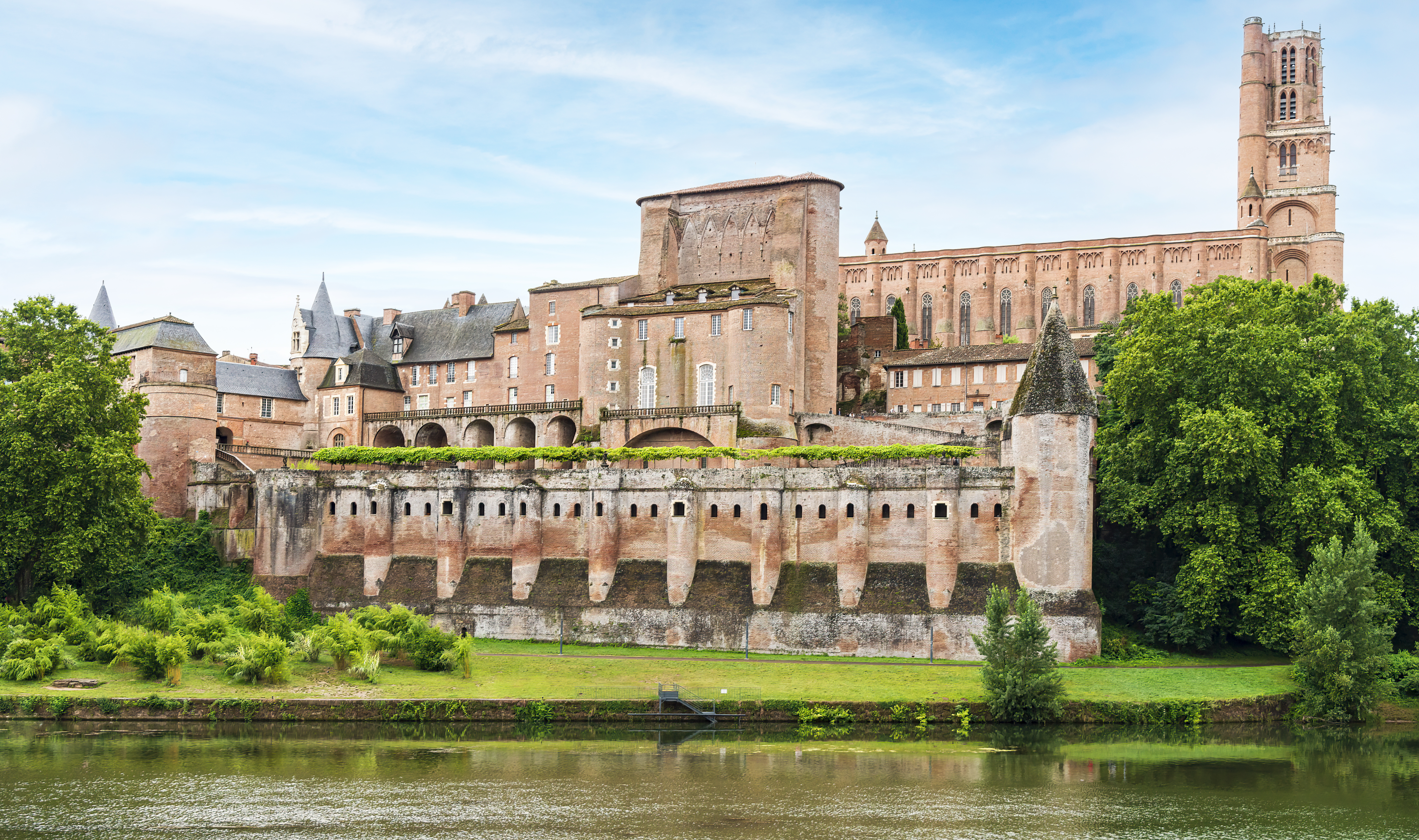
Episcopal City of Albi

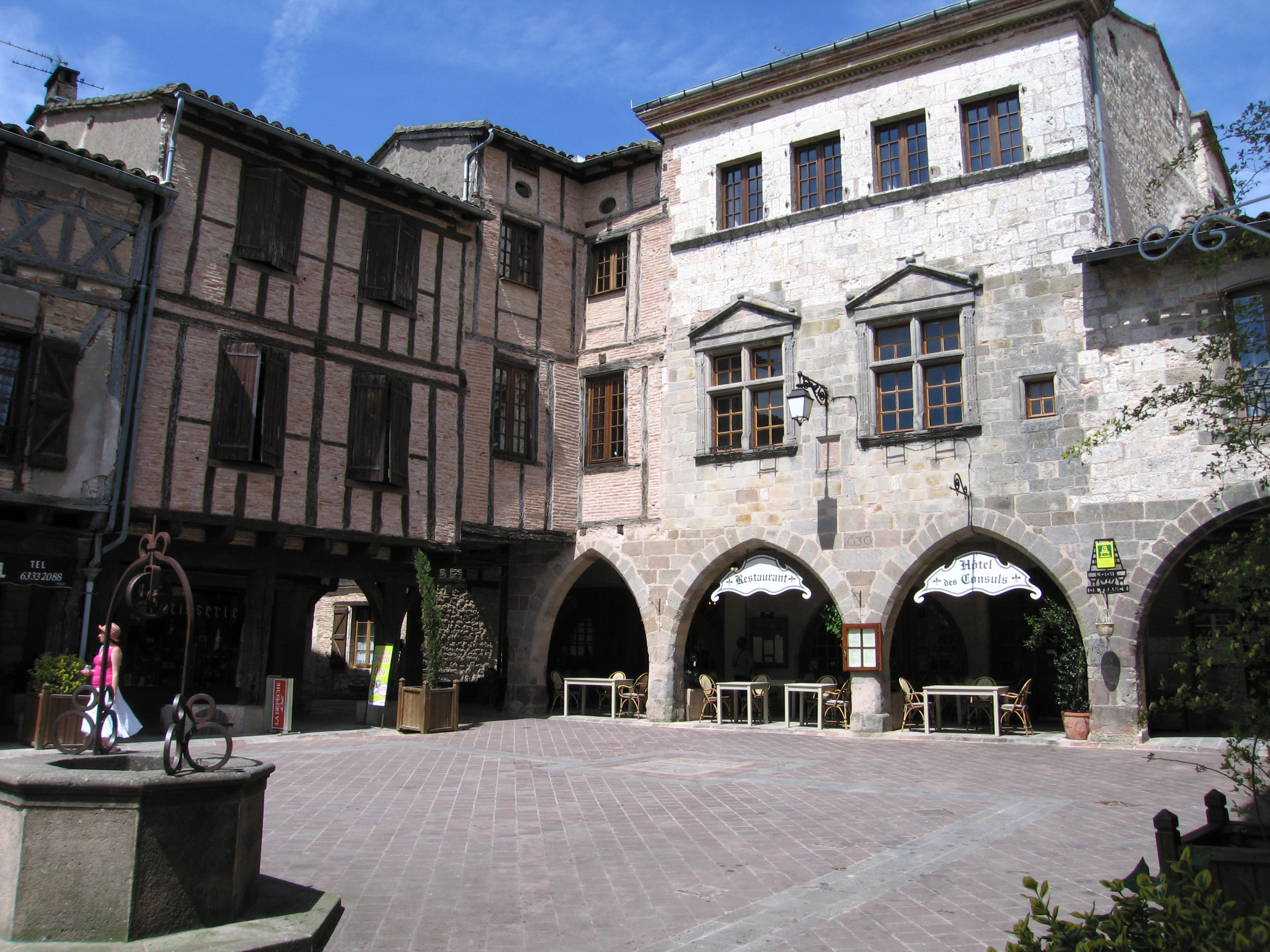
Castelnau de Montmiral

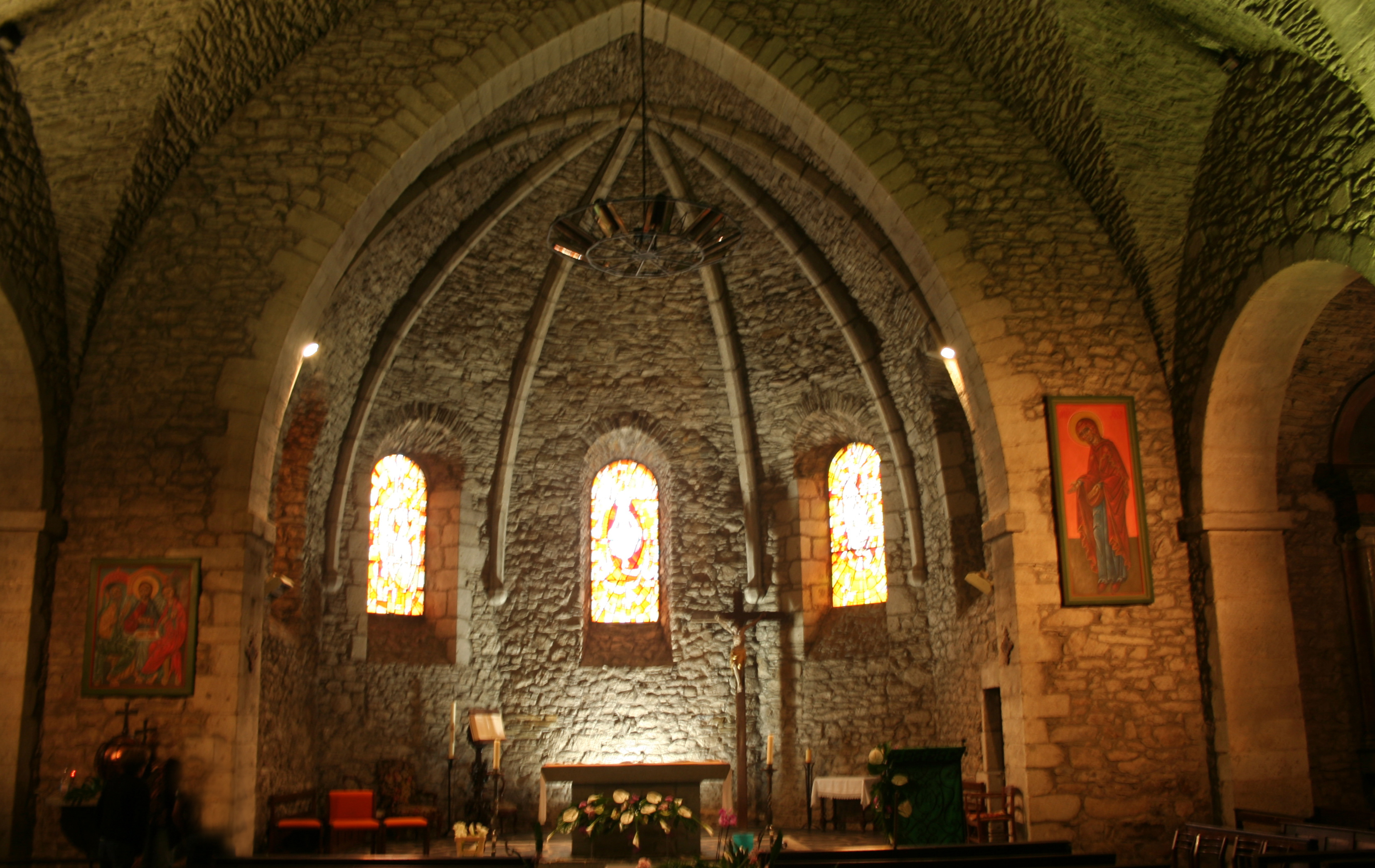
Choir of the Church Notre Dame in Lacaune

Steeped in history, from the Cathar era to the Industrial Revolution, the Tarn department has a rich heritage of fortified villages, castles, churches and museums. While the south-western houses are mostly stone-built, cities from the northwest of the department are often made of the local red brick, typical of the region.

- Albi and its Cathedral, dedicated to Saint-Cecilia. A unique red-brick fortified cathedral, renowned worldwide for its ornamented stone roodscreen. Together with the Berbie palace, a former bishops’ estate now home to the Toulouse-Lautrec Museum, it is the core of the Vieil-Alby, the ancient centre of the city, with its half-timbered and corbelled houses, that has been designated a UNESCO World Heritage Site in July 2010.
- The peninsula of Ambialet, with a view on the Tarn River from the Priory.
- Cagnac-les-Mines, its Mining Museum and the amusement park Cap découverte, located in a former open-sky mine.
- Castres and its houses on the Agoût River, the Goya Museum and Jean Jaures Museum.
- Carmaux and its Glass Museum, in an old chapel transformed into a workshop, with demonstrations on site.
- Graulhet with its Pont Vieux (the “Old Bridge”), built in 1244 and classified a “Monument Historique”, and the medieval district of Panessac (16th-and-17th-century timbered and corbelled housing). L'Hostellerie du Lyon d'Or, built in the 15th century and also listed a “Monument Historique”, was reportedly cherished by Henry de Navarre, the future King Henry IV, for gourmet moments.
- Gaillac is also a red-brick city, famous for its wine. You can also visit the St Michel Abbey.
- Lavaur and the St Alain Cathedral.

The department is also known for its heritage of remarkably well-preserved bastides (fortified villages built in the 13th century to protect the population from the Wars of Religion). Famous bastides include:

- Cordes-sur-Ciel the very first bastide, built in 1222.
- Castelnau-de-Montmiral
- Lautrec
- Labastide-de-Lévis
- Lisle-sur-Tarn
- Puycelci
- Rabastens
- Réalmont

Other renowned villages in the Tarn:

- Vabre and Brassac, with ruins of the Wars of Religion
- Ferrières and its Protestantism Museum.
- Lacaune, with its casino, a remainder from its past as a spa town.
- Mazamet, an industrial city, specialized in wool pulling, and Hautpoul, a medieval village nearby.

== Sports and natural attractions ==
=== Sports ===
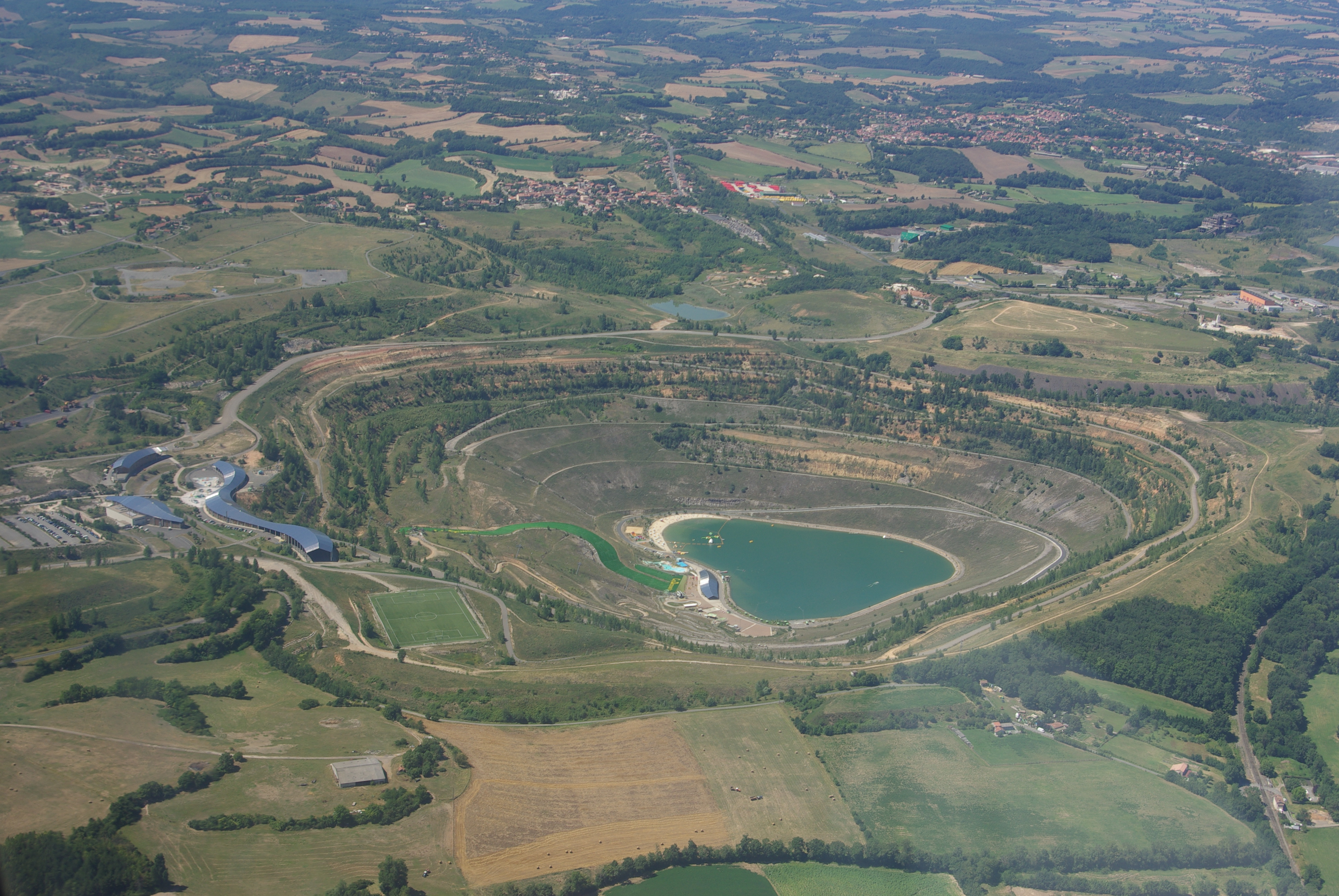
Cap'Découverte

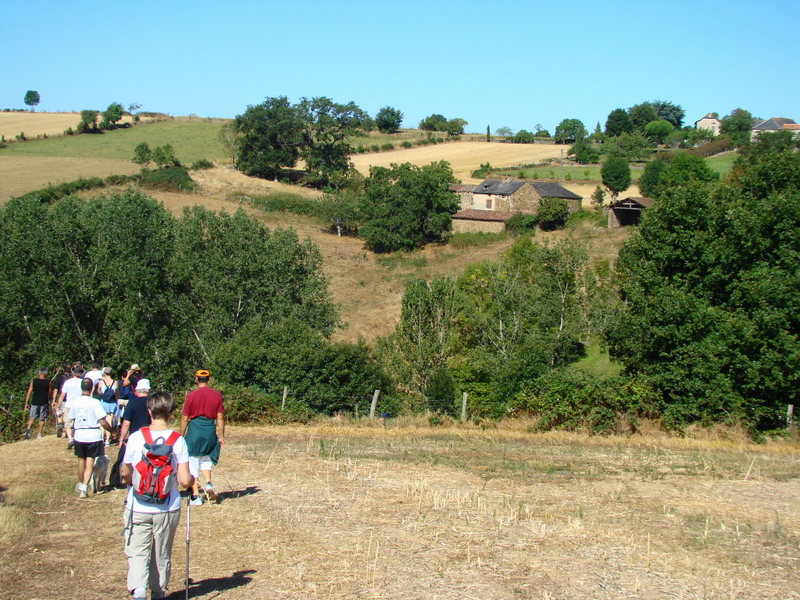
Hike in Montirat

Many outdoor activities such as hiking, skiing, canoeing and canyoneering can also be ways to discover the department and its landscapes. Tourists can also go swimming, fishing or sailing in the various lakes, either in the natural parks or in the rivers.

Close to Carmaux, Cap'Découverte, European leisure and adventure parks, located in a former open-sky mine, offers a range of activities: skiing or snowboarding on a synthetic track, swimming, biking, and such facilities as a luge track, a zip-line, a skate park, mini go-karts, a Mining Museum...

The Tarn offers golf courses for every level, from beginners to professional players. (see the Lasbordes Golf course in Albi).

Further South, you can view the Regional nature park of Haut-Languedoc and the Sidobre, a 245-million-year-old granite plateau.

=== Nature attractions ===
From the Tarn Valley to the Monts de Lacaune and the Montagne Noire, you can discover the “Pays de Cocagne” from various angles: along with the stream, up in the air, among the trees, or with the many routes and GR Trails.

In Albi or in Castres, mini-cruises in barges inspired by the traditional wooden boats are a good way to discover the secrets of the Tarn and Agoût Rivers.

The Chemin de Fer Touristique du Tarn (CFTT), or “Tarn Light Railway”, organises trips in the countryside in an authentic steam train.

Several parks and gardens are visible throughout the department.

=== Nature walks and hikes ===
The 3,500 km of hiking trails of the department can be explored trekking, biking or on horseback, with several regional horse farms organising riding tours.

== Festivals and events ==
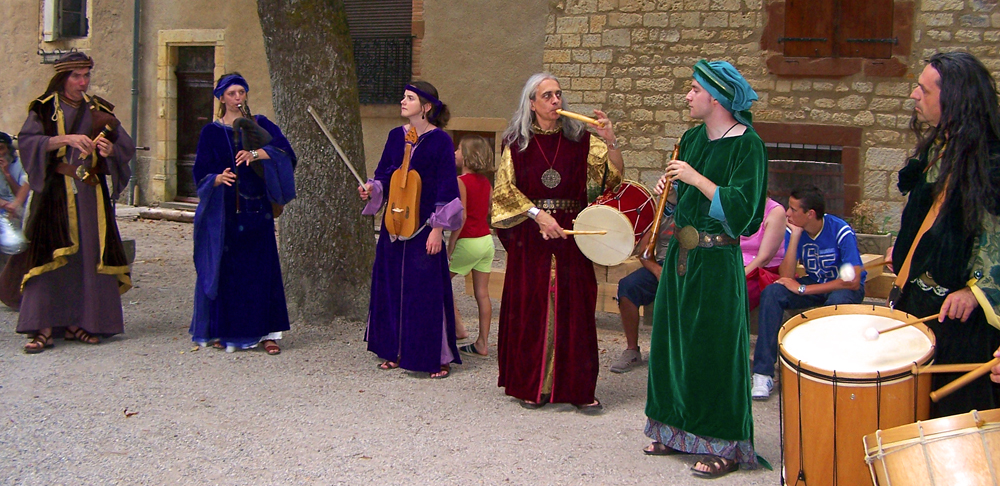
Medieval Festival of the Grand Fauconnier in Cordes-sur-Ciel

The Tarn offers a great diversity of cultural events. The Albi Carnival sets the tone in February and marks the kick-off of many festivals:

- the "Optimômes" festival in Mazamet in May.
- the "Cinéfeuilles" festival in Gaillac in June.
- Pause Guitare in Albi in July.
- Extravadanses in Castres in July.
- the "Musique sur Ciel" festival in Cordes-sur-Ciel in July.
- the "Couleurs du Monde" festival in Castres in August.
- the Summer Festival in Vaour in August.

Other events :

- the "Fêtes médiévales du Grand Fauconnier" in Cordes sur Ciel in July.
- the "Fête des Vins" (Wine festival) in Gaillac in August.
- the "Fête de l'Ail Rose" (Pink Garlic festival) in Lautrec in August.

The Grand Prix d'Albi takes place each year in September in the Circuit d'Albi-Le Sequestre.

== Family activities ==
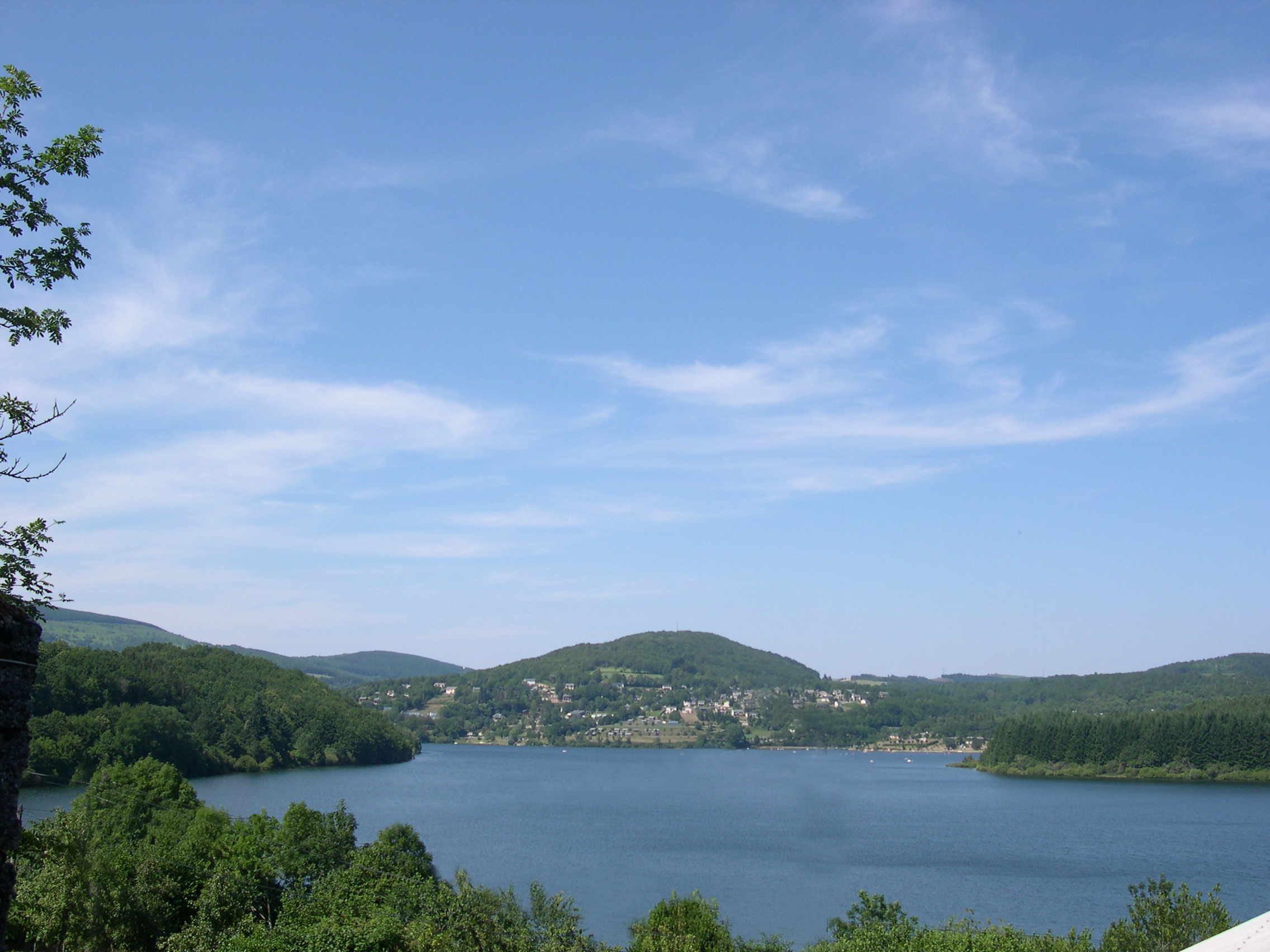
Laouzas Lake

- Various museums, guided tours or promenades offer the opportunity to discover the know-how, traditions and local customs that connect the generations.
- Water is everywhere in the Tarn: swimming pools, lakes, ponds, rivers...
- Horses, donkeys and farm animals are common in the region. Many farms organise practical trainings, visits and tours for tourists.
- Parks such as Cap'Decouverte, Adventure Park or the "Cri de Tarzan" park are designed for kids, with activities such as tree climbing, trampolines or zip wires...
- Children can discover the heritage of our ancestors the Gauls, the mysteries of the Solar System or the story of the Wild Boy of Aveyron through fun and exciting sites.

The major family-oriented festivals and events in Tarn include:

- the Albi Carnival in February.
- the "Spring and Chocolates" festival in Sorèze for Easter Sunday.
- the "Tarn from Farm to Farm" festival in April.
- the "Optimômes" festival in Mazamet in May.
- the "Cinéfeuilles" festival in Gaillac in June.
- the "Grand Fauconnier Medieval Festival" in Cordes-sur-Ciel in July.
- the Summer Festival in Vaour in August.
- various baking festivals in September.

== Gastronomy ==
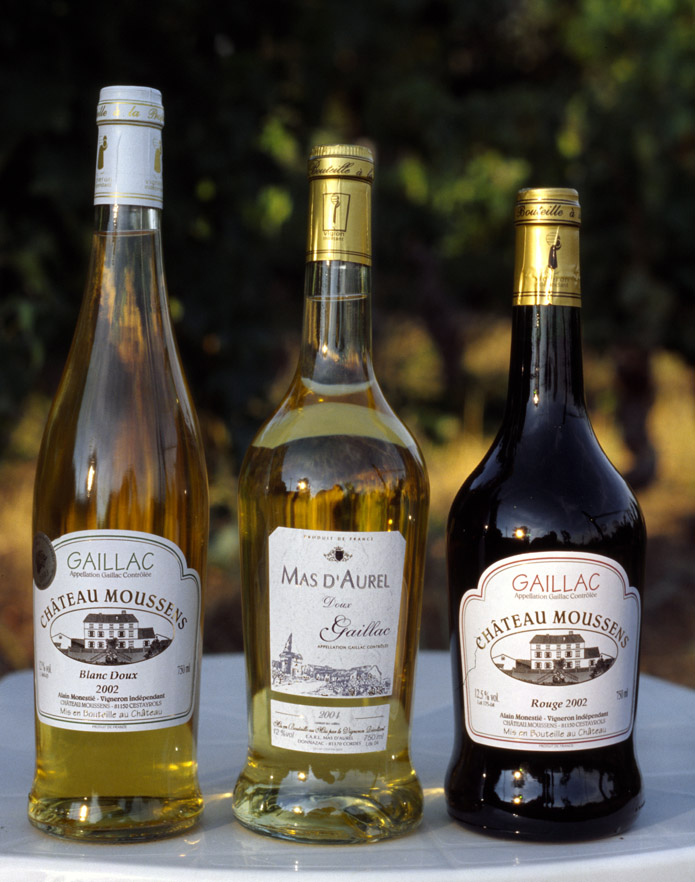
Gaillac wine

The Tarn is known for its terroir cuisine, local gastronomy and regional products that include: the delicatessen of Lacaune, the Pink Garlic of Lautrec, Gaillac wines...

The Gaillac wine, a wine of Southwest of France, is a testimony of the culture from Midi Toulousain. Gaillac winemakers still use specific grape varieties and methods for its vineyard.

The Pink Garlic of Lautrec comes in the form of a bulb with cloves (or bulblets) of a pink color. Its long period of dormancy gives it natural features of dry conservation.

Pork is a local specialty in Lacaune, where many sorts of delicatessen are produced: famous varieties of ham, sausages, and typical meats such as the melsat and the bougnettes...

== Tourist accommodations ==
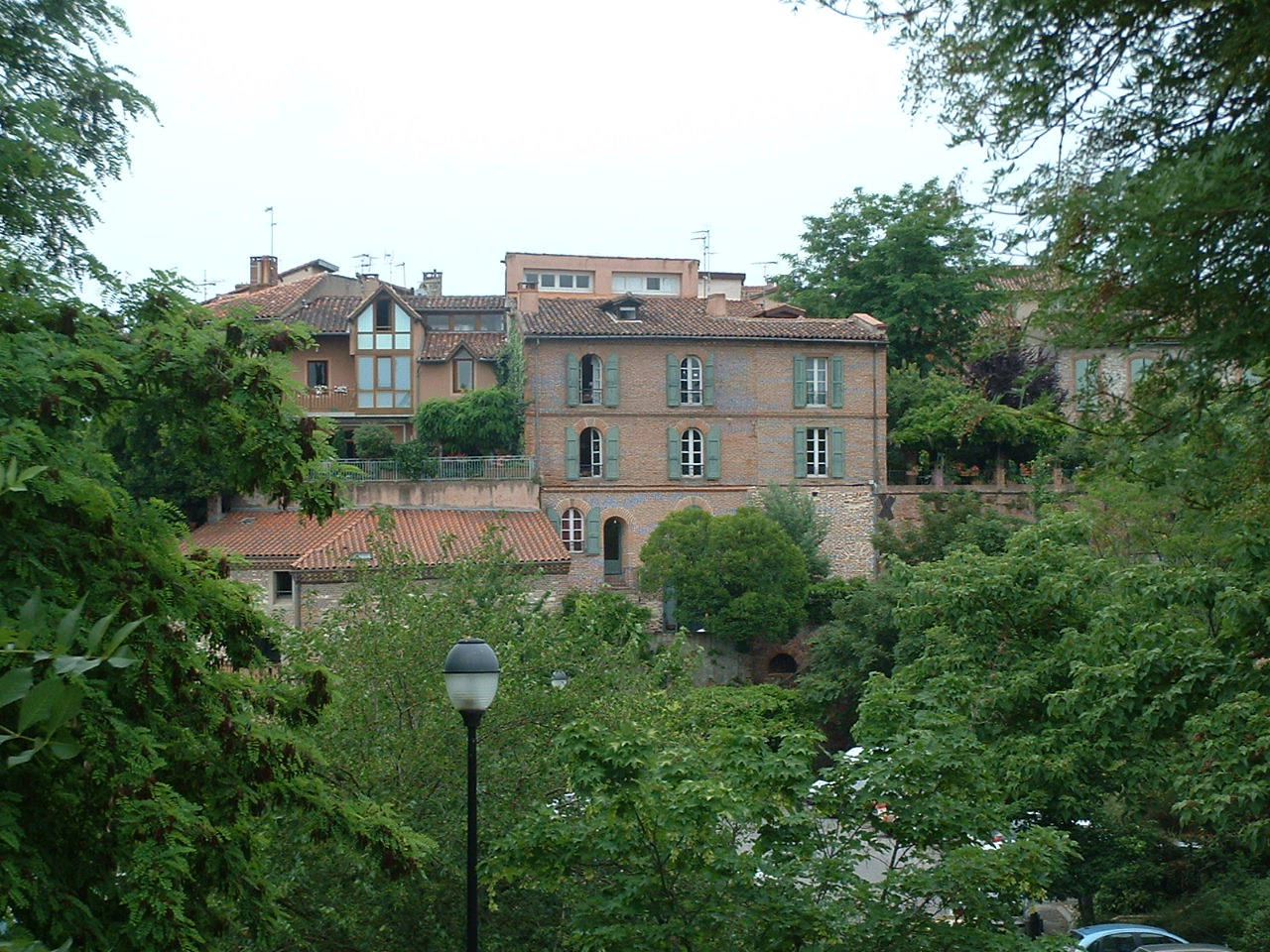

Tarn offers a wide range of institutions that can suit any kind of tourism and vacation plans: farmhouse inns, guest houses, bed and breakfast housing as well as campsites, hotels or Village Vacances... As of 2010 there were:

- 91 hotels
- 81 outdoor accommodation facilities (camping sites...)
- 17 villages and resorts
- Hundreds of furnished rentals

== Tourism and Handicap ==
"Tourism and Handicap" is a national label created by the Ministère du Tourisme. The result of a close collaboration between user groups and tourism professionals, it certifies that the main resorts and tourist attractions are accessible to people with disabilities, regardless of their disability. Each site is subject to an inspection conducted by trained assessors for this purpose.

In Tarn, about thirty providers are already accredited (accommodations, museums, etc.).
