= Taïx =

- Commune
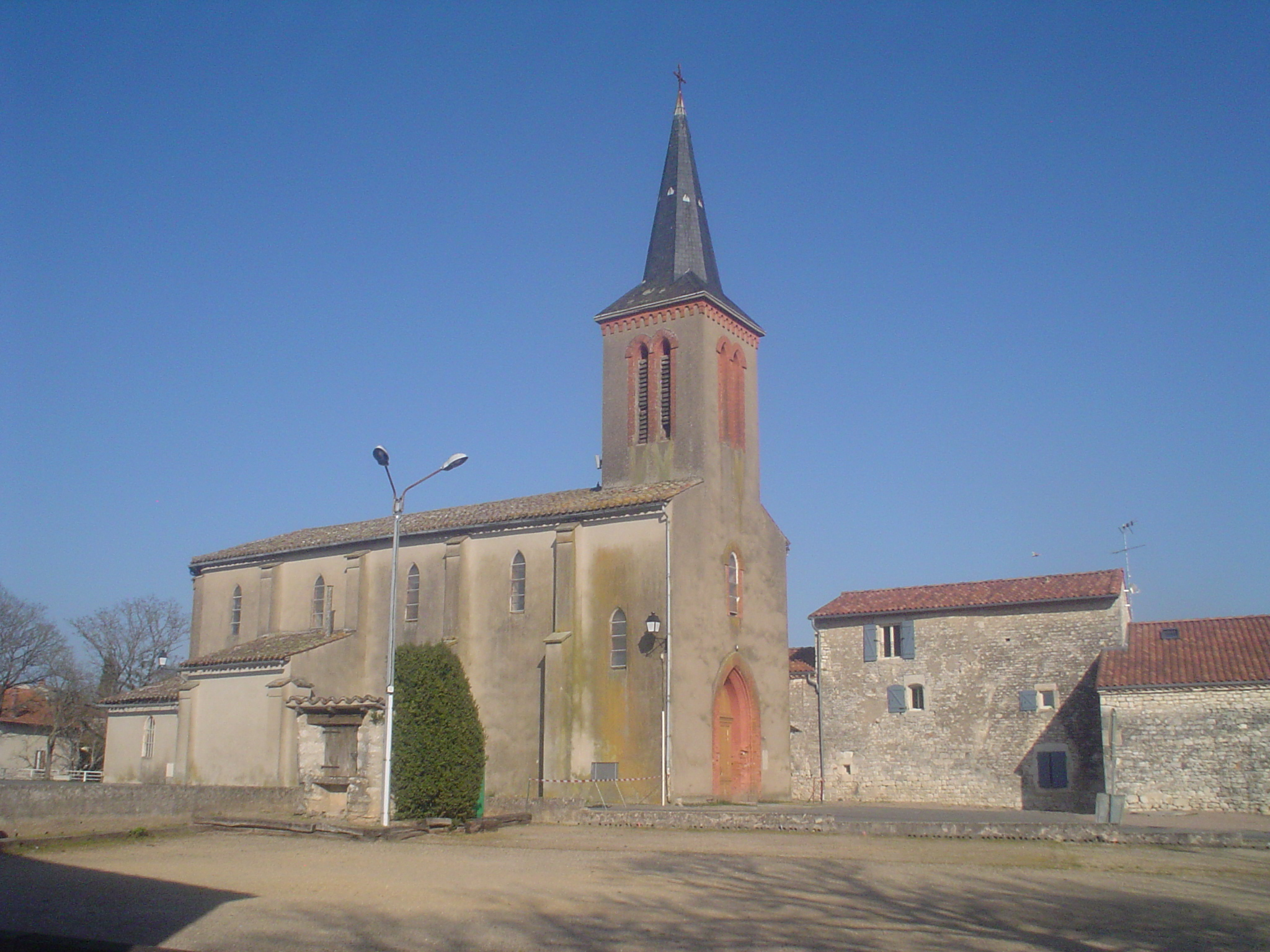
- The church in Taïx

- Coat of arms
- Location of Taïx
- Location within France Location within Occitanie
- Coordinates: 44°00′32″N 2°07′26″E
- Country: France
- Region: Occitania
- Department: Tarn
- Arrondissement: Albi
- Canton: Carmaux-2 Vallée du Cérou

Government
  - Mayor (2020–2026): Didier Somen
- Area^{1}: 4.76 km^{2} (1.84 sq mi)
- Elevation: 301 m (988 ft)
- Highest elevation: 347 m (1,138 ft)
- Lowest elevation: 275 m (902 ft)
- Population (2023): 553
  - Density: 116/km^{2} (301/sq mi)
- Time zone: UTC+01:00 (CET)
  - Summer (DST): UTC+02:00 (CEST)
- INSEE/Postal code: 81291 /81130
- ^{1} French Land Register data, which excludes lakes, ponds, glaciers > 1 km^{2} (0.386 sq mi or 247 acres) and river estuaries.

Taïx is a commune in the Tarn department in southern France.

== Geography ==
The river Vère rises in the south-eastern part of the commune, then flows westward through its southern part.

== See also ==
- Communes of the Tarn department
