= Castelnau-de-Montmiral =

- Commune
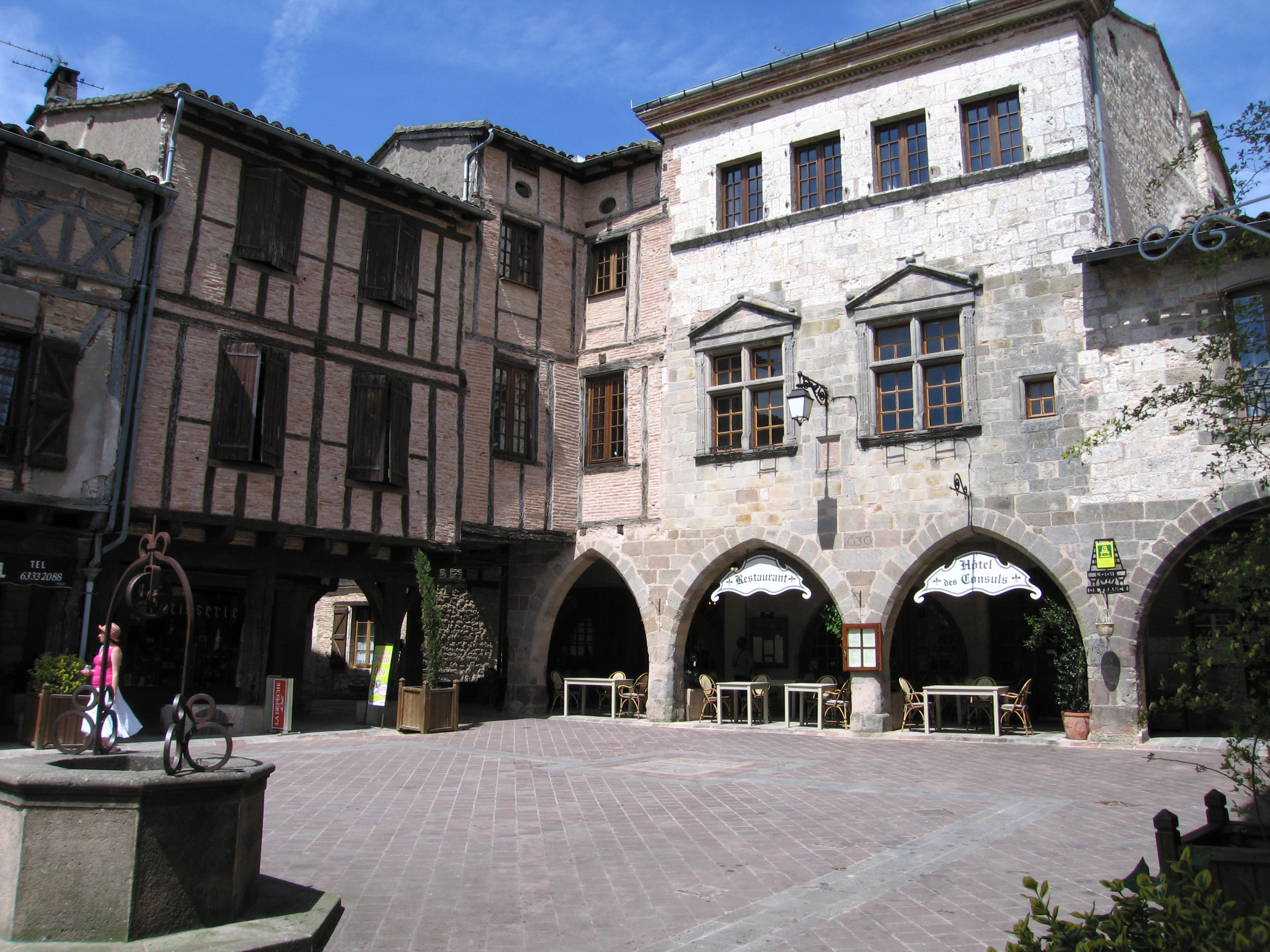
- The main square in Castelnau-de-Montmiral

- Coat of arms
- Location of Castelnau-de-Montmiral
- Location within France Location within Occitanie
- Coordinates: 43°57′59″N 1°49′18″E
- Country: France
- Region: Occitania
- Department: Tarn
- Arrondissement: Albi
- Canton: Vignobles et Bastides
- Intercommunality: CA Gaillac-Graulhet

Government
  - Mayor (2020–2026): Paul Salvador
- Area^{1}: 88.81 km^{2} (34.29 sq mi)
- Highest elevation: 485 m (1,591 ft)
- Lowest elevation: 153 m (502 ft)
- Population (2023): 1,062
  - Density: 11.96/km^{2} (30.97/sq mi)
- Time zone: UTC+01:00 (CET)
  - Summer (DST): UTC+02:00 (CEST)
- INSEE/Postal code: 81064 /81140
- ^{1} French Land Register data, which excludes lakes, ponds, glaciers > 1 km^{2} (0.386 sq mi or 247 acres) and river estuaries.

Castelnau-de-Montmiral (French pronunciation: [kastɛlno də mɔ̃miʁal]; Occitan: Castèlnòu de Montmiralh) is a commune in the Tarn department in southern France.

== Demography ==
Historical population
Year	Pop.	±% p.a.
1968	1,215	—
1975	1,037	−2.24%
1982	958	−1.13%
1990	910	−0.64%
1999	895	−0.18%
2007	946	+0.70%
2012	1,005	+1.22%
2017	1,033	+0.55%
2023	1,062	+0.46%
Source: INSEE

== Geography ==
The Vère flows westward through the commune.

== History ==
While traces of activities dating back to the Bronze Age such as dolmens and oppidums can be seen in the nearby forest La Grésigne, the village was founded as an albigensian bastide (fortified new town) in 1222 by Raymond VII, count of Toulouse, under the name “Castellum Novum Montis Mirabilis”.

During the subsequent years, the village remained an impressive stronghold. In 1345, during the Hundred Years' War, when Edward the Black Prince invaded the Albigeois, he reportedly left without besieging the village… Later, it served as a shelter for Catholics who were fleeing from Gaillac because of the Wars of Religion. King Louis XIII visited Castelnau in June 1622, and stayed in the “Tonnac” house.

== Remarkable sites and monuments ==
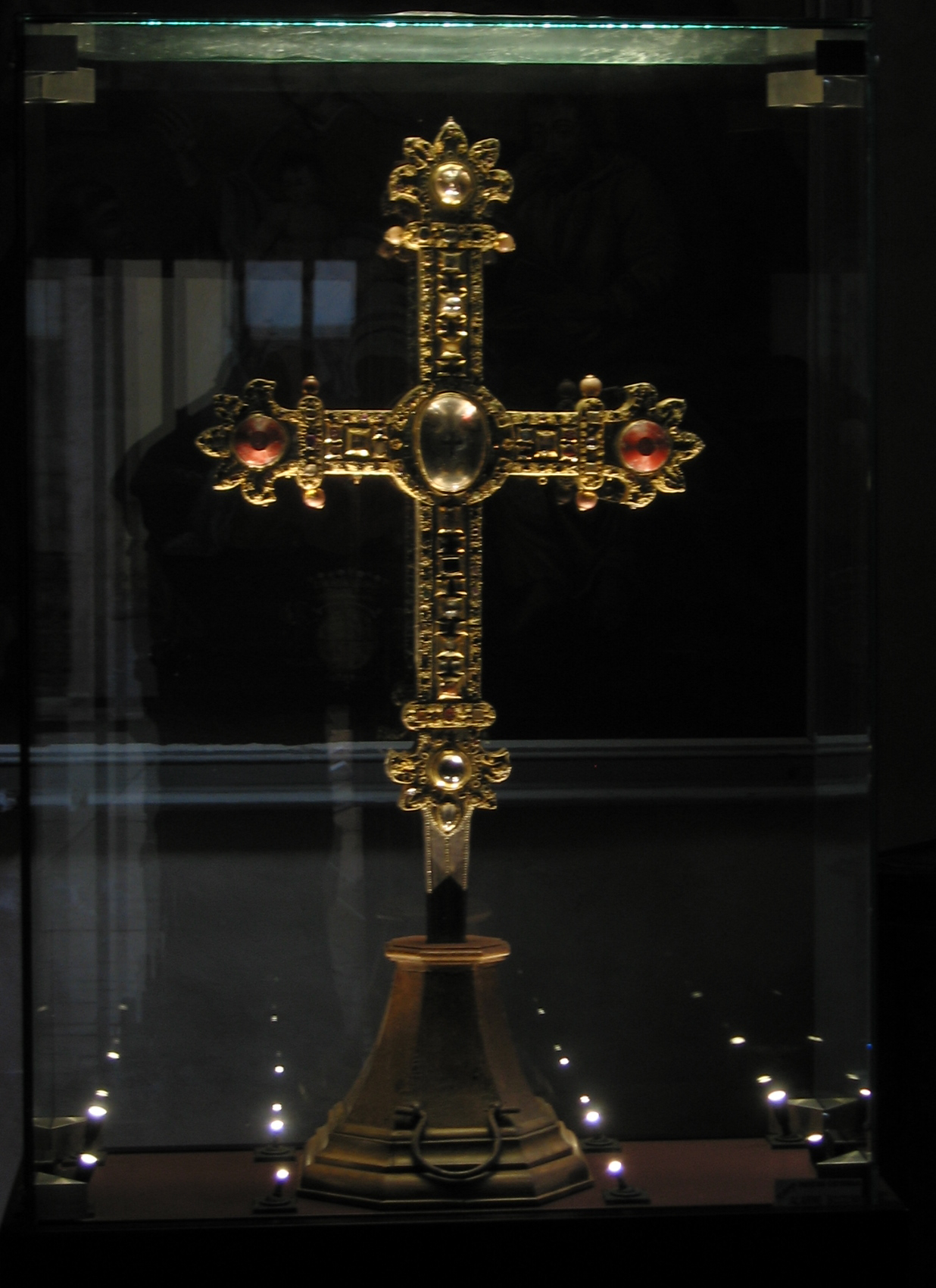
Reliquary cross, early 14th century.

Remarkable sites and monuments in Castelnau-de-Montmiral include :

- the village itself, listed among «Les Plus Beaux Villages de France »
- the central square surrounded by corbel vaults, with an ancient pillory
- the Notre Dame de l’Assomption church, with a 16th-century bell
- ancient stone houses and half-timbered houses
- the ramparts
- the Reliquary cross, created in 1341 by a goldsmith in Albi
- the nearby forest La Grésigne

== Cultural references ==
- Intellectuals Jean-Paul Sartre and Simone de Beauvoir once visited the village. Here are her comments :

“One evening, a small, jolting, overcrowded bus took us to Castelnau-de-Montmiral; it was raining; as we got out on the square surrounded by corbel vaults, Sartre abruptly told that he was fed up with being mad.” ("Un soir, un petit autobus cahotant et bondé nous amena à Castelnau de Montmiral; il pleuvait; en descendant sur la place entourée d’arcades, Sartre me dit abruptement qu’il en avait assez d’être fou.")

- Parts of the Hollywood film The Hundred-Foot Journey was filmed at Durantie, a château, now hotel/apartment/spa resort. It is easily recognizable several times in the film.
- In the American TV series Smallville, Lana Lang’s family comes from Castelnau-de-Montmiral.

== See also ==
- Communes of the Tarn department
- Tourism in Tarn
