= Noailles, Tarn =

Noailles
- Commune
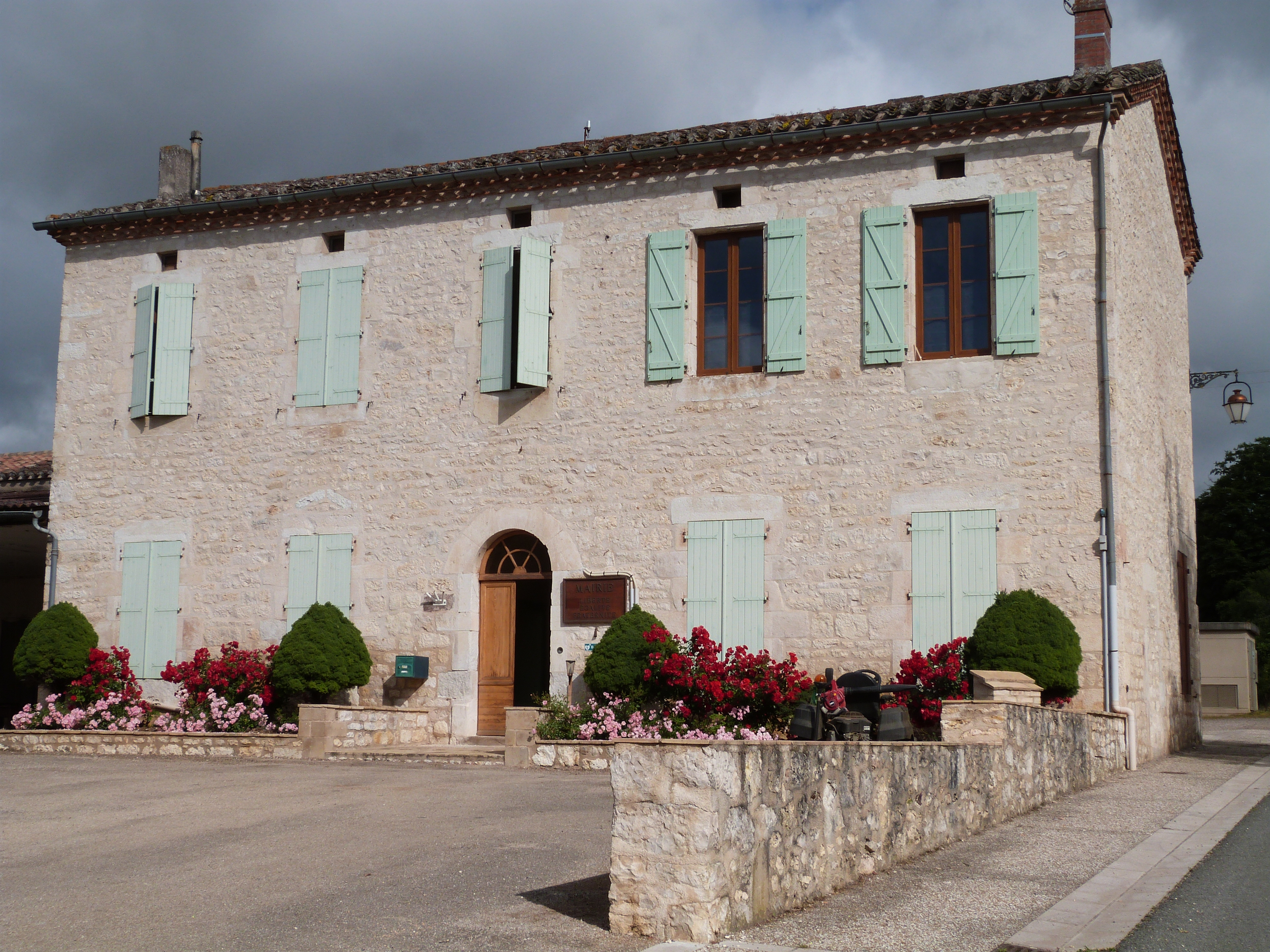
- Noailles Town hall
- Location of Noailles
- Location within France Location within Occitanie
- Coordinates: 44°00′41″N 1°59′08″E
- Country: France
- Region: Occitania
- Department: Tarn
- Arrondissement: Albi
- Canton: Carmaux-2 Vallée du Cérou

Government
  - Mayor (2020–2026): Serge Rouquette
- Area^{1}: 11.59 km^{2} (4.47 sq mi)
- Elevation: 230 m (750 ft)
- Highest elevation: 307 m (1,007 ft)
- Lowest elevation: 210 m (690 ft)
- Population (2023): 205
  - Density: 17.7/km^{2} (45.8/sq mi)
- Time zone: UTC+01:00 (CET)
  - Summer (DST): UTC+02:00 (CEST)
- INSEE/Postal code: 81197 /81170
- ^{1} French Land Register data, which excludes lakes, ponds, glaciers > 1 km^{2} (0.386 sq mi or 247 acres) and river estuaries.

Noailles (Languedocien: Noalhas) is a commune in the Tarn department in southern France.

== Geography ==
The village lies in the middle of the commune, on the right bank of the Vère, which flows southwestward through the commune.

== See also ==
- Communes of the Tarn department
