= Vère =

River in southern France

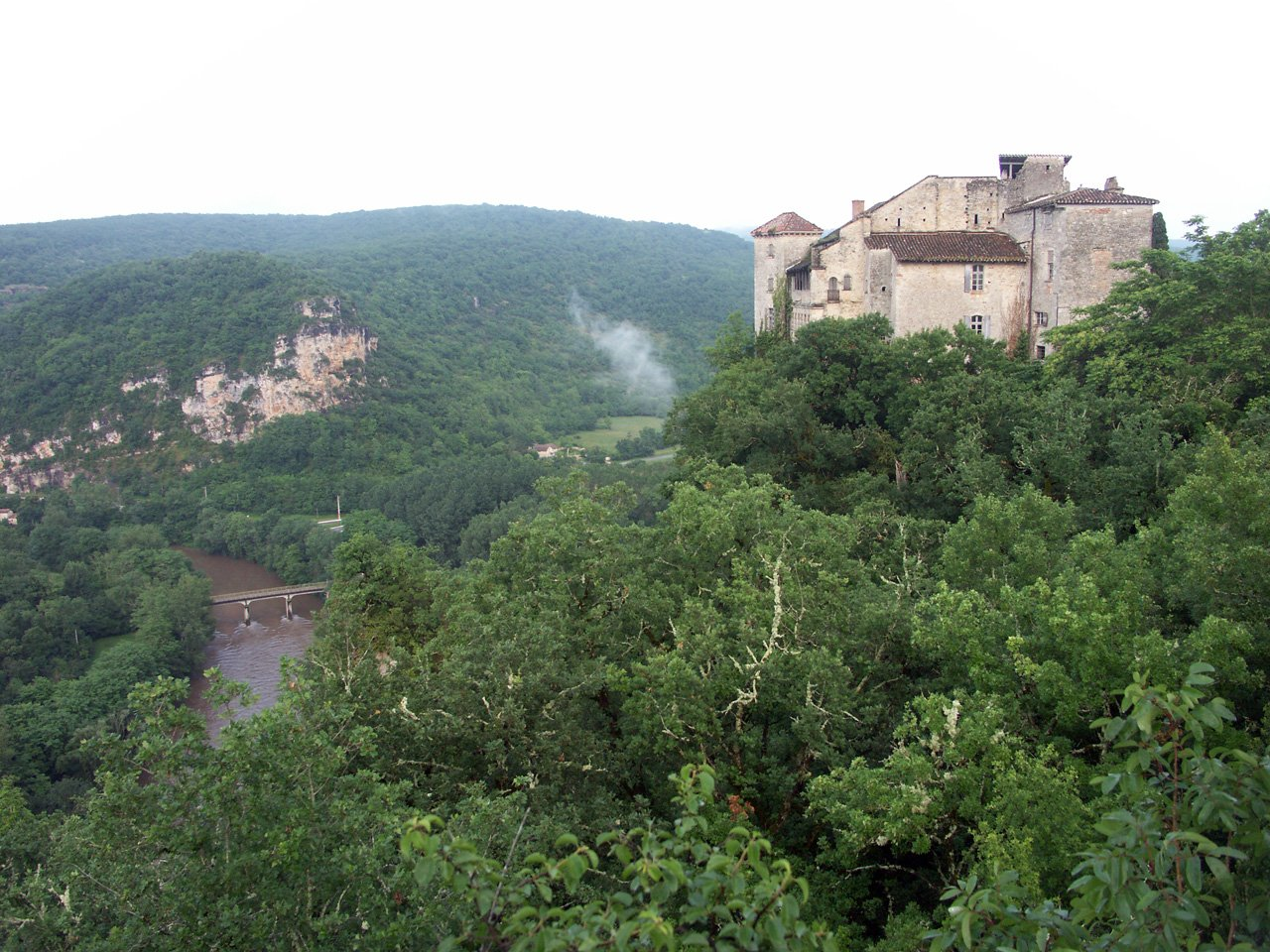

- Location within France Location within Occitanie

Location
- Country: France

Physical characteristics
- Source
  - location: Taïx
  - coordinates: 44°00′19″N 02°08′05″E
  - elevation: 305 m (1,001 ft)
- Mouth
  - location: Aveyron
  - coordinates: 44°03′23″N 01°40′09″E
  - elevation: 95 m (312 ft)
- Length: 53.2 km (33.1 mi)
- Basin size: 311 km^{2} (120 sq mi)
- Discharge
  - average: 2.15 m^{3}/s (76 cu ft/s)

Basin features
- Progression: Aveyron→ Tarn→ Garonne→ Gironde estuary→ Atlantic Ocean

The Vère (French pronunciation: [vɛʁ]; Occitan: Vera) is a 53.2-kilometre-long (33.1 mi) river in the Tarn and Tarn-et-Garonne departments in southern France. Its source is at Taïx. It flows generally west-northwest. It is a left tributary of the Aveyron, into which it flows at Bruniquel.

== Departments and communes along its course ==
This list is ordered from source to mouth:

- Tarn: Taïx, Cagnac-les-Mines, Mailhoc, Villeneuve-sur-Vère, Noailles, Cestayrols, Cahuzac-sur-Vère, Vieux, Le Verdier, Castelnau-de-Montmiral, Sainte-Cécile-du-Cayrou, Puycelci, Larroque
- Tarn-et-Garonne: Bruniquel
