= Haut-Languedoc Regional Nature Park =

Regional natural park in France

Coordinates: 43.5708°N 2.65564°E

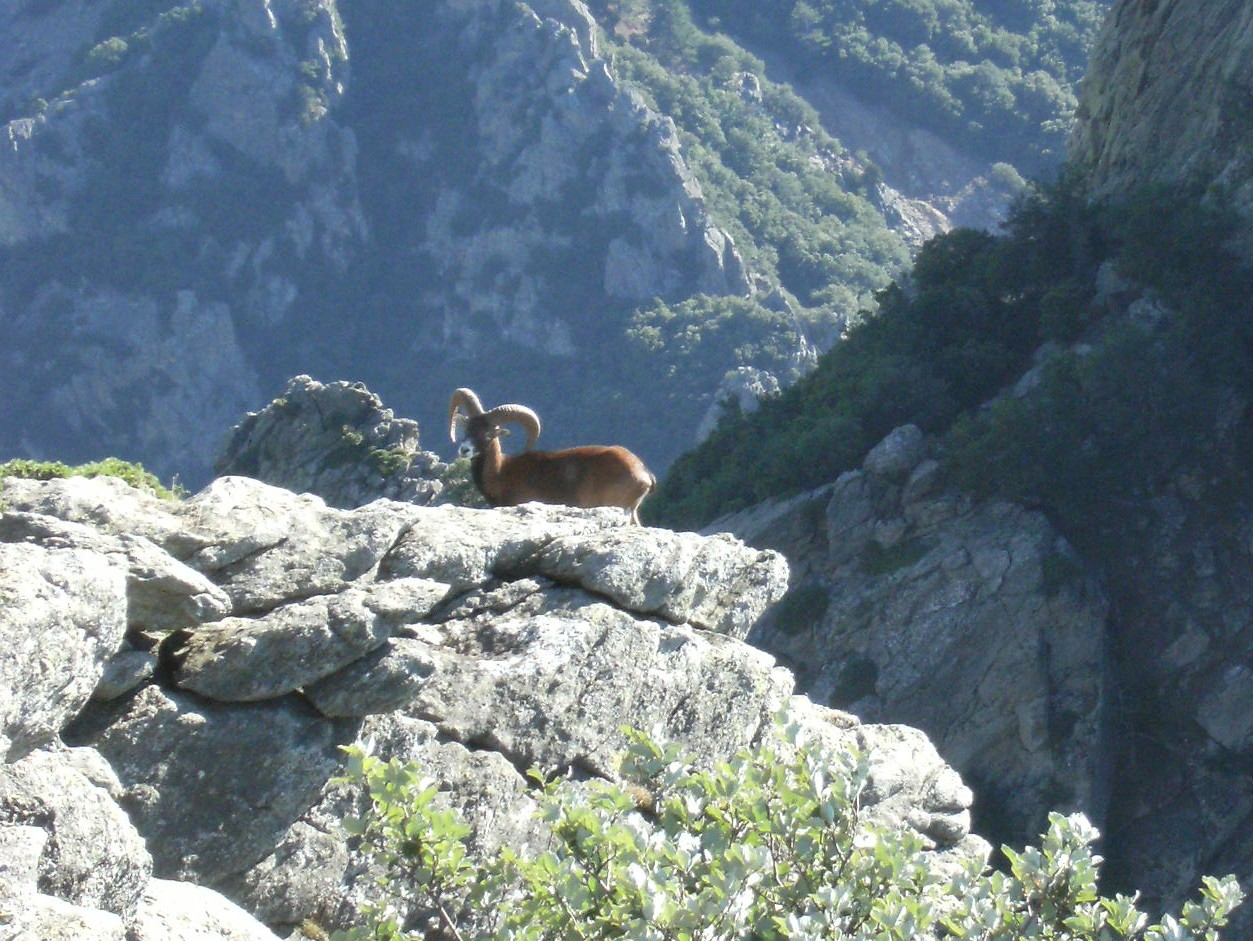
A mouflon in the park.

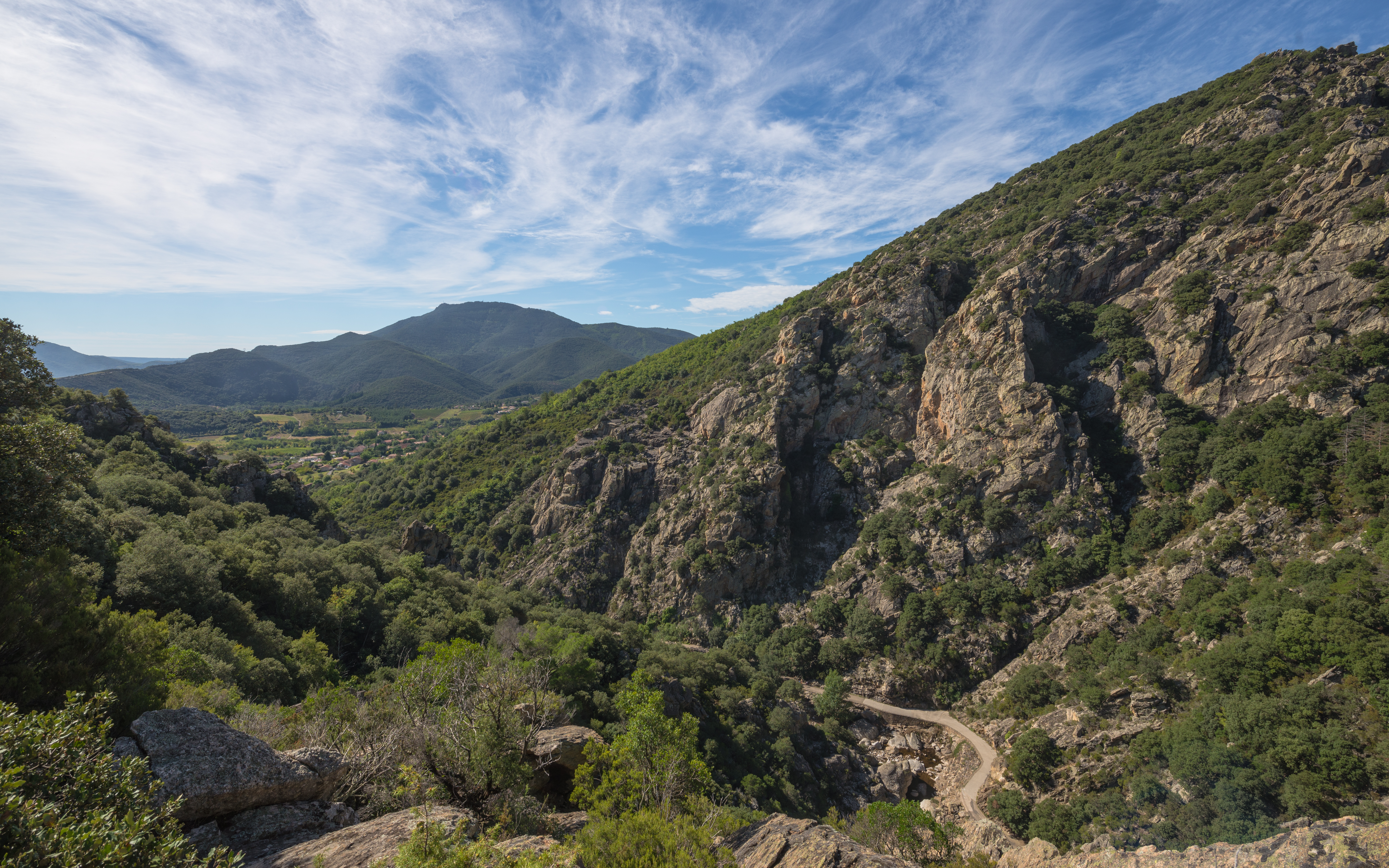
Southern end of the Gorges d'Héric, Mons, Hérault.

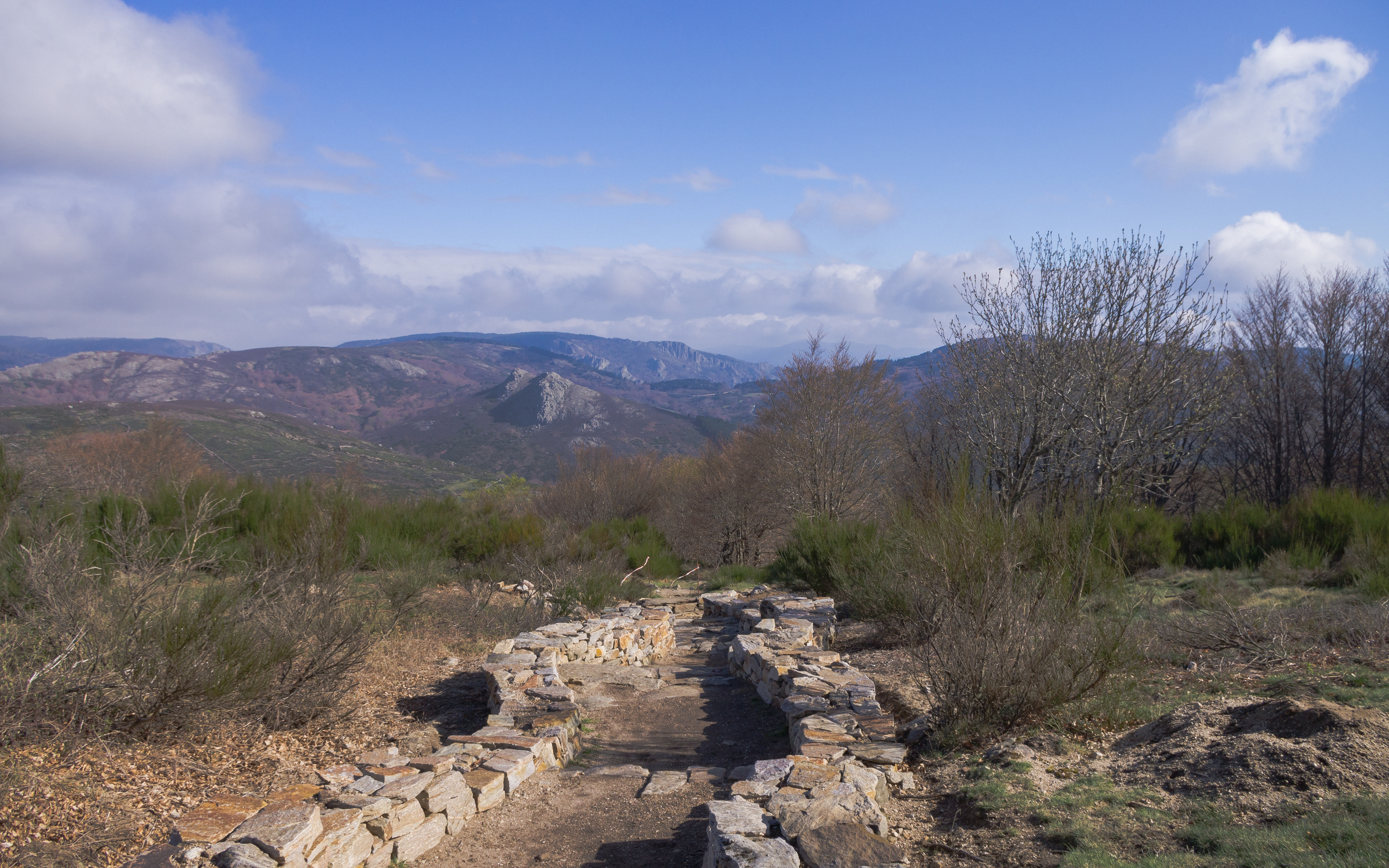
Haut-Languedoc Regional Natural Park, commune of Rosis, Hérault, France.

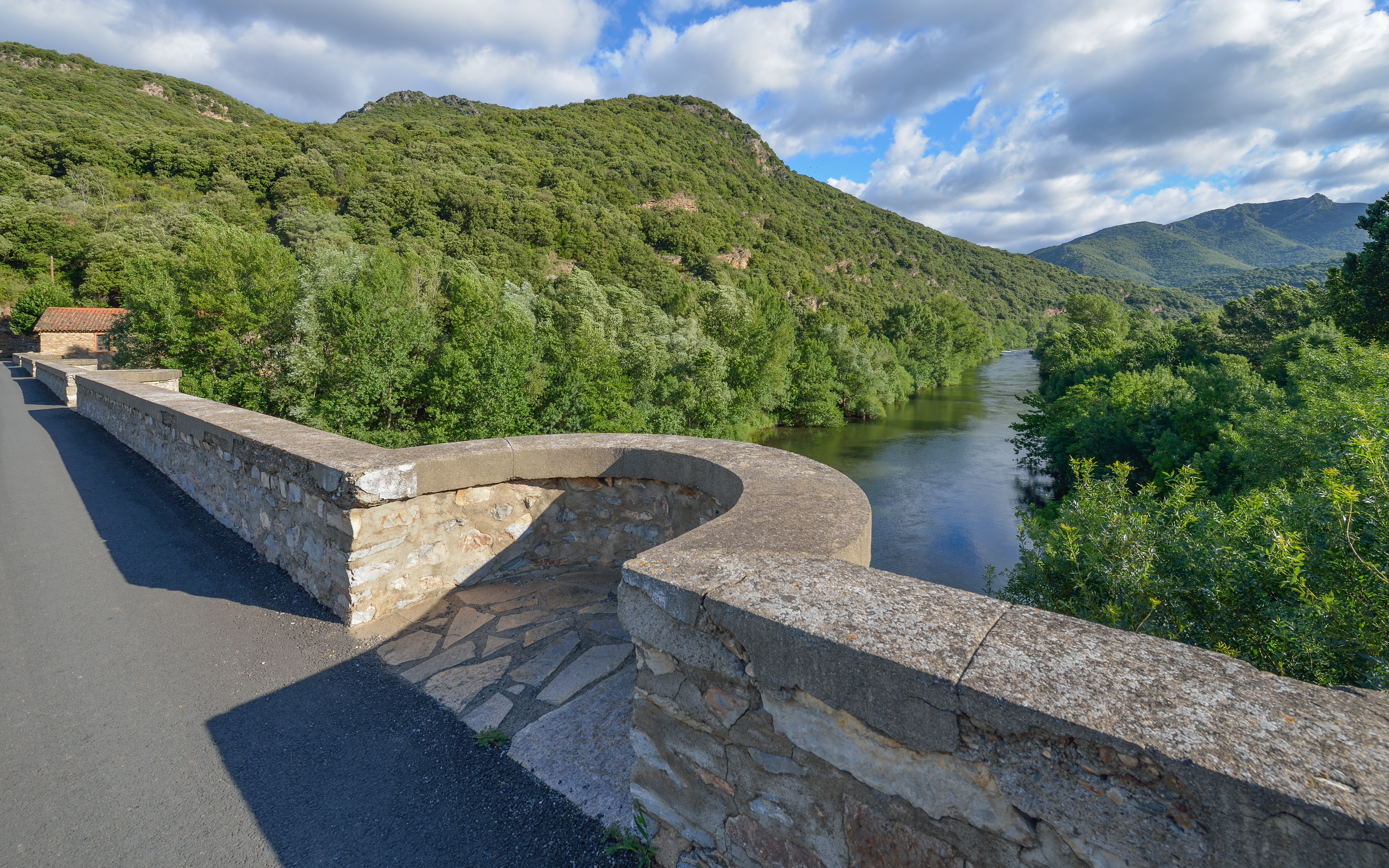
The Orb in the hamlet of Ceps. Roquebrun, Hérault.

Haut-Languedoc Regional Nature Park (French: Parc naturel régional du Haut-Languedoc; Occitan: Parc Natural Regional del Naut-Languedoc) is a regional natural park in the south of the Massif Central within the Aveyron, Hérault, and Tarn departments of France. These areas are considered the Haut-Languedoc, compared to the Bas-Languedoc.

Administered by the Federation of French Regional Nature Parks (French: Fédération des Parcs Naturels Régionaux de France), it was created on 22 October 1973. It has an area of 2,605 km^{2}, with 82,000 people living within its boundaries.

The park (coordinates 43.52898, 2.6984) comprises a very diverse range of landscapes, which is why seven different areas have been officially defined within it:

- Caroux-Espinouse
- Montagne noire
- Monts de Lacaune
- Monts d'Orb
- Plateau des Lacs
- Sidobre
- Vignes et Vallées

The park provides a habitat for more than 240 species of birds, in a stunningly diverse range of climate and scenery. It also provides a home for mouflons, successfully reintroduced from Corsica.
