= Montagne Noire =

Mountain range in central southern France

- Black Mountain
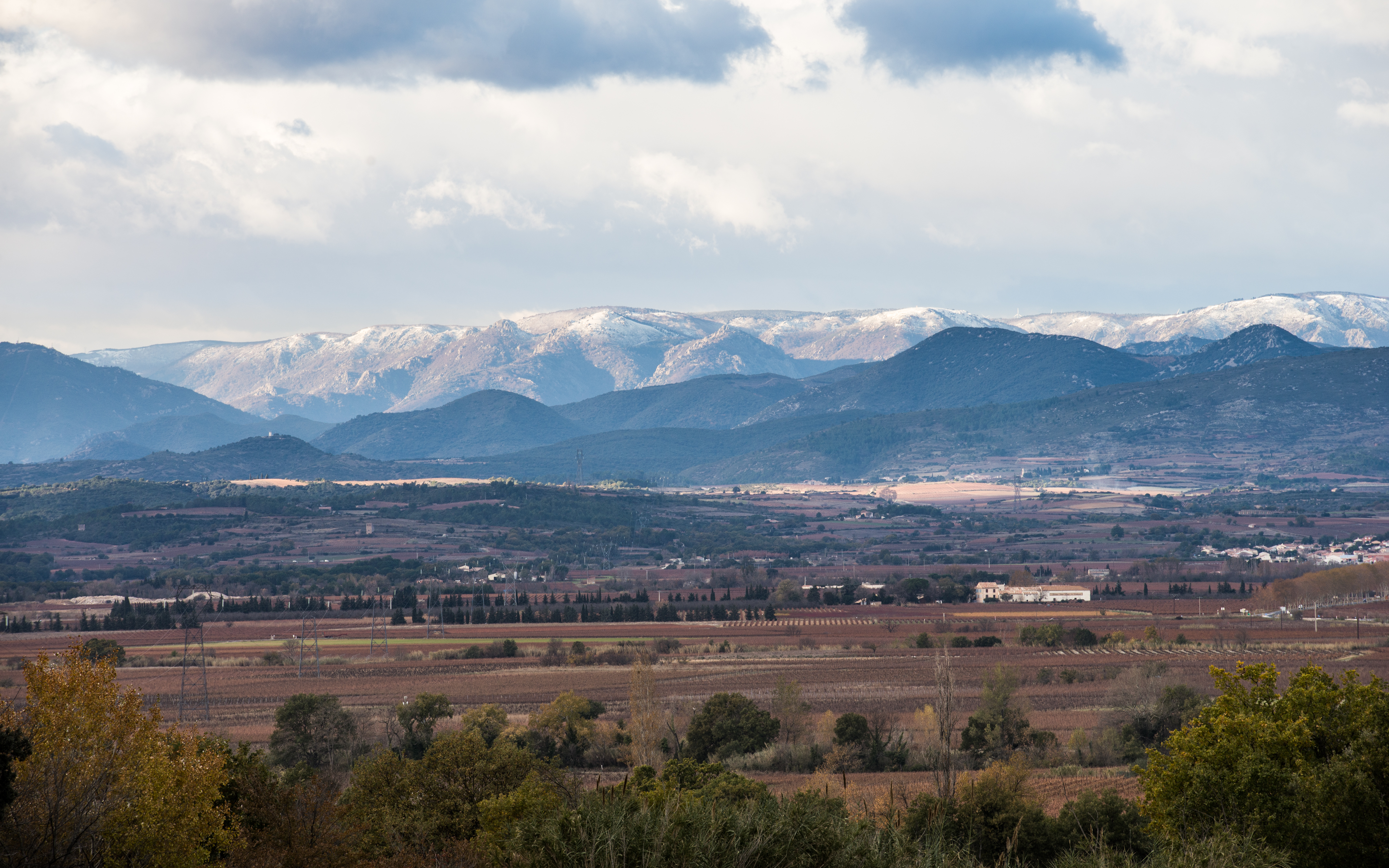
- Montagne Noire in the background, covered in snow, partially obscured by hills

Highest point
- Peak: Pic de Nore
- Elevation: 1,210 m (3,970 ft)

Geography
- Topographic map of the range
- Country: France
- Range coordinates: 43°27′N 02°20′E

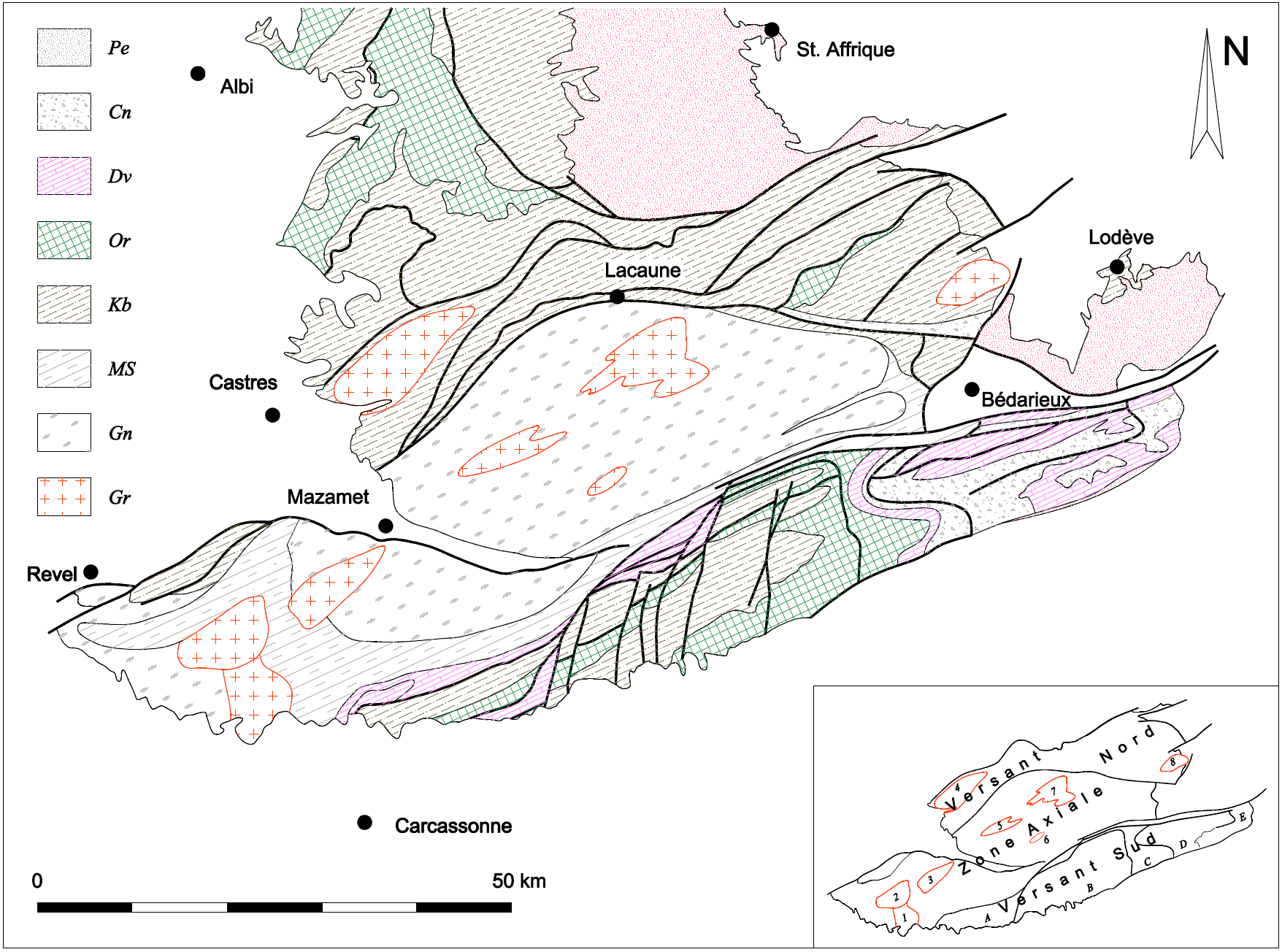
Diagram of the geology of the range. Pe, Cn, Dv, Or, Kb: Permian, Carboniferous, Devonian, Ordovician & Silurian, Cambrian. MS, Gn, Gr: micaschists, gneiss, granite. Bold lines: faults

The Montagne Noire (French pronunciation: [mɔ̃taɲ nwaʁ]; Occitan: Montanha Negra, known as the 'Black Mountain' in English) is a mountain range in central southern France. It is located at the southwestern end of the Massif Central at the juncture of the Tarn, Hérault and Aude departments. Its highest point is the Pic de Nore at 1,210 metres (3,970 ft).

The mountain is within the Haut-Languedoc Regional Nature Park.

The GSSP for the Tournaisian is near the summit of La Serre hill, in the commune of Cabrières, in the Montagne Noire. The GSSP is in a section on the southern side of the hill, in an 80 cm deep trench, about 125 m south of the summit, 2.5 km southwest of the village of Cabrières and 2.5 km north of the hamlet of Fontès.

== Gallery ==
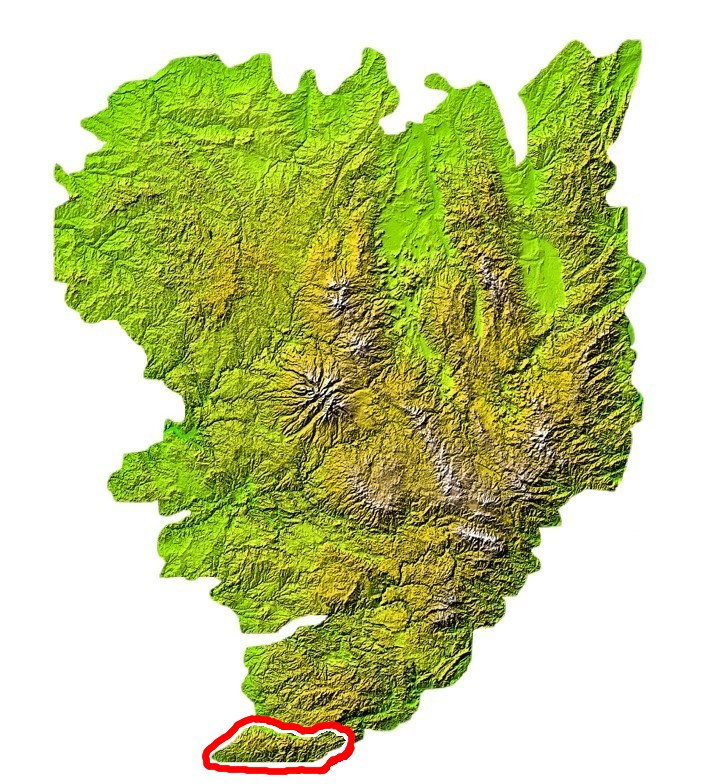
Location in the Massif Central

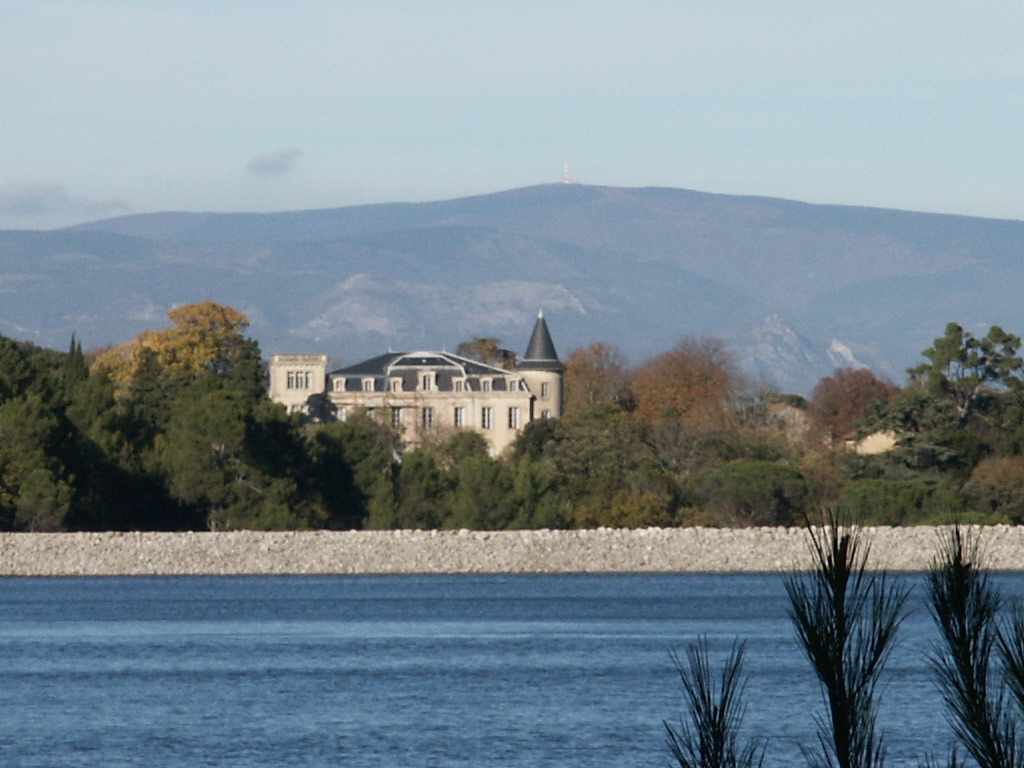
The Pic de Nore, the highest point in the range

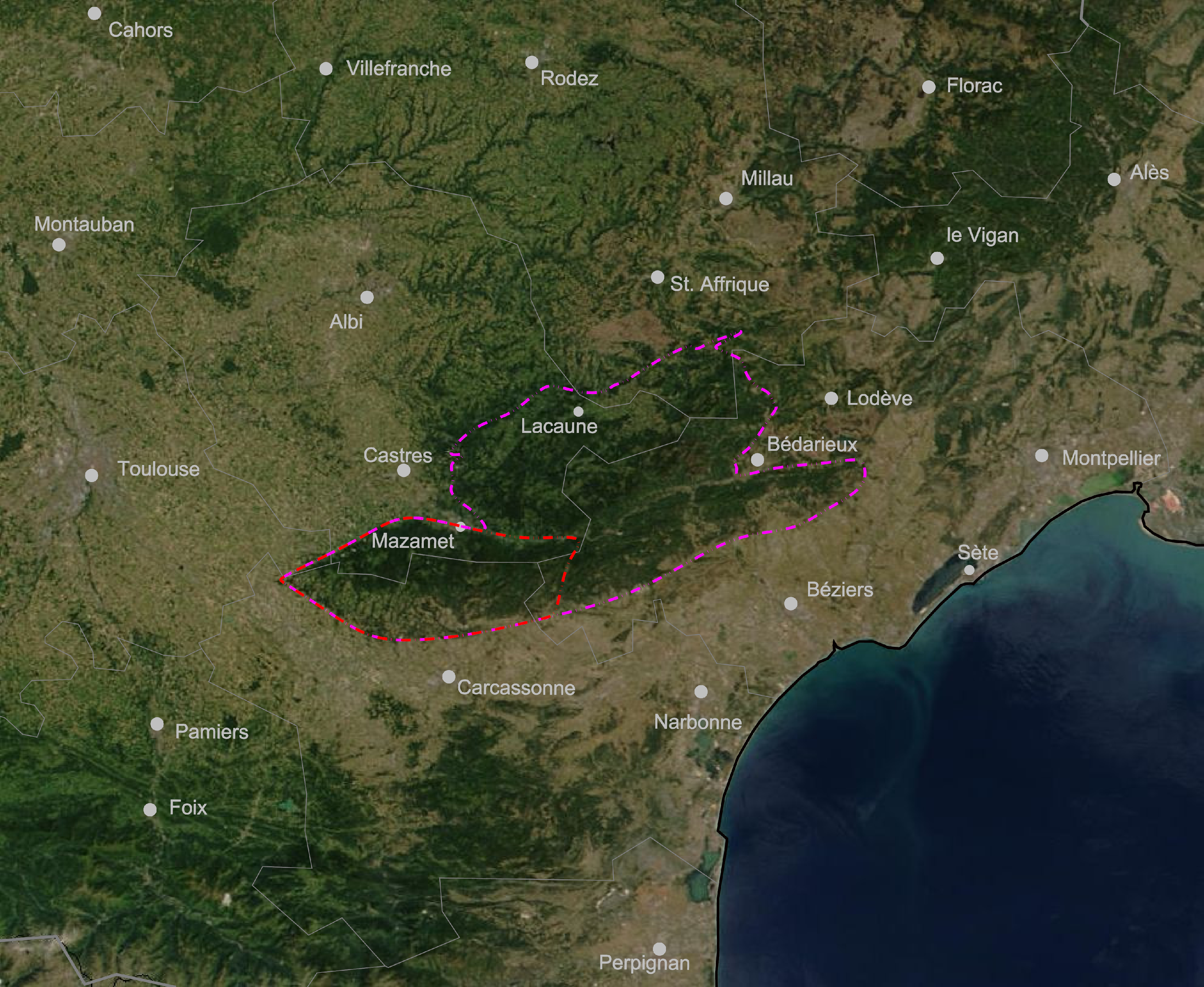
Annotated satellite picture
