= Lagarde =

Lagarde may refer to:

== Places in France ==
- Lagarde, Ariège
- Lagarde, Haute-Garonne
- Lagarde, Gers
- Lagarde, Moselle
- Lagarde, Hautes-Pyrénées
- Lagarde-d'Apt, Vaucluse département
- Lagarde-Enval, Corrèze département
- Lagarde-Hachan, Gers département
- Lagarde-Paréol, Vaucluse département
- Lagarde-sur-le-Né, Charente département

== People ==
- Lagarde (surname), list of people named Lagarde with Wikipedia articles

== Wine ==
- Lagarde (winery), Mendoza, Argentina

== See also ==
- La Garde (disambiguation)
- Legarde (disambiguation)
- Garde (disambiguation)
- Battle of Lagarde (disambiguation)
- LGarde (company)
- Thompson-LaGarde Tests, a series of military tests that led to the adoption of the .45 ACP Cartridge.
