= La Garde =

La Garde may refer to:

== France ==
La Garde or Lagarde is the name or part of the name of several communes:

- La Garde, Alpes-de-Haute-Provence, in the Alpes-de-Haute-Provence département
- La Garde, Isère, in the Isère département
- La Garde, Var, in the Var département
- La Garde-Adhémar, in the Drôme département
- La Garde-Freinet, in the Var département
- Lagarde, Ariège, in the Ariège département
- Lagarde, Gers, in the Gers département
- Lagarde, Haute-Garonne, in the Haute-Garonne département
- Lagarde, Hautes-Pyrénées, in the Hautes-Pyrénées département
- Lagarde, Moselle, in the Moselle département
- Lagarde-d'Apt, in the Vaucluse département
- Lagarde-Enval, in the Corrèze département
- Lagarde-Hachan, in the Gers département
- Lagarde-Paréol, in the Vaucluse département
- Lagarde-sur-le-Né, in the Charente département

== United States ==
- La Garde Township, Minnesota

== Other ==
- La Garde (film), a Canadian drama film

== See also ==
- Lagarde (disambiguation)
- Legarde (disambiguation)
- Garde (disambiguation)
- LGarde (company)
