= Garde =

Garde may refer to:

== Places ==
- Garde, Spain, town and municipality in Navarre, Spain
- Garde, Tibet, village in Tibet
- Gârde, a village in Bistra Commune, Alba County, Romania
- Gärde, an area in the north of Offerdal, Jämtland, Sweden
- Garde, Gotland, a settlement on the Swedish island of Gotland

== Other uses ==
- Garde (name), a surname and given name
- Škoda Garde, 1980s car produced by Škoda Auto

== See also ==
- Bière de Garde, farmhouse beer style from Northern France
- La Garde (disambiguation)
- Lagarde (disambiguation)
- Legarde (disambiguation)
- LGarde (company)
