= L'Isle-Bouzon =

- Commune
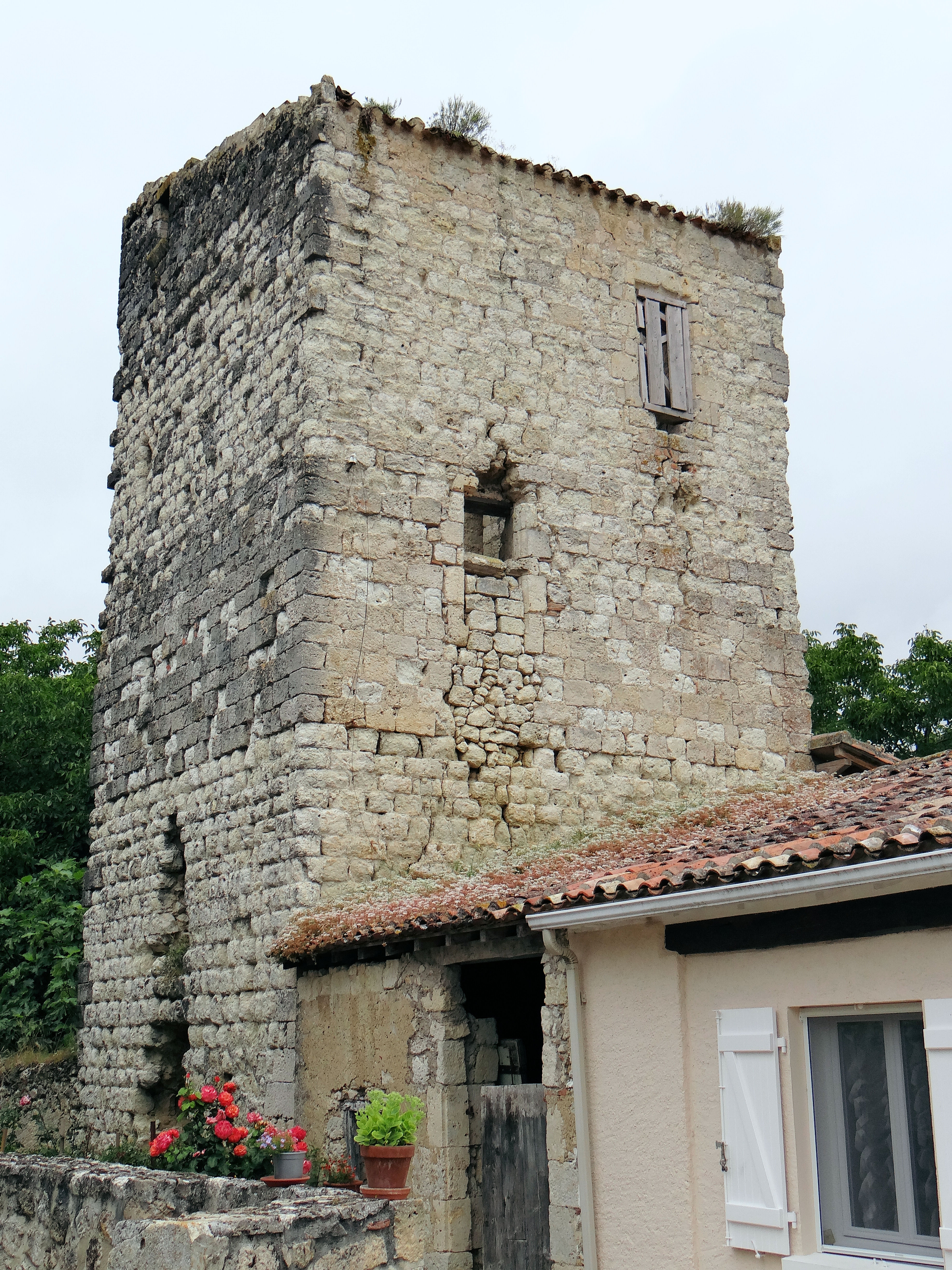
- The old chateau in L'Isle-Bouzon
- Location of L'Isle-Bouzon
- Location within France Location within Occitanie
- Coordinates: 43°55′42″N 0°43′45″E
- Country: France
- Region: Occitania
- Department: Gers
- Arrondissement: Condom
- Canton: Lectoure-Lomagne

Government
  - Mayor (2020–2026): Thierry Begue
- Area^{1}: 15.95 km^{2} (6.16 sq mi)
- Elevation: 168 m (551 ft)
- Highest elevation: 206 m (676 ft)
- Lowest elevation: 85 m (279 ft)
- Population (2023): 252
  - Density: 15.8/km^{2} (40.9/sq mi)
- Time zone: UTC+01:00 (CET)
  - Summer (DST): UTC+02:00 (CEST)
- INSEE/Postal code: 32158 /32380
- ^{1} French Land Register data, which excludes lakes, ponds, glaciers > 1 km^{2} (0.386 sq mi or 247 acres) and river estuaries.

L'Isle-Bouzon (French pronunciation: [lil buzɔ̃]; Occitan: L'Isla Boson) is a commune in the Gers department in southwestern France.

== Geography ==
L'Isle-Bouzon is located in Gascony and borders the Tarn-et-Garonne department.

The village lies above the right bank of the Auroue, which flows north through the western part of the commune. The river Arrats forms all of the commune's eastern border.

The neighboring communes are Gramont, Lectoure, Plieux, Saint-Clar, and Saint-Créac. lies above the right bank of the Auroue, which flows north through the western part of the commune. The river Arrats forms all of the commune's eastern border.

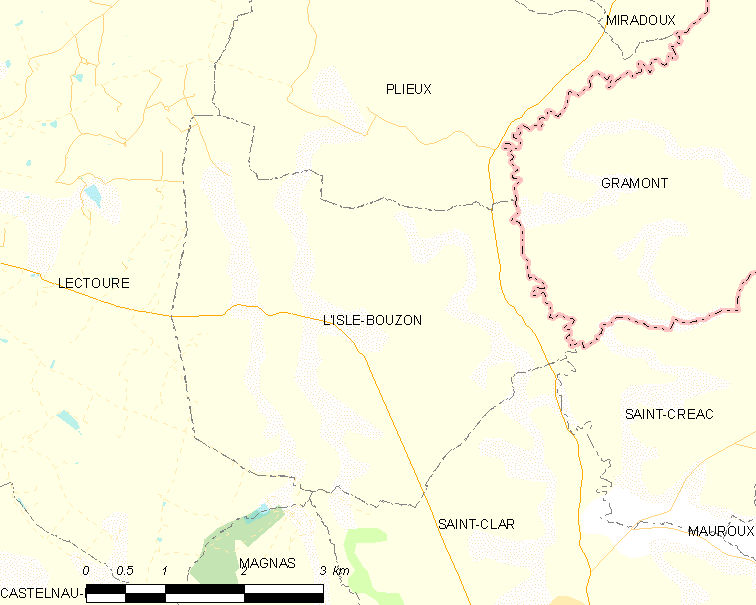
L'Isle-Bouzon and its surrounding communes

=== Climate ===
In 2010, the climate of the commune is classified as a climate of the Southwest Basin, according to a study based on a dataset covering the 1971-2000 period. In 2020, Météo-France published a typology of climates in mainland France in which the commune is exposed to an altered oceanic climate and is part of the Aquitaine, Gascogne climatic region, characterized by abundant rainfall in spring, moderate rainfall in autumn, low sunshine levels in spring, hot summers with 19.5 °C (67 °F), light winds, frequent fog in autumn and winter, and frequent thunderstorms in summer (15 to 20 days).

For the 1971-2000 period, the average annual temperature was 13 °C (55 °F) with an annual atmospheric temperature of 15.8 °C (60 °F). The average annual total rainfall during this period was 754 mm, with 10.3 days of precipitation in January and 6.1 days in July. For the subsequent period of 1991 to 2020, the average annual temperature observed at the nearest weather station, located in the commune of Mauroux, 7 kilometres (4 mi) away as the crow flies, is 14.0 °C (57 °F), and the average annual total rainfall is 677.6 mm.

For the future, climate parameters for the commune projected for 2050, based on different greenhouse gas emission scenarios, can be consulted on a dedicated website published by Météo-France in November 2022.

== Population ==
Historical population
Year	Pop.	±% p.a.
1968	297	—
1975	282	−0.74%
1982	240	−2.28%
1990	230	−0.53%
1999	249	+0.89%
2007	234	−0.77%
2012	250	+1.33%
2017	245	−0.40%
2023	252	+0.47%
Source: INSEE

== See also ==
- Communes of the Gers department
