= Legarde =

Legarde or Le Garde or variant thereof, may refer to:

- Fort Legarde, a star fort in Languedoc-Roussillon, France
- Legarde, a former township in Ontario, Canada
- The LeGarde Twins (born 1931), Tom Legarde and Ted Legarde, Australian musicians
- Christine Lagarde (born 1956), French lawyer, politician, and president of the European Central Bank
- Elias Legarde (1593-1670), aka Legardo, an early Jew in the American Colines

== See also ==
- Garde (disambiguation)
- Lagarde (disambiguation)
- La Garde (disambiguation)
- Legard, a surname
- LGarde, a company
