= Pouy-Roquelaure =

- Commune
- Coat of arms
- Location of Pouy-Roquelaure
- Location within France Location within Occitanie
- Coordinates: 44°02′16″N 0°31′11″E
- Country: France
- Region: Occitania
- Department: Gers
- Arrondissement: Condom
- Canton: Lectoure-Lomagne

Government
  - Mayor (2024–2026): Aurelie Anne Cazaubon
- Area^{1}: 11.04 km^{2} (4.26 sq mi)
- Elevation: 198 m (650 ft)
- Highest elevation: 216 m (709 ft)
- Lowest elevation: 96 m (315 ft)
- Population (2023): 114
  - Density: 10.3/km^{2} (26.7/sq mi)
- Time zone: UTC+01:00 (CET)
  - Summer (DST): UTC+02:00 (CEST)
- INSEE/Postal code: 32328 /32480
- ^{1} French Land Register data, which excludes lakes, ponds, glaciers > 1 km^{2} (0.386 sq mi or 247 acres) and river estuaries.

Pouy-Roquelaure (French pronunciation: [pwi ʁɔkloʁ]; Occitan: Poi e Ròcalaura) is a commune in the Gers department in southwestern France.

== Geography ==
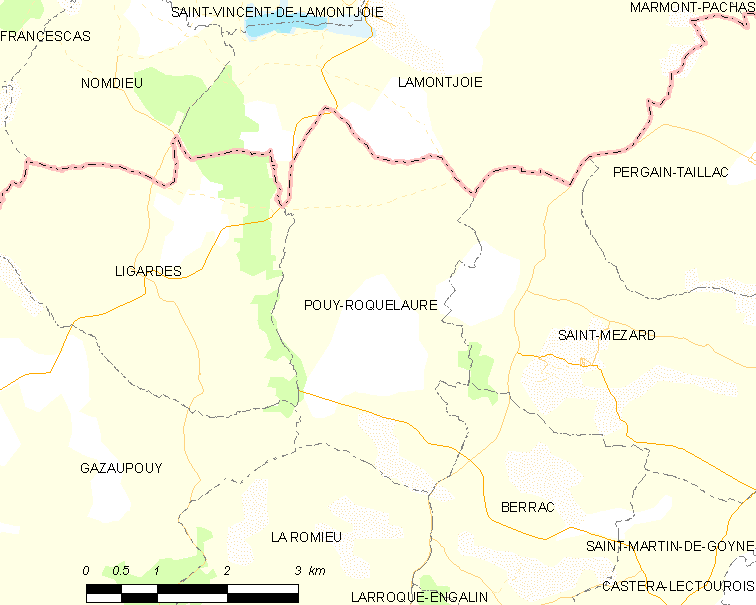
Pouy-Roquelaure and its surrounding communes

== Population ==
Historical population
Year	Pop.	±% p.a.
1968	141	—
1975	128	−1.37%
1982	139	+1.18%
1990	152	+1.12%
1999	137	−1.15%
2007	140	+0.27%
2012	131	−1.32%
2017	122	−1.41%
2023	114	−1.12%
Source: INSEE

== See also ==
- Communes of the Gers department
