= Sempesserre =

- Commune
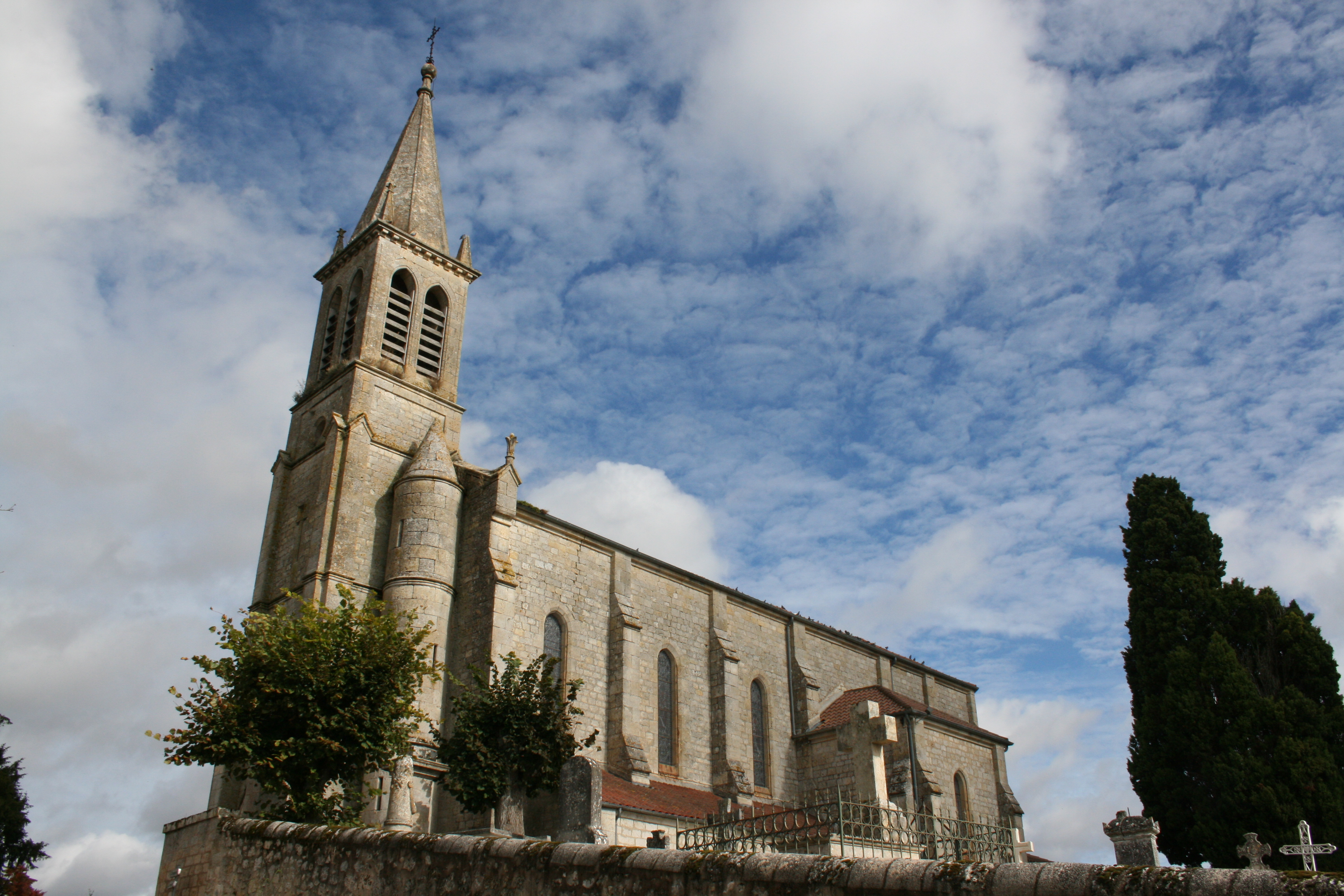
- The church in Sempesserre
- Location of Sempesserre
- Location within France Location within Occitanie
- Coordinates: 44°01′00″N 0°39′00″E
- Country: France
- Region: Occitania
- Department: Gers
- Arrondissement: Condom
- Canton: Lectoure-Lomagne
- Intercommunality: Lomagne Gersoise

Government
  - Mayor (2020–2026): Philippe Blancquart
- Area^{1}: 20.99 km^{2} (8.10 sq mi)
- Elevation: 160 m (520 ft)
- Highest elevation: 210 m (690 ft)
- Lowest elevation: 57 m (187 ft)
- Population (2023): 323
  - Density: 15.4/km^{2} (39.9/sq mi)
- Time zone: UTC+01:00 (CET)
  - Summer (DST): UTC+02:00 (CEST)
- INSEE/Postal code: 32429 /32700
- ^{1} French Land Register data, which excludes lakes, ponds, glaciers > 1 km^{2} (0.386 sq mi or 247 acres) and river estuaries.

Sempesserre (French pronunciation: [sɑ̃pesɛʁ]; Languedocien: Sempessèrra) is a commune in the Gers department in southwestern France.

== Geography ==
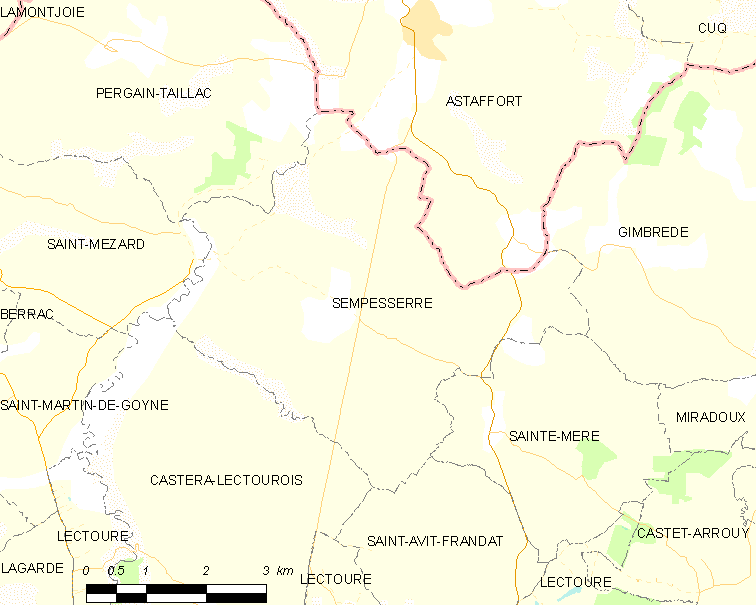
Sempesserre and its surrounding communes

== Population ==
Historical population
Year	Pop.	±% p.a.
1968	355	—
1975	303	−2.24%
1982	296	−0.33%
1990	303	+0.29%
1999	311	+0.29%
2007	296	−0.62%
2012	314	+1.19%
2017	294	−1.31%
2023	323	+1.58%
Source: INSEE

== See also ==
- Communes of the Gers department
