= Saint-Martin-de-Goyne =

- Commune
- Location of Saint-Martin-de-Goyne
- Location within France Location within Occitanie
- Coordinates: 44°00′13″N 0°34′02″E
- Country: France
- Region: Occitania
- Department: Gers
- Arrondissement: Condom
- Canton: Lectoure-Lomagne
- Intercommunality: Lomagne Gersoise

Government
  - Mayor (2020–2026): Alain Dabos
- Area^{1}: 5.6 km^{2} (2.2 sq mi)
- Elevation: 160 m (520 ft)
- Highest elevation: 186 m (610 ft)
- Lowest elevation: 66 m (217 ft)
- Population (2023): 129
  - Density: 23/km^{2} (60/sq mi)
- Time zone: UTC+01:00 (CET)
  - Summer (DST): UTC+02:00 (CEST)
- INSEE/Postal code: 32391 /32480
- ^{1} French Land Register data, which excludes lakes, ponds, glaciers > 1 km^{2} (0.386 sq mi or 247 acres) and river estuaries.

Saint-Martin-de-Goyne (French pronunciation: [sɛ̃ maʁtɛ̃ də gɔjn]; Occitan: Sent Martin de Güeina) is a commune in the Gers département in southwestern France.

== Geography ==
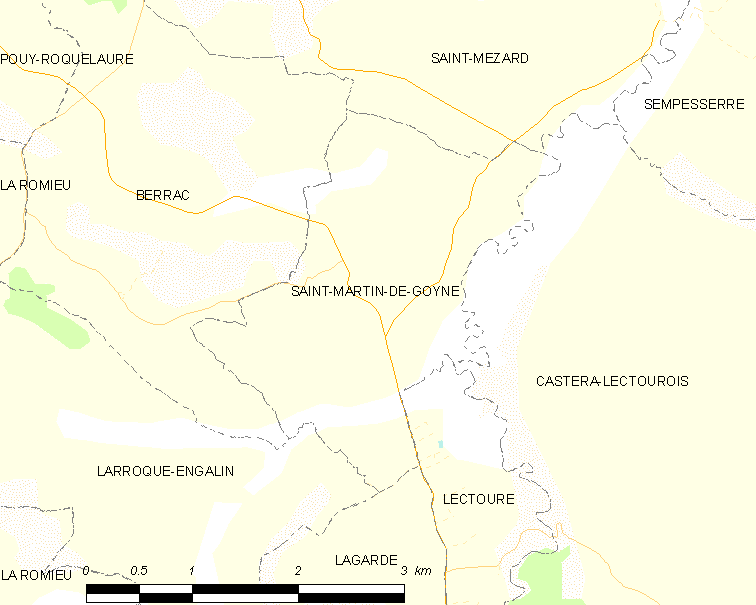
Saint-Martin-de-Goyne and its surrounding communes

== Population ==
Historical population
Year	Pop.	±% p.a.
1968	138	—
1975	147	+0.91%
1982	117	−3.21%
1990	117	+0.00%
1999	109	−0.78%
2007	126	+1.83%
2012	131	+0.78%
2017	126	−0.78%
2023	129	+0.39%
Source: INSEE

== See also ==
- Communes of the Gers department
