= Saint-Antoine, Gers =

Saint-Antoine-sur-l’Arrats
- Commune
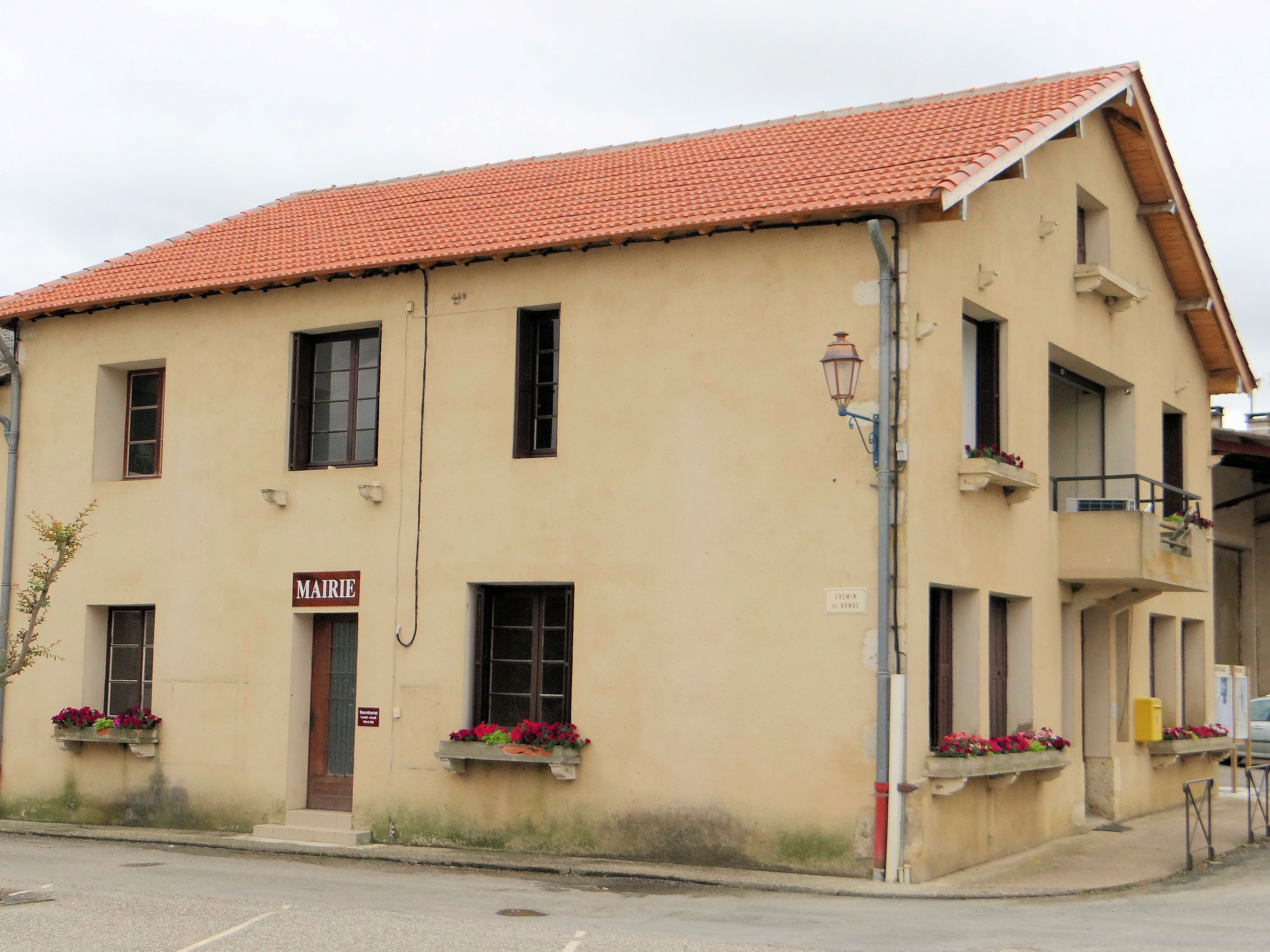
- Town hall

- Coat of arms
- Location of Saint-Antoine-sur-l’Arrats
- Location within France Location within Occitanie
- Coordinates: 44°02′14″N 0°50′28″E
- Country: France
- Region: Occitania
- Department: Gers
- Arrondissement: Condom
- Canton: Lectoure-Lomagne

Government
  - Mayor (2020–2026): Jean Dupuy
- Area^{1}: 9.8 km^{2} (3.8 sq mi)
- Elevation: 144 m (472 ft)
- Highest elevation: 198 m (650 ft)
- Lowest elevation: 64 m (210 ft)
- Population (2023): 194
  - Density: 20/km^{2} (51/sq mi)
- Time zone: UTC+01:00 (CET)
  - Summer (DST): UTC+02:00 (CEST)
- INSEE/Postal code: 32358 /32340
- ^{1} French Land Register data, which excludes lakes, ponds, glaciers > 1 km^{2} (0.386 sq mi or 247 acres) and river estuaries.

Saint-Antoine (French pronunciation: [sɛ̃.t‿ɑ̃twan]; Occitan: Sent Antòni deu Pont d'Arrats) is a commune in the Gers department in southwestern France.

== Geography ==
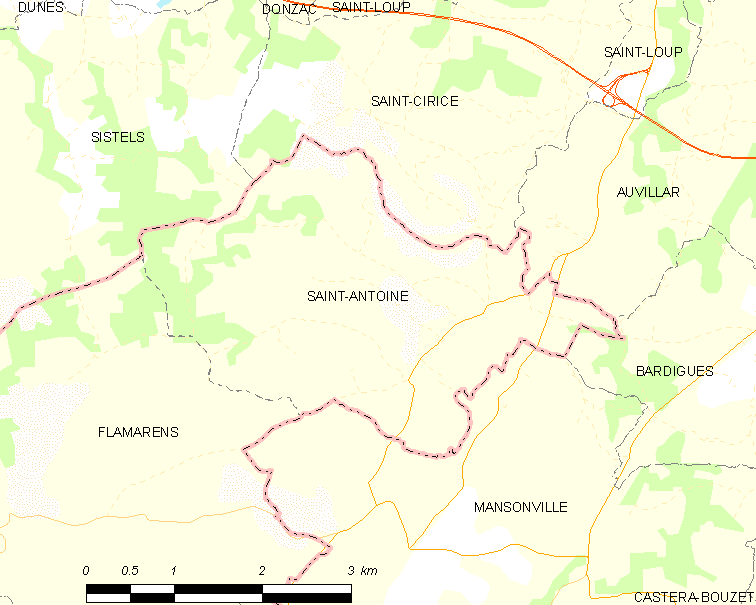
Saint-Antoine and its surrounding communes

== Population ==
Historical population
Year	Pop.	±% p.a.
1968	190	—
1975	155	−2.87%
1982	181	+2.24%
1990	166	−1.08%
1999	174	+0.52%
2007	191	+1.17%
2012	206	+1.52%
2017	198	−0.79%
2023	194	−0.34%
Source: INSEE

== See also ==
- Communes of the Gers department
