= Castéra-Lectourois =

- Commune
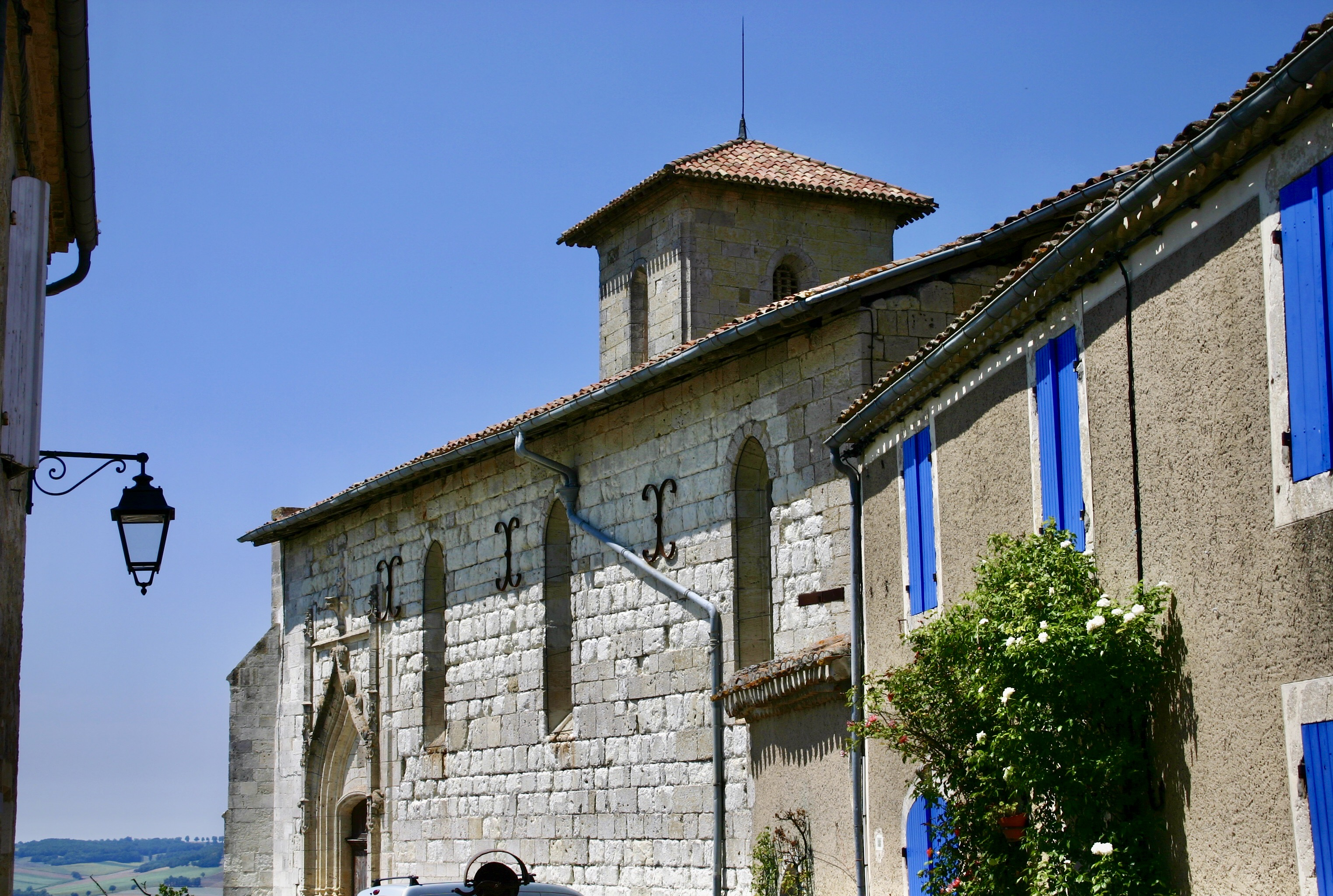
- The church in Castéra-Lectourois
- Location of Castéra-Lectourois
- Location within France Location within Occitanie
- Coordinates: 43°58′35″N 0°36′38″E
- Country: France
- Region: Occitania
- Department: Gers
- Arrondissement: Condom
- Canton: Lectoure-Lomagne
- Intercommunality: Lomagne Gersoise

Government
  - Mayor (2020–2026): Michel Pascau
- Area^{1}: 18.86 km^{2} (7.28 sq mi)
- Elevation: 260 m (850 ft)
- Highest elevation: 203 m (666 ft)
- Lowest elevation: 64 m (210 ft)
- Population (2023): 329
  - Density: 17.4/km^{2} (45.2/sq mi)
- Time zone: UTC+01:00 (CET)
  - Summer (DST): UTC+02:00 (CEST)
- INSEE/Postal code: 32082 /32700
- ^{1} French Land Register data, which excludes lakes, ponds, glaciers > 1 km^{2} (0.386 sq mi or 247 acres) and river estuaries.

Castéra-Lectourois (French pronunciation: [kasteʁa lɛktuʁwa]; Occitan: Lo Casterar Leitorés) is a commune in the Gers department in southwestern France.

== Geography ==
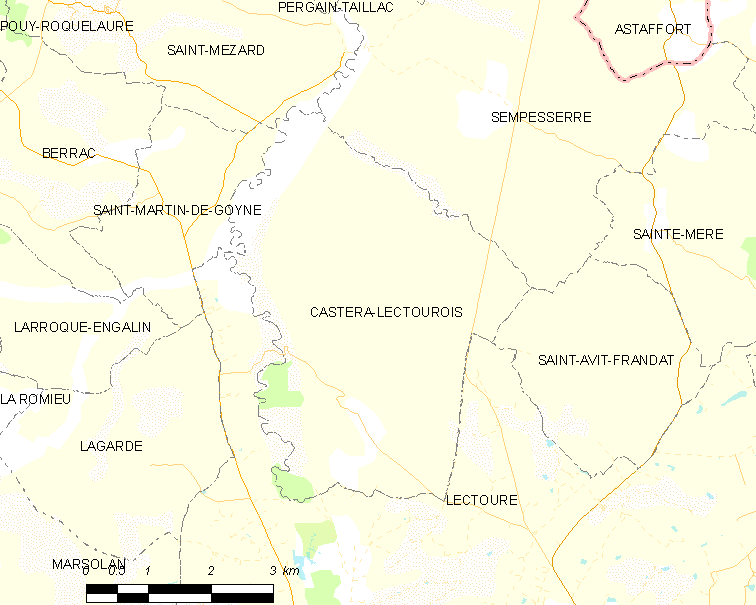
Castéra-Lectourois and its surrounding communes

== Population ==
Historical population
Year	Pop.	±% p.a.
1968	307	—
1975	245	−3.17%
1982	223	−1.34%
1990	241	+0.98%
1999	296	+2.31%
2007	298	+0.08%
2012	325	+1.75%
2017	350	+1.49%
2023	329	−1.03%
Source: INSEE

== See also ==
- Communes of the Gers department
