= Berrac =

- Commune
- Coat of arms
- Location of Berrac
- Location within France Location within Occitanie
- Coordinates: 44°00′49″N 0°33′02″E
- Country: France
- Region: Occitania
- Department: Gers
- Arrondissement: Condom
- Canton: Lectoure-Lomagne
- Intercommunality: Lomagne Gersoise

Government
  - Mayor (2020–2026): Philippe Augustin
- Area^{1}: 7.99 km^{2} (3.08 sq mi)
- Elevation: 187 m (614 ft)
- Highest elevation: 207 m (679 ft)
- Lowest elevation: 73 m (240 ft)
- Population (2023): 110
  - Density: 14/km^{2} (36/sq mi)
- Time zone: UTC+01:00 (CET)
  - Summer (DST): UTC+02:00 (CEST)
- INSEE/Postal code: 32047 /32480
- ^{1} French Land Register data, which excludes lakes, ponds, glaciers > 1 km^{2} (0.386 sq mi or 247 acres) and river estuaries.

Berrac (French pronunciation: [bɛʁak]) is a commune in the Gers department in southwestern France.

== Geography ==
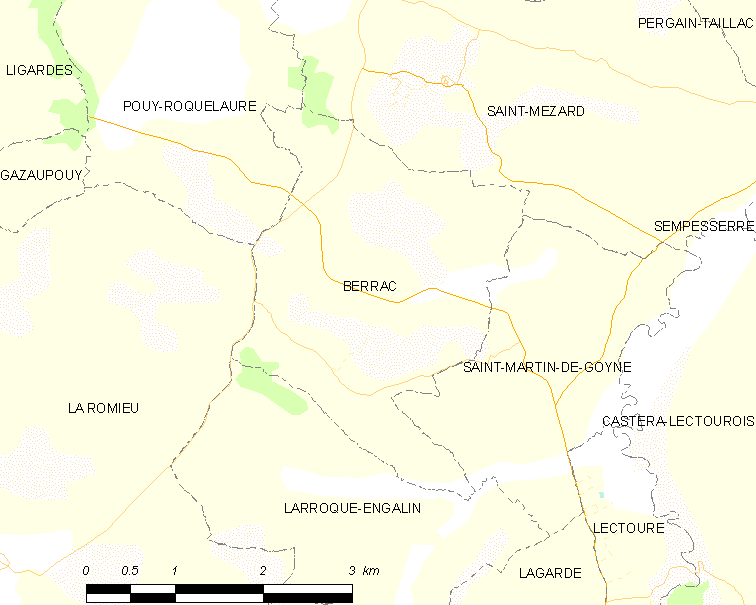
Berrac and its surrounding communes

== Population ==
Historical population
Year	Pop.	±% p.a.
1968	128	—
1975	102	−3.19%
1982	90	−1.77%
1990	101	+1.45%
1999	90	−1.27%
2007	94	+0.55%
2012	106	+2.43%
2017	103	−0.57%
2023	110	+1.10%
Source: INSEE

== Events ==
The town festival is held the second weekend in August.

== See also ==
- Communes of the Gers department
