= Gimbrède =

- Commune
- Location of Gimbrède
- Location within France Location within Occitanie
- Coordinates: 44°02′27″N 0°43′10″E
- Country: France
- Region: Occitania
- Department: Gers
- Arrondissement: Condom
- Canton: Lectoure-Lomagne

Government
  - Mayor (2020–2026): Florence Chebassier
- Area^{1}: 24.98 km^{2} (9.64 sq mi)
- Elevation: 110 m (360 ft)
- Highest elevation: 221 m (725 ft)
- Lowest elevation: 72 m (236 ft)
- Population (2023): 295
  - Density: 11.8/km^{2} (30.6/sq mi)
- Time zone: UTC+01:00 (CET)
  - Summer (DST): UTC+02:00 (CEST)
- INSEE/Postal code: 32146 /32340
- ^{1} French Land Register data, which excludes lakes, ponds, glaciers > 1 km^{2} (0.386 sq mi or 247 acres) and river estuaries.

Gimbrède (French pronunciation: [ʒɛ̃bʁɛd]) is a commune in the Gers department in southwestern France.

== Geography ==
The river Auroue forms all of the commune's southeastern border, then flows north through its eastern part.

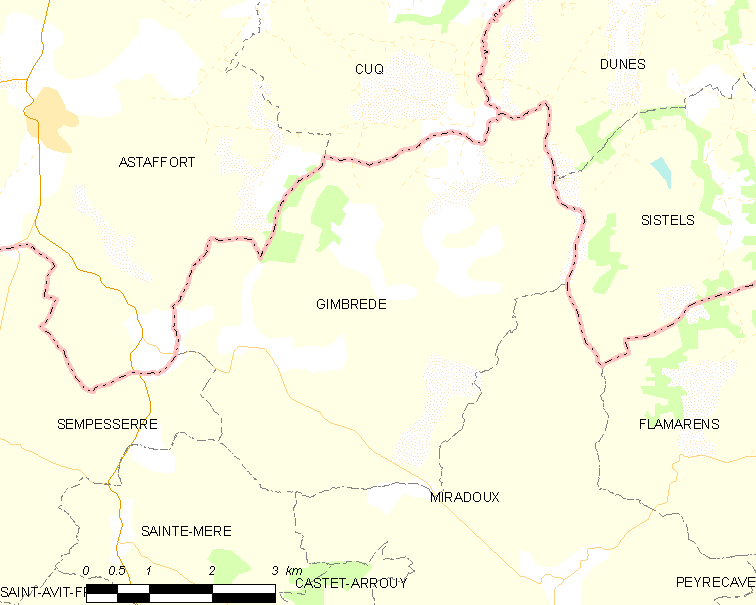
Gimbrède and its surrounding communes

== Population ==
Historical population
Year	Pop.	±% p.a.
1968	365	—
1975	315	−2.08%
1982	292	−1.08%
1990	285	−0.30%
1999	287	+0.08%
2007	321	+1.41%
2012	317	−0.25%
2017	283	−2.24%
2023	295	+0.69%
Source: INSEE

== See also ==
- Communes of the Gers department
