= Legard =

Legard may refer to:

- Alfred Legard (1878–1939), English soldier and cricketer
- Antony Legard (1912–2004), English cricketer
- Eddie Legard (born 1935), English cricketer
- Sir John Legard, 1st Baronet (1631–1678), English politician
- Jonathan Legard (born 1961), English broadcaster
- Percy Legard (1906–1980), English soldier and Olympic sportsman

See also:

- Legard Baronets
