= Lagarde (surname) =

Lagarde is a French surname. Notable people with the surname include:

- Alfred Lagarde (1948–1998), Dutch voice actor
- Céline Laguarde (1873–1961), French photographer, a member of the Pictorialist movement
- Charles Lagarde (1878–?), French Olympic athlete
- Christine Lagarde (born 1956), French politician, current President of the European Central Bank and former Managing Director of the IMF
- Claude Lagarde (1895–1983), French Olympic shooter
- Claude François Chauveau-Lagarde (1756–1841), French lawyer and political figure
- Jean-Christophe Lagarde (born 1967), French political figure
- Jocelyne LaGarde (1924–1979), Tahiti-born Hawaiian personality, noted for appearance in 1966 film Hawaii
- Karloff Lagarde (1928–2007), Mexican athlete in professional wrestling
- Karloff Lagarde, Jr. (1970–2024), Mexican athlete in professional wrestling
- Léonce Lagarde (1860–1936), French political figure
- Maurice L. Lagarde (f. 2000s), US businessman
- Maxime Lagarde (born 1994), French chess grandmaster
- Paul Lagarde (1891–?), French Olympic pole vaulter
- Paul de Lagarde (1827–1891), German scientist and academician
- Tom LaGarde (born 1955), American basketball player
