= Ligardes =

- Commune
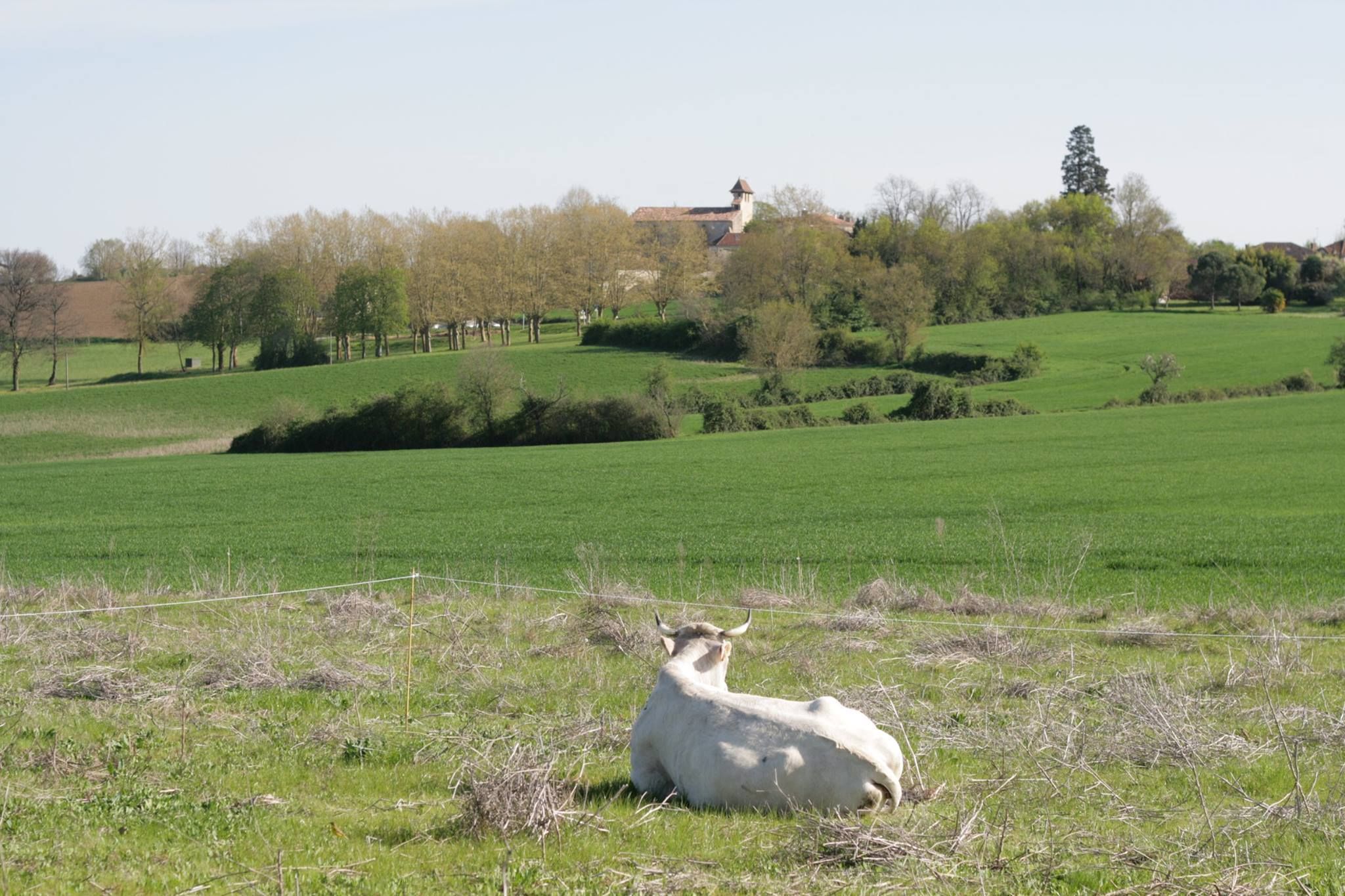
- Cattle and a general view of Ligardes
- Location of Ligardes
- Location within France Location within Occitanie
- Coordinates: 44°02′29″N 0°29′00″E
- Country: France
- Region: Occitania
- Department: Gers
- Arrondissement: Condom
- Canton: Lectoure-Lomagne
- Intercommunality: Ténarèze

Government
  - Mayor (2020–2026): Pierre Dulong
- Area^{1}: 11.3 km^{2} (4.4 sq mi)
- Elevation: 200 m (660 ft)
- Highest elevation: 182 m (597 ft)
- Lowest elevation: 77 m (253 ft)
- Population (2023): 208
  - Density: 18.4/km^{2} (47.7/sq mi)
- Demonym(s): Ligardais, Ligardaises
- Time zone: UTC+01:00 (CET)
  - Summer (DST): UTC+02:00 (CEST)
- INSEE/Postal code: 32212 /32480
- ^{1} French Land Register data, which excludes lakes, ponds, glaciers > 1 km^{2} (0.386 sq mi or 247 acres) and river estuaries.

Ligardes (French pronunciation: [liɡaʁd]; Occitan: Ligardas) is a commune in the Gers department in southwestern France.

== Geography ==
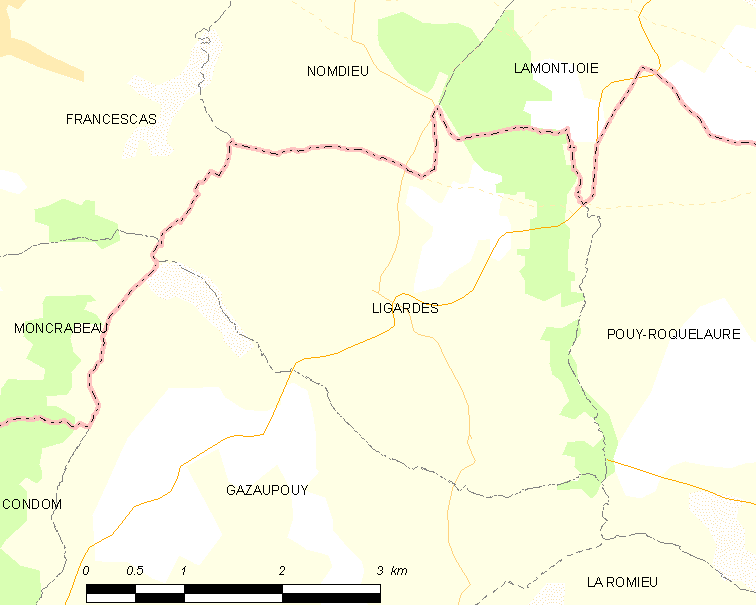
Ligardes and its surrounding communes

== Population ==
Historical population
Year	Pop.	±% p.a.
1968	280	—
1975	247	−1.78%
1982	261	+0.79%
1990	269	+0.38%
1999	250	−0.81%
2007	237	−0.67%
2012	218	−1.66%
2017	217	−0.09%
2023	208	−0.70%
Source: INSEE

== See also ==
- Communes of the Gers department
