= Saint-Mézard =

- Commune
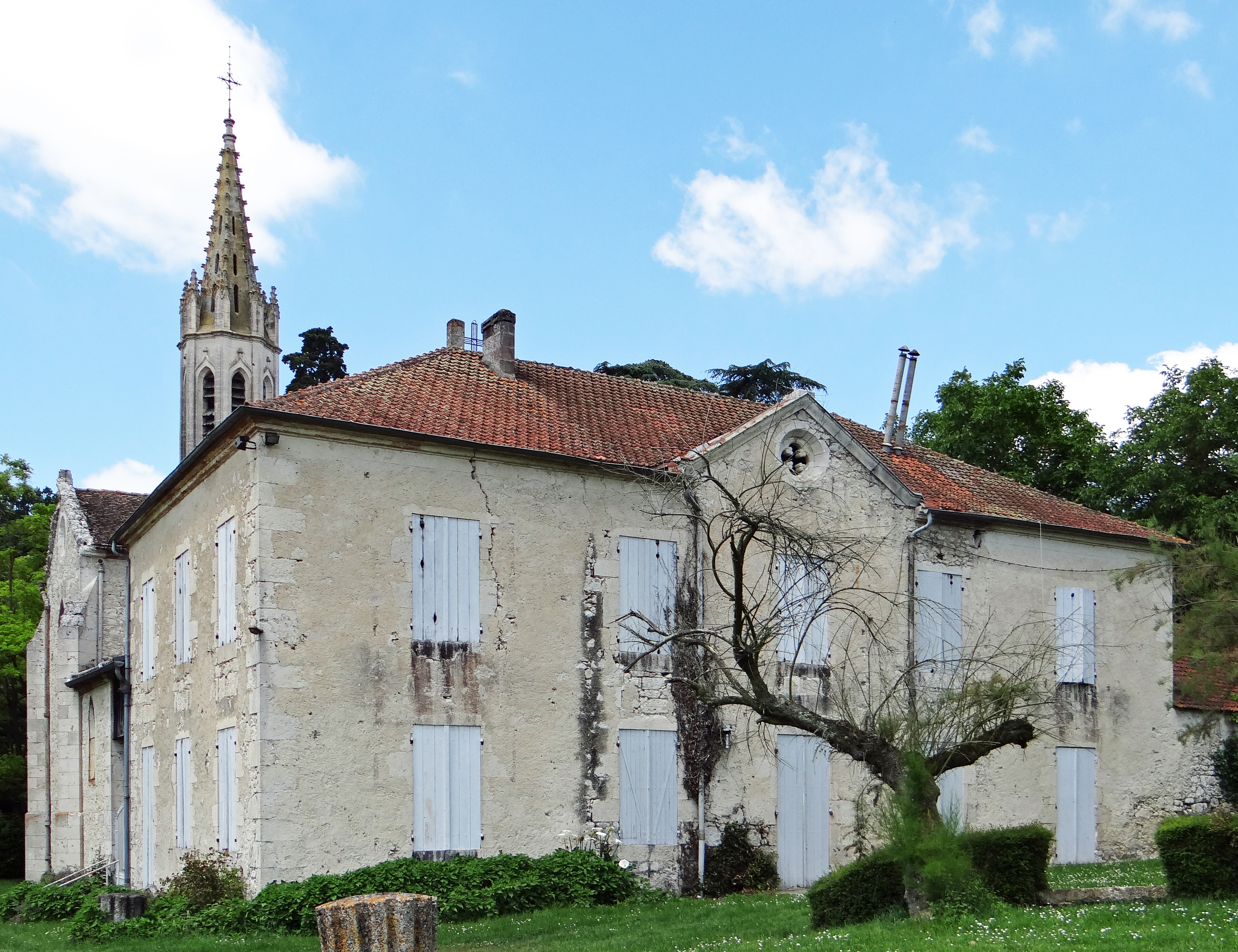
- The church in Saint-Mézard
- Location of Saint-Mézard
- Location within France Location within Occitanie
- Coordinates: 44°01′59″N 0°33′36″E
- Country: France
- Region: Occitania
- Department: Gers
- Arrondissement: Condom
- Canton: Lectoure-Lomagne
- Intercommunality: Lomagne Gersoise

Government
  - Mayor (2022–2026): Vincent Zambonini
- Area^{1}: 15.11 km^{2} (5.83 sq mi)
- Elevation: 180 m (590 ft)
- Highest elevation: 222 m (728 ft)
- Lowest elevation: 62 m (203 ft)
- Population (2023): 240
  - Density: 16/km^{2} (41/sq mi)
- Time zone: UTC+01:00 (CET)
  - Summer (DST): UTC+02:00 (CEST)
- INSEE/Postal code: 32396 /32700
- ^{1} French Land Register data, which excludes lakes, ponds, glaciers > 1 km^{2} (0.386 sq mi or 247 acres) and river estuaries.

Saint-Mézard (French pronunciation: [sɛ̃ mezaʁ]; Occitan: Sent Mesard) is a commune in the Gers department in southwestern France.

== Geography ==
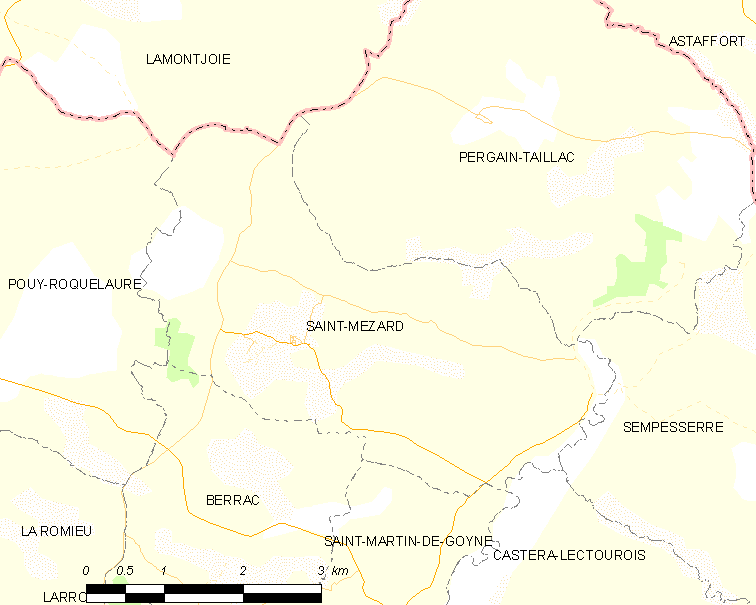
Saint-Mézard and its surrounding communes

== Population ==
Historical population
Year	Pop.	±% p.a.
1968	314	—
1975	251	−3.15%
1982	236	−0.88%
1990	238	+0.11%
1999	202	−1.81%
2007	204	+0.12%
2012	215	+1.06%
2017	225	+0.91%
2023	240	+1.08%
Source: INSEE

== See also ==
- Communes of the Gers department
