= Château de Lagarde =

Ruined castle near the village of Lagarde in the French département of Ariège

Coordinates: 43°3′2″N 1°56′8.5″E

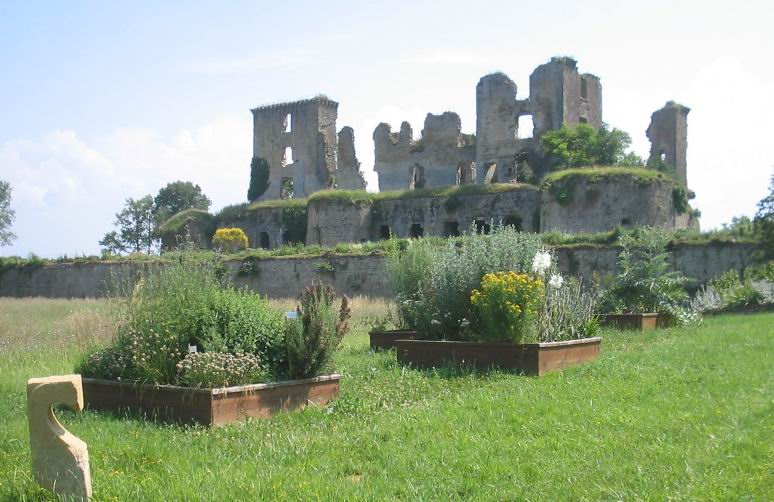

The Château de Lagarde is a ruined castle situated near the village of Lagarde, 8 km (5 mi) southeast of Mirepoix in the French département of Ariège.

Following the Albigensian Crusade, the castle was handed to the Lévis-Mirepoix family. It was fortified but, over time, it was modified to provide a more comfortable residence. During the French Revolution, the castle was partially destroyed, but it remains today as a bold silhouette looking down over the valley. The ruins comprise several towers and curtain walls.

Château de Lagarde has been listed as a monument historique by the French Ministry of Culture since 1914.

== History ==
The first documented mention of Lagarde is from the 10th century. The first castle was a square tower with, in the corner, a circular covering tower, built in the 11th century. In the 12th century, four square towers were added as well as a rectangular gatehouse, the whole castle being linked by walls with arrowslits and crenellations. In the 14th century, the structure underwent important alterations. Buildings were erected behind each façade, the roofs were raised, a drawbridge was built and the entry gate and building openings were modified. In the 16th century, a large hanging spiral staircase was built (1526) with a flamboyant Gothic vault. Also in this period, the castle was doubled in size with the addition of walls and vaults, a new moat was created with four circular bastions in the corners and the drawbridge entrance was also bastioned. 17th century modifications included the addition of monumental statues on the bastions and the staircase tower, the creation of an esplanade surrounded by fortifications in the southeast, the replacement of the drawbridge by a stone bridge with a monumental gateway, and an access ramp leading from the village.

== See also ==
- List of castles in France
