= Peyrecave =

- Commune
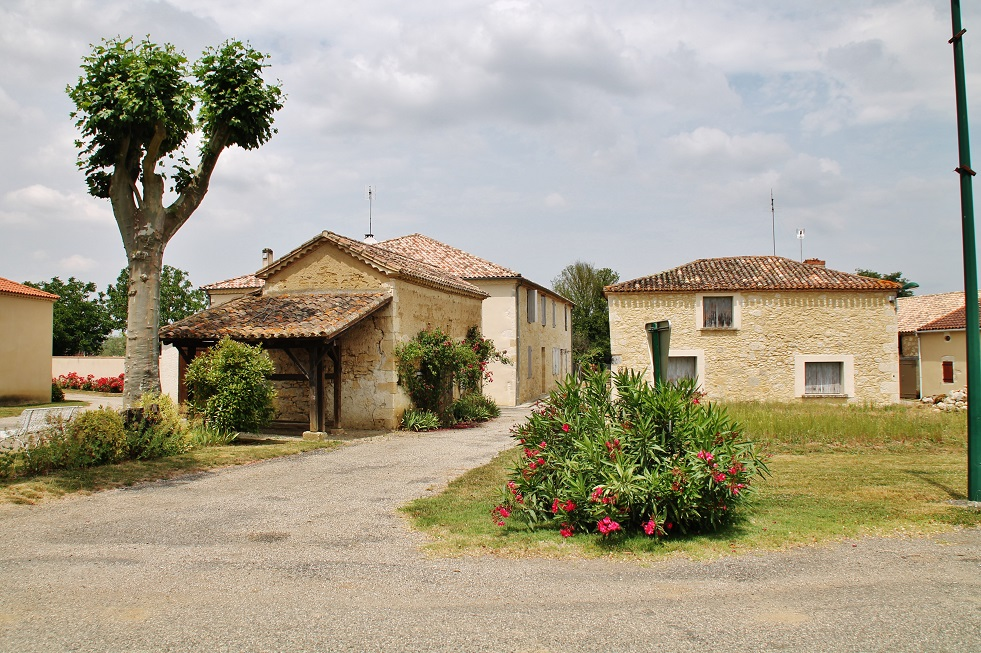
- The village
- Location of Peyrecave
- Location within France Location within Occitanie
- Coordinates: 43°59′52″N 0°49′14″E
- Country: France
- Region: Occitania
- Department: Gers
- Arrondissement: Condom
- Canton: Lectoure-Lomagne

Government
  - Mayor (2020–2026): Christian Mauroy
- Area^{1}: 5.07 km^{2} (1.96 sq mi)
- Elevation: 47 m (154 ft)
- Highest elevation: 147 m (482 ft)
- Lowest elevation: 73 m (240 ft)
- Population (2023): 70
  - Density: 14/km^{2} (36/sq mi)
- Time zone: UTC+01:00 (CET)
  - Summer (DST): UTC+02:00 (CEST)
- INSEE/Postal code: 32314 /32340
- ^{1} French Land Register data, which excludes lakes, ponds, glaciers > 1 km^{2} (0.386 sq mi or 247 acres) and river estuaries.

Peyrecave (French pronunciation: [pɛʁkav]; Occitan: Pèiracava) is a commune in the Gers department in southwestern France.

== Geography ==
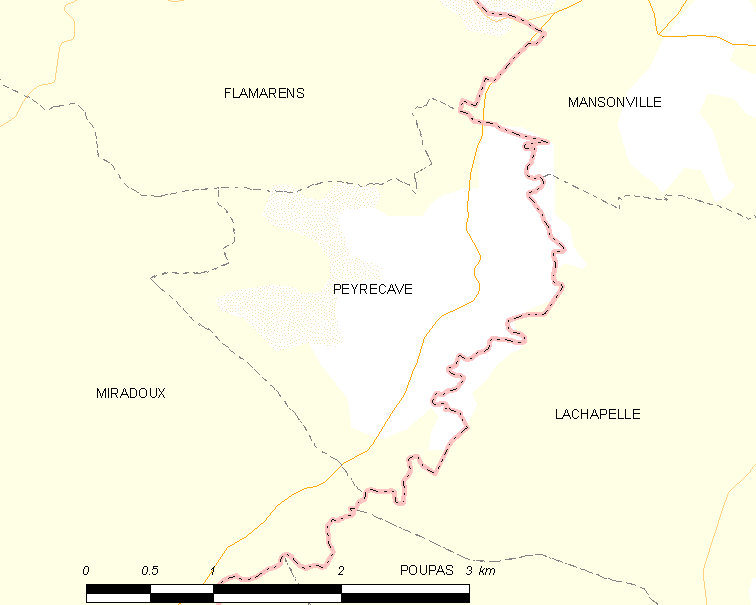
Peyrecave and its surrounding communes

== Population ==
Historical population
Year	Pop.	±% p.a.
1968	140	—
1975	129	−1.16%
1982	120	−1.03%
1990	105	−1.66%
1999	82	−2.71%
2007	88	+0.89%
2012	74	−3.41%
2017	72	−0.55%
2023	70	−0.47%
Source: INSEE

== See also ==
- Communes of the Gers department
