= Canton of Lectoure-Lomagne =

Administrative division of Gers department, France

Coordinates: 43.93°N 0.62°E

The canton of Lectoure-Lomagne is an administrative division of the Gers department, southwestern France. It was created at the French canton reorganisation which came into effect in March 2015. Its seat is in Lectoure.

It consists of the following communes:

1. Berrac
2. Castéra-Lectourois
3. Castet-Arrouy
4. Flamarens
5. Gazaupouy
6. Gimbrède
7. L'Isle-Bouzon
8. Lagarde
9. Larroque-Engalin
10. Lectoure
11. Ligardes
12. Marsolan
13. Mas-d'Auvignon
14. Miradoux
15. Pergain-Taillac
16. Peyrecave
17. Plieux
18. Pouy-Roquelaure
19. La Romieu
20. Saint-Antoine
21. Saint-Avit-Frandat
22. Sainte-Mère
23. Saint-Martin-de-Goyne
24. Saint-Mézard
25. Sempesserre
26. Terraube
