= Larroque-Engalin =

- Commune
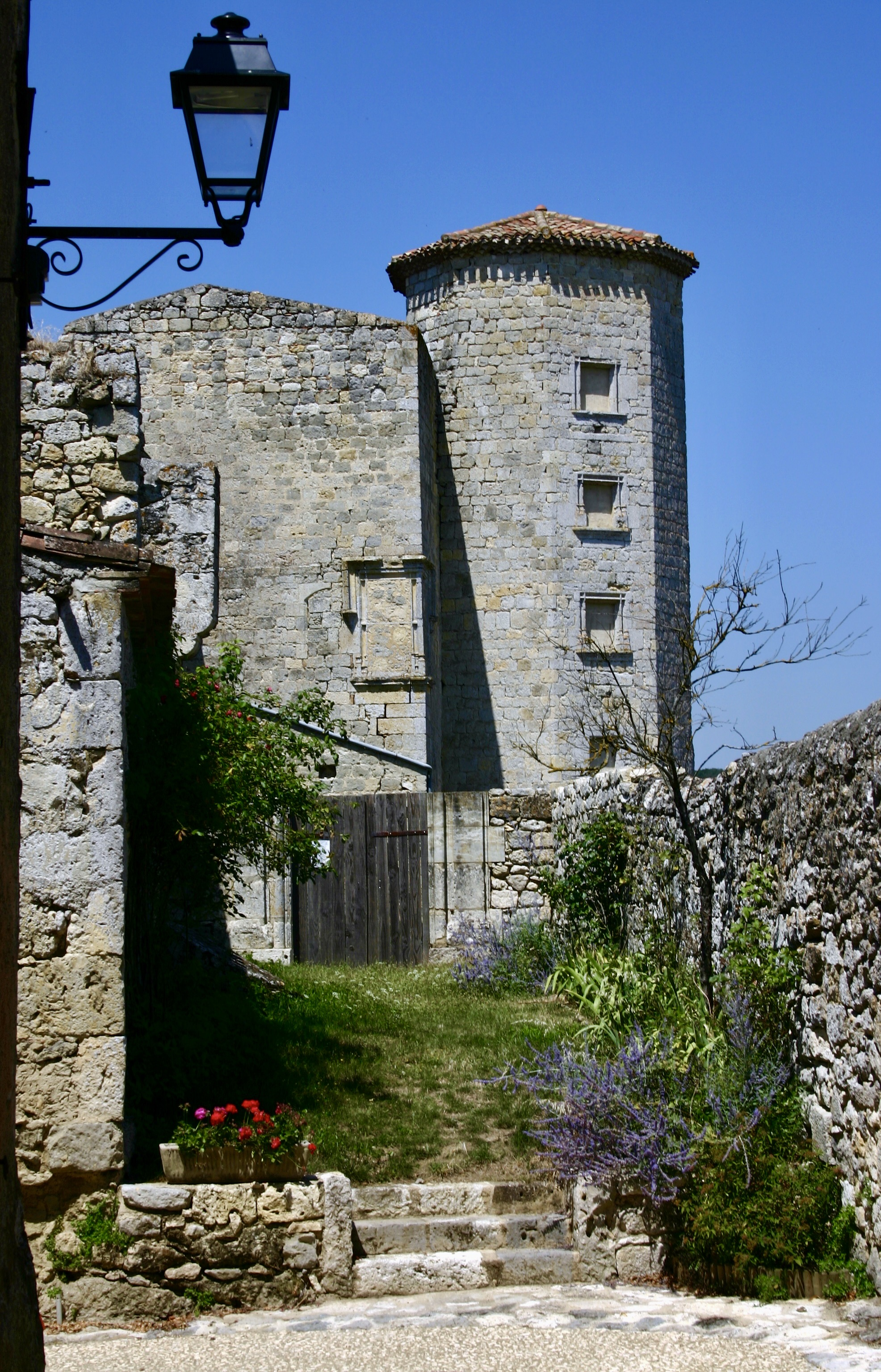
- The heptagonal tower in Larroque-Engalin

- Coat of arms
- Location of Larroque-Engalin
- Location within France Location within Occitanie
- Coordinates: 43°59′27″N 0°32′32″E
- Country: France
- Region: Occitania
- Department: Gers
- Arrondissement: Condom
- Canton: Lectoure-Lomagne
- Intercommunality: Lomagne Gersoise

Government
  - Mayor (2020–2026): René Carpentier
- Area^{1}: 6.16 km^{2} (2.38 sq mi)
- Elevation: 156 m (512 ft)
- Highest elevation: 203 m (666 ft)
- Lowest elevation: 72 m (236 ft)
- Population (2023): 44
  - Density: 7.1/km^{2} (18/sq mi)
- Time zone: UTC+01:00 (CET)
  - Summer (DST): UTC+02:00 (CEST)
- INSEE/Postal code: 32195 /32480
- ^{1} French Land Register data, which excludes lakes, ponds, glaciers > 1 km^{2} (0.386 sq mi or 247 acres) and river estuaries.

Larroque-Engalin (French pronunciation: [laʁɔk ɑ̃ɡalɛ̃]; Occitan: La Ròca Engalin) is a commune in the Gers department in southwestern France.

== Geography ==
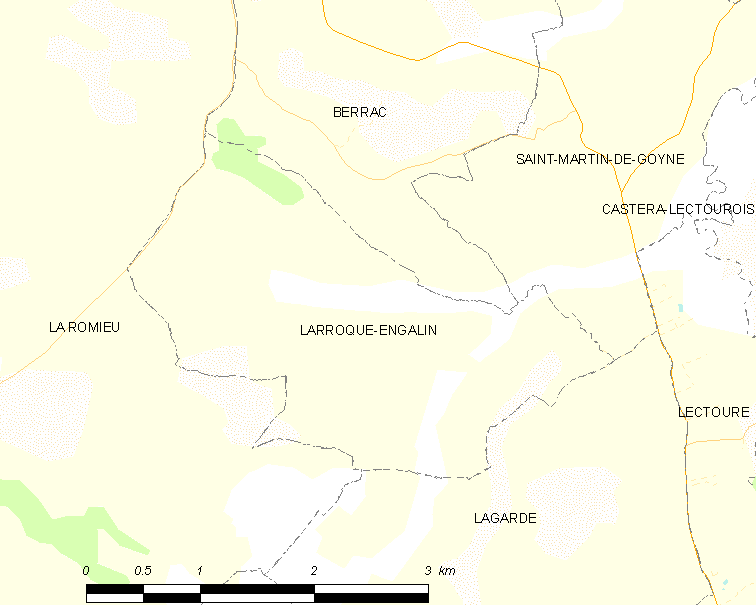
Larroque-Engalin and its surrounding communes

== Population ==
Historical population
Year	Pop.	±% p.a.
1968	86	—
1975	66	−3.71%
1982	55	−2.57%
1990	53	−0.46%
1999	59	+1.20%
2007	59	+0.00%
2012	49	−3.65%
2017	49	+0.00%
2023	44	−1.78%
Source: INSEE

== See also ==
- Communes of the Gers department
