= Miradoux =

- Commune
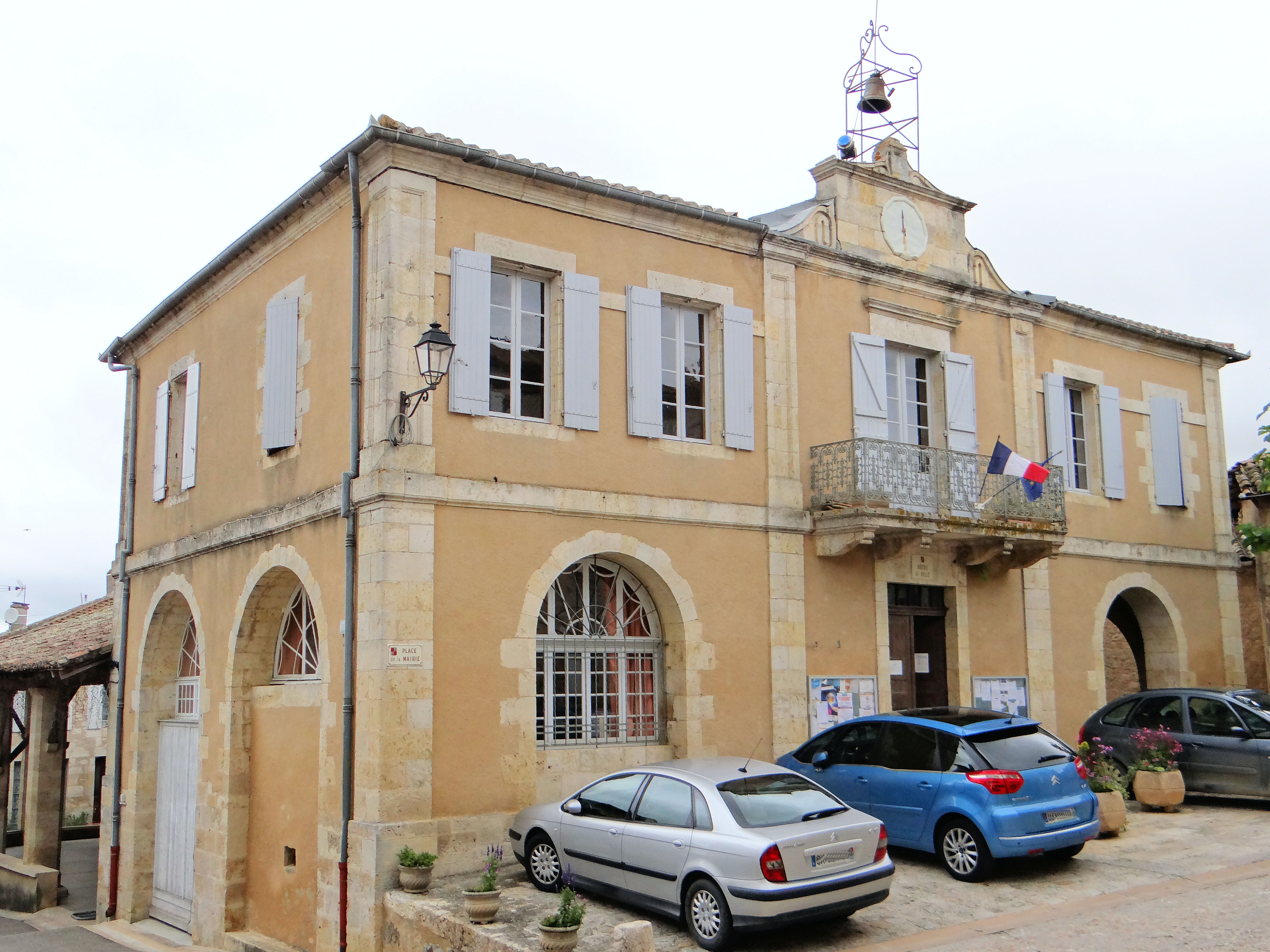
- Town hall

- Coat of arms
- Location of Miradoux
- Location within France Location within Occitanie
- Coordinates: 43°59′56″N 0°45′24″E
- Country: France
- Region: Occitania
- Department: Gers
- Arrondissement: Condom
- Canton: Lectoure-Lomagne
- Intercommunality: Lomagne Gersoise

Government
  - Mayor (2020–2026): Jérémy Lagarde
- Area^{1}: 34.58 km^{2} (13.35 sq mi)
- Highest elevation: 227 m (745 ft)
- Lowest elevation: 79 m (259 ft)
- Population (2023): 530
  - Density: 15/km^{2} (40/sq mi)
- Time zone: UTC+01:00 (CET)
  - Summer (DST): UTC+02:00 (CEST)
- INSEE/Postal code: 32253 /32340
- ^{1} French Land Register data, which excludes lakes, ponds, glaciers > 1 km^{2} (0.386 sq mi or 247 acres) and river estuaries.

Miradoux (French pronunciation: [miʁadu]; Occitan: Miradors) is a commune in the Gers department in southwestern France.

== Geography ==
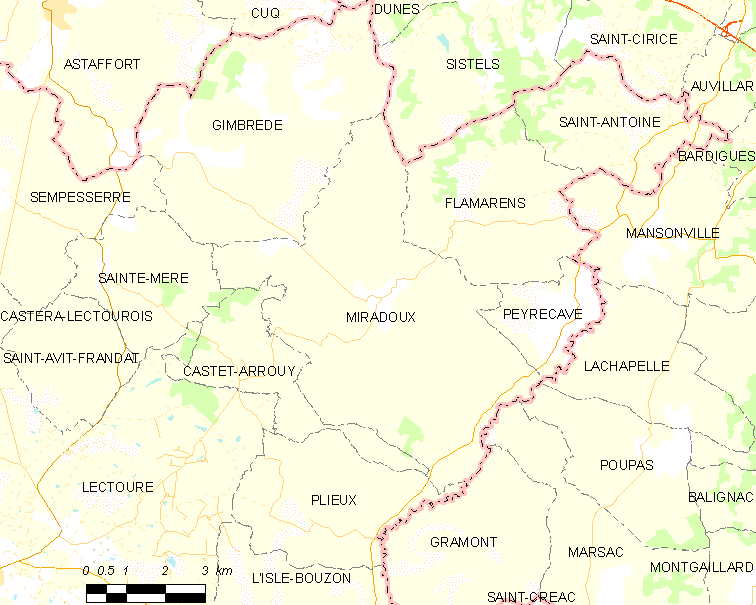
Miradoux and its surrounding communes

The river Auroue forms most of the commune's western border and the Arrats all of its southeastern border.

== Population ==
Historical population
Year	Pop.	±% p.a.
1968	728	—
1975	654	−1.52%
1982	647	−0.15%
1990	594	−1.06%
1999	497	−1.96%
2007	528	+0.76%
2012	541	+0.49%
2017	501	−1.52%
2023	530	+0.94%
Source: INSEE

== See also ==
- Communes of the Gers department
