= Gazaupouy =

- Commune
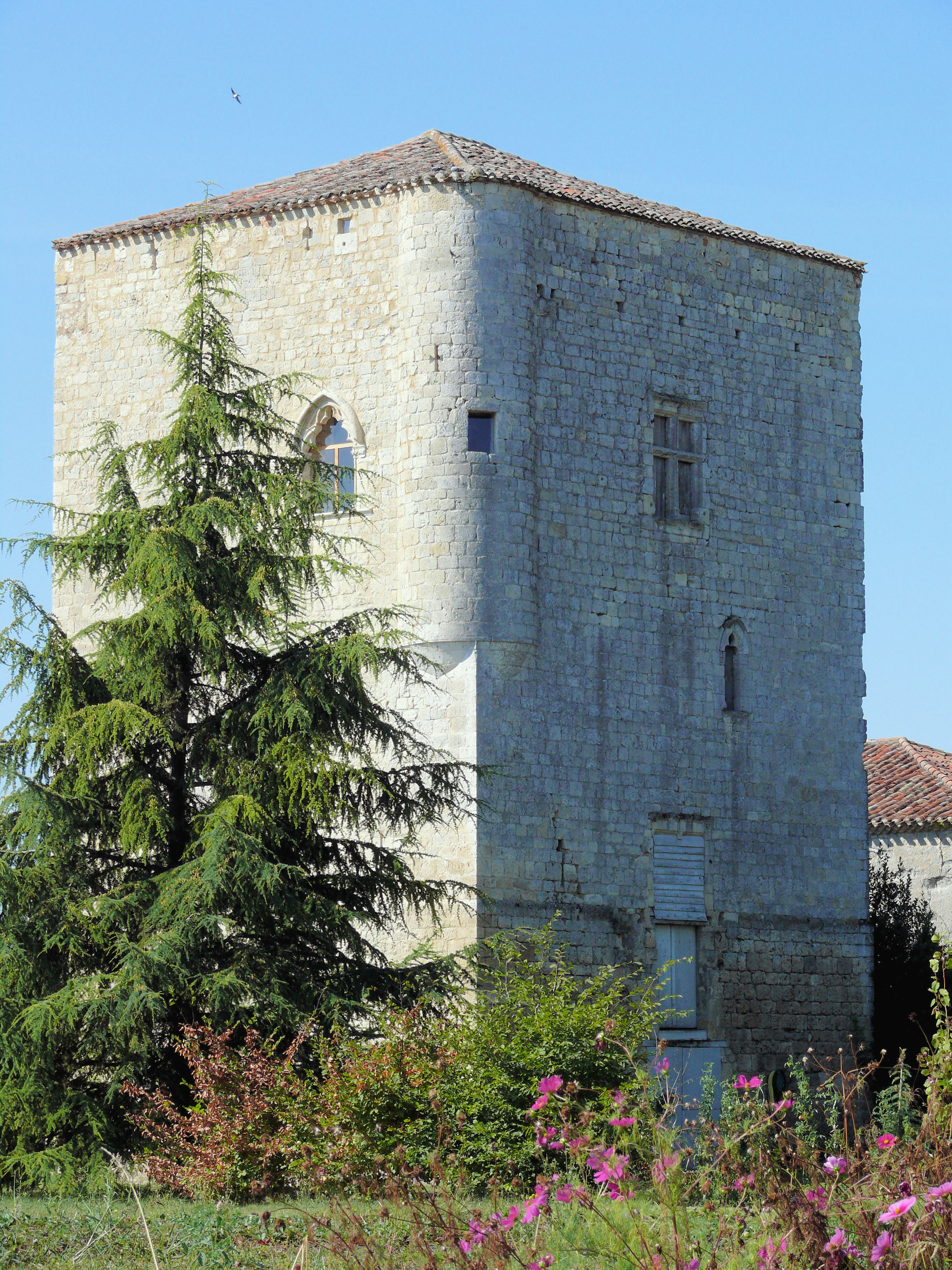
- The tower of Estrepouy in Gazaupouy

- Coat of arms
- Location of Gazaupouy
- Location within France Location within Occitanie
- Coordinates: 44°00′31″N 0°27′05″E
- Country: France
- Region: Occitania
- Department: Gers
- Arrondissement: Condom
- Canton: Lectoure-Lomagne

Government
  - Mayor (2020–2026): Philippe Boyer
- Area^{1}: 20.94 km^{2} (8.08 sq mi)
- Highest elevation: 220 m (720 ft)
- Lowest elevation: 83 m (272 ft)
- Population (2023): 252
  - Density: 12.0/km^{2} (31.2/sq mi)
- Time zone: UTC+01:00 (CET)
  - Summer (DST): UTC+02:00 (CEST)
- INSEE/Postal code: 32143 /32480
- ^{1} French Land Register data, which excludes lakes, ponds, glaciers > 1 km^{2} (0.386 sq mi or 247 acres) and river estuaries.

Gazaupouy (French pronunciation: [ɡazopwi]; Occitan: Gasaupoi) is a commune in the Gers department in southwestern France.

== Geography ==
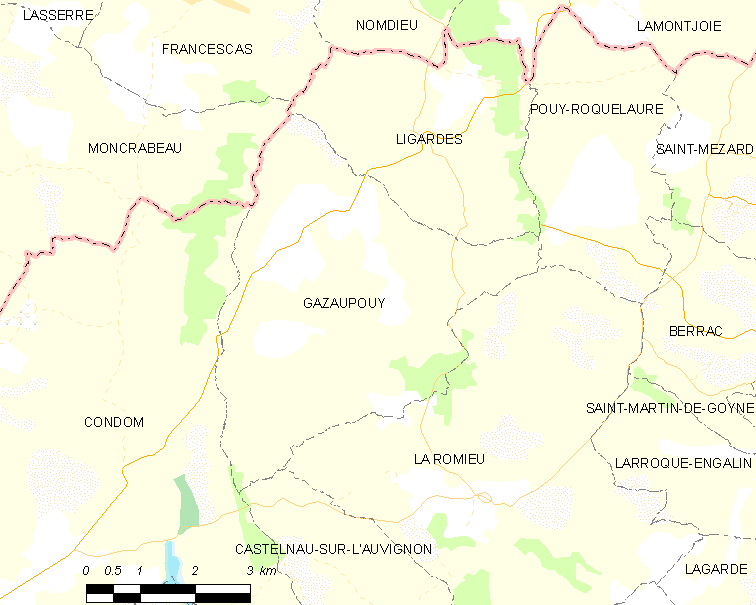
Gazaupouy and its surrounding communes

== Population ==
Historical population
Year	Pop.	±% p.a.
1968	414	—
1975	347	−2.49%
1982	316	−1.33%
1990	292	−0.98%
1999	297	+0.19%
2007	300	+0.13%
2012	293	−0.47%
2017	296	+0.20%
2023	252	−2.65%
Source: INSEE

== Heraldry ==
Coat of arms of Gazaupouy	Tierced in reversed pairle: 1st gules a silver tower (of the place: d'Estrepouy), open, pierced and masoned sable, 2nd azure a bunch of gold grapes, stalked and leaved vert, 3rd or a meeting of Landes cow sable, the headpiece compony of four pieces or and gules, the horns argent with sable caps; a low silver sword, hilted or overall in chief on the partition.

== See also ==
- Communes of the Gers department
