= Mas-d'Auvignon =

- Commune
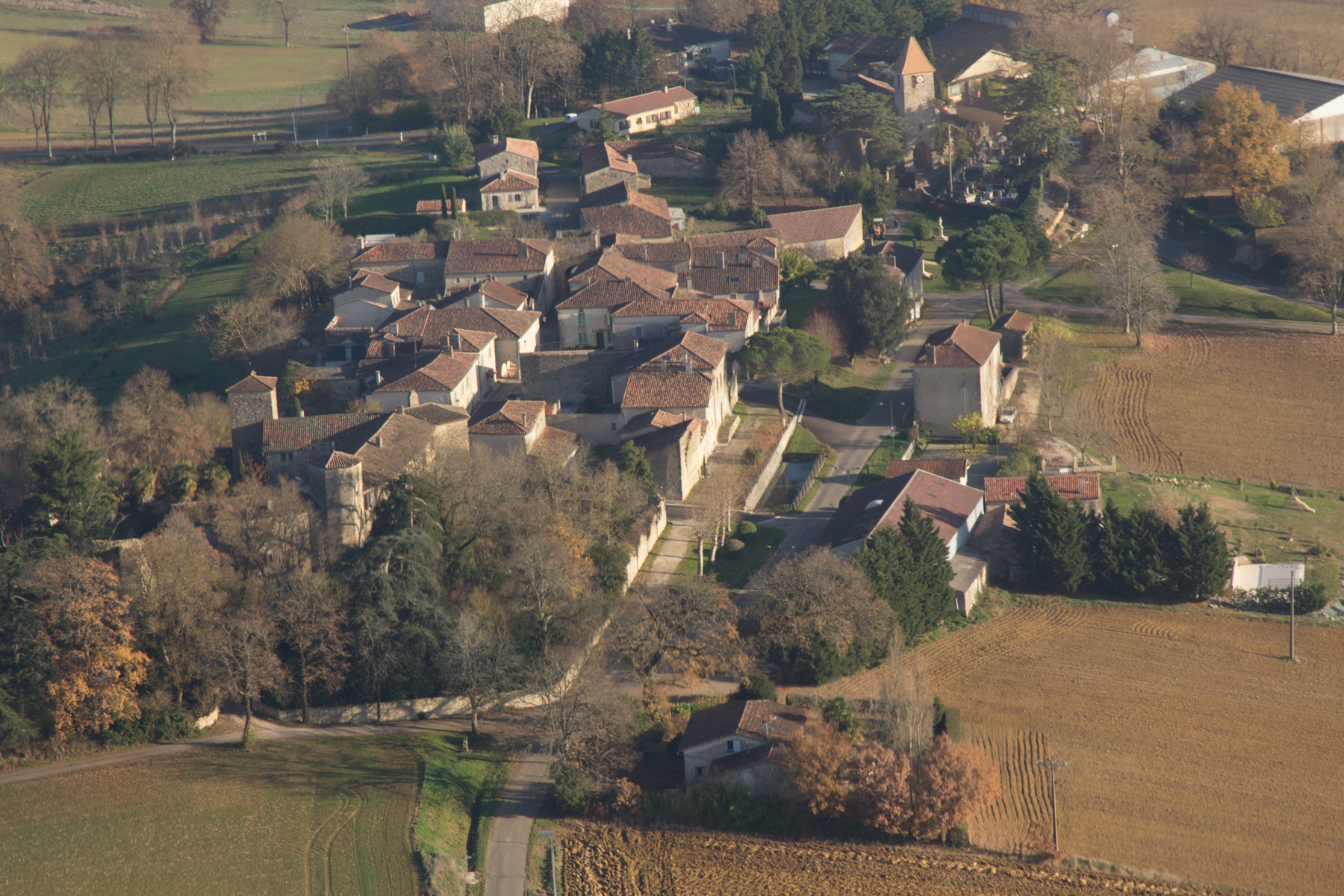
- A general view of Mas-d'Auvignon
- Location of Mas-d'Auvignon
- Location within France Location within Occitanie
- Coordinates: 43°53′30″N 0°30′14″E
- Country: France
- Region: Occitania
- Department: Gers
- Arrondissement: Condom
- Canton: Lectoure-Lomagne
- Intercommunality: Lomagne Gersoise

Government
  - Mayor (2020–2026): Max Roumat
- Area^{1}: 13.74 km^{2} (5.31 sq mi)
- Elevation: 224 m (735 ft)
- Highest elevation: 233 m (764 ft)
- Lowest elevation: 97 m (318 ft)
- Population (2023): 167
  - Density: 12.2/km^{2} (31.5/sq mi)
- Time zone: UTC+01:00 (CET)
  - Summer (DST): UTC+02:00 (CEST)
- INSEE/Postal code: 32241 /32700
- ^{1} French Land Register data, which excludes lakes, ponds, glaciers > 1 km^{2} (0.386 sq mi or 247 acres) and river estuaries.

Mas-d'Auvignon (French pronunciation: [ma(s) doviɲɔ̃]; Occitan: Lo Mas d'Auvinhon) is a commune in the Gers department in southwestern France.

== Geography ==
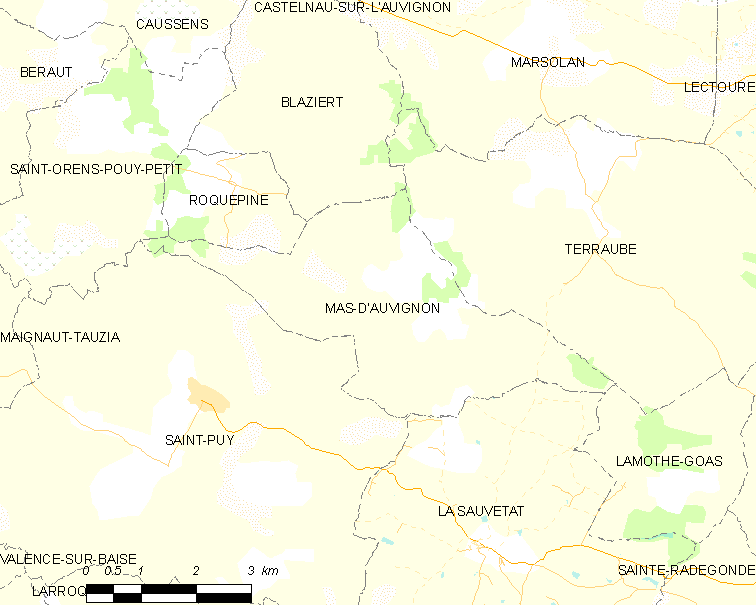
Mas-d'Auvignon and its surrounding communes

== Population ==
Historical population
| Year | Pop. | ±% p.a. |
|---|---|---|
| 1968 | 236 | — |
| 1975 | 214 | −1.39% |
| 1982 | 183 | −2.21% |
| 1990 | 189 | +0.40% |
| 1999 | 171 | −1.11% |
| 2007 | 135 | −2.91% |
| 2012 | 177 | +5.57% |
| 2017 | 171 | −0.69% |
| 2023 | 167 | −0.39% |
Source: INSEE

== See also ==
- Communes of the Gers department
