= Antony Legard =

English cricketer

Personal information
- Full name: Antony Ronald Legard
- Born: 17 January 1912; Sialkot, Punjab, British India
- Died: 22 August 2004 (aged 92); Kelsall, Cheshire, England
- Nickname: Loopy
- Batting: Right-handed
- Bowling: Right-arm medium

Domestic team information
- Years: Team
- 1932–1935: Oxford University
- 1935: Worcestershire
- 1943/44: Europeans
- 1952: MCC
- FC debut: 11 May 1932 Oxford Univ. v Leicestershire
- Last FC: 9 September 1952 MCC v Ireland

Career statistics
Competition	First-class
Matches	36
Runs scored	234
Batting average	5.57
100s/50s	0/0
Top score	38
Balls bowled	6,206
Wickets	93
Bowling average	30.03
5 wickets in innings	3
10 wickets in match	0
Best bowling	7/36
Catches/stumpings	17/–
- Source: CricketArchive, 14 September 2007

Major Antony Ronald Legard MBE (17 January 1912 – 22 August 2004), nicknamed Loopy, was an Indian-born English first-class cricketer who played 36 matches, mostly for Oxford University, in the 1930s. He also played twice for Free Foresters and had one match each for Worcestershire, the Europeans in India and Marylebone Cricket Club (MCC).

Legard made his first-class debut for Oxford against Leicestershire at The University Parks in May 1932; he took four wickets, including that of Alan Shipman in both innings. He played consistently that season, including against the South Americans (on their only first-class tour) when he scored 38, the only time he ever passed 20. Later in the year he was selected for the Varsity Match against Cambridge University at Lord's, where he took six wickets in a drawn match.

Legard played for much of the 1933 season, but was not selected for the Varsity Match, and did not appear at all in 1934. However, 1935 saw him once again picked for the Lord's game, and once again perform excellently: he obtained career-best figures of 7–36 in the second innings with what his Wisden obituary called a "devastating" opening spell of swing bowling. Even so, a powerful Cambridge side won the game by a wide margin.

That game marked his last appearance for Oxford, but less than a fortnight later he played his one and only County Championship match, appearing for Worcestershire at Northampton. He took no wickets, but his 18 from number eleven in the first innings was a useful contribution to Worcestershire's eventual 30-run victory.

The remainder of Legard's first-class career consisted of four matches spread over almost a decade: one for Europeans against Hindus in the Bombay Pentangular — the Europeans were thrashed by an innings and 209 runs, but Legard claimed four wickets — two appearances for Free Foresters against Cambridge University, and finally (aged 40) a one-off appearance for MCC against Ireland in Dublin.

Legard was educated at Winchester College and Trinity College, Oxford. During World War II he served in the Royal Engineers and was appointed MBE (military) in 1940 "for distinguished services in the field." Later he worked for ICI.
