= Plieux =

- Commune
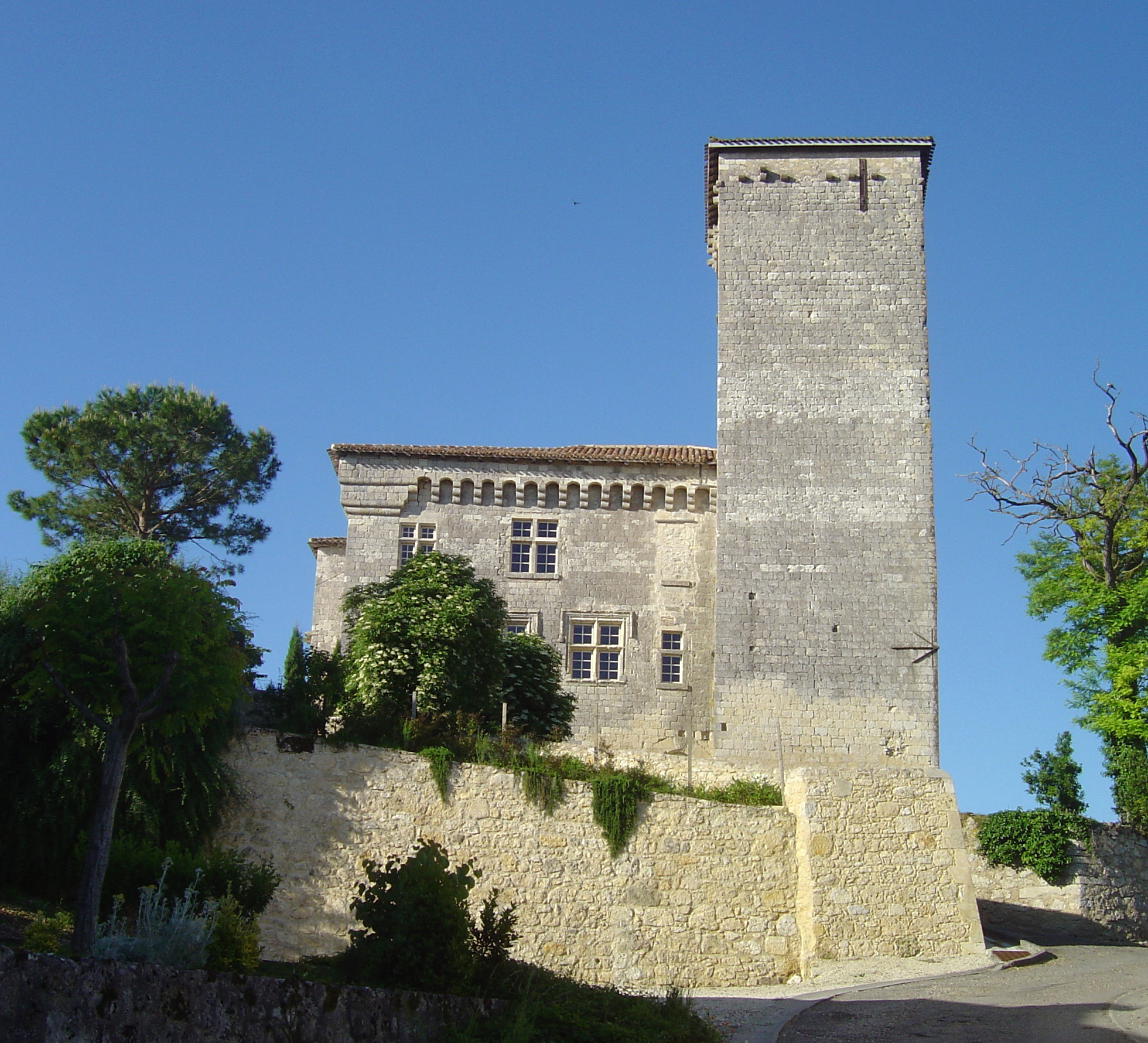
- Château de Plieux
- Location of Plieux
- Location within France Location within Occitanie
- Coordinates: 43°57′05″N 0°44′05″E
- Country: France
- Region: Occitania
- Department: Gers
- Arrondissement: Condom
- Canton: Lectoure-Lomagne

Government
  - Mayor (2020–2026): Maryse Claverie
- Area^{1}: 12.27 km^{2} (4.74 sq mi)
- Elevation: 187 m (614 ft)
- Highest elevation: 187 m (614 ft)
- Lowest elevation: 82 m (269 ft)
- Population (2023): 159
  - Density: 13.0/km^{2} (33.6/sq mi)
- Time zone: UTC+01:00 (CET)
  - Summer (DST): UTC+02:00 (CEST)
- INSEE/Postal code: 32320 /32340
- ^{1} French Land Register data, which excludes lakes, ponds, glaciers > 1 km^{2} (0.386 sq mi or 247 acres) and river estuaries.

Plieux (French pronunciation: [plijø]; Occitan: Plius) is a commune in the Gers department in southwestern France.

== Geography ==
=== Locality ===
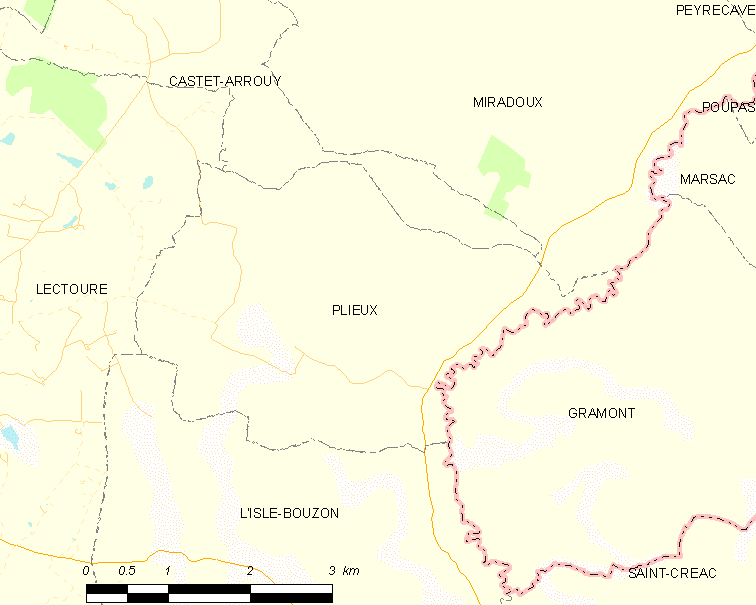
Plieux and its surrounding communes

=== Hydrography ===
The Auroue flows north through the western part of the commune; the river Arrats forms all of the commune's eastern border.

== Population ==
Historical population
Year	Pop.	±% p.a.
1968	232	—
1975	214	−1.15%
1982	195	−1.32%
1990	186	−0.59%
1999	174	−0.74%
2007	157	−1.28%
2012	154	−0.39%
2017	134	−2.74%
2023	159	+2.89%
Source: INSEE

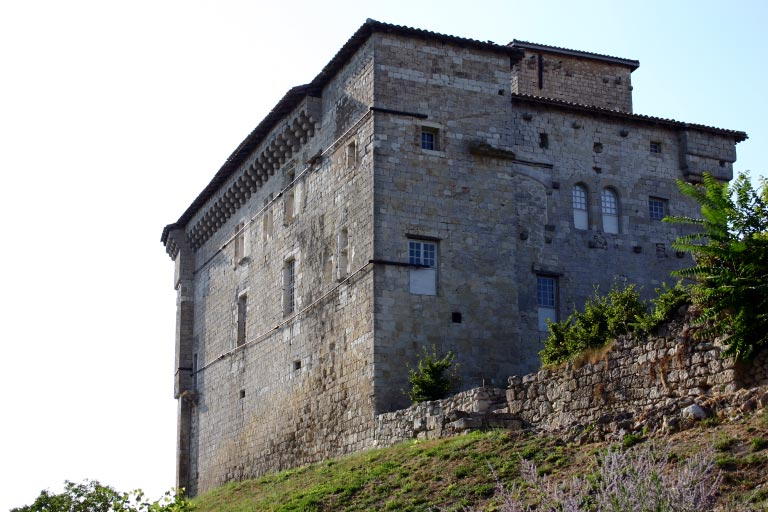

== See also ==
- Communes of the Gers department
