= Maurice L. Lagarde =

Following Hurricane Katrina, Lagarde was appointed co-chair of the Bring New Orleans Back Commission in 2005.
