= Battle of Lagarde =

Battle of Lagarde may refer to:

- Battle of Lagarde (1914), a World War I battle between German and French forces
- Battle of Lagarde (1940), a World War II battle between German and Polish forces
