= Garde (name) =

Garde is a surname and a masculine given name. Notable people with the name include:

== Surname ==
- Adele De Garde (1899–1972), American actress
- Betty Garde (1905–1989), American actress
- François Garde (born 1959), French writer and civil servant
- Giedo van der Garde (born 1985), Dutch race car driver
- Gregory Garde (born 1949), Australian lawyer
- Jørgen Garde (1939–1996), Danish admiral
- Natanael Gärde (1880–1968), Swedish judge and politician
- Rémi Garde (born 1966), French footballer
- Thomas Vilhelm Garde (1859–1926), Danish naval officer and Arctic explorer
- Zarah Garde-Wilson (born 1978), Australian solicitor

== Given name ==
- Garde Gardom (1924–2013), Canadian politician and lawyer

== See also ==
- Daniel Vangarde (born 1947), French songwriter
