= Lagarde-Hachan =

- Commune
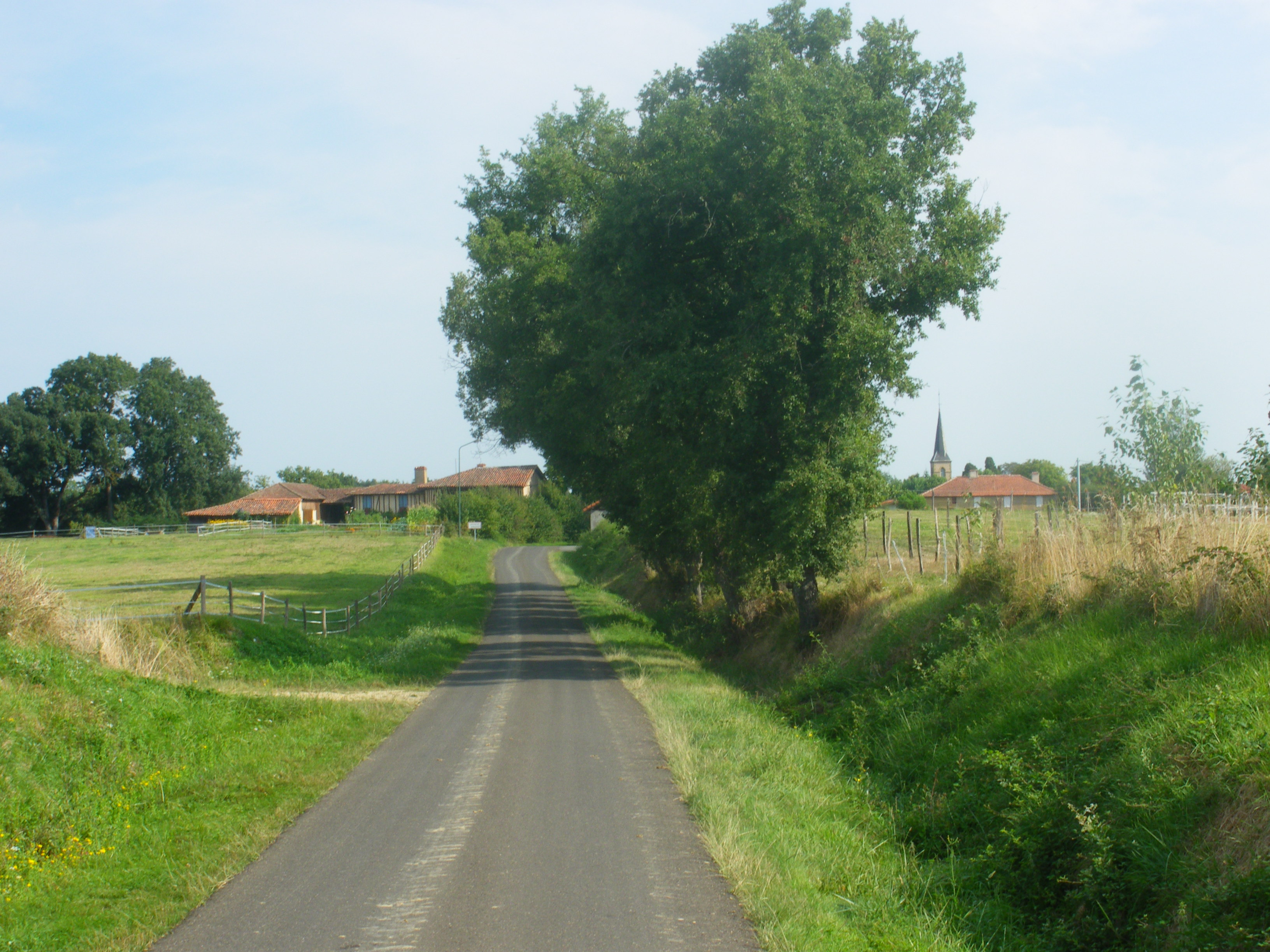
- A general view of Lagarde-Hachan
- Location of Lagarde-Hachan
- Location within France Location within Occitanie
- Coordinates: 43°24′27″N 0°29′40″E
- Country: France
- Region: Occitania
- Department: Gers
- Arrondissement: Mirande
- Canton: Mirande-Astarac

Government
  - Mayor (2020–2026): Monique Noguès
- Area^{1}: 8.57 km^{2} (3.31 sq mi)
- Elevation: 300 m (980 ft)
- Highest elevation: 285 m (935 ft)
- Lowest elevation: 202 m (663 ft)
- Population (2023): 164
  - Density: 19.1/km^{2} (49.6/sq mi)
- Time zone: UTC+01:00 (CET)
  - Summer (DST): UTC+02:00 (CEST)
- INSEE/Postal code: 32177 /32300
- ^{1} French Land Register data, which excludes lakes, ponds, glaciers > 1 km^{2} (0.386 sq mi or 247 acres) and river estuaries.

Lagarde-Hachan (French pronunciation: [laɡaʁd aʃɑ̃]; Gascon: La Garda e Haishan) is a commune in the Gers department in southwestern France.

== Geography ==
The Petite Baïse forms part of the commune's western border.

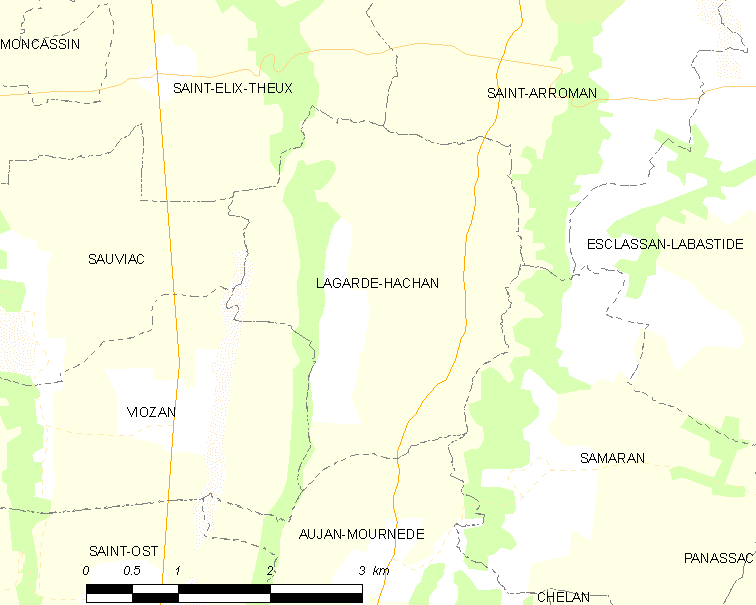
Lagarde-Hachan and its surrounding communes

== Population ==
Historical population
Year	Pop.	±% p.a.
1968	187	—
1975	154	−2.74%
1982	131	−2.28%
1990	118	−1.30%
1999	131	+1.17%
2007	173	+3.54%
2012	156	−2.05%
2017	164	+1.01%
2023	164	+0.00%
Source: INSEE

== See also ==
- Communes of the Gers department
