= Lagarde, Hautes-Pyrénées =

Lagarde
- Commune
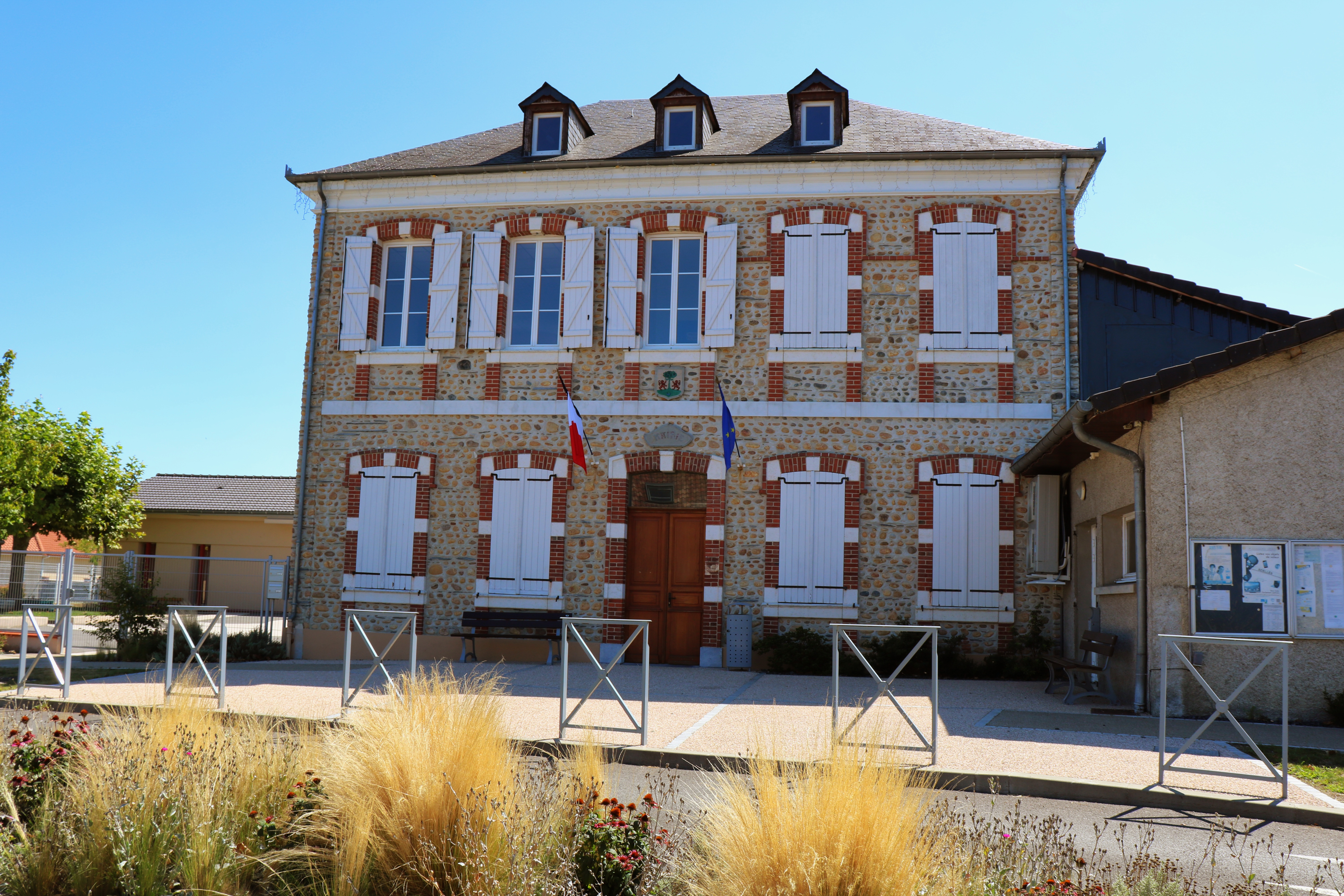
- Town hall

- Coat of arms
- Location of Lagarde
- Location within France Location within Occitanie
- Coordinates: 43°18′24″N 0°02′00″E
- Country: France
- Region: Occitania
- Department: Hautes-Pyrénées
- Arrondissement: Tarbes
- Canton: Vic-en-Bigorre
- Intercommunality: CA Tarbes-Lourdes-Pyrénées

Government
  - Mayor (2020–2026): Danielle Carcaillon
- Area^{1}: 4.91 km^{2} (1.90 sq mi)
- Elevation: 300 m (980 ft)
- Highest elevation: 368 m (1,207 ft)
- Lowest elevation: 251 m (823 ft)
- Population (2023): 530
  - Density: 110/km^{2} (280/sq mi)
- Time zone: UTC+01:00 (CET)
  - Summer (DST): UTC+02:00 (CEST)
- INSEE/Postal code: 65244 /65320
- ^{1} French Land Register data, which excludes lakes, ponds, glaciers > 1 km^{2} (0.386 sq mi or 247 acres) and river estuaries.

Lagarde (French pronunciation: [laɡaʁd]; Occitan: La Garda) is a commune in the Hautes-Pyrénées department in south-western France.

== See also ==
- Communes of the Hautes-Pyrénées department
