= Lagarde, Haute-Garonne =

Lagarde Lauragais
- Commune
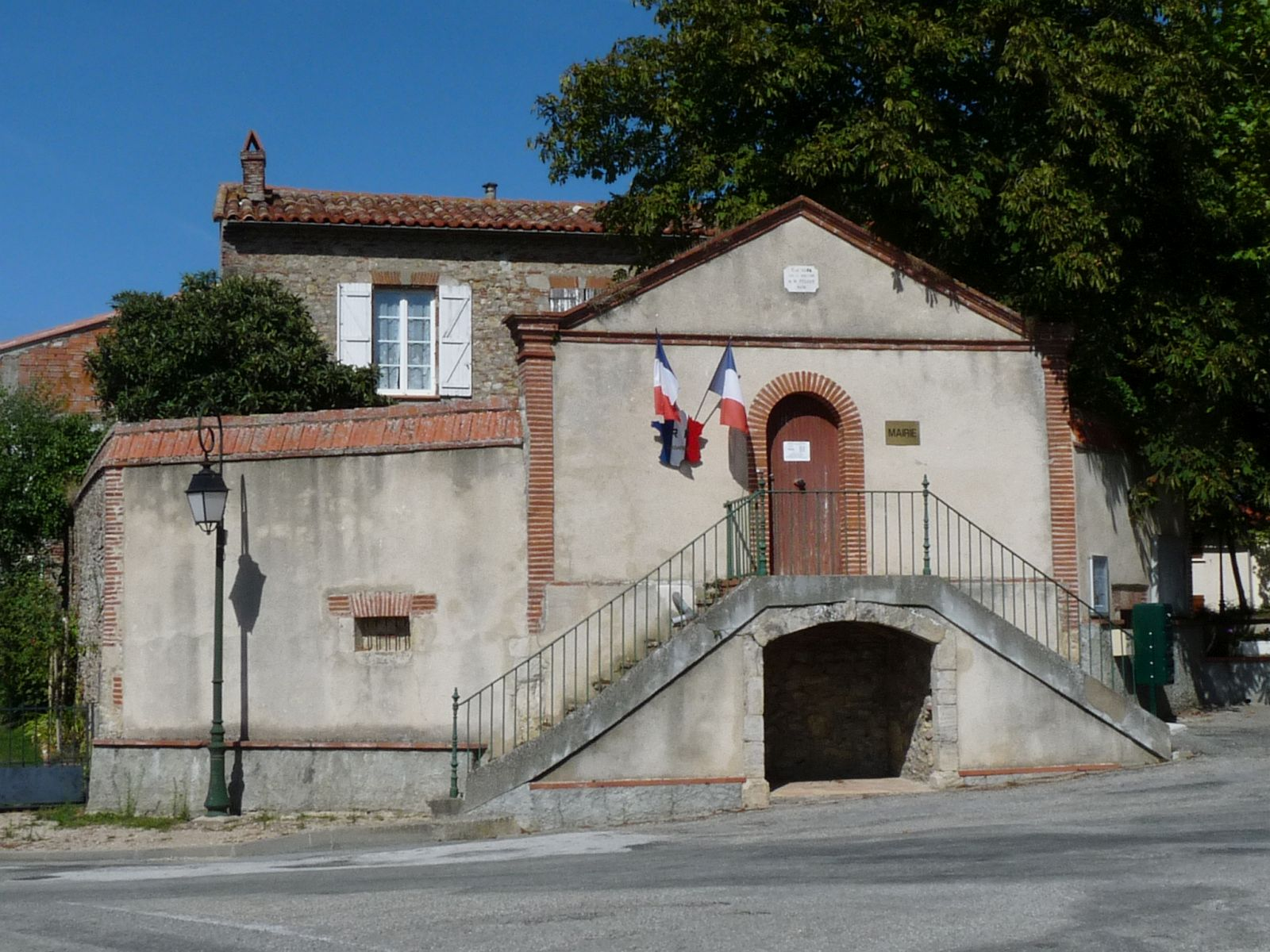
- The town hall in Lagarde

- Coat of arms
- Location of Lagarde Lauragais
- Location within France Location within Occitanie
- Coordinates: 43°20′47″N 1°42′50″E
- Country: France
- Region: Occitania
- Department: Haute-Garonne
- Arrondissement: Toulouse
- Canton: Revel

Government
  - Mayor (2020–2026): Marielle Peiro-Fournier
- Area^{1}: 11.69 km^{2} (4.51 sq mi)
- Elevation: 280 m (920 ft)
- Highest elevation: 292 m (958 ft)
- Lowest elevation: 185 m (607 ft)
- Population (2023): 432
  - Density: 37.0/km^{2} (95.7/sq mi)
- Time zone: UTC+01:00 (CET)
  - Summer (DST): UTC+02:00 (CEST)
- INSEE/Postal code: 31262 /31290
- ^{1} French Land Register data, which excludes lakes, ponds, glaciers > 1 km^{2} (0.386 sq mi or 247 acres) and river estuaries.

Lagarde (French pronunciation: [laɡaʁd]; Occitan: La Garda de Lauragués) is a commune in the Haute-Garonne department in southwestern France.

== Population ==
Historical population
Year	Pop.	±% p.a.
1968	243	—
1975	195	−3.09%
1982	176	−1.45%
1990	194	+1.22%
1999	239	+2.34%
2007	289	+2.40%
2012	352	+4.02%
2017	409	+3.05%
2023	432	+0.92%
Source: INSEE

== See also ==
Communes of the Haute-Garonne department
