= Lagarde, Gers =

Lagarde
- Commune
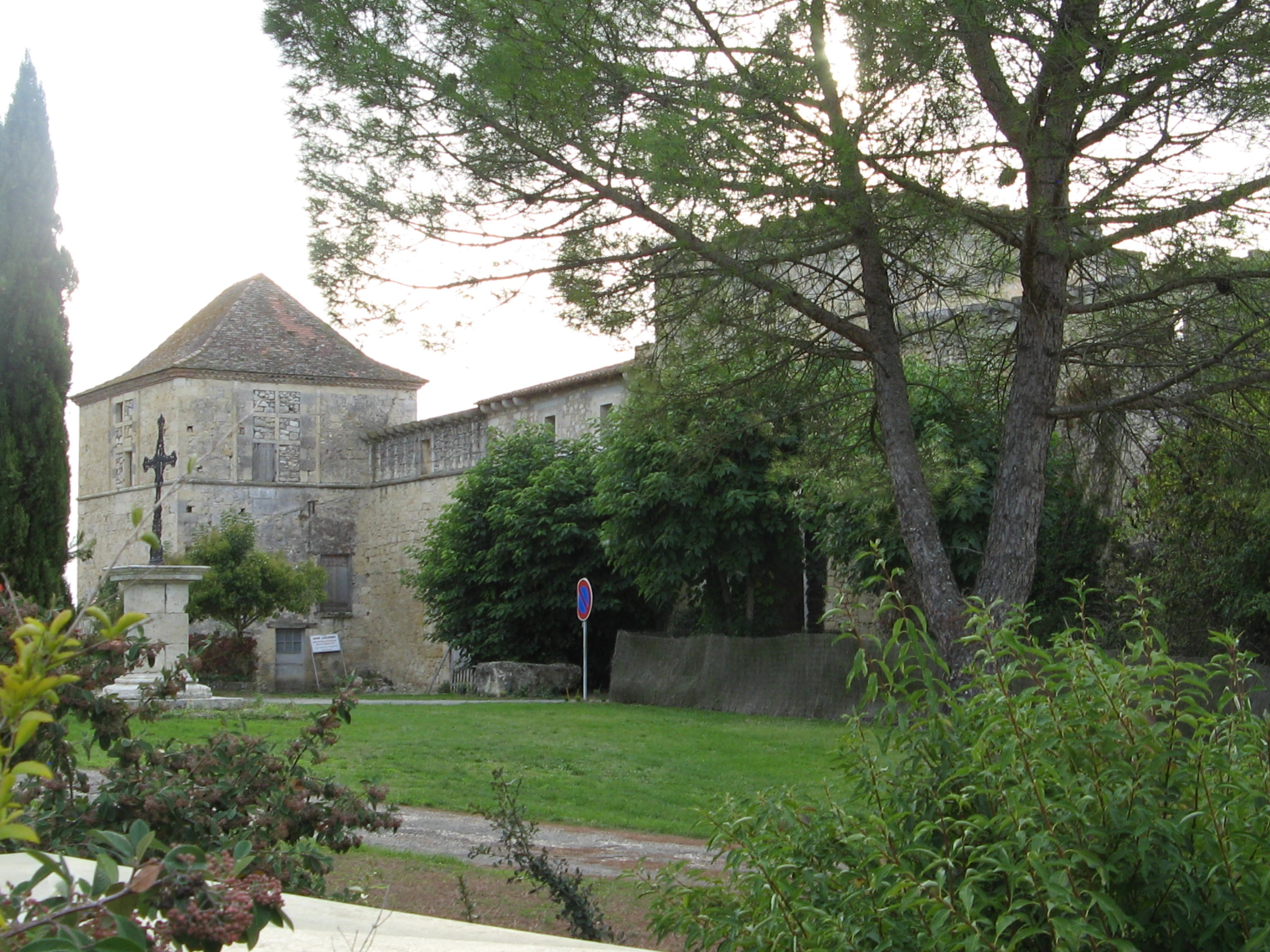
- Fortress
- Location of Lagarde
- Location within France Location within Occitanie
- Coordinates: 43°57′54″N 0°33′23″E
- Country: France
- Region: Occitania
- Department: Gers
- Arrondissement: Condom
- Canton: Lectoure-Lomagne
- Intercommunality: Lomagne Gersoise

Government
  - Mayor (2020–2026): Christian Manabera
- Area^{1}: 8.85 km^{2} (3.42 sq mi)
- Elevation: 170 m (560 ft)
- Highest elevation: 184 m (604 ft)
- Lowest elevation: 72 m (236 ft)
- Population (2023): 123
  - Density: 13.9/km^{2} (36.0/sq mi)
- Time zone: UTC+01:00 (CET)
  - Summer (DST): UTC+02:00 (CEST)
- INSEE/Postal code: 32176 /32700
- ^{1} French Land Register data, which excludes lakes, ponds, glaciers > 1 km^{2} (0.386 sq mi or 247 acres) and river estuaries.

Lagarde (French pronunciation: [laɡaʁd]; Occitan: La Garda) is a commune in the Gers department in southwestern France.

== Geography ==
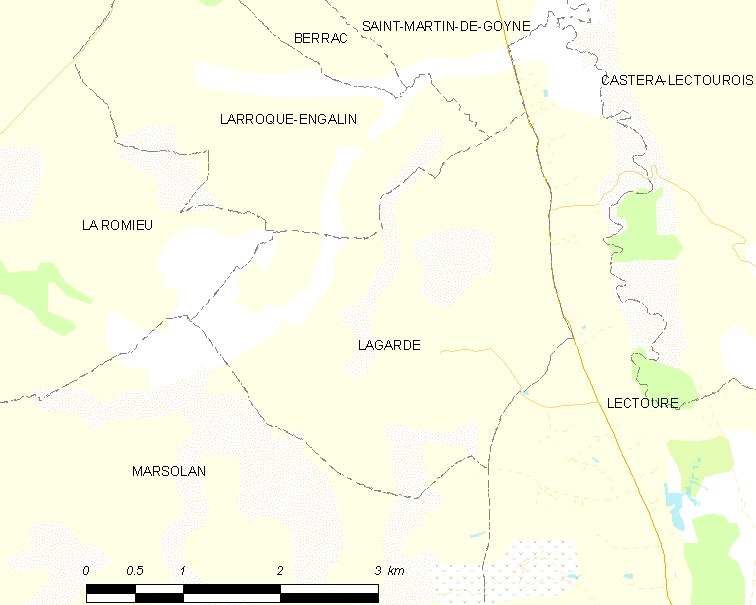
Lagarde and its surrounding communes

== Population ==
Historical population
Year	Pop.	±% p.a.
1968	200	—
1975	141	−4.87%
1982	148	+0.69%
1990	165	+1.37%
1999	132	−2.45%
2007	130	−0.19%
2012	121	−1.42%
2017	119	−0.33%
2023	123	+0.55%
Source: INSEE

== See also ==
- Communes of the Gers department
