= Lagarde, Ariège =

Commune in Occitanie, France

Lagarde
- Commune
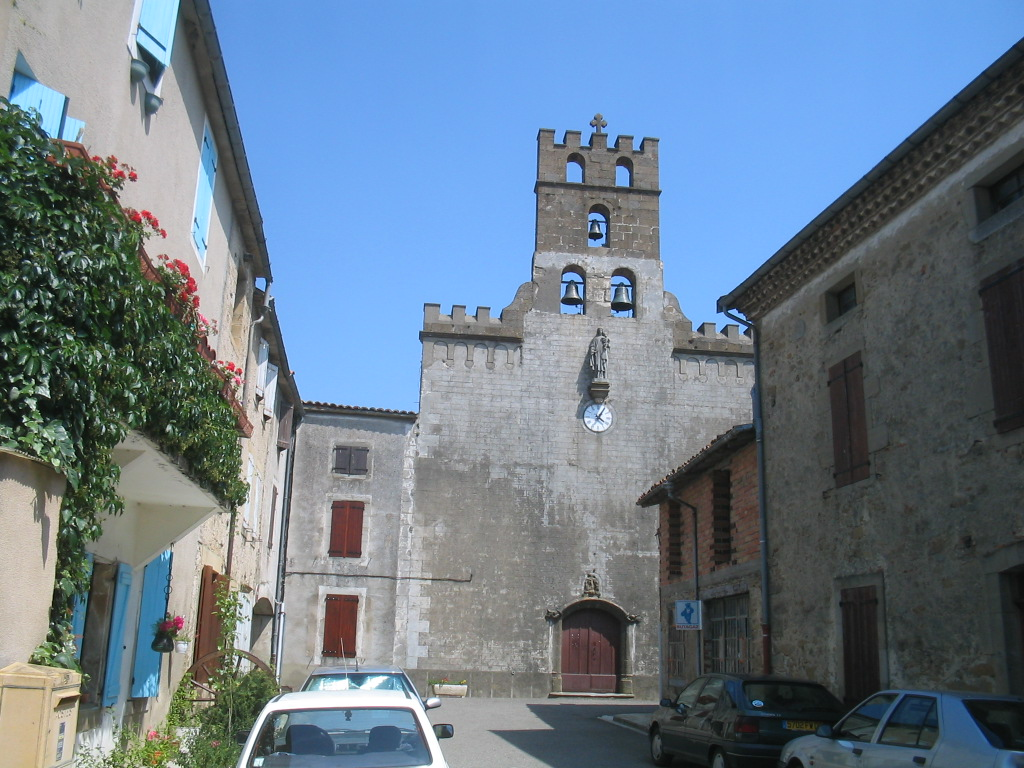
- The church in Lagarde

- Coat of arms
- Location of Lagarde
- Location within France Location within Occitanie
- Coordinates: 43°03′01″N 1°56′05″E
- Country: France
- Region: Occitania
- Department: Ariège
- Arrondissement: Pamiers
- Canton: Mirepoix
- Intercommunality: Pays de Mirepoix

Government
  - Mayor (2020–2026): Christian Chaubet
- Area^{1}: 11.93 km^{2} (4.61 sq mi)
- Elevation: 327 m (1,073 ft)
- Highest elevation: 543 m (1,781 ft)
- Lowest elevation: 316 m (1,037 ft)
- Population (2023): 217
  - Density: 18.2/km^{2} (47.1/sq mi)
- Time zone: UTC+01:00 (CET)
  - Summer (DST): UTC+02:00 (CEST)
- INSEE/Postal code: 09150 /09500
- ^{1} French Land Register data, which excludes lakes, ponds, glaciers > 1 km^{2} (0.386 sq mi or 247 acres) and river estuaries.

Lagarde (French pronunciation: [laɡaʁd]; Occitan: La Garda) is a commune in the Ariège department in southwestern France.

== History ==
On 25 May 1969, the commune of Lagarde was struck by an F3 tornado. It destroyed nearby hamlets and transportation in the village and the surrounding area. A few hours later in the department of Aude the tornado devastated the village of Leuc. Such a wave of powerful tornadoes is rare in France.

== Sights ==
=== Chateau ===
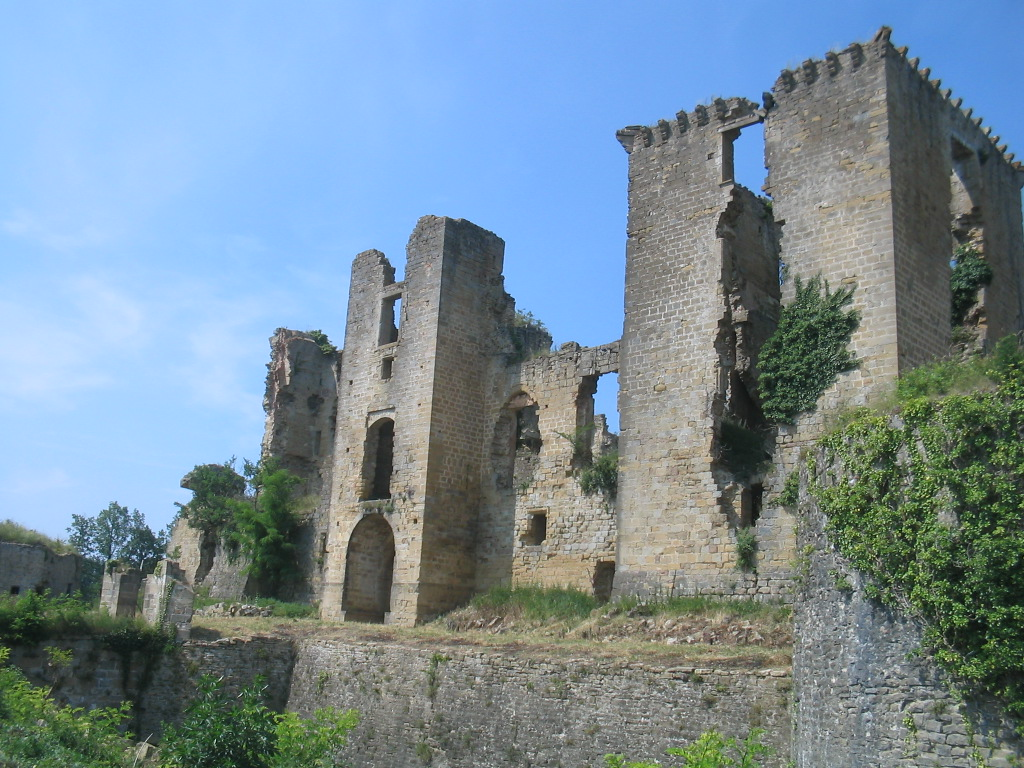
Chateau de Lagarde

The Château de Lagarde is an imposing medieval building constructed in the 11th century with the first square tower (1063–1065) by Ramiro I, King of Aragon and Count of Barcelona. Between the 1176 and 1180 the chateau developed with 4 square towers and with a rectangular entry with a door made out of wood, a drawbridge and ditch at the foot of the walls.

In the middle of the beautiful paved yard is a well which is 62 meters depth and 2 meters in diameter cut with stone 1.20 metres thick. Simon de Montfort, 5th Earl of Leicester allotted the village of Lagarde and its castle to Guy I of Lévis, lieutenant of his army, in 1212. This was conducted after Simon de Montfort convened at Pamiers in a general meeting of nobles, prelates and noted middle-class men, where they drew up a 46 article administration doctrine of the place. It was ratified by the Treaty of Paris and signed on 12 April 1229 on the square of Notre-Dame.

== Population ==
Historical population
Year	Pop.	±% p.a.
1968	213	—
1975	185	−1.99%
1982	177	−0.63%
1990	172	−0.36%
1999	194	+1.35%
2007	181	−0.86%
2012	182	+0.11%
2017	194	+1.29%
2023	217	+1.88%
Source: INSEE

== See also ==
- Communes of the Ariège department
