= Jardin botanique Pierre Fabre du Bosc dal Mas =

Botanical garden in Tarn, Midi-Pyrénées, France

Coordinates: 43°36′N 2°15′E

The Jardin botanique Pierre Fabre du Bosc dal Mas, also known as the Conservatoire botanique Pierre Fabre, is a private botanical garden maintained by the nonprofit Institut Klorane. It is located road of Cambounet-sur-le-Sor, Soual, Castres, Tarn, Midi-Pyrénées, France.

The garden was established by Pierre Fabre, who in 1965 acquired Klorane, a small company near Paris specializing in the manufacture of soaps, and subsequently built it into a large commercial success. In 1994 he created the nonprofit Institut Klorane to help protect the environment, and in 2001 the institute opened the garden and conservatory in Fabre's home town of Castres with the missions of scientific study, preservation of endangered species, and public education.

Today the garden contains more than 900 plant species, with an emphasis on medicinal, cosmetic, and edible plants, on a site that includes a former mansion, conservatory greenhouses, and outdoor garden (5000 m²). The greenhouse includes a tropical room (120 species), Mediterranean room, and arid room for cactus and succulents.

== See also ==
- List of botanical gardens in France
