= Les Martres =

Les Martres may refer to:

- Les Martres-d'Artière : French commune situated in the département of Puy-de-Dôme
- Les Martres-de-Veyre : French commune situated in the département of Puy-de-Dôme

== See also ==
- Martres
- La Martre (disambiguation)
