= Pierre Fabre =

Pierre Fabre may refer to:

- Pierre Fabre (businessman), cosmetics executive who founded Laboratoires Pierre Fabre
  - Laboratoires Pierre Fabre, a multinational pharmaceutical and cosmetics company founded in France
- Pierre Fabre, president of US-based Lone Signal
- Pierre Fabre (actor) (1933–2006), French actor and screenwriter, married to Anna Karina
