= Vincent Baron =

French theologian (1604–1674)

Vincent Baron (17 May 1604 – 21 January 1674) was a French Dominican theologian and preacher.

== Biography ==
He was born at Martres, in the département of the Haute-Garonne, France, 17 May 1604, and died in Paris on 21 January 1674. At the age of seventeen he passed from the college of the Jesuits in Toulouse to the Dominican convent of St. Thomas in the same city. He made his religious profession there on 16 May 1622, where he also completed his course in philosophy and theology, and taught these subjects.

As early as 1634 he was first professor in his convent and conventual doctor in the University of Toulouse. Rare erudition, depth of thought and clearness of exposition earned for him the reputation of being one of the leading theologians of France.

While discharging his professorial duties he delivered courses of Lenten sermons in the principal churches of Toulouse, Avignon, Bordeaux and other cities of Southern France. Upon the invitation of the bishops of Languedoc he preached throughout their dioceses for ten years, reviving the faith of Catholics, elevating their morals, and combating the doctrine of the Calvinists, with whose ministers he frequently joined in open debate, sometimes in their public synods. In the pulpit Father Baron was always a teacher; but while intent upon forming the minds of his hearers he won their hearts by his disinterestedness, sincerity and charity.

From 1630 to 1659 he filled the office of prior in the convents of Toulouse (twice), Rhodez, Castres, Albi and Avignon and in the general novitiate in Paris, always promoting the reforms in study and religious observance inaugurated by Sebastien Michaelis in the first years of the century. In 1660, having declined the office of provincial in the Province of Toulouse, he was sent by the master-general of his order to make a canonical visitation of the Portuguese convents. On his return to Paris he devoted himself during the remaining fourteen years of his life to the composition of theological works.

== Works ==
He published an abridgment of his controversies with Lutheranism under the title "L'heresie convaincue" (Paris, 1668). His only surviving sermons to Catholic congregations are those preached at Paris in 1658 and 1659 (Paris, 1660), doctrinal discourses and panegyrics, composed in the forced style and manner of his age.

His most important productions were written to satisfy the desire expressed by Pope Alexander VII to the Dominicans assembled in a general chapter at Rome in 1656, that they should publish a course in moral theology conformable to the doctrine of St. Thomas Aquinas, and thus correct the laxity of morals encouraged by certain casuists. These works were:

- (1) "Theologiae Moralis adv. Laxiores probabilistas pars prior" (Paris, 1665);
- (2) "Manuductionis ad Moralem Theologiam pars altera" (Paris, 1665);
- (3) "Theologia moralis Summa bipartita" (Paris, 1667).

In these works, while condemning opinions that seemed too lax, and censuring others that appeared to be too rigorous, he defended the system of Probabiliorism.

With Jean de Launoy he was long in controversy as to the Summa Theologiae of Thomas Aquinas, the authenticity of which he ably defended, although he did not demonstrate it, as later writers have done. The manuscript of a work entitled "Apologia pro sacra congregatione Indicis" having been published with alterations made by a stranger, which brought upon it the condemnation of the Sacred Congregation, he promised a new edition, which was embodied in his "SS. Augustini et Thomae vera et una mens de libertate humana" (Paris, 1666).

Another work is his "Libri V apologetici pro religione, utraque theologia, moribus ac juribus Ord. Praed." (Paris, 1666).

At the time of his death he was engaged on a complete course in theology to be entitled "D. Thomas sui Interpres". From this work, but half completed and never published, the one bearing the same title by Antoninus Massoulié, O.P., is entirely distinct.
