= Tour de Navès =

Fortified tower in Navès, Tarn, France

Coordinates: 43°33′27″N 2°13′41″E

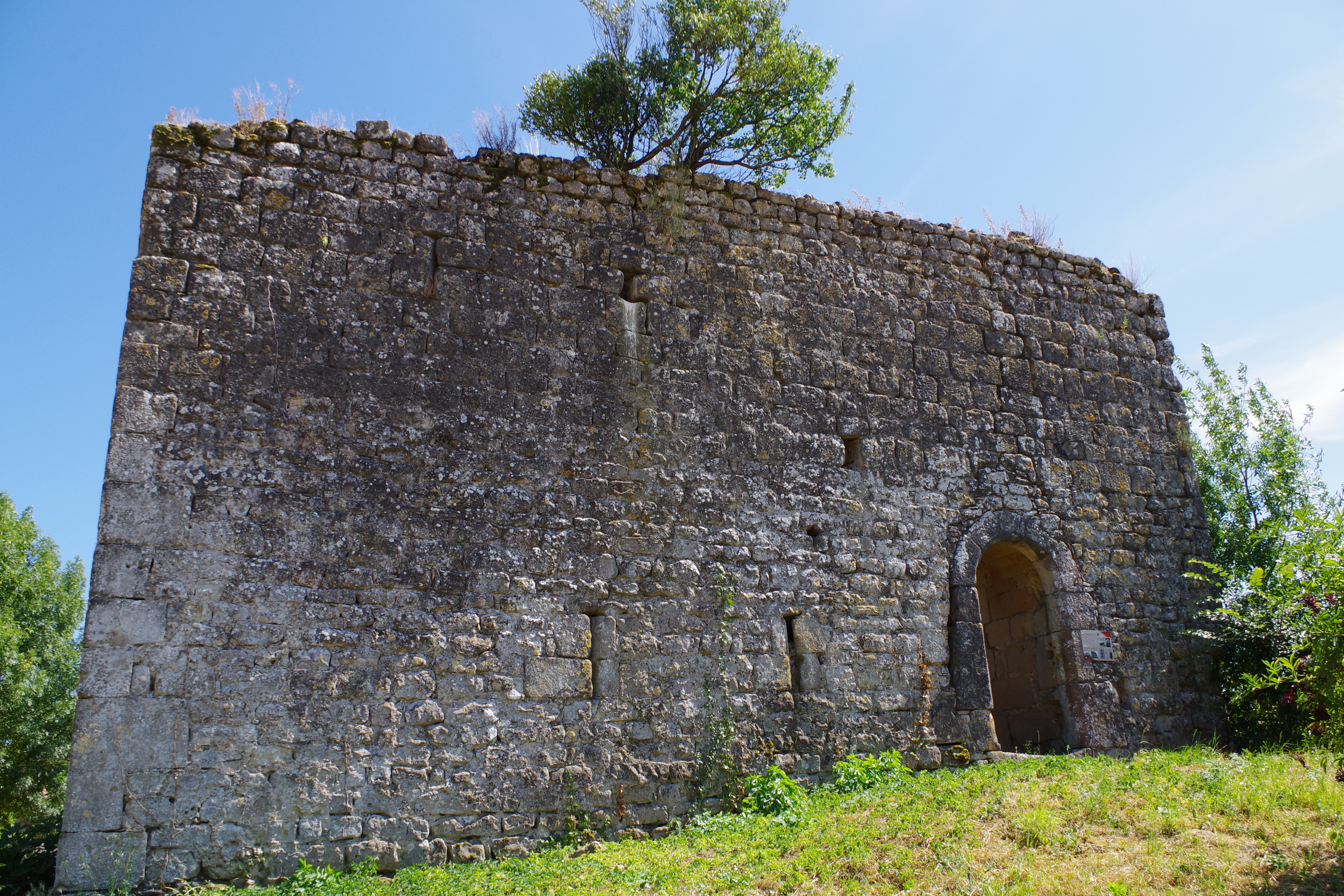
Northwest façade

The tour de Navès is a fortified tower constructed from the 16th century, located in the commune of Navès in the Tarn département of France.

It was listed as a monument historique on 30 August 1995.

== History ==
There is evidence that in the 10th or 11th century the site was protected by wooden stakes. In the 13th century, it was owned by the Saint-Benoîts of Castres. During the French Wars of Religion, Protestants occupied the site and restored its defence. The tower is built on the rock with a moat. Its layout is similar to a village defence fort and there is no sign today of domestic or functional facilities. The loopholes permit a cross-fire defence and cannot predate the invention of firearms, suggesting that the building was rebuilt in the 16th or early 17th century. Post holes in the ground could be evidence of a half-timbered structure.
