= Château de Montespieu =

Medieval fortress in Navès in the Tarn département of France

Coordinates: 43°33′18″N 2°13′20″E

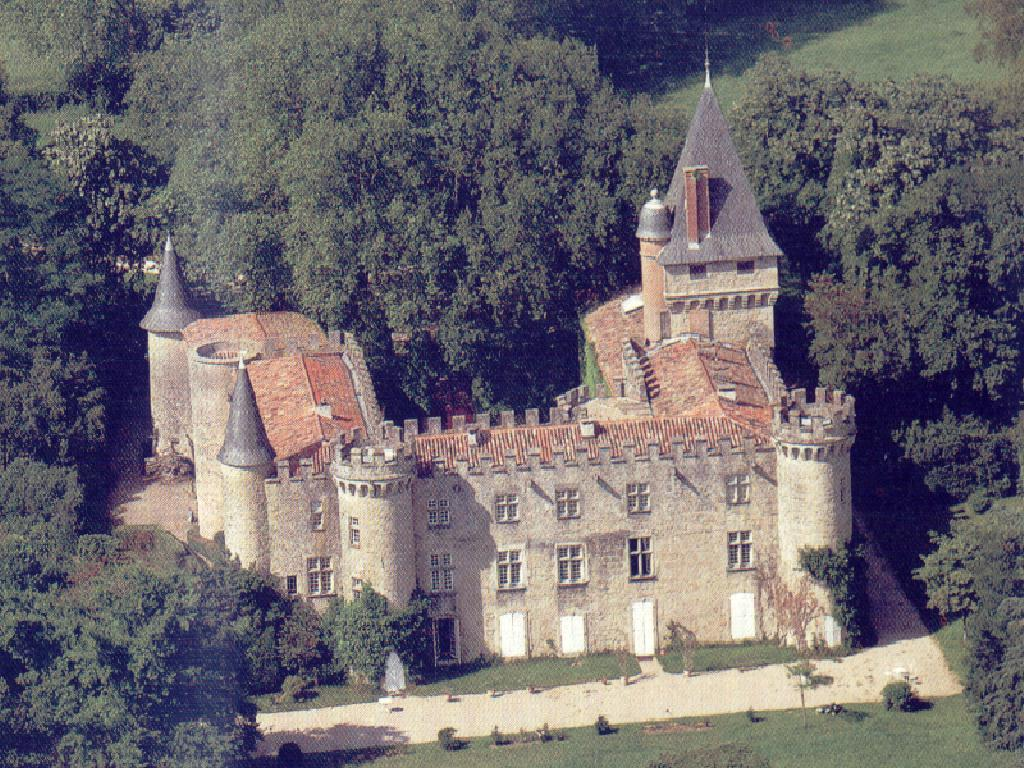
Château de Montespieu

The Château de Montespieu is an early medieval fortress in the commune of Navès in the Tarn département of France. Constructed on foundations dating back to the 12th century, it was entirely rebuilt in the 16th century, remodeled in the 17th century and then restored in 1900.

It has been listed as a monument historique since 26 October 1992.

== History ==
=== 12th-15th centuries ===
The seigneurie of Montespieu originally belonged to the knights of Caudière, recorded from the beginning of the 13th century, with the first known lord being Pierre I of Caudière2. At the end of the following century, it passed to the family of Hue or Hugues.

=== 16th century ===
It is known that around 1508, the early castle, wrongly located in documents about a league from the present castle, was in ruins. The current castle was built around 1510 by Pierre III of Huc and his sons enlarged the domain. The seigneurie passed by marriage to the Padiès family. Following this marriage, a lawsuit took place which gives a faithful description of the state of the castle in 1554.

Subsequently, the castle passed to the barons de Montfa branch of the Toulouse-Lautrec family. In 1570, Montespieu was looted and burned by the king's army, probably in the context of the Wars of Religion. On 23 January 1590, Marguerite de Sales, the widow of Jean de Nadal, Lord of Lacrouzette, was caught in a trap and murdered three leagues from Montespieu with one of her daughters and a servant by one of her servants. On 19 July 1591, there was a scuffle between the Viscount and Baron de Montfa and the inhabitants of Labruguière who suspected the Toulouse-Lautrecs of being part of the Catholic League. Duke Henri I de Montmorency, governor of Castres imprisoned the two lords for a short time but he soon released them without a ransom and the viscount retired to Montespieu.

On 21 March 1592, a soldier from Labruguière, named Bonavene, having been ill-treated by the Viscount of Montfa and having obtained an order from Montmorency, took a small force and stormed the castle of Montespieu. However, the viscount was able to escape him. Finally, in the same year, Montespieu was again looted and burned.

=== 17th century to today ===
On 23 May 1600, Montespieu was acquired by Abel de Suc, reformed president of the Edict Chamber of Castres. A document dated 17 September 1664 indicates the repairs to be made to the castle as well as a detailed description of the building: the ditches are shown as well as the dovecote, and the entrance is indicated to the east. The Sucs were succeeded by the Scorbiac family and, in 1680, Antoine de Juge, Lord of Fabrègues, acquired Montespieu by preemption.

The French Revolution caused some damage to Montespieu since the battlements were levelled, but Paul de Juge undertook to restore the castle at the end of the 19th century. The architect Henri-Paul Nénot undertook this vast project in 1896. This Protestant family kept the castle and the estate until 1964 when Henriette de Juge de Montespieu died.

The castle and its grounds including the dovecote were listed as a monument historique on 26 October 1992. It is used as a venue for weddings and other events.

== Architecture ==
The castle is a vast rectangle which presents the characteristics of an early medieval fortress. It is flanked by seven towers, 14 to 15 metres high, three in the main body and four with pavilions built at right angles.

== See also ==
- List of castles in France
