= Lescout =

- Commune
- Coat of arms
- Location of Lescout
- Location within France Location within Occitanie
- Coordinates: 43°32′19″N 2°06′21″E
- Country: France
- Region: Occitania
- Department: Tarn
- Arrondissement: Castres
- Canton: Le Pastel
- Intercommunality: Sor et Agout

Government
  - Mayor (2020–2026): Serge Gavalda
- Area^{1}: 6.72 km^{2} (2.59 sq mi)
- Elevation: 171 m (561 ft)
- Highest elevation: 223 m (732 ft)
- Lowest elevation: 165 m (541 ft)
- Population (2023): 764
  - Density: 114/km^{2} (294/sq mi)
- Time zone: UTC+01:00 (CET)
  - Summer (DST): UTC+02:00 (CEST)
- INSEE/Postal code: 81143 /81110
- ^{1} French Land Register data, which excludes lakes, ponds, glaciers > 1 km^{2} (0.386 sq mi or 247 acres) and river estuaries.

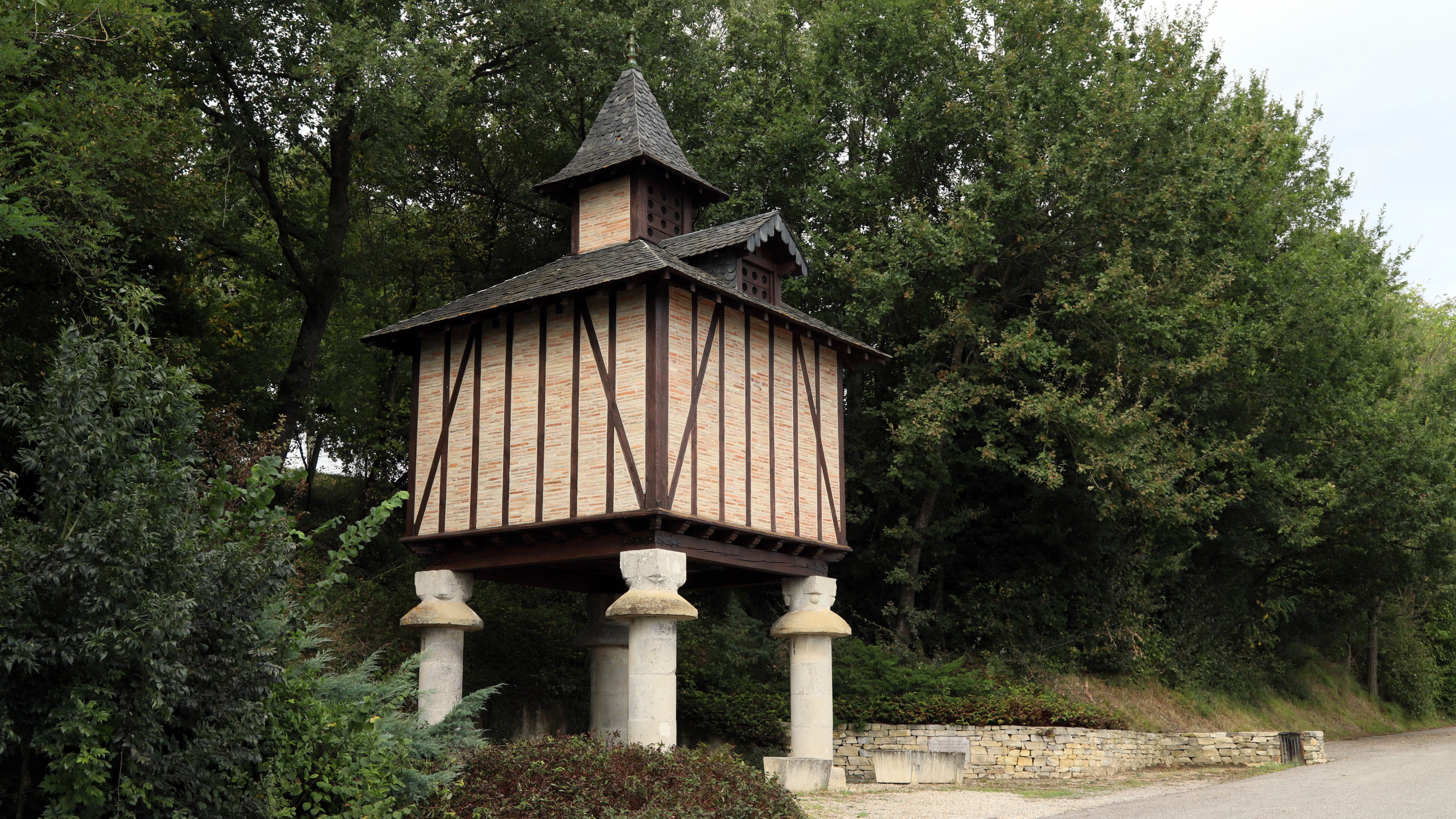
Lescout

Lescout (Occitan: L'Escost) is a commune in the Tarn department in southern France.

== See also ==
- Communes of the Tarn department
