= Saïx =

- Commune
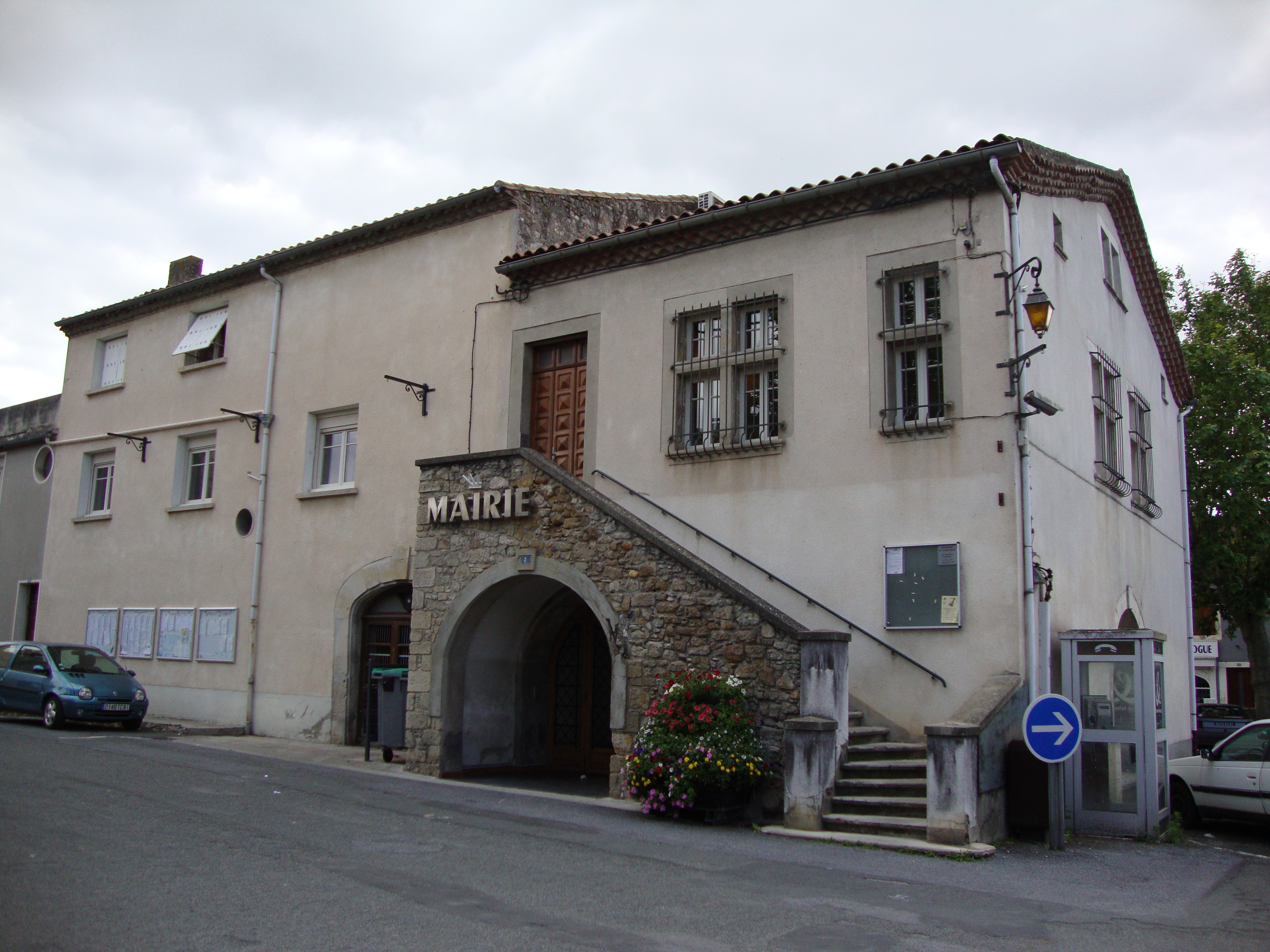
- The town hall in Saïx

- Coat of arms
- Location of Saïx
- Location within France Location within Occitanie
- Coordinates: 43°34′56″N 2°11′05″E
- Country: France
- Region: Occitania
- Department: Tarn
- Arrondissement: Castres
- Canton: Le Pastel
- Intercommunality: CC du Sor et de l'Agout

Government
  - Mayor (2020–2026): Jacques Armengaud
- Area^{1}: 13.79 km^{2} (5.32 sq mi)
- Elevation: 165 m (541 ft)
- Highest elevation: 263 m (863 ft)
- Lowest elevation: 147 m (482 ft)
- Population (2023): 3,748
  - Density: 271.8/km^{2} (703.9/sq mi)
- Time zone: UTC+01:00 (CET)
  - Summer (DST): UTC+02:00 (CEST)
- INSEE/Postal code: 81273 /81710
- ^{1} French Land Register data, which excludes lakes, ponds, glaciers > 1 km^{2} (0.386 sq mi or 247 acres) and river estuaries.

Saïx (French pronunciation: [sajs]; Occitan: Sais, [ˈsajs]) is a commune in the Tarn department, Occitania, southern France.

== Population ==
Historical population
Year	Pop.	±% p.a.
1968	1,361	—
1975	1,646	+2.75%
1982	2,252	+4.58%
1990	2,900	+3.21%
1999	3,277	+1.37%
2007	3,332	+0.21%
2012	3,329	−0.02%
2017	3,548	+1.28%
2023	3,748	+0.92%
Source: INSEE

== See also ==
- Communes of the Tarn department
