= Appelle =

- Commune
- Coat of arms
- Location of Appelle
- Location within France Location within Occitanie
- Coordinates: 43°34′57″N 1°57′16″E
- Country: France
- Region: Occitania
- Department: Tarn
- Arrondissement: Castres
- Canton: Le Pastel
- Intercommunality: Sor et Agout

Government
  - Mayor (2020–2026): Christophe Pouyanne
- Area^{1}: 3.87 km^{2} (1.49 sq mi)
- Elevation: 230 m (750 ft)
- Highest elevation: 340 m (1,120 ft)
- Lowest elevation: 228 m (748 ft)
- Population (2023): 66
  - Density: 17/km^{2} (44/sq mi)
- Time zone: UTC+01:00 (CET)
  - Summer (DST): UTC+02:00 (CEST)
- INSEE/Postal code: 81015 /81700
- ^{1} French Land Register data, which excludes lakes, ponds, glaciers > 1 km^{2} (0.386 sq mi or 247 acres) and river estuaries.

Appelle (French pronunciation: [apɛl]; Occitan: Apèla) is a commune in the Tarn department in southern France.

== See also ==
- Communes of the Tarn department
