= Saint-Germain-des-Prés, Tarn =

Saint-Germain-des-Prés
- Commune
- Coat of arms
- Location of Saint-Germain-des-Prés
- Location within France Location within Occitanie
- Coordinates: 43°33′44″N 2°03′57″E
- Country: France
- Region: Occitania
- Department: Tarn
- Arrondissement: Castres
- Canton: Le Pastel
- Intercommunality: CC du Sor et de l'Agout

Government
  - Mayor (2020–2026): Raymond Frede
- Area^{1}: 16.97 km^{2} (6.55 sq mi)
- Elevation: 220 m (720 ft)
- Highest elevation: 350 m (1,150 ft)
- Lowest elevation: 165 m (541 ft)
- Population (2023): 928
  - Density: 54.7/km^{2} (142/sq mi)
- Time zone: UTC+01:00 (CET)
  - Summer (DST): UTC+02:00 (CEST)
- INSEE/Postal code: 81251 /81700
- ^{1} French Land Register data, which excludes lakes, ponds, glaciers > 1 km^{2} (0.386 sq mi or 247 acres) and river estuaries.

Saint-Germain-des-Prés (French pronunciation: [sɛ̃ ʒɛʁmɛ̃ de pʁe]; Occitan: Sant German dels Prats) is a commune in the Tarn department in southern France.

Its inhabitants are called Saint-Germinois.

== See also ==
- Communes of the Tarn department
