= Saint-Sernin-lès-Lavaur =

- Commune
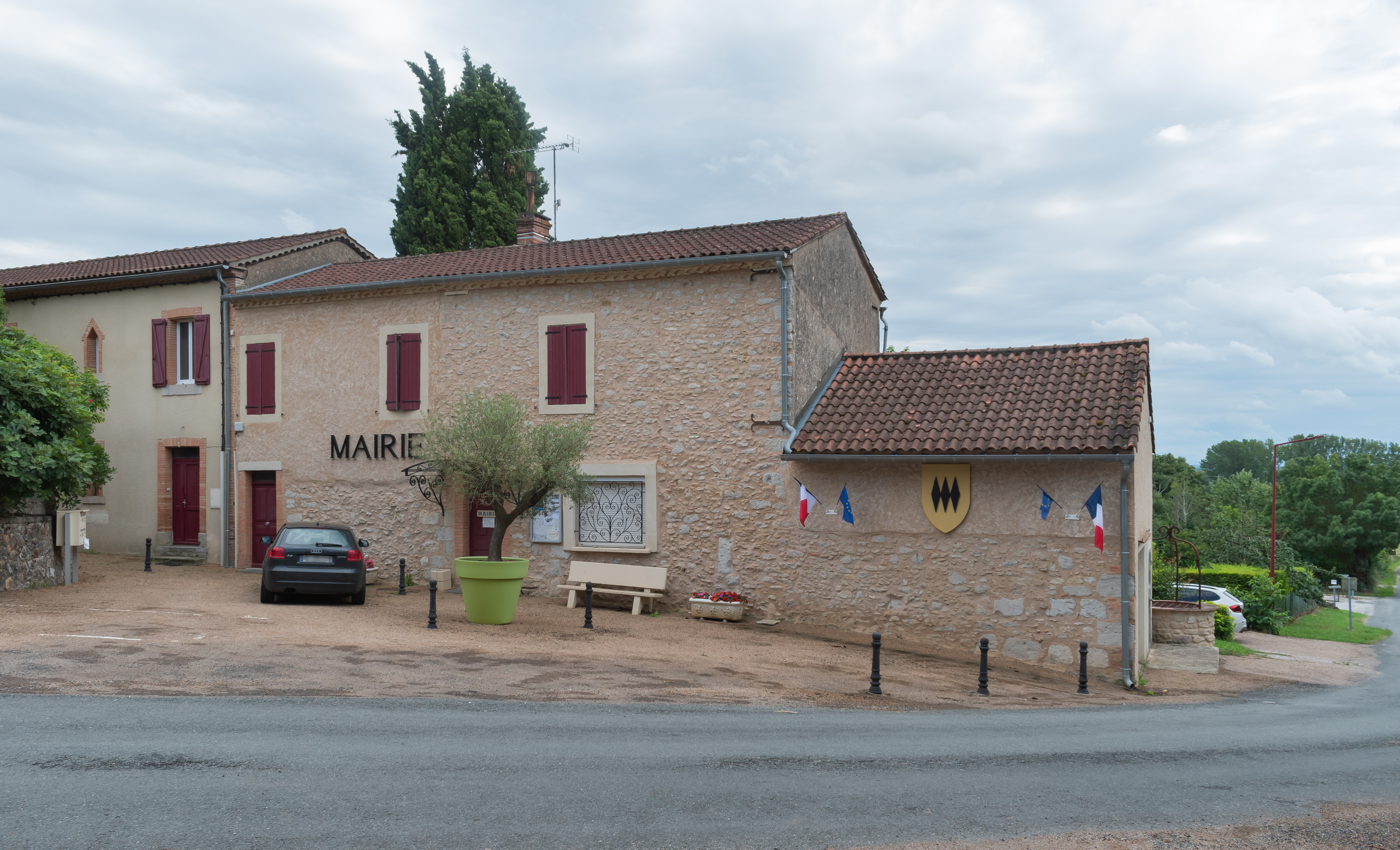
- Town hall

- Coat of arms
- Location of Saint-Sernin-lès-Lavaur
- Location within France Location within Occitanie
- Coordinates: 43°32′56″N 1°58′29″E
- Country: France
- Region: Occitania
- Department: Tarn
- Arrondissement: Castres
- Canton: Le Pastel

Government
  - Mayor (2020–2026): Patrice Biezus
- Area^{1}: 4.21 km^{2} (1.63 sq mi)
- Elevation: 210 m (690 ft)
- Highest elevation: 275 m (902 ft)
- Lowest elevation: 187 m (614 ft)
- Population (2023): 167
  - Density: 39.7/km^{2} (103/sq mi)
- Time zone: UTC+01:00 (CET)
  - Summer (DST): UTC+02:00 (CEST)
- INSEE/Postal code: 81270 /81700
- ^{1} French Land Register data, which excludes lakes, ponds, glaciers > 1 km^{2} (0.386 sq mi or 247 acres) and river estuaries.

Saint-Sernin-lès-Lavaur (French pronunciation: [sɛ̃ sɛʁnɛ̃ lɛ lavɔʁ]; Occitan: Sant Sarnin de la Vaur) is a commune in the Tarn department in southern France.

== See also ==
- Communes of the Tarn department
