= Navès, Tarn =

Navès
- Commune
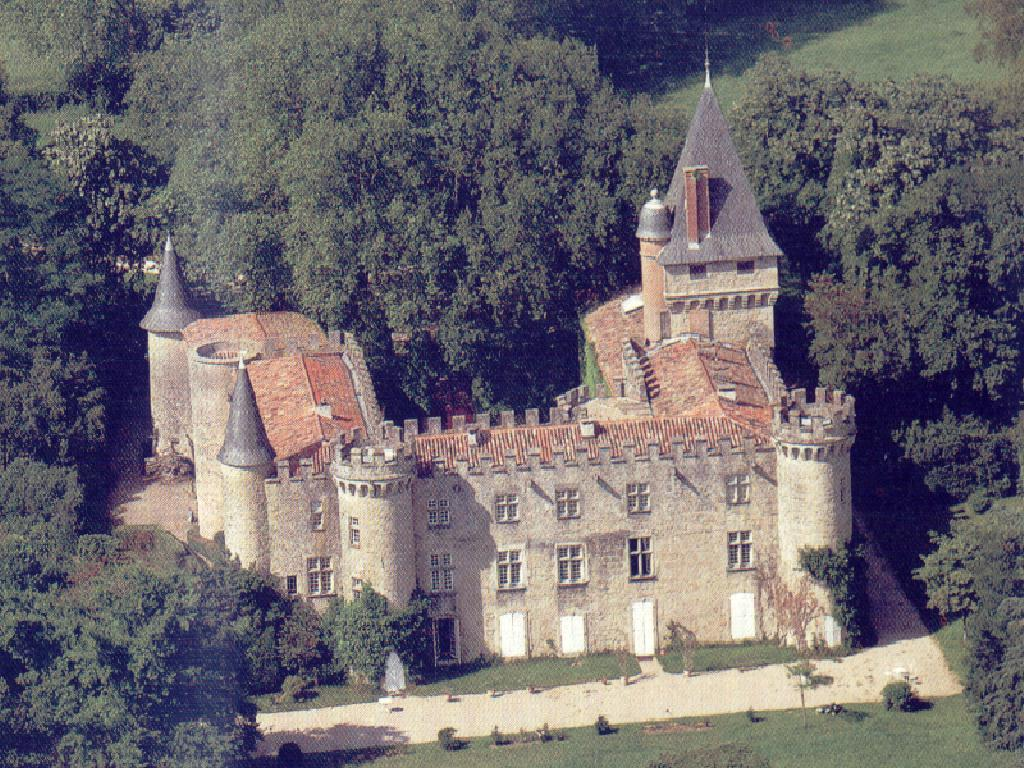
- Château de Montespieu

- Coat of arms
- Location of Navès
- Location within France Location within Occitanie
- Coordinates: 43°34′01″N 2°13′28″E
- Country: France
- Region: Occitania
- Department: Tarn
- Arrondissement: Castres
- Canton: Castres-3
- Intercommunality: CA Castres Mazamet

Government
  - Mayor (2020–2026): Pierre Calmels
- Area^{1}: 9.75 km^{2} (3.76 sq mi)
- Elevation: 176 m (577 ft)
- Highest elevation: 286 m (938 ft)
- Lowest elevation: 158 m (518 ft)
- Population (2023): 690
  - Density: 71/km^{2} (180/sq mi)
- Time zone: UTC+01:00 (CET)
  - Summer (DST): UTC+02:00 (CEST)
- INSEE/Postal code: 81195 /81710
- ^{1} French Land Register data, which excludes lakes, ponds, glaciers > 1 km^{2} (0.386 sq mi or 247 acres) and river estuaries.

Navès (French pronunciation: [navɛs]; Occitan: Navés) is a commune in the Tarn department in southern France.

== Geography ==
The Thoré forms most of the commune's north-eastern border, then flows into the Agout, which forms part of its northern border.

== Historic sites ==
- Château de Montespieu, restored castle, listed as a monument historique in 1992.
- Château de Navès (residence of Georges Prêtre)
- The manoir de Gaillard and its classified dovecote
- Tour de Navès, fortified 16th-century tower, listed as a monument historique in 1995.
- Church of Saint John the Baptiste

== Notable people ==
- Georges Prêtre (1924 – 2017), orchestral and opera conductor, had a home in Navès.

== See also ==
- Communes of the Tarn department
