= Bertre =

- Commune
- Coat of arms
- Location of Bertre
- Location within France Location within Occitanie
- Coordinates: 43°35′59″N 1°56′27″E
- Country: France
- Region: Occitania
- Department: Tarn
- Arrondissement: Castres
- Canton: Le Pastel
- Intercommunality: Sor et Agout

Government
  - Mayor (2020–2026): Bernard Pinel
- Area^{1}: 4.14 km^{2} (1.60 sq mi)
- Elevation: 240 m (790 ft)
- Highest elevation: 330 m (1,080 ft)
- Lowest elevation: 224 m (735 ft)
- Population (2023): 112
  - Density: 27.1/km^{2} (70.1/sq mi)
- Time zone: UTC+01:00 (CET)
  - Summer (DST): UTC+02:00 (CEST)
- INSEE/Postal code: 81030 /81700
- ^{1} French Land Register data, which excludes lakes, ponds, glaciers > 1 km^{2} (0.386 sq mi or 247 acres) and river estuaries.

Bertre (French pronunciation: [bɛʁtʁ]; Occitan: Bèrtre) is a village and commune of the Tarn department of southern France.

== See also ==
- Communes of the Tarn department
