= Garrevaques =

- Commune
- Coat of arms
- Location of Garrevaques
- Location within France Location within Occitanie
- Coordinates: 43°29′27″N 1°58′54″E
- Country: France
- Region: Occitania
- Department: Tarn
- Arrondissement: Castres
- Canton: Le Pastel
- Intercommunality: CC aux sources du Canal du Midi

Government
  - Mayor (2020–2026): Alain Albouy
- Area^{1}: 6.86 km^{2} (2.65 sq mi)
- Elevation: 190 m (620 ft)
- Highest elevation: 214 m (702 ft)
- Lowest elevation: 183 m (600 ft)
- Population (2023): 398
  - Density: 58.0/km^{2} (150/sq mi)
- Time zone: UTC+01:00 (CET)
  - Summer (DST): UTC+02:00 (CEST)
- INSEE/Postal code: 81100 /81700
- ^{1} French Land Register data, which excludes lakes, ponds, glaciers > 1 km^{2} (0.386 sq mi or 247 acres) and river estuaries.

Garrevaques (French pronunciation: [ɡaʁvak]; Occitan: En Garravacas) is a commune in the Tarn department and Occitanie region of southern France.

== See also ==
- Communes of the Tarn department
