= Boffille de Juge =

Boffille de Juge (died 1502), French-Italian adventurer and statesman, belonged to the family of del Giudice, which came from Amalfi, and followed the fortunes of the Angevin dynasty. When John of Anjou, duke of Calabria, was conquered in Italy (1461) and fled to Provence, Boffille followed him. He was given by Duke John and his father, King René, the charge of upholding by force of arms their claims on Catalonia.

Louis XI, who had joined his troops to those of the princes of Anjou, attached Boffille to his own person, made him his chamberlain and conferred on him the vice-royalty of Roussillon and Cerdanya (1471), together with certain important lordships, among others the county of Castres, confiscated from Jacques d'Armagnac, duke of Nemours (1476), and the temporalities of the bishopric of Castres, confiscated from John of Armagnac. He also entrusted him with diplomatic negotiations with Flanders and England.

In 1480 Boffille married Marie d'Albret, sister of Alain I of Albret le Grand, thus confirming the feudal position which the king had given him in the south. He was appointed as one of the judges in the trial of René of Alençon, and showed such zeal in the discharge of his functions that Louis XI rewarded him by fresh gifts. However, the bishop of Castres recovered his diocese (1483), and the heirs of the duke of Nemours took legal proceedings for the recovery of the county of Castres.

Boffille, with the object of escaping from his enemies, applied for the command of the armies of the republic of Venice. His application was refused, and he further lost the viceroyalty of Roussillon (1491). His daughter Louise married against his will a gentleman of no rank, and this led to terrible family dissensions. In order to disinherit his own family, Boffille de Juge gave up the county of Castres to his brother-in-law, Alain d'Albret (1494). He died in 1502.
