= Puylaurens =

- Commune
- Coat of arms
- Location of Puylaurens
- Location within France Location within Occitanie
- Coordinates: 43°34′22″N 2°00′46″E
- Country: France
- Region: Occitania
- Department: Tarn
- Arrondissement: Castres
- Canton: Le Pastel

Government
  - Mayor (2020–2026): Jean-Louis Hormière
- Area^{1}: 81.82 km^{2} (31.59 sq mi)
- Elevation: 335 m (1,099 ft)
- Highest elevation: 372 m (1,220 ft)
- Lowest elevation: 147 m (482 ft)
- Population (2023): 3,257
  - Density: 39.81/km^{2} (103.1/sq mi)
- Time zone: UTC+01:00 (CET)
  - Summer (DST): UTC+02:00 (CEST)
- INSEE/Postal code: 81219 /81700
- ^{1} French Land Register data, which excludes lakes, ponds, glaciers > 1 km^{2} (0.386 sq mi or 247 acres) and river estuaries.

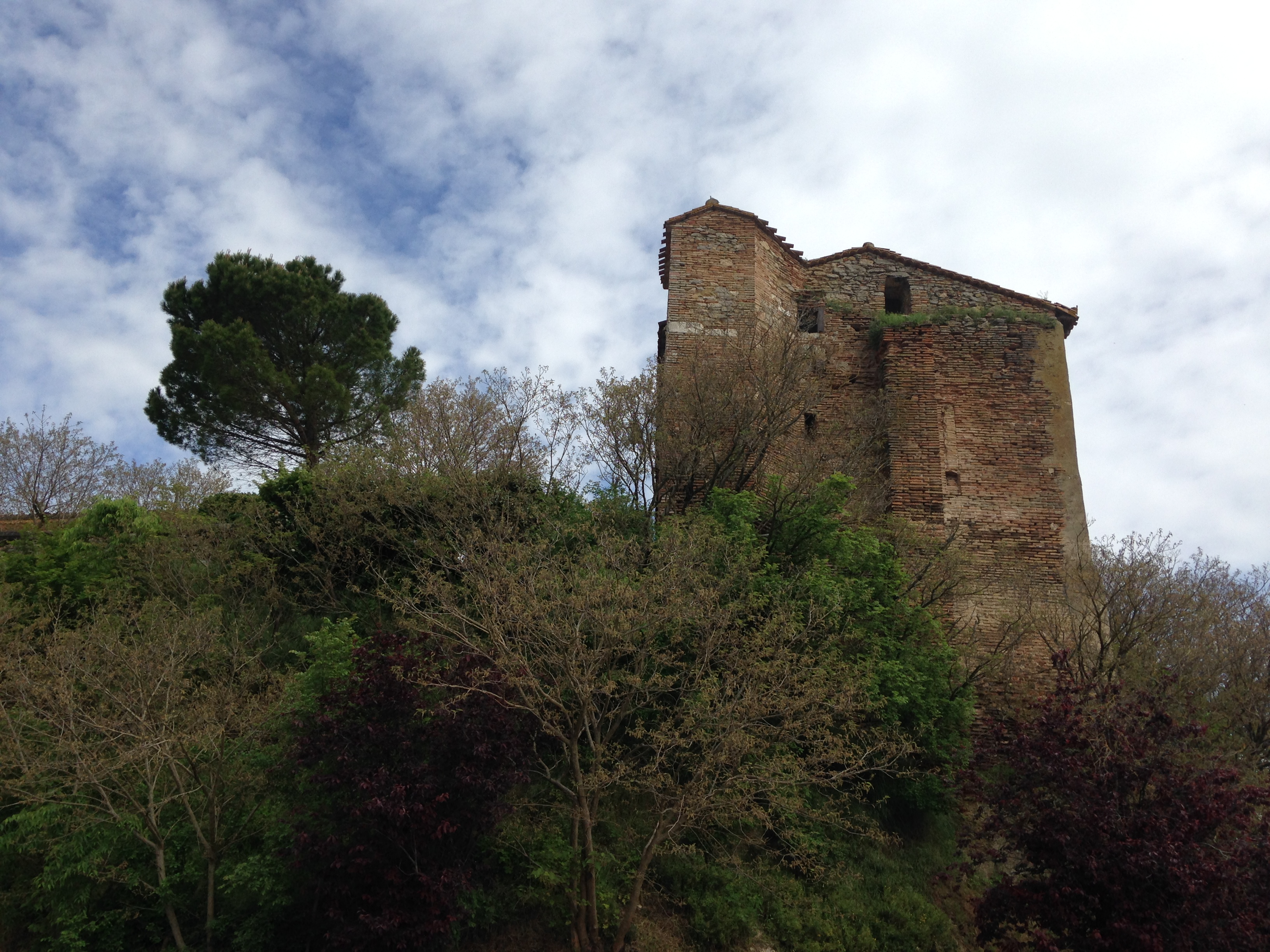
Puylaurens

Puylaurens (French pronunciation: [pɥiloʁɛ̃s]; Occitan: Puèglaurenç) is a commune in the Tarn department in southern France. The poet Suzon de Terson was born here in 1657. The commune is listed as a Village étape.

== Heraldry ==
Coat of arms of Puylaurens	Argent, a laurel tree eradicated vert, on a chief azure three fleurs-de-lis or, supported by a fess of the same.

== Population ==
Historical population
Year	Pop.	±% p.a.
1968	2,936	—
1975	2,782	−0.77%
1982	2,778	−0.02%
1990	2,708	−0.32%
1999	2,792	+0.34%
2007	2,968	+0.77%
2012	3,239	+1.76%
2017	3,236	−0.02%
2023	3,257	+0.11%
Source: INSEE

== See also ==
- Communes of the Tarn department
