= Palace of the Bishops of Castres =

Town hall in Castres, France

The Palace of the Bishops of Castres
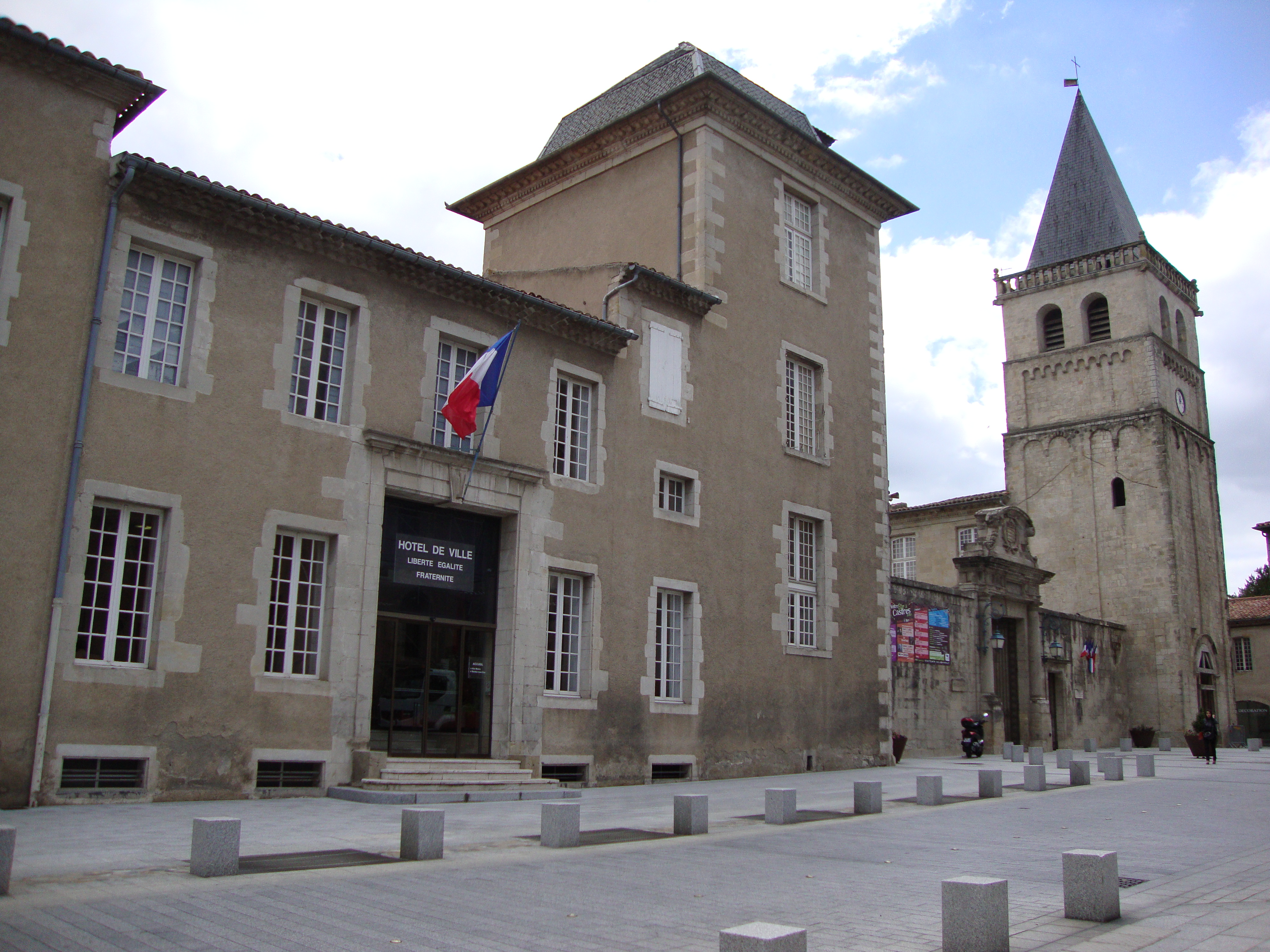
- The main frontage of the building in June 2010

General information
- Type: City hall
- Architectural style: Neoclassical style
- Location: Castres, France
- Coordinates: 43.6037°N 2.2418°E
- Completed: 1673

Design and construction
- Architect: Jules Hardouin-Mansart

Monument historique
- Official name: Ancien palais épiscopal
- Type: Inscrit
- Designated: 1927
- Reference no.: PA00095519

The Palace of the Bishops of Castres, or Palais de l'Evêché à Castres, is a municipal building in Castres, Tarn, in southern France, standing on Rue de l'Hôtel de ville. It was designated a monument historique by the French government in 1927.

== History ==
The palace was originally intended to provide residential accommodation for the bishops of Castres and was erected to the south of Castres Cathedral. Little remains of an earlier palace, which was commissioned in the 14th century and survived for over three centuries until completion of the current building.

The current palace was commissioned by Bishop Michel de Tubœuf in 1666 and construction started in 1668. It was designed by Jules Hardouin-Mansart in the neoclassical style, built in ashlar stone and was completed in 1673. The palace was laid out as a typical hôtel particulier with a grand gate, a grand courtyard and two ornate façades. The northwestern corner of the courtyard incorporated the Saint-Benoît tower, which dated from a Benedictine abbey established on the site in the 7th century. On the south side there was a long façade of 13 bays facing onto a garden. A landscaped garden was commissioned by a later bishop, Augustin de Maupeou, laid out to a design by the landscape architect, André Le Nôtre, and completed in around 1700.

During the French Revolution the palace was seized by the state and the bishop and his staff were driven out. It was acquired by the new town council in 1794, and initially used to accommodate the prefecture. The eastern wing of the building was subsequently converted for municipal use by the town council. A museum was established in a room on the first floor in 1840 and, after the library relocated, it expanded to three rooms in 1887. After the painter, Marcel Briguiboul, bequeathed paintings by Francisco Goya and other Hispanic artists in 1894, the museum started to specialise in Hispanic works. In 1947, after a series of additional Hispanic works were transferred from the Louvre, the museum became known as the Musée Goya Castres (Goya Museum).

Following completion of an extensive programme of refurbishment works, involving over 20 rooms, the museum re-opened on 15 April 2023.
