= Poudis =

- Commune
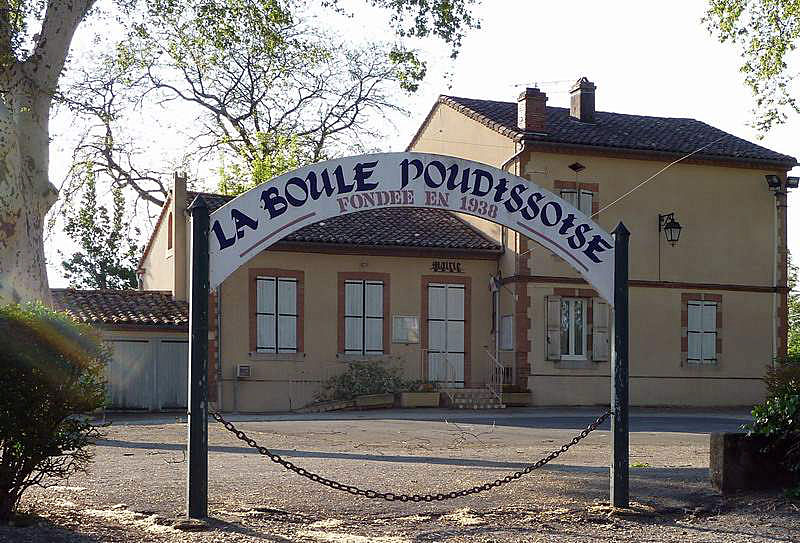

- Coat of arms
- Location of Poudis
- Location within France Location within Occitanie
- Coordinates: 43°31′18″N 1°59′07″E
- Country: France
- Region: Occitania
- Department: Tarn
- Arrondissement: Castres
- Canton: Le Pastel
- Intercommunality: CC aux sources du Canal du Midi

Government
  - Mayor (2020–2026): Véronique Ourliac
- Area^{1}: 4.62 km^{2} (1.78 sq mi)
- Elevation: 180 m (590 ft)
- Highest elevation: 215 m (705 ft)
- Lowest elevation: 179 m (587 ft)
- Population (2023): 272
  - Density: 58.9/km^{2} (152/sq mi)
- Time zone: UTC+01:00 (CET)
  - Summer (DST): UTC+02:00 (CEST)
- INSEE/Postal code: 81210 /81700
- ^{1} French Land Register data, which excludes lakes, ponds, glaciers > 1 km^{2} (0.386 sq mi or 247 acres) and river estuaries.

Poudis is a commune in the Tarn department in southern France.

== See also ==
- Communes of the Tarn department
