= Canton of Castres-1 =

Coordinates: 43.61°N 2.24°E

The canton of Castres-1 is an administrative division of the Tarn department, southern France. It was created at the French canton reorganisation which came into effect in March 2015. Its seat is in Castres.

It consists of the following communes:

1. Castres (partly)
