= Canton of Le Pastel =

Coordinates: 43.58°N 2.18°E

The canton of Le Pastel is an administrative division of the Tarn department, southern France. It was created at the French canton reorganisation which came into effect in March 2015. Its seat is in Saïx.

It consists of the following communes:

1. Appelle
2. Bertre
3. Blan
4. Cambounet-sur-le-Sor
5. Garrevaques
6. Lempaut
7. Lescout
8. Palleville
9. Poudis
10. Puylaurens
11. Saint-Germain-des-Prés
12. Saint-Sernin-lès-Lavaur
13. Saïx
14. Soual
15. Viviers-lès-Montagnes
