= Suzon de Terson =

French poet

- Born: 1657; Puylaurens
- Died: 1685 (aged 27–28)
- Occupation: Poet

Suzon de Terson (1657–1685) was a 17th-century French poet.

== Biography ==
Suzon de Terson was born in 1657 in Puylaurens (currently part of the Tarn department) in a rich Protestant family and soon became passionate about poetic art.

By her worldly poems she drew the attention of Paul Pellisson and the circles of the Academy of Castres, then became "Dame Rivals" by her marriage with pastor Elie Rivals. In 1685, she died prematurely, following a long illness reflected in her poetry. Her writings were not published until 1968, by Christian Anatole.

She is the author of 81 poems including 15 written in the Occitan language.

== Works ==
Poësies diverses de Demoizelle Suzon de Terson: 1657-1685; French and Occitan texts established on the only known manuscript... by Christian Anatole (Lo Libre Occitan, 1968; Colleccion Fabri de Peiresc. - [Toulouse] : Institut d'Estudis Occitans) OCLC 489791092.

== Bibliography ==
- Suzon de Terson de Puylaurens (1657–1684), sa vie, son œuvre et son secret. Revue du Tarn numéro 2, 15 June 1956
- Marie France Hilgar, "Suzon de Terson", in Katharina M. Wilson, An Encyclopedia of continental women writers, 1st vol. (A-K), Taylor & Francis, 1991, p. 312-313.
