= Viviers-lès-Montagnes =

- Commune
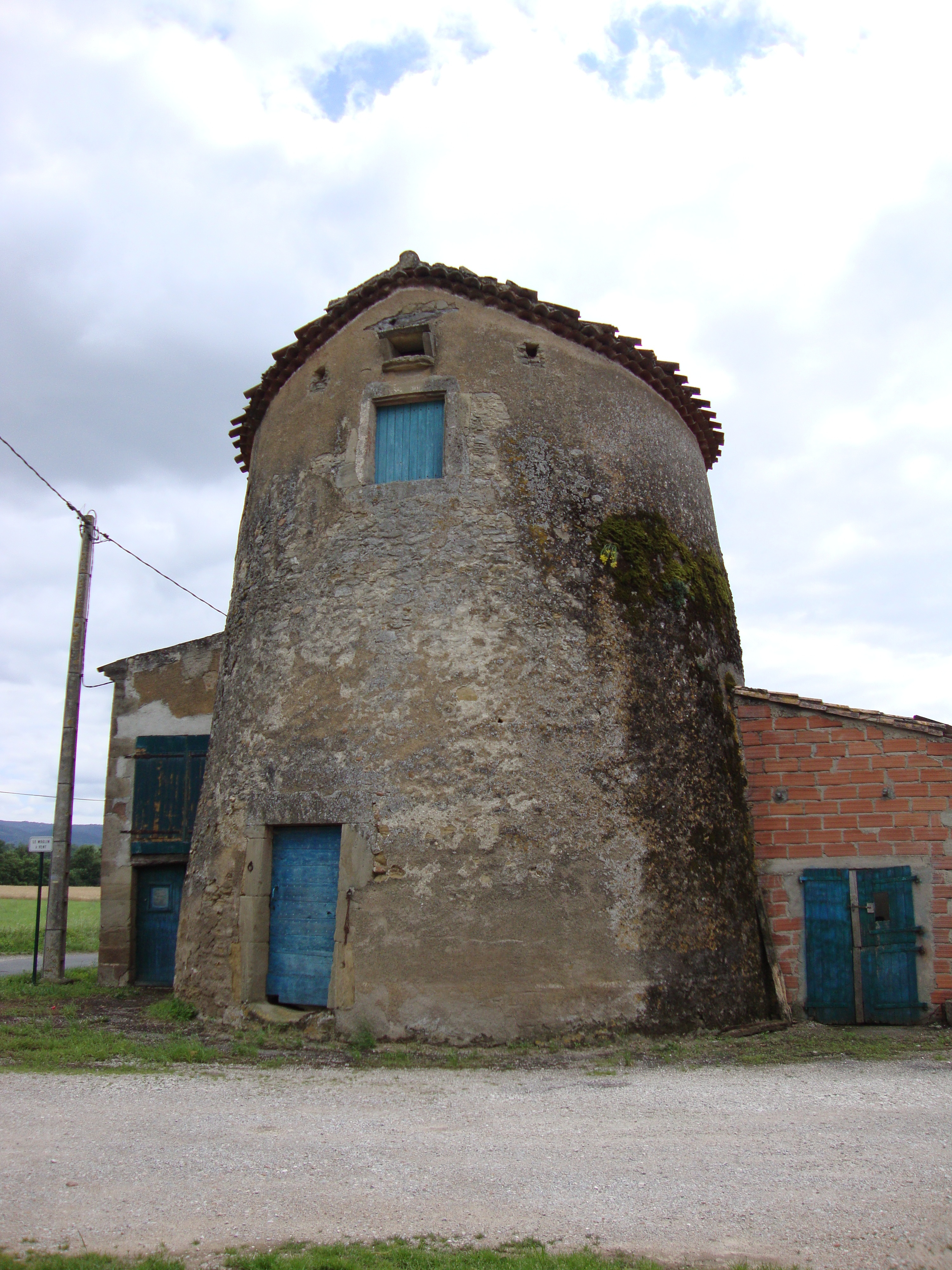
- The old windmill in Viviers-lès-Montagnes

- Coat of arms
- Location of Viviers-lès-Montagnes
- Location within France Location within Occitanie
- Coordinates: 43°33′20″N 2°10′38″E
- Country: France
- Region: Occitania
- Department: Tarn
- Arrondissement: Castres
- Canton: Le Pastel
- Intercommunality: Sor et Agout

Government
  - Mayor (2020–2026): Alain Veuillet
- Area^{1}: 17.91 km^{2} (6.92 sq mi)
- Elevation: 167 m (548 ft)
- Highest elevation: 281 m (922 ft)
- Lowest elevation: 167 m (548 ft)
- Population (2023): 2,008
  - Density: 112.1/km^{2} (290.4/sq mi)
- Time zone: UTC+01:00 (CET)
  - Summer (DST): UTC+02:00 (CEST)
- INSEE/Postal code: 81325 /81290
- ^{1} French Land Register data, which excludes lakes, ponds, glaciers > 1 km^{2} (0.386 sq mi or 247 acres) and river estuaries.

Viviers-lès-Montagnes (French pronunciation: [vivje lɛ mɔ̃taɲ]; Occitan: Vivièrs de las Montanhas) is a commune in the Tarn department in southern France.

== Population ==
Historical population
Year	Pop.	±% p.a.
1968	712	—
1975	870	+2.90%
1982	1,347	+6.44%
1990	1,473	+1.12%
1999	1,633	+1.15%
2007	1,676	+0.33%
2012	1,885	+2.38%
2017	1,930	+0.47%
2023	2,008	+0.66%
Source: INSEE

== See also ==
- Communes of the Tarn department
