= Palleville =

- Commune
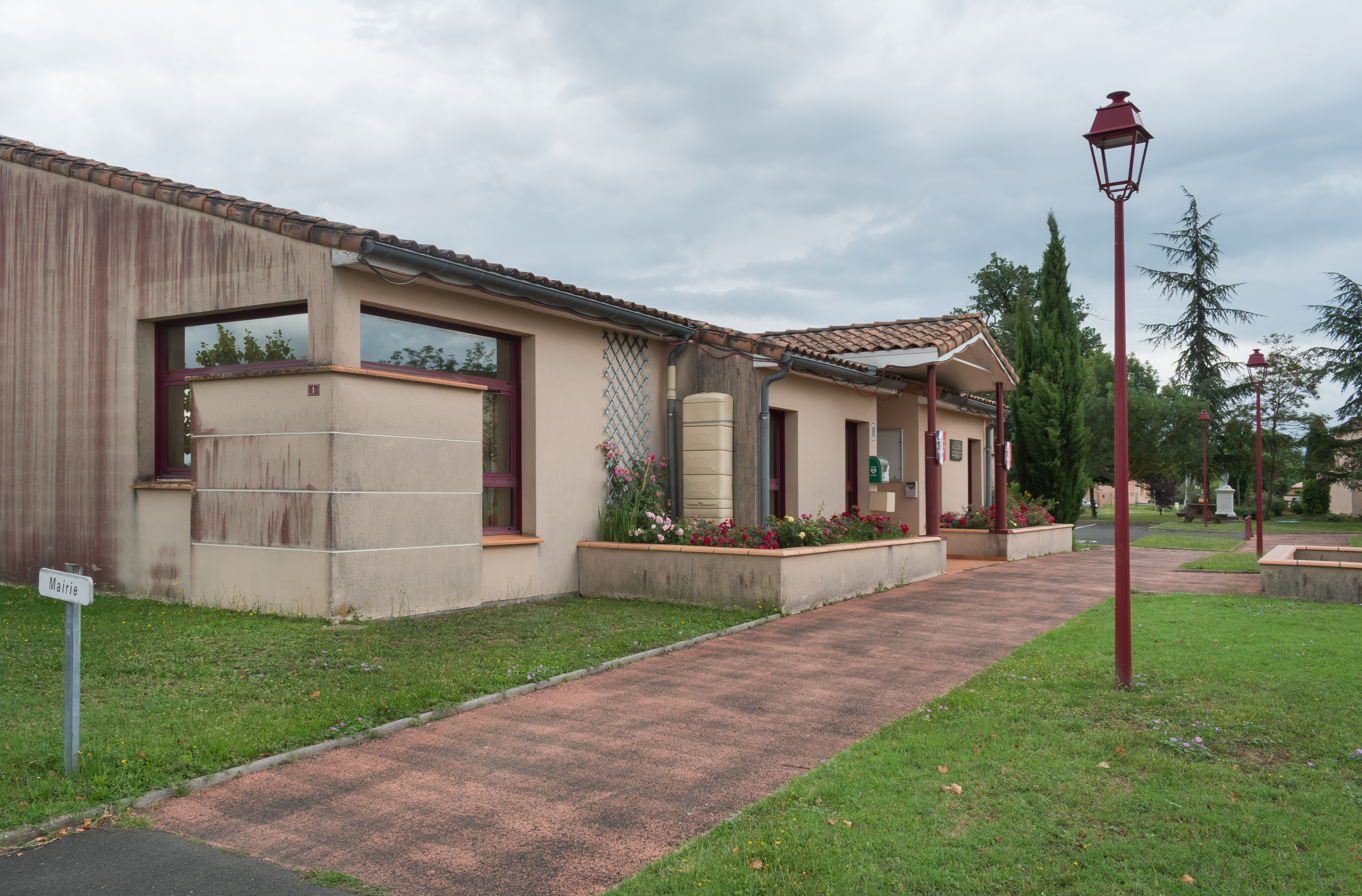
- Town hall of Palleville

- Coat of arms
- Location of Palleville
- Location within France Location within Occitanie
- Coordinates: 43°30′09″N 1°59′47″E
- Country: France
- Region: Occitania
- Department: Tarn
- Arrondissement: Castres
- Canton: Le Pastel
- Intercommunality: CC aux sources du Canal du Midi

Government
  - Mayor (2020–2026): Michel Hugonnet
- Area^{1}: 6.44 km^{2} (2.49 sq mi)
- Elevation: 200 m (660 ft)
- Highest elevation: 213 m (699 ft)
- Lowest elevation: 181 m (594 ft)
- Population (2023): 451
  - Density: 70.0/km^{2} (181/sq mi)
- Time zone: UTC+01:00 (CET)
  - Summer (DST): UTC+02:00 (CEST)
- INSEE/Postal code: 81200 /81700
- ^{1} French Land Register data, which excludes lakes, ponds, glaciers > 1 km^{2} (0.386 sq mi or 247 acres) and river estuaries.

Palleville (French pronunciation: [palvil]; Occitan: Palavila) is a commune in the Tarn department in southern France.

== See also ==
- Communes of the Tarn department
