= Cambounet-sur-le-Sor =

- Commune
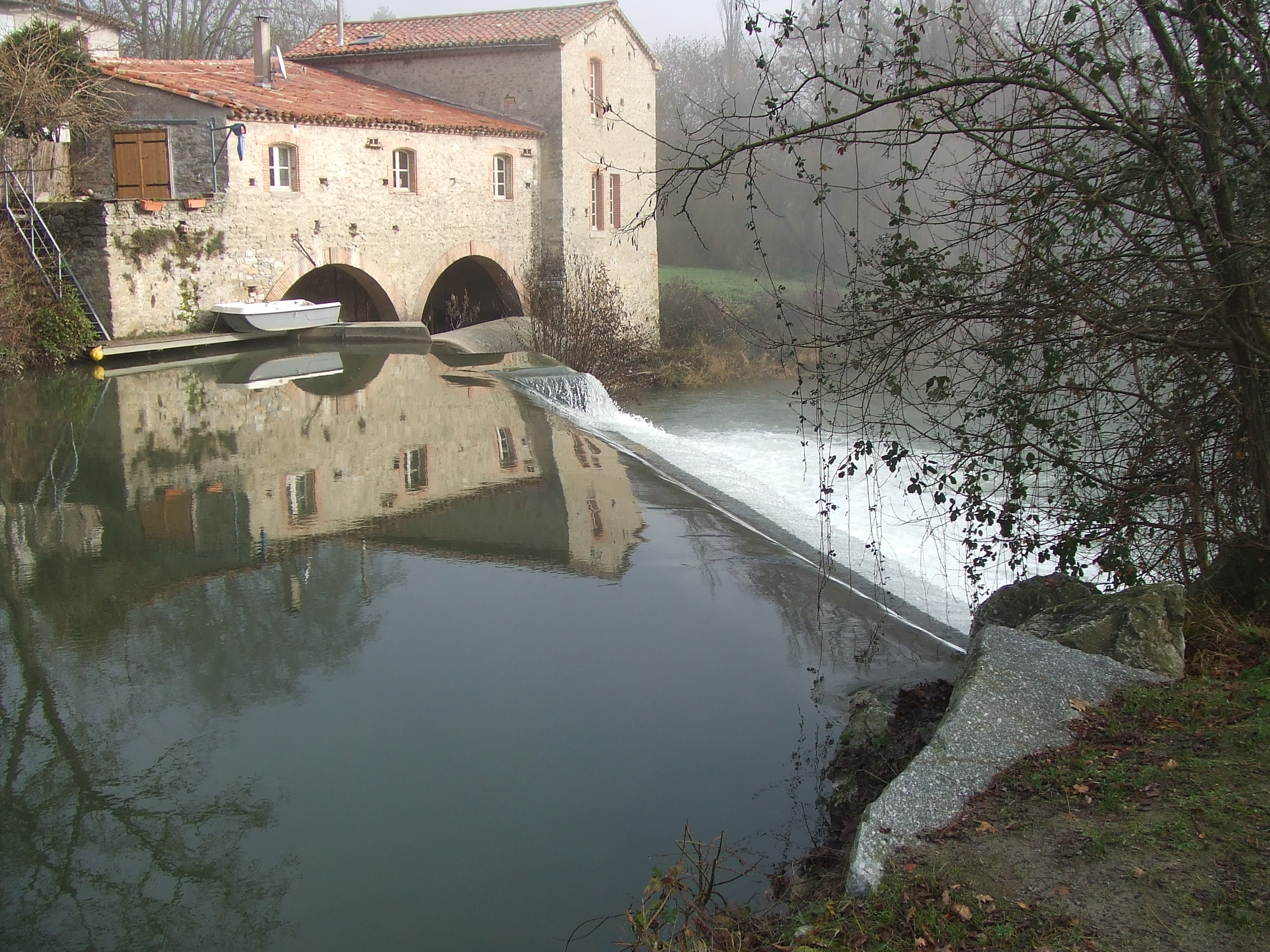
- The Sor river in Cambounet-sur-le-Sor

- Coat of arms
- Location of Cambounet-sur-le-Sor
- Location within France Location within Occitanie
- Coordinates: 43°34′41″N 2°06′49″E
- Country: France
- Region: Occitania
- Department: Tarn
- Arrondissement: Castres
- Canton: Le Pastel
- Intercommunality: Sor et Agout

Government
  - Mayor (2020–2026): Sylvain Fernandez
- Area^{1}: 7.65 km^{2} (2.95 sq mi)
- Elevation: 170 m (560 ft)
- Highest elevation: 250 m (820 ft)
- Lowest elevation: 158 m (518 ft)
- Population (2023): 978
  - Density: 128/km^{2} (331/sq mi)
- Time zone: UTC+01:00 (CET)
  - Summer (DST): UTC+02:00 (CEST)
- INSEE/Postal code: 81054 /81580
- ^{1} French Land Register data, which excludes lakes, ponds, glaciers > 1 km^{2} (0.386 sq mi or 247 acres) and river estuaries.

Cambounet-sur-le-Sor (French pronunciation: [kɑ̃bunɛ syʁ lə sɔʁ]; Occitan: Cambonet de Sòr) is a commune in the Tarn department in southern France.

== See also ==
- Communes of the Tarn department
