= Pierre Fabre (businessman) =

French pharmaceutical and cosmetics executive and pharmacist

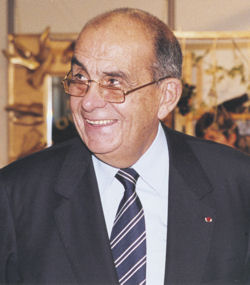
- Born: 16 April 1926; Castres, France
- Died: 20 July 2013 (aged 87); Lavaur, France
- Occupations: Entrepreneur; Founder Laboratoires Pierre Fabre

Pierre Jacques Louis Fabre (French pronunciation: [pjɛʁ fabʁ]; 16 April 1926 – 20 July 2013) was a French pharmaceutical and cosmetics executive and pharmacist, who founded Laboratoires Pierre Fabre in 1962. Fabre, a rugby enthusiast, was also the owner of Castres Olympique, a French rugby union club based in the city of Castres.

Fabre founded Laboratoires Pierre Fabre, a major multinational pharmaceutical and cosmetics company headquartered in Castres, in 1962. The company grossed 1.972 billion euros in revenue in 2012. It employs approximately 10,000 people, with 6,700 of those jobs based in France. The success of the company placed Fabre as France's 43rd richest man at the time of his death in 2013.

Fabre died in his home in Lavaur, Tarn department, on 20 July 2013, at the age of 87. The French employers' organisation, Mouvement des Entreprises de France, called his death "a huge loss." Castres Olympique's stadium was renamed as Stade Pierre-Fabre in memory of Fabre in 2017.
