= Laboratoires Pierre Fabre =

French multinational pharmaceutical and cosmetics company

Pierre Fabre S.A.

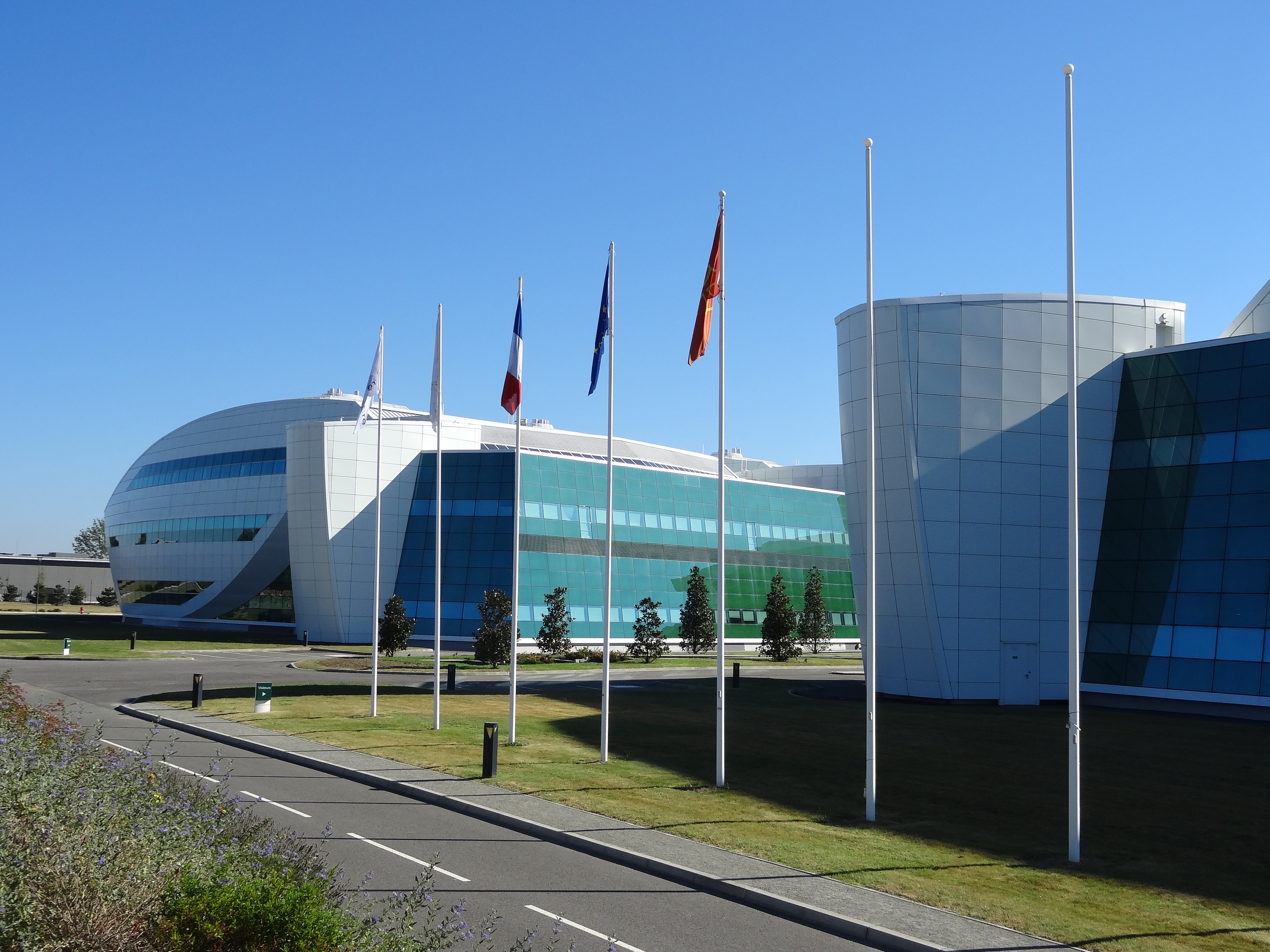
- Company type: Private limited company
- Industry: Pharmaceutical
- Founded: 1962
- Headquarters: Castres, France
- Area served: Worldwide
- Key people: Pierre Fabre; (Founder); Eric Ducournau; (President and CEO)
- Number of employees: 13,000 (2015) (Homepage)
- Website: www.pierre-fabre.com

Laboratoires Pierre Fabre (French pronunciation: [labɔʁatwaʁ pjɛʁ fabʁ]) is a French multinational pharmaceutical and cosmetics company headquartered in the city of Castres, Midi-Pyrénées, France.

== History ==
Founded in 1962 by Pierre Fabre (1926-2013), the company is present in over 130 countries.

In 1984, Pierre Fabre Dermatologie (PFD) was founded. In 1986, Pierre Fabre Japan was established as a joint venture with Shiseido. In 1989, vinorelbine received its marketing authorisation. Laboratoires Avène were also created. In 1990, the Avène thermal spa re-opened. The Pierre Fabre Immunology Centre in Saint-Julien-en-Genevois was inaugurated.

Olivier Bohuon was Chief Executive from September 2010 to April 2011.

In December 2014, the Group announced to trade unions the elimination of 551 positions in France (including nearly 200 in the Midi-Pyrénées region) and in Barcelona, during a central works council meeting. The Research & Development and Medical Promotion divisions were affected. A strategic plan entitled Trajectoires 2018 was launched. Although promises of internal redeployment were made for employees in Midi-Pyrénées, unions expressed concerns about potential layoffs.

In March 2025, Marie-Andrée Gamache was appointed head of the Pierre Fabre Medical Care division. In the autumn of the same year, the Pierre Fabre Group inaugurated its new headquarters, named "Campus Chartreuse", in Castres.

== Business ==
The company is focused on research, development, manufacturing and marketing of cosmetics, prescription medicines and family health products.

The company had a consolidated turnover of 1.978 billion euros in 2012 (including 54% international).

Laboratories Pierre Fabre had approximately 10,000 employees in 2012, 33% of whom are internationally based, while the remaining 6,700 employees were based in France.

== Products ==
Pierre Fabre is best known for its vinorelbine (Navelbine), an anticancer drug of the vinca alkaloid class.

They also developed vinflunine, a fluorinated vinca alkaloid derivative available in Australia for "advanced or metastatic transitional cell carcinoma of the urothelial tract after failure of a prior platinum containing regimen."

== Patents ==
- Pierre Fabre holds a patent for the combination of ciclopirox olamine and piroctone olamine. These two active substances are highly effective when used together, creating a powerful treatment for dandruff and seborrheic dermatitis.

== The Pierre Fabre Foundation ==
The Pierre Fabre Foundation was recognized as a public utility in 1999, and its mission is to enable communities from less advanced and emerging countries, as well as those plunged into severe crisis by political or economic upheaval and/or natural disaster, to access the quality and levels of everyday health care and the widely-used drugs defined by the WHO and other organisations as essential to human health.
