= La Martre =

La Martre (French for "the marten") may refer to the following places:

- La Martre, Var, a commune in the Var department, France
- La Martre, Quebec, a municipality in Quebec, Canada
- Lac La Martre, lake in the Northwest Territories, Canada
