= Soual =

- Commune
- Coat of arms
- Location of Soual
- Location within France Location within Occitanie
- Coordinates: 43°33′22″N 2°07′02″E
- Country: France
- Region: Occitania
- Department: Tarn
- Arrondissement: Castres
- Canton: Le Pastel
- Intercommunality: CC du Sor et de l'Agout

Government
  - Mayor (2020–2026): Jean-Luc Alibert
- Area^{1}: 14.17 km^{2} (5.47 sq mi)
- Highest elevation: 220 m (720 ft)
- Lowest elevation: 163 m (535 ft)
- Population (2023): 2,637
  - Density: 186.1/km^{2} (482.0/sq mi)
- Time zone: UTC+01:00 (CET)
  - Summer (DST): UTC+02:00 (CEST)
- INSEE/Postal code: 81289 /81580
- ^{1} French Land Register data, which excludes lakes, ponds, glaciers > 1 km^{2} (0.386 sq mi or 247 acres) and river estuaries.

Soual (French pronunciation: [swal]; Occitan: Soal) is a commune in the Tarn department in southern France.

== Population ==
Historical population
Year	Pop.	±% p.a.
1968	1,244	—
1975	1,459	+2.30%
1982	1,717	+2.35%
1990	1,990	+1.86%
1999	1,987	−0.02%
2007	2,152	+1.00%
2012	2,395	+2.16%
2017	2,549	+1.25%
2023	2,637	+0.57%
Source: INSEE

== See also ==
- Communes of the Tarn department
