= Castres =

Castres Castras (Occitan)
- Subprefecture and commune
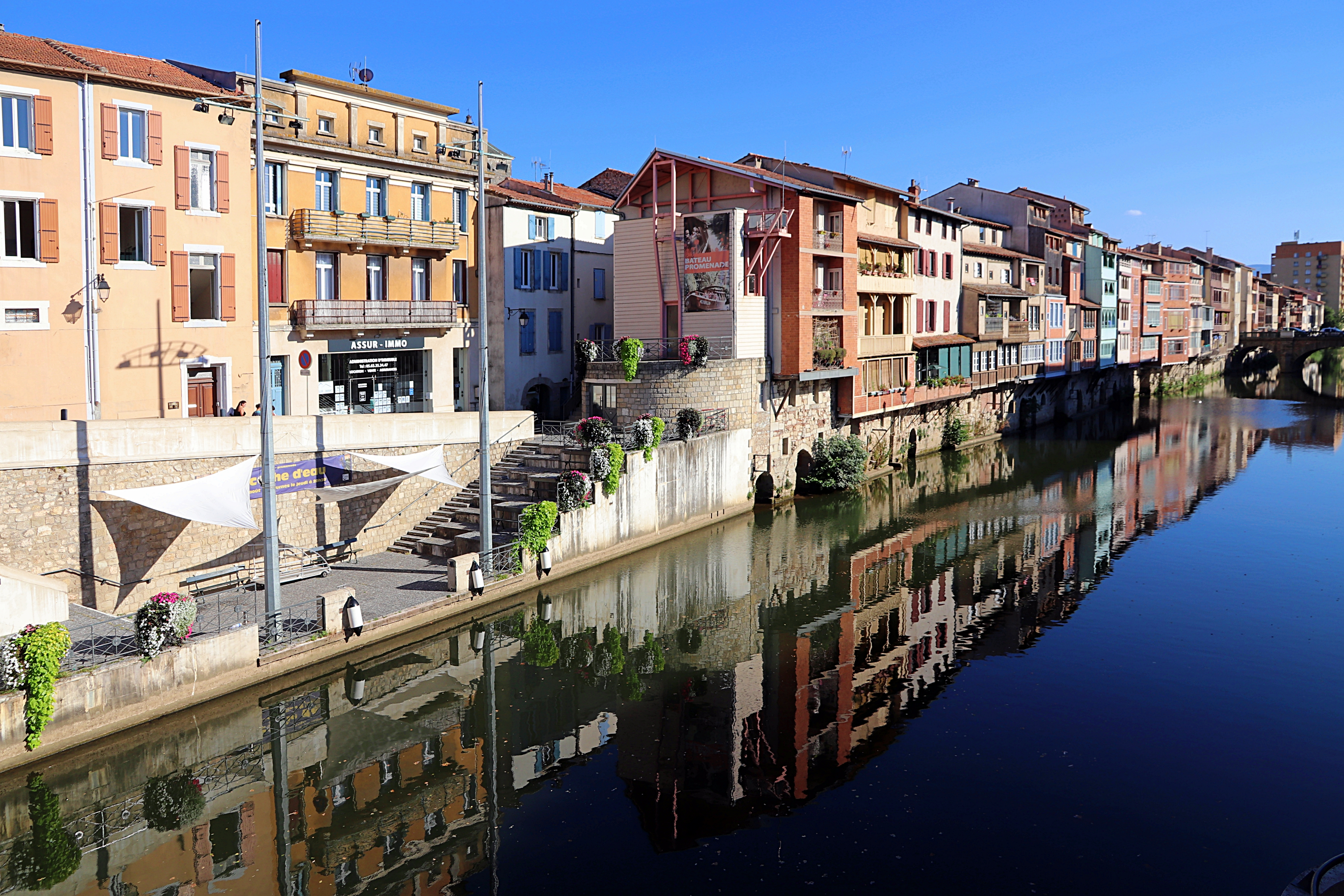
- Houses by the Agout

- Coat of arms
- Location of Castres
- Location within France Location within Occitanie
- Coordinates: 43°36′00″N 2°15′00″E
- Country: France
- Region: Occitania
- Department: Tarn
- Arrondissement: Castres
- Canton: Castres-1, 2 and 3
- Intercommunality: CA Castres Mazamet

Government
  - Mayor (2020–2026): Pascal Bugis (DVD)
- Area^{1}: 98.17 km^{2} (37.90 sq mi)
- Elevation: 170 m (560 ft)
- Highest elevation: 367 m (1,204 ft)
- Lowest elevation: 151 m (495 ft)
- Population (2023): 42,505
  - Density: 433.0/km^{2} (1,121/sq mi)
- Demonym: Castrais
- Time zone: UTC+01:00 (CET)
  - Summer (DST): UTC+02:00 (CEST)
- INSEE/Postal code: 81065 /81100
- ^{1} French Land Register data, which excludes lakes, ponds, glaciers > 1 km^{2} (0.386 sq mi or 247 acres) and river estuaries.

Castres (French: [kastʁ]; Castras in the Languedocian dialect of Occitan) is the sole subprefecture of the Tarn department in the Occitanie region in Southern France. It lies in the former province of Languedoc, although not in the former region of Languedoc-Roussillon. As of 2023, the population of the commune was 42,505.

Castres is the fourth-largest industrial centre of the predominantly rural former Midi-Pyrénées region after Toulouse, Tarbes and Albi, as well as the largest in the part of Languedoc lying between Toulouse and Montpellier. It is noted for being the birthplace of the famous socialist leader Jean Jaurès (1859–1914) and home to the important Goya Museum of Spanish painting.

== Demographics ==
In 1831, the population of Castres was 12,032, making it the largest town of the department of Tarn. One of the few industrial towns in the region of Albigeois, the population of the commune proper grew to 19,483 in 1901, and 34,126 by 1954. However, with the decline of its industries, population growth diminished. Albi surpassed Castres as the most populous metropolitan area of Tarn. The population of Castres reached its peak in 1975, after that it has been decreasing slowly. Castres is the centre of a functional urban area with 104,695 inhabitants (2019).

Historical population

Year	Pop.	±% p.a.
1793	12,327	—
1800	15,171	+3.01%
1806	13,717	−1.67%
1831	16,418	+0.72%
1836	17,602	+1.40%
1841	19,225	+1.78%
1846	20,651	+1.44%
1851	20,815	+0.16%
1856	22,062	+1.17%
1861	21,538	−0.48%
1866	21,357	−0.17%
1872	23,461	+1.58%
1876	25,856	+2.46%
1881	27,408	+1.17%
1886	27,427	+0.01%
1891	27,509	+0.06%
1896	28,204	+0.50%
1901	27,308	−0.64%

Year	Pop.	±% p.a.
1906	28,272	+0.70%
1911	27,830	−0.31%
1921	25,943	−0.70%
1926	27,028	+0.82%
1931	28,084	+0.77%
1936	29,133	+0.74%
1946	30,781	+0.55%
1954	34,126	+1.30%
1962	36,978	+1.01%
1968	40,457	+1.51%
1975	45,978	+1.84%
1982	45,578	−0.12%
1990	44,812	−0.21%
1999	43,496	−0.33%
2007	43,347	−0.04%
2012	41,529	−0.85%
2017	41,636	+0.05%
2023	42,505	+0.34%

Source: EHESS and INSEE (1968–2023)

== Geography ==
Castres is located at an altitude of 172 metres (564 feet) above sea level. It is located 45 km (28 mi) south-southeast of Albi, the préfecture (capital) of Tarn, and 79 km (49 mi) east of Toulouse, the capital of Occitania. Castres is intersected from north to south by the rivers Agout and Durenque.

The Thoré forms most of the commune's south-eastern border, then flows into the Agout, which forms part of its western border.

== Administration ==
Between 1790 and 1797 Castres was the prefecture of Tarn.

Since 2001, the mayor of Castres has been Pascal Bugis (right, member of UMP), who defeated the then socialist mayor in the 2001 election after a campaign focused on the bad records of the socialist mayor on fighting crime, and the high level of insecurity in the town.

Castres has teamed up with the nearby town of Mazamet (22 kilometres (14 miles) southeast of Castres) and the independent suburbs and villages in between to create the communauté d'agglomération de Castres Mazamet, which was established in December 1999. The communauté d'agglomération groups 14 independent communes (including Castres and Mazamet), with a total population of 78,101 inhabitants (2018), 54% of these living in the commune of Castres proper, 13% in the commune of Mazamet, and the rest in the communes in between.

The communauté d'agglomération was created in order to better coordinate transport, infrastructure, housing, and economic policies between the communes of the area. The current president of the communauté d'agglomération is Pascal Bugis, mayor of Castres.

== History ==
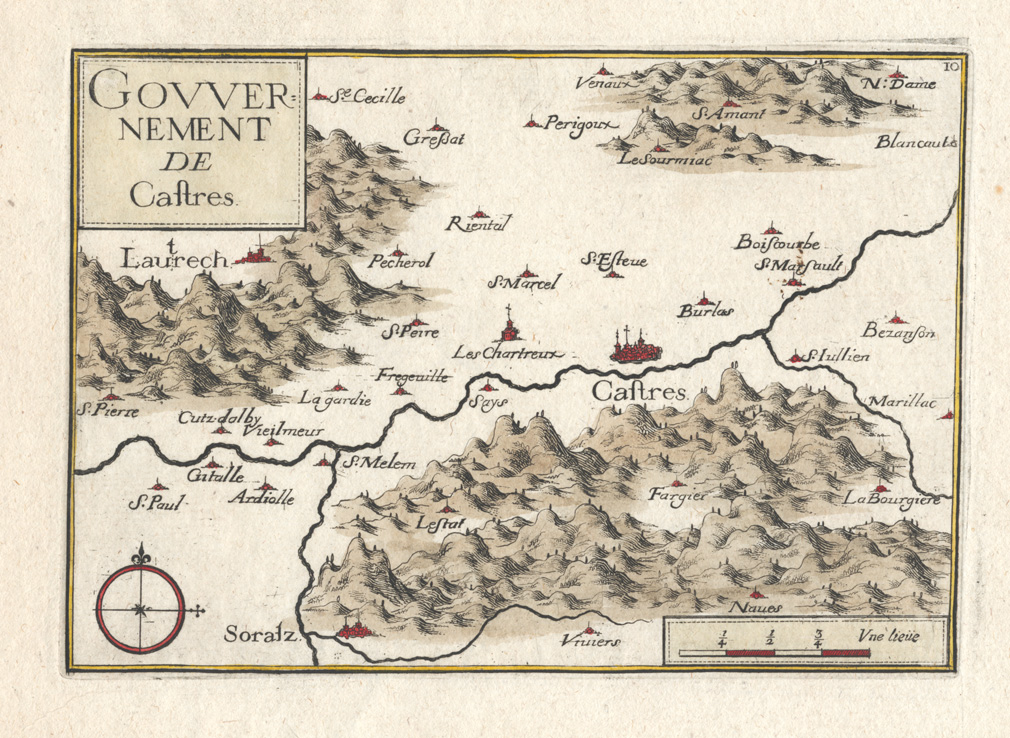
Map showing Castres and the surrounding region, 1638.

The name of the town comes from Latin castrum and means "fortified place". Castres grew up round the Benedictine abbey of Saint Benoît, which is believed to have been founded in AD 647, possibly on the site of an old Roman fort (castrum). Castres became an important stop on the international pilgrimage routes to Santiago de Compostela in Spain because its abbey-church, built in the 9th century, was keeping the relics of Saint Vincent, the renowned martyr of Spain. It was a place of some importance as early as the 12th century, and ranked as the second town of the Albigeois behind Albi. Despite the decline of its abbey, which in 1074 came under the authority of Saint Victor abbey in Marseille, Castres was granted a liberal charter in the 12th century by the famous Trencavel family, viscounts of Albi. Resulting from the charter, Castres was ruled by a college of consuls.

During the Albigensian Crusade, it surrendered of its own accord to Simon de Montfort, and thus entered into the kingdom of France in 1229. In 1317, Pope John XXII established the bishopric of Castres. In 1356, the town of Castres was raised to a countship by King John II of France. However, the town greatly suffered from the Black Plague in 1347-1348, then from the Black Prince of England and the Free Companies (bands of lawless mercenaries) who laid waste the country during the Hundred Years' War. Consequently, by the late 14th century Castres entered a period of sharp decline. In 1375, there were only 4,000 inhabitants left in town, only half the figure from a century before. Following the confiscation of the possessions of Jacques d'Armagnac, duke of Nemours, to which the countship of Castres had passed, it was bestowed in 1476 by King Louis XI on Boffille de Juge (Boffillo del Giudice), an Italian nobleman and adventurer serving as a diplomat for Louis XI, but the appointment led to so much disagreement (a family feud between Boffille de Juge, his only daughter, and his brother-in-law) that the countship was united to the crown by King Francis I in 1519.

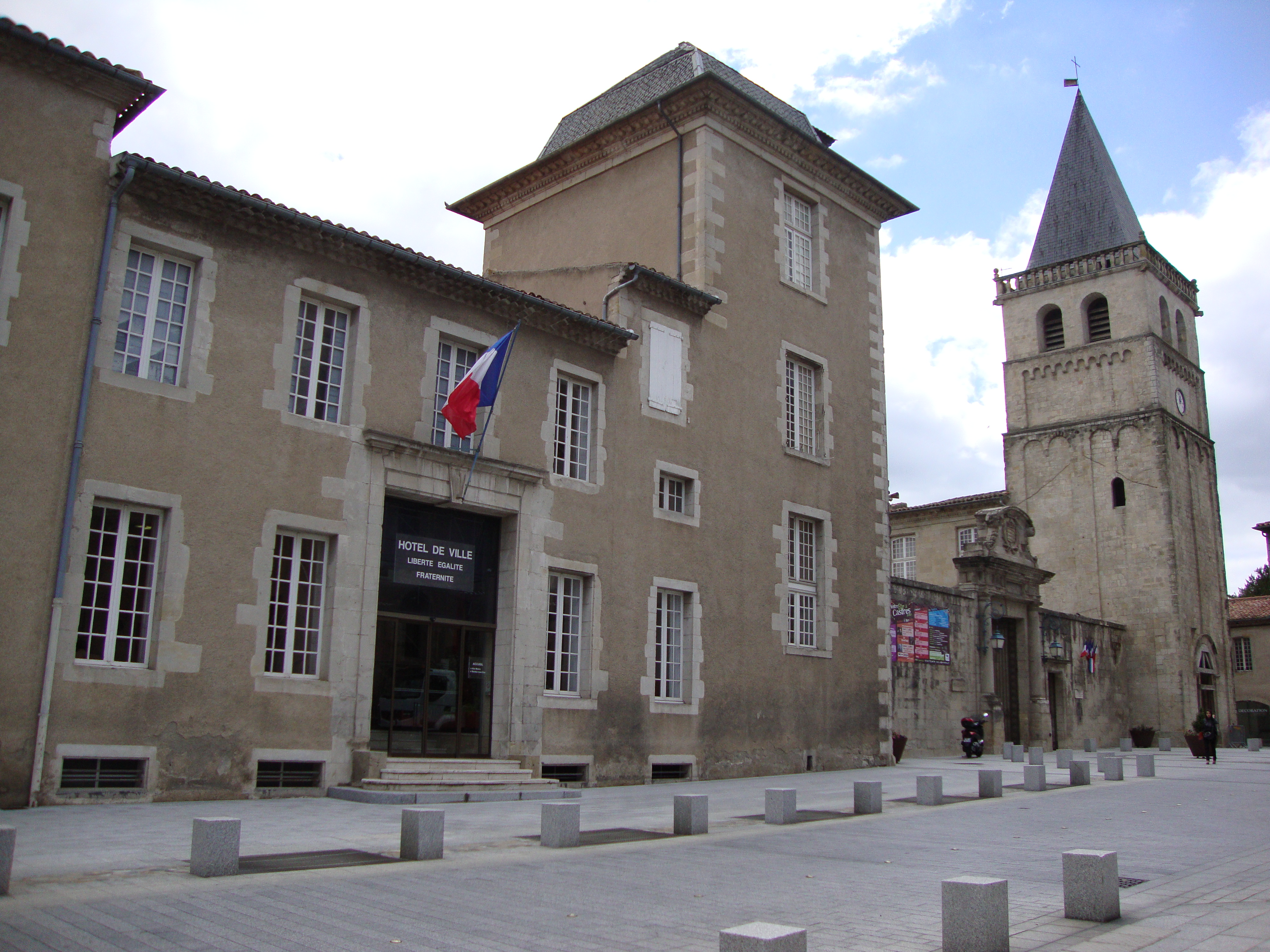
The Palace of the Bishops of Castres

Around 1560, the majority of the population of Castres converted to Protestantism. In the wars of the latter part of the 16th century the inhabitants sided with the Protestant party, fortified the town, and established an independent republic. Castres was one of the largest Protestant strongholds in southern France, along with Montauban and La Rochelle. Henry of Navarre, leader of the Protestant party, who later became King Henry IV of France, stayed in Castres in 1585. The Protestants of Castres were brought to terms, however, by King Louis XIII in 1629, and Richelieu came himself to Castres to have its fortifications dismantled. Nonetheless, after these religious wars, the town, now in peace, enjoyed a period of rapid expansion. Business and traditional commercial activities revived, in particular fur and leather-dressing, tanning, and above all wool trade. Culture flourished anew, with the founding of the Academy of Castres in 1648. Castres was turned by the Catholic Church into an active center of Counter-Reformation, with the establishments of several convents in town, and the building of the Palace of the Bishops of Castres by Monsignor Tubœuf, still the most famous monument in town today, completed in 1673.

A new cathedral was also built after the destructions of the religious wars. Perhaps even more importantly, Castres was made the seat of the Chambre de l'Édit of the Parliament of Toulouse, a court of justice detached from the Parliament of Toulouse and in charge of dealing with the cases involving the Protestants of Languedoc, a measure of protection granted to them by the Edict of Nantes. This court attracted much business to Castres. In 1665, there were 7,000 inhabitants in Castres, 4,000 of whom Catholic, and 3,000 Protestant.

In 1670, however, the Chambre de l'Édit was transferred to Castelnaudary, much to the discontent of even the catholic citizens of Castres, who lost a major source of business and revenue with the departure of the lawyers and the plaintiffs. The Revocation of the Edict of Nantes soon followed, and Castres suffered greatly when many Protestants chose to go into exile. Then came the plague of 1720-1721 and the fire of 1724. Last but not least, Castres lost its liberal charter in 1758. In the 1760s, a few years after the famous Calas Affair in Toulouse, Castres made the headlines nationwide: Pierre-Paul Sirven and his wife, both Protestants, were wrongly accused of having murdered their daughter in order to prevent her from converting to Catholicism. Tried and sentenced to death in absentia on March 29, 1764, they were defended by Voltaire, and eventually exonerated in 1771.

The outbreak of the French Revolution was generally welcomed in Castres, particularly among the local Protestant merchants and entrepreneurs, but the majority of the population remained moderate during the whole period. In 1793 for instance, Protestant pastor Alba La Source, Castres' representative at the Convention in Paris, opposed the deportation of "non-juror" Catholic priests to French Guiana, where death in the horrid jungle was certain (see Civil Constitution of the Clergy). "Non-juror" priests were by far the majority in the region of Castres. Accused of being a moderate, Alba La Source was guillotined in October 1793. Suspected of being lukewarm toward the revolution, Castres was duly chastised. The bishopric which had been established by Pope John XXII in 1317 was abolished, Castres later becoming part of the bishopric of Albi. Capital of the département of Tarn in 1790, the town was downgraded to capital of an arrondissement in 1797, Albi being made the capital of the département.

Despite those setbacks, in the 19th century the economy of Castres developed greatly, and the town grew outside of its old medieval center. As early as 1815, the first mechanized wool mill was set up in town. Originally specialized in luxury cloth, the Castres textile industry then turned toward more ordinary types of cloth, whose markets were considerably larger. Around 1860, there were 50 wool mills in town, employing 3,000 people. In the late 19th century, mechanical engineering industries appeared beside the textile industry, which led to Castres becoming a major arsenal for the French army during the First World War. Castres was linked to the French railway network in 1865. At the end of the 19th century, Castres was the largest town in the département of Tarn, with 5,000 more inhabitants than Albi.

However, in the 20th century, the town entered a new period of decline. Although Castres emerged from the two world wars unscathed since no military operations or battles took place in southwestern France, the local economy has been hard hit by change. Like so many towns and cities of Europe that had benefited most from the Industrial Revolution, Castres is experiencing a difficult restructuring of its industrial base. Textile has particularly suffered. Castres is also crippled by its geographical location, isolated in a dead end at the foot of the Massif Central mountains, away from the main exchange and transport routes. Castres is still not connected to the motorway (freeway) network of France, the only town of that size in France not yet connected. The creation of the Greater Castres-Mazamet Council in 2000 was expected to deal with the transport problem, and to work on attracting new industries. The good fortune of Castres is to be located only 79 kilometres (49 mi) away from the very dynamic Toulouse. The long-promised A69 motorway link with Toulouse was finally opened in the fall of 2026, and Castres hopes to benefit from its proximity with the big Occitan city.

== Social housing ==
In the Laden-Petit-Train district. Demolition of Albert Ier apartment building began on September 19, 2025. New housing, including single-family homes, and a new road will be built.

== Economy ==
The principal industries are mechanical and electrical engineering, machine tools, wooden furniture, granite, textile, fur and leather-dressing, tanning, chemicals, pharmaceuticals, and selective breeding of cows.

Traditional and polluting industries such as textile, tanning, fur and leather-dressing, or chemicals, are in sharp decline. However, a multinational pharmaceutical group (Pierre Fabre Group) emerged in the town in the 1960s, and it has kept its headquarters and R&D division in the metropolitan area, helping to counterbalance the general decline in industry. Some claim that its founder and former president, Pierre Fabre, was the real "master" of Castres, making and designating Castres' mayors at will.

=== Transport ===
The Gare de Castres railway station is served by regional trains to Mazamet and Toulouse.

== People ==
Castres is the hometown of socialist politician and newspaper publisher Jean Jaurès (1859–1914), who was murdered in Paris the day before the start of the First World War.

Mathematician Pierre de Fermat died in Castres in 1665, while attending a session of the Chambre de l'Édit there.

French writer Roger Peyrefitte was born into a wealthy family of Castres in 1907.

Former French footballer Claude Puel was also born in Castres.

Other people born in the city include:

- Guilhabert de Castres - Cathar bishop
- Nicolas Jean de Dieu Soult - Politician and marshal during the Napoleonic wars
- André Dacier - Scholar
- John Ligonier, 1st Earl Ligonier - British general
- Paul de Rapin - Historian
- Roger Peyrefitte - Diplomat and author
- Claude Puel - Football player and manager
- Charles Blanc - Art critic
- Yannick Jauzion - Rugby union player
- Clément Poitrenaud - Rugby union player
- Pierre Camara - Athlete
- Pierre-Paul Sirven - philosopher
- Maryline Salvetat - cyclist.
- Guillaume Borne - footballer
- Maurice Gabolde - Minister of Justice in the Vichy regime of Philippe Petain
- Lore Baudrit - ice hockey player

Residents of Castres include:

- Paul Pellisson - Author
- Anne Lefèvre - Scholar
- Jean Bon Saint-André - Politician during the Revolution era
- Bernardo Gui - Inquisitor
- Philip of Montfort, Lord of Castres - Nobleman
- Boffille de Juge - Statesman
- Vincent Baron - Theologian
- Pierre de Fermat - Mathematician
- Kees Meeuws - Rugby union player
- Christophe Farnaud - French ambassador to Greece
- Hans Bellmer - Artist

== Main sights ==
Castres is intersected from north to south by the river Agout. The river is fringed by old houses the upper stories of which project over its waters.

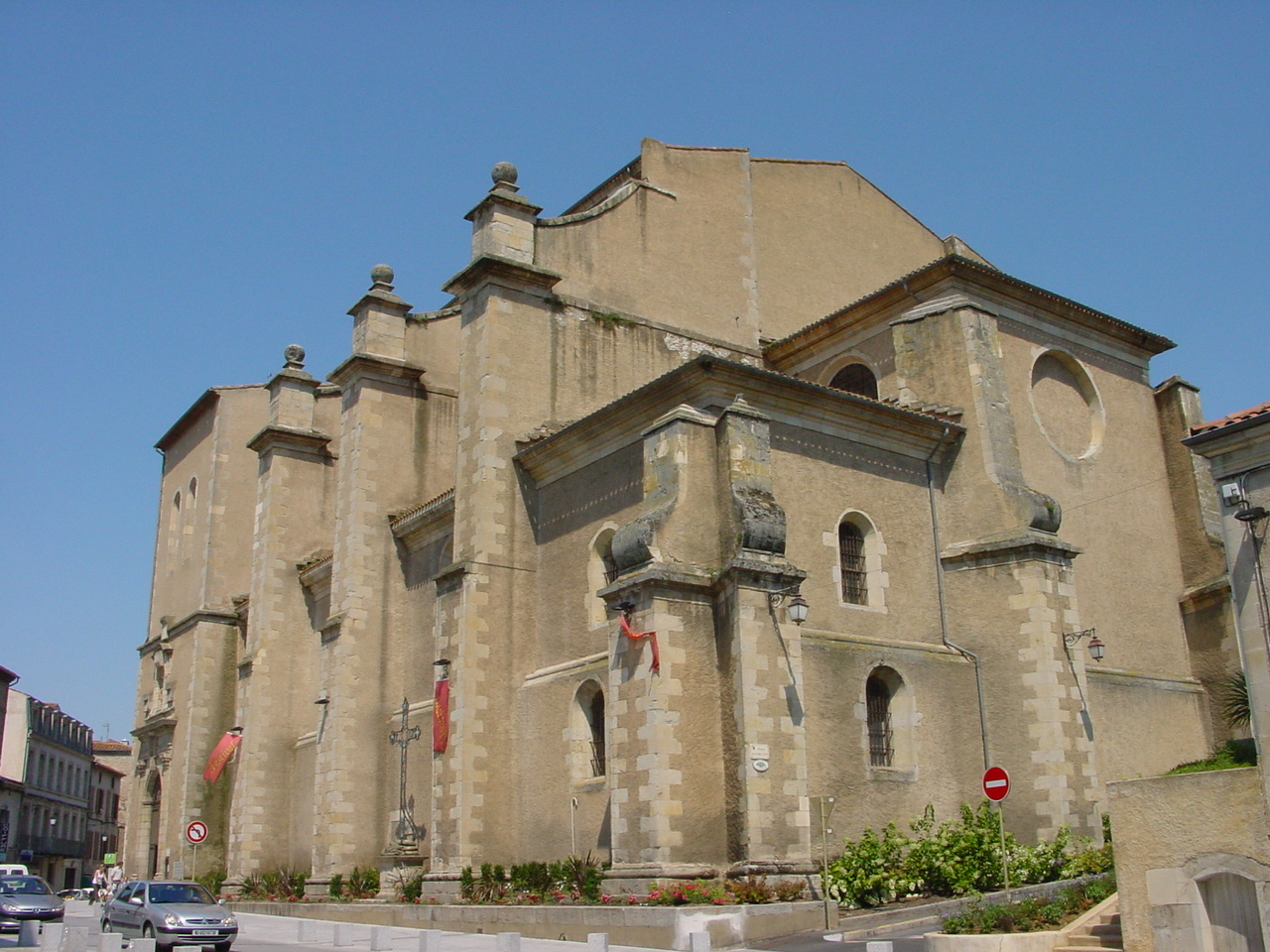
Cathedral of Saint Benoît in Castres

The church of Saint Benoît, once the cathedral of Castres, and the most important of the churches of Castres today, dates only from the 17th and 18th centuries. The city hall occupies the former bishop's palace, designed in the 17th century by Jules Hardouin-Mansart (the architect of Versailles), and with gardens designed by André Le Nôtre (the designer of the gardens in Versailles). The Romanesque tower beside it (Tour Saint Benoît) is the only survival of the old Benedictine abbey. The town possesses some old mansions from the 16th and 17th century, including the Hôtel de Nayrac, of the Renaissance.

Castres possesses the renowned Goya Museum, created in 1840, which contains the largest collection of Spanish paintings in France. A Jaurès Museum was also opened in 1954 in the house where Jean Jaurès was born in 1859.

The Jardin botanique Pierre Fabre "La Michonne" is a private botanical garden and conservatory that can be visited.

== Tourism labels ==
The commune has been awarded the "Commune à découvrir" tourism and heritage label. In 2024, it obtained 2.5 clocks.

== Sports ==
As one might expect of a town of western Occitania nicknamed Ovalie, the main sport in Castres is rugby union, followed religiously by many locals. The local professional club is Castres Olympique, who are five-time champions of France (in 1949, 1950, 1993, 2013 and 2018). Castres Olympique was the property of local tycoon Pierre Fabre, founder and president of Pierre Fabre Group.

The finish of Stage 12 of the 2007 Tour de France was in Castres.

== Education ==
- Jean-François Champollion University Center for Teaching and Research

== Cinema ==
Castres is the place where a short film festival occurs each year.

== Medias ==
The city happened to see the birth of its first student radio (RADIOM) in 2007.

== Twin towns ==
Castres is twinned with:

- Linares, Spain
- (United Kingdom) Wakefield, England
- Butare, Rwanda

== Climate ==
Climate data for Castres (1992–2010 normals, extremes 1992–2012)
Month	Jan	Feb	Mar	Apr	May	Jun	Jul	Aug	Sep	Oct	Nov	Dec	Year
Record high °C (°F)	19.3 (66.7)	24.6 (76.3)	28.5 (83.3)	31.7 (89.1)	34.0 (93.2)	39.3 (102.7)	40.8 (105.4)	43.0 (109.4)	38.1 (100.6)	30.8 (87.4)	24.4 (75.9)	21.5 (70.7)	43.0 (109.4)
Mean daily maximum °C (°F)	10.2 (50.4)	11.8 (53.2)	15.7 (60.3)	18.4 (65.1)	22.7 (72.9)	26.7 (80.1)	29.4 (84.9)	29.7 (85.5)	25.2 (77.4)	20.1 (68.2)	13.5 (56.3)	10.1 (50.2)	19.5 (67.1)
Daily mean °C (°F)	6.6 (43.9)	7.5 (45.5)	10.3 (50.5)	12.9 (55.2)	17.2 (63.0)	20.7 (69.3)	23.0 (73.4)	23.2 (73.8)	19.2 (66.6)	15.5 (59.9)	9.7 (49.5)	6.7 (44.1)	14.4 (57.9)
Mean daily minimum °C (°F)	3.0 (37.4)	3.1 (37.6)	4.9 (40.8)	7.4 (45.3)	11.7 (53.1)	14.8 (58.6)	16.6 (61.9)	16.7 (62.1)	13.1 (55.6)	10.9 (51.6)	5.9 (42.6)	3.4 (38.1)	9.3 (48.7)
Record low °C (°F)	−7.9 (17.8)	−12.0 (10.4)	−9.0 (15.8)	−1.5 (29.3)	2.5 (36.5)	4.5 (40.1)	8.4 (47.1)	6.6 (43.9)	4.0 (39.2)	−2.0 (28.4)	−7.4 (18.7)	−9.5 (14.9)	−12.0 (10.4)
Average precipitation mm (inches)	70.2 (2.76)	53.6 (2.11)	59.7 (2.35)	90.4 (3.56)	86.8 (3.42)	79.1 (3.11)	40.9 (1.61)	64.2 (2.53)	71.6 (2.82)	75.1 (2.96)	81.1 (3.19)	76.4 (3.01)	849.1 (33.43)
Average precipitation days (≥ 1.0 mm)	10.8	9.1	8.3	10.8	9.3	7.6	5.9	7.0	7.1	9.5	11.1	10.4	106.7
Source: Meteociel

== See also ==
- Castres-Mazamet Airport
- Communes of the Tarn department
- Tourism in Tarn
