= Martres =

- Commune
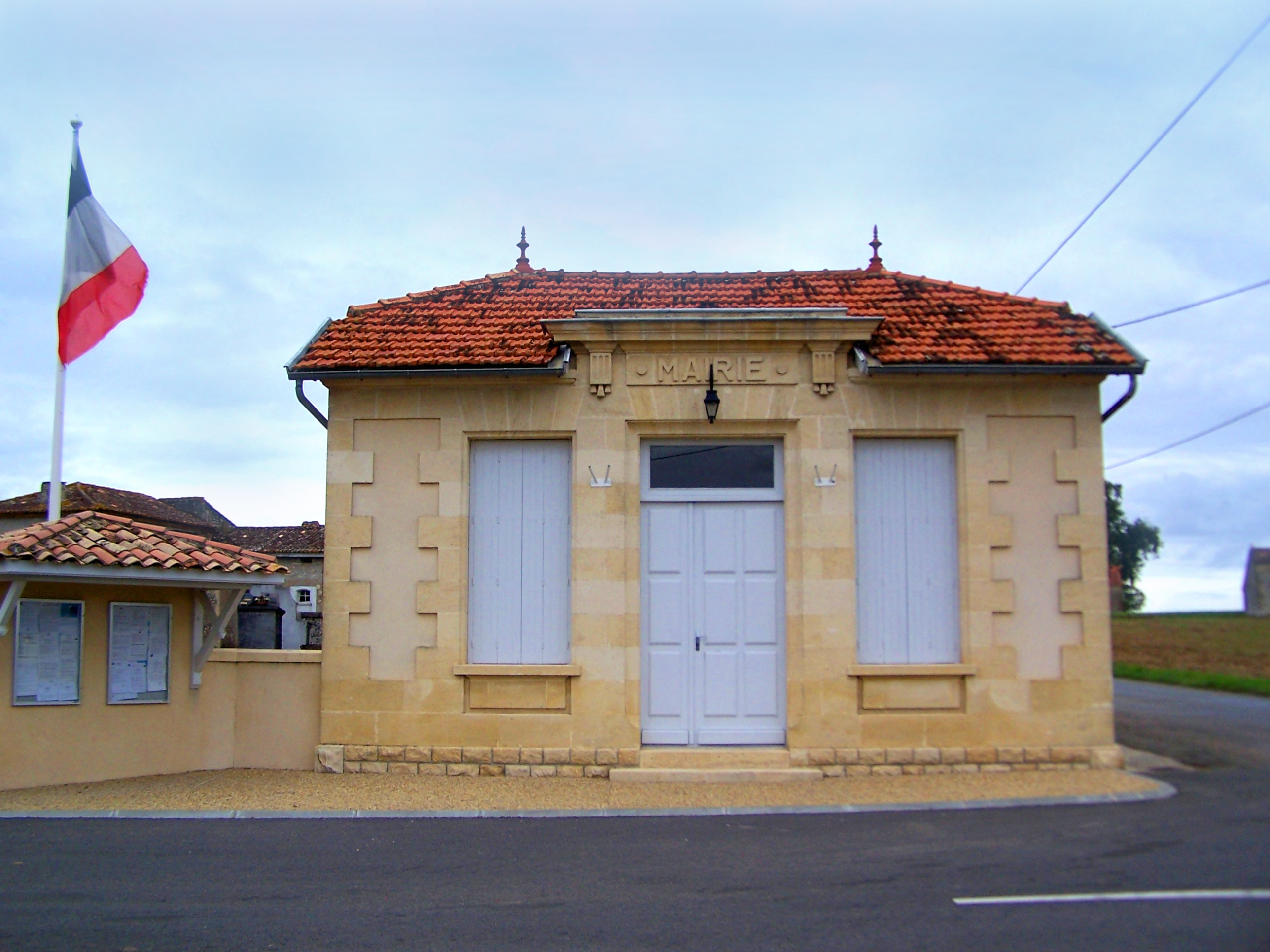
- Town hall
- Location of Martres
- Location within France Location within Nouvelle-Aquitaine
- Coordinates: 44°42′39″N 0°10′02″W
- Country: France
- Region: Nouvelle-Aquitaine
- Department: Gironde
- Arrondissement: Langon
- Canton: L'Entre-Deux-Mers
- Intercommunality: CC rurales de l'Entre-Deux-Mers

Government
  - Mayor (2020–2026): Régis Pujol
- Area^{1}: 3.03 km^{2} (1.17 sq mi)
- Elevation: 59 m (194 ft)
- Highest elevation: 79 m (259 ft)
- Lowest elevation: 38 m (125 ft)
- Population (2023): 105
  - Density: 34.7/km^{2} (89.8/sq mi)
- Time zone: UTC+01:00 (CET)
  - Summer (DST): UTC+02:00 (CEST)
- INSEE/Postal code: 33275 /33760
- ^{1} French Land Register data, which excludes lakes, ponds, glaciers > 1 km^{2} (0.386 sq mi or 247 acres) and river estuaries.

Martres (French pronunciation: [maʁtʁ]) is a commune in the Gironde department in Nouvelle-Aquitaine in southwestern France.

== Population ==
Historical population
Year	Pop.	±% p.a.
1968	114	—
1975	94	−2.72%
1982	84	−1.59%
1990	92	+1.14%
1999	105	+1.48%
2007	126	+2.31%
2012	126	+0.00%
2017	113	−2.15%
2023	105	−1.22%
Source: INSEE

== See also ==
- Communes of the Gironde department
