= Château de Faye =

List of castles in France

Château de Faye is the name of several castles in France, including:

- Château de la Faye (Auriac-du-Périgord), Dordogne.
- Château de la Faye (Deviat)
- Château de Faye (Flavignac)
- Château de la Faye (Léguillac).
- Château de la Faye (Olmet) in Puy-de-Dôme.
- Château de la Faye (Saint-Dizier-la-Tour)
- Château la Faye, Saint-Sulpice-de-Mareuil.
- Château de la Faye (Villexavier)
- Manoir de La Faye (Manzac-sur-Vern) in the Dordogne.
- Manoir de La Faye, Sainte-Orse, Dordogne.
- Château de Fayolle (Tocane-Saint-Apre)
- Château de Fayolles (Saussignac)
