= Château de la Faye =

Château de la Faye may refer to:

- Château de la Faye (Auriac-du-Périgord)
- Château de la Faye (Deviat)
- Château de la Faye (Olmet)
- Château de la Faye (Saint-Sulpice-de-Mareuil)
- Château de la Faye (Villexavier)
