= Fayolle =

Fayolle may refer to:

- Bertrand Fayolle (born 1975), French former footballer and manager
- Émile Fayolle (1852–1928), a Marshal of France
- Guy de Fayolle (1882–1944), a French philatelist
- Jean Fayolle (1937–2025), a French former long-distance runner
- Fayolle, François-Joseph-Marie (1774-1852), French critic of music

== See also ==
- Château de Fayolle (Tocane-Saint-Apre), a castle in Dordogne, Aquitane, France
