= Georges de Peyrebrune =

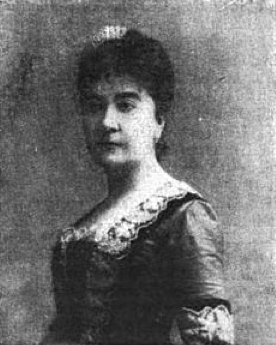
- Born: 18 April 1841; Sainte-Orse, France
- Died: 16 November 1917 (aged 76); Paris, France
- Occupation: Writer
- Writing career
- Language: French
- Period: Belle Époque

Signature
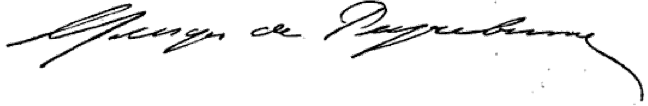

Mathilde-Marie Georgina Élisabeth de Peyrebrune (also known as George de Peyrebrune or Georges de Peyrebrune, and Judicis de la Mirandole; pseudonyms Hunedelle, Marco, and Petit Bob; 18 April 1841 – 1917) was a key French proto-feminist Belle Époque writer of popular novels. She was "one of the most widely read women in France", and one of the country's most popular women novelists.

== Biography ==
Born in Pierrebrune, a hamlet of Sainte-Orse, Dordogne in 1841, she transformed "Pierrebrune" to "Peyrebrune", making it her family name. She was the daughter of Françoise Thérèse Céline Judicis and Georges Johnston, a wealthy local land-owner.

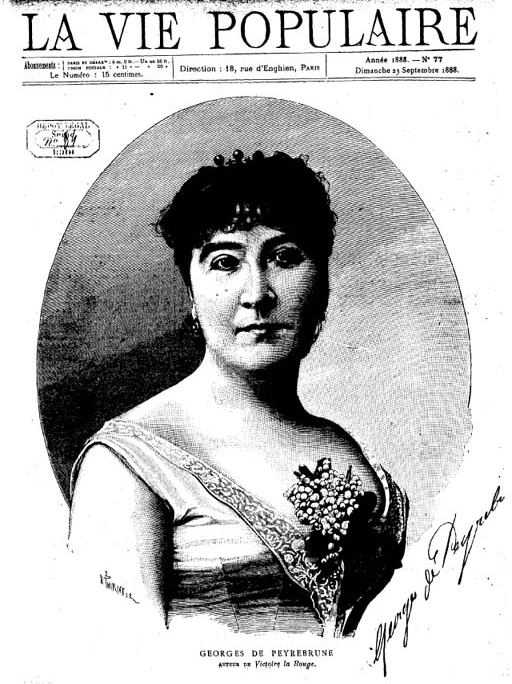
Georges de Peyrebrune

She went to Paris after the war of 1870, and she made her literary debut in the magazine Revue des deux Mondes, where many of her novels were serialised. In Paris, she met Arsène Houssaye, who, after having read her Marco manuscript interceded on her behalf with the magazine editor François Buloz. Peyrebrune wrote for several women's magazines and she also published a number of novels. Intellectually she had interests in both scientific, philosophical and masonic ideas. She opposed capital punishment and her feminism was characterized as "undeniable and contradictory". Peyrebrune published fourteen works in the 1880s with the firms Calmann-Lévy, Charpentier, Dentu, Ollendorff, and Plon. For many years, she served as on the all female jury for the Prix Fémina literary prize. In 1909, she was one of the 40 members elected by the readers of Fémina to represent "A Female Academy".

Peyrebrune's nom de plume started with "Georges", after George Sand because Peyrebrune held her work in high regard. The writers Camille Delaville and Rachilde were her friends. Peyrebrune married Paul Adrien Numa Eimery, from Chancelade, signing the marriage license "G. Johnston de Peyrebrune"; it was an unhappy marriage and there were no children. She died in poverty and oblivion in Paris in 1917.

== Selected works ==
- Contes en l'air. L'Apollon pythien. Une fenêtre sur l'autre monde. Tante Berthe. Une horrible histoire. Histoire d'un pantalon gris perle. Sous les branches (1877)
- Les Femmes qui tombent (1882)
- Gatienne (1882)
- Marco (1882)
- Jean Bernard (1883)
- Victoire la Rouge (1883)
- Une séparation (1884)
- Les Frères Colombe (1880)
- Mademoiselle de Tremos (1885)
- Les Roses d'Arlette (1886)
- Les Ensevelis (1887)
- La Margotti (1887)
- Colombine, conte-fantaisie (1898)
- Laquelle ? (1888)
- Le Curé d'Anchelles (1891)
- Giselle (1891)
- Le Roman d'un bas bleu (1892)
- Celui qui revient (1894)
- Vers l'amour (1896)
- Les Fiancés (1897)
- Libres (1897)
- Victoire la Rouge. Nouvelle édition. (1898)
- Au pied du mât (1899)
- Les Passionnés (1900)
- Une expérience (1901)
- Et l'amour vint (1902)
- Deux Amoureuses (1902)
- Une sentimentale (1903)
- Les Trois Demoiselles (1905)
- Doña Quichotta (1906)
- Le Réveil d'Ève (1909)
- Les Belles Martyres (1921)
