= Château de la Jarthe (Coursac) =

Château in Nouvelle-Aquitaine, France

Coordinates: 45°07′42″N 0°37′34″E

The Château de la Jarthe is a château during the 12th century in Coursac, Dordogne, Nouvelle-Aquitaine, France.
