= List of twin towns and sister cities in Scotland =

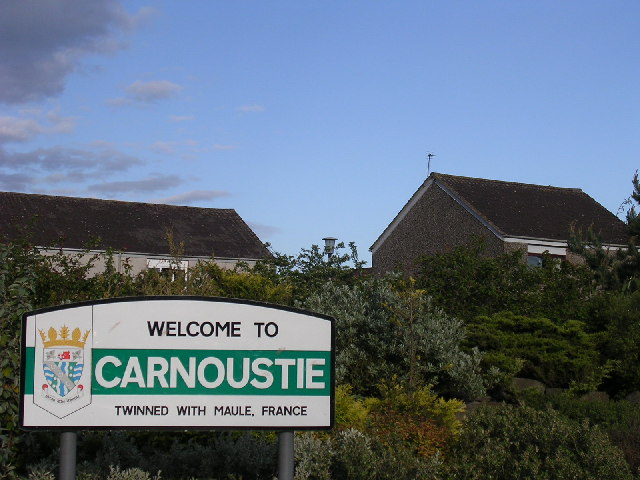
Sign in Carnoustie with its twin town

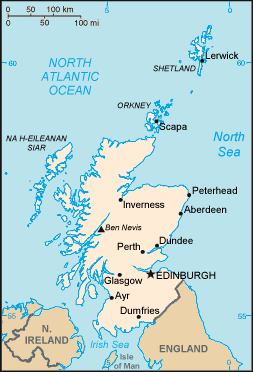
Map of Scotland

This is a list of places in Scotland which have standing links to local communities in other countries. In most cases, the association, especially when formalised by local government, is known as "town twinning" (usually in Europe) or "sister cities" (usually in the rest of the world).

== A ==
Aberdeen

- Bulawayo, Zimbabwe
- Clermont-Ferrand, France
- Regensburg, Germany
- Stavanger, Norway

Aberdour

- Corte Franca, Italy

Abernethy

- Grisy-Suisnes, France

Aboyne

- Martignas-sur-Jalle, France

Airdrie

- Stanley, Falkland Islands

Angus

- Sigulda, Latvia
- Yantai, China

Annan

- Watermael-Boitsfort, Belgium

Anstruther

- Bapaume, France

Argyll and Bute

- Amberg-Sulzbach (district), Germany

Ayr

- Saint-Germain-en-Laye, France

== B ==
Birnam

- Asheville, United States

Blairgowrie and Rattray

- Fergus (Centre Wellington), Canada
- Pleasanton, United States

Bonnyrigg

- Saint-Cyr-l'École, France

Bothwell

- Jouy-en-Josas, France

Burntisland

- Flekkefjord, Norway

== C ==
Carnoustie

- Maule, France

Clackmannanshire

- Espartinas, Spain
- Vendargues, France

Coatbridge

- Saint-Denis, France

Coldstream

- Bennecourt, France

Comrie

- Carleton Place, Canada

Crieff

- Wellington, United States

Cumbernauld

- Bron, France

== D ==
Dalgety Bay and Hillend

- Ócsa, Hungary

Dalkeith

- Jarnac, France

Danderhall

- Angres, France

Dull

- Bland, Australia
- Boring, United States

Dumfries

- Annapolis, United States
- Cantù, Italy
- Gifhorn, Germany

Dunbar

- Lignières, France
- Martinez, United States

Dundee

- Alexandria, United States
- Nablus, Palestine
- Orléans, France
- Würzburg, Germany
- Zadar, Croatia

Dunfermline

- Albufeira, Portugal
- Logroño, Spain
- Sarasota, United States
- Trondheim, Norway
- Vichy, France
- Wilhelmshaven, Germany

Dunkeld

- Asheville, United States

Duns

- Żagań, Poland

== E ==
Earlston

- Cappella Maggiore, Italy

East Ayrshire

- Joué-lès-Tours, France

East Dunbartonshire

- Corbeil-Essonnes, France
- Yoichi, Japan

East Kilbride

- Ballerup, Denmark

East Lothian

- Barga, Italy
- Spree-Neiße (district), Germany

East Renfrewshire

- Albertslund, Denmark

Edinburgh

- Aalborg, Denmark
- Dunedin, New Zealand
- Florence, Italy
- Kraków, Poland
- Kyiv, Ukraine
- Munich, Germany
- Nice, France
- San Diego, United States
- Shenzhen, China
- Vancouver, Canada
- Xi'an, China

Edzell

- Sauze d'Oulx, Italy

Elgin

- Landshut, Germany

Ellon

- Chièvres, Belgium

Embo

- Maui County, United States

Errol

- Mardié, France

Eyemouth

- Marle, France

== F ==
Falkirk

- Chełmno, Poland
- Créteil, France
- Odenwald (district), Germany
- San Rafael, United States

Fochabers

- Magnac-sur-Touvre, France

Fife

- Gansu, China

Forfar

- Chabanais, France

Forres

- Goslar, Germany
- Mount Dora, United States

Fort William

- Dudley, England, United Kingdom

Fraserburgh

- Bressuire, France

== G ==
Girvan

- Torcy, France

Glasgow

- Bethlehem, Palestine
- Dalian, China
- Havana, Cuba
- Lahore, Pakistan
- Marseille, France
- Mykolaiv, Ukraine
- Nuremberg, Germany
- Turin, Italy

Glenrothes

- Böblingen, Germany

Grangemouth

- La Porte, United States

== H ==
Haddington

- Aubigny-sur-Nère, France

Hamilton

- Châtellerault, France

Hawick

- Bailleul, France

Helensburgh

- Thouars, France

== I ==
Innerleithen

- Le Nouvion-en-Thiérache, France

Inverness

- Augsburg, Germany
- La Baule-Escoublac, France
- Saint-Valery-en-Caux, France

Inverurie

- Bagneres-de-Bigorre, France

Irvine

- Voisins-le-Bretonneux, France

== J ==
Jedburgh

- Malestroit, France

== K ==
Kelso

- Kelso, United States
- Orchies, France

Kilmacolm

- Mérignies, France

Kilmarnock

- Alès, France
- Herstal, Belgium
- Kulmbach, Germany

Kilsyth

- Meulan-en-Yvelines, France

Kinross

- Gacé, France

Kirkcaldy

- Ingolstadt, Germany

Kirkwall

- Moena, Italy

Kirriemuir

- Volvic, France

== L ==
Lanark

- Yvetot, France

Largs

- Andernos-les-Bains, France

Larkhall

- Seclin, France

Lasswade

- Saint-Cyr-l'École, France

Lerwick

- Måløy (Kinn Municipality), Norway

Letham

- Léguillac-de-l'Auche, France
- (Republic of Ireland) Monasterboice, Ireland

Leven

- Bruges, France
- Holzminden, Germany

Linlithgow

- Guyancourt, France

Lossiemouth

- Hersbruck, Germany

Lower Largo

- Robinson Crusoe Island (Juan Fernández Islands), Chile

Lybster

- Mackinac Island, United States

== M ==
Maybole

- Belœil, Belgium
- Crosne, France
- Schotten, Germany

Midlothian

- Heinsberg (district), Germany
- Komárom-Esztergom, Hungary

Moffat

- Montreuil-sur-Ille, France

Monifieth

- Soyaux, France

Montrose

- Luzarches, France

Moray

- Kronach (district), Germany

Musselburgh

- Champigny-sur-Marne, France
- Rosignano Marittimo, Italy

== N ==
Newport-on-Tay

- Zolotarovo, Ukraine

North Ayrshire

- Uddevalla, Sweden

North Berwick

- Kerteminde, Denmark

North Lanarkshire

- Airdrie, Canada
- Campi Bisenzio, Italy
- Schweinfurt, Germany

== O ==
Oban

- (Republic of Ireland) Gorey, Ireland
- Laurinburg, United States

Orkney

- Hordaland, Norway

== P ==
Paisley

- Fürth, Germany
- Gladsaxe, Denmark

Peebles

- Hendaye, France

Penicuik

- L'Isle-sur-la-Sorgue, France

Perth

- Aschaffenburg, Germany
- Bydgoszcz, Poland
- Cognac, France
- Haikou, China
- Nikopol, Ukraine
- Perth, Australia
- Perth, Canada

Peterhead

- Ålesund, Norway

Pitlochry

- Confolens, France

Prestwick

- Ariccia, Italy
- Lichtenfels, Germany
- Vandalia, United States

== R ==
Renfrew

- Renfrew County, Canada

== S ==
Selkirk

- Plattling, Germany

South Ayrshire

- Newnan, United States

South Lanarkshire

- Hemmingen, Germany

St Andrews

- Loches, France

Stepps

- Les Marches, France

Stirling

- Dunedin, United States
- Keçiören, Turkey
- Óbuda-Békásmegyer (Budapest), Hungary
- Summerside, Canada
- Villeneuve-d'Ascq, France

Stonehaven

- Achères, France
- Athens, United States

Stornoway

- Pendleton, United States

== T ==
Thurso

- Brilon, Germany

Troon

- Villeneuve-sur-Lot, France

== W ==
West Dunbartonshire

- Argenteuil, France

West Lothian

- Grapevine, United States
- Hochsauerland (district), Germany

Wick

- Klaksvík, Faroe Islands
