= La Chapelle-Gonaguet =

- Commune
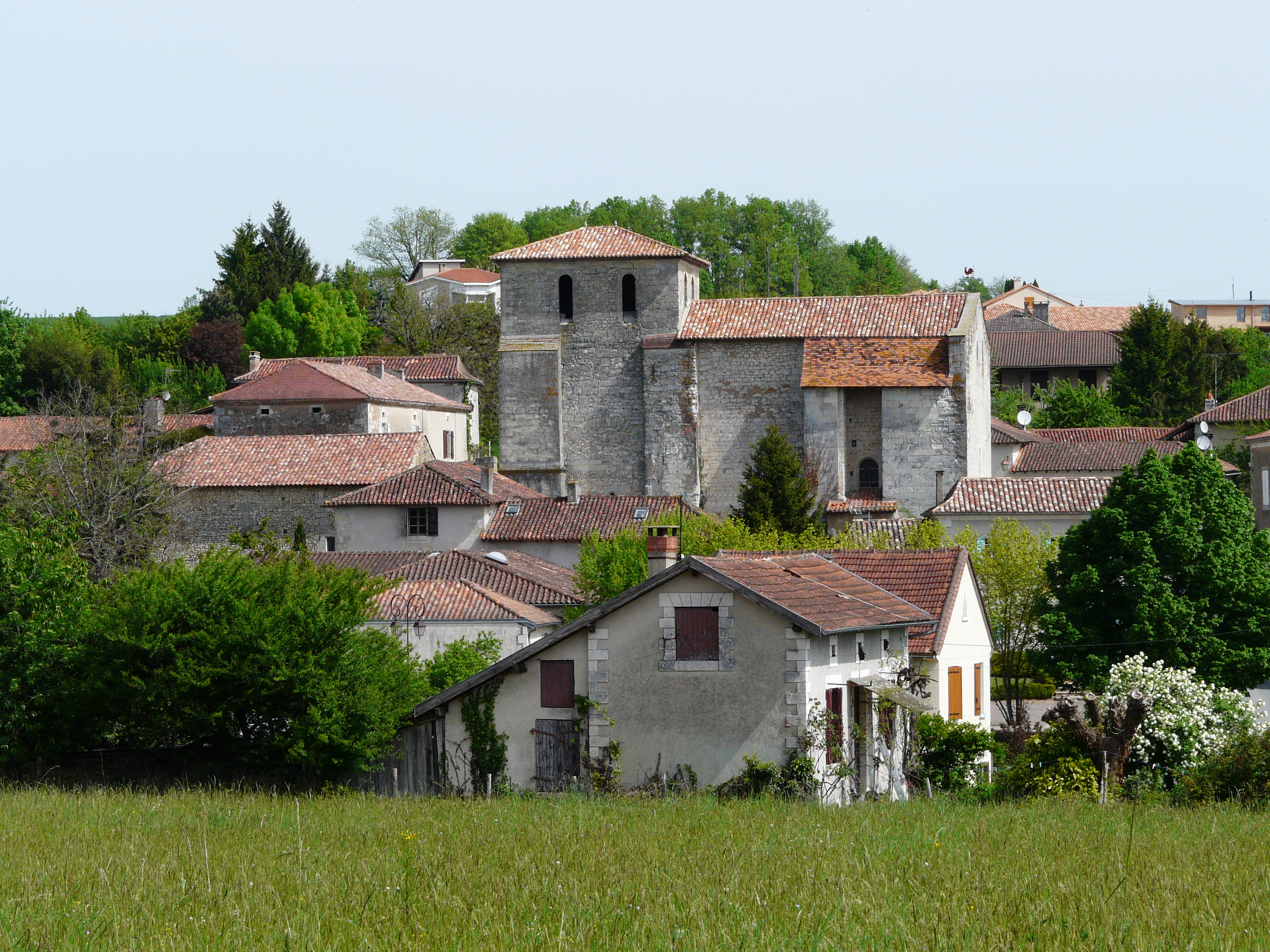
- The church and surroundings in La Chapelle-Gonaguet
- Location of La Chapelle-Gonaguet
- Location within France Location within Nouvelle-Aquitaine
- Coordinates: 45°13′53″N 0°36′50″E
- Country: France
- Region: Nouvelle-Aquitaine
- Department: Dordogne
- Arrondissement: Périgueux
- Canton: Saint-Astier
- Intercommunality: Le Grand Périgueux

Government
  - Mayor (2020–2026): Franck Moissat
- Area^{1}: 19.07 km^{2} (7.36 sq mi)
- Elevation: 179 m (587 ft)
- Highest elevation: 233 m (764 ft)
- Lowest elevation: 95 m (312 ft)
- Population (2023): 1,049
  - Density: 55.01/km^{2} (142.5/sq mi)
- Time zone: UTC+01:00 (CET)
  - Summer (DST): UTC+02:00 (CEST)
- INSEE/Postal code: 24108 /24350
- ^{1} French Land Register data, which excludes lakes, ponds, glaciers > 1 km^{2} (0.386 sq mi or 247 acres) and river estuaries.

La Chapelle-Gonaguet (French pronunciation: [la ʃapɛl ɡɔnaɡɛ]; Occitan: La Chapela de Gonaguet) is a commune in the Dordogne department in Nouvelle-Aquitaine in southwestern France.

== Population ==
Historical population
Year	Pop.	±% p.a.
1968	307	—
1975	331	+1.08%
1982	421	+3.50%
1990	703	+6.62%
1999	863	+2.30%
2007	1,024	+2.16%
2012	1,077	+1.01%
2017	1,069	−0.15%
2023	1,049	−0.31%
Source: INSEE

== See also ==
- Communes of the Dordogne department
