= Claude-Anne de Rouvroy de Saint Simon =

French politician and officer (1743–1819)

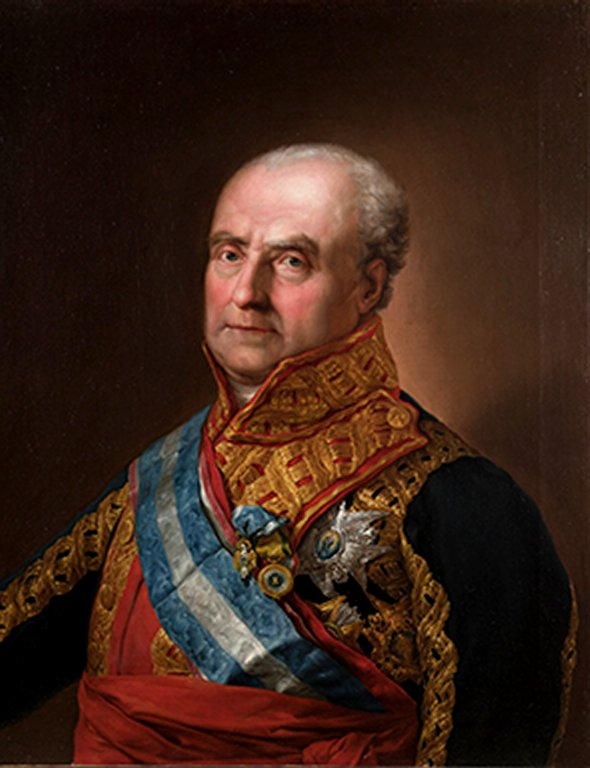
Claude-Anne de Rouvroy, marquis de Saint-Simon-Montbléru by Vicente López Portaña, ca. 1815-1818, oil on canvas, American Revolution Institute in Washington, D.C.

Claude-Anne de Rouvroy de Saint Simon (French pronunciation: [klod an də ʁuvʁwa də sɛ̃ simɔ̃]; Château de la Faye, Deviat, 16 March 1743 – Madrid, 3 January 1819), Marquis of Saint-Simon and Montblerú, Grandee of Spain, since 1814 Duke of Saint-Simon (Spanish title), was a Spanish-French army officer who served as Captain General of the Army.

== Biography ==
He was the son of Louis Gabriel de Rouvroy de Saint Simon, Marquis de Montbléru (1717-1777) and Catherine Pineau de Viennay.
He studied at the Strasbourg Military School. Having received the brevet of colonel, he commanded the Poitou regiment in 1771. In 1775, he commanded the Turenne regiment.

Promoted to Maréchal de camp in 1780, he embarked for America in September 1781, in the squadron of the Count de Grasse, to help the "Insurgents" against the British, as commander of an expeditionary force of some 3,500 men. He distinguished himself in the campaign, particularly at the Siege of Yorktown, where he commanded the left wing and barred the roads toward Williamsburg, thus preventing the British under Lord Cornwallis from escaping the encirclement by land.

Wounded in the battle, he became an original member of the Society of Cincinnati of France.
Upon his return to France, he was appointed in May 1783 governor of Saint-Jean-Pied-de-Port.

Elected on 30 March 1789 by the Bailiwick of Angoulême as deputy for the nobility to the Estates General, he protested against the reforms and the abolition of noble titles, and as an ultra-conservative tried to stop the course of events. Finally, by the end of 1790, he was forced to flee to Spain and his properties, Château Giscours in the Médoc and the Château de la Faye in Deviat, were seized by the State as national property.

=== In Spain ===
On 16 May 1793, King Charles IV of Spain appointed him Maréchal de camp in his army. He charged him with gathering French emigrants in Pamplona who wanted to fight. He formed the Légion des Pyrénées and took command of it. This legion of the Pyrenees (or Legion of Saint-Simon) was made up of French nobles, gentlemen and officers, but also of prisoners of war, deserters, emigrant Basques and some Spanish non-commissioned officers. With his legion, he participated in several battles in the War of the Pyrenees (1793-1795) against the French Revolutionaries. His son was killed, he himself was wounded twice and his legion suffered serious losses, especially in the Battle of the Baztan Valley.

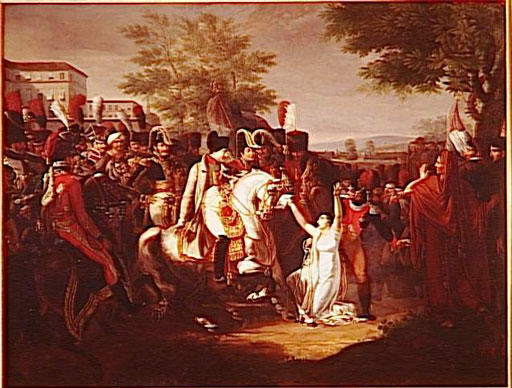
Mademoiselle de Saint-Simon begging Napoleon for her father's life (December 1808)

After the Peace of Basel, Spain and France became allies and Rouvroy participated in 1801 in the War of the Oranges against Portugal. When Napoleon invaded Spain in 1808 and started the Peninsular War, the authorities in Madrid called upon Rouvroy to defend the city. He fought the French at Fuencarral, but was defeated and taken prisoner on 3 December 1808. He was condemned to death by a court martial, but his daughter Balbine wrested his pardon from the emperor. The sentence was commuted and Saint-Simon was imprisoned in the Citadel of Besançon, where his daughter joined him as a willing companion in his captivity. He was freed by Cossacks in 1814 and his sentence was annulled by letters patent from the new king Louis XVIII, who further declared that he had served the House of Bourbon well through his loyalty.

He returned to Spain during the restoration of Ferdinand VII of Spain who elevated him to Duke of Saint-Simon and Captain general of the Army (the equivalent of Marshal of France) in October 1814. He then appointed him Colonel of the Walloon Guards. Saint Simon remained out of the political fray until he died in 1819.

=== Marriage and Children ===
He married on 1 April 1773 with Françoise-Louise Thomas de Pange, daughter of a Lorraine councilor in Parliament, with King Louis XV a witness. She died after four years of marriage, having given her husband two children:

- Hippolyte (1774-1794), killed in battle, no issue,
- Balbine (1777-1857), never married.

As his only son had died, his Spanish title of Duke de Saint-Simon went to his French nephew Henri Jean de Rouvroy, Marquis of Saint-Simon, who could however not carry this title, because it was not recognized in France.

== Sources ==
- Persée : Claude-Anne, «duque » (?) de Saint-Simon, by Georges Poisson. Cahiers Saint-Simon (2003, 31) pp. 105-111
