= Grignols, Dordogne =

Grignols
- Commune
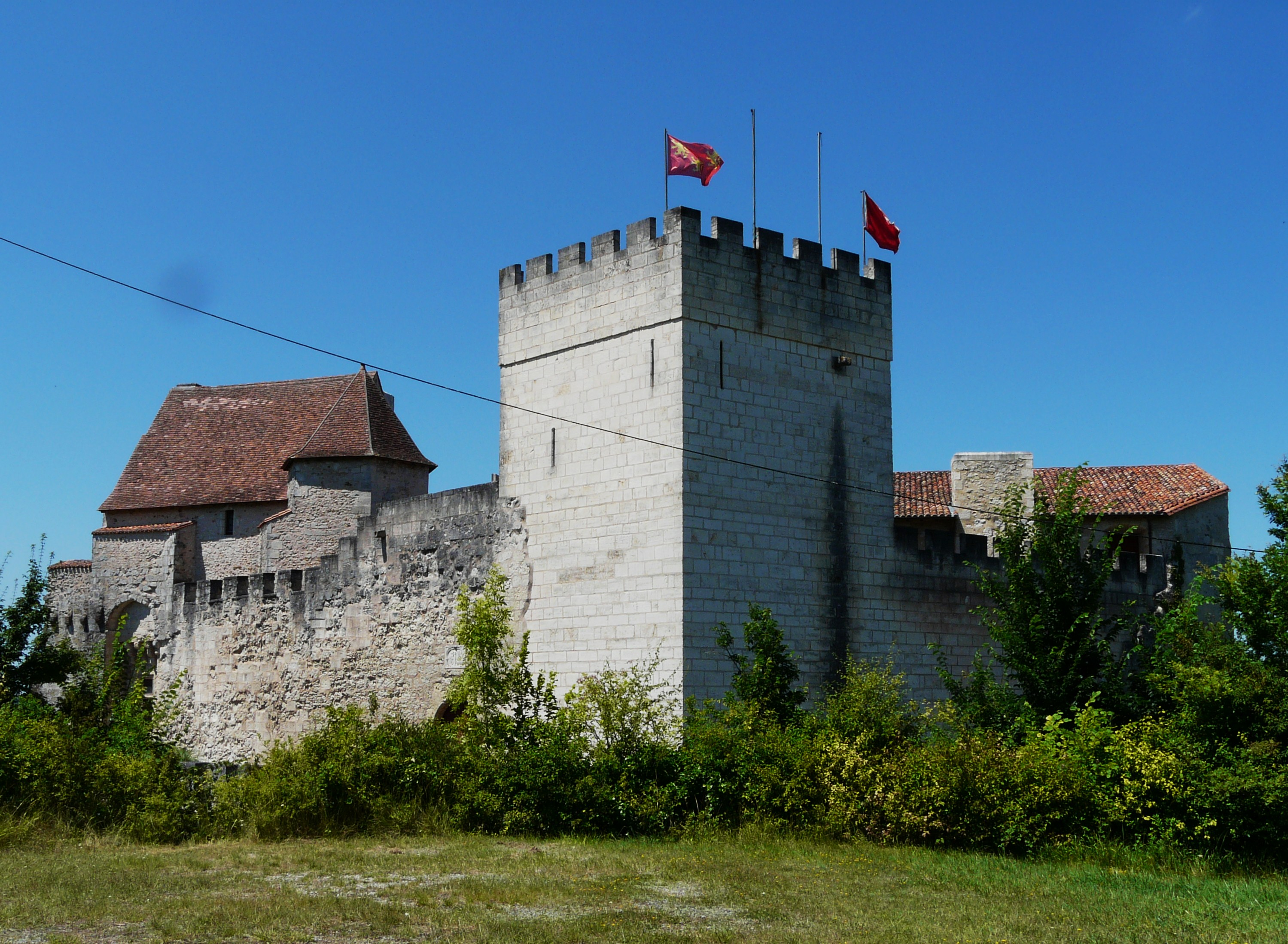
- Chateau

- Coat of arms
- Location of Grignols
- Location within France Location within Nouvelle-Aquitaine
- Coordinates: 45°05′00″N 0°32′29″E
- Country: France
- Region: Nouvelle-Aquitaine
- Department: Dordogne
- Arrondissement: Périgueux
- Canton: Saint-Astier

Government
  - Mayor (2020–2026): Patrick Gueysset
- Area^{1}: 20.41 km^{2} (7.88 sq mi)
- Elevation: 80 m (260 ft)
- Highest elevation: 207 m (679 ft)
- Lowest elevation: 68 m (223 ft)
- Population (2023): 667
  - Density: 32.7/km^{2} (84.6/sq mi)
- Time zone: UTC+01:00 (CET)
  - Summer (DST): UTC+02:00 (CEST)
- INSEE/Postal code: 24205 /24110
- ^{1} French Land Register data, which excludes lakes, ponds, glaciers > 1 km^{2} (0.386 sq mi or 247 acres) and river estuaries.

Grignols (French pronunciation: [ɡʁiɲɔl]; Occitan: Granhòu) is a commune in the Dordogne department in Nouvelle-Aquitaine in southwestern France.

== Population ==
Historical population
Year	Pop.	±% p.a.
1968	485	—
1975	487	+0.06%
1982	456	−0.94%
1990	526	+1.80%
1999	543	+0.35%
2007	652	+2.31%
2012	556	−3.14%
2017	672	+3.86%
2023	667	−0.12%
Source: INSEE

== See also ==
- Communes of the Dordogne department
