= Mensignac =

- Commune
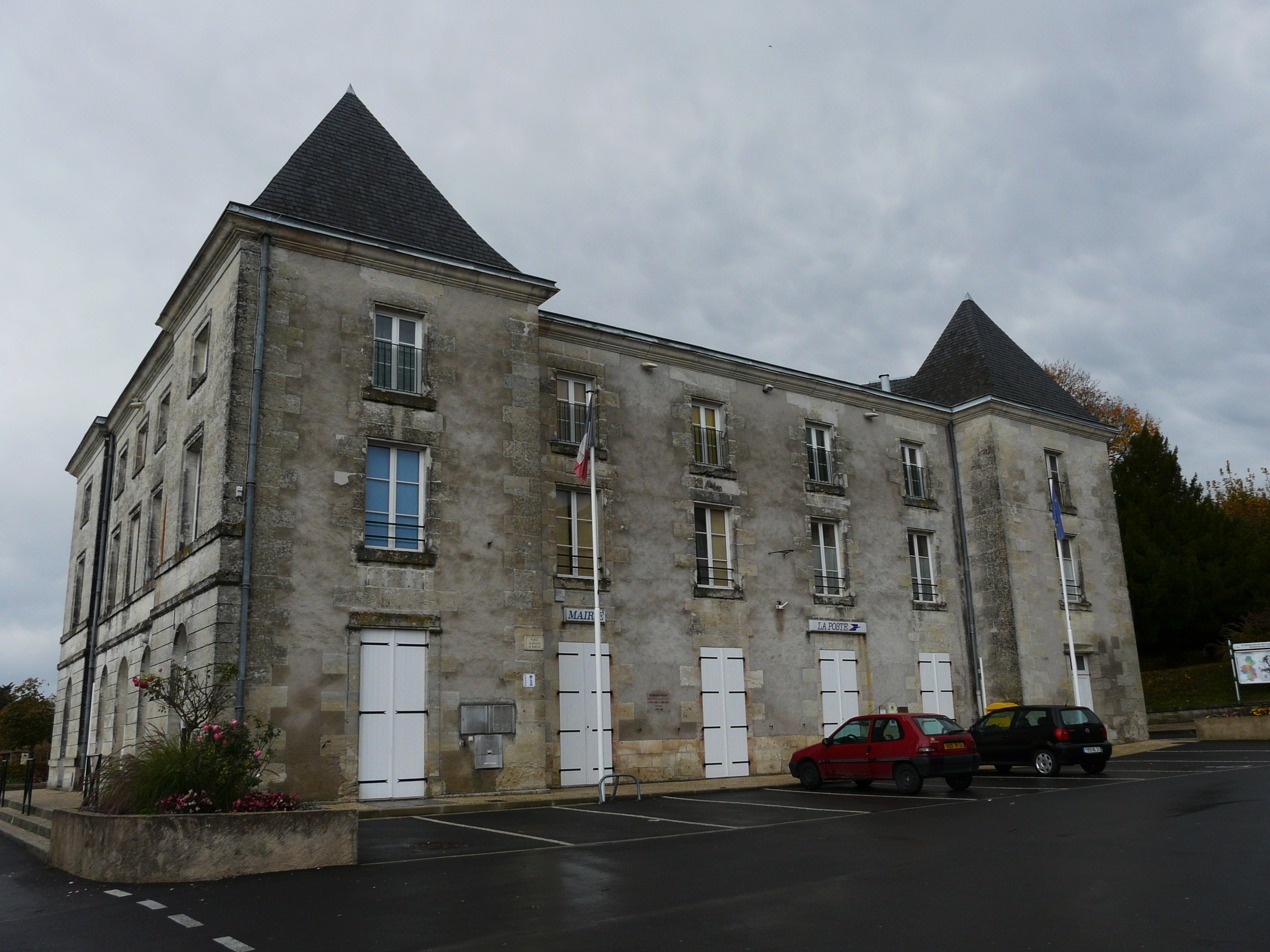
- The town hall in Mensignac
- Location of Mensignac
- Location within France Location within Nouvelle-Aquitaine
- Coordinates: 45°13′34″N 0°33′42″E
- Country: France
- Region: Nouvelle-Aquitaine
- Department: Dordogne
- Arrondissement: Périgueux
- Canton: Saint-Astier
- Intercommunality: Le Grand Périgueux

Government
  - Mayor (2020–2026): Véronique Chabreyrou
- Area^{1}: 26.08 km^{2} (10.07 sq mi)
- Elevation: 170 m (560 ft)
- Highest elevation: 231 m (758 ft)
- Lowest elevation: 92 m (302 ft)
- Population (2023): 1,521
  - Density: 58.32/km^{2} (151.0/sq mi)
- Time zone: UTC+01:00 (CET)
  - Summer (DST): UTC+02:00 (CEST)
- INSEE/Postal code: 24266 /24350
- ^{1} French Land Register data, which excludes lakes, ponds, glaciers > 1 km^{2} (0.386 sq mi or 247 acres) and river estuaries.

Mensignac (French pronunciation: [mɑ̃siɲak]; Occitan: Mencinhac) is a commune in the Dordogne department in Nouvelle-Aquitaine in southwestern France.

== Population ==
Historical population
Year	Pop.	±% p.a.
1968	762	—
1975	902	+2.44%
1982	1,034	+1.97%
1990	1,127	+1.08%
1999	1,136	+0.09%
2007	1,345	+2.13%
2012	1,503	+2.25%
2017	1,521	+0.24%
2023	1,521	+0.00%
Source: INSEE

== See also ==
- Communes of the Dordogne department
