= Annesse-et-Beaulieu =

- Commune
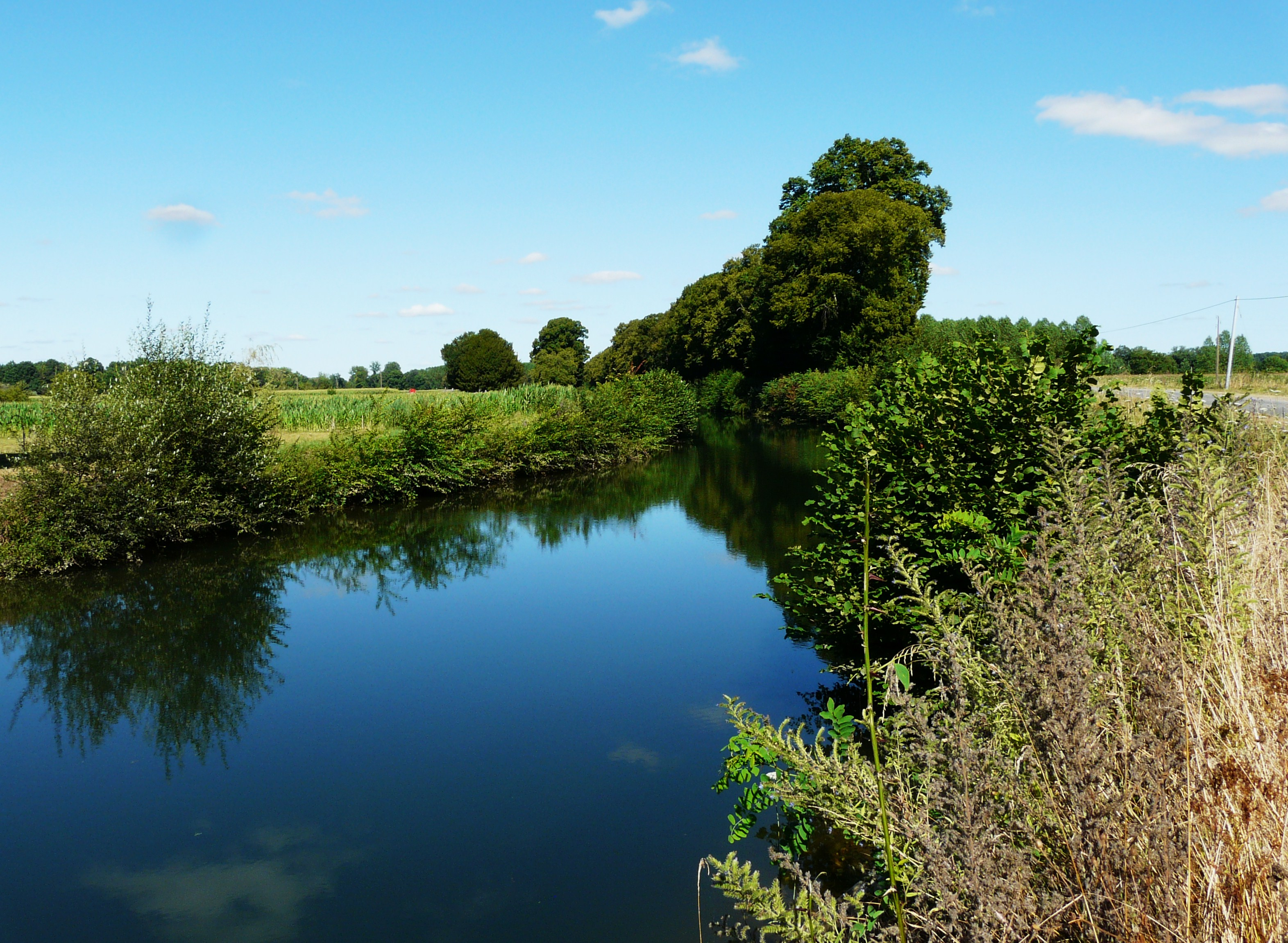
- The Annesse canal
- Location of Annesse-et-Beaulieu
- Location within France Location within Nouvelle-Aquitaine
- Coordinates: 45°10′30″N 0°35′31″E
- Country: France
- Region: Nouvelle-Aquitaine
- Department: Dordogne
- Arrondissement: Périgueux
- Canton: Saint-Astier
- Intercommunality: Le Grand Périgueux

Government
  - Mayor (2020–2026): Philippe Perperot
- Area^{1}: 12.12 km^{2} (4.68 sq mi)
- Elevation: 72 m (236 ft)
- Highest elevation: 169 m (554 ft)
- Lowest elevation: 65 m (213 ft)
- Population (2023): 1,511
  - Density: 124.7/km^{2} (322.9/sq mi)
- Time zone: UTC+01:00 (CET)
  - Summer (DST): UTC+02:00 (CEST)
- INSEE/Postal code: 24010 /24430
- ^{1} French Land Register data, which excludes lakes, ponds, glaciers > 1 km^{2} (0.386 sq mi or 247 acres) and river estuaries.

Annesse-et-Beaulieu (French pronunciation: [anɛs e boljø]; Occitan: Anessa e Beuluòc) is a commune in the Dordogne department in Nouvelle-Aquitaine in southwestern France.

== Population ==
Historical population
Year	Pop.	±% p.a.
1968	553	—
1975	631	+1.90%
1982	826	+3.92%
1990	1,099	+3.63%
1999	1,246	+1.40%
2007	1,442	+1.84%
2012	1,488	+0.63%
2017	1,436	−0.71%
2023	1,511	+0.85%
Source: INSEE

== See also ==
- Communes of the Dordogne département
