= Canton of Saint-Astier =

Coordinates: 45.15°N 0.53°E

The canton of Saint-Astier is an administrative division of the Dordogne department, southwestern France. Its borders were modified at the French canton reorganisation which came into effect in March 2015. Its seat is in Saint-Astier.

It consists of the following communes:

1. Annesse-et-Beaulieu
2. La Chapelle-Gonaguet
3. Coursac
4. Grignols
5. Jaure
6. Léguillac-de-l'Auche
7. Manzac-sur-Vern
8. Mensignac
9. Montrem
10. Saint-Astier
11. Saint-Léon-sur-l'Isle
