= Montrem =

- Commune
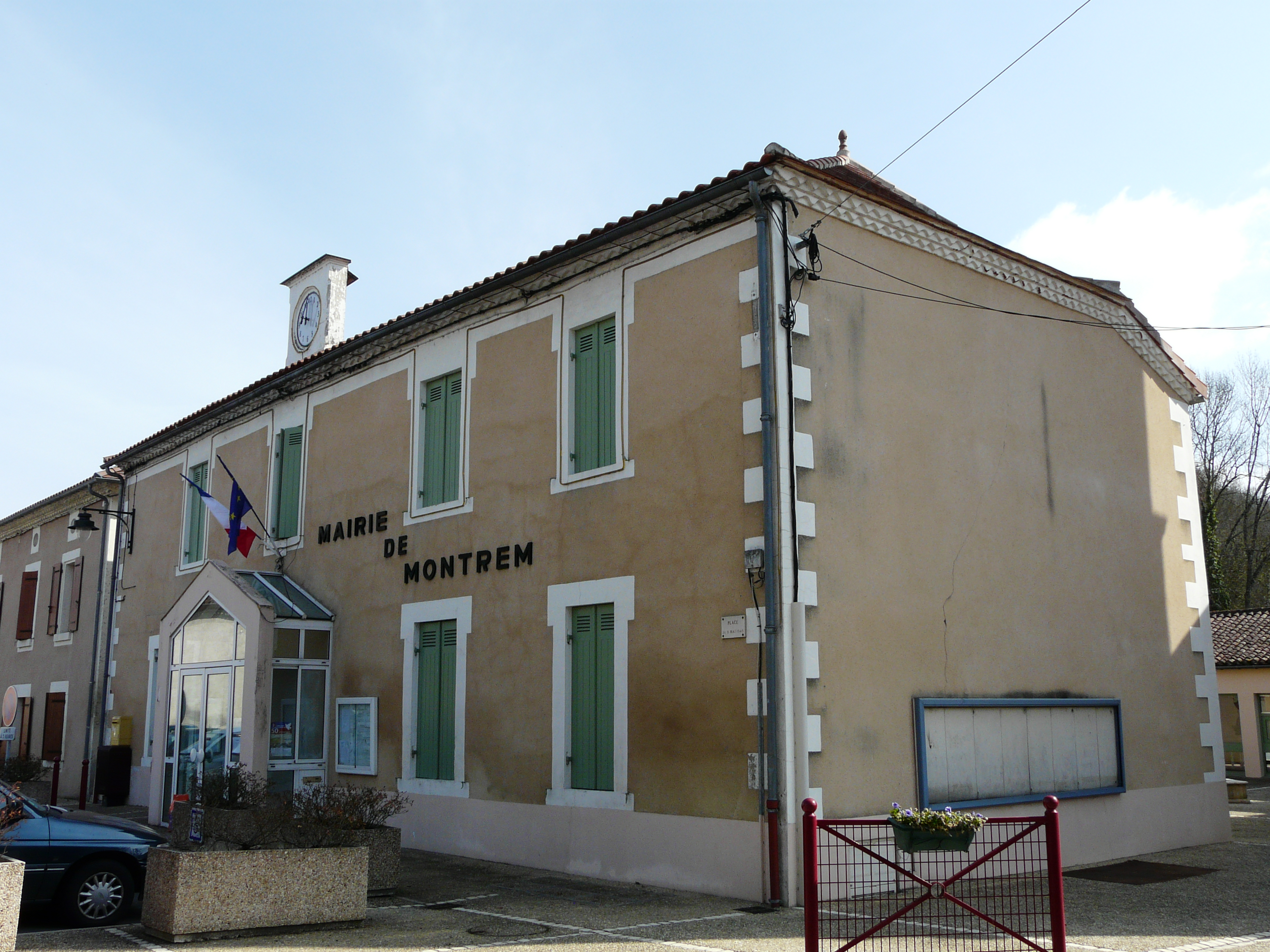
- The town hall in Montrem
- Location of Montrem
- Location within France Location within Nouvelle-Aquitaine
- Coordinates: 45°09′04″N 0°34′32″E
- Country: France
- Region: Nouvelle-Aquitaine
- Department: Dordogne
- Arrondissement: Périgueux
- Canton: Saint-Astier

Government
  - Mayor (2020–2026): Sylvie Bouton
- Area^{1}: 20.15 km^{2} (7.78 sq mi)
- Elevation: 70 m (230 ft)
- Highest elevation: 217 m (712 ft)
- Lowest elevation: 65 m (213 ft)
- Population (2023): 1,208
  - Density: 59.95/km^{2} (155.3/sq mi)
- Time zone: UTC+01:00 (CET)
  - Summer (DST): UTC+02:00 (CEST)
- INSEE/Postal code: 24295 /24110
- ^{1} French Land Register data, which excludes lakes, ponds, glaciers > 1 km^{2} (0.386 sq mi or 247 acres) and river estuaries.

Montrem is a commune in the Dordogne department in Nouvelle-Aquitaine in southwestern France.

== Population ==
Historical population
Year	Pop.	±% p.a.
1968	770	—
1975	913	+2.46%
1982	982	+1.05%
1990	1,045	+0.78%
1999	1,049	+0.04%
2007	1,199	+1.68%
2012	1,261	+1.01%
2017	1,250	−0.18%
2023	1,208	−0.57%
Source: INSEE

== See also ==
- Communes of the Dordogne department
