= Jaure =

- Commune
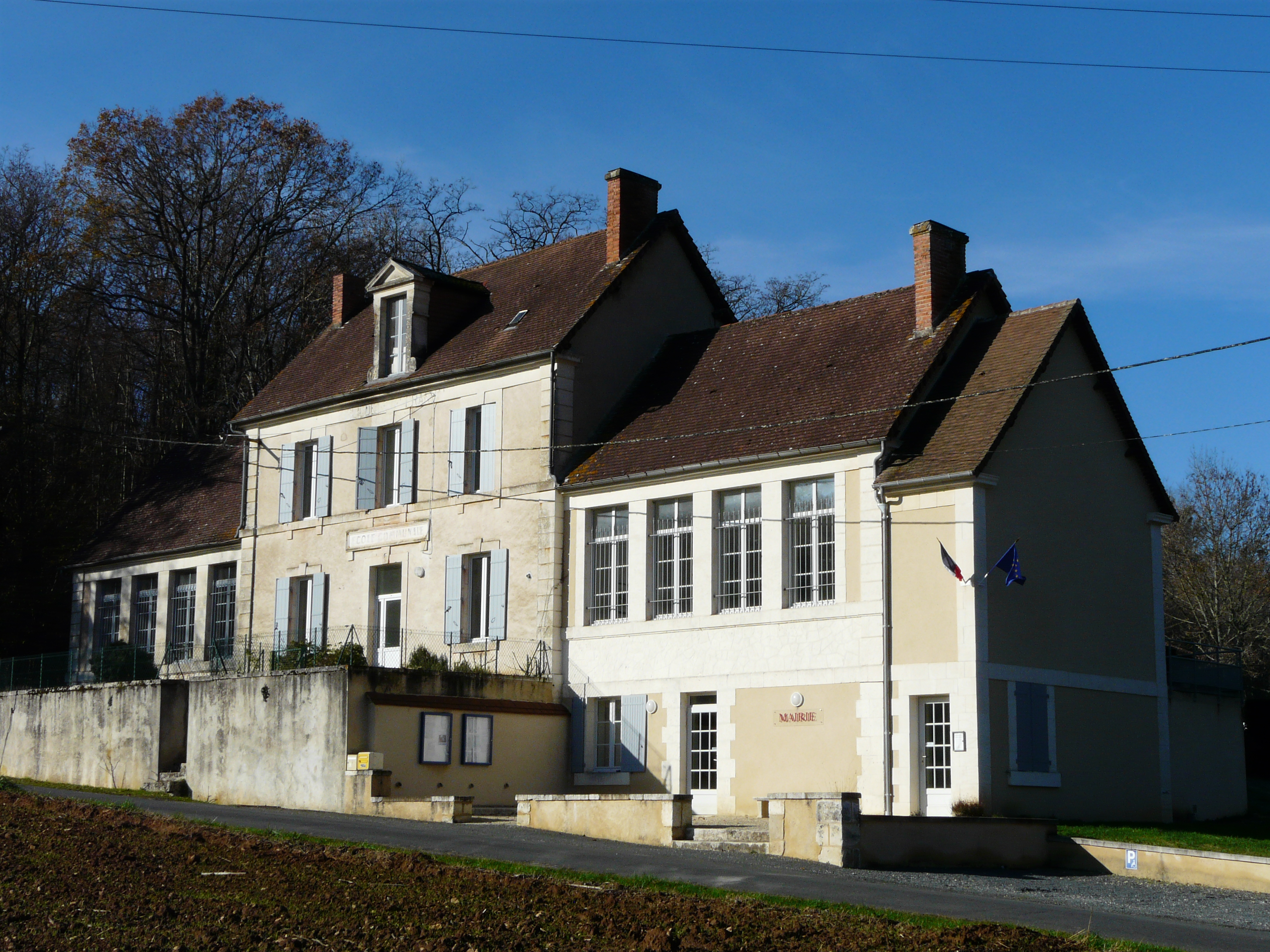
- The town hall in Jaure

- Coat of arms
- Location of Jaure
- Location within France Location within Nouvelle-Aquitaine
- Coordinates: 45°03′27″N 0°33′17″E
- Country: France
- Region: Nouvelle-Aquitaine
- Department: Dordogne
- Arrondissement: Périgueux
- Canton: Saint-Astier

Government
  - Mayor (2020–2026): Philippe de Séverac
- Area^{1}: 7.54 km^{2} (2.91 sq mi)
- Elevation: 141 m (463 ft)
- Highest elevation: 221 m (725 ft)
- Lowest elevation: 93 m (305 ft)
- Population (2023): 178
  - Density: 23.6/km^{2} (61.1/sq mi)
- Time zone: UTC+01:00 (CET)
  - Summer (DST): UTC+02:00 (CEST)
- INSEE/Postal code: 24213 /24140
- ^{1} French Land Register data, which excludes lakes, ponds, glaciers > 1 km^{2} (0.386 sq mi or 247 acres) and river estuaries.

Jaure (French pronunciation: [ʒɔʁ]) is a commune in the Dordogne department in Nouvelle-Aquitaine in southwestern France.

== Population ==
Historical population
Year	Pop.	±% p.a.
1968	140	—
1975	124	−1.72%
1982	158	+3.52%
1990	143	−1.24%
1999	140	−0.24%
2007	148	+0.70%
2012	155	+0.93%
2017	170	+1.86%
2023	178	+0.77%
Source: INSEE

== See also ==
- Communes of the Dordogne department
