= Guillaume de Montrevel =

Medieval French knight and diplomat

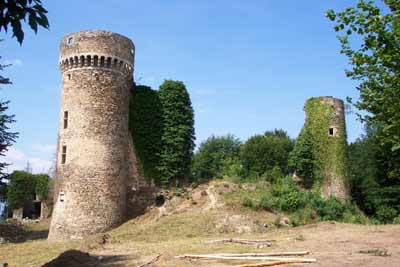
Castle de la Faye.

Guillaume de Montrevel was a medieval French knight, courtier and diplomat.

He led a crusade against the Teutonic Knights in Prussia, at the service of the Duke of Bourbon, and was present at the battles of Rosebecque, Verneuil, and Bourbourg. He was later Counsellor and Chamberlain to the Duke of Bourbon and later to the King of France, and tutor to the Dauphin. He also acted as diplomat to Cyprus, Aragon and England.

He also expanded his castle, Château de la Faye including constructing the northeast tower.

His two sons died at the Battle of Agincourt and one of his two daughters married Guillaume de Charriol. He died in December 1413.
