= Saint-Léon-sur-l'Isle =

- Commune
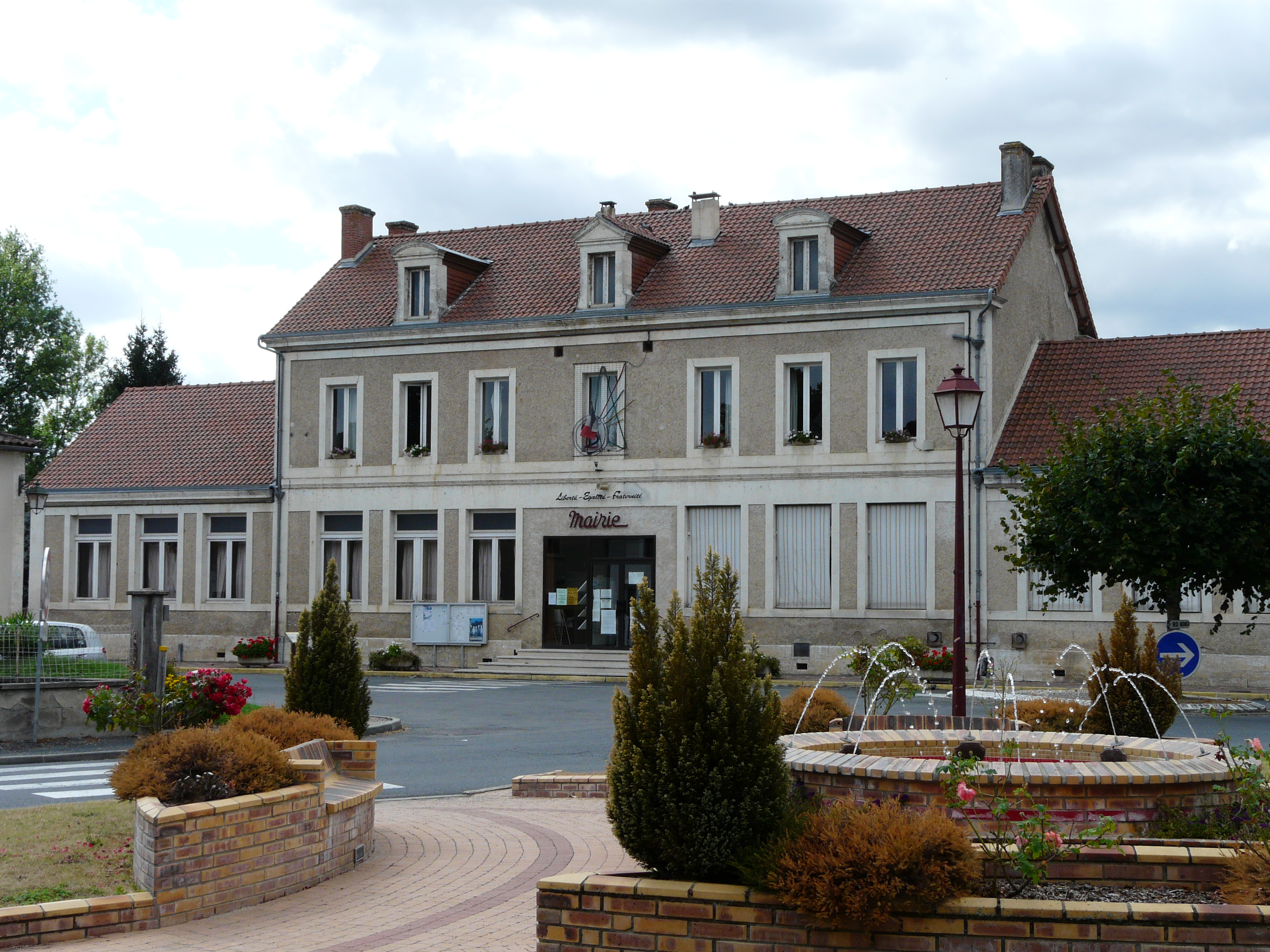
- The town hall in Saint-Léon-sur-l'Isle
- Location of Saint-Léon-sur-l'Isle
- Location within France Location within Nouvelle-Aquitaine
- Coordinates: 45°06′56″N 0°30′19″E
- Country: France
- Region: Nouvelle-Aquitaine
- Department: Dordogne
- Arrondissement: Périgueux
- Canton: Saint-Astier
- Intercommunality: Isle Vern Salembre en Périgord

Government
  - Mayor (2020–2026): Gérard Saurin
- Area^{1}: 14.78 km^{2} (5.71 sq mi)
- Elevation: 73 m (240 ft)
- Highest elevation: 192 m (630 ft)
- Lowest elevation: 56 m (184 ft)
- Population (2023): 2,080
  - Density: 141/km^{2} (364/sq mi)
- Time zone: UTC+01:00 (CET)
  - Summer (DST): UTC+02:00 (CEST)
- INSEE/Postal code: 24442 /24110
- ^{1} French Land Register data, which excludes lakes, ponds, glaciers > 1 km^{2} (0.386 sq mi or 247 acres) and river estuaries.

Saint-Léon-sur-l'Isle (French pronunciation: [sɛ̃ le.ɔ̃ syʁ lil], literally Saint Léon on the Isle; Limousin: Sent Leu d’Eila) is a commune in the Dordogne department in Nouvelle-Aquitaine in southwestern France. Saint-Léon-sur-l'Isle station has rail connections to Bordeaux, Périgueux, Brive-la-Gaillarde and Limoges.

== Population ==
Historical population

| Year | Pop. | ±% p.a. |
|---|---|---|
| 1793 | 1,009 | — |
| 1800 | 968 | −0.59% |
| 1806 | 1,037 | +1.15% |
| 1821 | 1,011 | −0.17% |
| 1831 | 1,058 | +0.46% |
| 1836 | 1,073 | +0.28% |
| 1841 | 1,093 | +0.37% |
| 1846 | 1,032 | −1.14% |
| 1851 | 1,062 | +0.57% |
| 1856 | 1,013 | −0.94% |
| 1861 | 998 | −0.30% |
| 1866 | 1,016 | +0.36% |
| 1872 | 913 | −1.77% |
| 1876 | 895 | −0.50% |
| 1881 | 960 | +1.41% |
| 1886 | 985 | +0.52% |
| 1891 | 978 | −0.14% |
| 1896 | 897 | −1.71% |
| 1901 | 918 | +0.46% |

| Year | Pop. | ±% p.a. |
|---|---|---|
| 1906 | 870 | −1.07% |
| 1911 | 786 | −2.01% |
| 1921 | 679 | −1.45% |
| 1926 | 668 | −0.33% |
| 1931 | 676 | +0.24% |
| 1936 | 683 | +0.21% |
| 1946 | 708 | +0.36% |
| 1954 | 745 | +0.64% |
| 1962 | 842 | +1.54% |
| 1968 | 1,436 | +9.31% |
| 1975 | 1,708 | +2.51% |
| 1982 | 1,872 | +1.32% |
| 1990 | 1,934 | +0.41% |
| 1999 | 1,877 | −0.33% |
| 2007 | 1,942 | +0.43% |
| 2012 | 2,054 | +1.13% |
| 2017 | 2,027 | −0.26% |
| 2023 | 2,080 | +0.43% |

Source: EHESS and INSEE (1968-2023)

== See also ==
- Communes of the Dordogne department
