= Manzac-sur-Vern =

- Commune
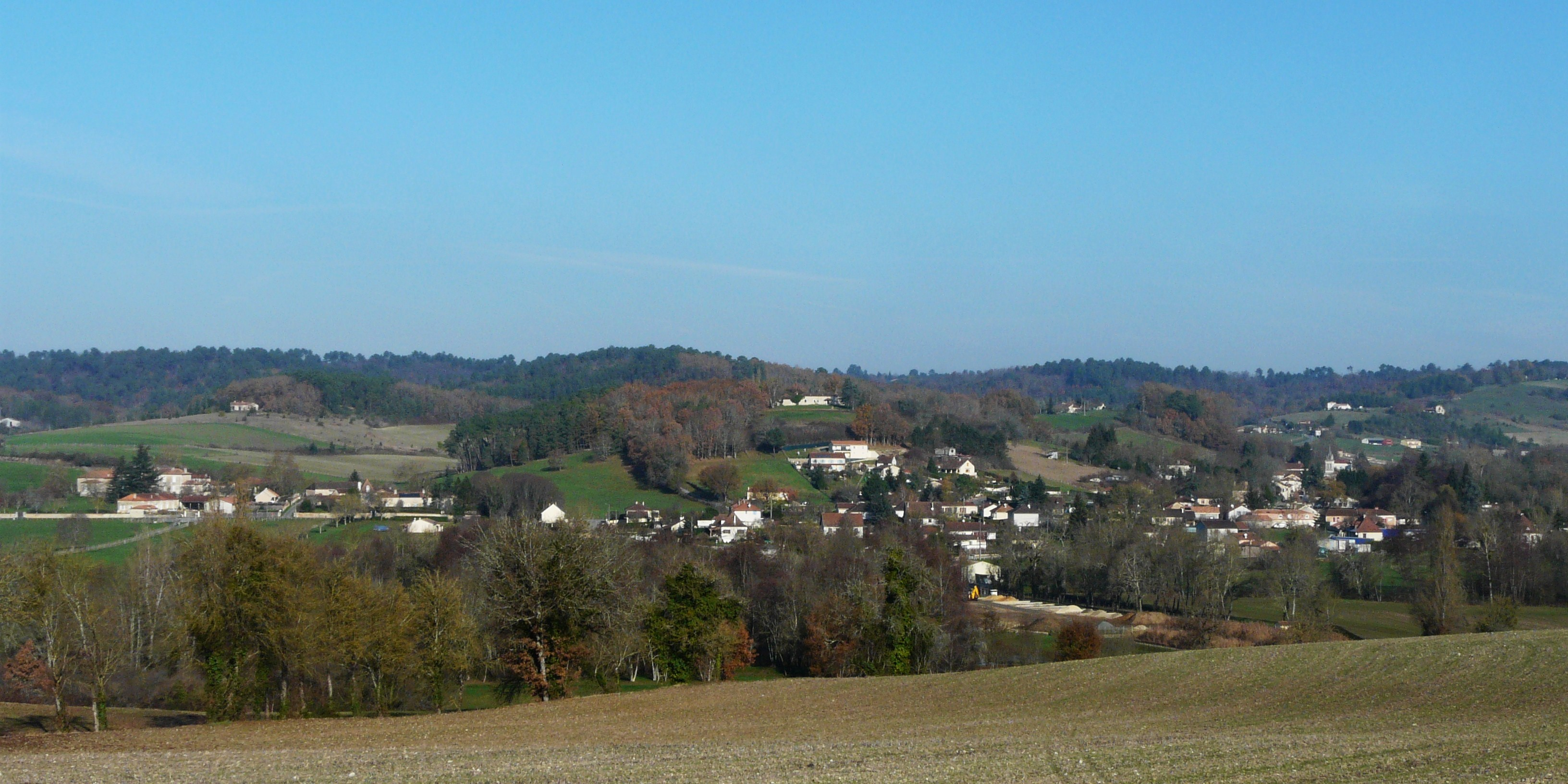
- The village of Manzac-sur-Vern
- Location of Manzac-sur-Vern
- Location within France Location within Nouvelle-Aquitaine
- Coordinates: 45°05′16″N 0°35′11″E
- Country: France
- Region: Nouvelle-Aquitaine
- Department: Dordogne
- Arrondissement: Périgueux
- Canton: Saint-Astier
- Intercommunality: Le Grand Périgueux

Government
  - Mayor (2020–2026): Yannick Rolland
- Area^{1}: 19.96 km^{2} (7.71 sq mi)
- Elevation: 100 m (330 ft)
- Highest elevation: 214 m (702 ft)
- Lowest elevation: 81 m (266 ft)
- Population (2023): 535
  - Density: 26.8/km^{2} (69.4/sq mi)
- Time zone: UTC+01:00 (CET)
  - Summer (DST): UTC+02:00 (CEST)
- INSEE/Postal code: 24251 /24110
- ^{1} French Land Register data, which excludes lakes, ponds, glaciers > 1 km^{2} (0.386 sq mi or 247 acres) and river estuaries.

Manzac-sur-Vern (French pronunciation: [mɑ̃zak syʁ vɛʁn]; Occitan: Manzac de Vern) is a commune in the Dordogne department in Nouvelle-Aquitaine in southwestern France.

== History ==
There are near the town both prehistoric Gallo-Roman traces. In the Middle Ages, Manzac had a former Priory of the Abbey of Brantôme and on November 27, 1911, the commune of Manzac was renamed Manzac-sur-Vern

== Notable residents ==
- Léonce Cubélier de Beynac (1866-1942), poet.
- Christian Pabœuf (1956- ) composer.
- Valentin Huot (1929-2017) cyclist.

== Population ==
Historical population
Year	Pop.	±% p.a.
1968	401	—
1975	420	+0.66%
1982	417	−0.10%
1990	488	+1.98%
1999	505	+0.38%
2007	507	+0.05%
2012	580	+2.73%
2017	593	+0.44%
2023	535	−1.70%
Source: INSEE

== Gallery ==
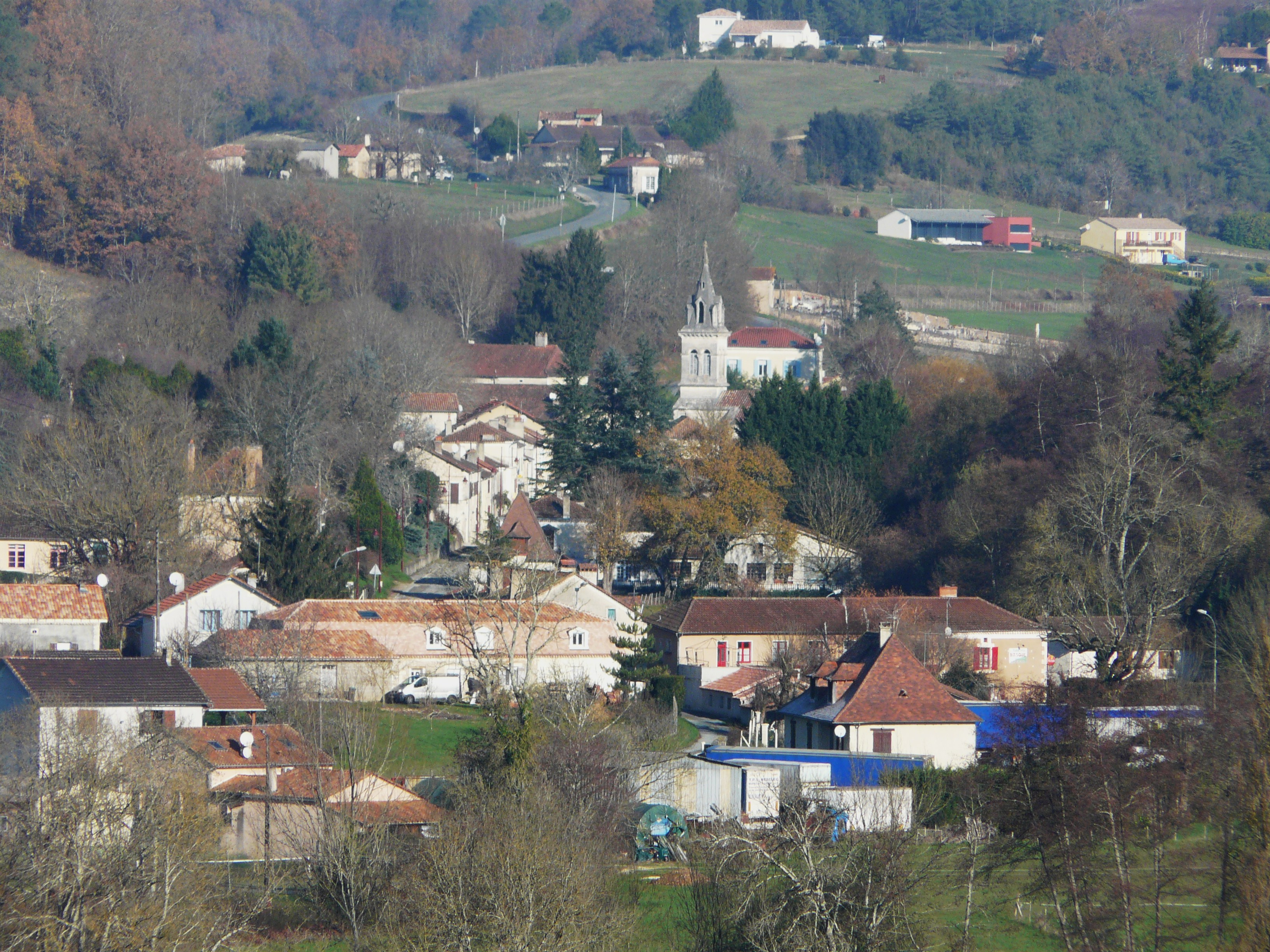
Manzac-sur-Vern village

== Significant landmarks ==
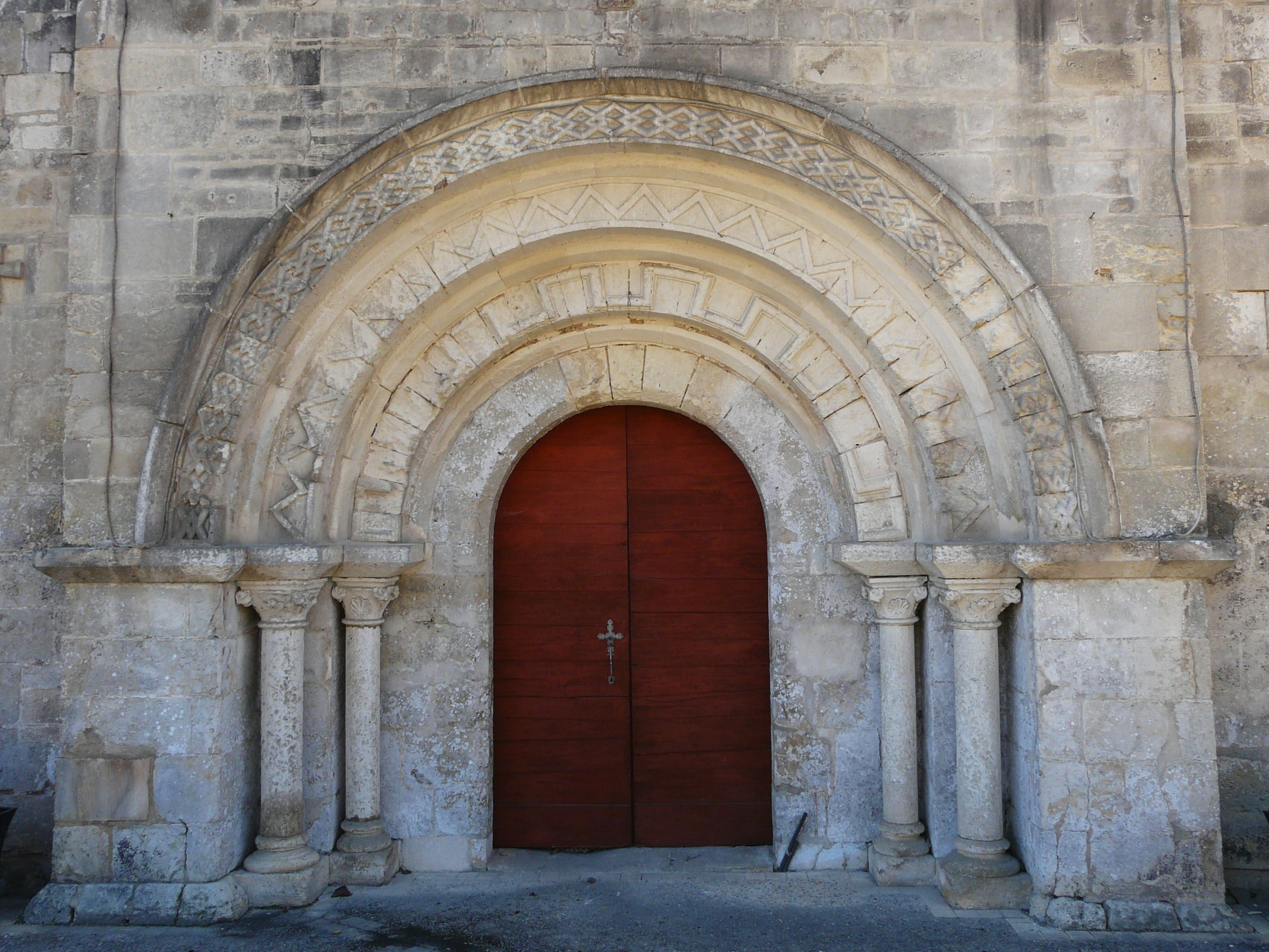
Saint-Pierre-ès-links façard

Significant landmarks include the Saint-Pierre-ès-links a 15th-century church with façade (shown right) dating from the 19th century and Gothic bell tower.

- Chartreuse de la Faye a listed historical site.
- Leyzarnie Castle, rebuilt in the early 20th century, also a listed historic monuments.
- Tower of the former Castle of the Châtenet.
- Chartreuse of Couture.
- Manor de dives du, from the 17th century.
- Cluzeau à Bencharel.

== See also ==
- Communes of the Dordogne department
