= Sainte-Orse =

- Commune
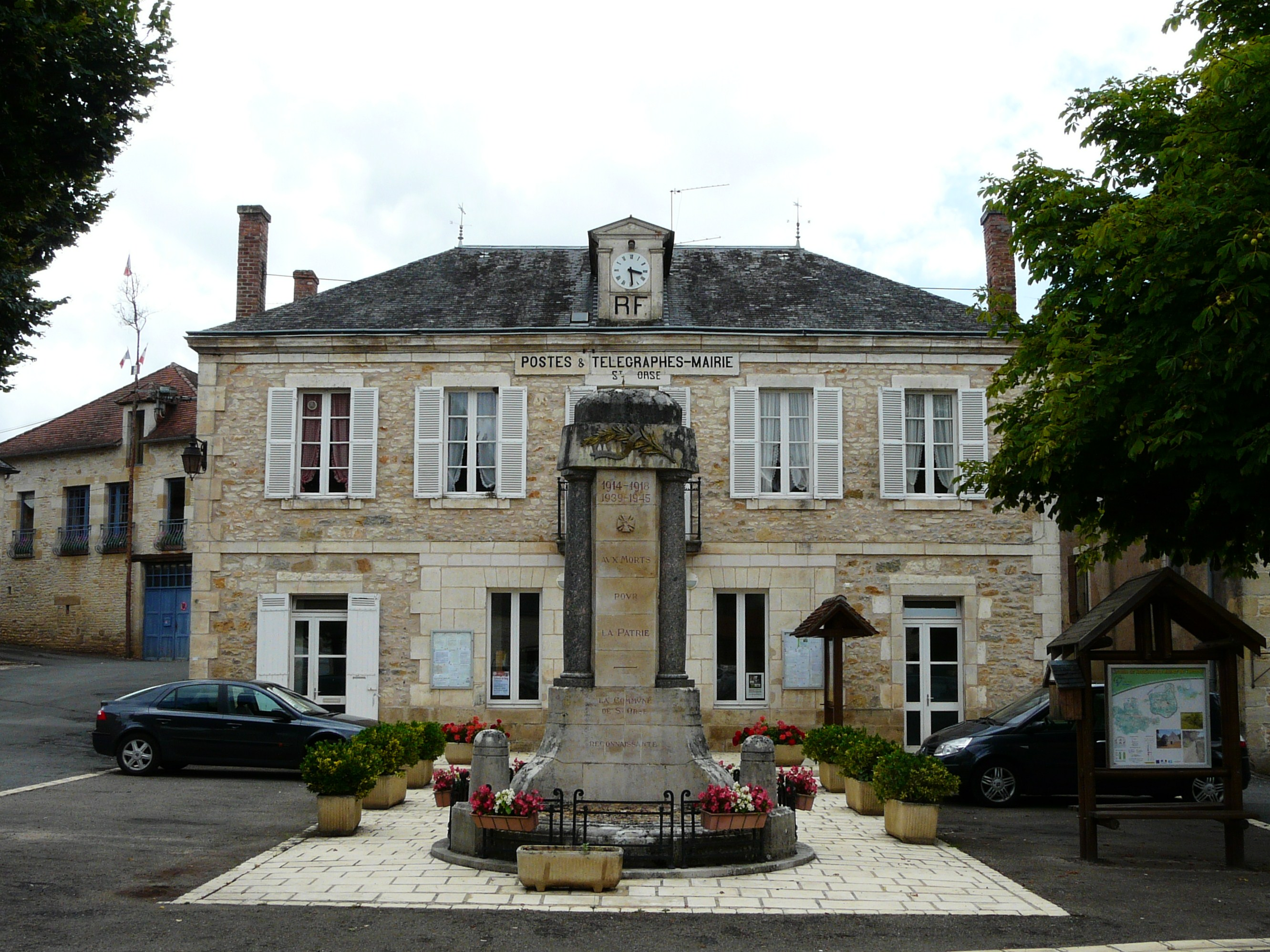
- Post office and town hall
- Location of Sainte-Orse
- Location within France Location within Nouvelle-Aquitaine
- Coordinates: 45°12′16″N 1°04′35″E
- Country: France
- Region: Nouvelle-Aquitaine
- Department: Dordogne
- Arrondissement: Sarlat-la-Canéda
- Canton: Haut-Périgord Noir

Government
  - Mayor (2020–2026): Patrick Delaugeas
- Area^{1}: 23.54 km^{2} (9.09 sq mi)
- Elevation: 231 m (758 ft)
- Highest elevation: 292 m (958 ft)
- Lowest elevation: 163 m (535 ft)
- Population (2023): 346
  - Density: 14.7/km^{2} (38.1/sq mi)
- Time zone: UTC+01:00 (CET)
  - Summer (DST): UTC+02:00 (CEST)
- INSEE/Postal code: 24473 /24210
- ^{1} French Land Register data, which excludes lakes, ponds, glaciers > 1 km^{2} (0.386 sq mi or 247 acres) and river estuaries.

Sainte-Orse (French pronunciation: [sɛ̃.t‿ɔʁs]; Occitan: Senta Orsa) is a commune in the Dordogne department in Nouvelle-Aquitaine in southwestern France. The church of Saint Ursus (Saint Ours) dates from the 11th-12th century. The castle dates from the 15th-16th century.

== Population ==
Historical population
Year	Pop.	±% p.a.
1968	486	—
1975	460	−0.78%
1982	404	−1.84%
1990	372	−1.03%
1999	358	−0.43%
2007	372	+0.48%
2012	388	+0.85%
2017	358	−1.60%
2023	346	−0.57%
Source: INSEE

== Village history ==
The first written reference of the town is the village church, "Sancta Ursa" recorded in the year 1072. The "Cassini map" of France between 1756 and 1789, shows the village under the name of "'Saint Orse"', and during the revolutionary period of the National Convention (1792-1795), the name was "Orse-le-Pierreux".

== Landmarks ==
A number of historic buildings are located in the town:

- Church of Saint-Ours, 11th or 12th century Romanesque Church with a 19th-century bell tower. It is listed as a historical monument since 1970.
- Several Merovingian sarcophagi.
- The Church also preserves a relic of Pope John Paul II (a piece of the belt of the former Pontiff).
- Château de Sainte-Orse, 15th and 16th centuries.
- La Salle gentilhommiere, 18th century, today a school.
- 18th century Manor of La Faye.
- Château de Laudonie Den of Peyre-brune.

== See also ==
- Communes of the Dordogne department
