= Coursac =

- Commune
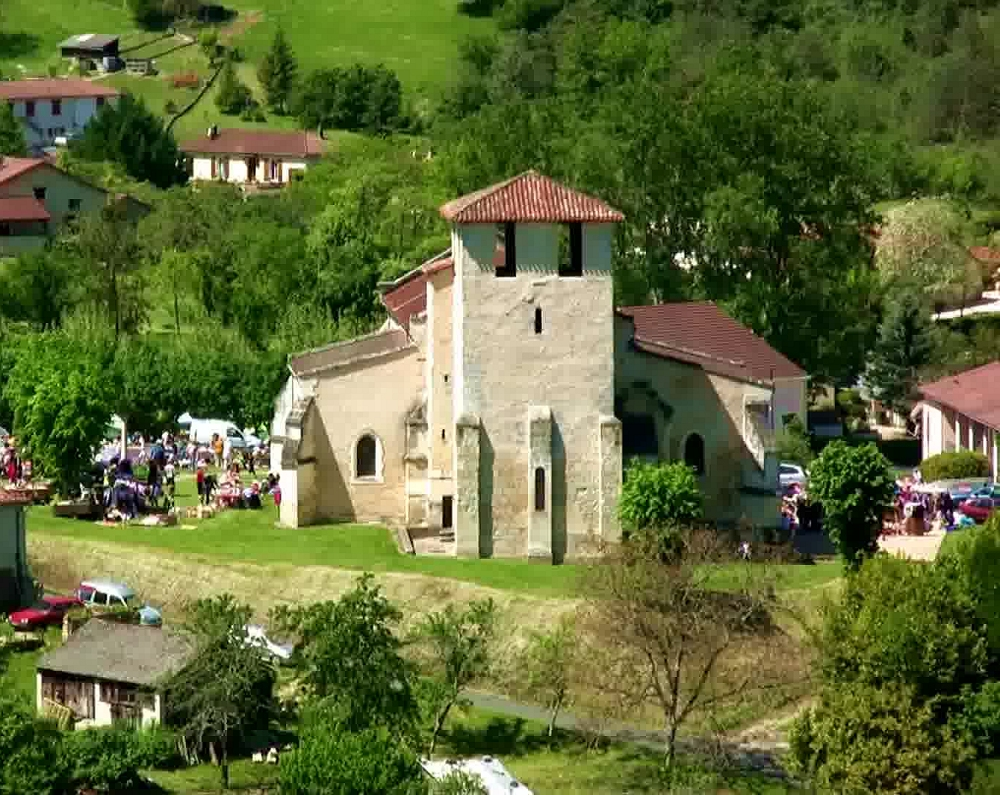
- The church of Coursac

- Coat of arms
- Location of Coursac
- Location within France Location within Nouvelle-Aquitaine
- Coordinates: 45°07′47″N 0°38′22″E
- Country: France
- Region: Nouvelle-Aquitaine
- Department: Dordogne
- Arrondissement: Périgueux
- Canton: Saint-Astier
- Intercommunality: Le Grand Périgueux

Government
  - Mayor (2020–2026): Pascal Protano
- Area^{1}: 24.65 km^{2} (9.52 sq mi)
- Elevation: 135 m (443 ft)
- Highest elevation: 225 m (738 ft)
- Lowest elevation: 89 m (292 ft)
- Population (2023): 2,380
  - Density: 96.6/km^{2} (250/sq mi)
- Time zone: UTC+01:00 (CET)
  - Summer (DST): UTC+02:00 (CEST)
- INSEE/Postal code: 24139 /24430
- ^{1} French Land Register data, which excludes lakes, ponds, glaciers > 1 km^{2} (0.386 sq mi or 247 acres) and river estuaries.

Coursac (French pronunciation: [kuʁsak]; Occitan: Corsac) is a commune in the Dordogne department in Nouvelle-Aquitaine in southwestern France.

== Population ==
Historical population
Year	Pop.	±% p.a.
1968	496	—
1975	549	+1.46%
1982	877	+6.92%
1990	1,175	+3.72%
1999	1,345	+1.51%
2007	1,685	+2.86%
2012	1,998	+3.47%
2017	2,149	+1.47%
2023	2,380	+1.72%
Source: INSEE

== See also ==
- Communes of the Dordogne department
