= Guy de Fayolle =

French philatelist (1882-1944)

- Born: 1882
- Died: 1944 (aged 61–62)
- Occupation: Philatelist

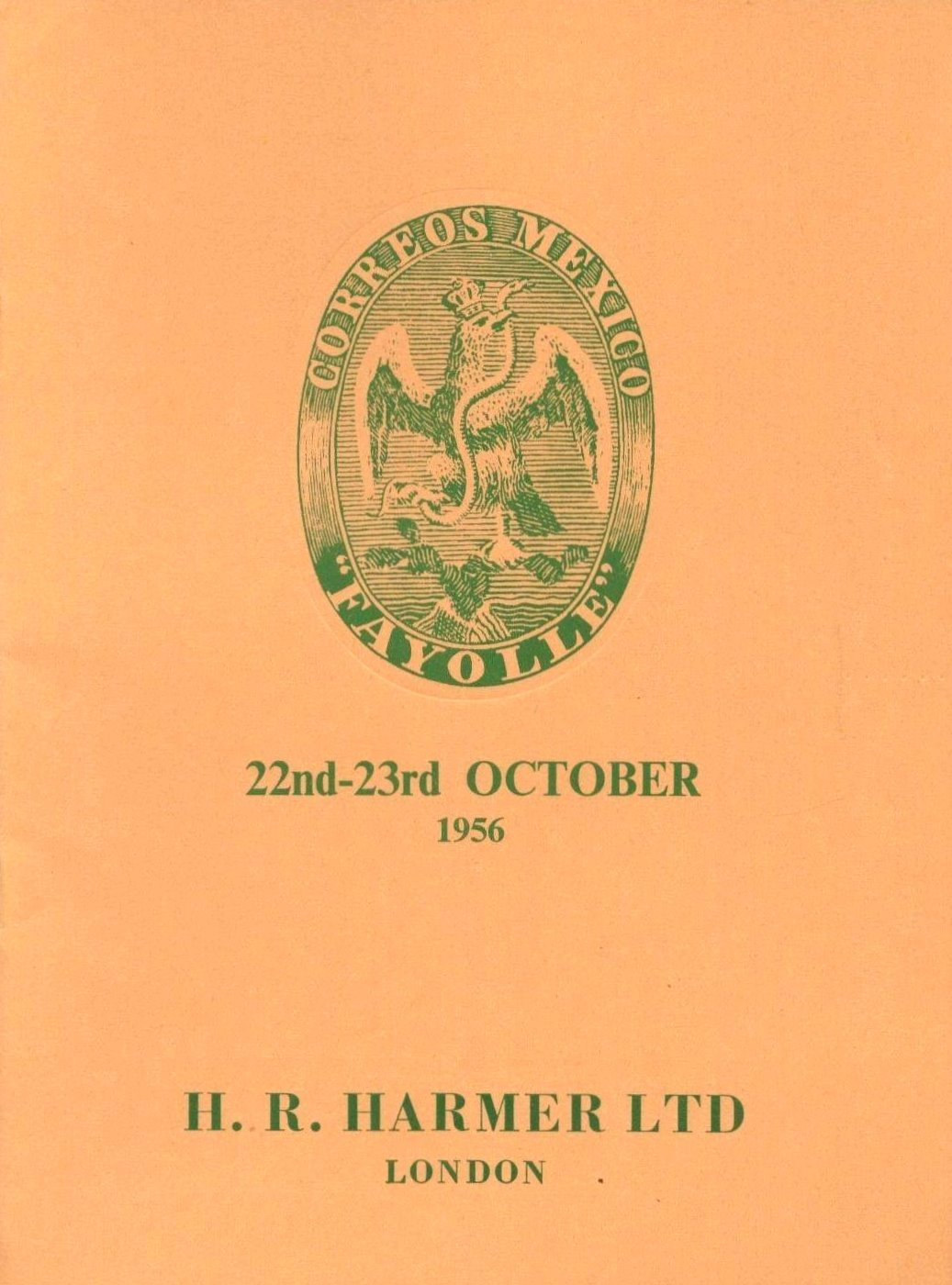
Auction catalogue for the sale of the de Fayolle collection, Harmers 1956.JPG

Marquis Guy de Fayolle (8 July 1882 – 12 March 1944) was a French philatelist who was added to the Roll of Distinguished Philatelists in 1939. In 1913 he won a gold medal at the Exposition Philatelique Internationale in Paris for his display of the stamps of Greece. His collection of the classic stamps of Mexico was sold by Harmers in 1956.

== Selected publications ==
- Les premieres emissions du Mexique (1856 a 1874). 1935. (With Paul de Smeth)
- Catalogue détaillé des timbres du Mexique. 1936.
