= Château de la Faye (Auriac-du-Périgord) =

Castle in Nouvelle-Aquitaine, France

Coordinates: 45.1051°N 1.1262°E

The Château de la Faye is a French castle located in Auriac-du-Périgord, in the Dordogne department of France.

The castle was originally a simple defensive tower built in the 13th century for the defence of Montignac. Towers were later added on the south side—the one on the left in 1359, and the one on the right in the 15th century. The castle is recorded in 1476 as the Faya Fortalitium.

The dwelling portion of the structure dates from the end of the 15th century, consisting of three levels. A tower, which is highlighted by an arched door opening onto the stairs, was added in the 16th century. In the 18th century there were alterations to the roof, including skylights.

It is today a listed monument.

== Gallery ==
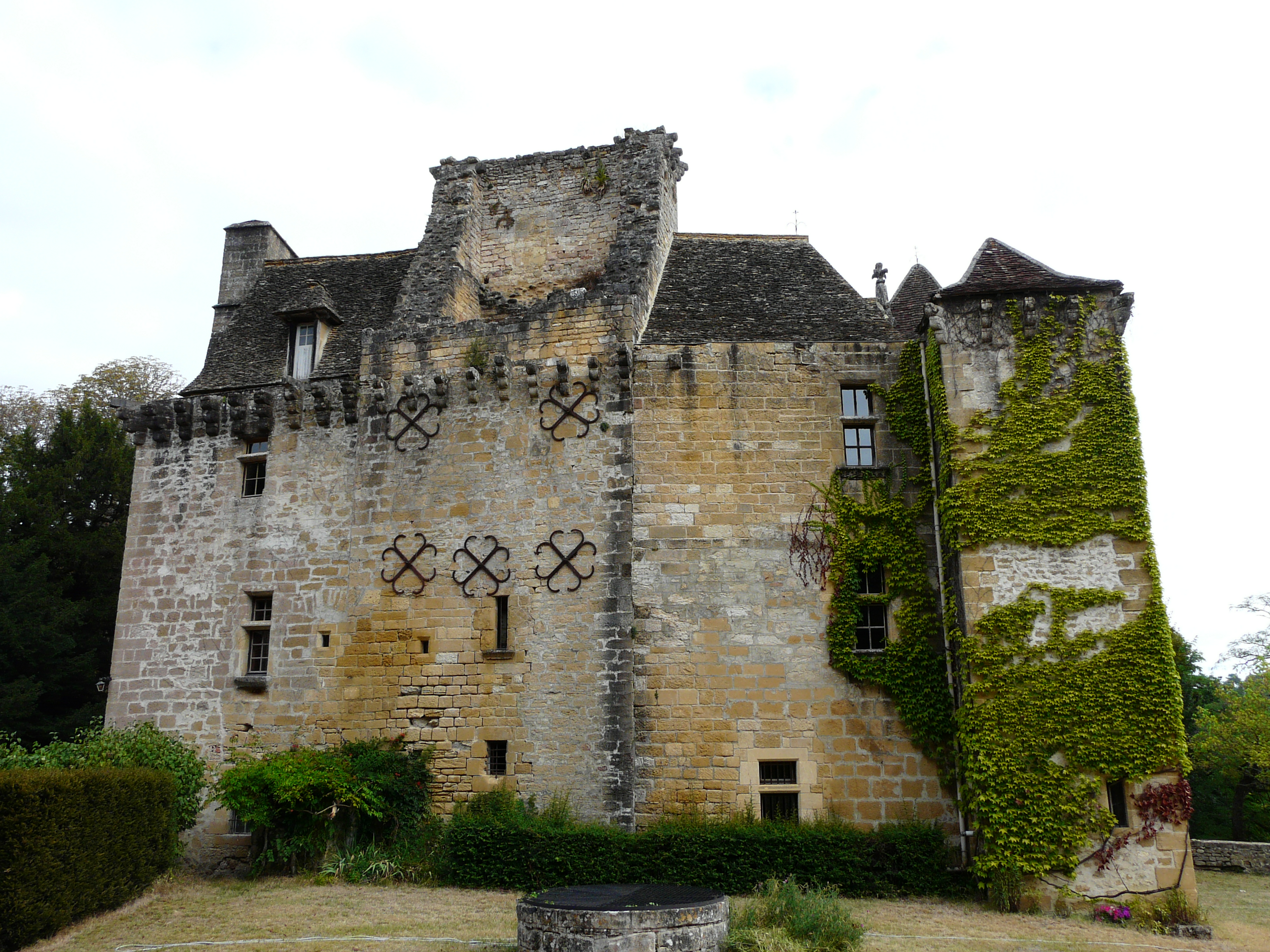
The south facade

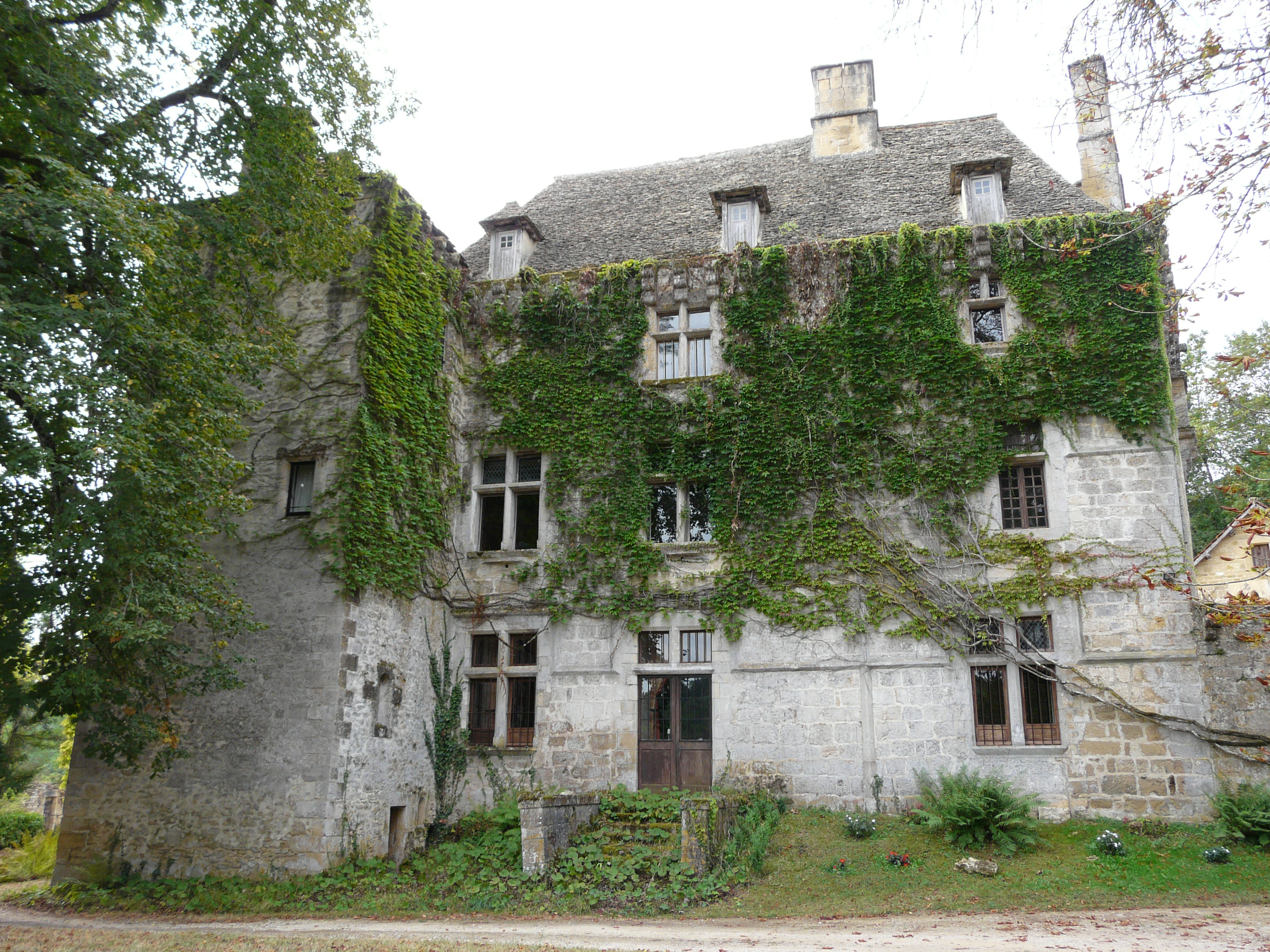
The north facade

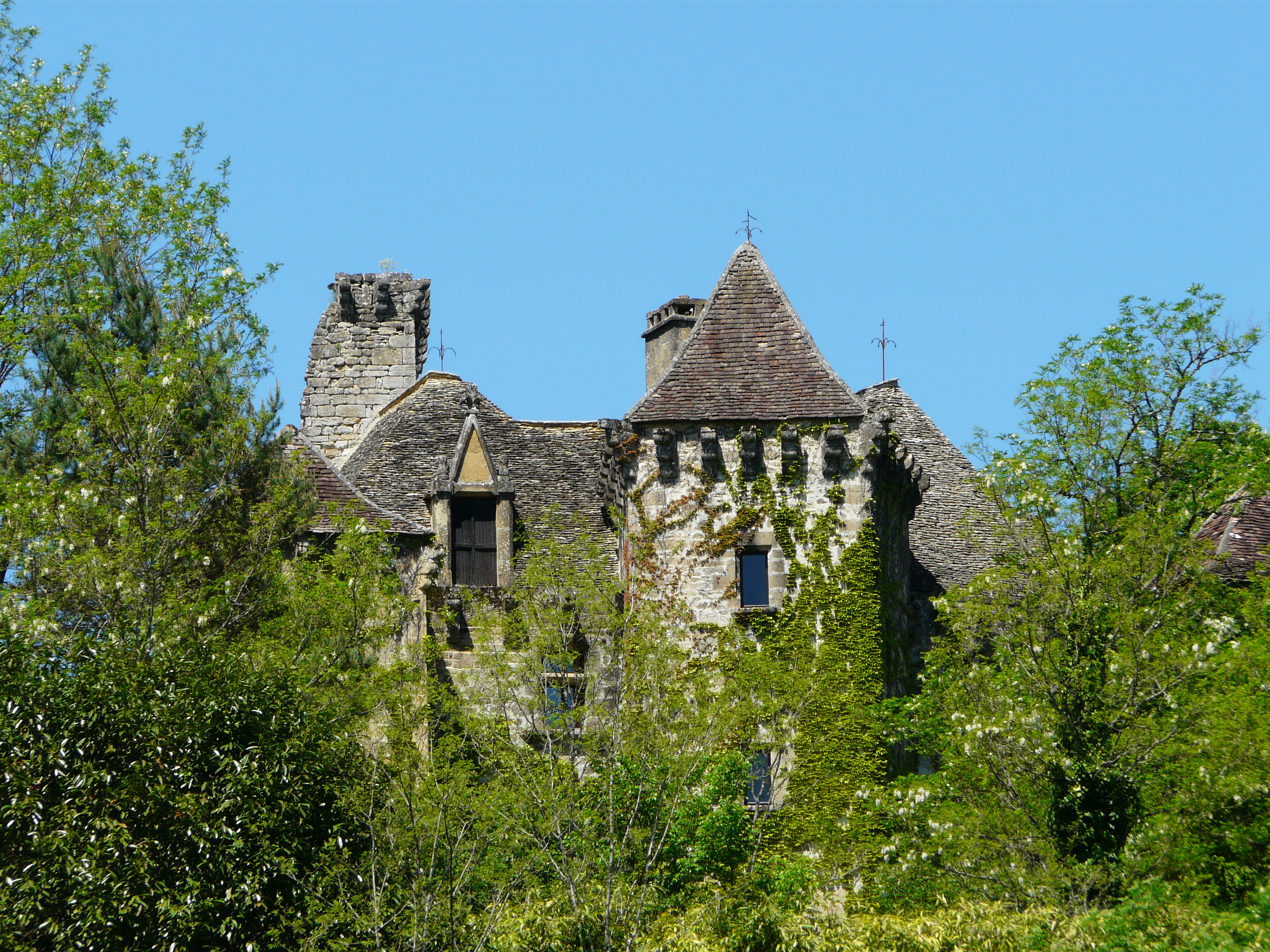
The east side

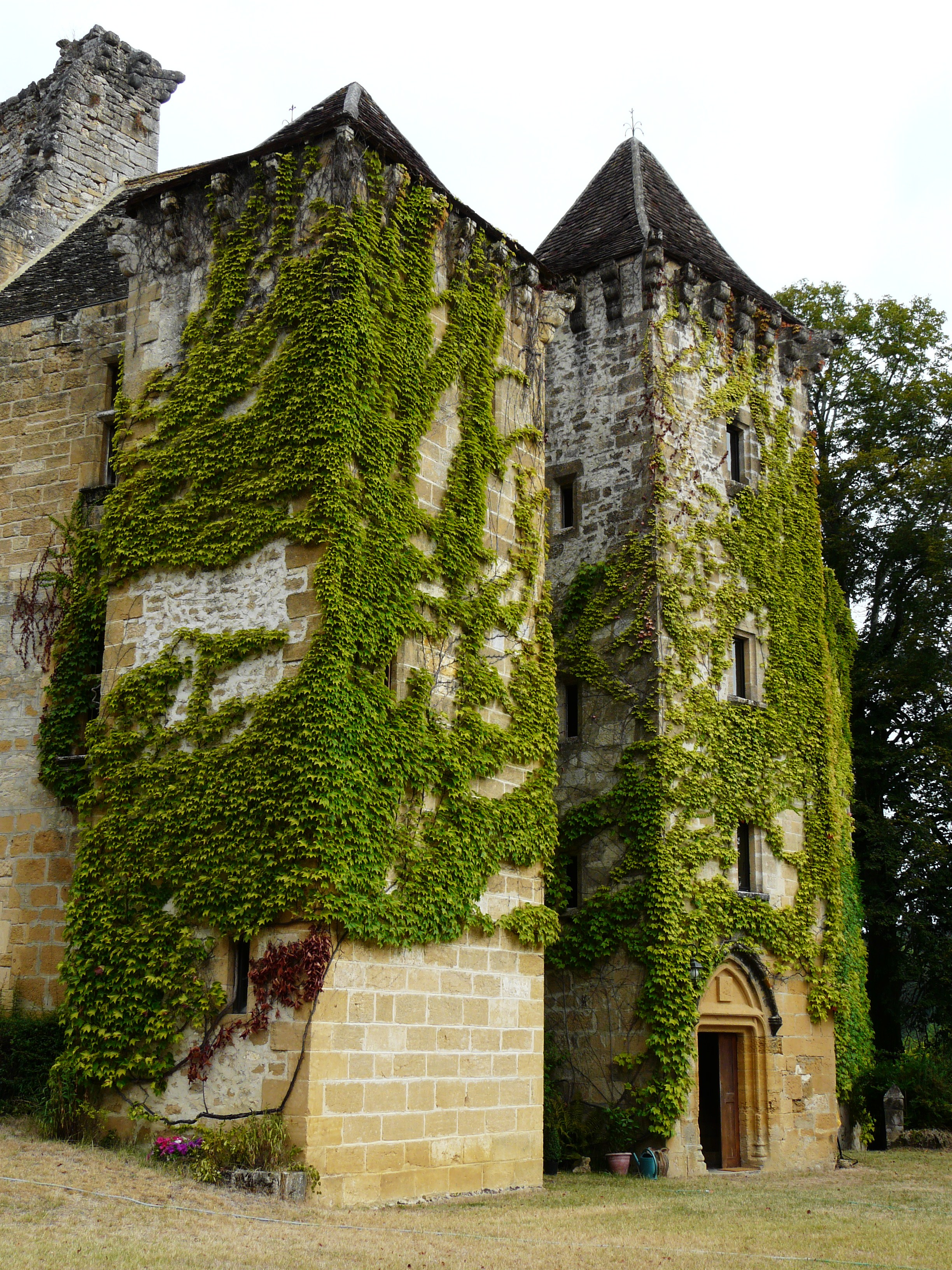
The eastern towers

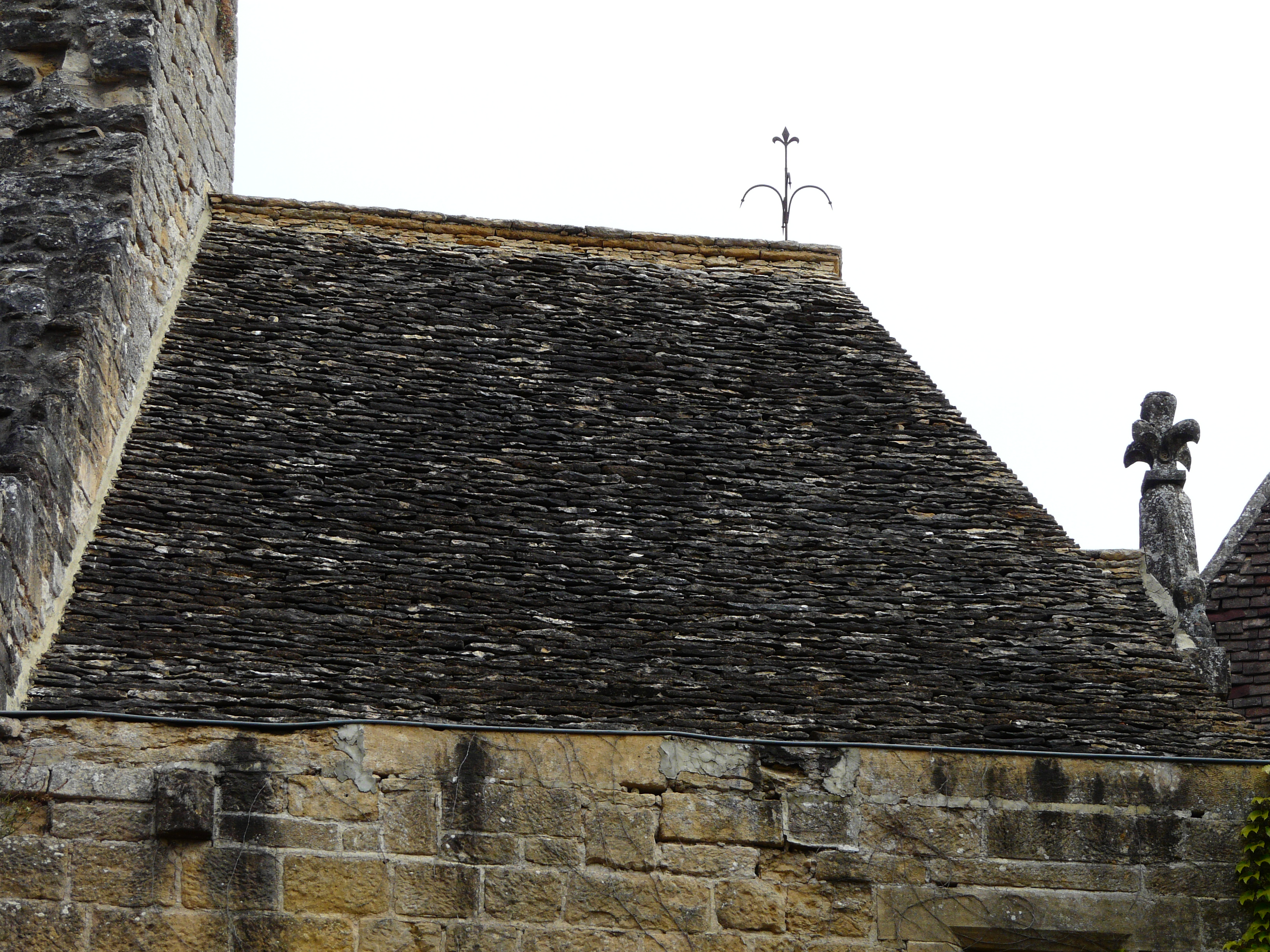
Slate roof

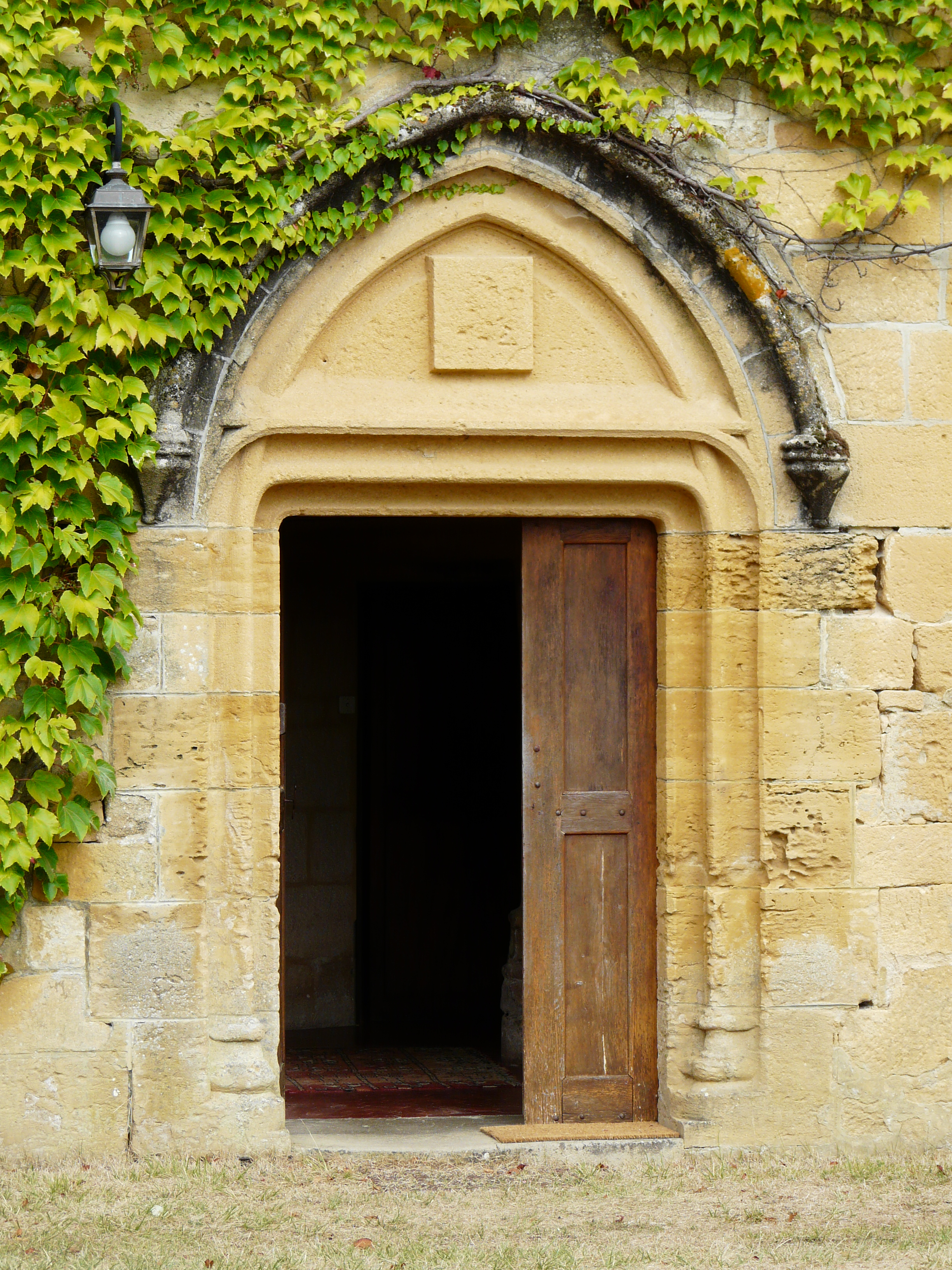
Doorway of the château
