= Léguillac-de-l'Auche =

- Commune
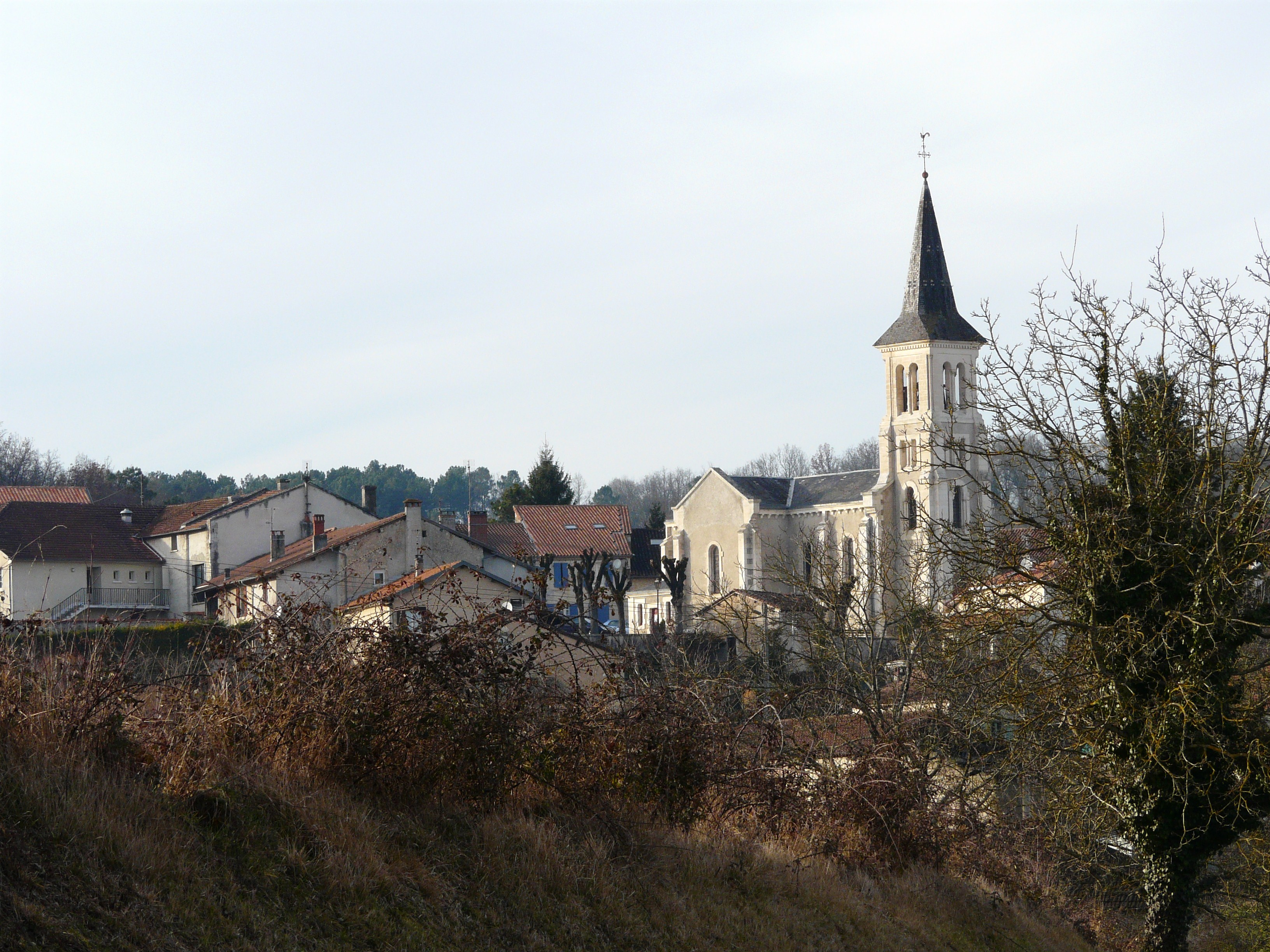
- The church and surroundings in Léguillac-de-l'Auche
- Location of Léguillac-de-l'Auche
- Location within France Location within Nouvelle-Aquitaine
- Coordinates: 45°11′08″N 0°33′27″E
- Country: France
- Region: Nouvelle-Aquitaine
- Department: Dordogne
- Arrondissement: Périgueux
- Canton: Saint-Astier

Government
  - Mayor (2020–2026): Régis Batailler
- Area^{1}: 14.31 km^{2} (5.53 sq mi)
- Elevation: 120 m (390 ft)
- Highest elevation: 227 m (745 ft)
- Lowest elevation: 70 m (230 ft)
- Population (2023): 968
  - Density: 67.6/km^{2} (175/sq mi)
- Time zone: UTC+01:00 (CET)
  - Summer (DST): UTC+02:00 (CEST)
- INSEE/Postal code: 24236 /24110
- ^{1} French Land Register data, which excludes lakes, ponds, glaciers > 1 km^{2} (0.386 sq mi or 247 acres) and river estuaries.

Léguillac-de-l'Auche (French pronunciation: [leɡɥijak də loʃ]; Occitan: Lagulhac de l'Aucha) is a commune in the Dordogne department in Nouvelle-Aquitaine in southwestern France.

== Population ==
Historical population
Year	Pop.	±% p.a.
1968	383	—
1975	377	−0.23%
1982	493	+3.91%
1990	635	+3.21%
1999	636	+0.02%
2007	831	+3.40%
2012	986	+3.48%
2017	994	+0.16%
2023	968	−0.44%
Source: INSEE

== Landmarks ==
- Castle du But, a 15th and 16th centuries, situated on a protected site.
- Château de Faye, former Priory,
- The Feudal era Motte of the Redoubte
- the 19th-century Romanesque Church of Saint-Cloud,
- Ruins of the Priory of La Faye, 13th century.

== See also ==
- Communes of the Dordogne department
