= Château de la Faye (Olmet) =

Castle in Auvergne-Rhône-Alpes, France

Coordinates: 45.7390°N 3.6516°E

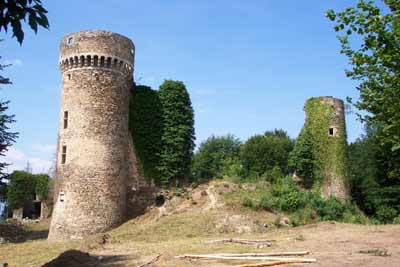
Castle de la Faye

The Château de la Faye is a ruined castle near Olmet, Puy-de-Dôme department of France. It has been a listed historical monument since 1986.

The Castle owes its name to the river flowing past it. Built at the beginning of the 13th century, the castle is today in a state of ruin, but restoration works are undertaken by the owners since 2001.

== History of the castle ==
It was built around 1240, by Couzan en Forez from Meymont d'Auvergne d'Olliergues to control the Faye Giroux River Valley, toward the end of the Hundred Years' War.

Among the most outstanding owners have been Guillaume de Montrevel, who expanded the castle including constructing Northeast Tower and led crusade against the Teutonic Knights in Prussia, at the service of the Duke of Bourbon, count of all neighbouring Foy and who was present at the battles of Rosebecque, Verneuil, and Bourbourg. He was later Counsellor and Chamberlain of the Duke of Bourbon and latter the King and Governor of the Dauphin, and he also acted as diplomate to Cyprus, Aragon and England.

His two sons died at the Battle of Agincourt and one of his two daughters married Guillaume de Charriol. He died in December 1413.

Following Guillaume de Montrevel, the castle passed to his son-in-law Couzan en Forez who built the Southeast Tower and then passed the castle by succession to Frissonet Cabral of Viverols.

Christophe de Cabral bridged internal parts of the Castle and extended the stables opening and who recaptured the town of Mende in the wars with the Huguenot. Cabral bequeathed the Castle to Tallaru Chalmazel who sold it to dame Françoise Simiane de Moucha, widow of the powerful Lord Brulart, Earl of Ronures and she in turn gave it to Jean-Alexis de Provencheres on 23 August 1703 whose family own the site to this day.
