= Château de la Faye (Deviat) =

Manor house in France

Coordinates: 45.4111°N 0.0176°E

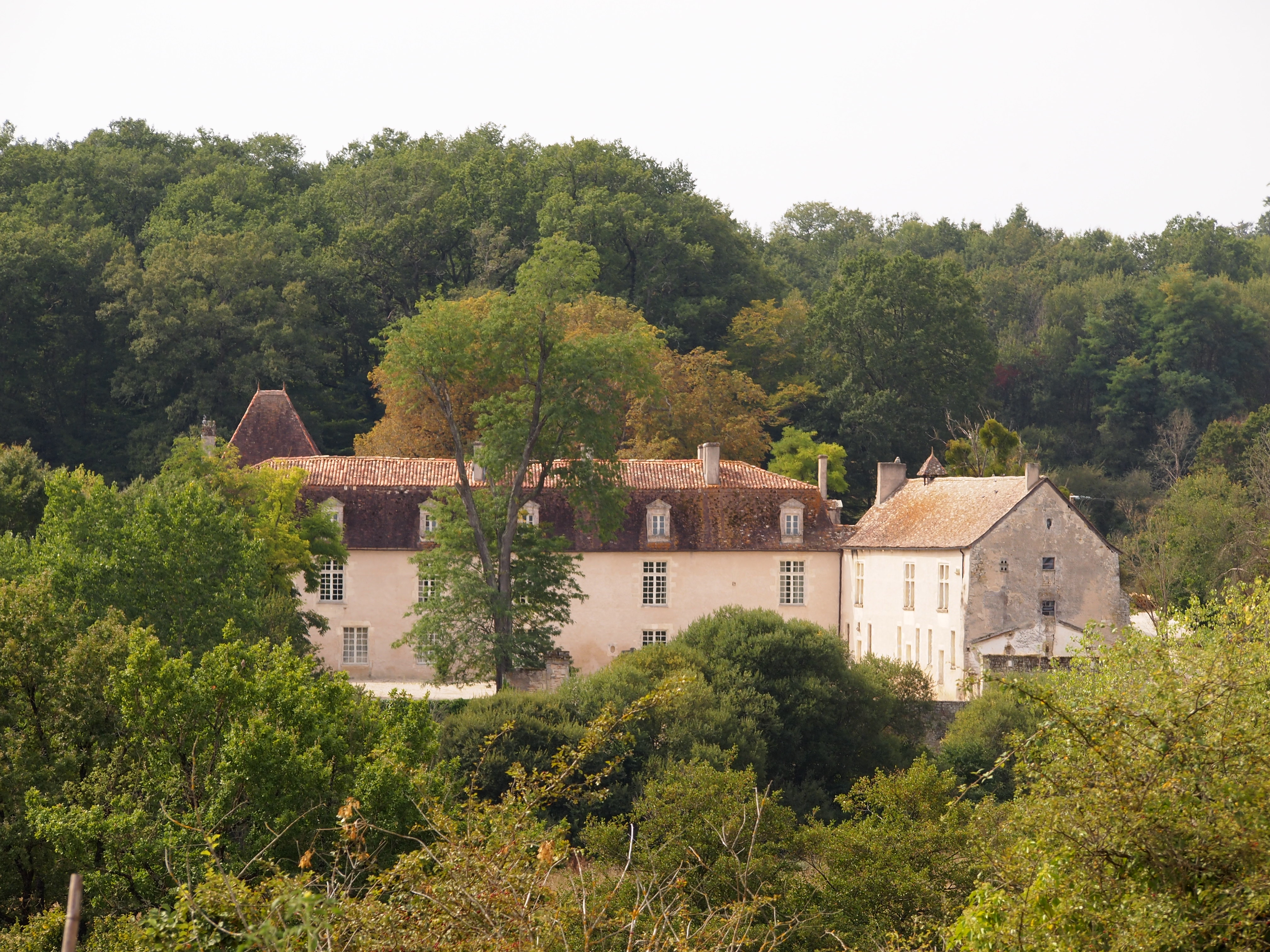
Château de la Faye

The Château de la Faye is a manor house, formerly a fortress, located in the town of Deviat in Charente, France. Built during the Hundred Years' War, the château's ramparts protected the entire population of the town. It has a wide moat and is entered over a bridge with two arches, opening onto a broad esplanade facing the corps de logis. In the 15th century, it was the dowry of Perette de Montendre.

Some 19th-century extensions improved the mansard roof with small triangular pediment dormer windows.

It was listed as an historical monument on October 23, 1992, and is today run as a hotel.
