= Château de Fayolle (Tocane-Saint-Apre) =

Château in Nouvelle-Aquitaine, France

Coordinates: 45°13′45″N 0°29′59″E

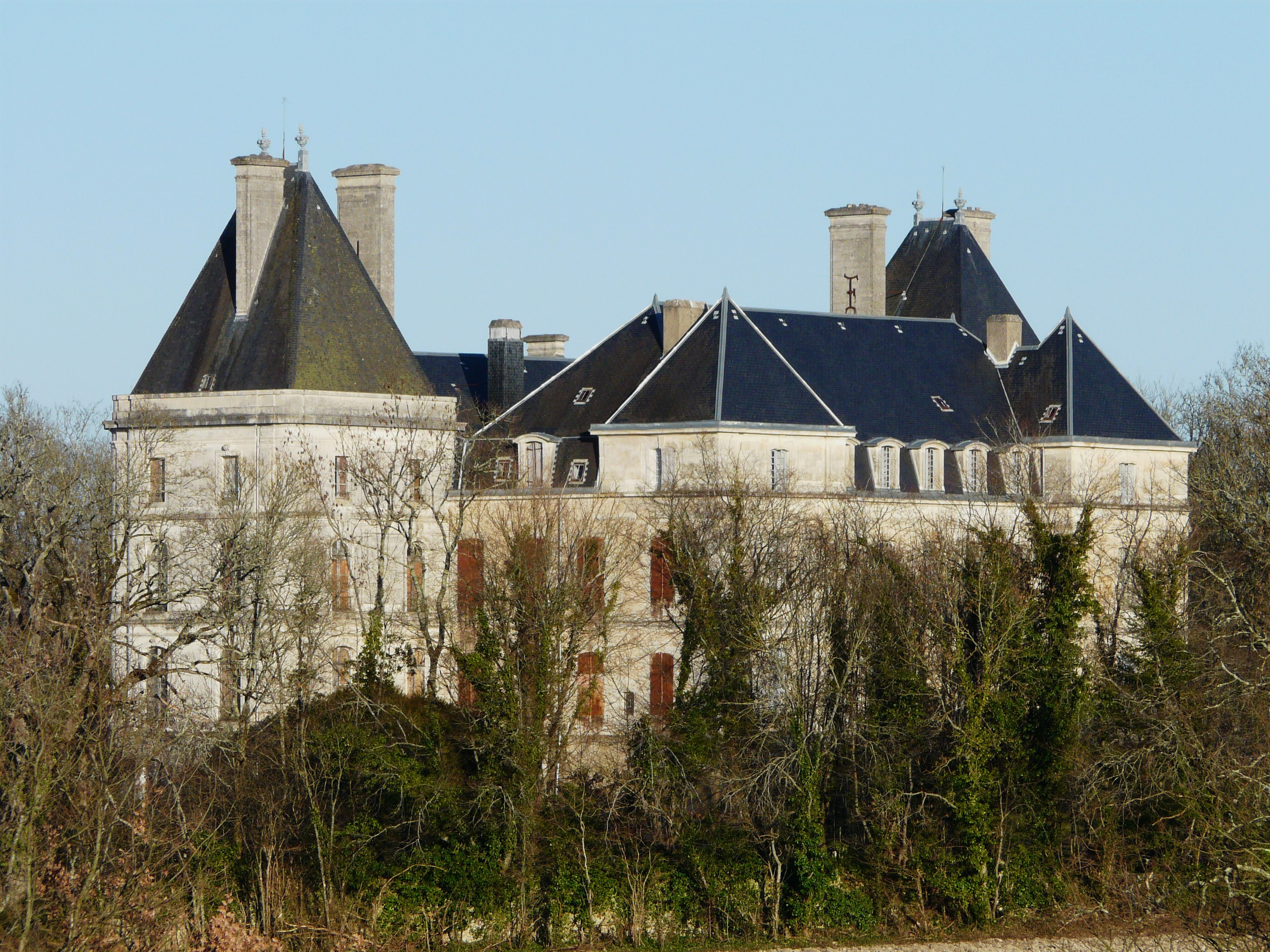
Château de Fayolle

The Château de Fayolle is a château in Tocane-Saint-Apre, Dordogne, Nouvelle-Aquitaine, France.

== Architecture ==
The castle, located in the west of the Dordogne department, consists of two parallel logis joined by lateral walls and terminated at each end by protruding pavilions
It has been registered as a historical monument by the French Ministry of Culture since 1969.

== History ==
The castle was attacked many times during the Hundred Years' War and in the 15th century was burned by the troops of the Lords of Bourdeille. The current castle is the result of two successive periods of re-construction, the first in 1766 under direction of the architect Chauvin and the second, at the end of the 19th century, is the work of the architect Léon Drouyn. The chapel which dates from this second phase houses the pectoral cross and chalice of the former abbot of Chancelade, Alain de Solminihac.

== Gallery ==
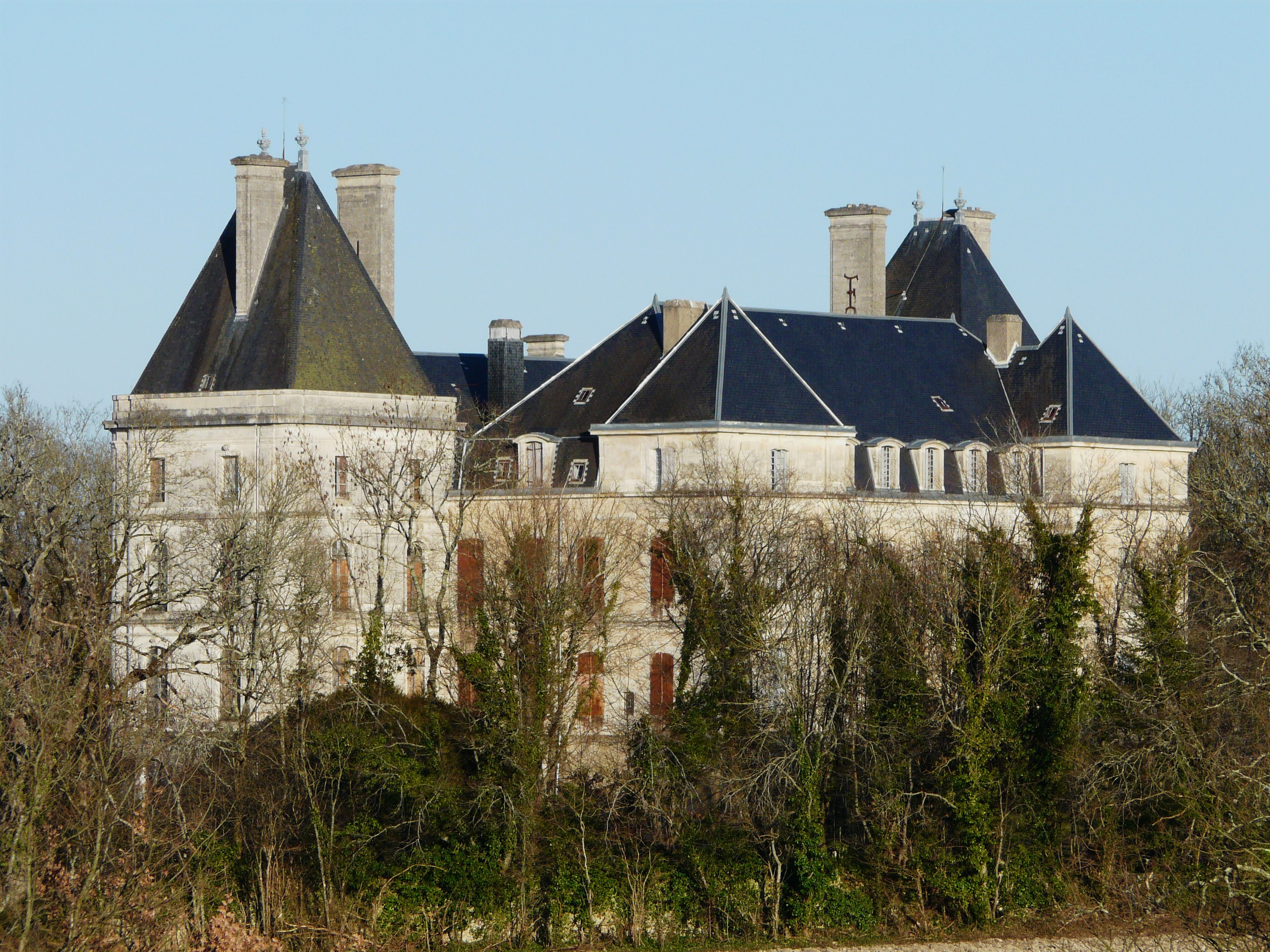
The château

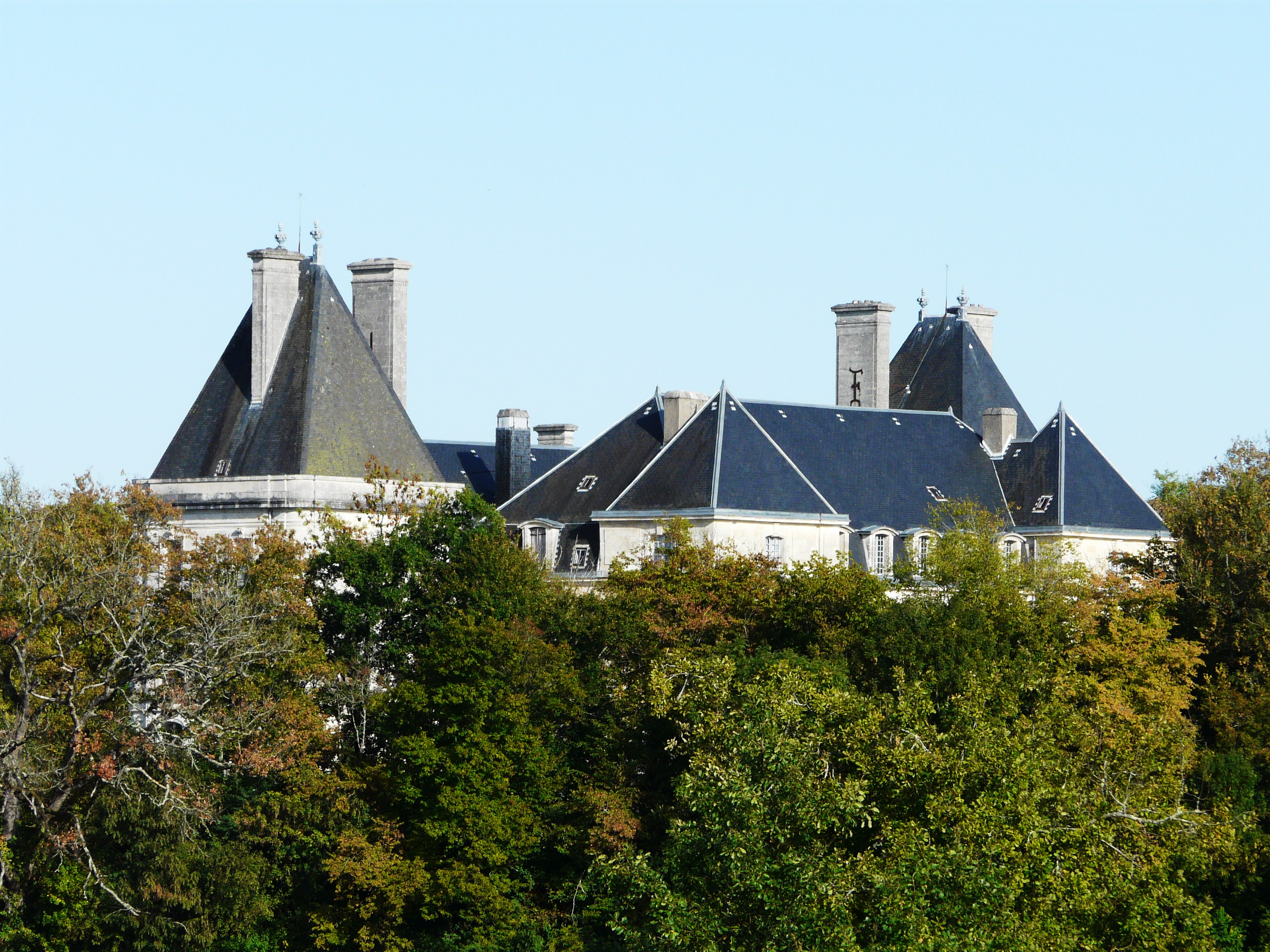
The château from a distance

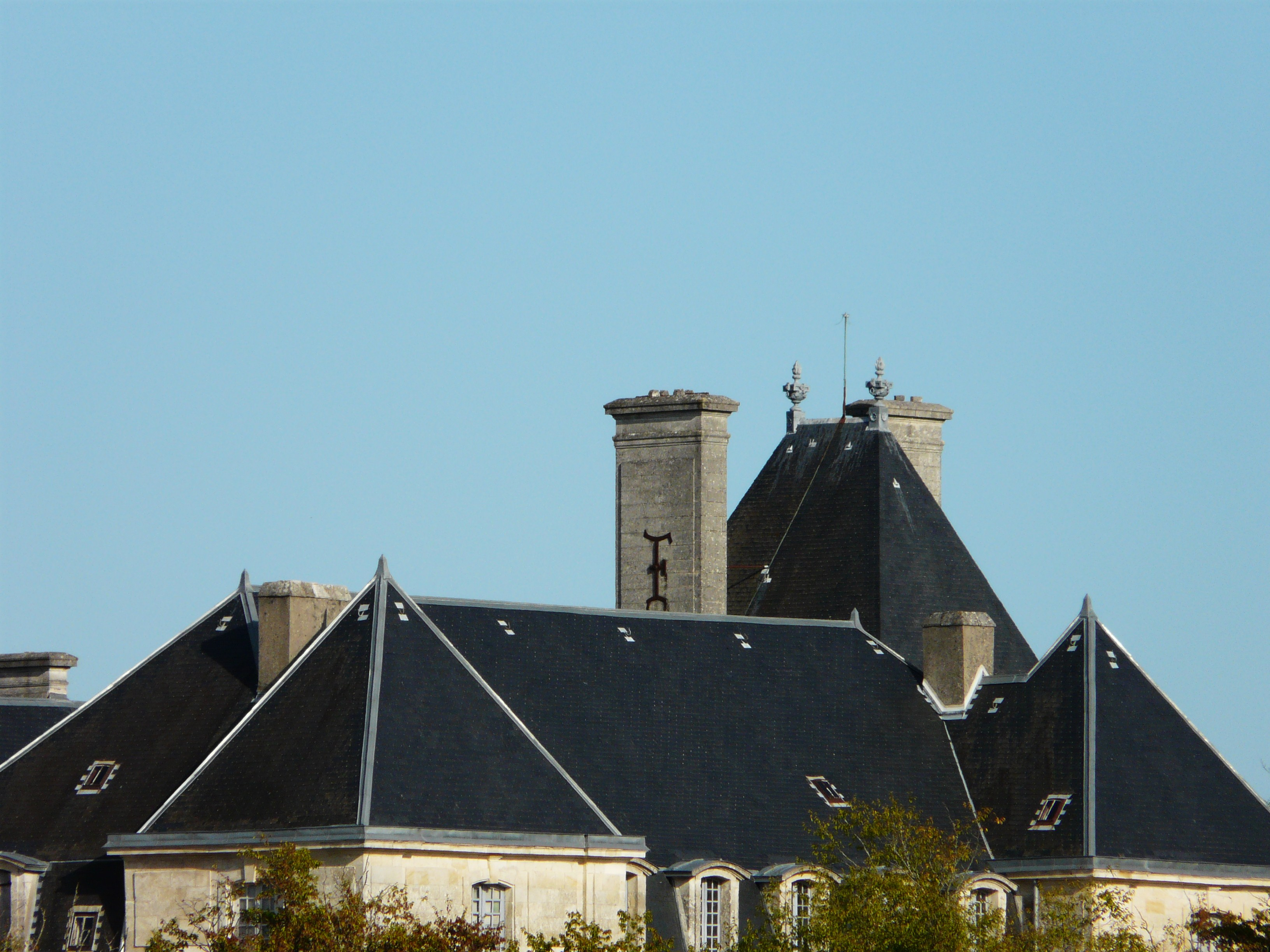
The roof of the château

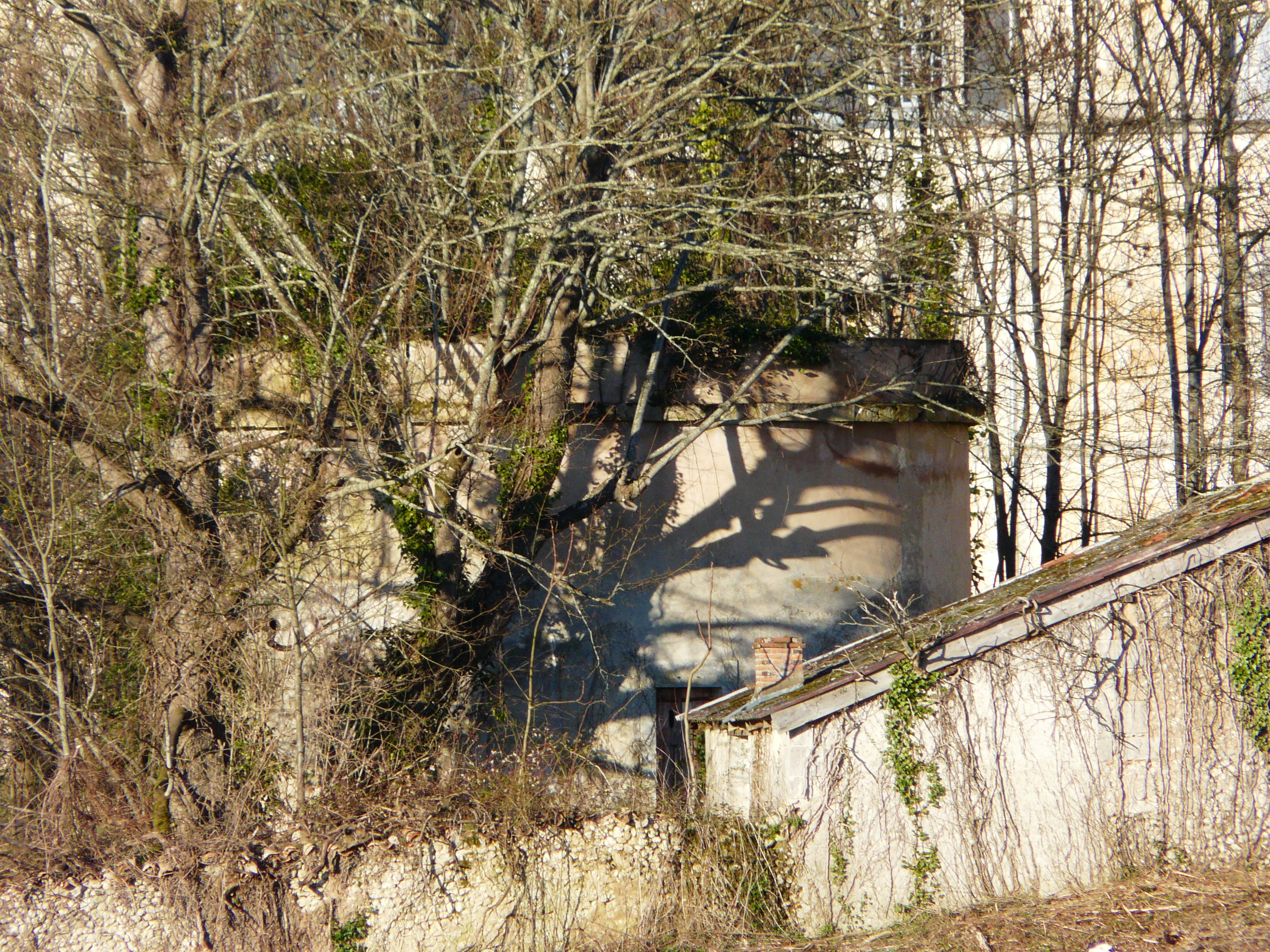
The dovecote in winter
