= Château de la Faye (Saint-Sulpice-de-Mareuil) =

Castle in France

Coordinates: 45.7391°N 3.6516°E

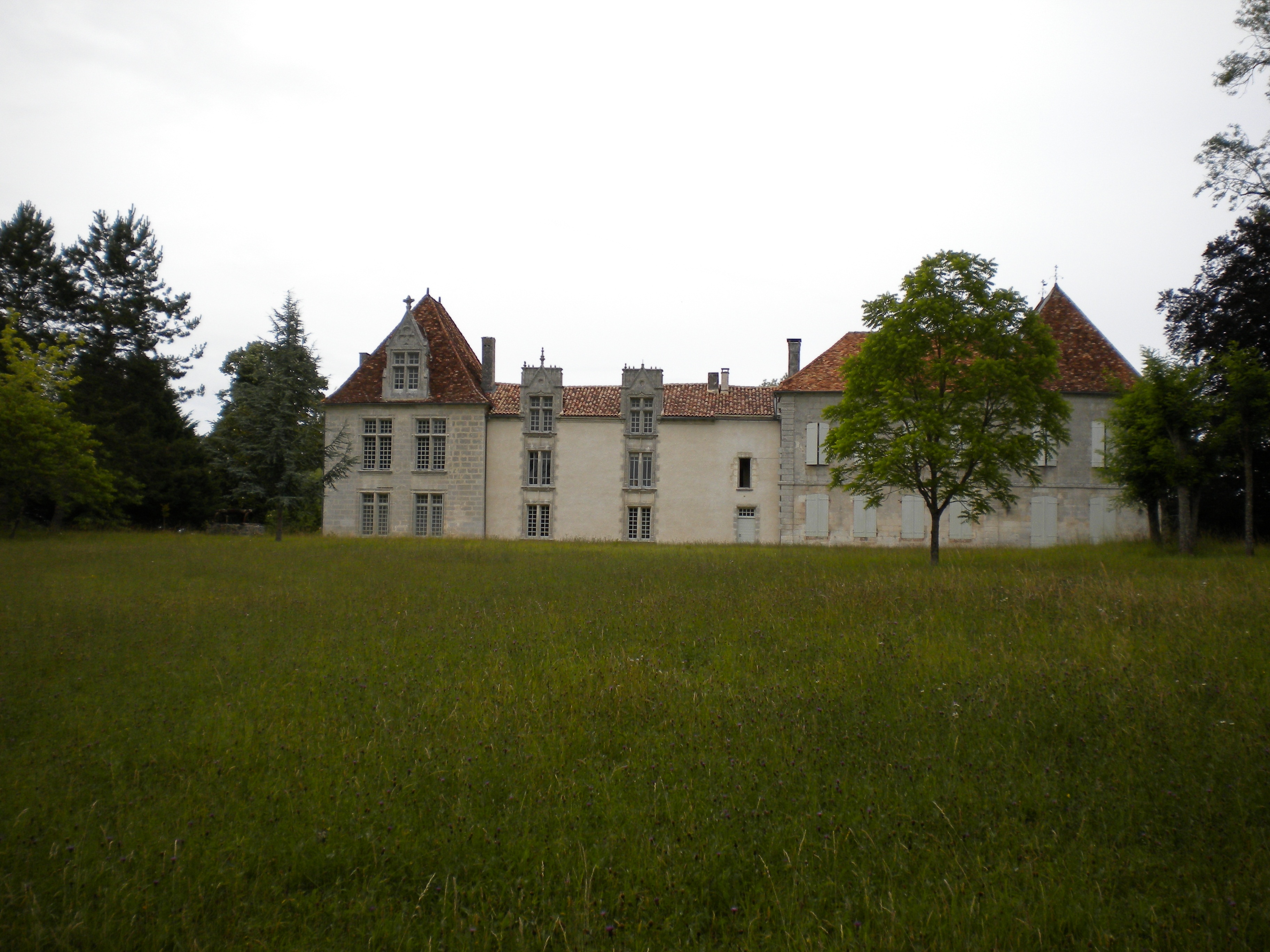
Château de la Faye

The Château de la Faye in Saint-Sulpice-de-Mareuil, France, is an 18th-century French château built by the enlargement of a 16th-century structure, in Saint-Sulpice-de-Mareuil in the Dordogne département, France.
