= Château de la Faye (Villexavier) =

Manor house in Charente-Maritime, France

Coordinates: 45.3764°N 0.4339°W

The Château de la Faye is a manor house in Villexavier, in the Charente-Maritime region of France.

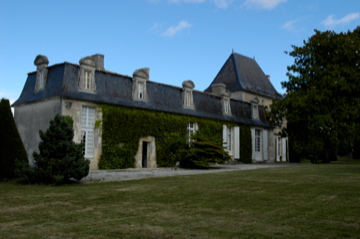
Château de la Faye

The Château belonged to the Guinanson family in the 15th century but was sold in 1683 to Claude-Louis de Saint-Simon-Montbleru. During the revolution, Claude-Anne de Rouvroy, (marquis, and then Duke of Saint-Simon, Maréchal de camp and Deputy of the nobility of the Angoumois) emigrated in 1789 and the Château was sold as national property.

== Architecture ==
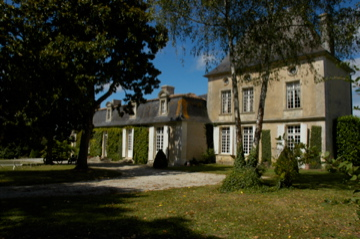
Château de la Faye

The Château was built in 1666 and was partly destroyed in the 19th century, today only the former right wing remains.

The logis is short with attics and a Gabled roof including high dormer volutes and semi-circular pediment above the roof Gables. The roof is covered with slate tiles.

The Castle was included in the registry of historic monuments on February 26, 2010.
