= Fossiliferous limestone =

Limestone containing fossils

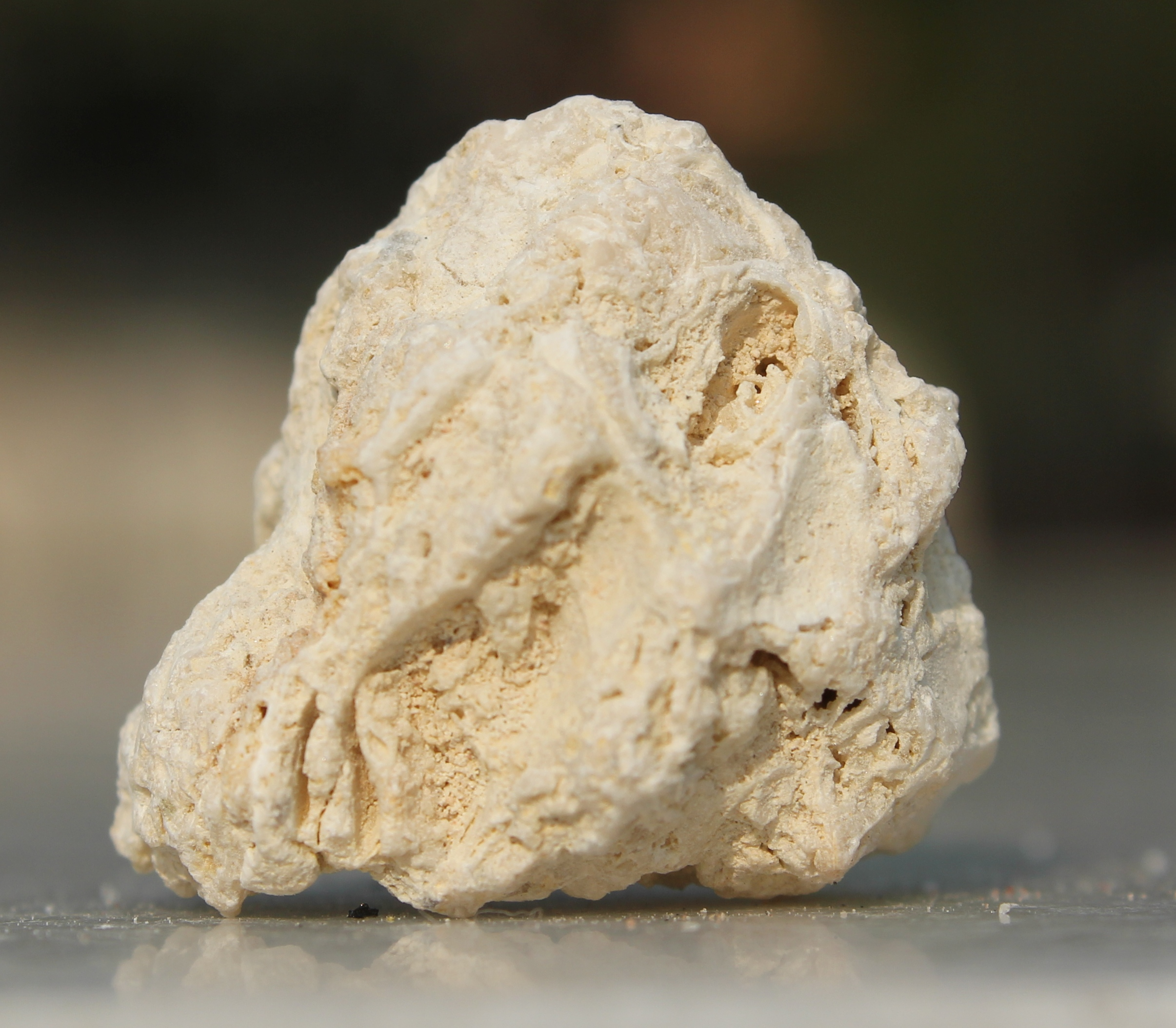
Sample of fossiliferous limestone

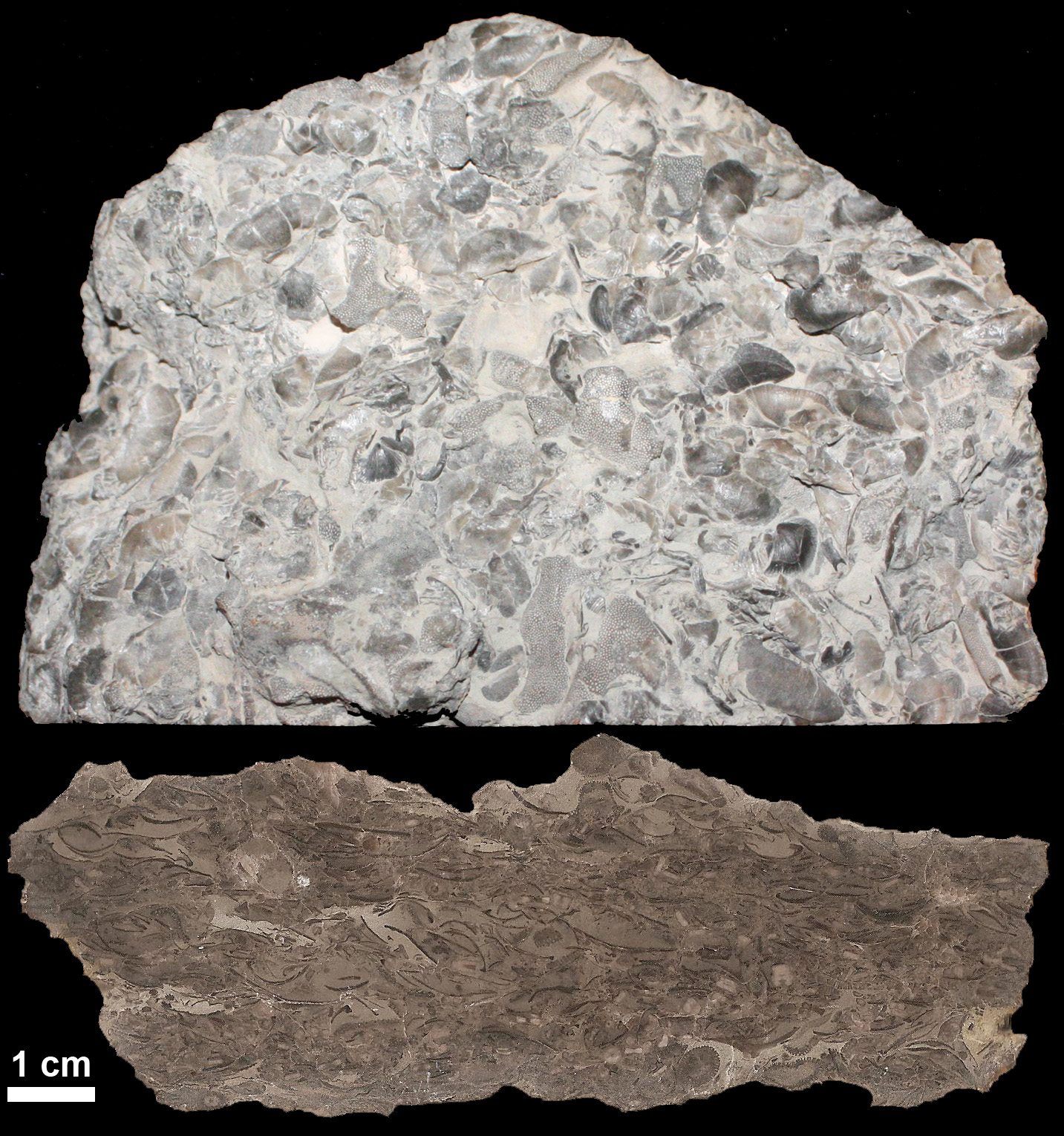
Examples of small fossils in limestone

Fossiliferous limestone is a type of limestone that contains noticeable quantities of fossils or fossil traces. If a particular type of fossil dominates, a more specialized term can be used as in "Crinoidal", "Coralline", "Conchoidal" limestone. If seashells, shell fragments, and shell sand form a significant part of the rock, a term "shell limestone" is used.

The fossils in these rocks may be of macroscopic or microscopic size. The sort of macroscopic fossils often include crinoid stems, brachiopods, gastropods, and other hard shelled mollusk remains.

In some cases, microfossils such as siliceous diatom shells in deposition may convert over time to opal and chert, providing the only inferred evidence of bioactivity preserved in limestone.

Fossiliferous limestone is termed biosparite under the Folk classification of sedimentary rocks.

Lagerstätte are a class of fossil bearing rocks that includes fossiliferous limestone.

== Use ==
Fossils in general provide geologic clues to the environment of deposition, rock formation, and the types of biological activities present at the time. Index fossils are more helpful in providing geologic references or reference markers.

When polished as tiles or slabs, fossil bearing rocks are used as attractive building facades and pavements. They are also carved as ornamental stones, and used in jewelry making.

== Common rock types ==
- Carboniferous limestone
- Coquina
- Coral rag
- Coral sand
- Fossil beach
- Keystone
- Shelly limestone

== Less fossil bearing types ==
- Lithographic limestone
- Marl
- Millstone
- Plattenkalk
- Tufa

== Geological layers ==
- Alum Bluff Formation
- Angoumian
- Arenig
- Bioclast
- Biostratigraphy
- Blue Lias
- Carnian
- Chalk Group
- Ediacara biota
- Elk Point Group
- Eramosa
- Galena Group
- Hirnantian
- La Tour-Blanche Anticline
- Mannville Group
- Madison Group
- Mareuil Anticline
- Marcellus Formation
- Morrison Formation
- Orsten
- Ostracod Beds
- Redknife Formation
- Red River Formation
- Rock-cut basin
- Stoddart Group
- Tithonian
- Wenlock Group
- White Limestone Formation

== Locations on Earth ==
- Alquézar
- Aquitaine Basin
- Aymestry Limestone
- Barstow Formation
- Bear Gulch Limestone
- Bennett Island
- Bissett Formation
- Bladen Nature Reserve
- Bluegrass Region
- Boodjamulla National Park
- Borschiv
- Bullock Creek
- Bunda Cliffs
- Bungonia State Recreation Area
- Caves of the Tullybrack and Belmore hills
- Cedar Mountain Formation
- Chazy Formation
- Chestnut Ridge, Bedford County
- Chocolate Hills
- Colemans Quarry
- Columbus Limestone
- Coniston Limestone
- Coon Creek Formation
- Cowan Lake (Ohio)
- Crab Island (Lake Champlain)
- Cradle of Humankind
- Crato Formation
- Cumnor Hurst
- Cunswick Scar
- Dinosaur Valley State Park
- Durupınar site
- Dudley Tunnel
- East Kirkton Quarry
- Elliot Formation
- English Riviera Geopark
- Falls of the Ohio State Park
- Front Range
- Gem Valley
- Geology of Australia
- Geology of the Canyonlands area
- Geology of the Capitol Reef area
- Geology of the Dallas–Fort Worth Metroplex
- Geology of Ethiopia
- Geology of the Grand Canyon area
- Geology of the Grand Teton area
- Geology of the Iberian Peninsula
- Geology of Nepal
- Geology of the Pyrenees
- Geology of Somerset
- Geology of the Zion and Kolob canyons area
- Gilwern Hill, Powys
- Glen Rose Formation
- Gurney Slade quarry
- Haile Quarry site
- Halecombe
- Hamilton Group
- Hawkesbury Quarry
- Hessilhead Limestone
- Hill Country State Natural Area
- Hotavlje
- House Range
- Humpback Rock
- Hunstanton
- Indiana Limestone
- Isle La Motte, Vermont
- Ixkun
- John Boyd Thacher State Park
- Kaibab Limestone
- Kakanui
- Kennetcook River
- Keyser Formation
- Kotelny Island
- Latyan Dam
- Lincolnshire limestone
- Llandovery Group
- Madar, Yemen
- Majlis al Jinn
- Michigan Basin
- Middridge Quarry
- Mooreville Chalk Formation
- Mortimer Forest
- Mugarra
- Naracoorte Caves National Park
- Neckar
- Notch Peak
- Nullarbor Plain
- Old Rag Mountain
- Onondaga Formation
- Ottawa Valley
- Owl's Hill Nature Center
- Öland
- Palm Islands Nature Reserve
- Paluxy River
- Penmon
- Perth Basin
- Pipe Creek Sinkhole
- Purbeck Limestone Formation
- Riversleigh
- Rock Point Provincial Park
- Sacul, El Petén
- St. Louis Limestone
- Santana Formation
- Solnhofen Plattenkalk
- Somervell County, Texas
- Stephen Formation
- Suwannee Limestone
- Swartkrans
- Tamiami Formation
- Taynton Limestone Formation
- Tennessee marble
- Torreya Formation
- Tyndall Limestone
- Upper Elliot Formation
- Walcott-Rust quarry
- Warrior Formation
- Washtenaw Community College
- Weardale
- Wetterstein limestone
- Wills Creek Formation
- Wren's Nest
- Zhoukoudian
- Zitai Formation

== See also ==
- List of types of limestone
- Muschelkalk

== Sources ==
- Mysore State Department of Mines and Geology (1920). Records, Vol. XVII-1918, Part II. Bangalore: Gevernment Press.
