= Anticlinal =

Anticlinal may refer to:

- Anticline, in structural geology, an anticline is a fold that is convex up and has its oldest beds at its core
- Anticlinal, in stereochemistry, a torsion angle between 90° to 150°, and –90° to –150°; see Alkane_stereochemistry
- Anticlinal division (botany)

== See also ==
- Weald–Artois Anticline
- Mareuil Anticline
- La Tour-Blanche Anticline
- Usk Anticline
- Fold (geology)
- Detachment fold
- Stereochemistry
