= La Tour-Blanche Anticline =

Geological structure in southwestern France

Coordinates: 45°21′N 0°28′E

The La Tour-Blanche Anticline, also called Chapdeuil Anticline or Chapdeuil-La Tour-Blanche Anticline, is a tectonically caused, dome-like upwarp in the sedimentary succession of the northeastern Aquitaine Basin in France. The structure is oriented west-northwest-east-southeast.

== Description of the structure ==
The anticline was named after La Tour-Blanche, a small town in the northwestern Dordogne. Yet the centre of the structure is situated farther southeast within the commune of Chapdeuil, hence the names Chapdeuil Anticline or Chapdeuil-La Tour-Blanche Anticline. In plan view the structure has the shape of a nearly rectangular parallelogram with the base lines striking ESE-WNW (N 120) and the sides more or less N-S (reference horizon being the Ligérian/Angoumian boundary). In its long dimension, the anticline measures about 6 km, yet across strike merely 3 km. Similar in shape to the Mareuil Anticline, the La Tour-Blanche Anticline has an asymmetric profile with a steeper northeastern flank (dipping 20° to the NNE) and a very gentle southwestern flank (dipping 5° to the SSW). The northeastern flank is accompanied by a reverse fault with very little heave (10–15 m).

On its northern side, the La Tour-Blanche Anticline yields to the Villebois-Lavalette-La Chapelle-Montabourlet Syncline (also called Gout-Rossignol-Léguillac Syncline). After a pronounced structural flexure, traceable from Verteillac to Grand-Brassac, follows to the south another syncline (northeast of Ribérac) entirely composed of Campanian strata at the surface. The next anticlinal high traverses Montmoreau in the Charente department and ends just northwest of Ribérac.

The eastern end of the La Tour-Blanche Anticline is crossed by several normal faults trending mainly NE-SW. East of Saint-Just the axis of the anticline slowly disappears simultaneously changing its direction to an easterly course. The structure then definitely ends on the east side of the Boulou (near Paussac).

The area of the anticline is drained in a southeasterly direction by the Euche river, a right-hand tributary of the Dronne, and by the Buffebale, a small rivulet and left-hand tributary of the Euche. It demonstrates inverted topography, i.e. the core of the structure is a depression.

== Regional extent ==
Seen from the edge of the Aquitaine Basin, the La Tour-Blanche Anticline forms the second anticlinal ridge. At a distance of 25 km, it runs more or less parallel to the edge of the Massif Central. In the centre of the anticline, the sedimentary cover already reaches a thickness of 1000 m.

Like the Mareuil Anticline, the La Tour-Blanche Anticline is a regional feature and can be traced northwestwards to Cognac in the Charente department. To the southeast, the structure links up via the Bussac high with the Périgueux anticline (Beauronne valley); it then continues in the Saint-Cyprien Anticline (an upfaulted anticline) and finally reaches Cahors in the Lot department via the Cazals flexure.

== Stratigraphy ==
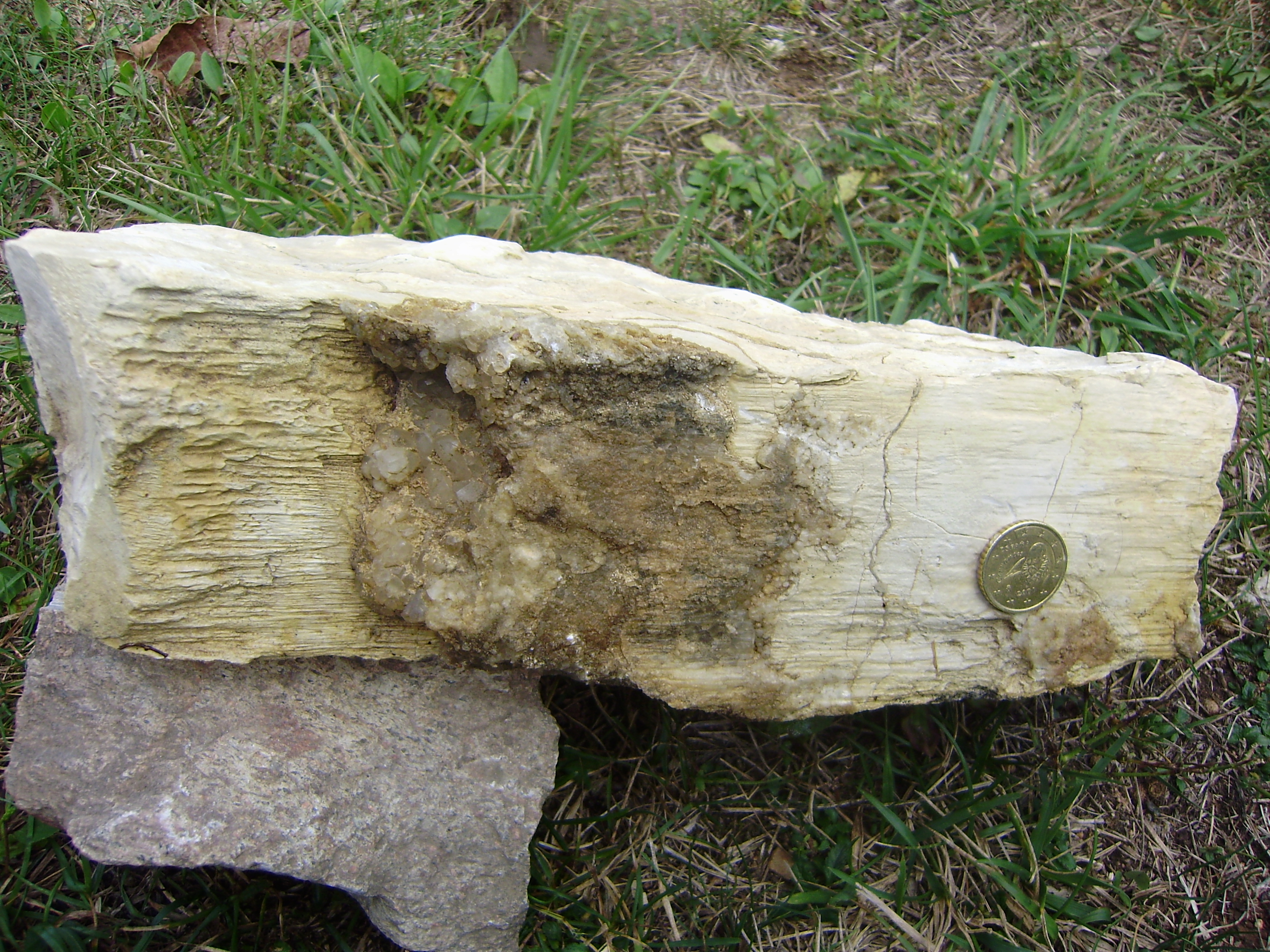
Lower Portlandian micrite from the La Tour-Blanche Anticline. The rock is strike-slip-faulted in an ESE-WNW-direction and shows a calcite-filled pull-apart.

The La Tour-Blanche anticline is cored by Upper Jurassic. Lowest outcropping member is uppermost Kimmeridgian overlain by Lower Portlandian. The Uppermost Kimmeridgian is being cut by the Buffebale and can be observed in the slopes of the rivulet. It has a detrital (sandy) base and then changes into calcareous sandstones and finally into bioclastic, oolithic limestones. Two facies domains can be distinguished: a detrital domain in the east (Serie de la Marteille) and a reefal domain with single corals, occasional oysters and nerineids in the west (Serie de Cercles). This differentiation into two facies domains also persists through the Lower Portlandian, with the eastern domain showing detrital intercalations made of shelly debris, gravels, and breccias. The Lower Portlandian — generally composed of 35 m of well-bedded cryptocrystalline micrites — takes up the major part of the anticline. Its grey to yellowish, sometimes reddish beds are between 10 and 20 cm thick and are separated by thin marly or clayey layers.

After the regression in the Uppermost Jurassic and the complete withdrawal during the entire Lower Cretaceous, the sea transgressed again during the Cenomanian. The usually fairly thin, littoral Cenomanian deposits are very variable in thickness and can reach 40 m in certain places. They can be divided into three sequences: a detrital sequence at the base (sands with shelly debris and lignite intercalations) followed by a calcareous sequence (reddish-brownish to greyish limestones) and another detrital sequence at the top (greyish-blackish to greenish claystones that are very rich in oysters). Concordantly on top of the Cenomanian follow the Turonian deposits which can be subdivided into 15–40 m of Ligérian (chalky, nodular limestones) and 35–65 m of Angoumian (rudist limestones). The overlying Coniacian is slightly discordant. It consists of hard fossiliferous limestones reaching a thickness of 50–80 m. The sedimentary sequence is topped by the typical chalks of the Santonian (60–80 m) and the Campanian (100–180 m); it can reach all in all a total thickness of 535 m.

The deeper parts of the La Tour-Blanche Anticline have been studied by drilling, reaching the variscan basement (dark grey metamorphic schists) at 1085 m depth. From top to bottom, there is a very thick Upper Jurassic (670 m) followed by 158 m of Middle Jurassic, 182 m of Lias, and 75 m of Triassic.

== Structural observations ==
The tectonic deformations registered by the sediments in the La Tour-Blanche Anticline find their expression in many structural features. Especially the Lower Portlandian was quite strongly deformed and exhibits many stylolites and slickolites. The following structures can be recognized:

- strike-slip faults trending ESE-WNW (N 115) with pronounced slickolites.
- fractures oriented NNE-SSW (N 020) with a right-lateral offset and stylolites pointing in the same direction.
- tension gashes filled with calcite trending mainly N 165 to N 175, sometimes also N 020. They can be interpreted as pull-aparts along releasing bends of the strike-slip faults.
- NW-SE trending fractures (N 130 to N 140) with stylolites pointing in the same direction.

The (most likely) polycyclic movements in the anticline clearly were not just due to compression, but were also caused by shearing (transpression or transtension).

All these observations invoke a shear zone underlying the anticline, probably with a dextral sense of shear.

== Time frame ==
The compressional shortening affecting the sedimentary cover clearly must have happened after the deposition of the Campanian strata. The genesis of the anticlinal ridges in the northern Aquitaine Basin is generally attributed to an endcampanian-maastrichtian phase at the end of the Cretaceous. Certainly the pyrenean orogeny with its strong north–south compression must have had an influence in the shaping of the structures. The main deformation in the Pyrenees happened during the Eocene (Ypresian to Lutetian), peaking during the Lutetian.

== Conclusions ==
The La Tour-Blanche Anticline forms part of a system of anticlinal ridges in the northeastern Aquitaine Basin. During the time interval Uppermost Cretaceous till Eocene compressional movements coupled with considerable shearing motions were responsible in their genesis. Important to note is the rather regular spatial organisation of these structures, which extend ESE-WNW or SE-NW and follow in a dekakilometric spacing (15–20 km) the outline of the Massif Central.

The southern Armorican Massif shows a rather similar spatial organisation in the eastern Vendée; here dextral shear zones in dekakilometric spacing and the intervening far less deformed synclinoria follow the same trend. It therefore can be assumed that the variscan spatial organisation of the southern Armorican Massif also continued into the northern Aquitaine shelf.

Furthermore, this seems to imply that the same or very similar deformation patterns continued right into the Cenozoic. The fractures/shear zones affecting the variscan basement must have been reactivated and consequently left their imprint on the overlying Mesozoic sedimentary cover.
