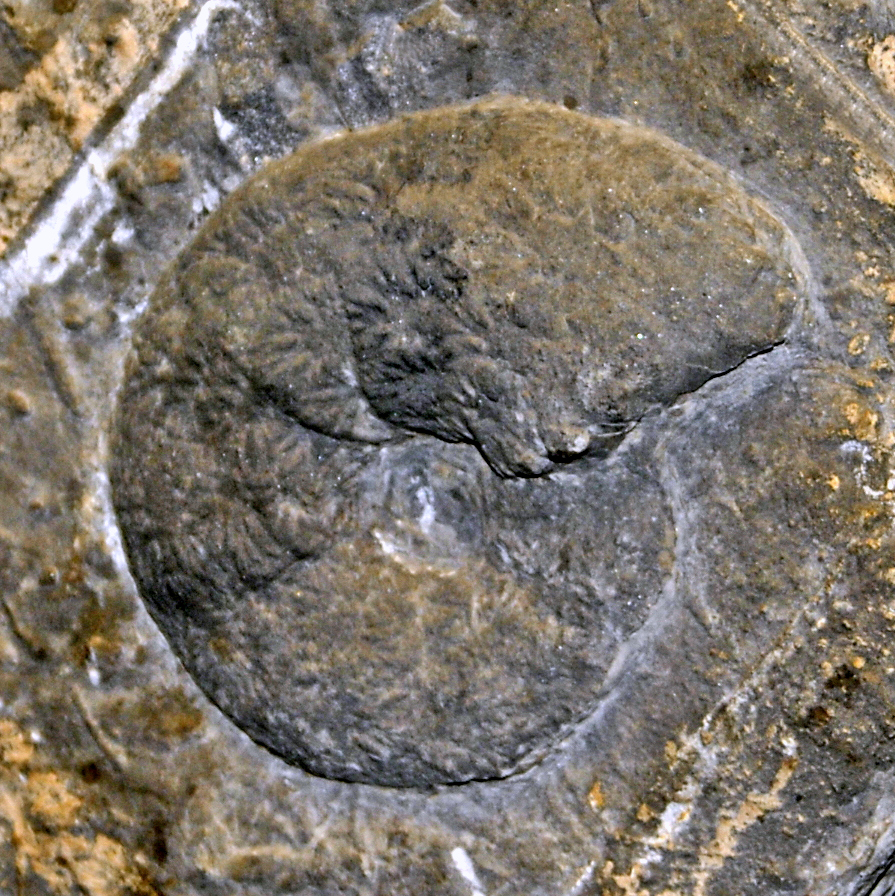
- Eupachydiscus isculensis from Cretaceous – Bergamo (Italy)

Scientific classification
- Kingdom: Animalia
- Phylum: Mollusca
- Class: Cephalopoda
- Subclass: †Ammonoidea
- Order: †Ammonitida
- Family: †Pachydiscidae
- Genus: †Eupachydiscus
- Species: †E. isculensis

Binomial name
- †Eupachydiscus isculensis Redtenbacher 1873

= Eupachydiscus isculensis =

Eupachydiscus isculensis Temporal range: 85.8–70.6 Ma Cretaceous

Extinct species of ammonite

Eupachydisus isculensis is a Pachydiscid ammonite species from the Upper Cretaceous marine strata of France, Spain and Italy.
