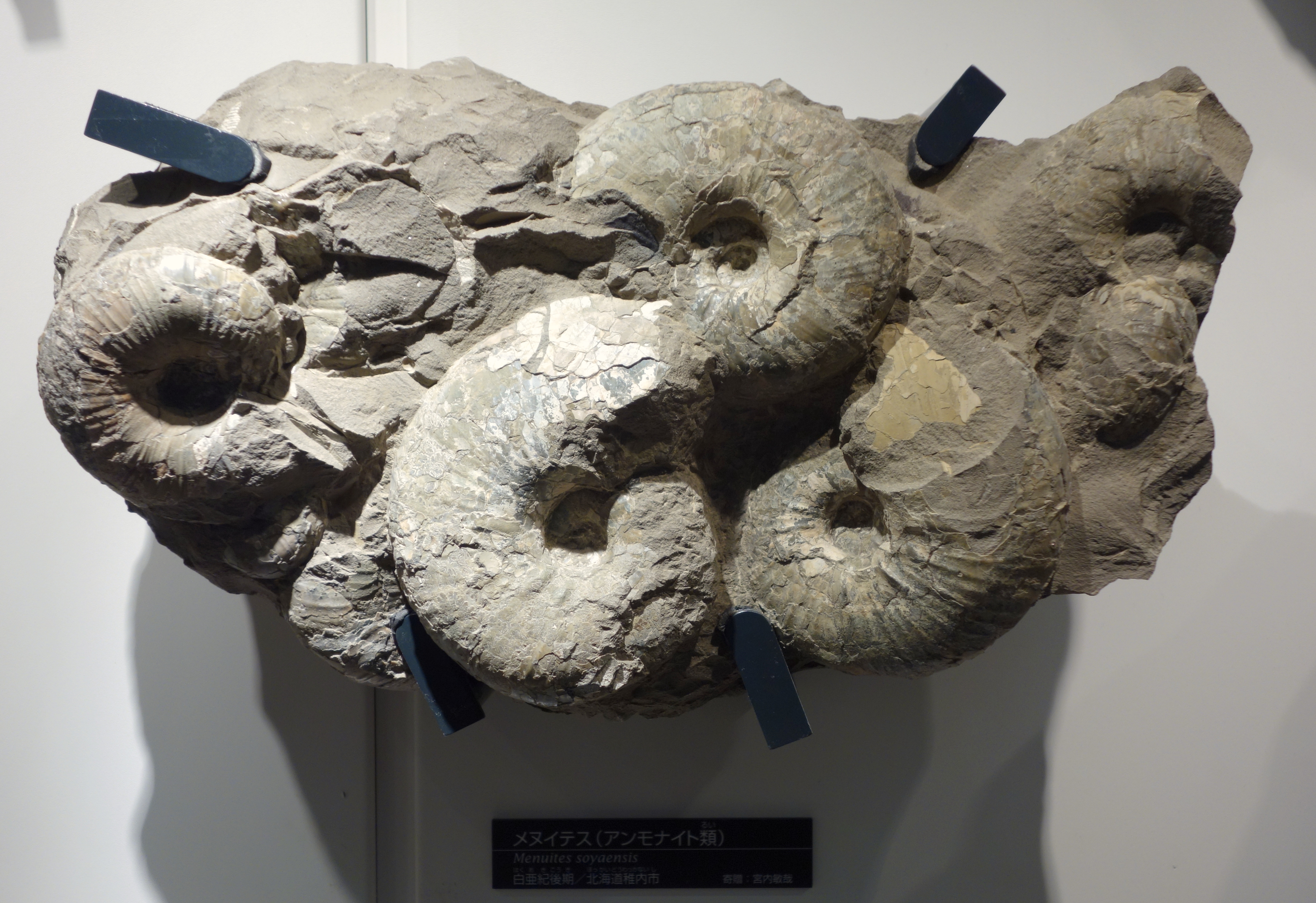
- Menuites soyaensis

Scientific classification
- Kingdom: Animalia
- Phylum: Mollusca
- Class: Cephalopoda
- Subclass: †Ammonoidea
- Order: †Ammonitida
- Family: †Pachydiscidae
- Genus: †Menuites; Spath, 1922

= Menuites =

Menuites Temporal range: Santonian–Campanian

Genus of molluscs (fossil)

Menuites is a genus of extinct ammonites, forming a rather small offshoot of Anapachydiscus with a fairly widespread distribution from the Upper Cretaceous Santonian and Campanian stages.

The inner whorls of this pachydiscid have fine, straight or slightly curved, radial, ribs, characteristic of Anapachydiscus. The long body, or living, chamber is with prominent rounded umbilical tubercles and ventrolateral tubercles set on irregular, wide-spaced, rounded ribs.

== Distribution ==
Fossils of Menuites have been found in Angola, Antarctica, Australia, Austria, Chile, France, Germany, India, Iran, Japan, Mexico, the Netherlands, the Russian Federation, South Africa and the United States (Arkansas, Delaware, New Jersey, Wyoming).
