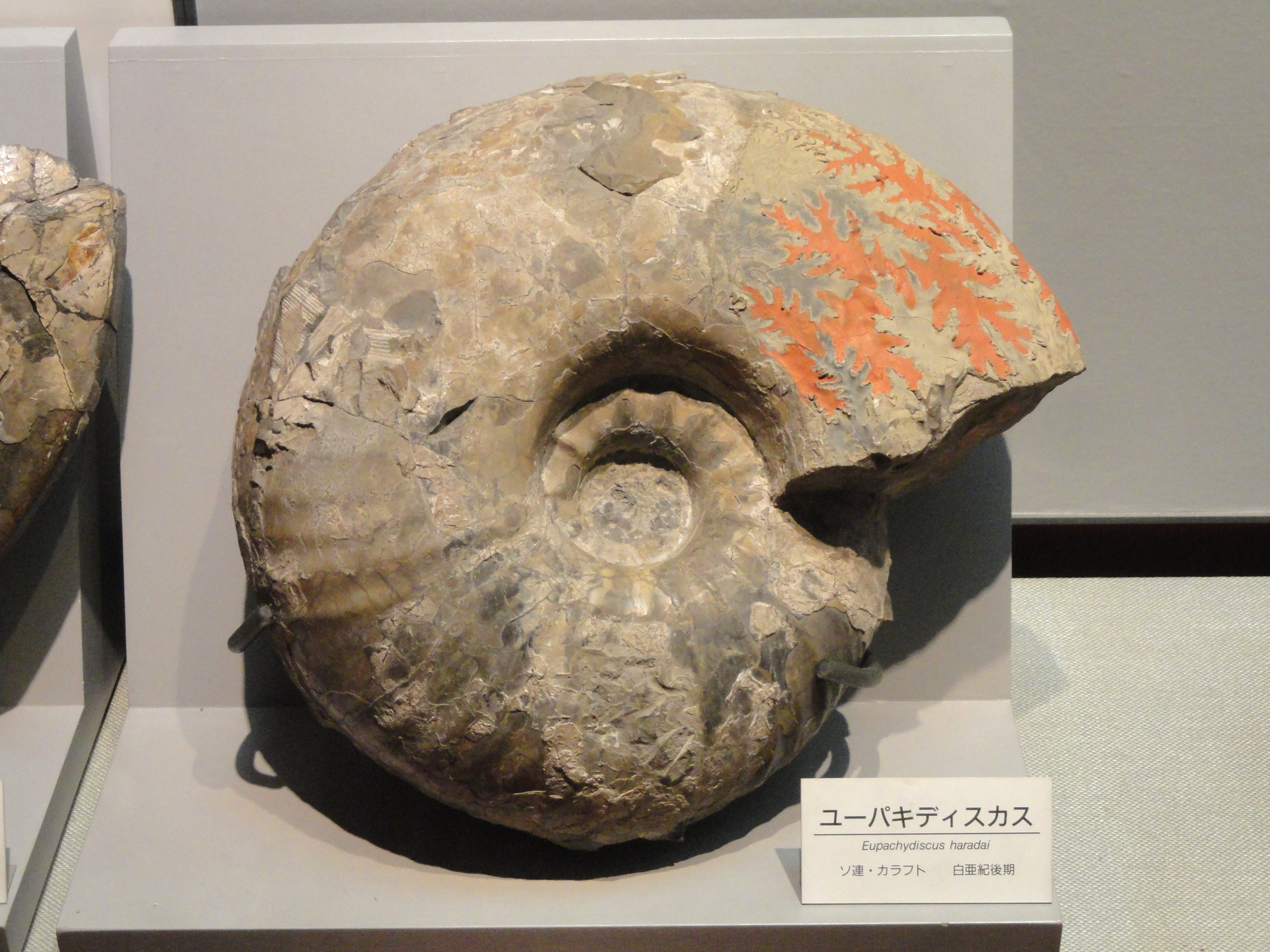
- Eupachydiscus haradai

Scientific classification
- Kingdom: Animalia
- Phylum: Mollusca
- Class: Cephalopoda
- Subclass: †Ammonoidea
- Order: †Ammonitida
- Family: †Pachydiscidae
- Genus: †Eupachydiscus; Spath, 1922

= Eupachydiscus =

Eupachydiscus Temporal range: Cretaceous

Genus of molluscs (fossil)

Eupachydisus is a large, coarse-ribbed Pachydiscid ammonite genus from the Upper Cretaceous, found in Coniacian to Campanian age strata in Europe, Madagascar, Japan, and British Columbia.

The whorl section in Eupachydiscus is inflated and depressed, almost round in the later growth stages. Ribs are narrow but prominent in the early whorls, becoming thick and strong in the later.

Eupachydiscus is distinct from the mostly later, Campanian - Maastrichtian, compressed and high-whorled Pachydiscus, but somewhat similar to the coeval, inflated and coarse ribbed, Coniacian-Santonian, Pachydiscoides.

== Species ==
- Eupachydiscus isculensis † Redtenbacher 1873
- Eupachydiscus macoveii † Szaisz 1981
- Eupachydiscus pseudogrossouvrei † Collignon 1955
