= Chimbuites =

Chimbuites Temporal range: Cenomanian

Scientific classification
- Kingdom: Animalia
- Phylum: Mollusca
- Class: Cephalopoda
- Subclass: †Ammonoidea
- Order: †Ammonitida
- Family: †Pachydiscidae
- Genus: †Chimbuites; Casey & Glaessner, 1958

Type species
- Chimbuites sinuosocostatus Casey & Glaessner, 1958

Species
- C. giganteus Matsumuto & Swarko, 1993; C. mirindowensis Wright, 1963

Chimbuites is an extinct genus of large Pachydiscid ammonites from the Cretaceous period of Papua New Guinea and Northern Australia.

== Taxonomic history ==
The type species, C. sinuosocostatus, was originally described in 1958 from the Albian stage near the Chimbu airstrip in the Eastern Highlands of Papua New Guinea, within the Chim Formation, placed in the family Hoplitidae. C. mirindowensis was described in 1963 from the Upper Cenomanian stage around Mirindow and Mirialampi Points, Pouplimadourie, and Moonkinu on Bathurst Island; a species possibly equivalent to it was later also found in the Ieru Formation of Papua New Guinea in 1991. With the description of C. giganteus from the Middle Cenomanian of the Kerabi Formation in 1993, the genus is now considered to be in the family Pachydiscidae, with all species likely being from the same period.
