= Mareuil Anticline =

Coordinates: 45°28′N 0°25′E

The Mareuil Anticline, also called Mareuil-Meyssac Anticline, is a structural high within the sedimentary sequence of the northeastern Aquitaine Basin. The northwest-southeast trending anticline was caused by tectonic movements probably starting in the Upper Cretaceous.

== Description of the structure ==
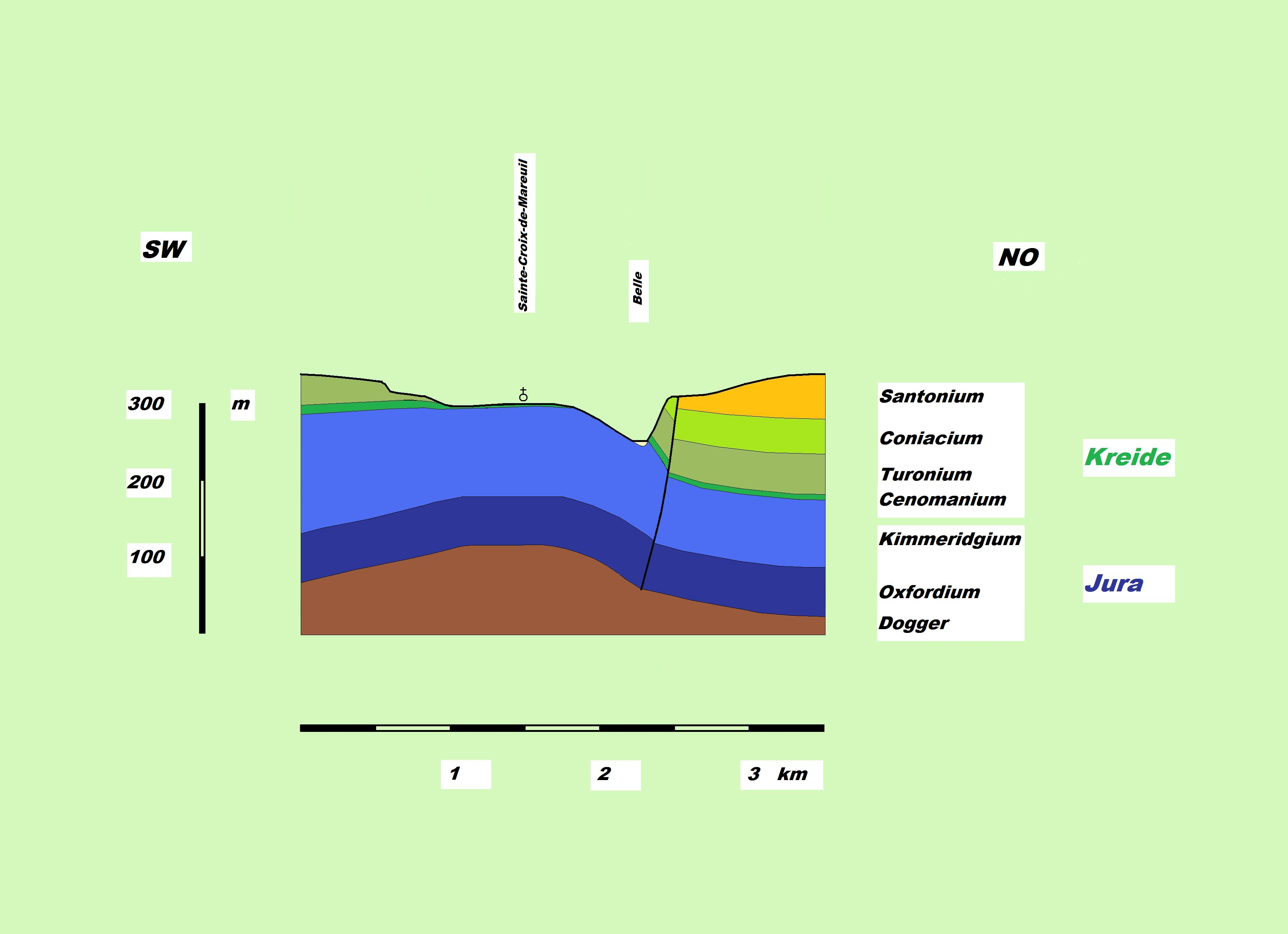
A cross-section through the Mareuil Anticline with vertical exaggeration

The anticline was named after Mareuil, a small town in the northwestern Dordogne, France. The centre of the structure is near Sainte-Croix-de-Mareuil, somewhat farther to the northwest. In plan view the anticline has the shape of an elongated pear with its long axis aligned NW-SE and reaching about 5 km in length (the Cenomanian/Turonian boundary serving as a reference horizon). The short axis is only 2 km in length. The structure is doubly asymmetric, with steeper dipping northeastern and northwestern limbs. It is accompanied on its northeastern side by the Mareuil Fault, which starts at La Rochebeaucourt and continues to the north of Brantôme. Along this fault the northeastern side of the anticline was pushed up by about 30 m.

On the southeastern side of the anticline, there are several smaller cross-cutting faults locally disturbing the angle of dip. These cross faults are all following Riedel directions, either the R- or the R'-position, hinting at an underlying shear zone.

== Regional geology ==
Seen from the edge of the northeastern Aquitaine Basin, the Mareuil Anticline forms the first structural high within the sedimentary cover. It runs more or less parallel with the edge of the Massif Central, at a distance of about 15 km. The sedimentary cover reaches a thickness of altogether 400 m in the anticline. In the syncline on the northeast (the Combiers-Saint-Crépin-de-Richemont Syncline), the sediments are 500 m thick. In the adjoining syncline on the southwestern side (the Gout-Rossignol-Léguillac Syncline), the sediments reach 700 m in thickness. This is followed 8 km to the southwest by another anticlinal ridge, the La Tour-Blanche Anticline. In this second anticlinal ridge, the sediments already show a thickness of 1000 m.

The Mareuil Anticline is a large-scale structure. To the northwest it changes into a fault zone that can be traced from Angoulême to Isle de Yeu. To the southeast it also changes into a fault zone running from Terrasson to Meyssac. It possibly continues into the Lacassagne Fault or even into the Souillac flexure.

== Stratigraphy of the sedimentary sequence ==
In the core of the anticline the top 20 m of Upper Jurassic (Kimmeridgian) strata are exposed — thinly bedded, cryptocrystalline, fossiliferous limestones (micrites). After a long hiatus follow 8–20 m of transgressive Cenomanian consisting of green, glauconitic marls rich in oysters and sandy, alveoline-bearing limestones. The Cenomanian is concordantly overlain by 55–65 m of Turonian strata divided into the nodular, chalky limestones of the Ligérian and the rudist-bearing limestones of the Angoumian. This is followed by 50–65 m of Coniacian — mainly hard, fossiliferous limestones. The sequence finishes with 45–60 m of chalky, glauconitic Santonian, in places rich in oyster debris.

The strata below the 120 m thick Kimmeridgian do not outcrop, but the presence of 210 m of underlying Oxfordian, Bajocian and Bathonian strata is known from drilling results in the vicinity. Whether thin Lias underlies the Dogger cannot be ascertained.

== Age of movements ==
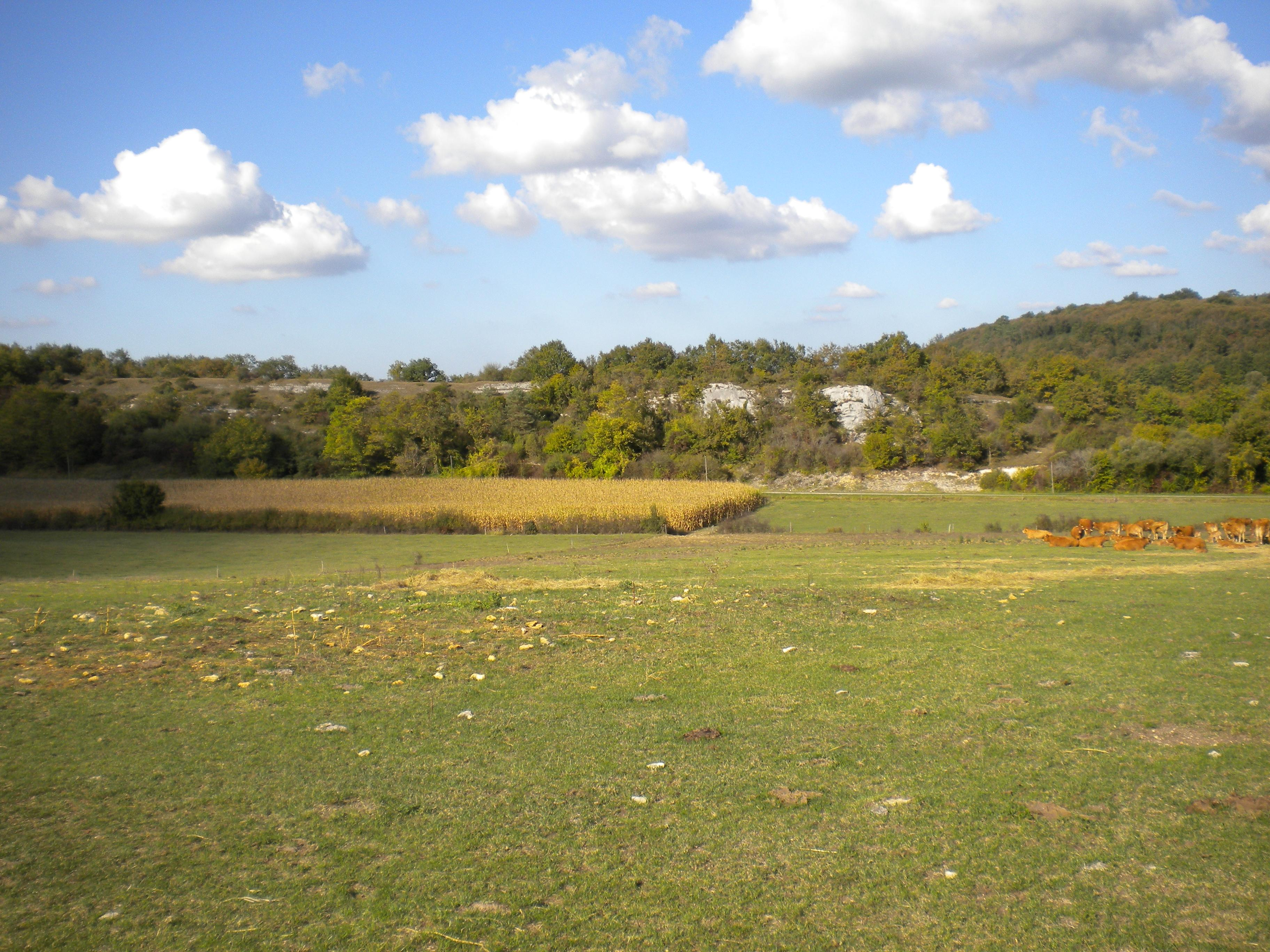
The northwestern edge of the Mareuil Anticline. The Turonian (Angoumian) cliff is dipping 35° to the NNE.

The first movements in the region of the Mareuil Anticline must have occurred in the Lower Cretaceous because of the transgressive nature of the Cenomanian. But these movements were not specific to the anticline; they affected the entire northeastern Aquitaine Basin. Synsedimentary slumps in the Turonian strata near the anticline are a good indicator that the first tectonic stirrings had happened in the anticline. Yet the major event responsible for the creation of the structure clearly must have taken place after the Santonian, because the entire sedimentary sequence has been deformed by it. This major event is thought to have occurred at the end of the Campanian and during the Maastrichtian (end-Campanian-Maastrichtian event). But there is also a good possibility that the main orogenic event during the Eocene/Oligocene in the Pyrenees is somehow involved in the formation of the anticline. Like the Pyrenees, the Mareuil Anticline was created under compressive forces, maybe even under transpression. It is known that compressive forces responsible for the Pyrenean orogeny likewise affected the northeastern edge of the Massif Central (i.e. upthrusts within the Dogger can be seen in the quarry of Saint-Martial-de-Valette).

== Structural observations ==
The Mareuil Anticline forms part of the anticlinal ridges within the northern Aquitaine Basin. These ridges follow a more or less northwesterly-southeasterly direction and run parallel to the South Armorican Shear Zone. Their age of formation is thought to be end-Campanian/Maastrichtian. Possibly they have a transpressive component and share with the South Armorican Shear Zone (SASZ) the same dextral sense of movement. Importantly they have a parallel alignment and a rather uniform spacing of 15–20 km. A local exception in this scheme is the La Tour-Blanche Anticline narrowing to a spacing of 8 km and following a WNW-ESE direction.
