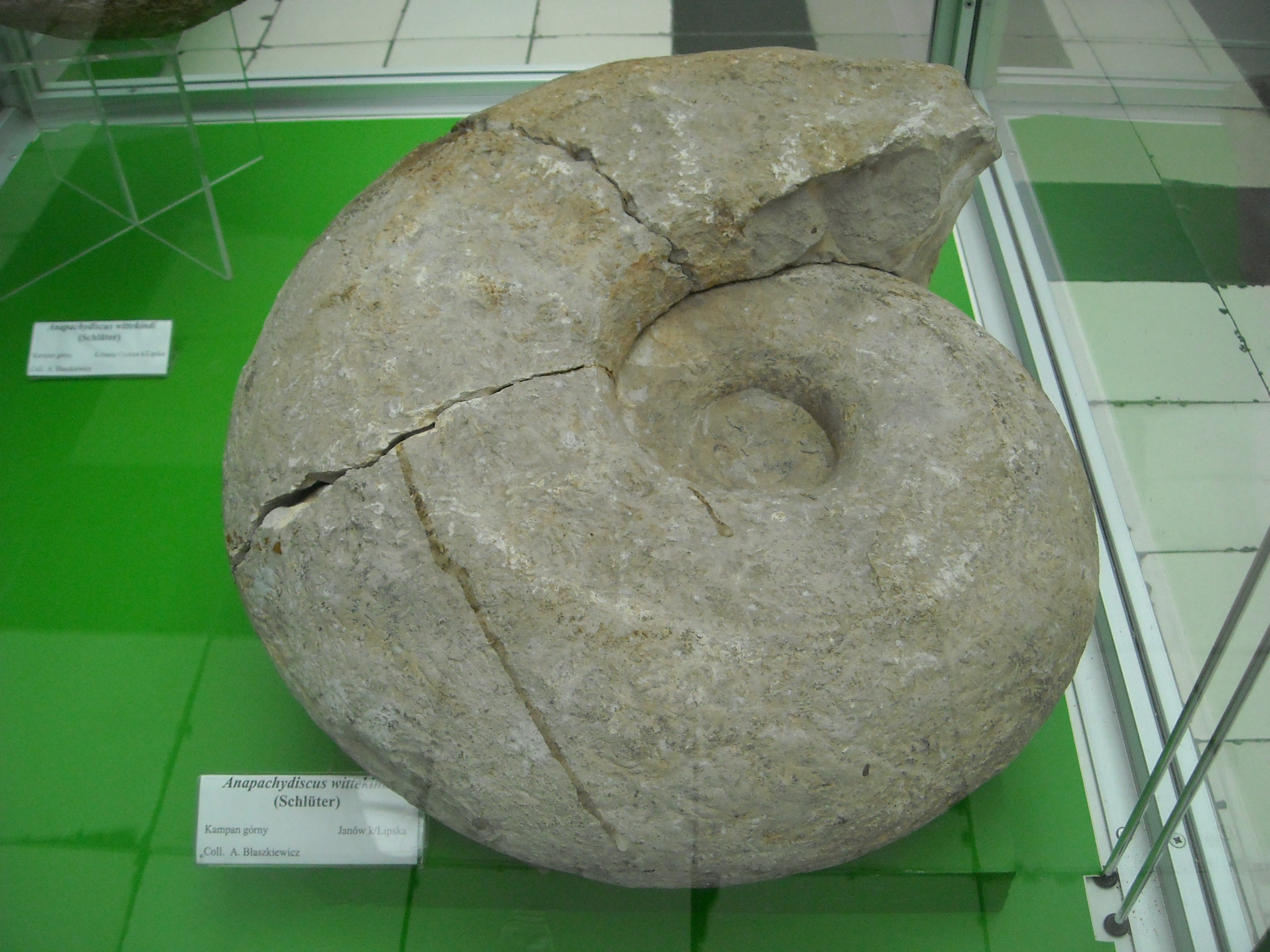
- Anapachydiscus wittekindi

Scientific classification
- Kingdom: Animalia
- Phylum: Mollusca
- Class: Cephalopoda
- Subclass: †Ammonoidea
- Order: †Ammonitida
- Family: †Pachydiscidae
- Genus: †Anapachydiscus; Yabe & Shimizu, 1926

= Anapachydiscus =

Anapachydiscus Temporal range: 85.8–66 Ma

Genus of molluscs (fossil)

Anapachydiscus is an extinct cephalopod genus from the Upper Cretaceous, Santonian - Maastrichtian of Europe, Africa, Madagascar, S.India, N Z, Calif. Mexico, Argentina, and the Antarctic belonging to the ammonoid family Pachydiscidae.

Anapachydiscus has a rather involute shell with a broad to moderately compressed whorl section. Early whorls smooth, intermediary develop straight or slightly curved, radial ribs that thicken toward the umbilicus. Outer whorls may again be smooth, or have coarse ribs so as to resemble Eupachydiscus.
