= Urakawites =

Urakawites Temporal range: Campanian

Scientific classification
- Kingdom: Animalia
- Phylum: Mollusca
- Class: Cephalopoda
- Subclass: †Ammonoidea
- Order: †Ammonitida
- Family: †Pachydiscidae
- Genus: †Urakawites; Matsumoto, 1955

Urakawites is an extinct ammonite from the Upper Cretaceous (Campanian) of Japan, Sakhalin, Russia, British Columbia, Canada and possibly Germany and Angola. Urakawites is placed in the family is Pachydiscidae.

Urakawites is characterized by a bituberculate (meaning it has two rows of tubercles on either side), strongly ribbed, moderately compressed shell.
