= Angoumian =

The Angoumian is a geological group restricted to the northern Aquitaine Basin in France. The group consists of two fossiliferous limestone formations deposited during the Turonian.

== Etymology ==
The name Angoumian, in French Angoumien, is derived from the Angoumois region around the town of Angoulême in the Charente.

== Occurrence ==
The formation crops out in the surroundings of Angoulême, but also reaches farther south into the Dordogne (Périgord, i.e. Périgord Vert & Périgord Blanc).

== Stratigraphy ==
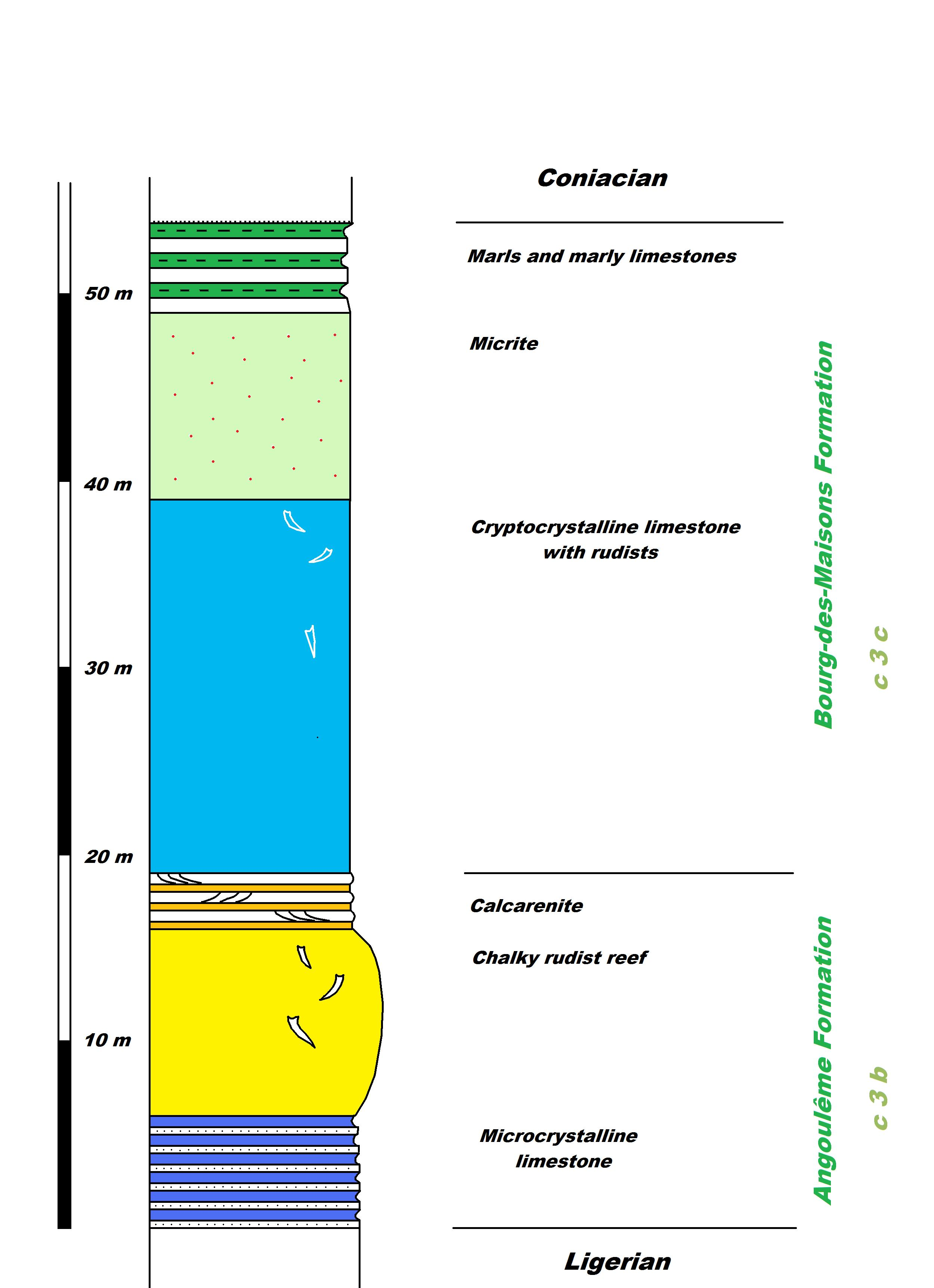
Simplified stratigraphy of the Angoumian

The Angoumian is usually divided into two formations, a lower Angoumien inférieur and an upper Angoumien supérieur. Some authors even attribute the Ligerian (in French Ligérien) to the Angoumian and then call it basal Angoumian. The Angoumian sensu stricto conformably overlies the Ligerian and closes with a hardground towards the overlying Coniacian.

=== Lower Angoumian ===
(Represented on French geological maps as unit c3b)

The 15–20 m thick lower Angoumian, also called Angoulême Formation, starts with a 5–6 m thick, thinly bedded, microcrystalline limestone of white to creamy colour. This limestone is characterised by the incorporation of fine debris and by a benthic microfauna consisting of foraminifera such as miliolida and textulariida. The first rudists (Sphaerulites patera and Biradiolites lumbricalis) start to appear in this level. Some rare cephalopods have also been found (such as Romaniceras deverianum or Lecointriceras fleuriausianum for instance).

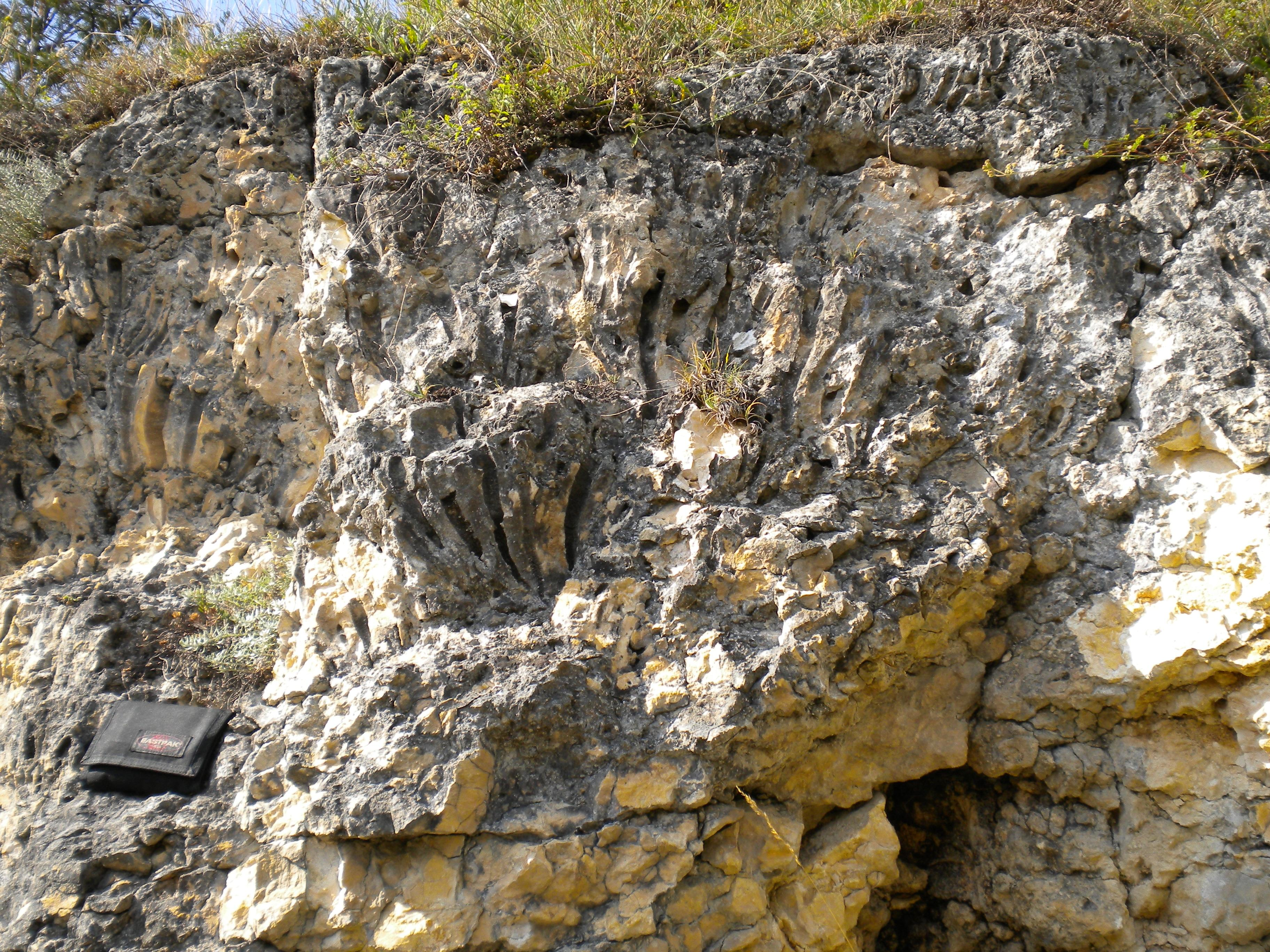
A rudist biostrome in the Angoulême Formation; Aucors quarry near Beaussac, Dordogne

These fairly thin beds then give way to a massive, homogeneous, normally 8–10 m thick, chalky, rudist-bearing limestone of pure white colour. The massive bed stands out geomorphologically, sometimes forming small cliffs in the countryside. Generally this rock is quite soft (it can be cut with a handsaw), it was therefore quarried extensively for building stone with hundreds of small quarries in operation; most of them have closed down by now. The massive member is affected by important thickness variations (its total thickness normally can vary from 5–12 m, sometimes even reaching 15 m), caused either by tectonic disturbances or by post-depositional erosion (for instance, in the Mareuil Anticline, the upper Angoumian discordantly overlies the lower Angoumian, occasionally even cutting down into it). The chalky limestones are mainly composed of rudist debris with comparatively little cement. The rudist debris consists almost exclusively of the species Biradiolites lumbricalis accompanied by minor Durania cornupastoris, Praeradiolites peroni, Radiolites peroni, Radiolites ponsi, Radiolites beaumonti, Radiolites socialis, and Hippurites requieni. In some places, undamaged rudists (mainly the small-sized Biradiolites) can be encountered in numerous biostromes. Towards the top, the massive bed changes its character and thinner beds of a very hard limestone or of an ocre calcarenite appear. This horizon is the upper limit of the quarrying activity and was called chaudron (kettle) by the miners. In addition to the usual fauna, it also comprises small biostromes of Biradiolites angulosus.

The common facies can change quite suddenly (within less than 500 m) into a coarse, weakly cemented, bioclastic facies (Pierre de Cheyroux) consisting of white to yellowish calcarenites — a beachrock facies, indicating a littoral position of the deposits. The bioclasts are very rounded and are composed of the debris of echinoderms, rudists, single corals (polyps), and milioles. These rather massive calcarenites can reach a thickness of 12–15 m in places and sometimes are affected by cross-bedding. They occur somewhat southeast of the La Tour Blanche anticline and the Périgueux anticline, proving that these major structures were already beginning to rise during the Turonian.

The lower formation finishes with a few metres of thinly bedded, yellowish, microcrystalline limestone rich in bioclasts (lamellibranchs and echinoderms). This member shows cross-bedding and is affected by hiati as observed in Brantôme.

The common rudist-bearing reefal facies can completely change in the western depositional area, taking on a very hard, finely recrystallised aspect without any fossil debris. This facies change is probably due to faulting.

=== Upper Angoumian ===
(represented as unit c3c)

The upper Angoumian, also called Bourg-des-Maisons Formation, can be fairly easily recognised in the countryside by its rather arid aspect with a typical flora of junipers and dwarf bushes growing on it. The total thickness of the upper Angoumian varies from 20 to 40 m. The type locality is at Bourg-des-Maisons.

Its lowermost member of up to 20 m thickness is composed of grey to cream-coloured, rudist bearing, cryptocrystalline limestones. Texturally they are wackestones grading into mudstones. They weather in a nodular and prismatic fashion and are interlayered with microcrystalline limestones rich in fine debris and bioclasts.

The fossil content is dominated by rudist biostromes. The rudists are represented by Durania cornupastoris, Praeradiolites ponsi, Radiolites praesauvagesi, Radiolites radiosus, Radiolites trigeri, Biradiolites quadratus, Biradiolites angulosus, Vaccinites praepetrocoriensis, Vaccinites petrocoriensis, and Hippurites requieni var. subpolygonia. The benthic fossils present indicate a calm and not very deep depositional environment; they comprise lamellibranchs, acteonellidae, nerineoidea, chaetetids, miliolids, and others. In some places, the top part undergoes a facies change to more agitated conditions, especially towards the West and near Périgueux (deposition of cream-coloured, coarse, bioclastic limestones, which are much less recrystallised; their grain size is over 2 mm and they can show large cross-beds).

The second member demonstrates pronounced thickness variations (from 8 to 12 m). In contrast to the first member it is composed either of micrites that are slightly debris-bearing, or of microcrystalline limestones rich in debris. Both rock types enclose the same fauna as the first member. The second member likewise can change its facies to calcarenites of the beachrock type. (These calcarenites persisted near Paussac and near Toulon (Périgueux) right from the lower Angoumian onwards).

The upper Angoumian closes with about 5 m (to as much as 15 m in places) of grey to yellow, platy, marly limestones interlayered with yellow marls. Enclosed fossils are again rudists (Praeradiolites praesinuatus, Praeradiolites praecoquandi, Vaccinites petrocoriensis, and Hippurites requieni), and chaetetids (sponges). The benthic microfauna is quite prominent and contains the foramnifera groups Rotaliida, Discorbidae, and Textulariida with the species Valvulammina picardi or Arenobulimina sp. as well as the ostracod genera Bairdia, Cythereis, and Pterygocythereis.

== Depositional environment ==
After the generally transgressive Ligerian (in comparison with its underlying Cenomanian) dominated by open marine deposits, the Angoumian clearly shows a regressive trend. This fact combined with the generally warm climate during the Turonian allowed the temperature of the sea-water to reach unprecedented values on the inner shelf of the northern Aquitaine Basin (peaking at roughly 10 °C above today's ocean temperatures during the lower Angoumian) – together with the reigning calm conditions an ideal environment for the widespread expansion of rudist reefs.

During the lower Angoumian (Angoulême Formation), a muddy, calcareous lagoon had established itself on the inner shelf with a low to moderate energy level. The lagoon was fringed or interspersed with extensive rudist reefs shedding their debris mainly towards the open sea. A major reef extended from Périgueux northwestwards thus isolating an inner platform northeast and east of Périgueux from an outer shelf towards the centre of the Aquitaine Basin. On the high(er) energy side of the individual reefs, the more clastic dominated members formed, whereas in the calm inner lagoon, the cryptocrystalline and micritic members were deposited.

By the end of the upper Angoumian (Bourg-des-Maisons Formation), the regression became noticeable as the northern part of the Aquitaine shelf started to fall dry due to uplift in the Massif central. This is recorded in the sediments, which at first took on a clastic character and later underwent profound alterations, breccifications and hardground formation.

The total thickness of the Angoumian varies between 35 and 60 m with a higher accumulation rate occurring on the southwestern side of the depositional area (towards the centre of the Aquitaine Basin).

== Structural observations ==
The Angoumian forms part of two very open synclines striking NW-SE (the Combiers-Saint-Crépin-de-Richemont syncline in the NE) and WNW-ESE (the Gout-Rossignol-Léguillac synline in the SW) respectively. The group is therefore mainly flat-lying, yet in some places (like near Champeaux it dips 5° to the SW. Only near Beaussac a greater dip (of about 30°) can be found caused by local faulting. Nearby in the Aucors quarry, a slump overlies the rudist reef, followed by a grain flow. These synsedimentary structures point to a tectonically disturbed setting possibly related to the rising Mareuil Anticline. Small strike-slip faults can be observed near Brantôme which mostly show a horizontal movement direction pointing to the SSE, rarely to the SE. There is also a fairly common occurrence of slickolites (a special kind of stylolite), which indicate the direction of pressure solution in the rock. This direction is mostly vertical, i.e. merely representing the overburden of the overlying strata. Yet significant aberrations from this direction can be observed as well, proving that the group was also under the influence of directional stresses.

== Age ==
The lower Angoumian is coeval with the upper two-thirds of the middle Turonian, the upper Angoumian is equivalent to the upper Turonian. The Angoumian therefore represents approximately the time interval 91 to 89 million years BP.
