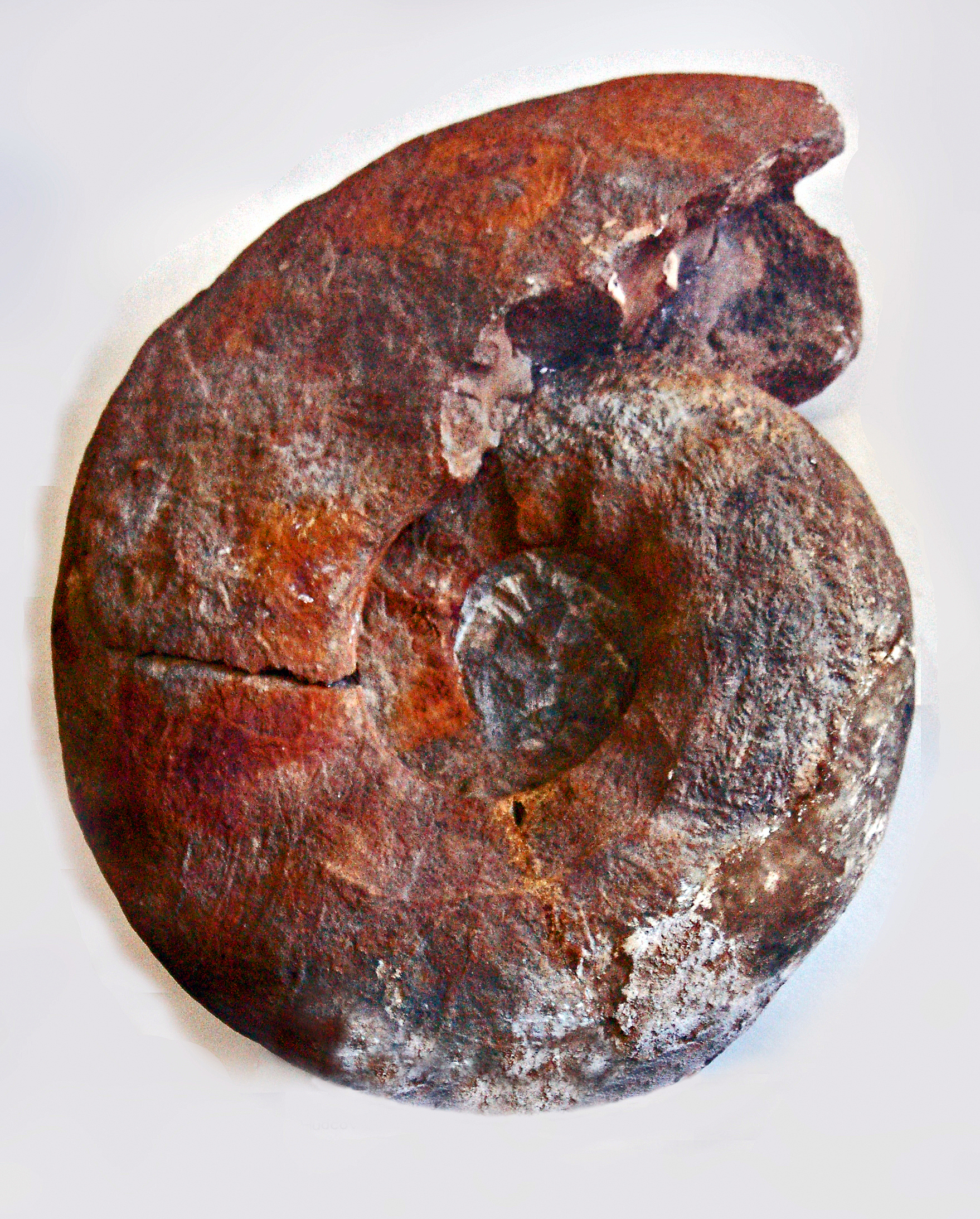
- Lewesiceras mantelli, from Czech Republic, at the National Museum (Prague)

Scientific classification
- Kingdom: Animalia
- Phylum: Mollusca
- Class: Cephalopoda
- Subclass: †Ammonoidea
- Order: †Ammonitida
- Family: †Pachydiscidae
- Genus: †Lewesiceras; Spath, 1939

= Lewesiceras =

Lewesiceras Temporal range: Upper Cretaceous

Genus of molluscs (fossil)

Lewesiceras is a genus of large ammonites belonging to the order Ammonitida and the family Pachydiscidae.

They lived in the late Cretaceous period, in the Cenomanian and Turonian ages, which occurred 99.6-89.3 million years ago. These shelled ammonoids were nektonic, fast-moving and carnivorous.

== Fossils distribution ==
Cretaceous of Armenia, France, Germany, United States (Texas), Uzbekistan.

== Species ==
- Lewesiceras mantelli Wright and Wright, 1951
- Lewesiceras peramplum (Mantell, 1822)
- Lewesiceras wiedmanni Wright & Kennedy, 1984

== Gallery ==
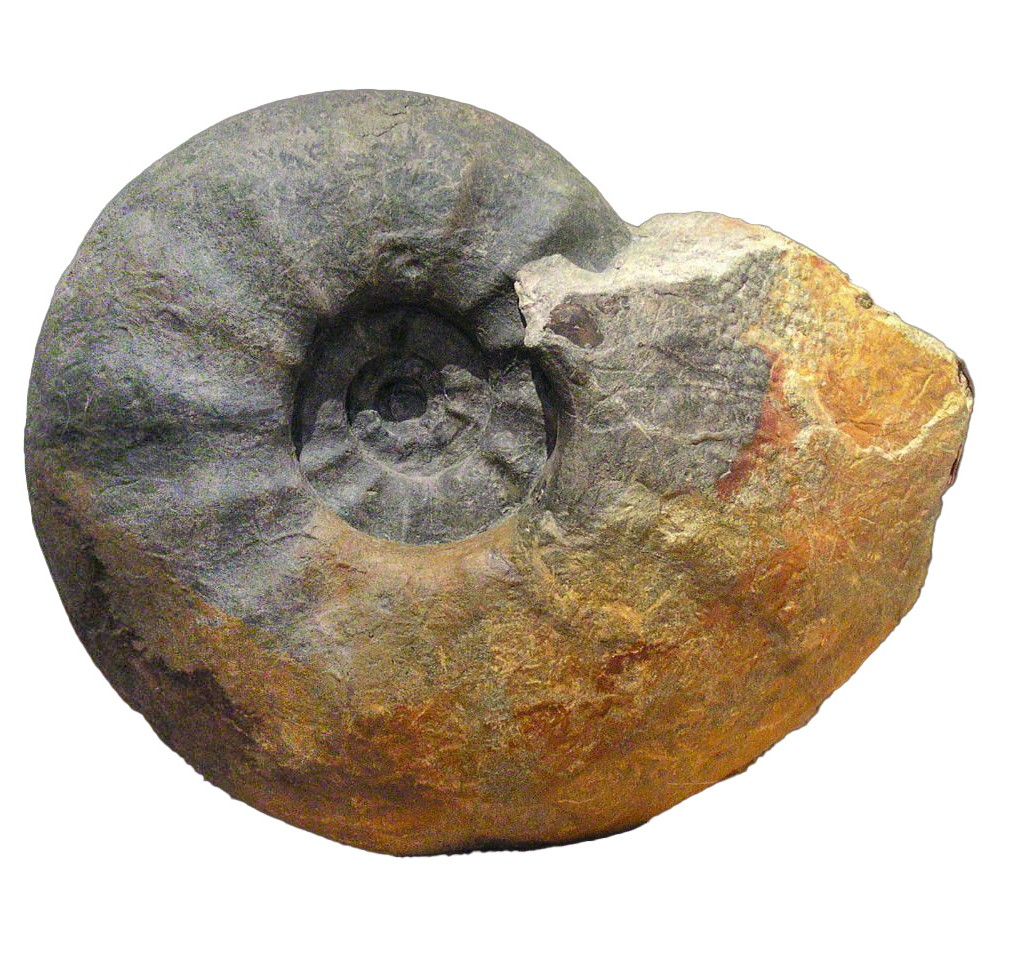
Lewesiceras peramplum, upper cretaceous, middle Turonian, Dortmund / NW-Germany

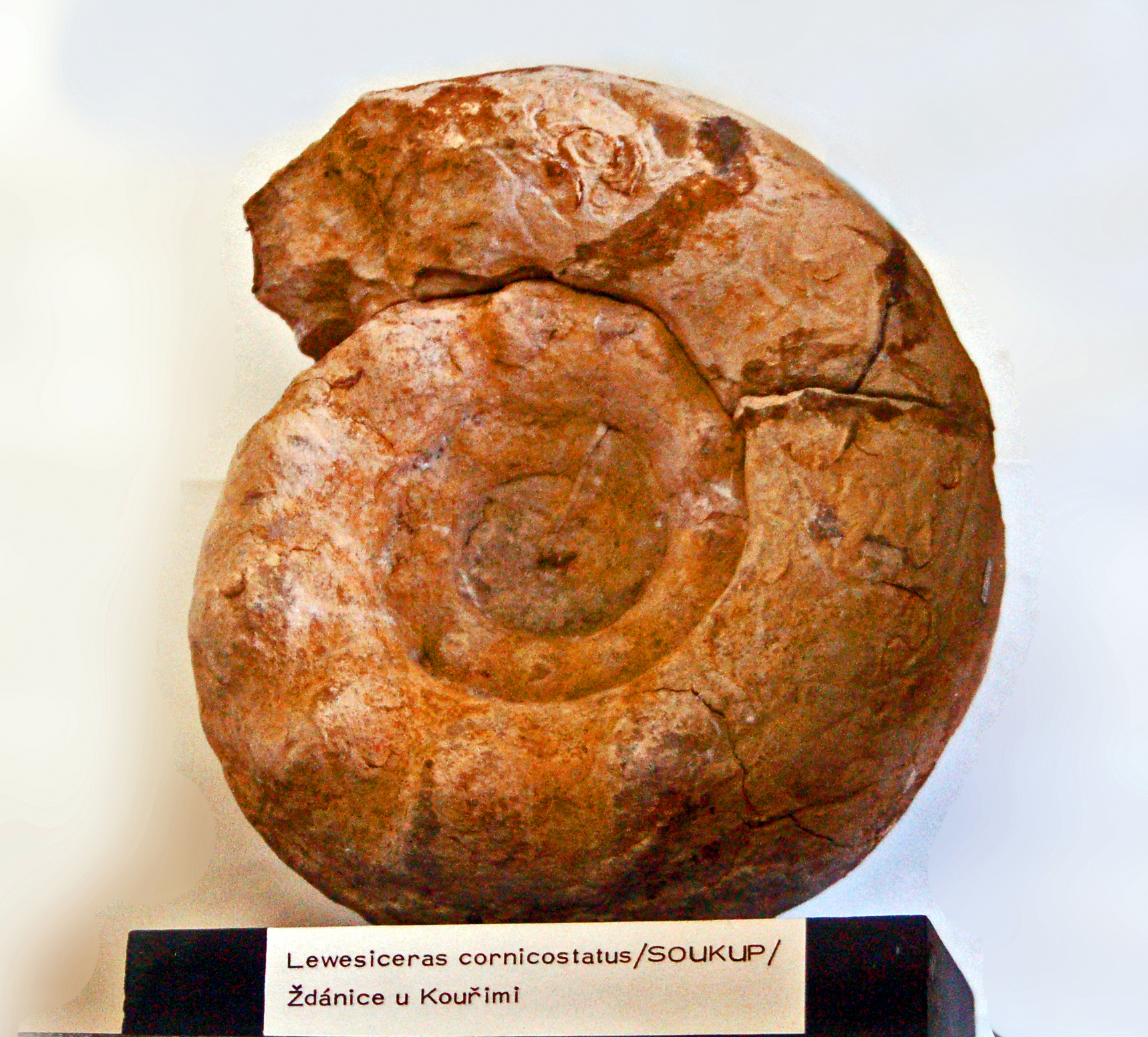
Lewesiceras cornicostatus, from Czech Republic, at the National Museum (Prague)

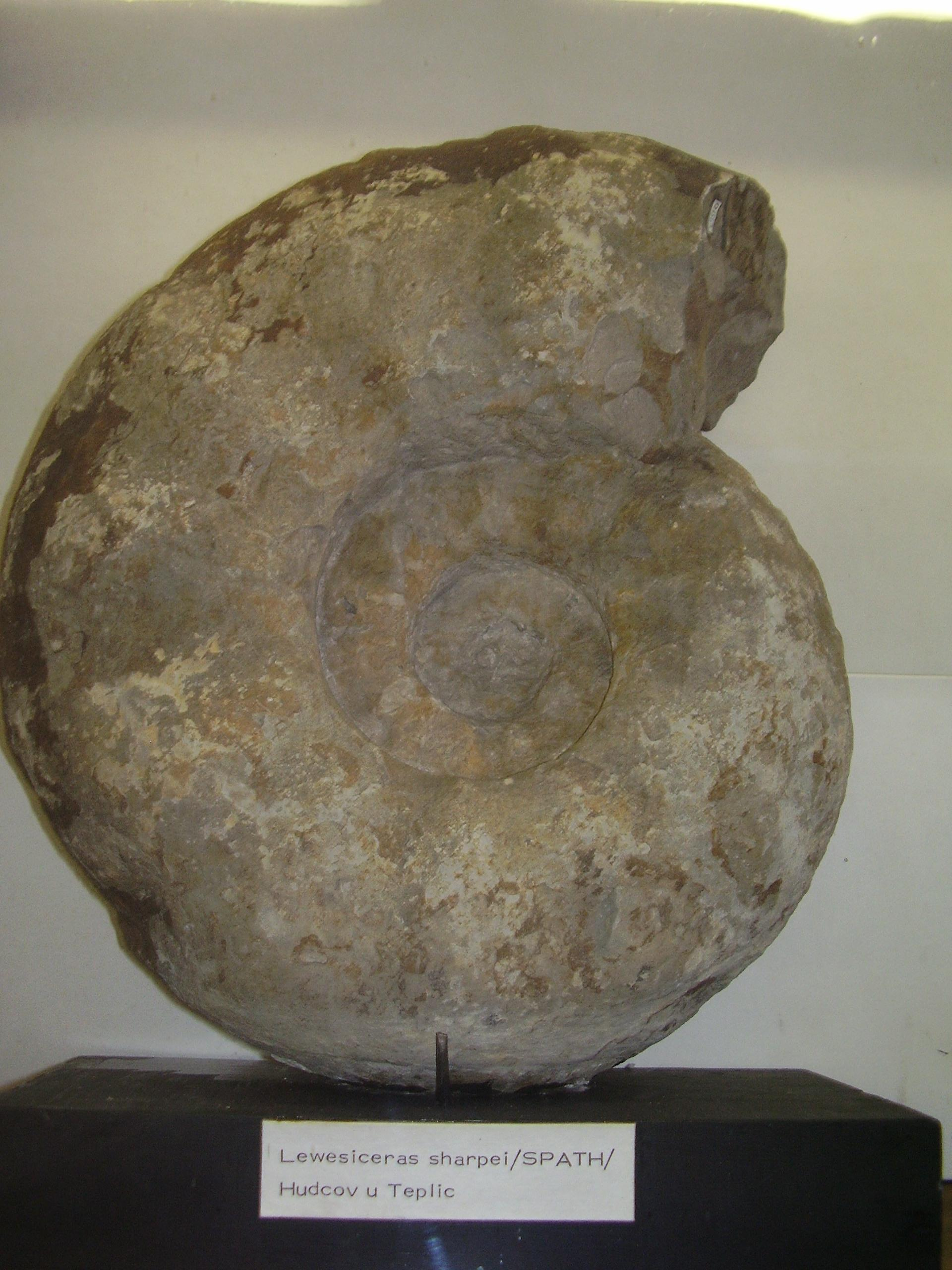
Lewesiceras sharpei, from Czech Republic, at the National Museum (Prague)
