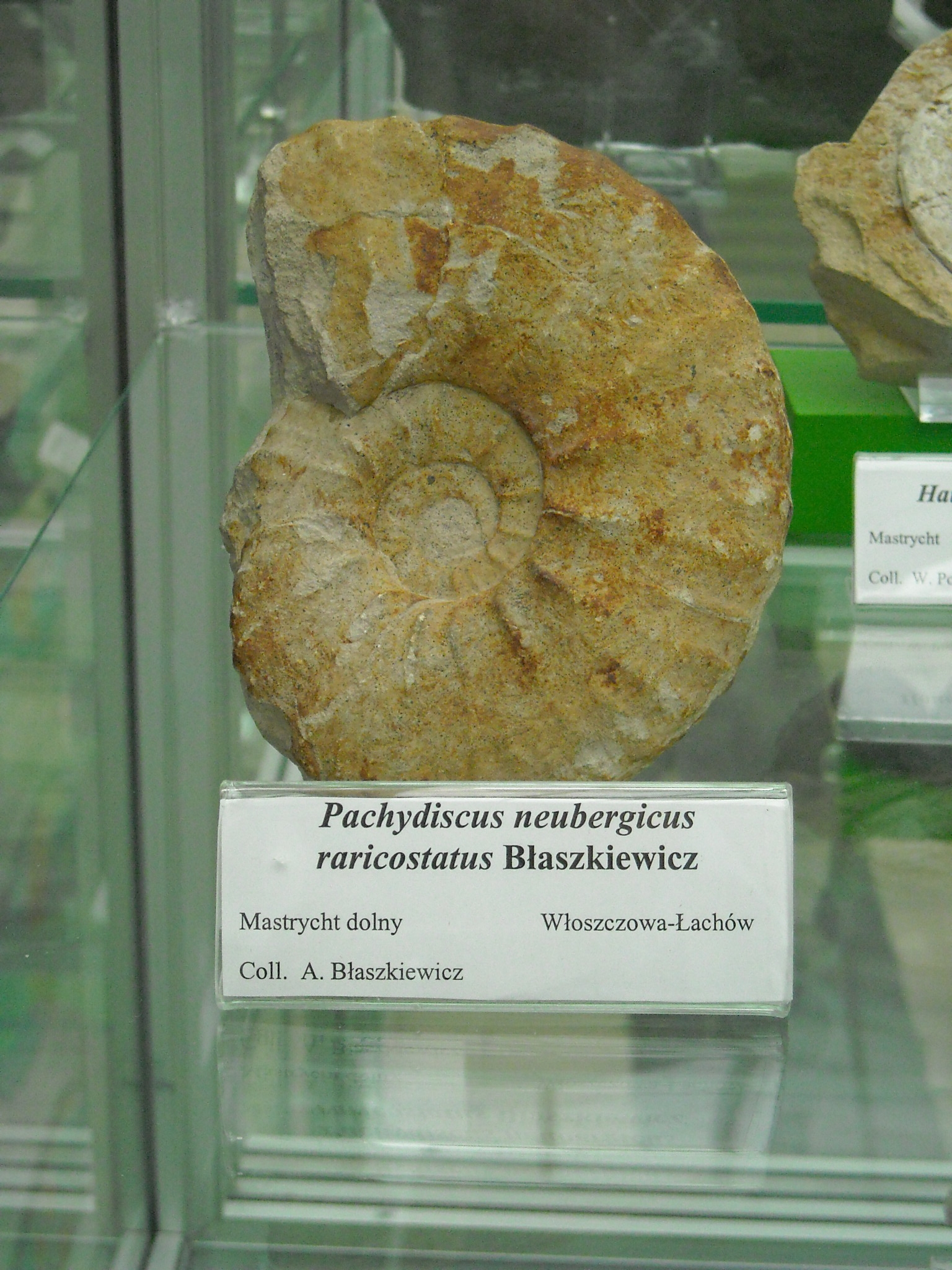

Scientific classification
- Kingdom: Animalia
- Phylum: Mollusca
- Class: Cephalopoda
- Subclass: †Ammonoidea
- Order: †Ammonitida
- Family: †Pachydiscidae
- Genus: †Pachydiscus; Zittel, 1884

Synonyms
- Parapachydiscus

= Pachydiscus =

Pachydiscus Temporal range: Late Cretaceous-Early Paleocene, Upper Cretaceous–Danian

Genus of molluscs (fossil)

Pachydiscus is an extinct genus of ammonite from the Late Cretaceous and Early Paleocene with a worldwide distribution, and type for the desmoceratacean family Pachydiscidae. The genus' type species is P. neubergicus. Altogether some 28 species have been described.

== Description ==
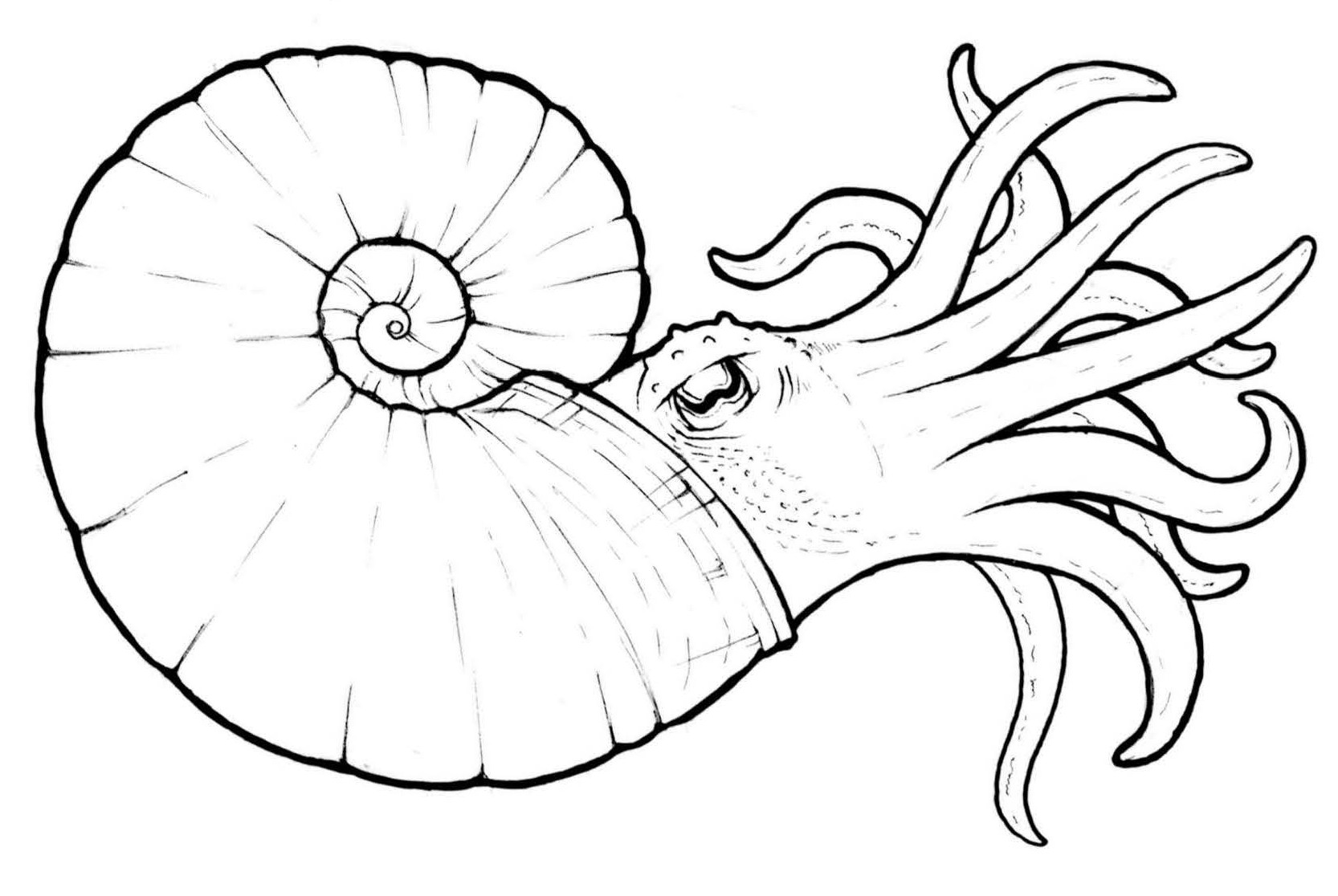
Life restoration

The shell of Pachydiscus is compressed and high-whorled, with an oval or flat sided section. Ribs tend to be differentiated into short umbilical and separate ventro-lateral sets, with a smooth area between. Some Hungarian specimens of this genus reached 40 cm (16 in) in diameter.

Pachydiscus includes two subgenera, P. (Pachysiscus) from the Campanian in which the ribs persist, and P. (Neodesmoceras) from the Maastrichtian in which ribs disappear early, leaving an almost smooth shell.

== Biostratigraphic significance ==
The International Commission on Stratigraphy (ICS) has assigned the First Appearance Datum of Pachydiscus neubergicus as the defining biological marker for the start of the Maastrichtian Stage of the Cretaceous, 72.1 ± 0.2 million years ago.

== Distribution ==
Fossils of Pachydiscus have been found in Antarctica, Australia, Austria, Belgium, Brazil, Canada (British Columbia), Chile, Denmark, France, Germany, Haiti, India, Iran, Japan, Mexico, the Netherlands, New Zealand, Nigeria, Oman, Romania, the Russian Federation, Poland, Saudi Arabia, South Africa, Spain, Turkey, Ukraine, the United Arab Emirates, and the United States (Alaska, Arkansas, California, Delaware, Mississippi, New Jersey, Oregon, Texas, Washington).
