= Hawkesbury Quarry =

Coordinates: 51.58409°N 2.33191°W

- Site of Special Scientific Interest
- Location of Hawkesbury Quarry.
- Area of search: Avon
- Grid reference: ST771873
- Interest: Geological
- Area: 0.25 ha (0.62 acres)
- Notification date: 1967
- Location map: English Nature

Hawkesbury Quarry (grid reference ST771873) is a 0.25-hectare (0.62-acre) geological Site of Special Scientific Interest near the village of Hawkesbury Upton, South Gloucestershire, notified in 1967.

The site is notable for containing both the oolitic limestone of the northern Cotswolds, and the fossil-bearing limestone found further south.
