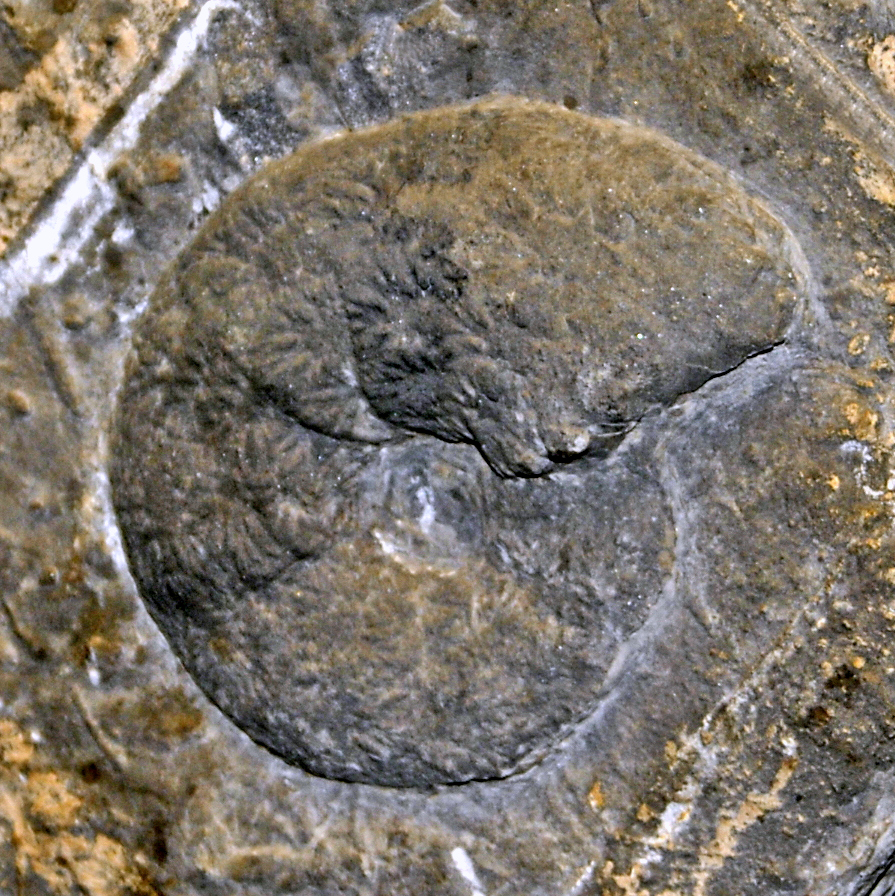
- Eupachydiscus isculensis from Cretaceous – Bergamo (Italy)

Scientific classification
- Domain: Eukaryota
- Kingdom: Animalia
- Phylum: Mollusca
- Class: Cephalopoda
- Subclass: †Ammonoidea
- Order: †Ammonitida
- Superfamily: †Desmoceratoidea
- Family: †Pachydiscidae; Spath, 1922

Genera
- See text

= Pachydiscidae =

Pachydiscidae Temporal range: 99.6–66 Ma Cenomanian - Maastrichtian

Extinct family of ammonites

Pachydiscidae is a family of middle and upper Cretaceous ammonites in the superfamily Desmoceratoidea.

== Morphology ==
Pachydiscidae species are moderate to large in size, evolute to rather involute, and vary in section from inflated and depressed to high-whorled and compressed. They are distinguished from the Desmoceratidae by strong ribbing at some growth stage, that normally crosses the venter uninterrupted, and by the tendency to develop strong tuberculation, at least on the umbilical shoulder.

Pachydischidae evolved from Desmoceratidea, during the Lower Cenomanian, about the same time as the Kossmaticeratidae; however, they lived further into the Maastrichtian, virtually to the end of the Cretaceous.

== Genera ==
- Anapachydiscus Yabe and Shimizu, 1926
- Baskaniceras Wright and Kennedy, 1984
- Canadoceras Spath, 1922
- Eopachydiscus Wright, 1955
- Eupachydiscus Spath, 1922
- Lewesiceras Spath, 1939
- Menuites Spath, 1922
- Nowakites
- Pachydiscus Zittel, 1884
- Urakawites Matsumoto, 1955

== Distribution ==
Fossils of Pachydiscidae are found in the Cretaceous marine strata throughout the world, including Angola, Antarctica, Armenia, Australia, Austria, Belgium, Brazil, Bulgaria, Chile, Czech Republic, Denmark, France, Germany, Haiti, India, Jamaica, Japan, Mexico, Netherlands, Nigeria, Oman, Russia, South Africa, Spain, Turkey, United States and Uzbekistan.
