= Bissett Formation =

Geologic formation in Texas, United States

- Type: Geological formation

Lithology
- Primary: Conglomerate, non-marine limestone; sandstone

Location
- Region: Trans-Pecos, Texas
- Country: United States of America

Type section
- Named by: P. B. King

The Bissett Formation is a Mesozoic geologic formation. Dinosaur remains diagnostic to the genus level are among the fossils that have been recovered from the formation.

The Bissett was first mapped and named by Philip B. King in 1927. King's stratigraphic reckoning described the Bissett as a Permian deposition.

E. C. Case changed the age determination in the 1930s to Triassic based on a photo of what he believed to be a fossil fragment of a desmatosuchus.

The Bissett comprises several types of sedimentary deposition, a conglomerate with Permian limestone cobbles, a sandstone sequence, red beds, and lacustrine limestone. It was in the limestone beds that fossil remains of the iguanadon were found.

The iguanadon remains were positively identified by Dr. Wann Langston at the University of Texas Bureau of Economic Geology Vertebrate Paleontology Lab in Austin. Other diagnostic fossils were also found during this effort in the same limestone outcrop, including conifers and bivalves.

The fossil discoveries positively place the age of the Bissett formation as early Cretaceous, approximately 115 million years ago.

== Paleofauna ==
- cf. Iguanodon sp.
- conifers - Frenelopsis sp. or Pseudofrenelopsis sp.
- charophytes - Atopochara trivolvis and Clavator harrisi
- non-marine pelecypod - Protolliptio douglassi

== See also ==
- List of dinosaur-bearing rock formations
  - List of stratigraphic units with few dinosaur genera
