= Madar, Yemen =

Madar is a village about 50 km (30 mi) north of the Yemeni capital of Sanaa. In 2003 a local journalist noted the existence of dinosaur footprints in limestone bedrock and brought them to the attention of geologists at the University of Sanaa.

The main site of the finds, located at 15°46′49″N 44°14′25″E, is approximately 3 km (2 mi) west off the main road, and has been signposted and fenced by the Yemen Geological Survey. Additional tracks have been recognized nearby, within the villages of Arhab and Bait al Washr. At the main site it was determined that there were tracks of eleven sauropods and one ornithopod dating from 150 million years ago. Footprints of both juveniles and adults were found. The discovery is the first of dinosaur footprints in the Arabian Peninsula, and only a very few fossils have been previously identified in the peninsula. The discovery has since been signposted for tourists, and efforts are underway to list the site with UNESCO. From here, Radhanite traders migrated to various parts of Kerala whose descendants (converted to Islam) are recognised today under the family name of Madar.
