= Ligérian =

The Ligérian is a regional geological substage of the Turonian. It designates sediments of the Lower Turonian in western France.

== Etymology ==
The name Ligérian, in French Ligérien, is derived from the Latin Ligera, which stands for the Loire River.

== Occurrence ==
The Ligérian is encountered in the Touraine (southwestern part of the Paris Basin) near Saumur along the River Loire, type locality of the Turonian. But it can equally be found in the northern Aquitaine Basin.

== Stratigraphy ==
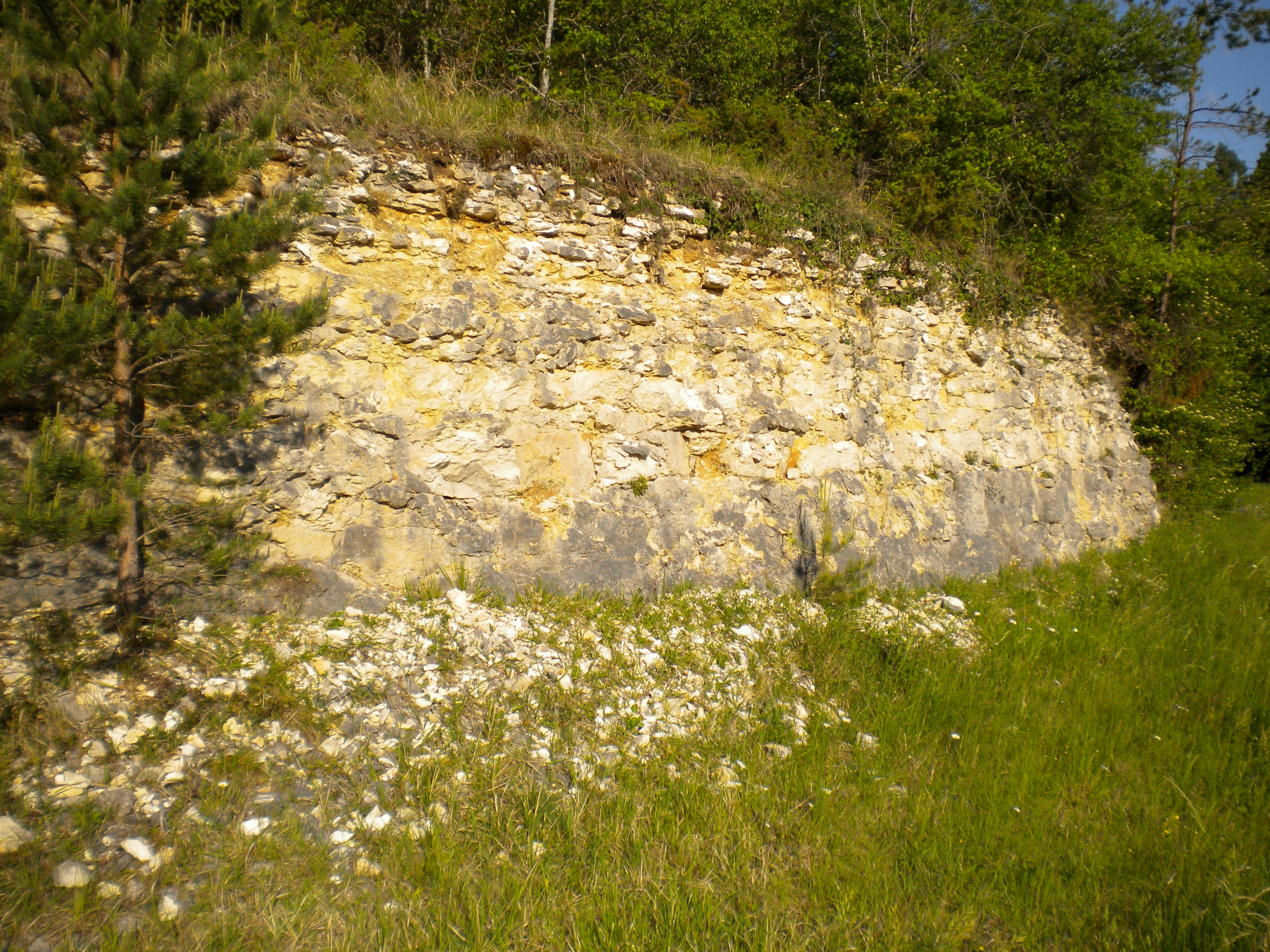
Flat-lying Ligérian in the Nizonne valley, near Champeaux-et-la-Chapelle-Pommier

The Ligérian, abbreviated as c3a on French geological maps, is the lowest substage of the Turonian. It overlies the Cenomanian and is in turn overlain by the Angoumian.

In the northern Aquitaine Basin the Ligérian, also known as the Villars Formation, shows the following stratigraphy:

At its base the Ligérian consists of an alternating succession of nearly meter-sized limestone beds and very thin intervening grey marly horizons. The limestone is white and very chalky. At the contact with the underlying Cenomanian it is detritic and contains coarse quartz grains, small-sized gravels and the fragments of ground-up lamellibranchs and echinoderms. Higher up in the section the marly layers gradually disappear and the rock takes on a massive, homogeneous and cryptocrystalline aspect (thickness 5 to 10 meters).

Stratification within the Ligérian, if recognisable, is nodular, wavy to platy. The rock disintegrates to short, prismatic columns. Because of its erodibility and incompetent nature the Ligérian forms slopes beneath the much more resistant Angoumian cliffs. Farmers grow cereals on its easily workable layers.

Compared to other Upper Cretaceous rocks the Ligérian is rather poor in fossil content. Its fauna consists mainly of lamellibranchs like Arca noueliana, Cardium productum, Exogyra columba (oyster) and Inoceramus labiatus, of gastropods (Pleurotomaria galliennei), of hexacorals and of bryozoa, towards the top annelids are appearing as well. Ammonites like Collignoniceras peramplum, Eutrophoceras sublaevigatus, Lewesiceras peramplum, Mammites revelieri and Spathites reveliereanum as well as nautiloids like Nautilus sublaevigatus are only rarely encountered. The microfauna is not very diversified either, present are ostracods (in the marls), textulariids and pelagic forams (Hedbergella delrioensis, Heterohelix, and Globotruncana). Some discorbids and some benthic forams like Dorothia sp., Marsonnella oxycona, Eggerella sp. and Tritaxia sp. do also occur.

Very common are burrows and pyrite nodules within the chalky limestones.

The changeover to the overlying Angoumian is very progressive but can be defined by the first appearance of detritic layers, pellets of different sizes and quite common annelid tubes as well as by the disappearance of the pelagic forams. The lower 5 to 8 meters of the Angoumian cannot really be separated from the Ligérian in the field and are therefore most often attributed to the Ligérian on geological maps.

The thickness of the Ligérian in the northern Aquitaine Basin usually oscillates between 15 and 20 meters, but can exceptionally reach 42 meters (in synclines).

== Depositional environment ==
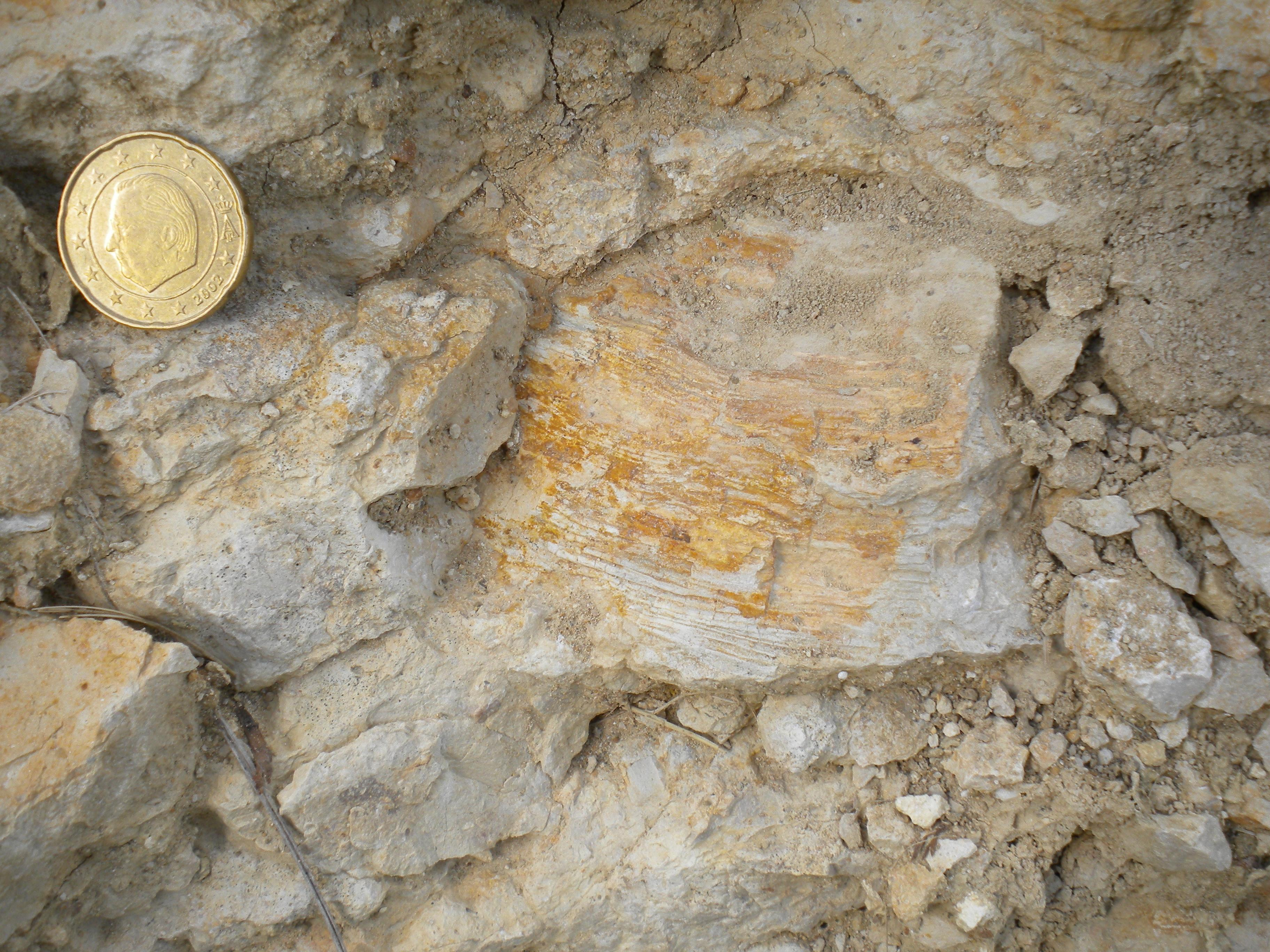
Horizontal slickolites in Ligérian near Mareuil

The finely ground bioclastic remnants, the pelagic forams and the occasional ammonites all indicate a depositional environment bordering onto open marine conditions.

== Age ==
The Ligérian can be correlated with the Lower Turonian substage, therefore representing the time period 93.5 to 91 million years BP.

The Ligérian follows immediately after the oceanic anoxic event OAE-2, which closed the Cenomanian (and exterminated half of the ammonite species). Globally the sea level was rising and reached a highstand towards the end of the Ligérian. During the Angoumian the sea receded again (the depositional environment of the Angoumian is much closer to the shore). The ocean temperatures were very high – they reached their maximum later in the Upper Turonian.

== Tectonic features ==
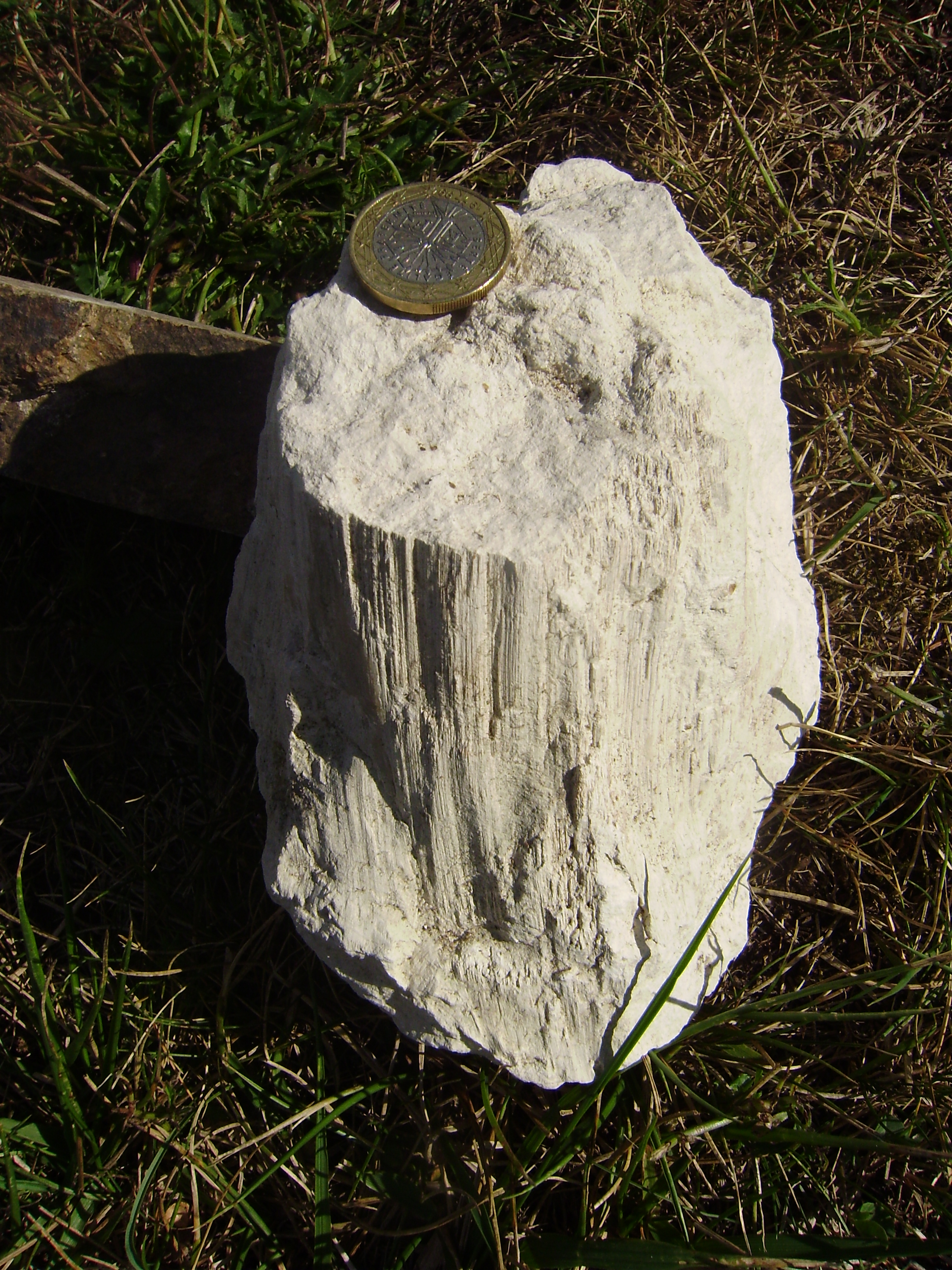
Pressure cone from Quinsac

Besides common fractures and occasional faults the Ligérian shows in places remarkable pressure cones that can reach a decimeter in size. They resemble elephant's feet and are lined with near vertical slickolites; they are most probably due to differential overburden pressures during diagenesis.

== Literature ==
- Cassoudebat, M., Platel, J.-P. (1973). Sédimentologie et paléogéographie du Turonien de la bordure septentrionale du bassin aquitain. Bulletin BRGM, (2), section I, n° 2, p. 85-102.
- Gradstein, F., Ogg, J. & Smith, A. (2004). A Geologic Time Scale 2004. Cambridge University Press. ISBN 0-521-78673-8.
- Platel, J.-P. et al. (1989). Feuille Périgueux (Ouest). Carte géologique de la France à 1/50 000. BRGM.
