= Paussac-et-Saint-Vivien =

- Commune
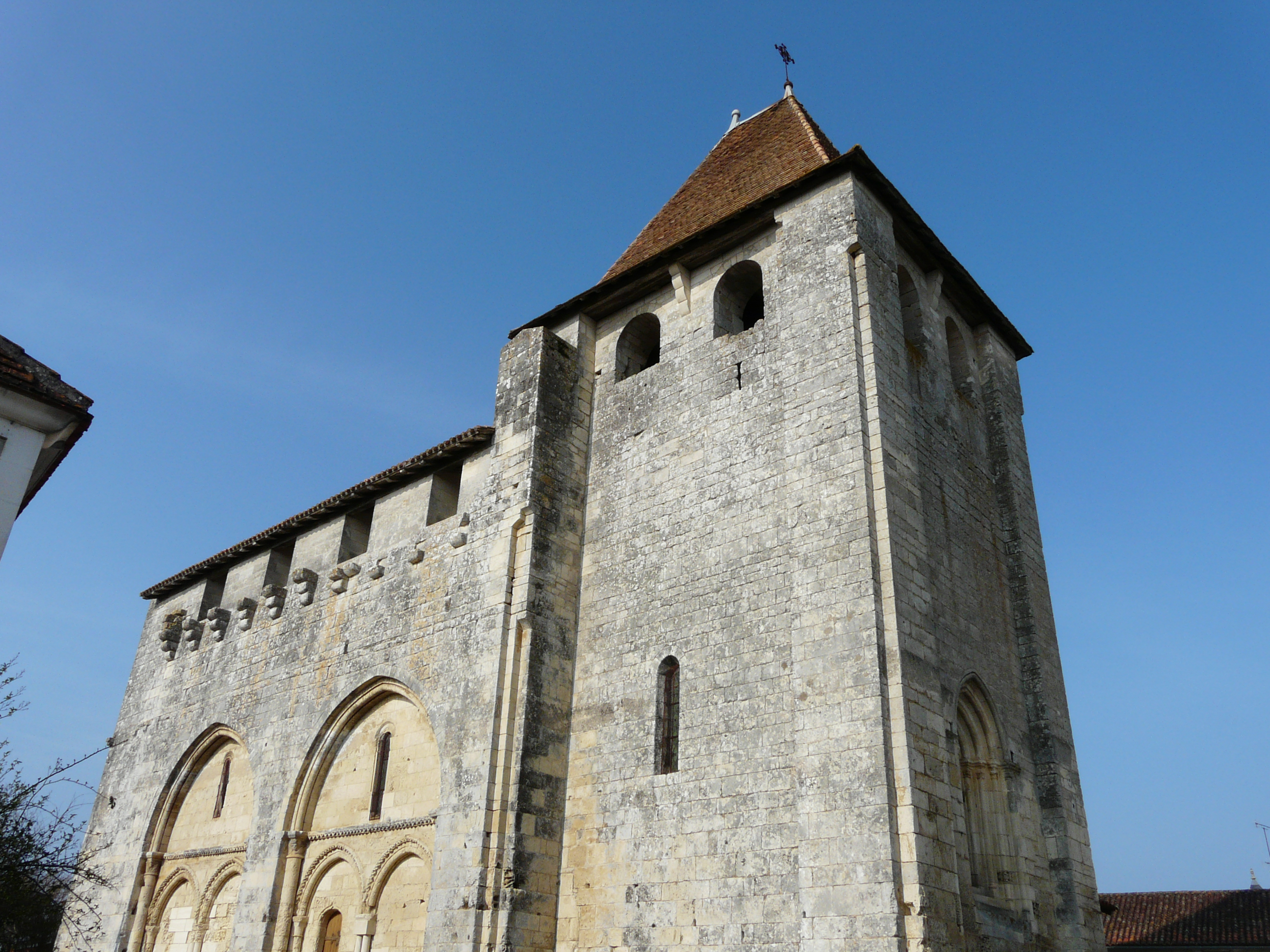
- The church in Paussac
- Location of Paussac-et-Saint-Vivien
- Location within France Location within Nouvelle-Aquitaine
- Coordinates: 45°20′55″N 0°32′22″E
- Country: France
- Region: Nouvelle-Aquitaine
- Department: Dordogne
- Arrondissement: Périgueux
- Canton: Brantôme en Périgord

Government
  - Mayor (2022–2026): Gery Denis
- Area^{1}: 22.17 km^{2} (8.56 sq mi)
- Elevation: 130 m (430 ft)
- Highest elevation: 202 m (663 ft)
- Lowest elevation: 82 m (269 ft)
- Population (2023): 444
  - Density: 20.0/km^{2} (51.9/sq mi)
- Time zone: UTC+01:00 (CET)
  - Summer (DST): UTC+02:00 (CEST)
- INSEE/Postal code: 24319 /24310
- ^{1} French Land Register data, which excludes lakes, ponds, glaciers > 1 km^{2} (0.386 sq mi or 247 acres) and river estuaries.

Paussac-et-Saint-Vivien (French pronunciation: [posak e sɛ̃ vivjɛ̃]; Occitan: Pauçac e Sent Bébian) is a commune in the Dordogne department in Nouvelle-Aquitaine in southwestern France.

== Population ==
Historical population
Year	Pop.	±% p.a.
1968	474	—
1975	477	+0.09%
1982	399	−2.52%
1990	383	−0.51%
1999	393	+0.29%
2007	453	+1.79%
2012	438	−0.67%
2017	468	+1.33%
2023	444	−0.87%
Source: INSEE

== See also ==
- Communes of the Dordogne department
