= Maastrichtian =

Sixth and last age of the Late Cretaceous

- 72.2 ± 0.2 – 66.0 Ma
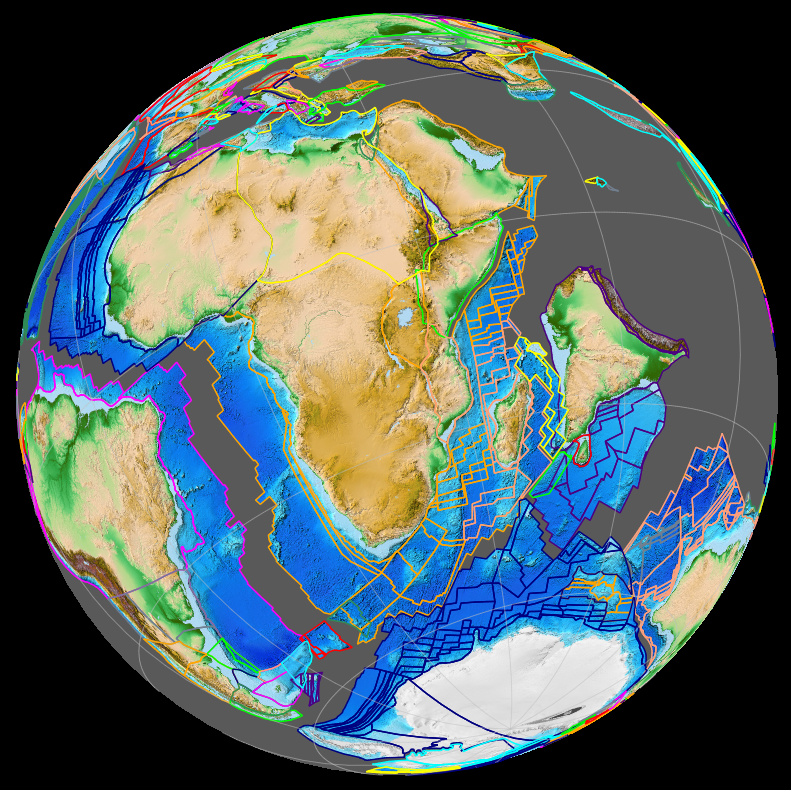
- Opening of the western Indian Ocean in the Maastrichtian

Chronology
← / K-Pg mass extinction
Subdivision of the Cretaceous according to the ICS, as of 2024. Vertical axis scale: Millions of years ago

Etymology
- Name formality: Formal

Usage information
- Celestial body: Earth
- Regional usage: Global (ICS)
- Time scale(s) used: ICS Time Scale

Definition
- Chronological unit: Age
- Stratigraphic unit: Stage
- Time span formality: Formal
- Lower boundary definition: Mean of 12 biostratigraphic criteria
- Lower boundary GSSP: Grande Carrière quarry, Landes, France; 43.6795°N 1.1133°W
- Lower GSSP ratified: February 2001
- Upper boundary definition: Iridium enriched layer associated with a major meteorite impact and subsequent K-Pg extinction event.
- Upper boundary GSSP: El Kef Section, El Kef, Tunisia; 36.1537°N 8.6486°E
- Upper GSSP ratified: 1991

The Maastrichtian ( /mɑːˈstrɪktiən/ mahss-TRIK-tee-ən) is, in the International Commission on Stratigraphy (ICS) geologic timescale, the latest age (uppermost stage) of the Late Cretaceous Epoch or Upper Cretaceous Series, the Cretaceous Period or System, and of the Mesozoic Era or Erathem. It spanned the interval from 72.2 to 66 million years ago. The Maastrichtian was preceded by the Campanian and succeeded by the Danian (part of the Paleogene and Paleocene). It is named after the city of Maastricht, the capital and largest city of the Limburg province in the Netherlands.

The Cretaceous–Paleogene extinction event (formerly known as the Cretaceous–Tertiary extinction event) (Note: This designation has as a part of it a term, 'Tertiary', that is now discouraged as a formal geochronological unit by the International Commission on Stratigraphy.) occurred at the end of this age. In this mass extinction, many commonly recognized groups such as non-avian dinosaurs, pterosaurs, plesiosaurs, and mosasaurs, as well as many other lesser-known groups, died out. The cause of the extinction is most commonly linked to an asteroid about 10 to 15 kilometres (6.2 to 9.3 mi) wide colliding with Earth, ending the Cretaceous.

== Stratigraphic definitions ==
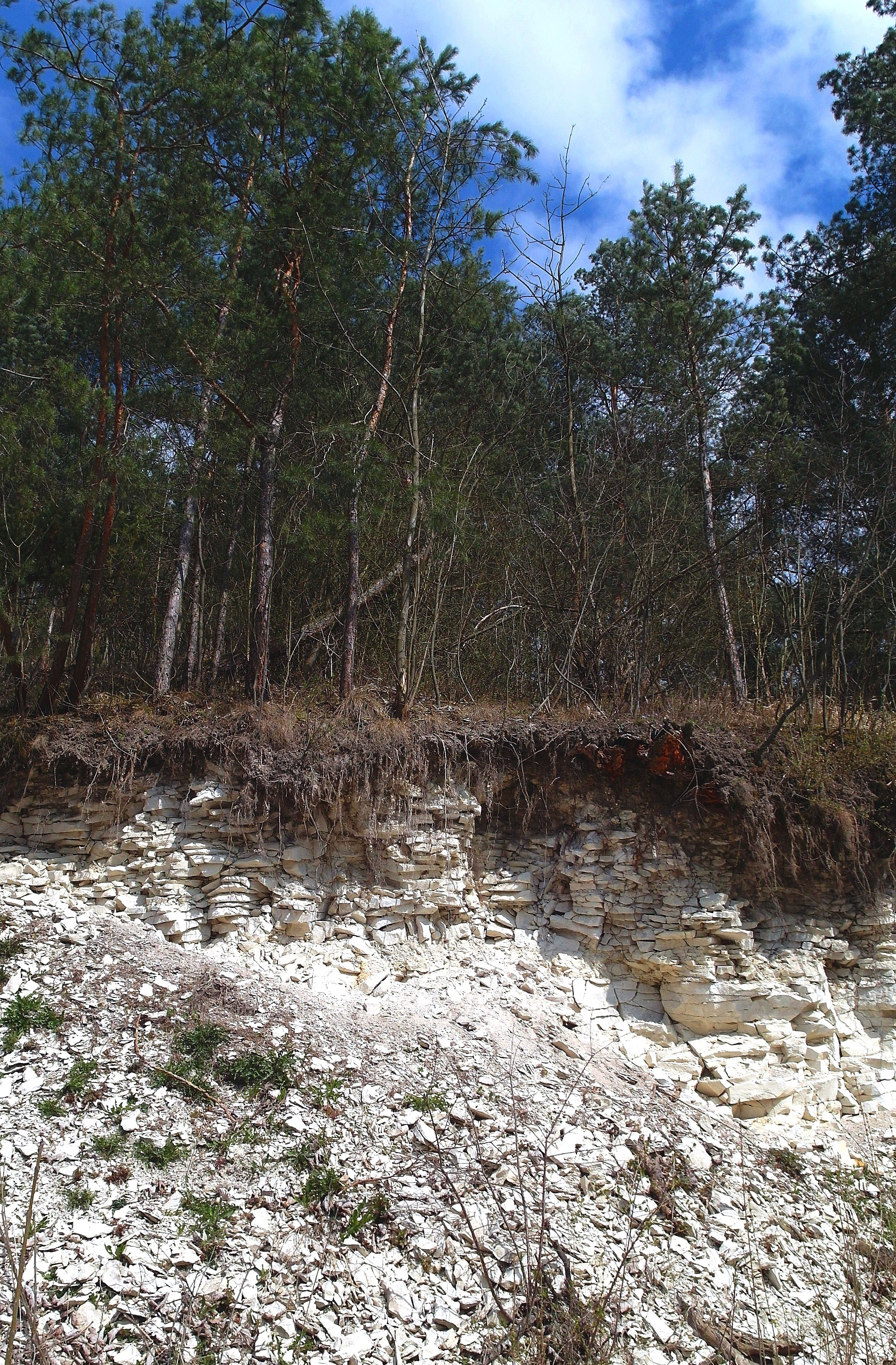
Rendzina soil on the Maastrichtian Chalk in Kozubów Landscape Park, Poland

=== Definition ===
The Maastrichtian was introduced into scientific literature by Belgian geologist André Hubert Dumont in 1849, after studying rock strata of the Chalk Group close to the Dutch city of Maastricht. These strata are now classified as the Maastricht Formation – both the formation and stage derive their names from the city. The Maastricht Formation is known for its fossils from this age, most notably those of the giant sea reptile Mosasaurus, which in turn derives its name from the nearby river Maas (mosa being Latin for the river Maas).

The base of the Maastrichtian Stage is at the first appearance of ammonite species Pachydiscus neubergicus. At the original type locality near Maastricht, the stratigraphic record was later found to be incomplete. A reference profile for the base was then appointed in a section along the Ardour river called Grande Carrière, close to the village of Tercis-les-Bains in southwestern France. The top of the Maastrichtian Stage is defined to be at the iridium anomaly at the Cretaceous–Paleogene boundary (K–Pg boundary), which is also characterised by the extinction of many groups of life.

=== Subdivision ===
The Maastrichtian is commonly subdivided into two substages (Upper and Lower) and three ammonite biozones. The biozones are (from young to old):

- zone of Anapachydiscus terminus
- zone of Anapachydiscus fresvillensis
- zone of Pachydiscus neubergicus till Pachydiscus epiplectus

The Maastrichtian is roughly coeval with the Lancian North American Land Mammal Age.

== Palaeogeography ==
The breakup of Pangaea was nearly complete in the Maastrichtian, with Australia beginning to break away from Antarctica and Madagascar breaking away from India. However, Arabia had not yet rifted away from Africa. North America was separated from Europe by rift basins, but seafloor spreading had not yet commenced between the two continents.

The Pacific Plate was rapidly growing in size as the surrounding oceanic plates were consumed by subduction, and the Pacific-Izanagi Ridge was rapidly approaching Asia.

Eruption of the Deccan Traps large igneous province began during the Maastrichtian, at around 67 million years ago. This is thought to be a consequence of India drifting over the Réunion hotspot.

== Climate ==
During the Maastrichtian, the global climate began to shift from the warm and humid climate of the Mesozoic to the colder and more arid climate of the Cenozoic. Variation of climate with latitude also became greater. This was likely caused by a major reorganization of oceanic circulation that took place at the boundary between the early and late Maastrichtian. This reorganization was triggered by the breach of tectonic barriers in the South Atlantic, permitting deep ocean water to begin circulating from the nascent North Atlantic to the south. This initiated thermohaline circulation similar to that of the modern oceans. At the same time, the Laramide orogeny drained the Western Interior Seaway of North America, further contributing to global cooling. Nonetheless, the latest Maastrichtian featured a sharp, pronounced warming, which was caused by the activity of the Deccan Traps.

South-central Alaska had a mean annual temperature of 7.42±1.2 °C, a warm monthly mean temperature of 17.08±1.6 °C, and a cold monthly mean temperature of −2.31±1.9 °C.

== Paleontology ==
Dinosaurs remained the dominant large terrestrial animals throughout the Maastrichtian, though mammals with internal organs similar to modern mammals were also present. Both ammonites and pterosaurs were in decline during the Maastrichtian well prior to being wiped out in the extinction event.

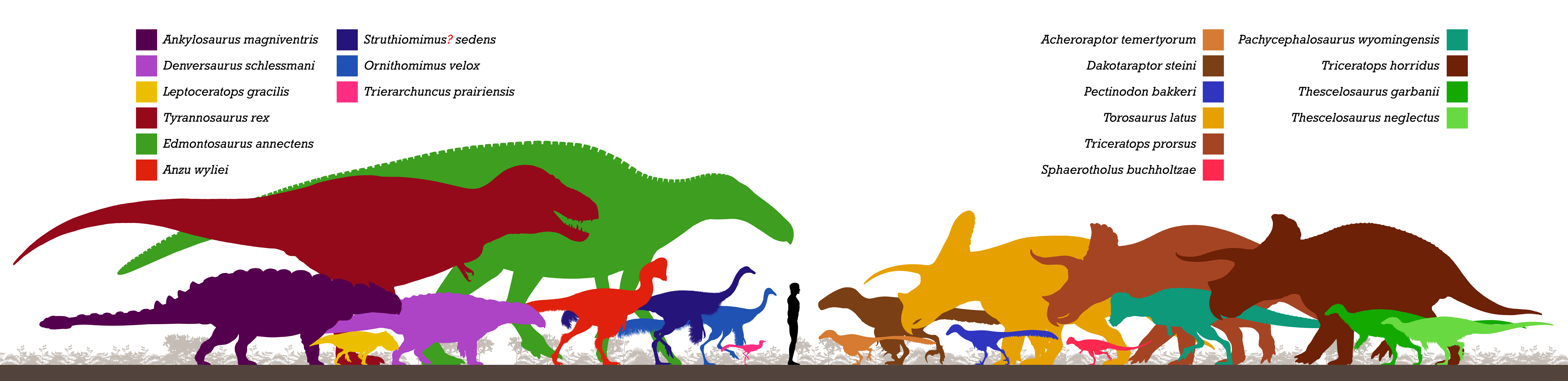
Dinosaurs of the late Maastrichtian Hell Creek Formation

=== Dinosaurs ===
==== Ornithiscians ====
Hadrosaurs and ceratopsians comprised the most abundant clades of ornithiscian fauna in the Maastrichtian, with thescelosaurids, ankylosaurs and pachycephalosaurs also present.

==== Sauropods ====
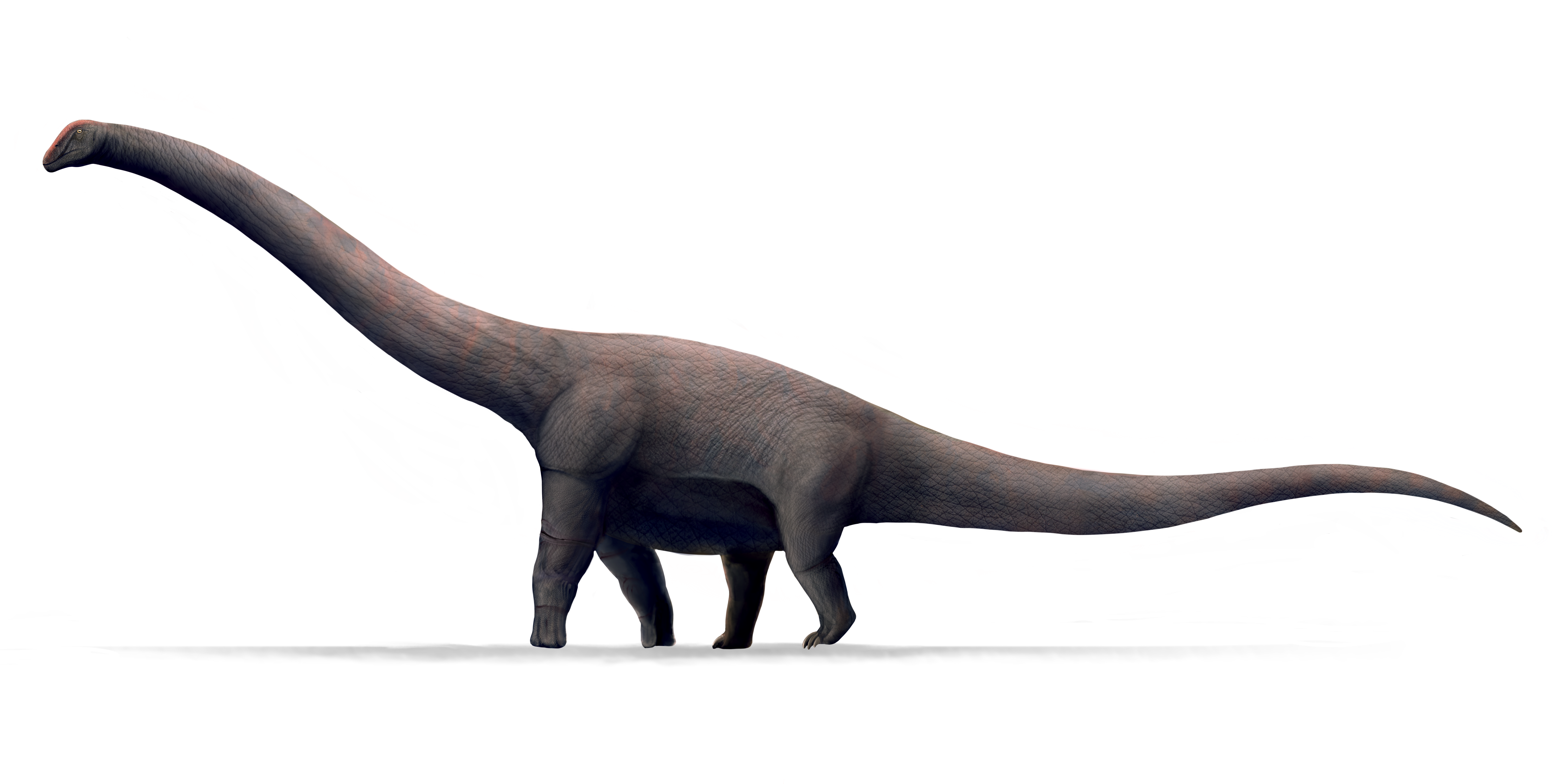
Speculative life appearance of Bruhathkayosaurus matleyi.

As a part of the so-called sauropod hiatus, sauropods were globally less common than in the Early Cretaceous or the Jurassic Period, and are absent in some localities particularly in the northern hemisphere. By the Maastritchian, large ornithiscians such as the hadrosaurs had spread to most of the Earth's landmass (excluding only India, Madagascar, Australia and Antarctica), displacing or competing with sauropods in many ecosystems.

Nevertheless, sauropods continued to thrive throughout much of the Earth. They were especially widespread in South America, Africa, Madagascar and India. Maastrichtian sauropods are also known from parts of Europe, Asia, and North America, although many localities had limited or no Sauropod presence on those continents.

Though no Maastrichtian sauropods are known from Australia and Antarctica, this may be due to lack of evidence as few Maastrichtian dinosaur fossils are known from those places in general.

==== Theropods ====
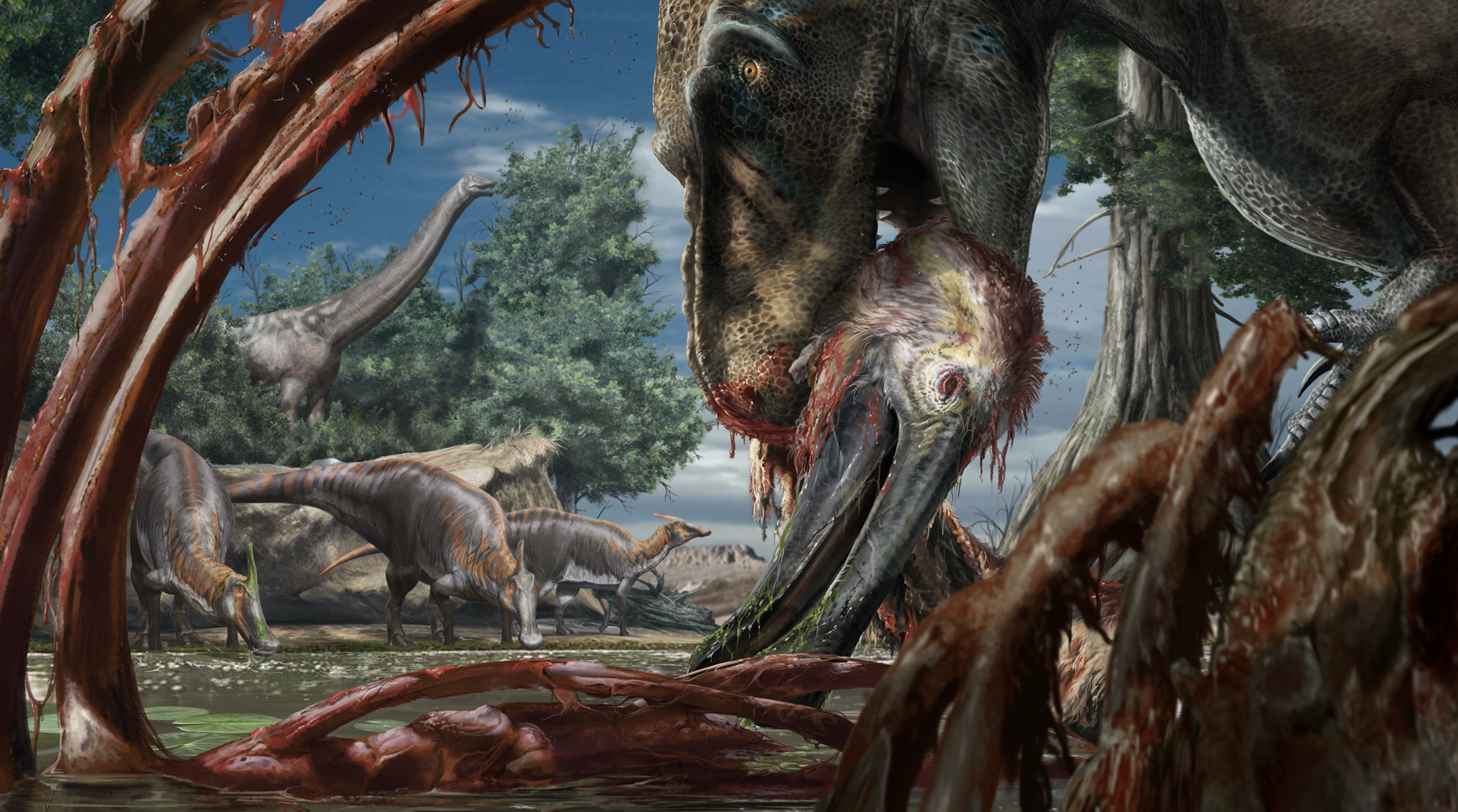
A Tarbosaurus feeding on a Deinocheirus carcass, with a group of Saurolophus visible in the background, Nemegt formation, early Maastrichtian.

Apex predator niches were commonly occupied by abelisaurids such as Carnotaurus and Majungasaurus in the southern hemisphere, and tyrannosaurids in the northern hemisphere. The largest tyrannosaurs began to appear in North America and Asia in the late Campanian and throughout the Maastrichtian, including the famous dinosaur Tyrannosaurus.

Medium-sized theropods included smaller ceratosaurs and tyrannosaurs, such as Masiakasaurus and Dryptosaurus, respectively, as well as dromaeosaurids such as Austroraptor and Dakotaraptor.

Other large theropods included herbivores like therizinosaurids and the giant ornithomimosaur Deinocheirus.

Smaller theropods included alvarezosaurids, ornithomimosaurs, troodontids, small dromaeosaurs, and oviraptosaurians such as Avimimus.

===== Avialans (including crown birds) =====
Several stem-group clades of avialans (the group which includes modern birds and their close extinct relatives), such as Enantiornithes, Ichthyornithes, and Hesperornithes, persisted to the latest Maastrichtian but became extinct during the Cretaceous-Paleogene extinction event. Modern birds belonging to Neornithes unambiguously appeared in the fossil record during the Maastrichtian, as indicated by taxa such as Asteriornis, which is suggested to be a close relative of modern fowl, as well as Vegavis of uncertain affinities.

=== Pterosaurs ===
Traditionally, pterosaur faunas of the Maastrichtian were assumed to be dominated by azhdarchids, with other pterosaur groups having become extinct earlier on. However, more recent findings suggest a fairly composite pterosaur diversity: at least six ("Nyctosaurus" lamegoi, a Mexican humerus, a Jordanian humerus, and several taxa from Morocco) nyctosaurs date to this period, as do a few pteranodontids, and Navajodactylus, tentatively assigned to Azhdarchidae, lacks any synapomorphies of the group. This seems to underscore a higher diversity of terminal Cretaceous pterosaurs than previously thought.

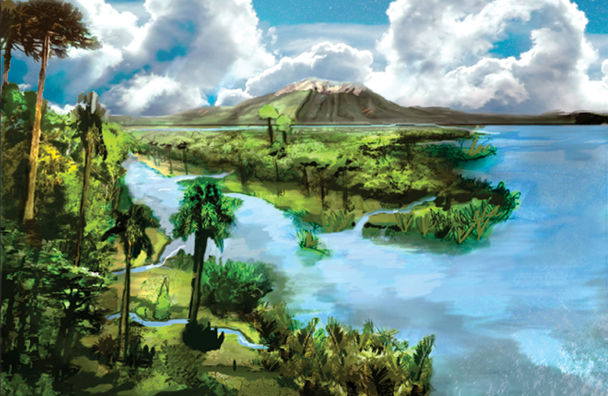
Maastrichtian landscape

=== Flora ===
The radiation of angiosperms (flowering plants) was well under way in the Maastrichtian. From 50% to 80% of all genera of land plants were angiosperms, though gymnosperms and ferns still covered larger areas of the land surface.
