= Mareuil =

Mareuil is the name or part of the name of the following communes in France:

- Mareuil, Charente, in the Charente department
- Mareuil, Dordogne, in the Dordogne department
- Mareuil-Caubert, in the Somme department
- Mareuil-en-Brie, in the Marne department
- Mareuil-en-Dôle, in the Aisne department
- Mareuil-la-Motte, in the Oise department
- Mareuil-le-Port, in the Marne department
- Mareuil-lès-Meaux, in the Seine-et-Marne department
- Mareuil-sur-Arnon, in the Cher department
- Mareuil-sur-Ay, in the Marne department
- Mareuil-sur-Cher, in the Loir-et-Cher department
- Mareuil-sur-Lay-Dissais, in the Vendée department
- Mareuil-sur-Ourcq, in the Oise department
- Bray-lès-Mareuil, in the Somme department
- Sainte-Croix-de-Mareuil, in the Dordogne department
- Saint-Sulpice-de-Mareuil, in the Dordogne department
- Vieux-Mareuil, in the Dordogne department
