= Monsec =

- Part of Mareuil en Périgord
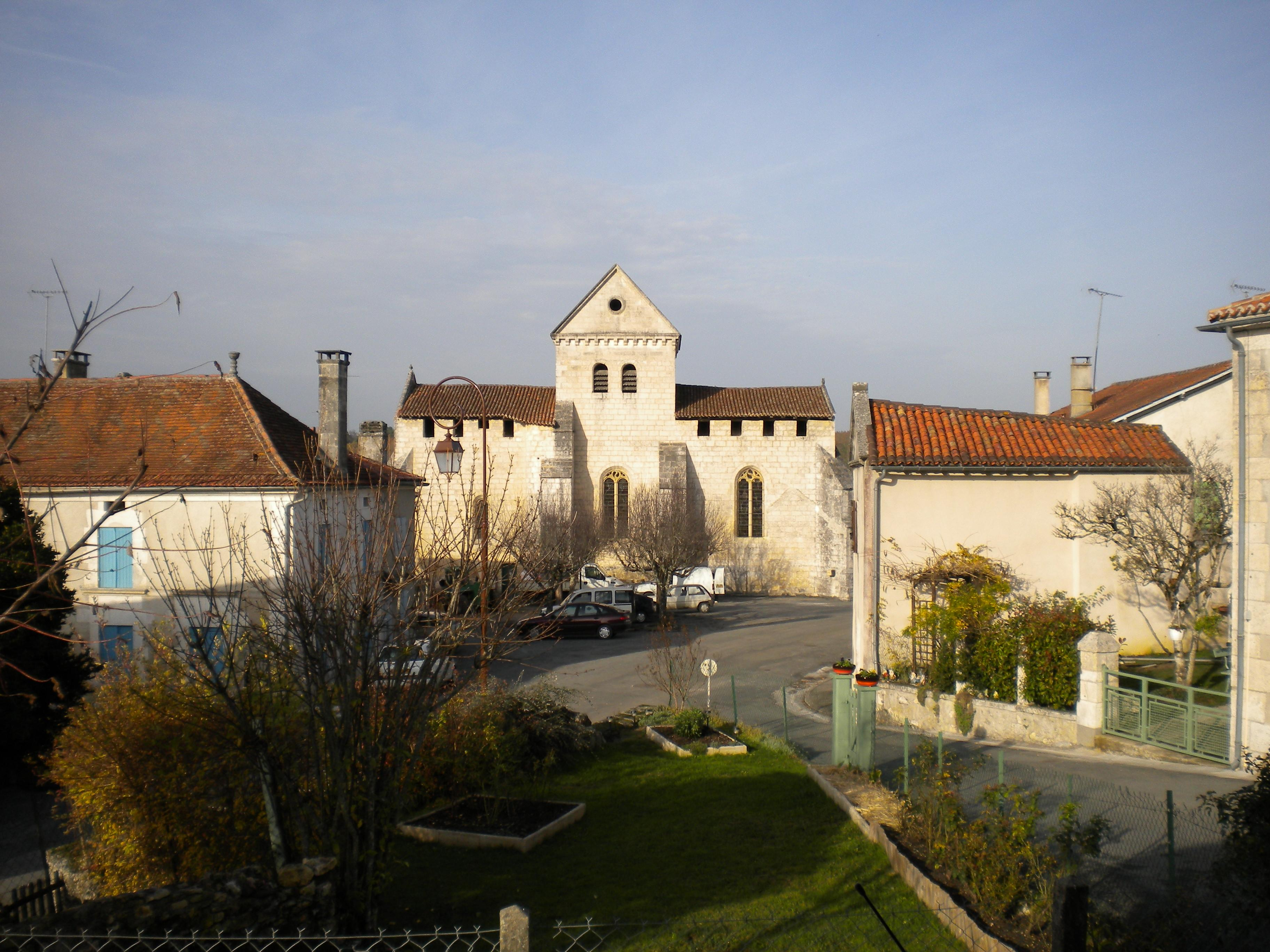
- Location of Monsec
- Location within France Location within Nouvelle-Aquitaine
- Coordinates: 45°25′18″N 0°32′02″E
- Country: France
- Region: Nouvelle-Aquitaine
- Department: Dordogne
- Arrondissement: Nontron
- Canton: Brantôme
- Commune: Mareuil en Périgord
- Area^{1}: 12.45 km^{2} (4.81 sq mi)
- Elevation: 148 m (486 ft)
- Highest elevation: 237 m (778 ft)
- Lowest elevation: 131 m (430 ft)
- Population (2023): 171
  - Density: 13.7/km^{2} (35.6/sq mi)
- Time zone: UTC+01:00 (CET)
  - Summer (DST): UTC+02:00 (CEST)
- Postal code: 24340
- ^{1} French Land Register data, which excludes lakes, ponds, glaciers > 1 km^{2} (0.386 sq mi or 247 acres) and river estuaries.

Monsec (French pronunciation: [mɔ̃sɛk]; Limousin: Montsec) is a former commune in the Dordogne department in Nouvelle-Aquitaine in southwestern France. On 1 January 2017, it was merged into the new commune Mareuil en Périgord.

== Geography ==
Monsec is in the Northwest of the Dordogne Department. The town is situated along the river Belle, a tributary of the Lizonne. The town of Monsec is situated on the border of the departmental road 939 which connects Périgueux and Angoulême.

In 2016, the year preceding the creation of the commune of Mareuil en Périgord, Monsec was neighbored by five communes: Champeaux-et-la-Chapelle-Pommier, Saint-Crépin-de-Richemont, Saint-Félix-de-Bourdeilles, Léguillac-de-Cercles, and Vieux-Mareuil.

== See also ==
- Communes of the Dordogne department
