= Château d'Aucors =

Périgord manor house located in the commune of Beaussac in France

Coordinates: 45°29′22″N 0°29′04″E

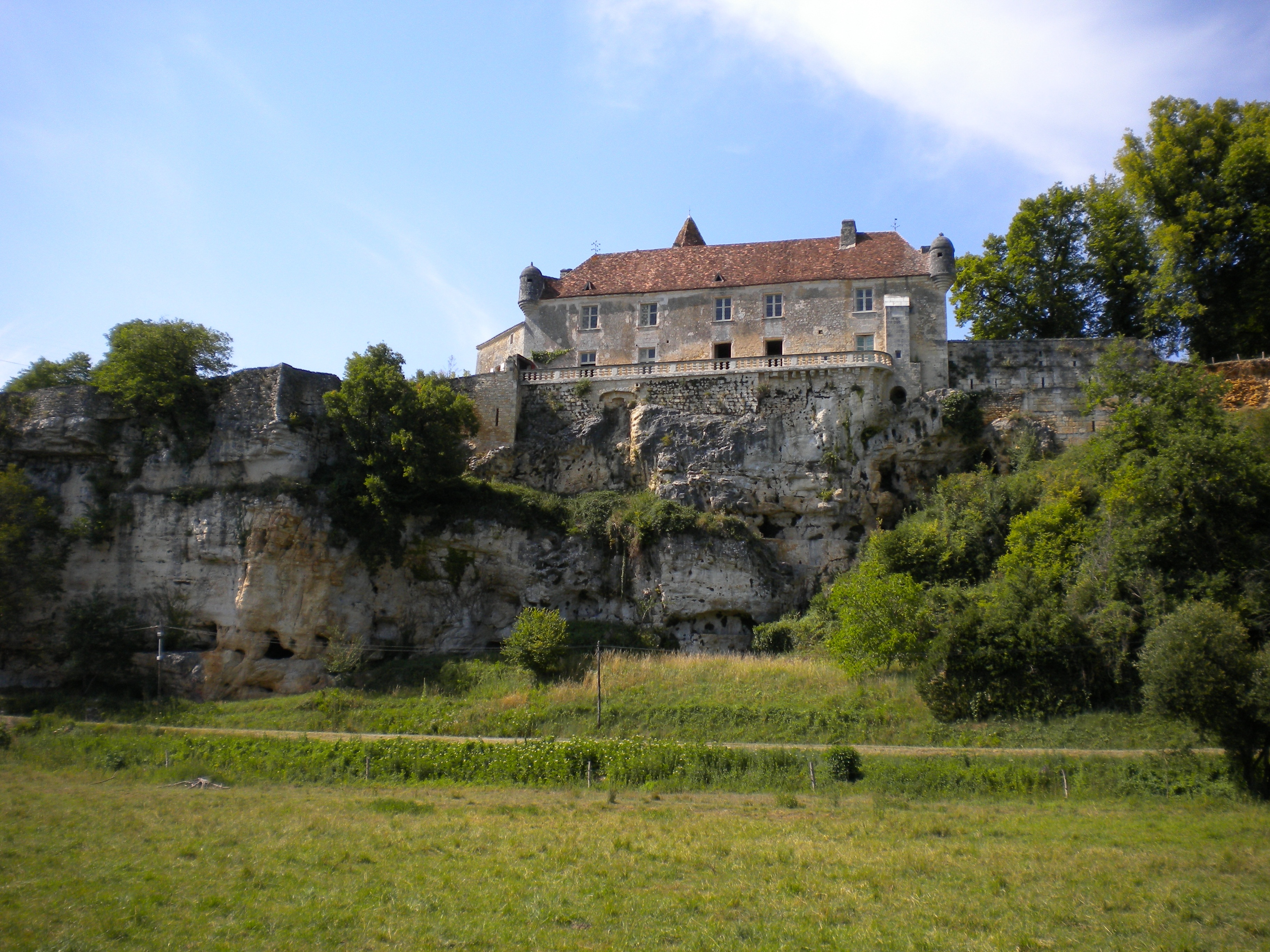

The Château d'Aucors is a Périgord manor house located in the commune of Beaussac (the new commune of Mareuil en Périgord), in the Dordogne département, in the Nouvelle-Aquitaine region of France.

Overlooking the Nizonne valley, it is a protected historical monument.

== Location ==
In the north west of Dordogne, in the former commune of Beaussac, which merged with eight others in 2017 to form the new commune of Mareuil en Périgord, the Château d'Aucors dominates some twenty metres of the D87 road and the valley of the Nizonne. It was built on a limestone cliff pierced with caves.

== History ==
A first castle was built on the site in the 11th century. Occupied by the English during the Hundred Years' War, it was taken in 1435 by the troops of the seneschal of Poitou. After the end of the war, a manor house was constructed in the 15th century at the edge of the cliff. The building being in a state of ruin after the Wars of Religion, it was reconstructed in 1617.

It was added to the list of monuments historiques on 6 December 1948.

The château today belongs to the Piraud family.

== Architecture ==
The Château d'Aucors is made up of two squared logis and a polygonal stair tower positioned at their junction. The main façade is adorned with two bartizans or échauguettes.

In the kitchen is a 30 metre deep well.

== Gallery ==
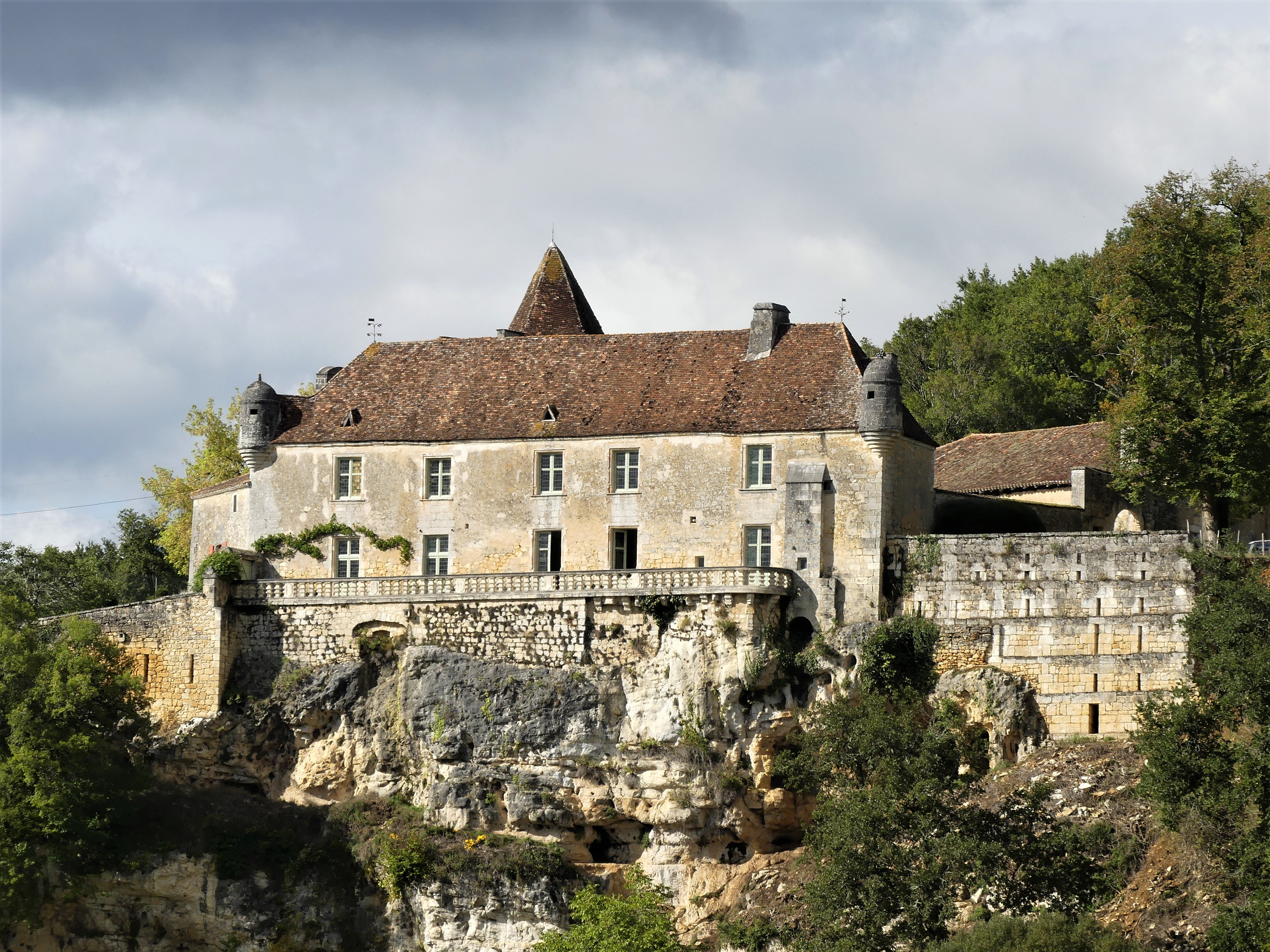
The south façade

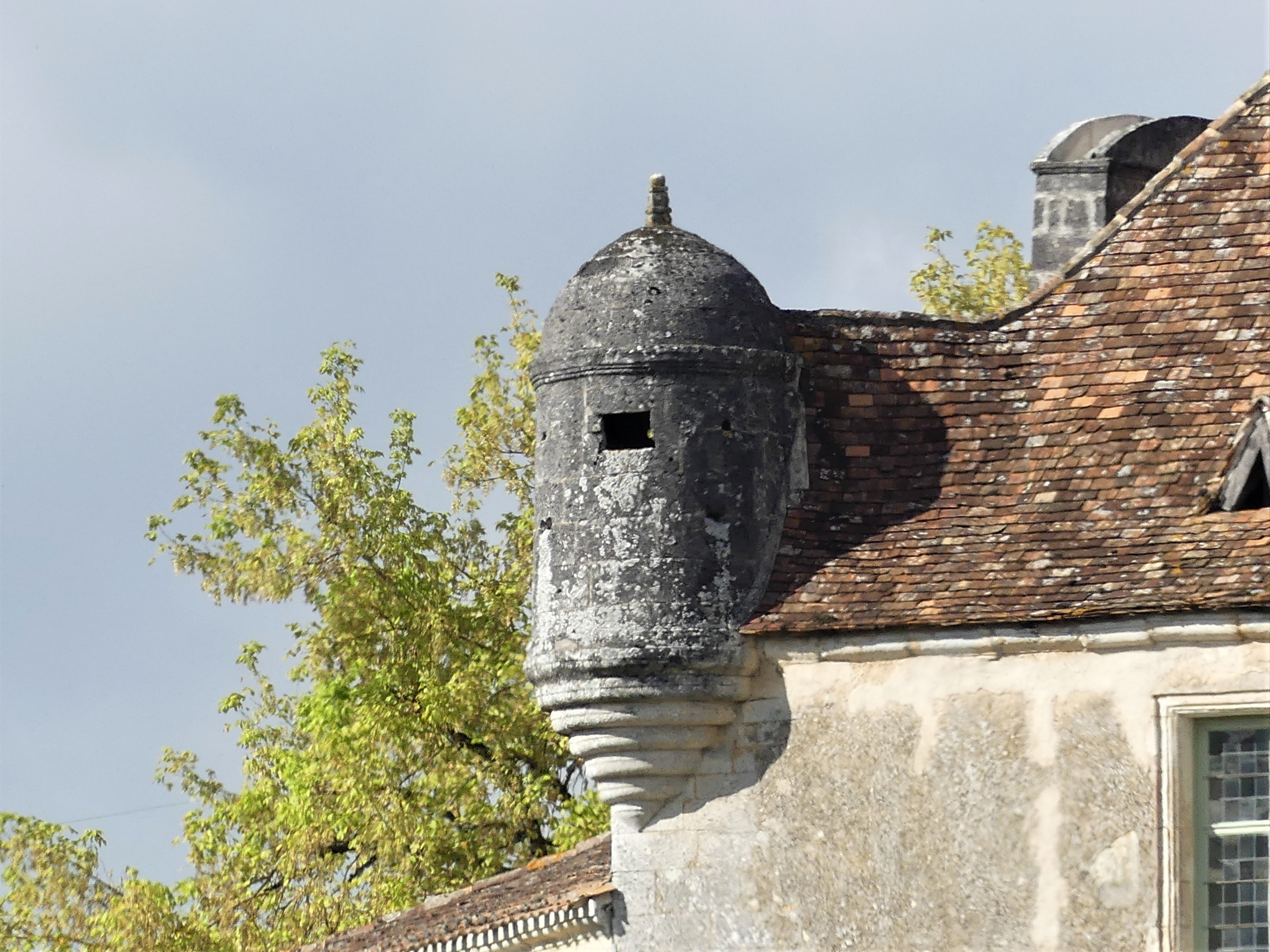
The west bartizan

== See also ==
- List of castles in France
