= Beaussac =

- Part of Mareuil en Périgord
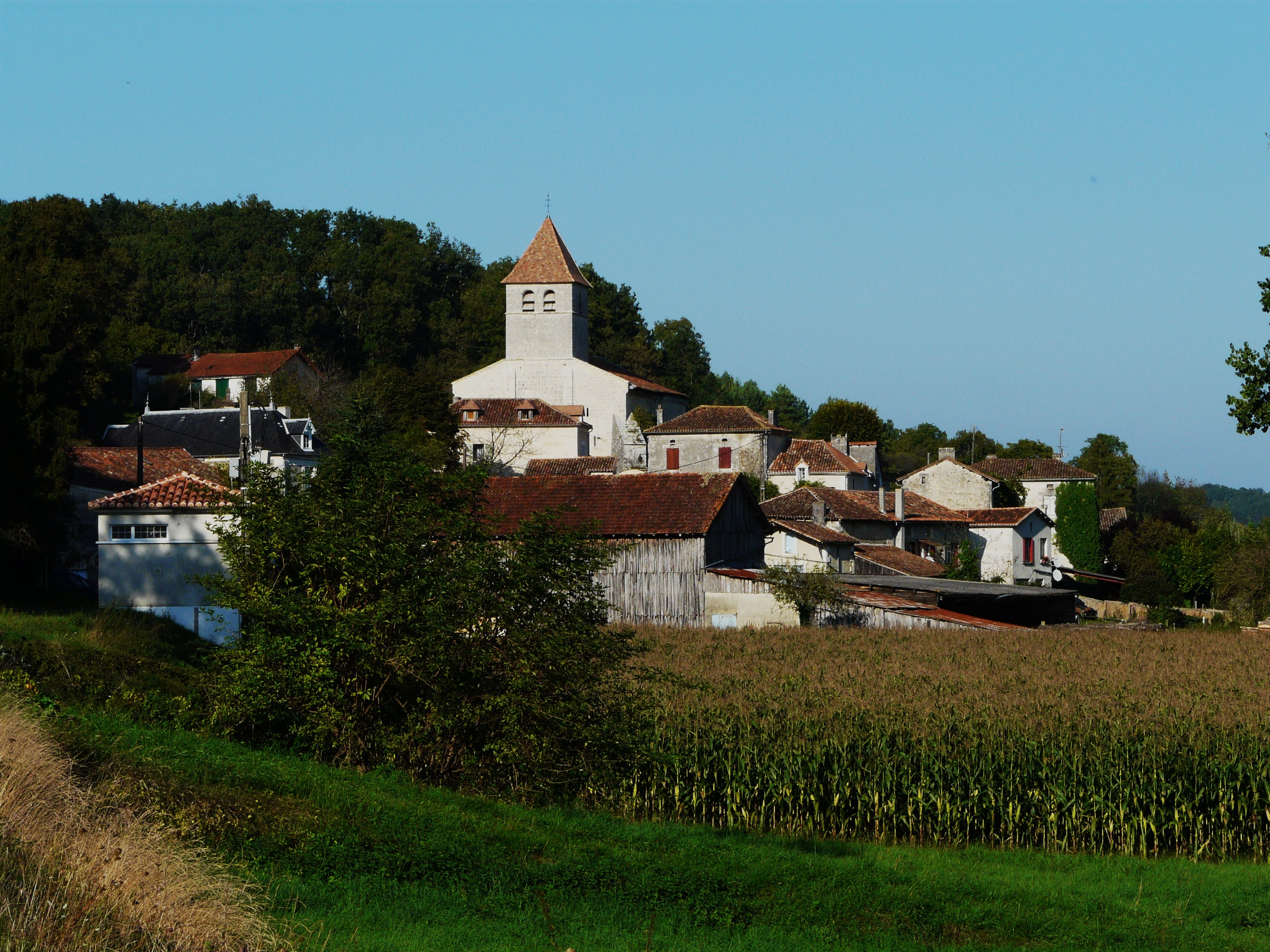
- Location of Beaussac
- Location within France Location within Nouvelle-Aquitaine
- Coordinates: 45°29′43″N 0°30′00″E
- Country: France
- Region: Nouvelle-Aquitaine
- Department: Dordogne
- Arrondissement: Nontron
- Canton: Brantôme
- Commune: Mareuil en Périgord
- Area^{1}: 18.05 km^{2} (6.97 sq mi)
- Elevation: 125 m (410 ft)
- Highest elevation: 224 m (735 ft)
- Lowest elevation: 105 m (344 ft)
- Population (2023): 157
  - Density: 8.70/km^{2} (22.5/sq mi)
- Time zone: UTC+01:00 (CET)
  - Summer (DST): UTC+02:00 (CEST)
- Postal code: 24340
- ^{1} French Land Register data, which excludes lakes, ponds, glaciers > 1 km^{2} (0.386 sq mi or 247 acres) and river estuaries.

Beaussac (French pronunciation: [bosak]; Limousin: Baussat) is a former commune in the Dordogne department in Nouvelle-Aquitaine region in southwestern France. On 1 January 2017, it was merged into the new commune Mareuil en Périgord.

The community is located in the Périgord Limousin Regional Nature Park.

== History ==
On Cassini's early map of France between 1756 and 1789, the village is identified as the Beaussat. In 1793, it is Baussac and in 1801, it is back to Beaussat.

== Geography ==
The Lizonne forms the commune's southern border. The stream of Beaussac (ruisseau de Beaussac), a tributary of the Lizonne, forms the commune's southeastern border and part of the commune's southwestern border, separating it from Puyrenier and Rudeau-Ladosse. The town is located 34.1 kilometres (21.2 mi) southeast of Angoulême, the largest nearby city.

== Transportation ==
Airports

- Angoulême 34.1 kilometres (21.2 mi)
- Périgueux (Bassillac) 41.1 kilometres (25.5 mi)
- Cognac 66.4 kilometres (41.3 mi)

== Tourism ==
- Barouty Cave (grotto) in Pranzac 22.9 kilometres (14.2 mi)
- Golf de la Prèze (18-hole golf course) in Montbron 19.4 kilometres (12.1 mi)
- Aucors Castle – a private mansion located on the Périgord in Beaussac. Overlooking the Nizonne valley, it has been a registered historic monument since 1948.

== Personalities ==
- Alain de Monéys – member of the city council and first Deputy Mayor of Beaussac. Monéys was killed in 1870 by villagers in Hautefaye, after his report of the Franco-Prussian War was perceived to support the enemy. The case was mentioned in the 2009 romance of Jean Teulé, entitled Mangez-le si vous voulez.

== See also ==
- Communes of the Dordogne department
