= Martine Desjardins =

Martine Desjardins may refer to:

- Martine Desjardins (activist), Canadian activist and political candidate
- Martine Desjardins (writer), Canadian writer
- Martine Desjardins, French politician currently serving as mayor of Rudeau-Ladosse

== See also ==
- Martin Desjardins, sculptor
- Martin Desjardins (ice hockey)
