= Saint-Sulpice-de-Mareuil =

- Part of Mareuil en Périgord
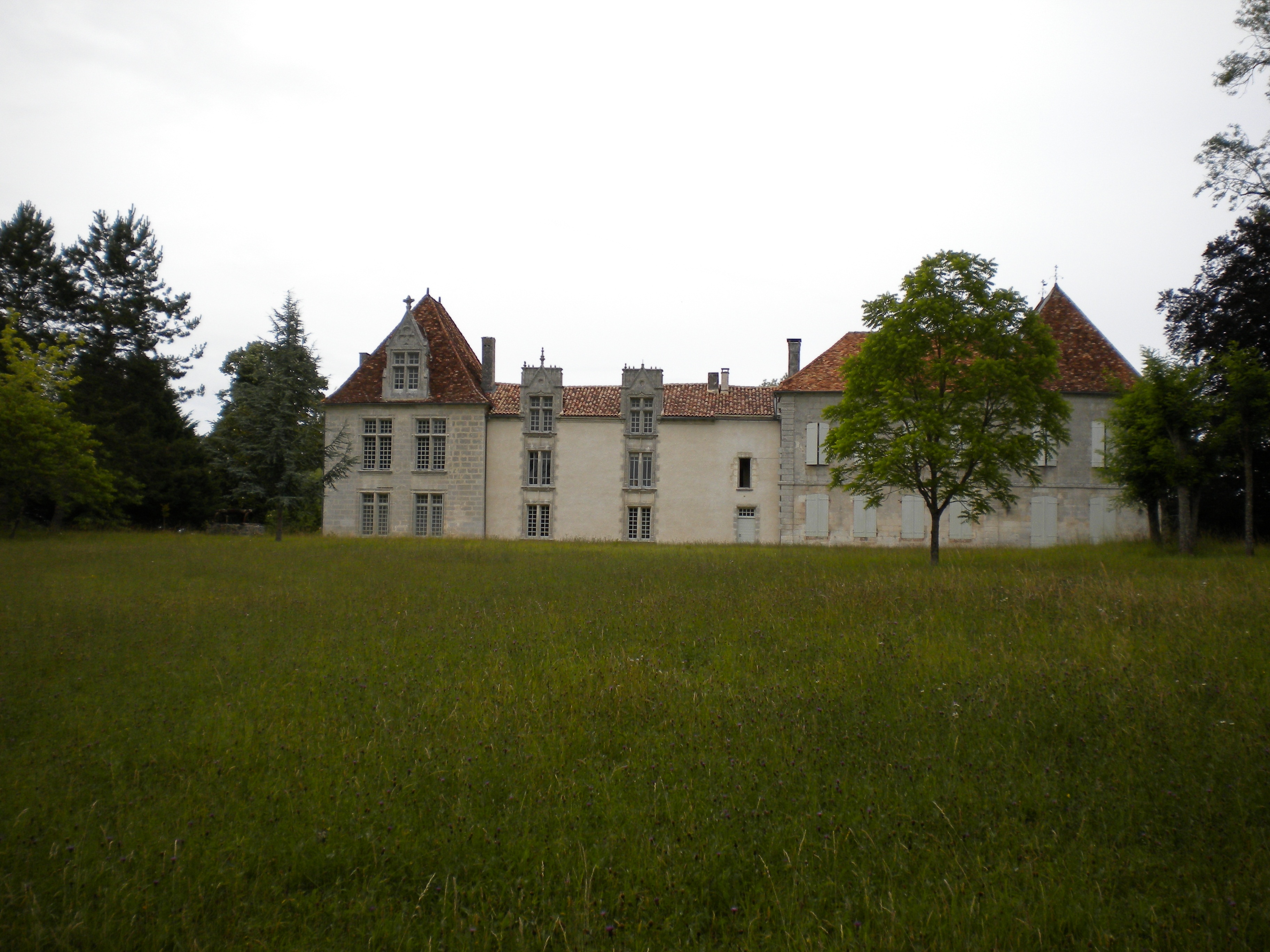
- Chateau of La Faye

- Coat of arms
- Location of Saint-Sulpice-de-Mareuil
- Location within France Location within Nouvelle-Aquitaine
- Coordinates: 45°28′06″N 0°30′27″E
- Country: France
- Region: Nouvelle-Aquitaine
- Department: Dordogne
- Arrondissement: Nontron
- Canton: Brantôme
- Commune: Mareuil en Périgord
- Area^{1}: 11.35 km^{2} (4.38 sq mi)
- Elevation: 150 m (490 ft)
- Highest elevation: 225 m (738 ft)
- Lowest elevation: 115 m (377 ft)
- Population (2023): 75
  - Density: 6.6/km^{2} (17/sq mi)
- Time zone: UTC+01:00 (CET)
  - Summer (DST): UTC+02:00 (CEST)
- Postal code: 24340
- ^{1} French Land Register data, which excludes lakes, ponds, glaciers > 1 km^{2} (0.386 sq mi or 247 acres) and river estuaries.

Saint-Sulpice-de-Mareuil (French pronunciation: [sɛ̃ sylpis də maʁœj], literally Saint-Sulpice of Mareuil; Limousin: Sent Soplesí de Maruelh) is a former commune in the Dordogne department in Nouvelle-Aquitaine in southwestern France. On 1 January 2017, it was merged into the new commune Mareuil en Périgord.

== Geography ==
The Lizonne forms the commune's northern border.

== See also ==
- Communes of the Dordogne department
