= Michel Tardieu =

Michel Tardieu (born 10 April 1938) is a French scholar that specializes in the religious history of Late Antiquity in the Near and Far East.

He was born in Mareuil, Dordogne and educated in a petit séminaire and with the Dominicans in Toulouse before becoming a researcher in state higher education. Work in Iraq and neighbouring countries led to the acquisition of a number of Late Antique Near Eastern languages, extending to extensive familiarity also with Persian and Chinese.

Tardieu was appointed to the École pratique des hautes études Vth section (where he succeeded Pierre Hadot) and subsequently to the Collège de France (1991).

He has worked mainly on Manichaeism and Gnosticism, on currents related to these in Zoroastrianism. Tardieu has published on Nag Hammadi and other major 20th-century discoveries of texts in Egypt and the wider Near East.

A theory of Tardieu's, which has remained far from securing unanimous adhesion, developed in his work, Les paysages reliques (1990), concerns a hypothetical removal by Simplicius of Cilicia and other Athenian Neoplatonic writers after the closure of the Schools by Justinian (529) to Harran (or Carrhae) in Mesopotamia.

== Selected bibliography ==
=== Books ===
- Trois mythes gnostiques. Adam, Éros et les animaux d'Égypte dans un écrit de Nag Hammadi (II, 5), éd. Brepols, 1974
- Le manichéisme, coll. Que sais-je?, n°1940, éd. P.U.F., 1997 (éd. orig. 1981) (translated into English by M. B. DeBevoise in 2009 and published by the University of Illinois Press)
- Écrits gnostiques. Codex de Berlin, éd. Cerf, 1984
- Introduction à la littérature gnostique, I. Collections retrouvées avant 1945, in collaboration with J.-D. Dubois, éd.Cerf/CNRS, 1986
- Études manichéennes. Bibliographie critique 1977-1986, éd. Institut Français de Recherche en Iran, 1988
- Les paysages reliques. Routes et haltes syriennes d'Isidore à Simplicius, éd. Vrin, 1990
- Recherches sur la formation de l'Apocalypse de Zostrien et les sources de Marius Victorinus, coll. Res Orientales, IX, éd. Vrin, 1996

=== Editions and series ===
- H. Lewy, Chaldæan Oracles and Theurgy. Mysticism, Magic, and Platonism in the Later Roman Empire, Nouvelle édition par M. Tardieu, éd. Brepols, 1978
- Michel Tardieu, Les Règles de l'interprétation, éd. Cerf, 1987
- Michel Tardieu, La Formation des canons scripturaires, éd. Cerf, 1993
- B. Lauret et M. Tardieu (éd.), A. v. Harnack. Marcion. L’évangile du Dieu étranger. Une monographie sur l’histoire de la fondation de l’Église catholique, trad. B. Lauret et suivi de contributions de B. Lauret, G. Monnot et É. Poulat, avec un essai de M. Tardieu, éd. Cerf, 2005 (éd. orig. 2003)

=== Articles ===
- Michel Tardieu (2008). "Les Chrétiens d'Orient dans l'œuvre de Paul Pelliot". Comptes rendus des séances de l'Académie des Inscriptions et Belles-Lettres. 152 (3): 1141–1157. doi:10.3406/crai.2008.92335.
- Michel Tardieu, Les Gnostiques dans la Vie de Plotin, in: L. Brisson et al. (éd.), Porphyre. La Vie de Plotin (vol. II), éd. Vrin 1992, pp. 503-563.
