= La Rochebeaucourt-et-Argentine =

- Commune
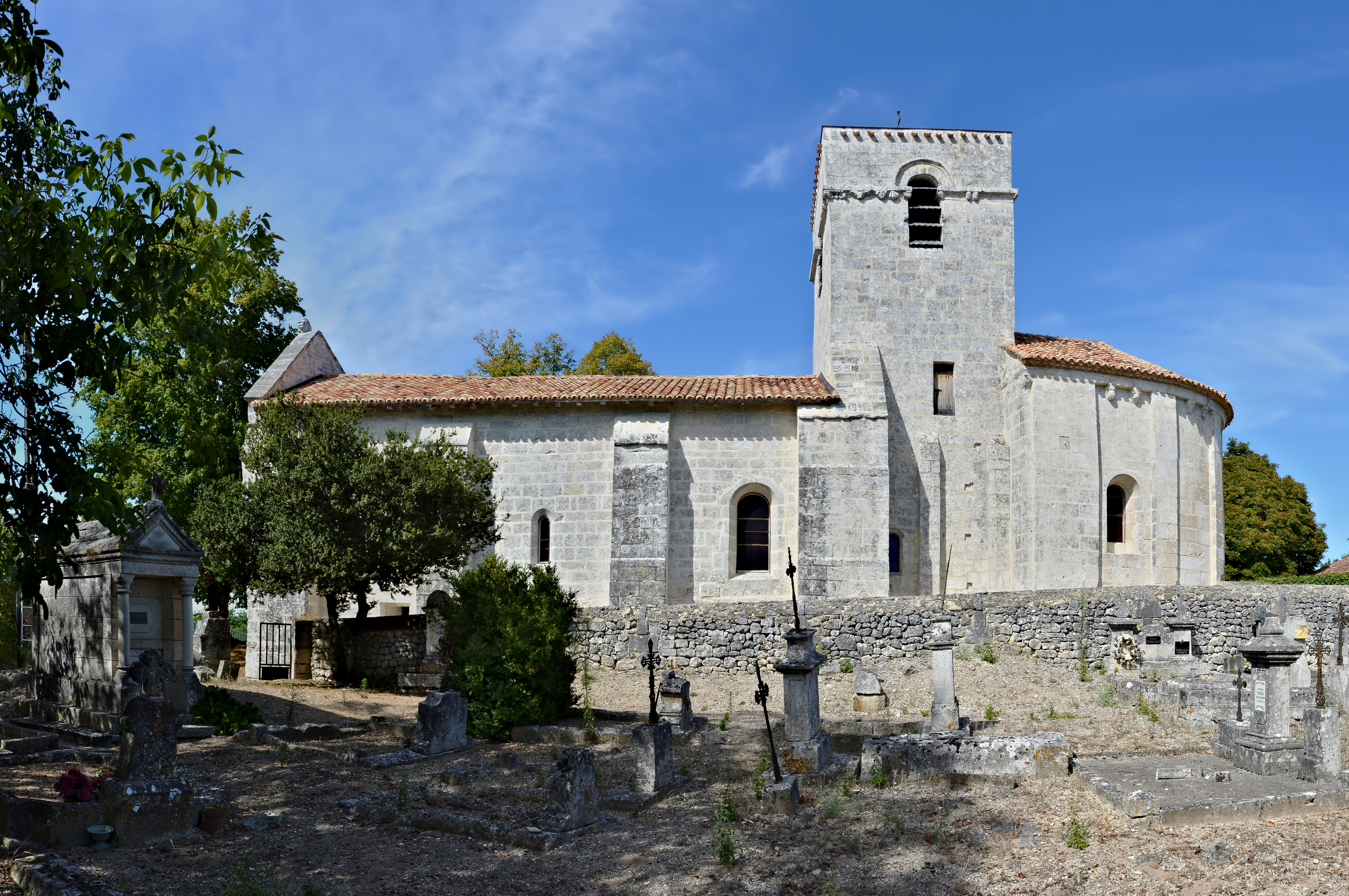
- The church in Argentine

- Coat of arms
- Location of La Rochebeaucourt-et-Argentine
- Location within France Location within Nouvelle-Aquitaine
- Coordinates: 45°29′04″N 0°22′51″E
- Country: France
- Region: Nouvelle-Aquitaine
- Department: Dordogne
- Arrondissement: Nontron
- Canton: Brantôme en Périgord

Government
  - Mayor (2020–2026): Michel Bosdevesy
- Area^{1}: 17.31 km^{2} (6.68 sq mi)
- Elevation: 93 m (305 ft)
- Highest elevation: 183 m (600 ft)
- Lowest elevation: 85 m (279 ft)
- Population (2023): 331
  - Density: 19.1/km^{2} (49.5/sq mi)
- Time zone: UTC+01:00 (CET)
  - Summer (DST): UTC+02:00 (CEST)
- INSEE/Postal code: 24353 /24340
- ^{1} French Land Register data, which excludes lakes, ponds, glaciers > 1 km^{2} (0.386 sq mi or 247 acres) and river estuaries.

La Rochebeaucourt-et-Argentine (French pronunciation: [la ʁɔʃbokuʁ e aʁʒɑ̃tin]; Occitan: La Ròcha Beucort e Argentina) is a commune in the Dordogne department in Nouvelle-Aquitaine in southwestern France.

== Geography ==
The Lizonne (locally called Nizonne) forms the commune's northwestern border.

== Population ==
Historical population
Year	Pop.	±% p.a.
1968	459	—
1975	408	−1.67%
1982	411	+0.10%
1990	424	+0.39%
1999	396	−0.76%
2007	398	+0.06%
2012	349	−2.59%
2017	322	−1.60%
2023	331	+0.46%
Source: INSEE

== See also ==
- Communes of the Dordogne department
