= Salles-Lavalette =

- Commune
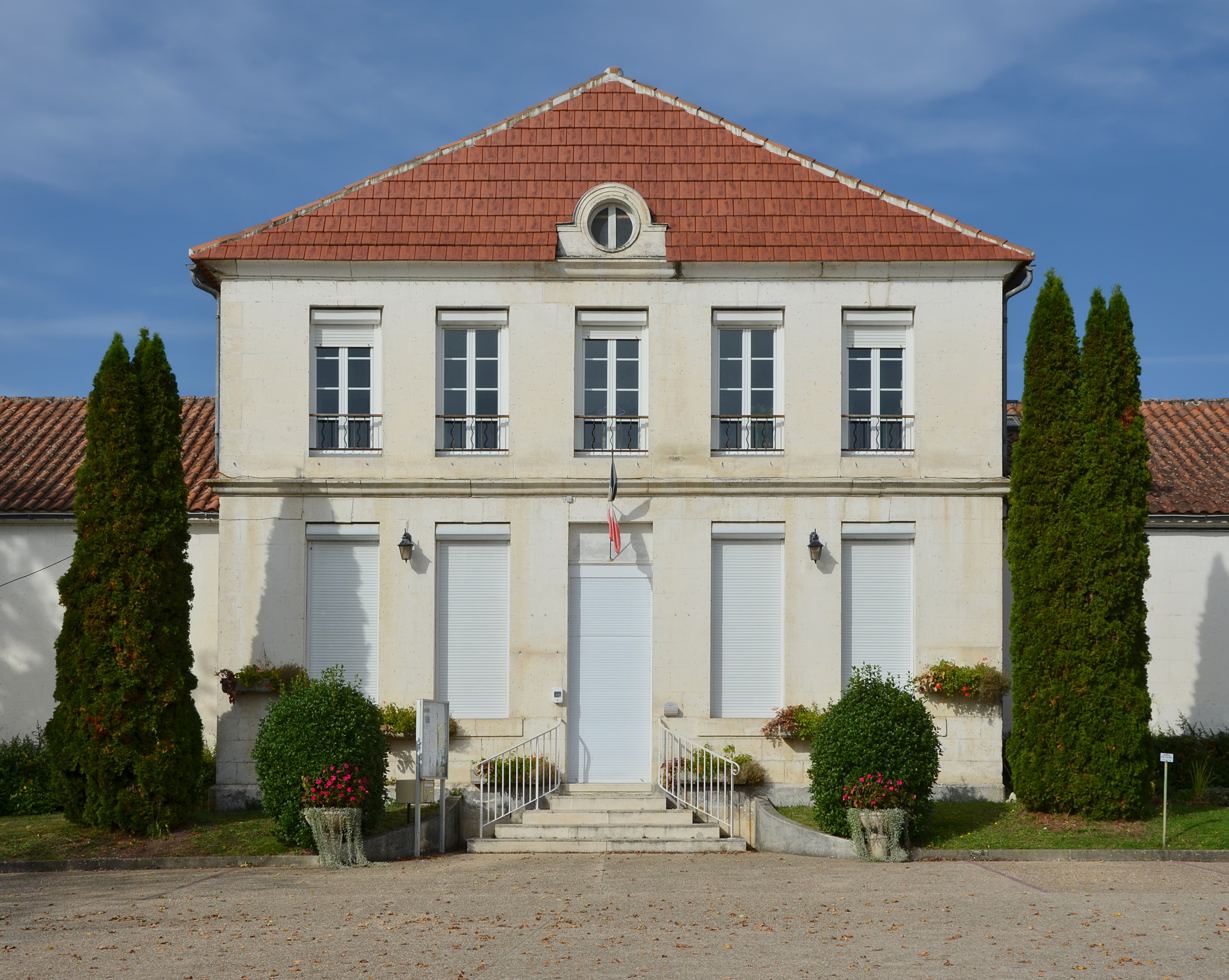
- Town hall
- Location of Salles-Lavalette
- Location within France Location within Nouvelle-Aquitaine
- Coordinates: 45°23′03″N 0°14′07″E
- Country: France
- Region: Nouvelle-Aquitaine
- Department: Charente
- Arrondissement: Angoulême
- Canton: Tude-et-Lavalette

Government
  - Mayor (2020–2026): Carine Daulon
- Area^{1}: 20.15 km^{2} (7.78 sq mi)
- Elevation: 75 m (246 ft)
- Highest elevation: 191 m (627 ft)
- Lowest elevation: 65 m (213 ft)
- Population (2023): 317
  - Density: 15.7/km^{2} (40.7/sq mi)
- Time zone: UTC+01:00 (CET)
  - Summer (DST): UTC+02:00 (CEST)
- INSEE/Postal code: 16362 /16190
- ^{1} French Land Register data, which excludes lakes, ponds, glaciers > 1 km^{2} (0.386 sq mi or 247 acres) and river estuaries.

Salles-Lavalette (French pronunciation: [sal lavalɛt]; Occitan: Salas La Valeta) is a commune in the Charente department in southwestern France.

== Geography ==
The Lizonne forms the commune's eastern border.

== Population ==
Historical population
Year	Pop.	±% p.a.
1968	503	—
1975	385	−3.75%
1982	362	−0.88%
1990	365	+0.10%
1999	360	−0.15%
2007	341	−0.68%
2012	368	+1.54%
2017	352	−0.89%
2023	317	−1.73%
Source: INSEE

== See also ==
- Communes of the Charente department
