= Saint-Séverin =

- Commune
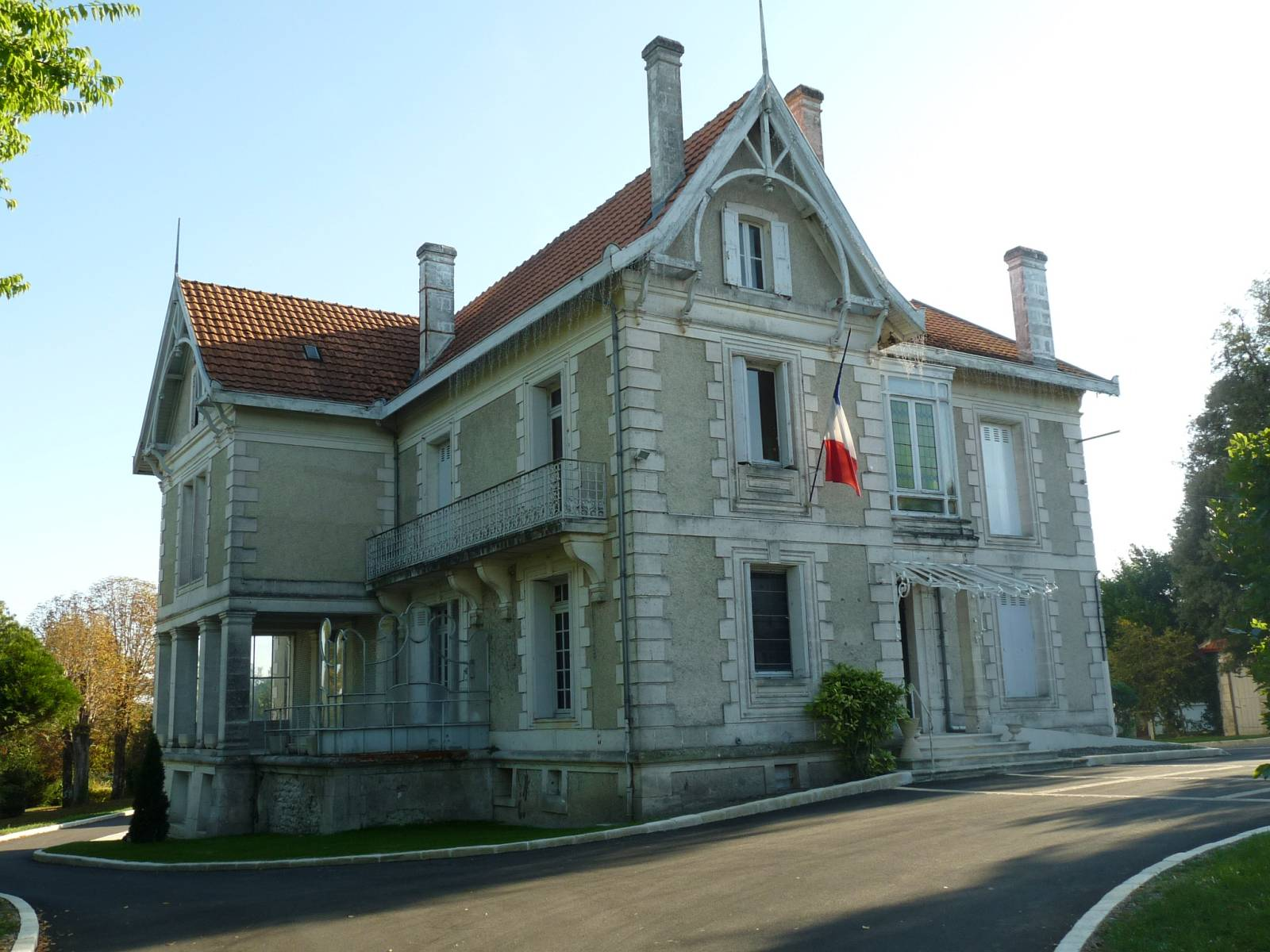
- The town hall in Saint-Séverin

- Coat of arms
- Location of Saint-Séverin
- Location within France Location within Nouvelle-Aquitaine
- Coordinates: 45°18′50″N 0°15′16″E
- Country: France
- Region: Nouvelle-Aquitaine
- Department: Charente
- Arrondissement: Angoulême
- Canton: Tude-et-Lavalette

Government
  - Mayor (2020–2026): Patrick Gallès
- Area^{1}: 14.93 km^{2} (5.76 sq mi)
- Elevation: 108 m (354 ft)
- Highest elevation: 134 m (440 ft)
- Lowest elevation: 45 m (148 ft)
- Population (2023): 784
  - Density: 52.5/km^{2} (136/sq mi)
- Time zone: UTC+01:00 (CET)
  - Summer (DST): UTC+02:00 (CEST)
- INSEE/Postal code: 16350 /16390
- ^{1} French Land Register data, which excludes lakes, ponds, glaciers > 1 km^{2} (0.386 sq mi or 247 acres) and river estuaries.

Saint-Séverin (French pronunciation: [sɛ̃ sevʁɛ̃]; Occitan: Sent Severin) is a commune in the Charente department in southwestern France.

== Geography ==
The river Lizonne forms the commune's eastern border, then flows into the Dronne, which forms the commune's southern border.

== Population ==
Historical population
| Year | Pop. | ±% p.a. |
|---|---|---|
| 1968 | 824 | — |
| 1975 | 721 | −1.89% |
| 1982 | 741 | +0.39% |
| 1990 | 777 | +0.59% |
| 1999 | 731 | −0.68% |
| 2007 | 781 | +0.83% |
| 2012 | 769 | −0.31% |
| 2017 | 774 | +0.13% |
| 2023 | 784 | +0.21% |
Source: INSEE

== See also ==
- Communes of the Charente department
