= Gurat =

- Commune
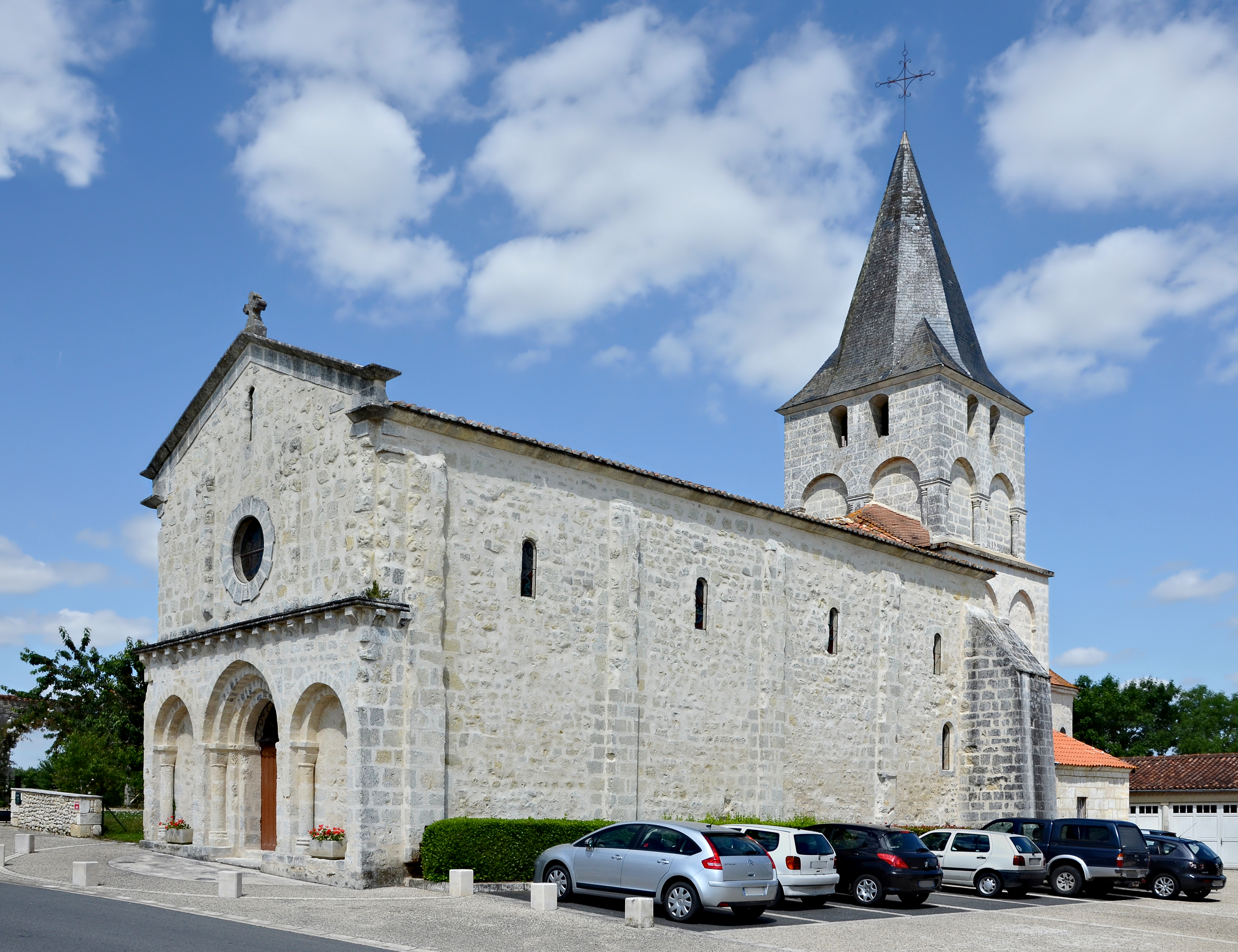
- Church and village car-park
- Location of Gurat
- Location within France Location within Nouvelle-Aquitaine
- Coordinates: 45°25′49″N 0°16′13″E
- Country: France
- Region: Nouvelle-Aquitaine
- Department: Charente
- Arrondissement: Angoulême
- Canton: Tude-et-Lavalette
- Intercommunality: Lavalette Tude Dronne

Government
  - Mayor (2020–2026): Bénédicte Goreau
- Area^{1}: 16.03 km^{2} (6.19 sq mi)
- Elevation: 87 m (285 ft)
- Highest elevation: 197 m (646 ft)
- Lowest elevation: 72 m (236 ft)
- Population (2023): 186
  - Density: 11.6/km^{2} (30.1/sq mi)
- Time zone: UTC+01:00 (CET)
  - Summer (DST): UTC+02:00 (CEST)
- INSEE/Postal code: 16162 /16320
- ^{1} French Land Register data, which excludes lakes, ponds, glaciers > 1 km^{2} (0.386 sq mi or 247 acres) and river estuaries.

Gurat (French pronunciation: [ɡyʁa]; Occitan: Gurac) is a commune in the Charente department in southwestern France.

== Geography ==
The Lizonne forms the commune's southeastern border.

== Population ==
Historical population
Year	Pop.	±% p.a.
1968	261	—
1975	216	−2.67%
1982	234	+1.15%
1990	210	−1.34%
1999	184	−1.46%
2007	187	+0.20%
2012	182	−0.54%
2017	180	−0.22%
2023	186	+0.55%
Source: INSEE

== See also ==
- Communes of the Charente department
