= Palluaud =

- Commune
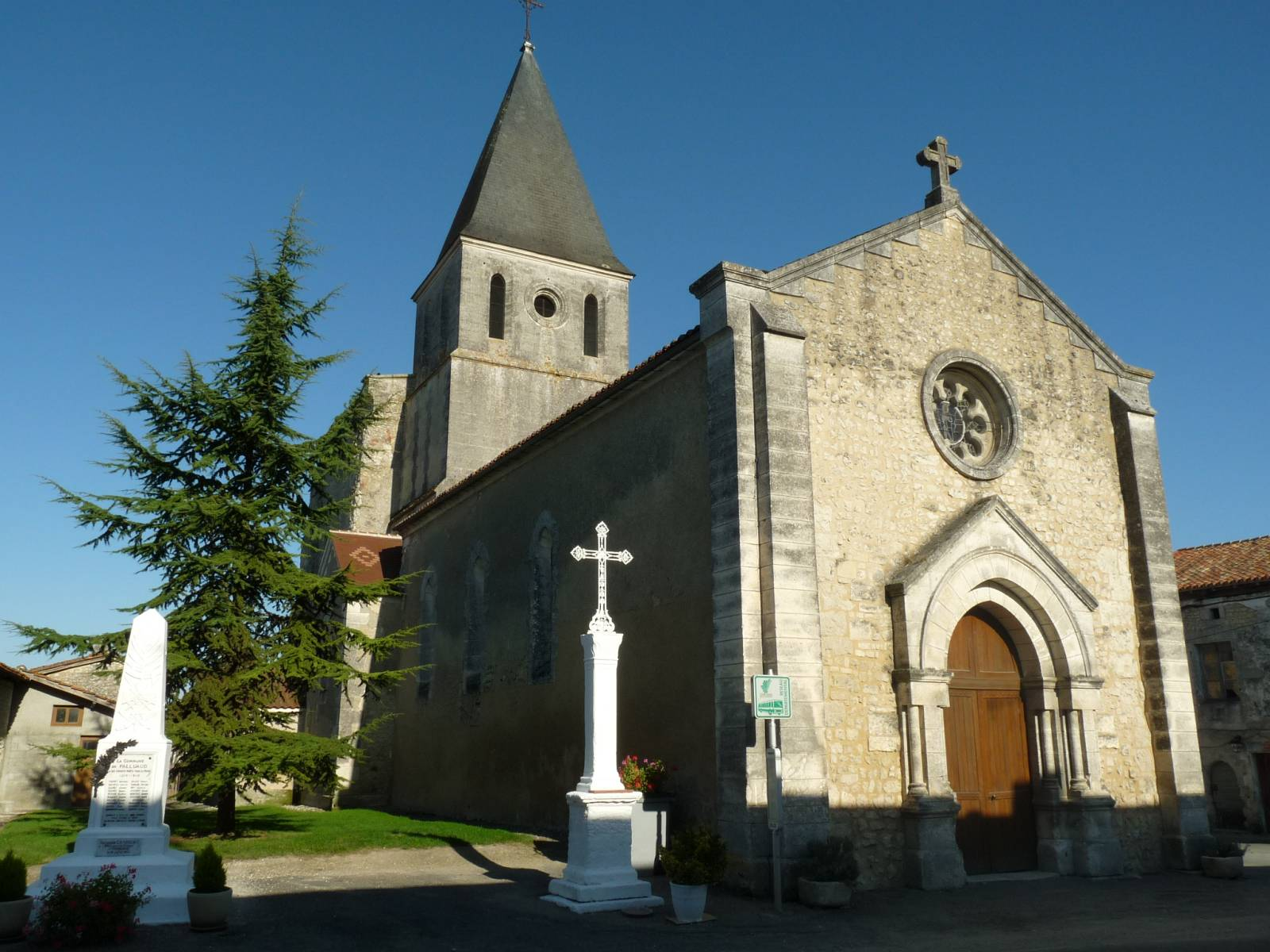
- The church in Palluaud
- Location of Palluaud
- Location within France Location within Nouvelle-Aquitaine
- Coordinates: 45°20′57″N 0°14′57″E
- Country: France
- Region: Nouvelle-Aquitaine
- Department: Charente
- Arrondissement: Angoulême
- Canton: Tude-et-Lavalette

Government
  - Mayor (2020–2026): Michel Andreu
- Area^{1}: 8.57 km^{2} (3.31 sq mi)
- Elevation: 50 m (160 ft)
- Highest elevation: 191 m (627 ft)
- Lowest elevation: 57 m (187 ft)
- Population (2023): 215
  - Density: 25.1/km^{2} (65.0/sq mi)
- Time zone: UTC+01:00 (CET)
  - Summer (DST): UTC+02:00 (CEST)
- INSEE/Postal code: 16254 /16390
- ^{1} French Land Register data, which excludes lakes, ponds, glaciers > 1 km^{2} (0.386 sq mi or 247 acres) and river estuaries.

Palluaud (French pronunciation: [palɥo]) is a commune in the Charente department in southwestern France.

== Geography ==
The Lizonne forms the commune's eastern border.

== Population ==
Historical population
Year	Pop.	±% p.a.
1968	264	—
1975	260	−0.22%
1982	273	+0.70%
1990	283	+0.45%
1999	290	+0.27%
2007	287	−0.13%
2012	241	−3.43%
2017	228	−1.10%
2023	215	−0.97%
Source: INSEE

== See also ==
- Communes of the Charente department
