= Nanteuil-Auriac-de-Bourzac =

- Commune
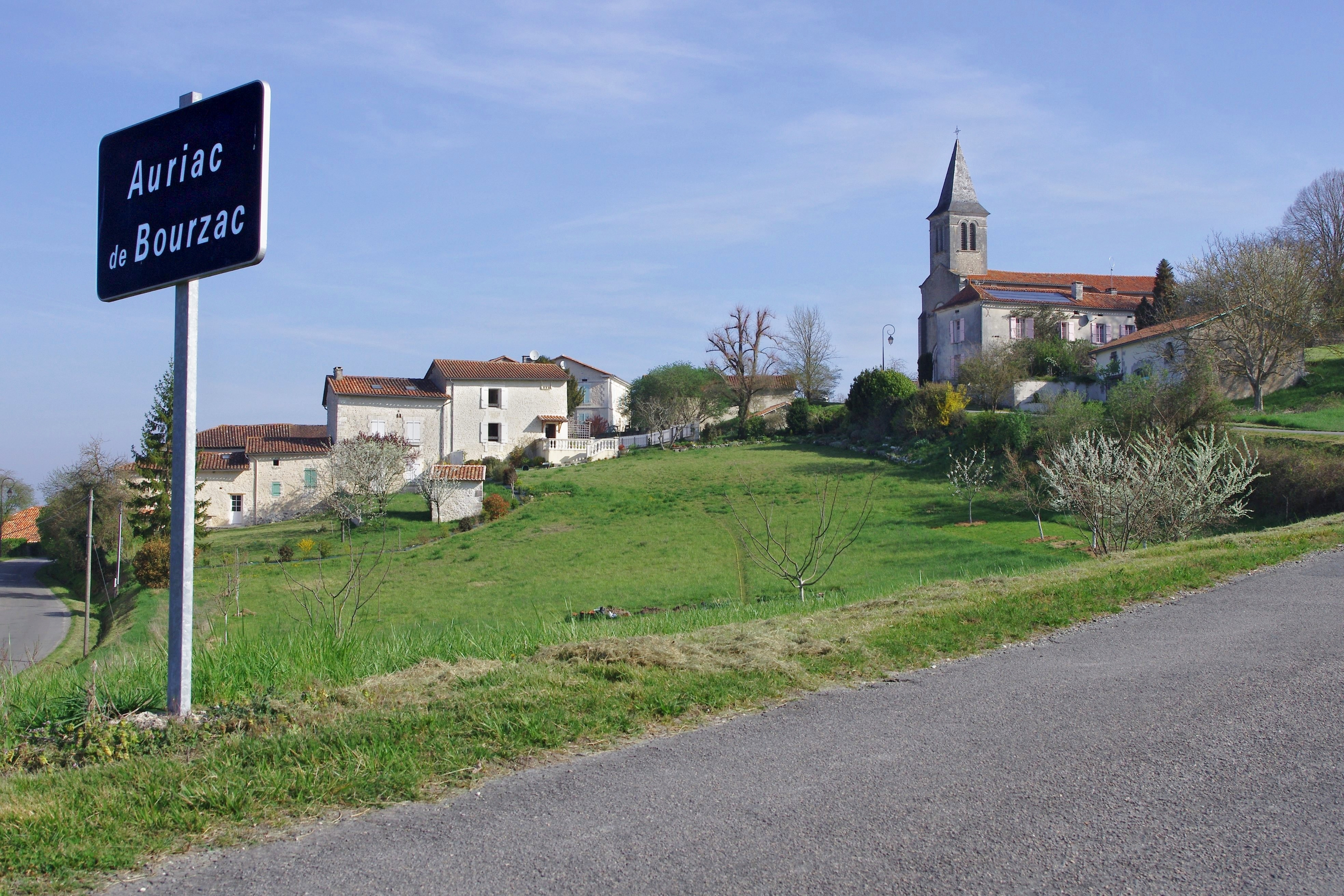
- A general view of Auriac-de-Bourzac
- Location of Nanteuil-Auriac-de-Bourzac
- Location within France Location within Nouvelle-Aquitaine
- Coordinates: 45°23′07″N 0°17′29″E
- Country: France
- Region: Nouvelle-Aquitaine
- Department: Dordogne
- Arrondissement: Périgueux
- Canton: Ribérac

Government
  - Mayor (2020–2026): Sophie Gendron
- Area^{1}: 20.92 km^{2} (8.08 sq mi)
- Elevation: 90 m (300 ft)
- Highest elevation: 180 m (590 ft)
- Lowest elevation: 61 m (200 ft)
- Population (2023): 234
  - Density: 11.2/km^{2} (29.0/sq mi)
- Time zone: UTC+01:00 (CET)
  - Summer (DST): UTC+02:00 (CEST)
- INSEE/Postal code: 24303 /24320
- ^{1} French Land Register data, which excludes lakes, ponds, glaciers > 1 km^{2} (0.386 sq mi or 247 acres) and river estuaries.

Nanteuil-Auriac-de-Bourzac (French pronunciation: [nɑ̃tœj oʁjak də buʁzak]; Occitan: Nantuelh e Auriac de Borzac) is a commune in the Dordogne department in Nouvelle-Aquitaine in southwestern France. It was created in 1973 by the merger of two former communes: Nanteuil-de-Bourzac and Auriac-de-Bourzac.

== Geography ==
The Lizonne forms the commune's western border.

== Population ==
Historical population
Year	Pop.	±% p.a.
1968	412	—
1975	384	−1.00%
1982	311	−2.97%
1990	275	−1.53%
1999	252	−0.97%
2007	284	+1.51%
2012	209	−5.95%
2017	224	+1.40%
2023	234	+0.73%
Source: INSEE

== See also ==
- Communes of the Dordogne department
