= Édon =

- Commune
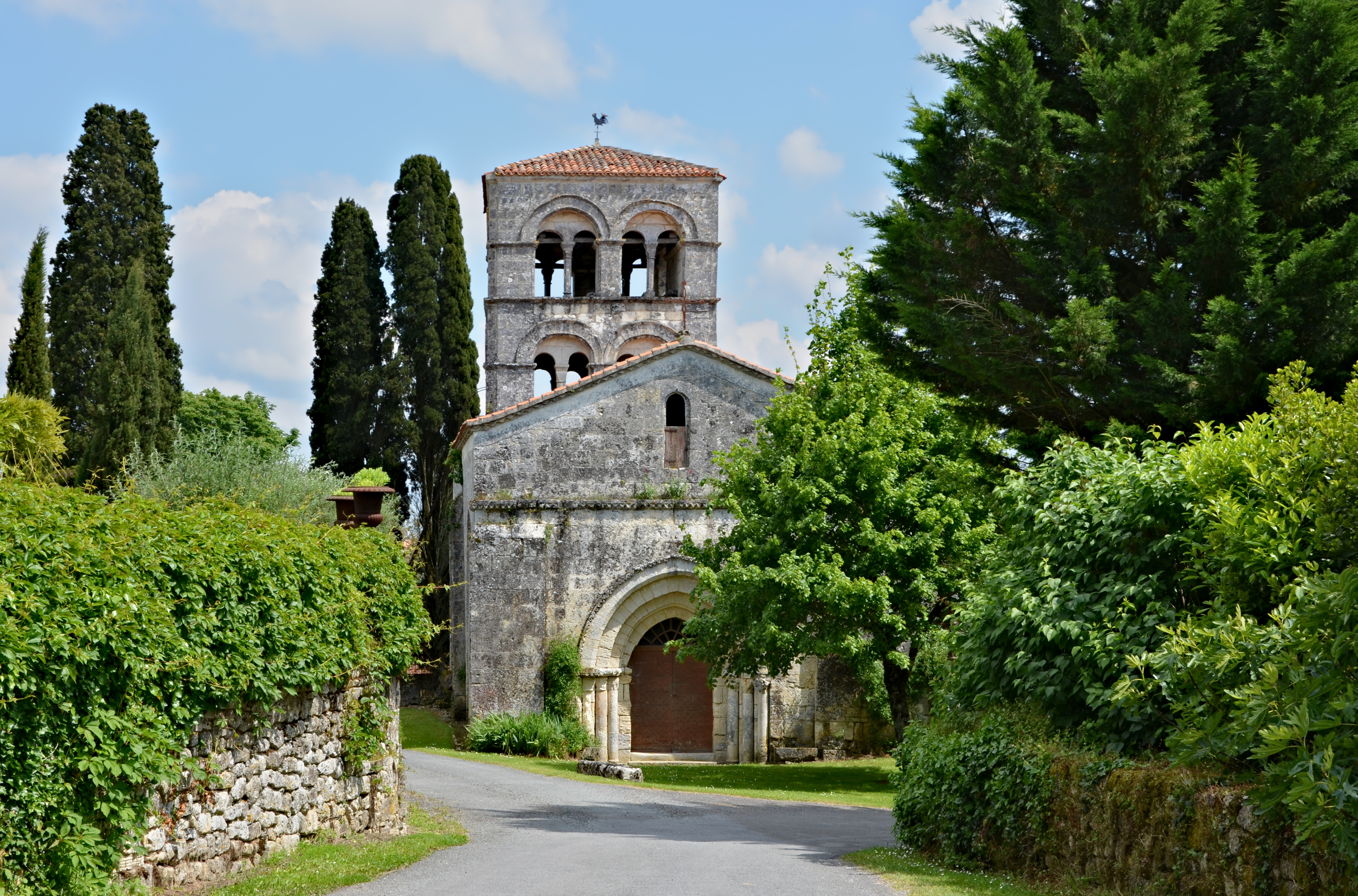
- The church in Édon
- Location of Édon
- Location within France Location within Nouvelle-Aquitaine
- Coordinates: 45°29′22″N 0°21′18″E
- Country: France
- Region: Nouvelle-Aquitaine
- Department: Charente
- Arrondissement: Angoulême
- Canton: Tude-et-Lavalette

Government
  - Mayor (2020–2026): Patrice Petit
- Area^{1}: 16.49 km^{2} (6.37 sq mi)
- Elevation: 153 m (502 ft)
- Highest elevation: 227 m (745 ft)
- Lowest elevation: 85 m (279 ft)
- Population (2023): 272
  - Density: 16.5/km^{2} (42.7/sq mi)
- Time zone: UTC+01:00 (CET)
  - Summer (DST): UTC+02:00 (CEST)
- INSEE/Postal code: 16125 /16320
- ^{1} French Land Register data, which excludes lakes, ponds, glaciers > 1 km^{2} (0.386 sq mi or 247 acres) and river estuaries.

Édon (French pronunciation: [edɔ̃]; Occitan: Aidon) is a commune in the Charente department in southwestern France.

== Geography ==
The Lizonne (locally called Nizonne) forms the commune's southeastern border.

== Population ==
Historical population
Year	Pop.	±% p.a.
1968	284	—
1975	256	−1.47%
1982	286	+1.60%
1990	306	+0.85%
1999	224	−3.41%
2007	246	+1.18%
2012	258	+0.96%
2017	252	−0.47%
2023	272	+1.28%
Source: INSEE

== See also ==
- Communes of the Charente department
