= Bouteilles-Saint-Sébastien =

- Commune
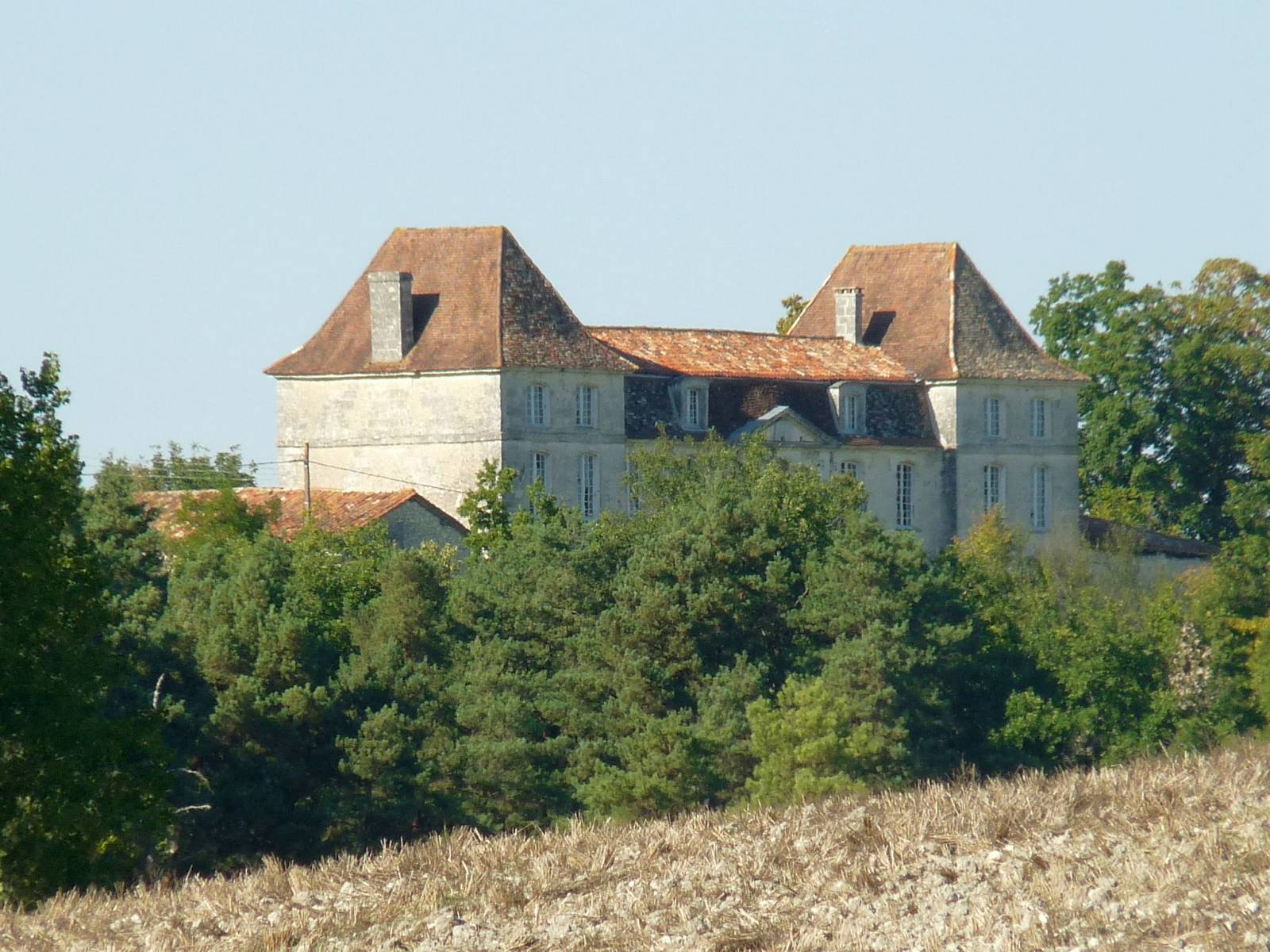
- Chateau of Bouteilles
- Location of Bouteilles-Saint-Sébastien
- Location within France Location within Nouvelle-Aquitaine
- Coordinates: 45°20′45″N 0°18′19″E
- Country: France
- Region: Nouvelle-Aquitaine
- Department: Dordogne
- Arrondissement: Périgueux
- Canton: Ribérac

Government
  - Mayor (2020–2026): Christine Berthé
- Area^{1}: 13.96 km^{2} (5.39 sq mi)
- Elevation: 100 m (330 ft)
- Highest elevation: 183 m (600 ft)
- Lowest elevation: 58 m (190 ft)
- Population (2023): 172
  - Density: 12.3/km^{2} (31.9/sq mi)
- Time zone: UTC+01:00 (CET)
  - Summer (DST): UTC+02:00 (CEST)
- INSEE/Postal code: 24062 /24320
- ^{1} French Land Register data, which excludes lakes, ponds, glaciers > 1 km^{2} (0.386 sq mi or 247 acres) and river estuaries.

Bouteilles-Saint-Sébastien (French pronunciation: [butɛj sɛ̃ sebastjɛ̃]; Occitan: Botelha e Sent Sabàstian) is a commune in the Dordogne department in southwestern France.

== Geography ==
The Lizonne forms the commune's southwestern border.

== Population ==
Historical population
Year	Pop.	±% p.a.
1968	294	—
1975	250	−2.29%
1982	218	−1.94%
1990	214	−0.23%
1999	189	−1.37%
2007	189	+0.00%
2012	181	−0.86%
2017	174	−0.79%
2023	172	−0.19%
Source: INSEE

== See also ==
- Communes of the Dordogne département
