= Sainte-Croix-de-Mareuil =

- Commune
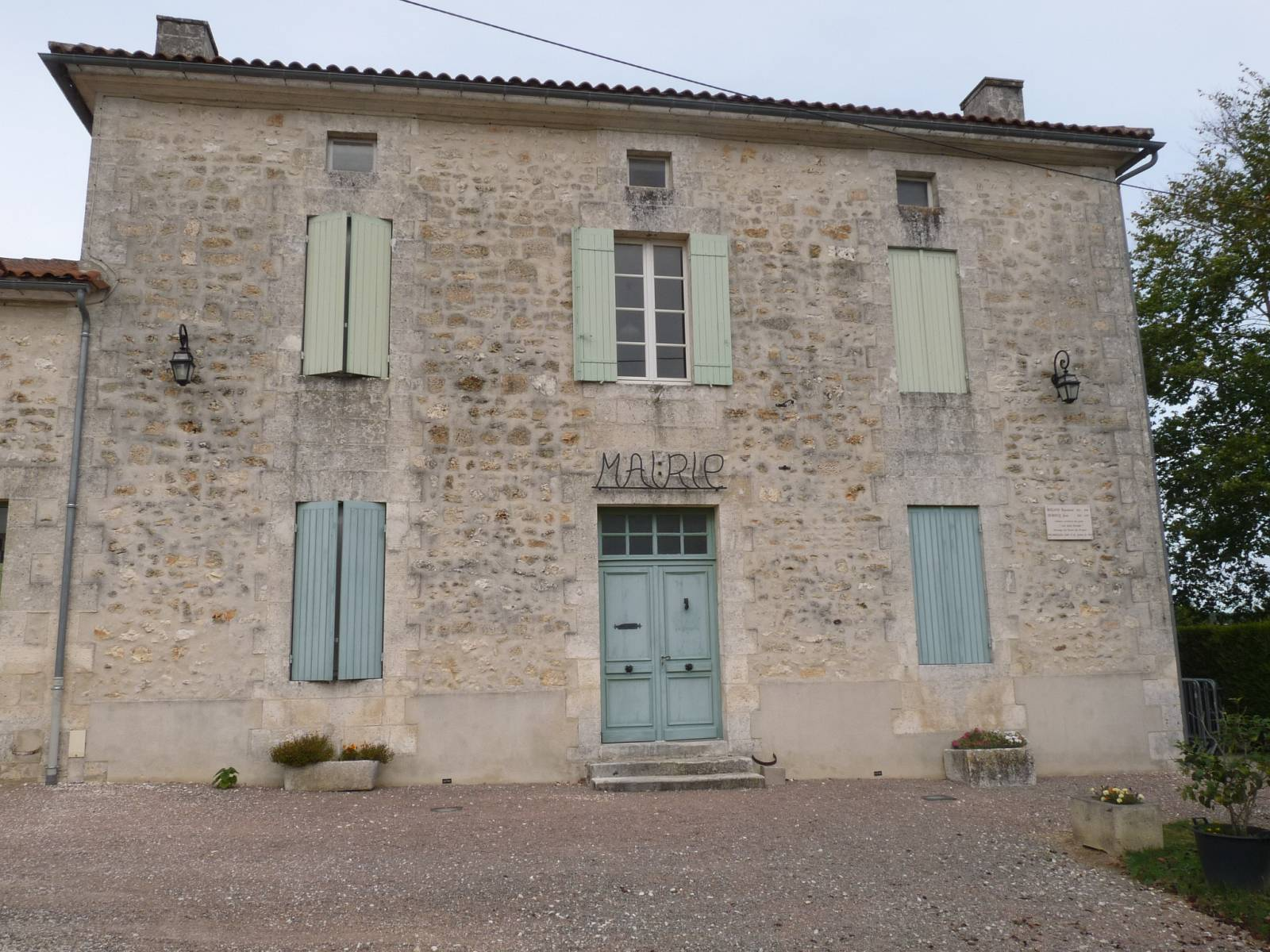
- The town hall in Sainte-Croix-de-Mareuil

- Coat of arms
- Location of Sainte-Croix-de-Mareuil
- Location within France Location within Nouvelle-Aquitaine
- Coordinates: 45°27′46″N 0°25′34″E
- Country: France
- Region: Nouvelle-Aquitaine
- Department: Dordogne
- Arrondissement: Nontron
- Canton: Brantôme en Périgord

Government
  - Mayor (2020–2026): Josiane Boyer
- Area^{1}: 11.93 km^{2} (4.61 sq mi)
- Elevation: 120 m (390 ft)
- Highest elevation: 192 m (630 ft)
- Lowest elevation: 95 m (312 ft)
- Population (2023): 144
  - Density: 12.1/km^{2} (31.3/sq mi)
- Time zone: UTC+01:00 (CET)
  - Summer (DST): UTC+02:00 (CEST)
- INSEE/Postal code: 24394 /24340
- ^{1} French Land Register data, which excludes lakes, ponds, glaciers > 1 km^{2} (0.386 sq mi or 247 acres) and river estuaries.

Sainte-Croix-de-Mareuil (French pronunciation: [sɛ̃t kʁwa də maʁœj], literally Sainte-Croix of Mareuil; Limousin: Senta Crotz de Maruelh) is a commune in the Dordogne department in Nouvelle-Aquitaine in southwestern France.

== Population ==
Historical population
Year	Pop.	±% p.a.
1968	150	—
1975	153	+0.28%
1982	144	−0.86%
1990	142	−0.17%
1999	137	−0.40%
2007	133	−0.37%
2012	138	+0.74%
2017	150	+1.68%
2023	144	−0.68%
Source: INSEE

== Geography ==
The Lizonne forms part of the commune's northern border.

== See also ==
- Communes of the Dordogne department
