= Vaux-Lavalette =

- Commune
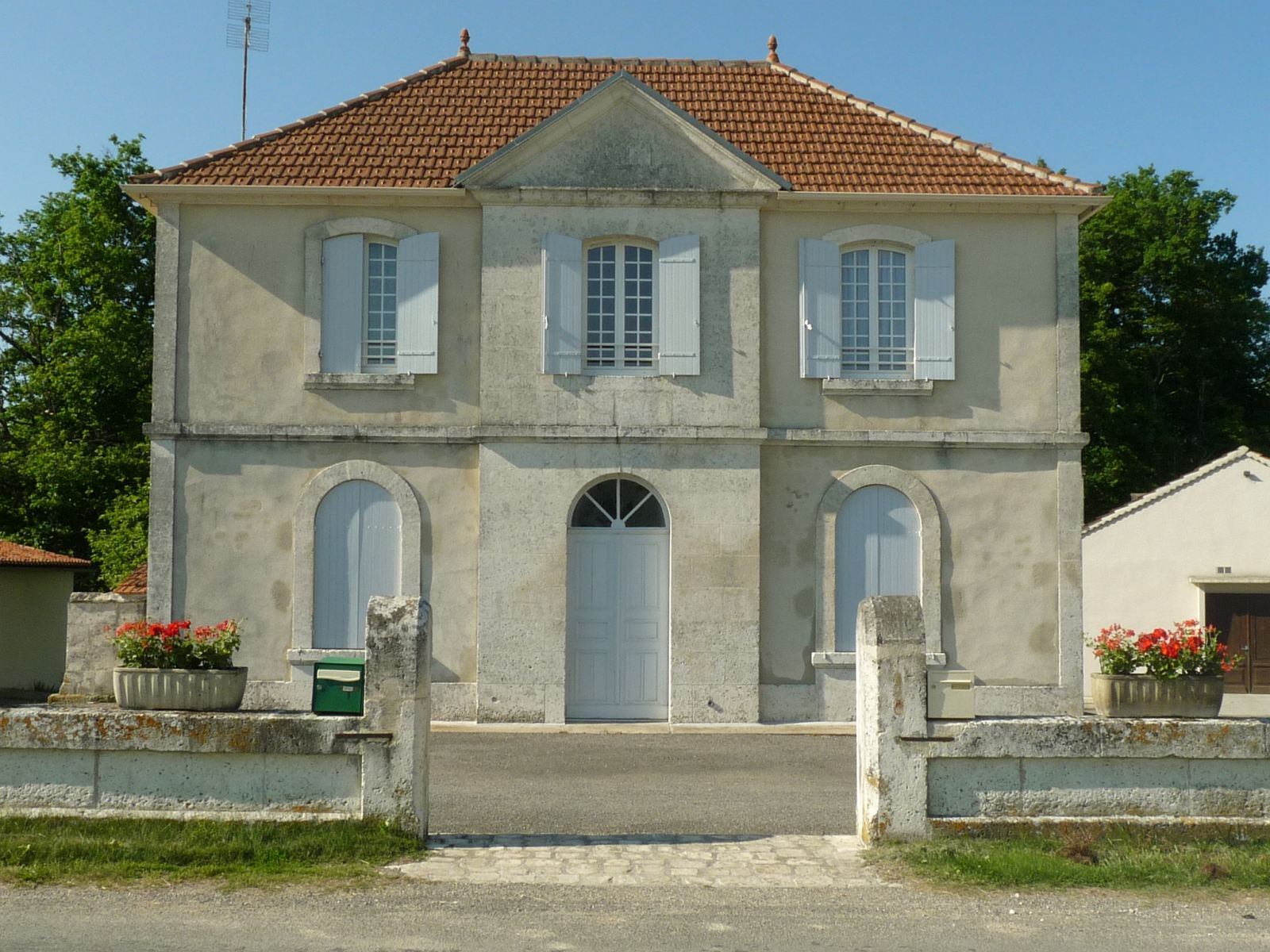
- Town hall
- Location of Vaux-Lavalette
- Location within France Location within Nouvelle-Aquitaine
- Coordinates: 45°25′18″N 0°14′04″E
- Country: France
- Region: Nouvelle-Aquitaine
- Department: Charente
- Arrondissement: Angoulême
- Canton: Tude-et-Lavalette

Government
  - Mayor (2022–2026): Pascale Bayonne
- Area^{1}: 6.78 km^{2} (2.62 sq mi)
- Elevation: 150 m (490 ft)
- Highest elevation: 188 m (617 ft)
- Lowest elevation: 72 m (236 ft)
- Population (2023): 79
  - Density: 12/km^{2} (30/sq mi)
- Time zone: UTC+01:00 (CET)
  - Summer (DST): UTC+02:00 (CEST)
- INSEE/Postal code: 16394 /16320
- ^{1} French Land Register data, which excludes lakes, ponds, glaciers > 1 km^{2} (0.386 sq mi or 247 acres) and river estuaries.

Vaux-Lavalette (French pronunciation: [vo lavalɛt]; Occitan: Vau) is a commune in the Charente department in southwestern France.

== Geography ==
The Lizonne forms the commune's eastern border.

== Population ==
Historical population
Year	Pop.	±% p.a.
1968	131	—
1975	96	−4.34%
1982	101	+0.73%
1990	106	+0.61%
1999	90	−1.80%
2007	92	+0.28%
2012	98	+1.27%
2017	93	−1.04%
2023	79	−2.68%
Source: INSEE

== See also ==
- Communes of the Charente department
