= Blanzaguet-Saint-Cybard =

- Commune
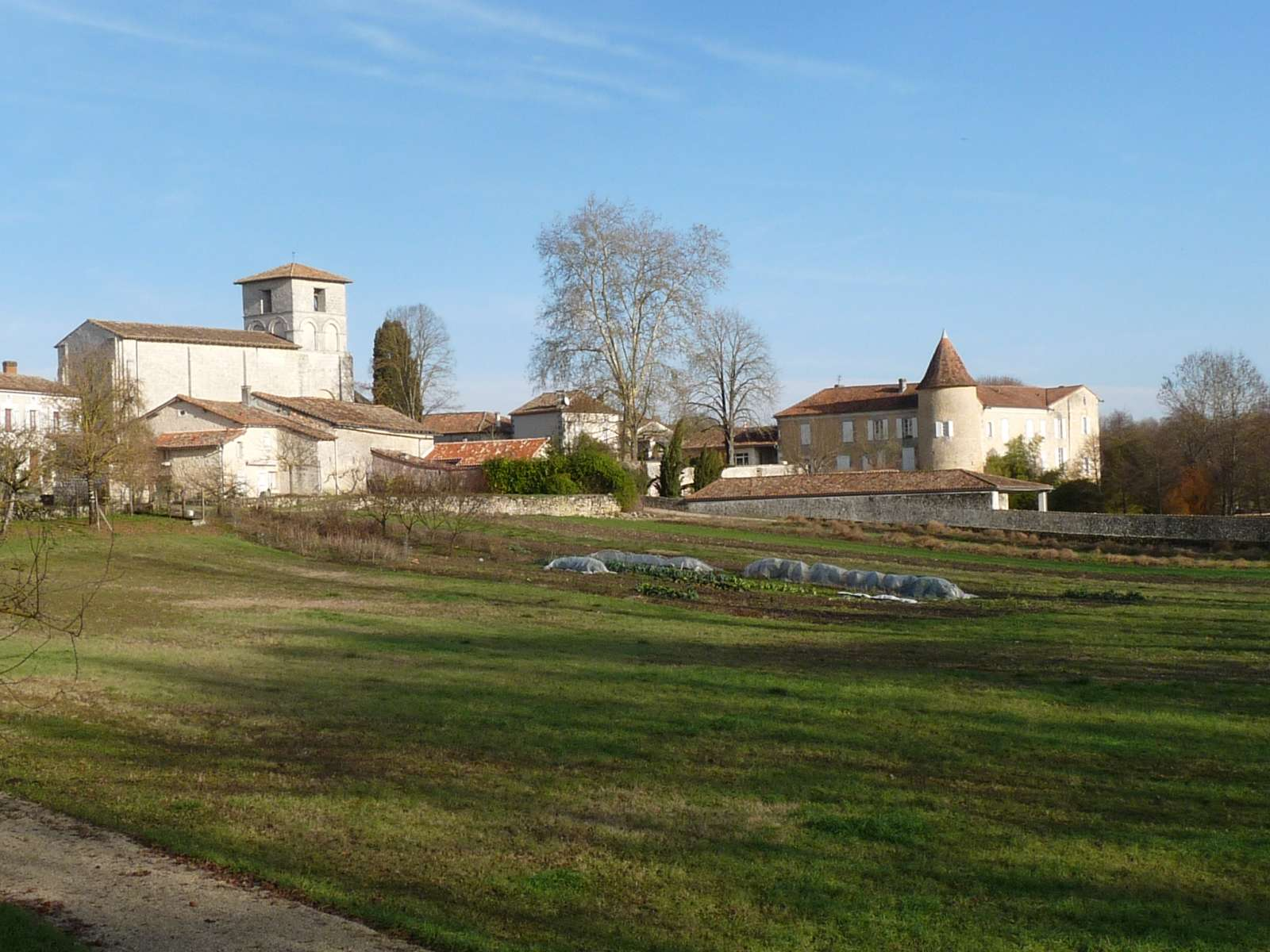
- A general view of Blanzaguet

- Coat of arms
- Location of Blanzaguet-Saint-Cybard
- Location within France Location within Nouvelle-Aquitaine
- Coordinates: 45°28′15″N 0°19′16″E
- Country: France
- Region: Nouvelle-Aquitaine
- Department: Charente
- Arrondissement: Angoulême
- Canton: Tude-et-Lavalette

Government
  - Mayor (2020–2026): Nathalie Selin
- Area^{1}: 11.95 km^{2} (4.61 sq mi)
- Elevation: 102 m (335 ft)
- Highest elevation: 162 m (531 ft)
- Lowest elevation: 82 m (269 ft)
- Population (2023): 270
  - Density: 23/km^{2} (59/sq mi)
- Time zone: UTC+01:00 (CET)
  - Summer (DST): UTC+02:00 (CEST)
- INSEE/Postal code: 16047 /16320
- ^{1} French Land Register data, which excludes lakes, ponds, glaciers > 1 km^{2} (0.386 sq mi or 247 acres) and river estuaries.

Blanzaguet-Saint-Cybard (French pronunciation: [blɑ̃zaɡɛ sɛ̃ sibaʁ]; Occitan: Blanzaguet e Sent Cibard) is a commune in the Charente department in southwestern France.

== Geography ==
The Lizonne forms part of the commune's southeastern border.

== Population ==
Historical population
| Year | Pop. | ±% p.a. |
|---|---|---|
| 1968 | 280 | — |
| 1975 | 255 | −1.33% |
| 1982 | 252 | −0.17% |
| 1990 | 223 | −1.52% |
| 1999 | 216 | −0.35% |
| 2007 | 237 | +1.17% |
| 2012 | 262 | +2.03% |
| 2017 | 296 | +2.47% |
| 2023 | 270 | −1.52% |
Source: INSEE

== See also ==
- Communes of the Charente department
