= Allemans =

- Commune
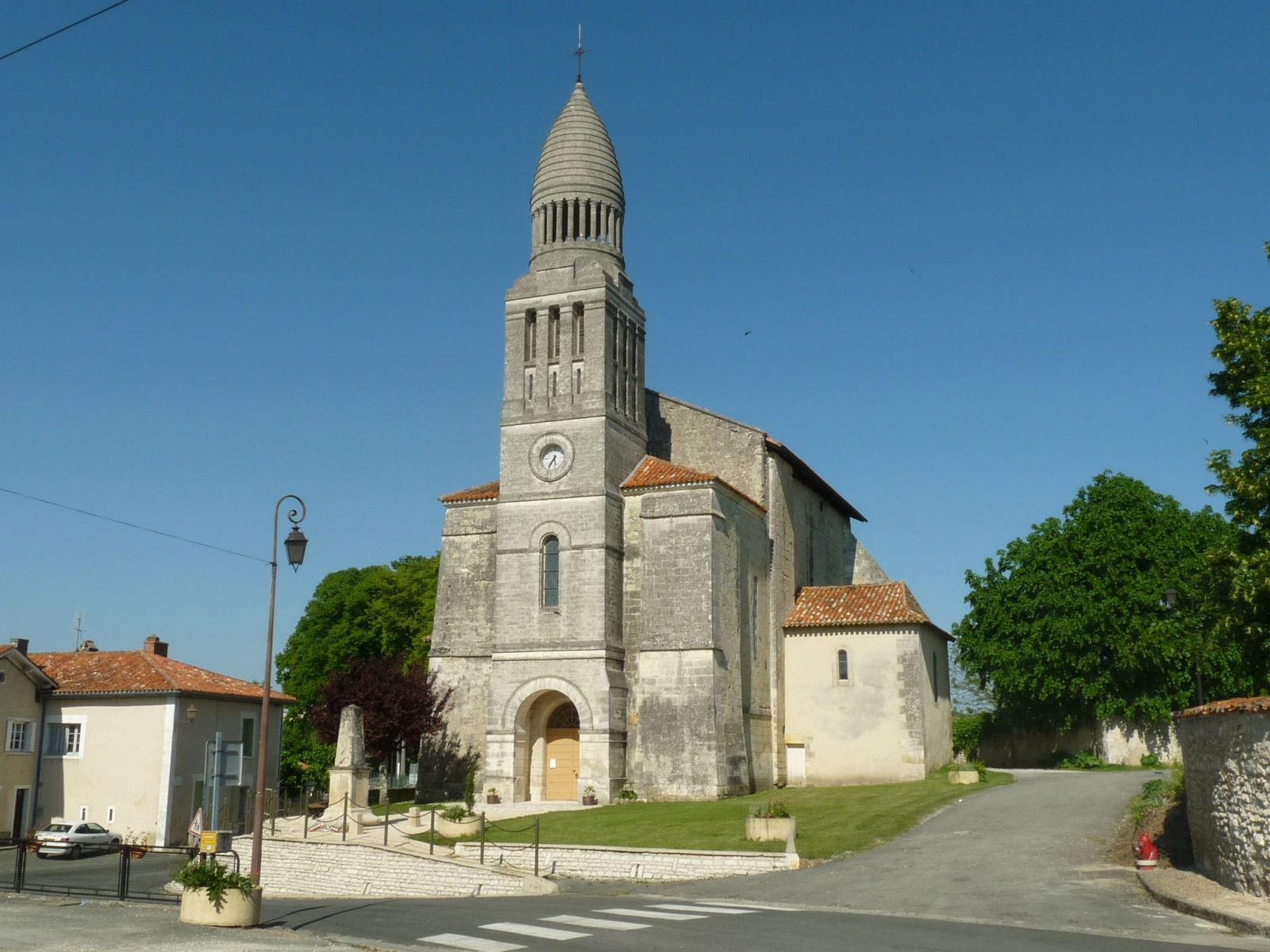
- Church of Allemans

- Coat of arms
- Location of Allemans
- Location within France Location within Nouvelle-Aquitaine
- Coordinates: 45°17′18″N 0°18′37″E
- Country: France
- Region: Nouvelle-Aquitaine
- Department: Dordogne
- Arrondissement: Périgueux
- Canton: Ribérac

Government
  - Mayor (2020–2026): Allain Tricoire
- Area^{1}: 18.75 km^{2} (7.24 sq mi)
- Elevation: 116 m (381 ft)
- Highest elevation: 167 m (548 ft)
- Lowest elevation: 47 m (154 ft)
- Population (2023): 544
  - Density: 29.0/km^{2} (75.1/sq mi)
- Time zone: UTC+01:00 (CET)
  - Summer (DST): UTC+02:00 (CEST)
- INSEE/Postal code: 24007 /24600
- ^{1} French Land Register data, which excludes lakes, ponds, glaciers > 1 km^{2} (0.386 sq mi or 247 acres) and river estuaries.

Allemans (French pronunciation: [almɑ̃]; Occitan: Alamans) is a commune in the Dordogne department in Nouvelle-Aquitaine in southwestern France.

== Geography ==
The river Sauvanie forms the commune's northern border, then flows into the Lizonne, which forms the commune's north-western border; then the Lizonne flows into the Dronne, which forms the commune's south-western and southern borders.

== Population ==
Historical population
Year	Pop.	±% p.a.
1968	519	—
1975	511	−0.22%
1982	506	−0.14%
1990	489	−0.43%
1999	540	+1.11%
2007	557	+0.39%
2012	577	+0.71%
2017	513	−2.32%
2023	544	+0.98%
Source: INSEE

== See also ==
- Communes of the Dordogne département
