= Les Graulges =

- Part of Mareuil en Périgord
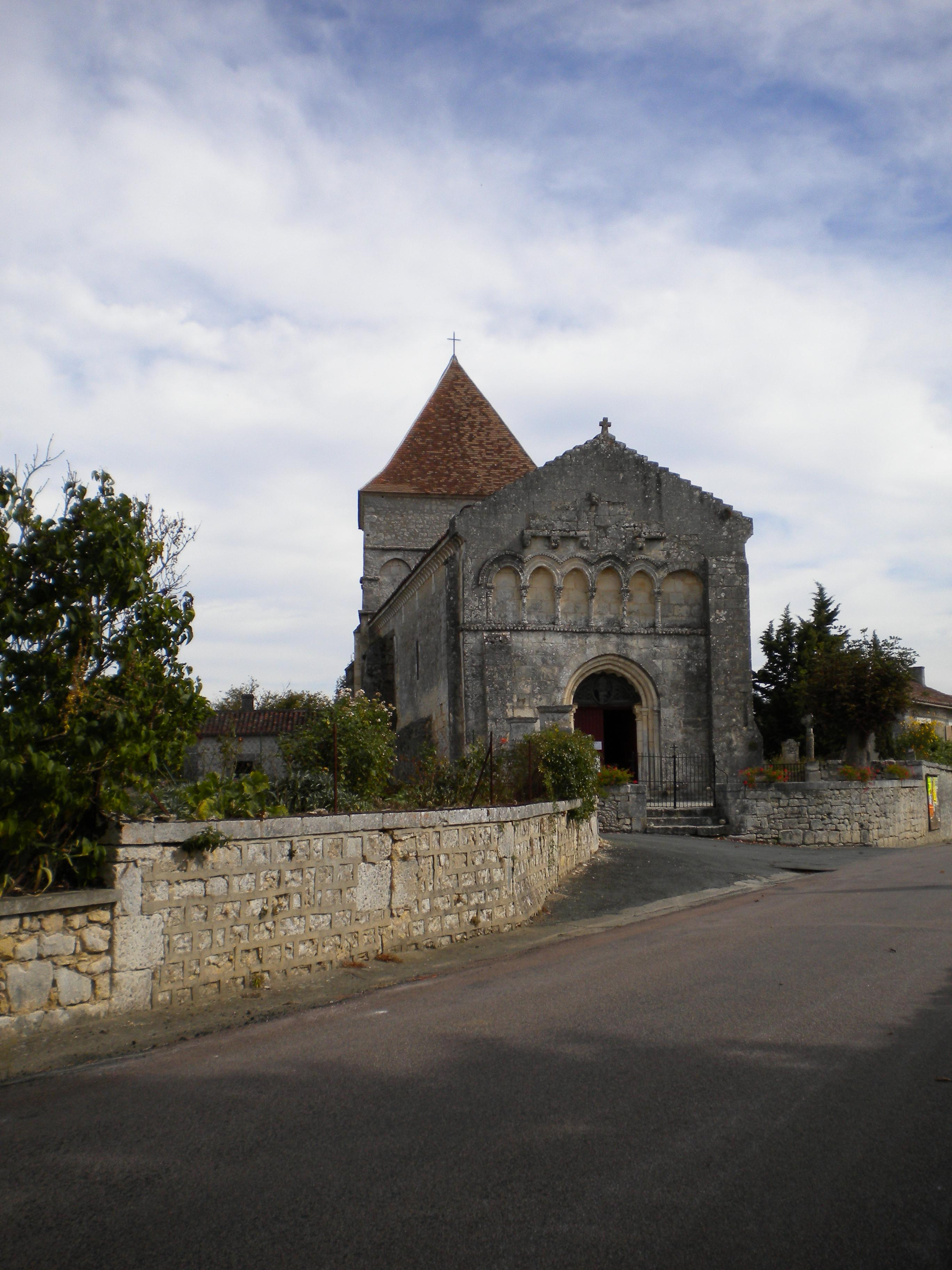
- Location of Les Graulges
- Location within France Location within Nouvelle-Aquitaine
- Coordinates: 45°29′46″N 0°26′34″E
- Country: France
- Region: Nouvelle-Aquitaine
- Department: Dordogne
- Arrondissement: Nontron
- Canton: Brantôme
- Commune: Mareuil en Périgord
- Area^{1}: 4.13 km^{2} (1.59 sq mi)
- Elevation: 175 m (574 ft)
- Highest elevation: 185 m (607 ft)
- Lowest elevation: 98 m (322 ft)
- Population (2023): 78
  - Density: 19/km^{2} (49/sq mi)
- Time zone: UTC+01:00 (CET)
  - Summer (DST): UTC+02:00 (CEST)
- Postal code: 24340
- ^{1} French Land Register data, which excludes lakes, ponds, glaciers > 1 km^{2} (0.386 sq mi or 247 acres) and river estuaries.

Les Graulges (French pronunciation: [le ɡʁolʒ]; Limousin: Los Grauges) is a former commune in the Dordogne department in Nouvelle-Aquitaine in southwestern France. On 1 January 2017, it was merged into the new commune Mareuil en Périgord.

== Geography ==
The Lizonne forms the commune's southern border. The Bretanges, a tributary of the Lizonne, forms part of the commune's southeastern border. The village lies in the southern part of the commune, on a height above the Lizonne.

== See also ==
- Communes of the Dordogne department
