= Mareuil en Périgord =

- Commune
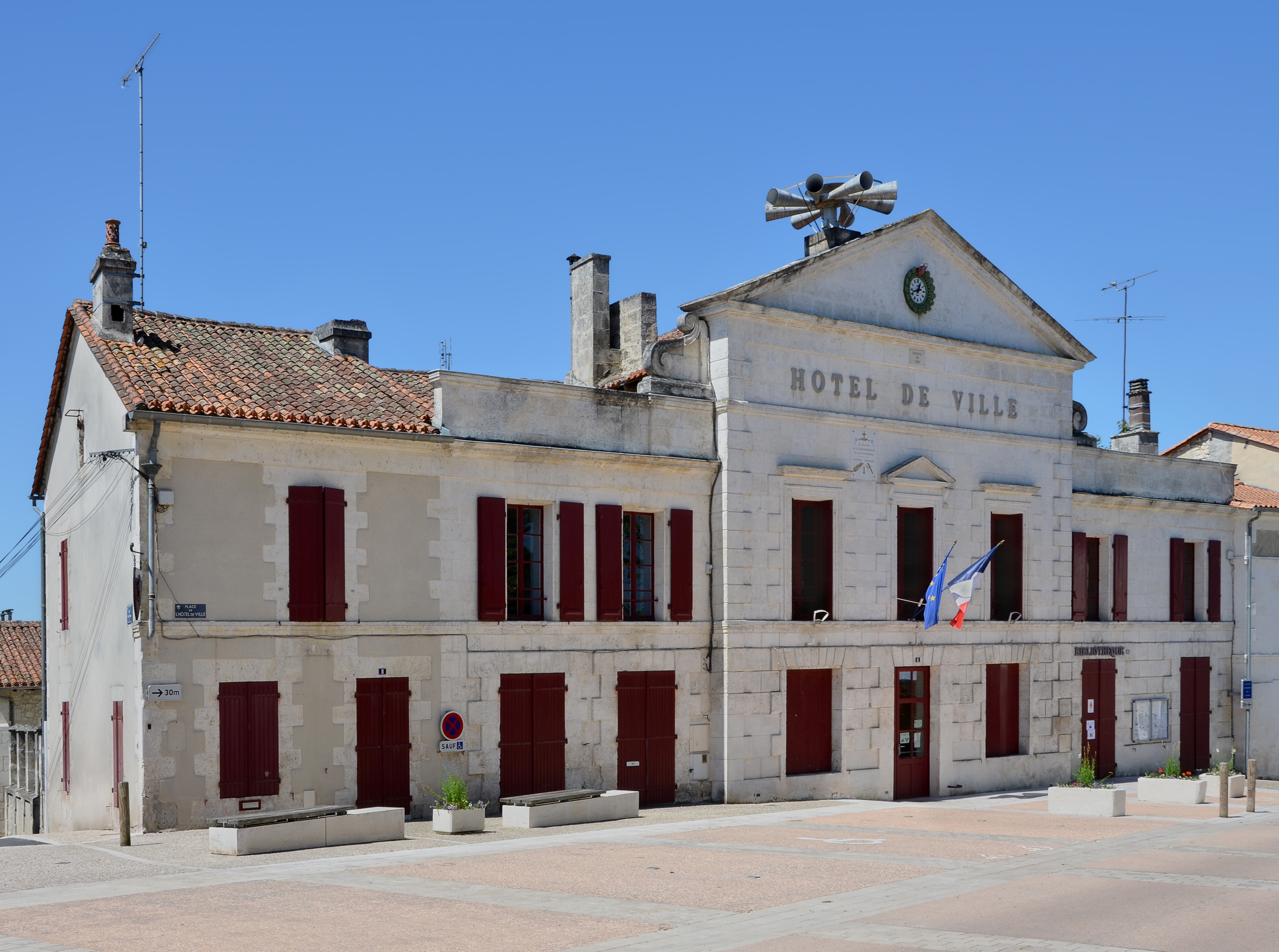
- The town hall in Mareuil
- Location of Mareuil en Périgord
- Location within France Location within Nouvelle-Aquitaine
- Coordinates: 45°27′07″N 0°27′11″E
- Country: France
- Region: Nouvelle-Aquitaine
- Department: Dordogne
- Arrondissement: Nontron
- Canton: Brantôme en Périgord
- Intercommunality: Dronne et Belle

Government
  - Mayor (2020–2026): Alain Ouiste
- Area^{1}: 150.48 km^{2} (58.10 sq mi)
- Population (2023): 2,326
  - Density: 15.46/km^{2} (40.03/sq mi)
- Time zone: UTC+01:00 (CET)
  - Summer (DST): UTC+02:00 (CEST)
- INSEE/Postal code: 24253 /24340
- ^{1} French Land Register data, which excludes lakes, ponds, glaciers > 1 km^{2} (0.386 sq mi or 247 acres) and river estuaries.

Mareuil en Périgord (French pronunciation: [maʁœj ɑ̃ peʁiɡɔʁ], literally Mareuil in Périgord; Occitan: Maruelh de Perigòrd) is a commune in the department of Dordogne, southwestern France. The municipality was established on 1 January 2017 by the merger of former communes Mareuil (the seat), Beaussac, Champeaux-et-la-Chapelle-Pommier, Les Graulges, Léguillac-de-Cercles, Monsec, Puyrenier, Saint-Sulpice-de-Mareuil and Vieux-Mareuil.

== Population ==
Population data refer to the commune in its geography as of January 2025.

Historical population
Year	Pop.	±% p.a.
1968	2,913	—
1975	2,885	−0.14%
1982	2,732	−0.78%
1990	2,668	−0.30%
1999	2,471	−0.85%
2007	2,538	+0.33%
2012	2,534	−0.03%
2017	2,342	−1.56%
2023	2,326	−0.11%
Source: INSEE

== See also ==
- Communes of the Dordogne department
