= Léguillac-de-Cercles =

- Part of Mareuil en Périgord
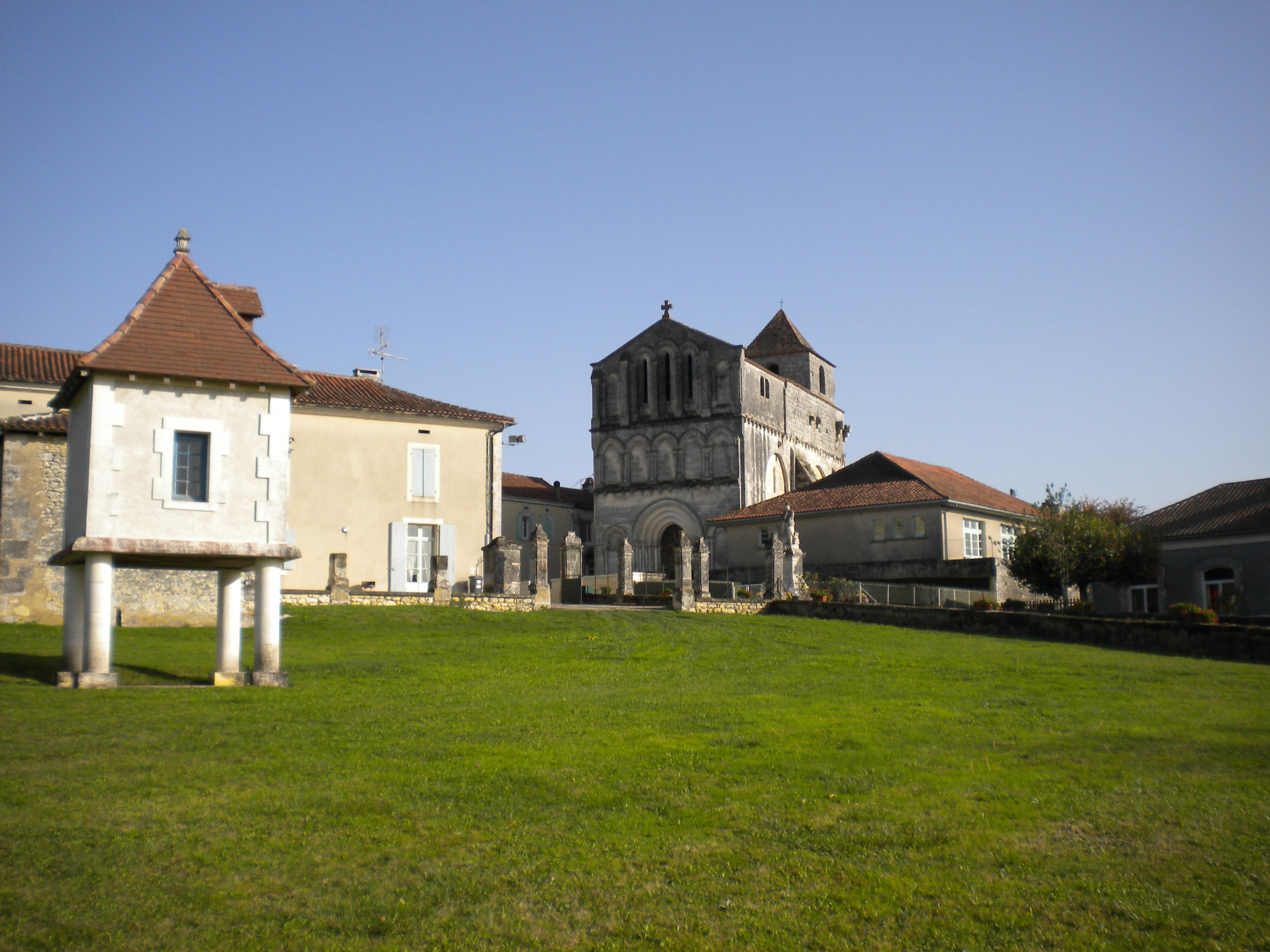
- Location of Léguillac-de-Cercles
- Location within France Location within Nouvelle-Aquitaine
- Coordinates: 45°23′34″N 0°30′55″E
- Country: France
- Region: Nouvelle-Aquitaine
- Department: Dordogne
- Arrondissement: Nontron
- Canton: Brantôme
- Commune: Mareuil en Périgord
- Area^{1}: 21.47 km^{2} (8.29 sq mi)
- Elevation: 210 m (690 ft)
- Highest elevation: 211 m (692 ft)
- Lowest elevation: 115 m (377 ft)
- Population (2023): 262
  - Density: 12.2/km^{2} (31.6/sq mi)
- Time zone: UTC+01:00 (CET)
  - Summer (DST): UTC+02:00 (CEST)
- Postal code: 24340
- ^{1} French Land Register data, which excludes lakes, ponds, glaciers > 1 km^{2} (0.386 sq mi or 247 acres) and river estuaries.

Léguillac-de-Cercles (French pronunciation: [leɡɥijak də sɛʁkl], literally Léguillac of Cercles; Limousin: Lagulhac de Cercle) is a former commune in the Dordogne department in Nouvelle-Aquitaine in southwestern France. On 1 January 2017, it was merged into the new commune Mareuil en Périgord.

== See also ==
- Communes of the Dordogne department
