= Champeaux-et-la-Chapelle-Pommier =

- Part of Mareuil en Périgord
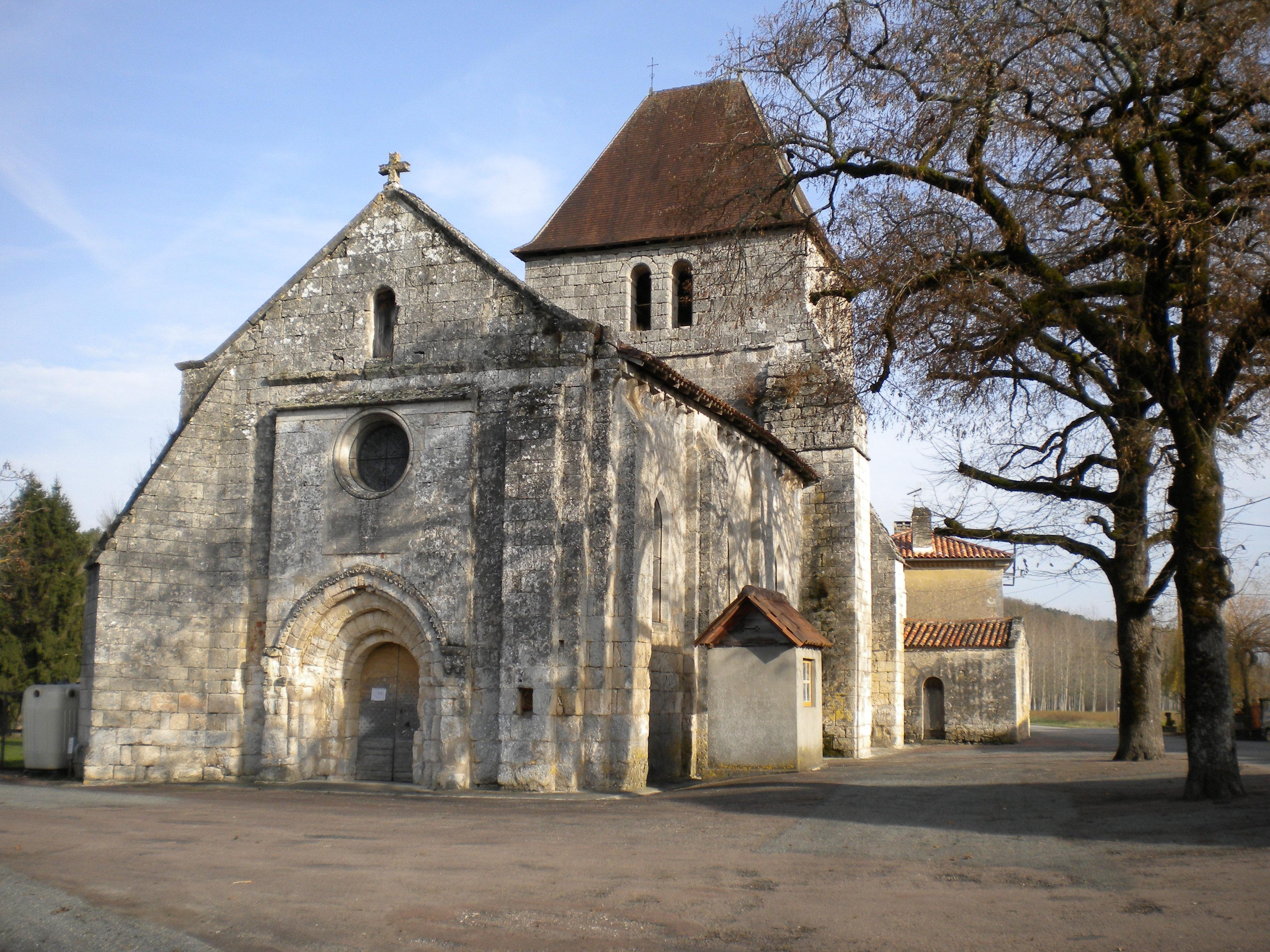
- Location of Champeaux-et-la-Chapelle-Pommier
- Location within France Location within Nouvelle-Aquitaine
- Coordinates: 45°28′27″N 0°34′46″E
- Country: France
- Region: Nouvelle-Aquitaine
- Department: Dordogne
- Arrondissement: Nontron
- Canton: Brantôme
- Commune: Mareuil en Périgord
- Area^{1}: 23.48 km^{2} (9.07 sq mi)
- Elevation: 120 m (390 ft)
- Highest elevation: 251 m (823 ft)
- Lowest elevation: 135 m (443 ft)
- Population (2023): 155
  - Density: 6.60/km^{2} (17.1/sq mi)
- Time zone: UTC+01:00 (CET)
  - Summer (DST): UTC+02:00 (CEST)
- Postal code: 24340
- ^{1} French Land Register data, which excludes lakes, ponds, glaciers > 1 km^{2} (0.386 sq mi or 247 acres) and river estuaries.

Champeaux-et-la-Chapelle-Pommier (French pronunciation: [ʃɑ̃po e la ʃapɛl pɔmje]; Limousin: Champeus e La Chapela de Pomiers) is a former commune in the Dordogne department in Nouvelle-Aquitaine in southwestern France. On 1 January 2017, it was merged into the new commune Mareuil en Périgord.

== Geography ==
The Lizonne flows west through the middle of the commune.

== See also ==
- Communes of the Dordogne department
