= Puyrenier =

- Part of Mareuil en Périgord
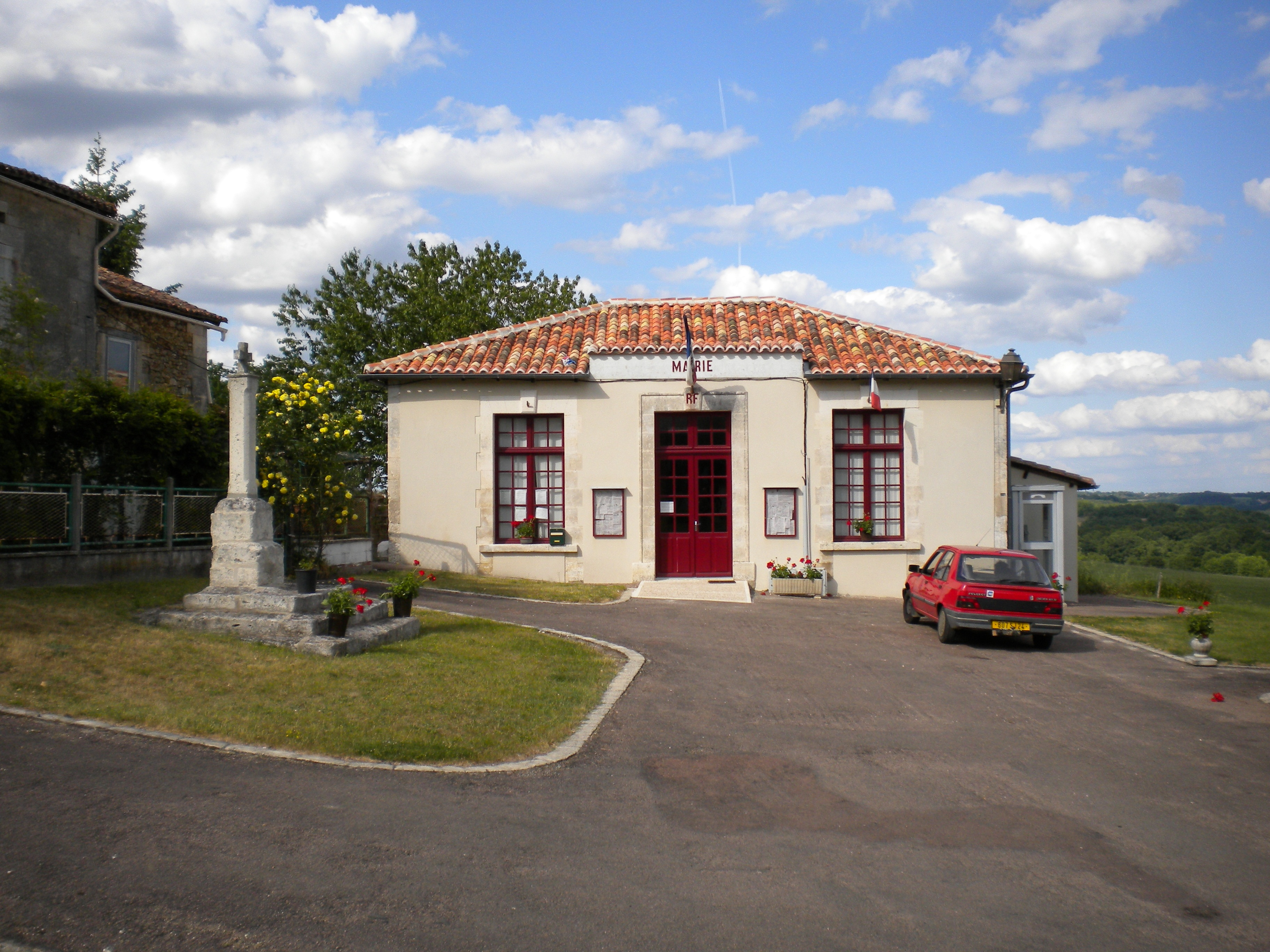
- Town hall

- Coat of arms
- Location of Puyrenier
- Location within France Location within Nouvelle-Aquitaine
- Coordinates: 45°28′47″N 0°28′29″E
- Country: France
- Region: Nouvelle-Aquitaine
- Department: Dordogne
- Arrondissement: Nontron
- Canton: Brantôme
- Commune: Mareuil en Périgord
- Area^{1}: 7.42 km^{2} (2.86 sq mi)
- Elevation: 150 m (490 ft)
- Highest elevation: 203 m (666 ft)
- Lowest elevation: 105 m (344 ft)
- Population (2023): 55
  - Density: 7.4/km^{2} (19/sq mi)
- Time zone: UTC+01:00 (CET)
  - Summer (DST): UTC+02:00 (CEST)
- Postal code: 24340
- ^{1} French Land Register data, which excludes lakes, ponds, glaciers > 1 km^{2} (0.386 sq mi or 247 acres) and river estuaries.

Puyrenier (French pronunciation: [pɥiʁenje]; also Puyrénier; Limousin: Puei Rainier) is a former commune in the Dordogne department in Nouvelle-Aquitaine in southwestern France. On 1 January 2017, it was merged into the new commune Mareuil en Périgord.

== Geography ==
The Lizonne forms the commune's northern border.

== See also ==
- Communes of the Dordogne department
