= Lizonne =

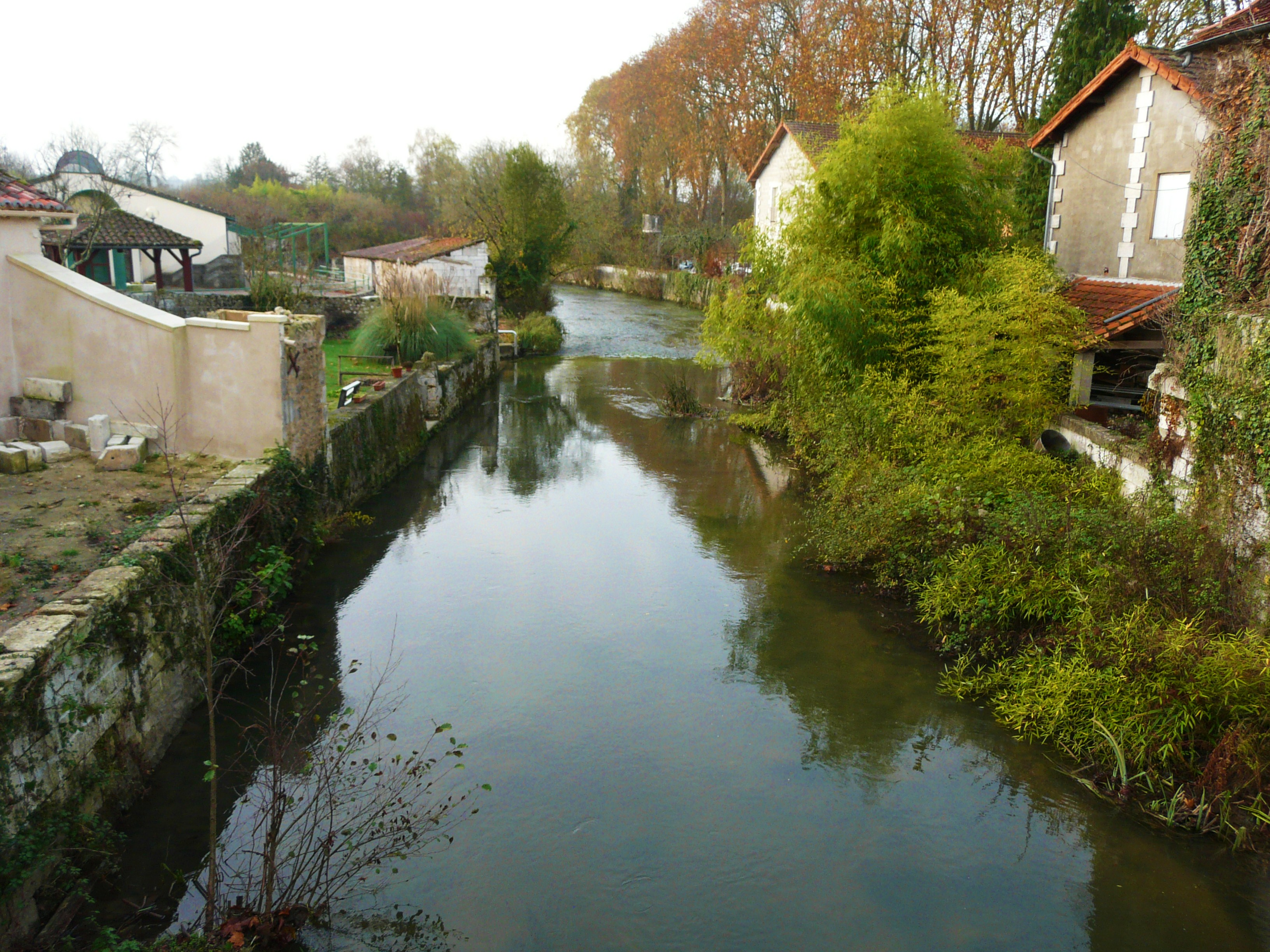
- The Lizonne between Combiers (left) and La Rochebeaucourt-et-Argentine (right)

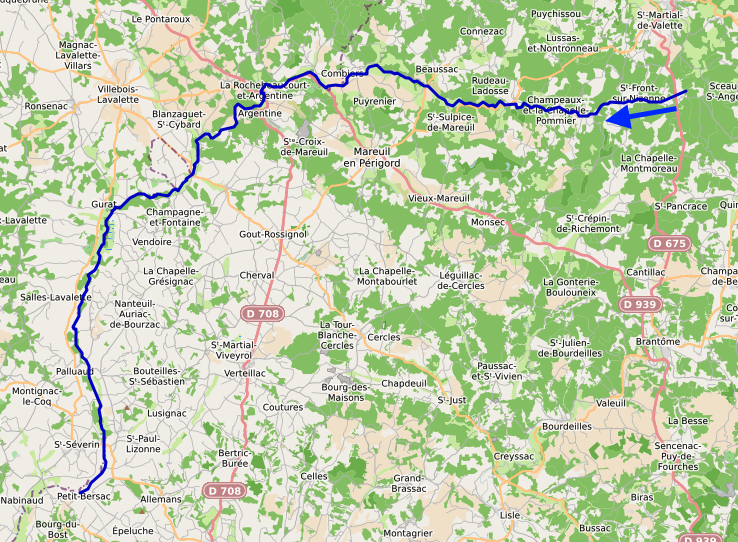

Location
- Country: France

Physical characteristics
- Source
  - location: Sceau-Saint-Angel
  - coordinates: 45°29′00″N 00°40′07″E
  - elevation: 200 m (660 ft)
- Mouth
  - location: Dronne
  - coordinates: 45°17′22″N 00°15′09″E
  - elevation: 48 m (157 ft)
- Length: 60.5 km (37.6 mi)
- Basin size: 640 km^{2} (250 sq mi)
- Discharge
  - average: 5.28 m^{3}/s (186 cu ft/s)

Basin features
- Progression: Dronne→ Isle→ Dordogne→ Gironde estuary→ Atlantic Ocean

The Lizonne (French pronunciation: [lizɔn]), also called the Nizonne, is a 60.5 km (37.6 mi) long river in the Dordogne and Charente departments in southwestern France. Its source is near Morelière, a hamlet in Sceau-Saint-Angel. It flows generally southwest. It is a right tributary of the Dronne, into which it flows between Saint-Séverin and Allemans.

Part of its course forms part of the border between the Dordogne and Charente departments.

== Departments and communes along its course ==
This list is ordered from source to mouth:

- Dordogne: Sceau-Saint-Angel, Saint-Front-sur-Nizonne, Champeaux-et-la-Chapelle-Pommier, Rudeau-Ladosse, Saint-Sulpice-de-Mareuil, Puyrenier, Beaussac, Les Graulges, Sainte-Croix-de-Mareuil, Combiers, La Rochebeaucourt-et-Argentine,
- Charente: Édon,
- Dordogne: Champagne-et-Fontaine,
- Charente: Blanzaguet-Saint-Cybard, Gurat,
- Dordogne: Vendoire,
- Charente: Vaux-Lavalette, Salles-Lavalette,
- Dordogne: Nanteuil-Auriac-de-Bourzac,
- Charente: Palluaud,
- Dordogne: Bouteilles-Saint-Sébastien, Saint-Paul-Lizonne,
- Charente: Saint-Séverin,
- Dordogne: Allemans,
