= Vieux-Mareuil =

- Part of Mareuil en Périgord
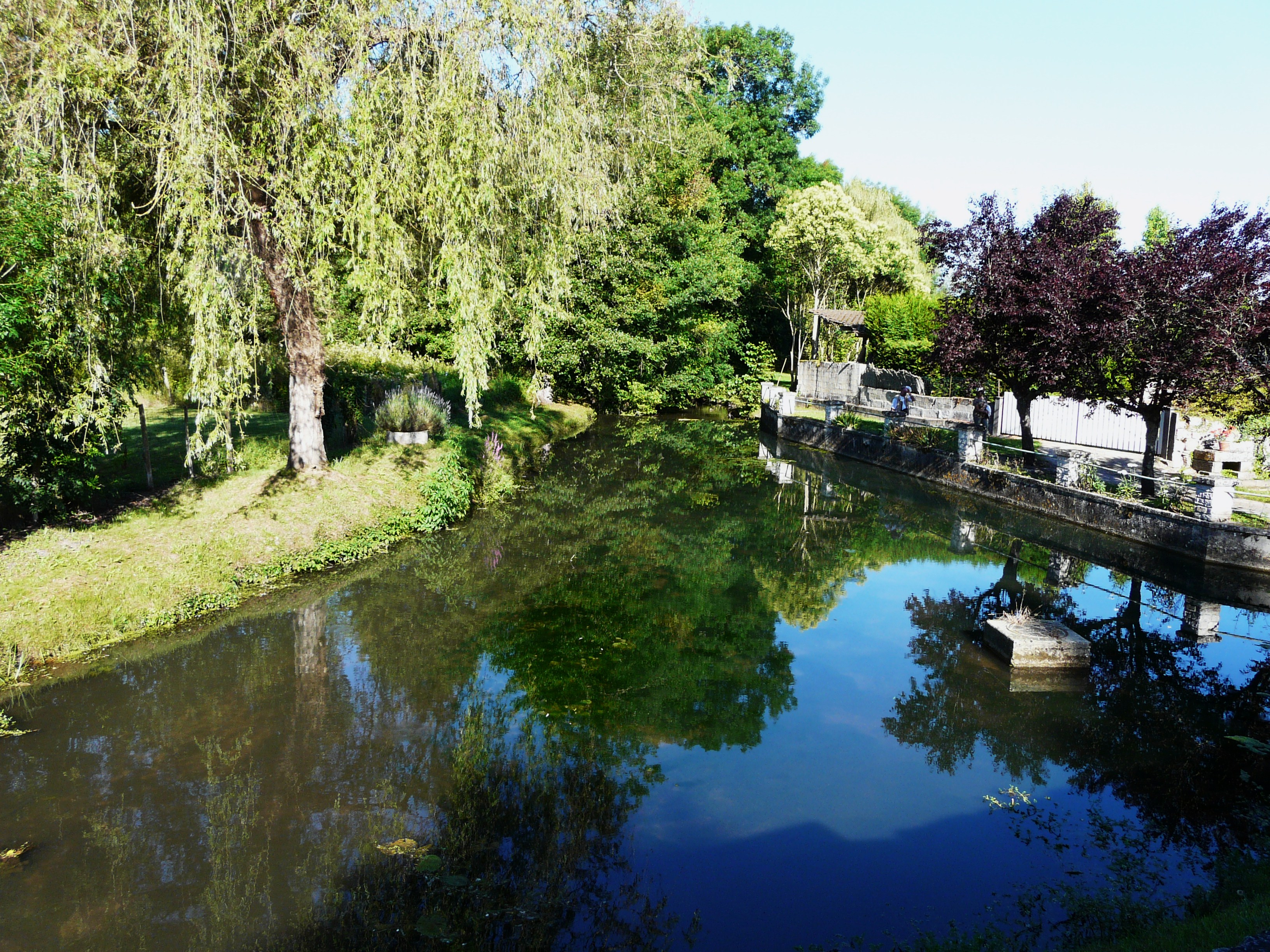

- Coat of arms
- Location of Vieux-Mareuil
- Location within France Location within Nouvelle-Aquitaine
- Coordinates: 45°25′56″N 0°30′01″E
- Country: France
- Region: Nouvelle-Aquitaine
- Department: Dordogne
- Arrondissement: Nontron
- Canton: Brantôme
- Commune: Mareuil en Périgord
- Area^{1}: 27.00 km^{2} (10.42 sq mi)
- Elevation: 129 m (423 ft)
- Highest elevation: 226 m (741 ft)
- Lowest elevation: 109 m (358 ft)
- Population (2023): 314
  - Density: 11.6/km^{2} (30.1/sq mi)
- Time zone: UTC+01:00 (CET)
  - Summer (DST): UTC+02:00 (CEST)
- Postal code: 24340
- ^{1} French Land Register data, which excludes lakes, ponds, glaciers > 1 km^{2} (0.386 sq mi or 247 acres) and river estuaries.

Vieux-Mareuil (French pronunciation: [vjø maʁœj]; Limousin: Vielh Maruelh) is a former commune in the Dordogne department in Nouvelle-Aquitaine in southwestern France. On 1 January 2017, it was merged into the new commune Mareuil en Périgord.

== See also ==
- Communes of the Dordogne department
