= Rudeau-Ladosse =

- Commune
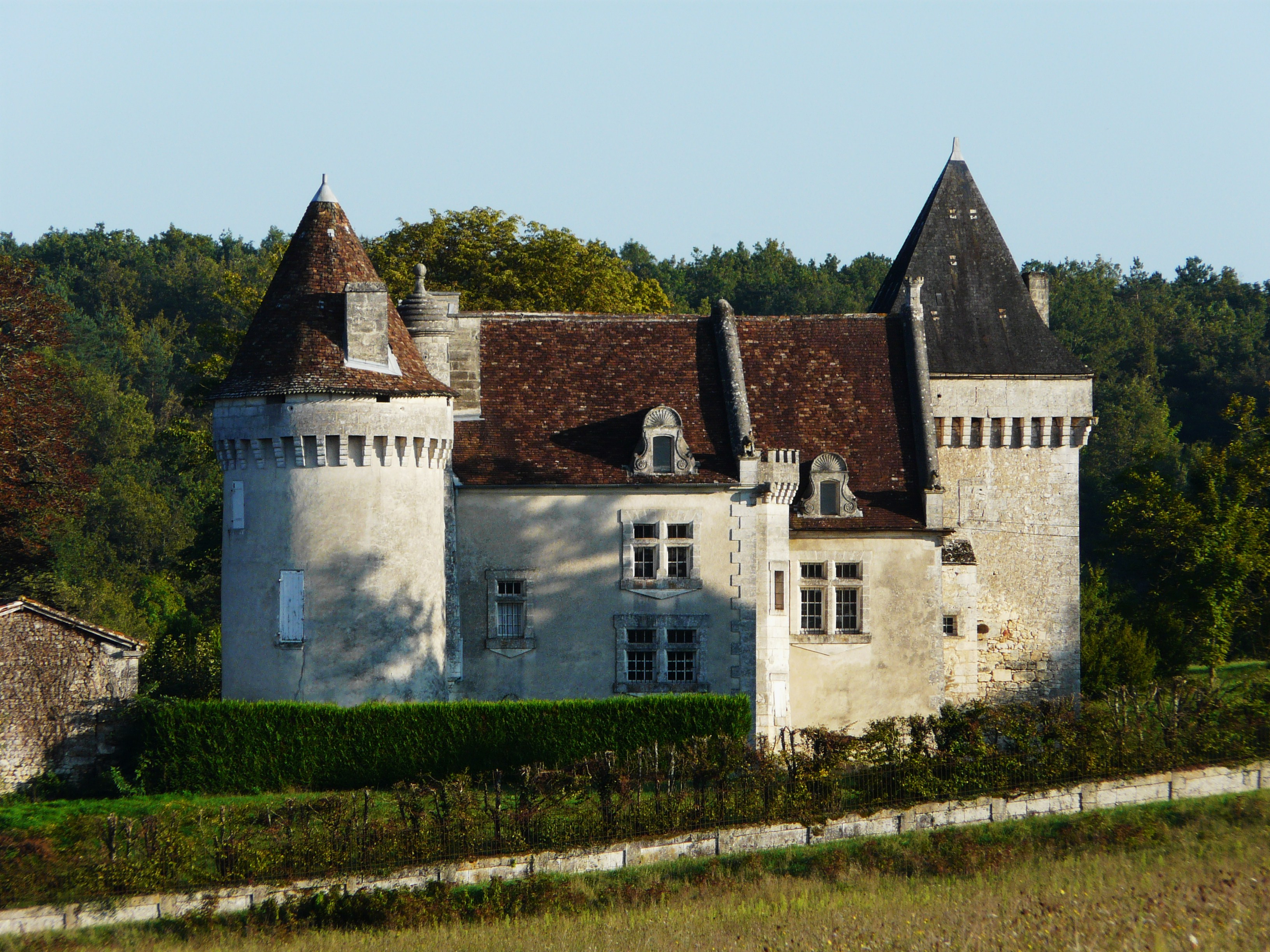
- Chateau of Bellussière
- Location of Rudeau-Ladosse
- Location within France Location within Nouvelle-Aquitaine
- Coordinates: 45°28′52″N 0°33′03″E
- Country: France
- Region: Nouvelle-Aquitaine
- Department: Dordogne
- Arrondissement: Nontron
- Canton: Brantôme en Périgord

Government
  - Mayor (2020–2026): Martine Desjardins
- Area^{1}: 13.74 km^{2} (5.31 sq mi)
- Elevation: 193 m (633 ft)
- Highest elevation: 203 m (666 ft)
- Lowest elevation: 115 m (377 ft)
- Population (2023): 154
  - Density: 11.2/km^{2} (29.0/sq mi)
- Time zone: UTC+01:00 (CET)
  - Summer (DST): UTC+02:00 (CEST)
- INSEE/Postal code: 24221 /24340
- ^{1} French Land Register data, which excludes lakes, ponds, glaciers > 1 km^{2} (0.386 sq mi or 247 acres) and river estuaries.

Rudeau-Ladosse (French pronunciation: [ʁydo ladɔs]; Occitan: Rudeu e Ladaussa) is a commune in the Dordogne department in Nouvelle-Aquitaine in southwestern France.

== Geography ==
The Lizonne river forms the commune's southern border. The ruisseau de Beaussac, a tributary of the Lizonne, forms the commune's southwestern border.

== Population ==
Historical population
Year	Pop.	±% p.a.
1968	268	—
1975	262	−0.32%
1982	245	−0.95%
1990	216	−1.56%
1999	157	−3.48%
2007	167	+0.77%
2012	184	+1.96%
2017	160	−2.76%
2023	154	−0.63%
Source: INSEE

== See also ==
- Communes of the Dordogne department
