= Mareuil, Dordogne =

Mareuil
- Part of Mareuil en Périgord
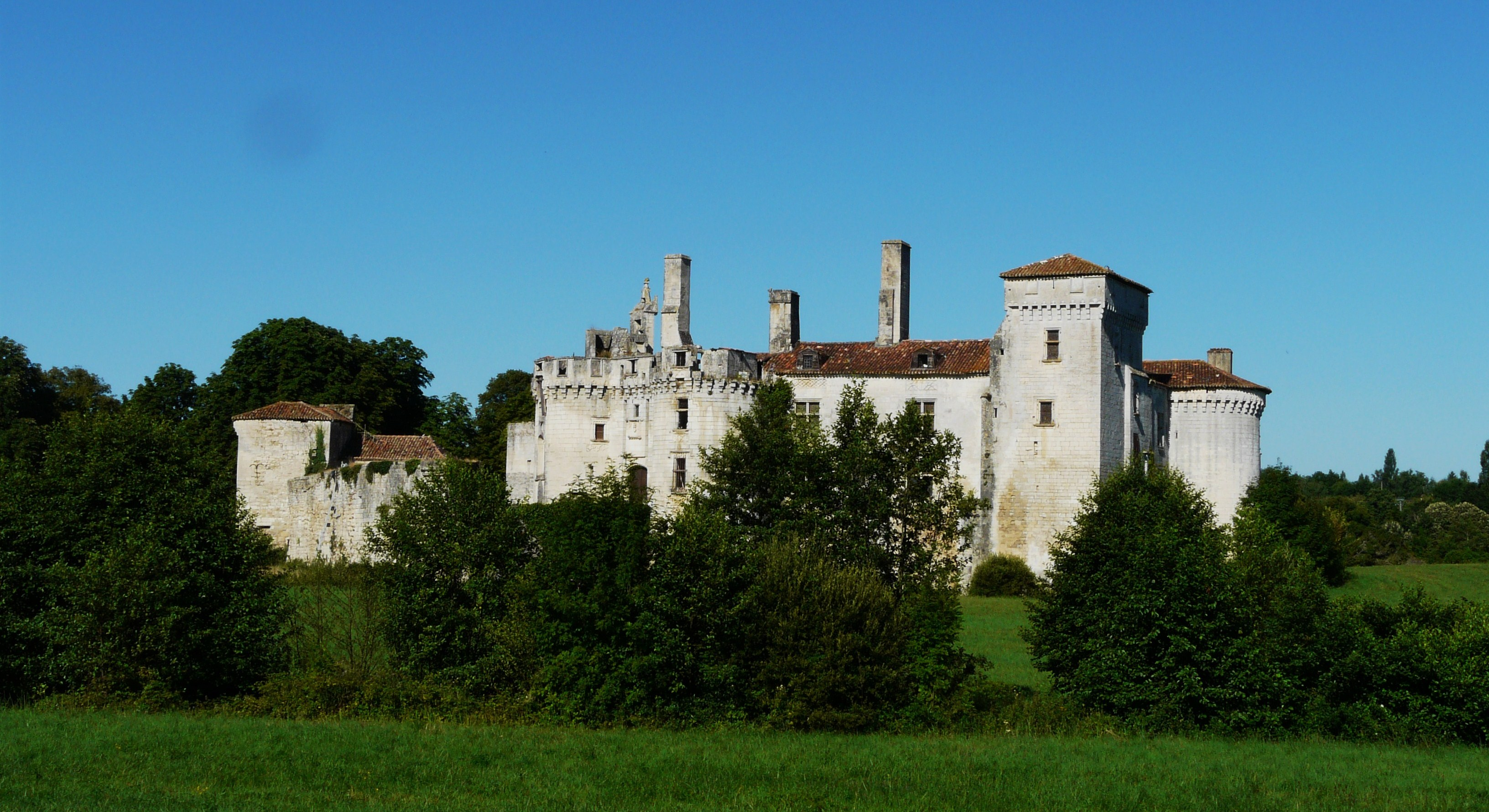
- Chateau

- Coat of arms
- Location of Mareuil
- Location within France Location within Nouvelle-Aquitaine
- Coordinates: 45°27′05″N 0°27′11″E
- Country: France
- Region: Nouvelle-Aquitaine
- Department: Dordogne
- Arrondissement: Nontron
- Canton: Brantôme
- Commune: Mareuil en Périgord
- Area^{1}: 25.13 km^{2} (9.70 sq mi)
- Elevation: 124 m (407 ft)
- Highest elevation: 207 m (679 ft)
- Lowest elevation: 105 m (344 ft)
- Population (2022): 1,054
  - Density: 41.94/km^{2} (108.6/sq mi)
- Time zone: UTC+01:00 (CET)
  - Summer (DST): UTC+02:00 (CEST)
- Postal code: 24340
- ^{1} French Land Register data, which excludes lakes, ponds, glaciers > 1 km^{2} (0.386 sq mi or 247 acres) and river estuaries.

Mareuil (French pronunciation: [maʁœj]; Limousin: Maruelh), known locally as Mareuil-sur-Belle, is a former commune in the Dordogne department in Nouvelle-Aquitaine in southwestern France. On 1 January 2017, it was merged into the new commune Mareuil en Périgord. It was the birthplace of the troubadour Arnaut de Mareuil and of historian Michel Tardieu (born 1938).

== Population ==
Historical population

Year	Pop.	±% p.a.
1793	696	—
1800	755	+1.17%
1806	784	+0.63%
1821	841	+0.47%
1831	1,624	+6.80%
1836	1,661	+0.45%
1841	1,765	+1.22%
1846	1,828	+0.70%
1851	1,837	+0.10%
1856	1,779	−0.64%
1861	1,676	−1.19%
1866	1,624	−0.63%
1872	1,565	−0.61%
1876	1,543	−0.35%
1881	1,603	+0.77%
1886	1,616	+0.16%
1891	1,604	−0.15%

Year	Pop.	±% p.a.
1896	1,483	−1.56%
1901	1,392	−1.26%
1906	1,404	+0.17%
1911	1,341	−0.91%
1921	1,302	−0.29%
1926	1,209	−1.47%
1931	1,195	−0.23%
1936	1,283	+1.43%
1946	1,228	−0.44%
1954	1,167	−0.63%
1962	1,137	−0.33%
1968	1,103	−0.50%
1975	1,209	+1.32%
1982	1,210	+0.01%
1990	1,194	−0.17%
1999	1,112	−0.79%
2022	1,054	−0.23%

Source: EHESS and INSEE

== See also ==
- Communes of the Dordogne department
