= Hautefaye case =

Criminal incident during a fair in Hautefaye, France

The Hautefaye case
- Location: France; Hautefaye, Dordogne
- Date: August 16, 1870
- Attack type: Homicide
- Deaths: A dead man, Alain de Monéys
- Charges: Murder, lynching
- Cassation appeal rejected on January 26, 1871

The Hautefaye Affair, also known as the Hautefaye Drama, was a criminal incident that took place on August 16, 1870, during a fair in the village of Hautefaye in the Dordogne region (France), when Alain de Monéys, a young local nobleman, was beaten, tortured and finally burned alive by the crowd.

The case was set against the backdrop of the 1870 war and the heightened passions it aroused in the population of this small village. Following a simple misunderstanding, Alain de Monéys was mistaken for a Prussian, leading to his lynching. The barbarity of the event was further amplified by rumors—attributed to the mayor—that the villagers had committed acts of cannibalism. Of the twenty-one people accused of the murder, the four most responsible were sentenced to death and one to penal labor for life.

Several books have been written on the case. For writer Georges Marbeck, it symbolizes the ritualized murder of the scapegoat, while for historian Alain Corbin, in Le Village des « cannibales », the reasons have more to do with the political representations current at the time among Perigordian peasants, representations marked by anguish and fear of a plot hatched by the Republicans, nobles and priests to overthrow the emperor.

== Context ==
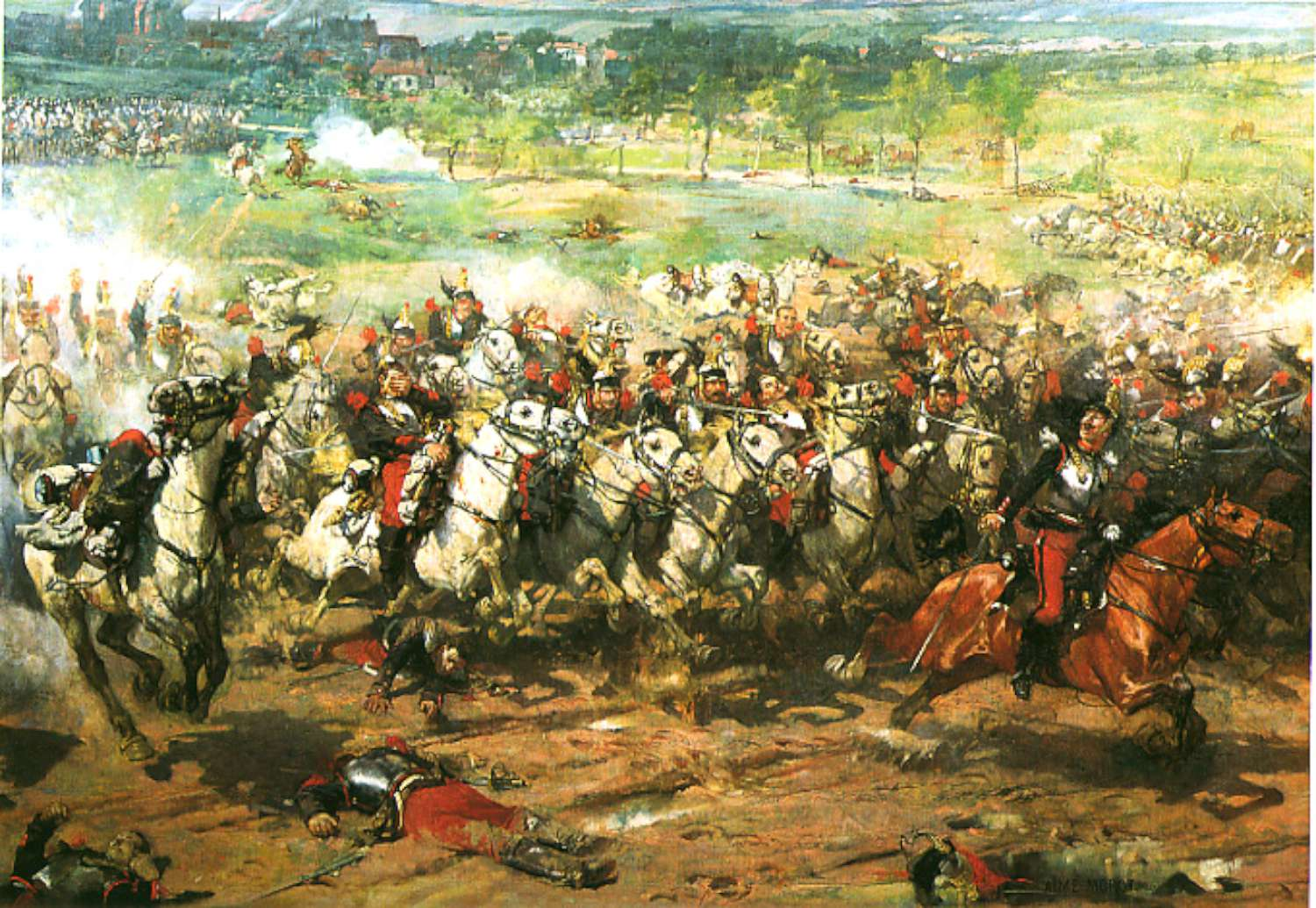
Illustration of the battle of Wörth, the source of the misunderstanding that led to the lynching of Alain de Monéys.

The story takes place in August 1870, one month after France declared war on Prussia on July 15, 1870. The first reports of defeats on the Lorraine front, at Wissembourg, Forbach and Wörth, were announced on August 5 and 6. For Alain Corbin, the government's decision to restrict information following these defeats resulted in the spread of rumors about the presence of Prussian spies in the vicinity, and about collusion between nobles and priests to conspire against the Empire, and re-establish the monarchy. This sparked public concern and even collective fear.

Several incidents took place. In Châtellerault, just a few days before, a railway employee was molested on suspicion of being a spy in the pay of the enemy. These worries and rumors were among the rumors that spread through the village and the fairground during Hautefaye's annual cattle fair. This event, a meeting and trading place for the inhabitants of the village and neighboring communes, was also affected by the consequences of the drought that hit the region in 1870.

The general political context in the Dordogne was compounded by a disastrous economic situation for farmers. In the summer of 1870, the region had been suffering for several months from a lack of rain, as well as high temperatures, which were damaging both livestock and crops. On August 16, the day of the Hautefaye fair when sales were generally good, business was very poor: combined with news of the war, this contributed to a climate of tension. The weather was particularly hot, and some of the farmers and craftsmen present at the fair drank alcohol (piquette with jenever, noah wine, pineau or absinthe) as the day wore on.

== The case ==
=== The protagonists ===
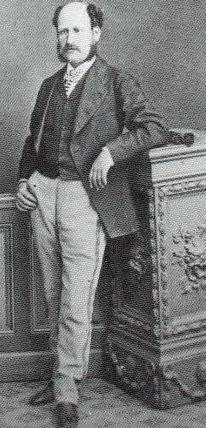
The victim, Alain de Monéys.

The victim, Alain Romuald de Monéys d'Ordières, was the son of Amédée de Monéys, former mayor of Beaussac. He managed the Château de Brétanges estate located between Hautefaye and Beaussac. An unmarried 32-year-old, he was exempt from military service due to his physical condition, and consequently from the conscription that followed the Prussian threat in 1870. However, having expressed a desire to enlist for his country, he had this immunity lifted and plans to leave soon for the Lorraine front. He had been a member of the Beaussac municipal council since 1865, and was the commune's first deputy. His family owned 80 hectares of land in Hautefaye. As manager of the estate, he attended the Hautefaye fair on August 16, 1870.

The main perpetrators of the tragedy, designated as such by the courts, were inhabitants of Hautefaye and neighboring villages who had come to the fair. They were: François Chambord, 33, a farrier from Pouvrière, in the commune of Souffrignac (Charente), 9 kilometers from Beaussac (considered the leader of the group, he did not personally know the victim, as did the other main assailants); Léonard, known as "Piarrouty", aged 53, ragpicker in Nontronneau; Pierre Buisson, known as "Arnaud" or "Lirou", aged 33, farmer; François Mazière, known as "Silloux", aged 29, sharecropper; brothers Étienne and Jean Campot, farmers in Mainzac.

Those who tried to protect and defend Alain de Monéys were the Abbé Victor Saint-Pasteur, parish priest of Hautefaye; Philippe Dubois, a pit sawyer from Hautefaye; Georges Mathieu, a craftsman from Beaussac and nephew of Bernard Mathieu, mayor of Hautefaye; and Pascal, the servant at Château de Bretanges.

=== First incident ===
The affair began with an incident involving Camille de Maillard de Lafaye, a 26-year-old cousin of Alain de Monéys, son of the mayor of Beaussac and known for his Legitimist views. He was the victim of an initial misunderstanding, of no personal consequence, but which was to affect Alain de Monéys.

After reading dispatches on the battle of Wörth, Maillard announced that the French army had been forced to retreat. He was then taken to task by local residents, accused of spreading fake news and of being in the pay of the Prussians. Attempting to explain and clarify his remarks, he was accused of shouting "Vive la République!" As tempers flared, hostilities against him became increasingly intense. However, he managed to escape thanks to the intervention of his tenant farmer.

During the trial, one of Alain de Monéys' murderers, François Mazière, explained that a few days earlier, on August 9, during a fair in Charras, he had heard Maillard declare: "The emperor is lost, he has no more cartridges", and regretted that on that day, outraged by these remarks, he had not been able to "do his business" with him. For historian Alain Corbin, this implies that the August 16 killing of Monéys was clearly premeditated. According to Corbin, Maillard's escape forced the suspicious and heated inhabitants to fall back on Monéys, making him a scapegoat.

=== Second incident ===
Alain de Monéys arrived at the Hautefaye fairgrounds at around two o'clock in the afternoon, after Camille de Maillard had fled. Shortly after arriving at the fair, Monéys saw peasants approaching, armed with sticks. Asking about the situation, he learned from a peddler named Brethenoux, nicknamed "le Mexicain" (because he took part in the Mexican campaign), that his cousin, Camille de Maillard, had shouted " Down with Napoleon! Long live the Republic!" Refusing to believe Brethenoux's words, Monéys accompanied the peasant to the scene of the incident to check whether other witnesses confirmed the facts. These included: Le Cussou, Pinard, Mazière, the Campot brothers and Buisson, all of whom confirmed Brethenoux's story. The group then rallied around Alain de Monéys, who continued to defend his cousin.

Still refusing to admit that Maillard could have uttered these words, Monéys was taken to task by the growing and increasingly hostile group. Confused by some with Maillard, he became the center of the incident, and was in turn accused of having shouted "Long live the Republic", of being a traitor and a Prussian. Despite his denials (he insisted that he was on the side of the peasants and that he was going to enlist to fight the Prussians), the group made the first death threats and struck the first blows.

=== The torture ===
==== Hanging attempt ====
Despite attempts to clear up the misunderstanding and demonstrate his good faith, Alain de Monéys found himself surrounded by increasingly angry peasants. One of them, Buisson, shouted, "He's a Prussian, we've got to hang him, we've got to burn him!" The Campot brothers threw the first blows, the act that precipitated the outbreak of collective aggression. Protecting himself from the blows, shouting "Long live the Emperor!" to calm the assembly, Alain de Monéys soon found himself outflanked and manhandled. Saint-Pasteur, parish priest of Hautefaye, intervened with a pistol in his hand to help him. But, faced with the aggressors' determination, and sensing that he himself was about to be exposed to the group's growing fury, he took refuge in the presbytery. He attempted a diversion by proposing that the peasants accompany him to drink to the emperor's health, which some of them agreed to do.

Philippe Dubois and Georges Mathieu, the nephew of the village mayor, then intervened, trying to pull Monéys away from the repeated onslaughts of the peasants; they too were overwhelmed by the multitude, and were unable to shelter the nobleman, who had already been hit by hooves, sticks and goads. They tried to get him into the house of the mayor, Bernard Mathieu, but the latter forbade entry for fear that the forcenés would burst in and smash his crockery. The protectors, in turn, were unable to stop the group any longer. Mazière and Buisson then seized the victim and delivered him once again to the fury of the peasants, satiated with the wine offered by the parish priest.

The group, led by Chambord, initially planned to take Monéys to the authorities, but faced with the passivity of the village mayor, the peasants decided to hang him from a cherry tree. Alain Corbin points out that the mayor's lack of authority at this point allowed Chambord to become the leader of the punitive enterprise: he went so far as to claim to be a member of the Hautefaye town council, which authorized him to take the initiative. The attempt to hang him failed, due to the fragility of the tree's branches; it was decided to beat him to death.

==== Tortures ====
From then on, the intention to prolong the torture before Alain de Monéys was put to death was in place. Chambord harangued the group: "Before killing the Prussian, we must make him suffer". The torturers gave the victim a few moments of respite before returning to the attack. He was dragged into a room used as a workshop by the mayor, who was also a farrier. The assailants tied him tightly with straps to the cattle crush, while Bouillet alias "Déjeunat" violently beat him on the face and legs with hooves and sticks. Corbin points out that little about this episode emerged from interrogations and witness testimony. On his way to the fair to join his master, Pascal, the Monéys' servant, alerted by the screams and warned by Georges Mathieu and Dubois, ran to rescue Alain de Monéys from the workshop, taking advantage of the assailants' temporary absence. The group's return, however, thwarted the new rescue attempt. Once again beaten, Monéys was hit on the head by a severe blow from Piarrouty with his hook scale, which some witnesses believed to be fatal.

At the insistence of the victim's protectors, the mayor offered to let him into his sheep barn. Alain de Monéys was sheltered and cared for by Dubois. The indictment mentions that, at that moment, "he believed himself saved. He wanted us to buy a barrel of wine to give to those who were chasing him". But external pressure from the group led by Chambord finally got the better of the door, which gave way just as Monéys, on Dubois' advice, tried to exchange his clothes for a smock in an attempt to escape unnoticed.

The Campot brothers seized the victim and handed him over to the peasants, whose violence reached a climax. According to witnesses, Alain de Monéys' head was "like a globe of blood". He was carried to the foirail, but Dubois tried to get him into the inn. The innkeeper closed the door on the ankle of the victim, who began to enter and collapsed from the pain. He was thought to be dead, but in an unexpected jolt, witnesses saw him get to his feet, walk to a barn, pick up a stake and point it at the forcenary group. Jean Campot had no difficulty in disarming Monéys and turning the stake on his victim, who was dragged under a cart. As soon as Monéys was extricated, Pierre Buisson used the stake to strike him in the back of the neck, which, according to witnesses, was the fatal blow. In all likelihood, from that moment on, it was a dying man, or even a corpse, who was the target of the crowd's wrath, everyone wanting to take part in the slaughter, which lasted around ten minutes. Corbin points out that, apart from Piarrouty's hook and a pitchfork, no sharp weapons - neither knives nor axes - were used. After the beating of the body, Mazière and Jean Campot each took one of the victim's legs with the intention of dismembering him, but only succeeded in removing his shoes.

=== The cremation ===
Having each grabbed one of Alain de Monéys' legs, Mazière and Campot dragged him in the direction of an old pond, known to the locals as "le lac desséché" (the dried lake), where it was customary to celebrate Saint John's Eve. They were followed by a procession of peasants and the mayor, wearing his sash. Alcide Dusolier, a childhood friend of Alain de Monéys who visited the scene the following day, recalled the moment in an 1874 text: "He was dragged by the legs through the narrow streets of the village, his bloody head ringing on the stones, his torn body jumping up and down: "Long live the emperor, long live the emperor!"

Once on the scene, the executioners threw Monéys' body into the dried-up pond. Under Chambord's direction, they gathered bundles, branches and other debris. Chambord took a bale of straw from a farmer, promising reimbursement from the emperor. Thrown on top of the body - which, according to some witnesses, was still moving - the bundles and hay were tamped down by Chambord and Campot. In a last-ditch attempt, Dubois tried to prevent the irreparable from happening, but was chased by a dozen peasants and forced to move away.

With no matches to hand, Chambord fetched, or had young Thibassou fetch, a pack of matches, and asked three children to set fire to the pile of sticks and hay. The pyre caught fire, to the cheers of the audience shouting "Long live the Emperor!" A man named Duroulet commented on the immolation: "See how well it grills!" Seeing the fat dripping from the burning body, a man named Besse added: "It's a pity all this fat is wasted", while another lit his cigarette on the embers of the pyre.

Corbin notes that exactly two hours elapsed between the beginning of the torture and its tragic denouement, and explains this "implicitly calculated" time management by a desire to dilute collective responsibility, so that everyone could participate in the lynching.

== After the lynching ==
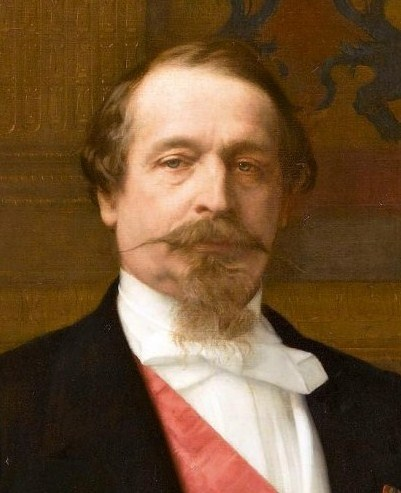
Emperor Napoleon III.

=== Reactions and consequences ===
On the evening of the tragedy, local residents were already aware of the events at Hautefaye. Some of the protagonists boasted of their actions: Piarrouty spoke of the three blows he had given the victim with the scales, while Madame Antony recounted how her tenant farmer, Mazière, had returned from Hautefaye elated, telling her: "Yes, we killed and burned the Prussian, I hit him and I'm not sorry. He didn't want to shout "Long live the Emperor!" Others hoped for a reward: Pierre Sarlat and stonemason François Cholet believed they would be paid by the emperor for burning Monéys.

The neighboring châtelains, frightened by the affair, feared the return of the jacqueries, and some, including the Monéys, formed defense groups to deal with a possible peasant attack. This fear even affected the town of Nontron, which feared an episode similar to the croquant rebellions that had affected Périgord in the 17th century. Marbeck noted that the psychosis of "Prussian gentlemen", which was at the root of the Hautefaye lynching, was matched by the psychosis of "raised pitchforks".

Two days after the event, the regional press reported on the tragedy. Le Charentais on August 18, then Le Nontronnais on August 20, spoke of acts of savagery and barbarism, with Le Nontronnais using the term "cannibals" to describe the peasants. The national press, with Le Moniteur universel of August 23, also reported the tragedy.

The story reached the government. On August 20, the minister of the interior, Henri Chevreau, responding to a deputy's question about the peasant uprisings taking place in the country, condemned Hautefaye's ordeal: "An act of savagery was recently committed in Nontron, and will be the object of general reprobation. A citizen was burned in the midst of a population that did not have the energy to oppose such an odious crime".

On August 27, by virtue of a decree dated the 24th, Bernard Mathieu was publicly removed from his position as mayor of Hautefaye by the Prefect of the Dordogne; he was replaced on a provisional basis by Élie Mondout, town councillor.

A new level of opprobrium was reached when, with the fall of the Empire, Alcide Dusolier, who had become the Dordogne's Republican sub-prefect, saw the village as a hotbed of Bonapartist rebellion, and advised the prefect to wipe Hautefaye off the map by erasing its name and annexing it to Nontron as an arrondissement. The proposal was forwarded to the minister of the interior. However, in the face of opposition from the acting mayor and then from Martial Villard, the new mayor - who objected that, since the law only recognized individual criminal responsibility, it could not incriminate an entire village for acts committed by individuals who were not all originally from Hautefaye - the project to rename the village was abandoned.

=== Rumors of cannibalism ===
The torture took place in the middle of a livestock fair, and many of the participants used metaphors relating to the slaughter of animals and the killing of pigs; one of them recounted: "We grilled a famous pig at Hautefaye". The notion of cannibal peasants took shape in the press, in particular in Le Nontronnais of August 20, which referred to the rioters at the foirail as "cannibals", a term relayed by local villagers and nobles, including Alain de Monéys' uncle, who mentioned the threat of "cannibals" in a letter dated August 22.

The rumor of cannibalism took precise form during the trial, based on phrases attributed to two of the protagonists at the time of the events. One of the witnesses, 78-year-old roofer Jean Maurel, claimed to have heard mayor Bernard Mathieu reply to the crowd who were intent on burning and eating the victim: "Do what you like, eat him if you want!" During the confrontation with the witness, the mayor fiercely denied having made such remarks, and the witness retracted his accusations. Besse also testified that he regretted seeing the fat drain from the victim's body without being able to collect it. During the hearing, two flat stones with traces of grease were presented as evidence.

=== Investigation and arrests ===
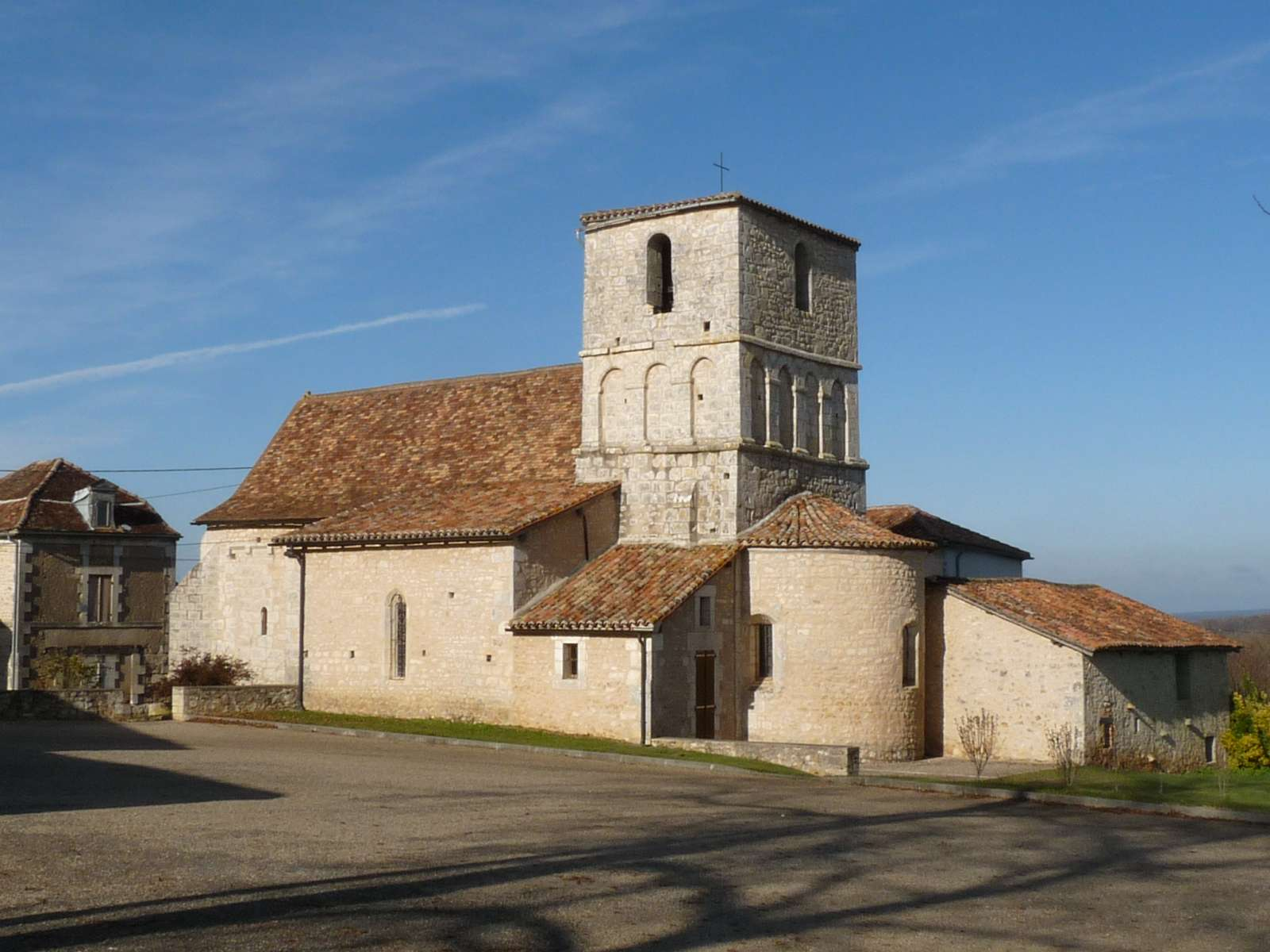
Hautefaye church.

The calcinated body of Alain de Monéys was laid between two sheets in the Hautefaye church. On the evening of August 16, Dr. Roby-Pavillon, who had performed the autopsy, wrote a report describing the body's condition: "Corpse almost entirely carbonized and lying on its back, face slightly turned towards the sky on the left, lower limbs spread, right hand stiffened above the head, as if to implore, left hand brought towards the corresponding shoulder and spread out, as if to ask for mercy; facial features expressing pain, trunk twisted and brought backwards". From the examination of the body, the doctor established that he had been burned while alive and had died as a result of asphyxia and burns, and that he had previously been injured by blunt, sharp and pungent objects. The skull wound was inflicted by an individual posted behind Monéys, while the latter was standing, and he was dragged while still alive. Roby-Pavillon concluded that "the combination of these injuries would inevitably have led to death".

The Nontron gendarmes, dispatched to the scene and the surrounding area, made the first arrests. Around fifty people were arrested and questioned by Judge Marchenaud. On August 19, Charles Boreau-Lajanadie, Attorney General of the Bordeaux Imperial Court, visited the murder scene and took charge of the investigation.

On September 18, the defendants left Nontron prison for Périgueux to be informed of the charges against them at the extraordinary session of the assizes scheduled for September 26, but this was adjourned to October 18. A proclamation was drafted by Alcide Dusolier to dispel rumors that the defendants had benefited from an amnesty following the proclamation of the Republic. It was posted in the streets of Nontron and listed the names of the accused:

The twenty-one defendants were transferred this morning from our prison to the departmental capital, under gendarmerie escort.

Here are the names in alphabetical order:

1. Beauvais, alias Roumaillac, pit sawyer in Vieux-Mareuil;
2. Besse, alias Duroulet, digger in Javerlhac;
3. Brouillet, alias Déjeunat, owner of Les Grézilles, commune of Feuillade (Charente);
4. Brut, mason at Fayemarteau, commune of Hautefaye;
5. Buisson, alias Lirou, in Feuillade (Charente);
6. Campot (Etienne), farmer at La Chabrie, commune of Mainzac (Charente);
7. Campot (Jean), farmer at La Chabrie, commune of Mainzac (Charente);
8. Chambord, farrier in Pouvrière, commune of Souffrignac (Charente);
9. Delage, alias Lajou, farmer in Doumeyrat, commune of Grassac (Charente);
10. Feytou (Girard), miner in Fontroubade, commune of Lussas-et-Nontronneau;
11. Frédéric (Jean), mason in Beaussac;
12. Lamongie (Léonard), farmer at Grand-Gilou, commune of Hautefaye;
13. Léchelle, alias Pinart, farmer at Fontroubade, commune of Lussas;
14. Léonard (François), alias Piarrouty, ragpicker at Nontronneau, commune of Lussas;
15. Licoine (Roland), farmer in Feuillade (Charente);
16. Limay (André), alias Thibassou, commune of Mainzac (Charente);
17. Mazière, farmer in Plambeau, commune of Hautefaye;
18. Murguet, at La Forêt, commune of Souffrignac;
19. Sallat père, cultivateur au Grand-Gilou, commune d'Hautefaye;
20. Sallat fils, farmer at Grand-Gilou, commune of Hautefaye;
21. Sarlat, alias Lamy, tailor in Nontronneau, commune of Lussas.

The twenty-one defendants appeared before the Périgueux court on December 13, 1870.

=== Trials and convictions ===
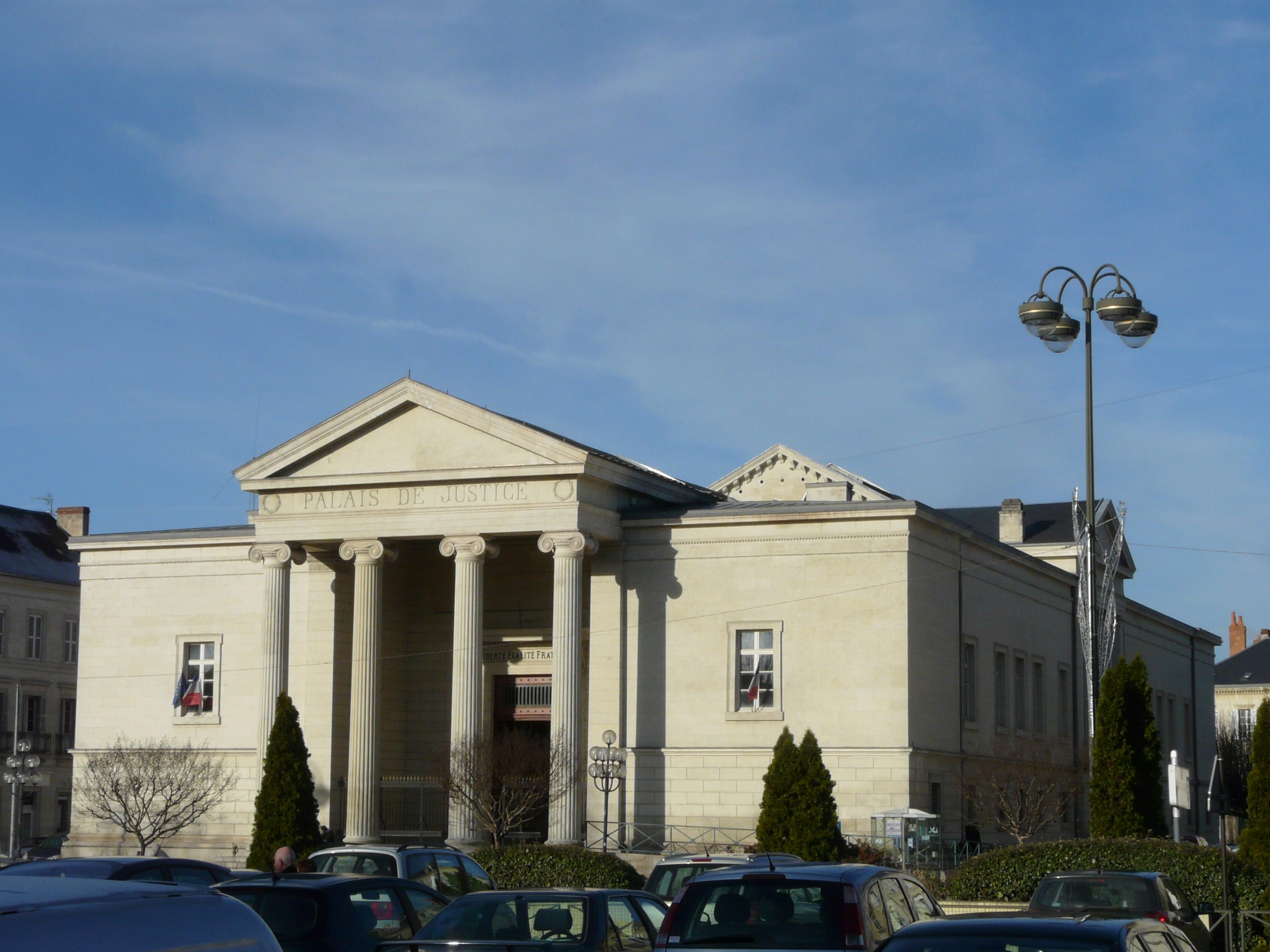
The Périgueux courthouse, where the trial was held.

The trial took place from December 13 to 21, 1870 at the Périgueux courthouse, presided over by Judge Brochon, and was very well attended. On the first day of the trial, the indictment found Chambord, Buisson, Jean Campot, Léonard dit Piarrouty and Mazière directly responsible for the premeditated homicide. The other defendants, including Jean Campot's brother Étienne, were judged to have aided and abetted the murderers.

The following days, until December 17, were devoted to the hearing of witnesses, one of the most important being that of former mayor Bernard Mathieu. Both the prosecution and the defense insisted on his lack of courage and his failure to assist the victim, as testified by Madame Antony and the roofer Jean Maurel, who recalled the words he had spoken to the peasants.

During the trial, the evidence was presented: two stones taken from the pyre showing grease stains, and Piarrouty's hook scale, one of the murder weapons, as well as the riding crop in Alain de Monéys' possession.

On December 21, after deliberation by the jury, the court sentenced Chambord, Buisson, Piarrouty and Mazière to death. The court ordered the execution to take place in the town square of Hautefaye. Jean Campot benefited from a jury error (extenuating circumstances were accepted by six votes instead of the required seven), and was sentenced to forced labor for life in the penal colony of New Caledonia. The other defendants were sentenced to eight years' hard labor for the longest sentences, and one year's imprisonment for the lightest. One of the defendants, Thibaud Limay (known as Thibassou), was acquitted, but was sent to a reformatory until his twentieth birthday, due to his young age. On December 25, a few days after the end of the trial, the former mayor of Hautefaye, Bernard Mathieu—probably overcome by remorse—died in Charente.

On January 26, 1871, the appeal to the Supreme Court by the four men condemned to death was rejected, as was their request for a pardon, which reached the Ministry of Justice on January 30.

Initially, the guillotine was to be installed at the site of the former dried-up pond where Alain de Monéys had been immolated, but as the terrain was too uneven, the scaffold was erected in the cattle market on the morning of February 6. Executioner Jean-François Heidenreich was unable to travel, so his first assistant Nicolas Roch carried out the execution. The four condemned men were beheaded in the following order: Piarrouty first, then Buisson, Mazière, and finally Chambord.

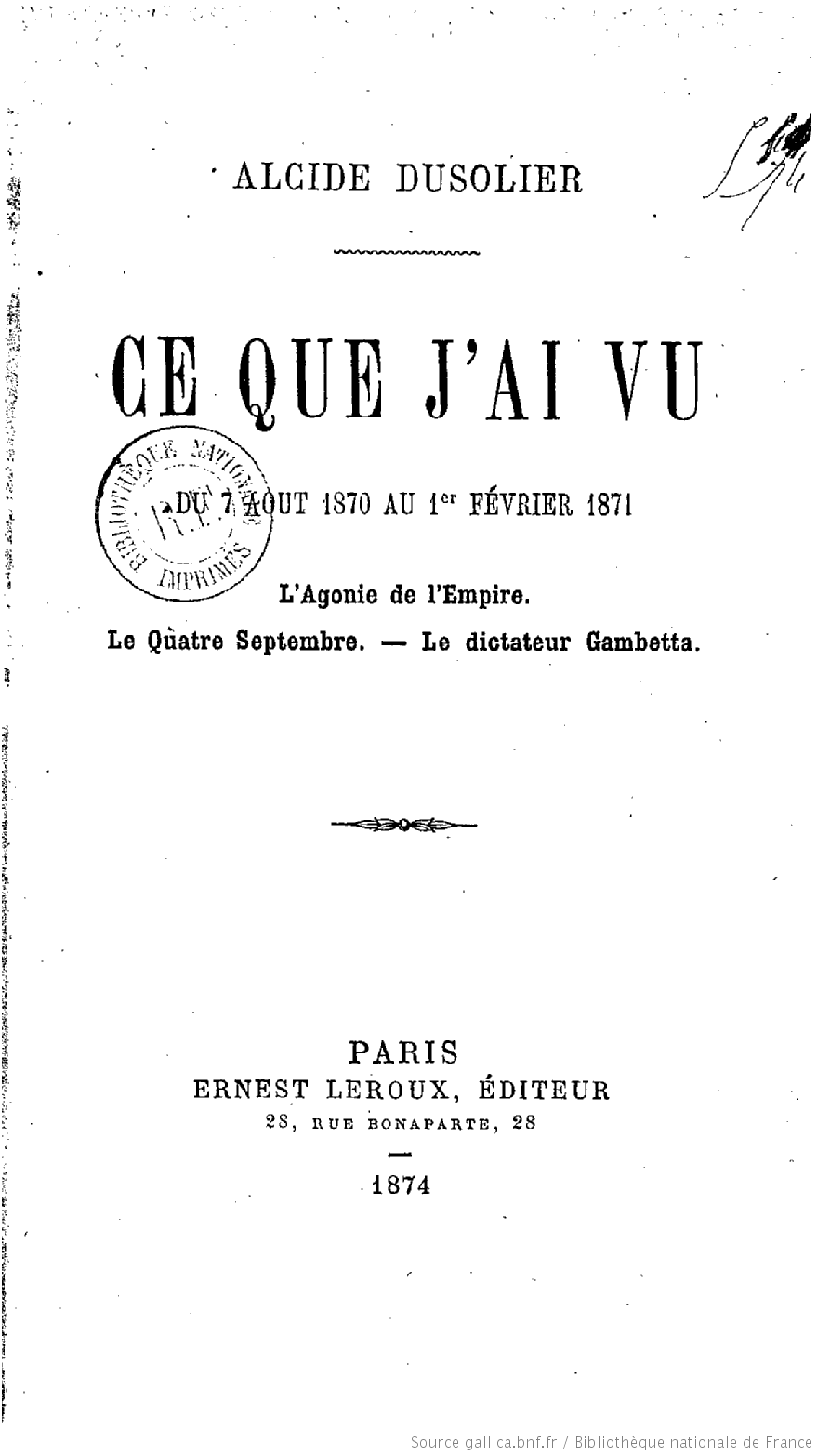
In Ce que j'ai vu, Alcide Dusolier is one of the first to revisit this affair (1874).

=== Commemoration ===
In 1953, Noémie Lavaud, the last living witness to the Hautefaye affair, died at the age of 92. A century after the affair, on August 16, 1970, a mass of forgiveness was celebrated in the church of Hautefaye in the presence of the victim's descendants and those of the four condemned to death. Francis Donnary, mayor of the village since 1977, proposed the erection of a commemorative stele to mark the event, but abandoned the project in 2009, "as there is still a sense of shame in this village".

== See also ==
- Lynching
- Hautefaye

== Bibliography ==
Documents used as a source for this article.

=== Historical documents ===
- Ponsac, Charles (1871). Le Crime d'Hautefaye: Assassinat de M. de Monéys brûlé vif par des paysans bonapartistes, vingt et un accusés, quatre exécutions capitales (in French). Impr. Viéville et Capiomont.
- Dusolier, Alcide (1874). Ce que j'ai vu du 7 août 1870 au 1er février 1871: L'Agonie de l'empire, le 4 septembre 1870-, le dictateur Gambetta (in French). Paris: Ernest Leroux.
- Marbeck, Georges (1983). Cent documents autour du drame de Hautefaye (in French). Périgueux: Pierre Fanlac. ISBN 2-86577-042-7.

=== Historical monographs ===
- Ruffray, Patrick de (1926). L'Affaire d'Hautefaye: Légende, histoire (in French). Angoulême: Impr. industrielle et commerciale.
- Marbeck, Georges (1982). Hautefaye: L'Année terrible (in French). Paris: Robert Laffont. ISBN 2-221-01056-6.
- Lormier, Dominique (1993). "4 Hautefaye : un aristocrate brûlé vif". Les Grands Crimes du Sud-Ouest (in French). Sud-Ouest. ISBN 2-87901-112-4..
- Corbin, Alain (1995). Le Village des " cannibales ". Histoire (in French). Paris: Flammarion. ISBN 2-08-081321-8.
- Gillot, Jean-Jacques; Audoux, Pascal (2011). Les Mystères du Périgord (in French). De Borée. ISBN 978-2-8129-0258-1.

=== Novels ===
- Massenet, Violaine (2008). Les Mangeurs de cendres (in French). Paris: Éditions de l'Archipel. ISBN 978-2-8098-0031-9..
- Teulé, Jean (2009). Mangez-le si vous voulez (in French). Paris: Julliard. ISBN 978-2-260-01772-1.
- Twist, L. M. (2024). Louis Mie and the Trial of Hautefaye. ISBN 979-8-9892182-1-9.

=== Comic strip ===
- Gelli, Dominique (2020). Mangez-le si vous voulez (d'après le roman de Jean Teulé). Mirages (in French). Delcourt. ISBN 978-2-413-01370-9..
