= Jean-Charles-Alphonse Avinain =

French murderer

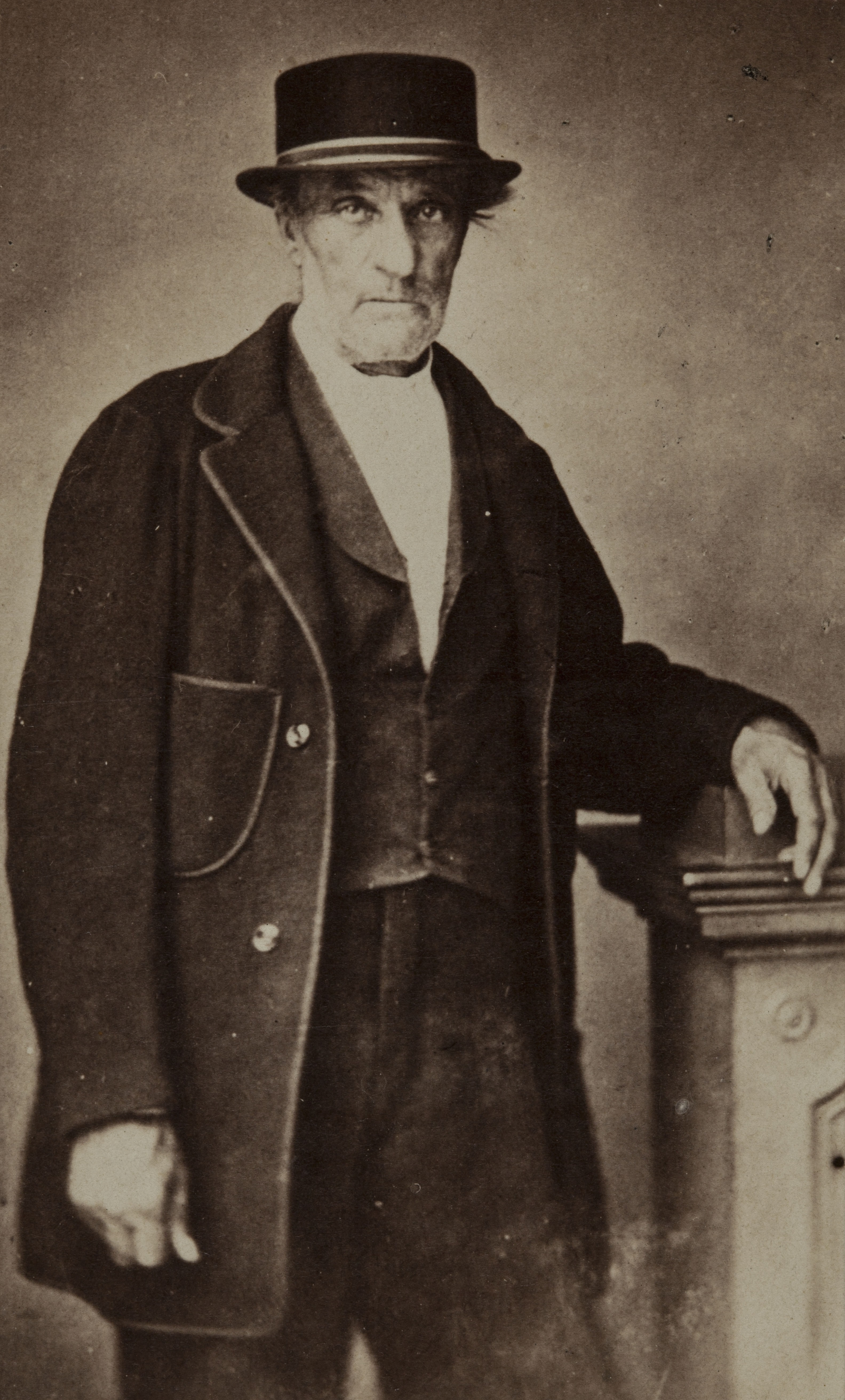
- Born: Jean-Charles-Alphonse Avinain dit Davinain; 14 October 1798; Torcy, Seine-et-Marne, France
- Died: 28 November 1867 (aged 69); Paris, France
- Cause of death: Execution by guillotine
- Conviction: Murder
- Penalty: Death

Details
- Victims: 2
- Span of crimes: March – June 1867
- Country: France

Jean-Charles-Alphonse Avinain dit Davinain (14 October 1798 – 28 November 1867), known as "The Terror of Gonesse" and "The Butcher of Clichy-la-Garenne", was a French criminal and murderer, found guilty of murdering two people. He became known for his quote: "Gentlemen, never confess! Never admit!"

== Biography ==
=== Youth ===
Jean-Charles-Alphonse Avinain was born on 14 October 1798, in Torcy. He was a soldier, who distinguished himself on two occasions: at the age of 15, he bravely fought against the Cossacks during the Invasion of France by Allied troops, and the second time as part of the Hundred Thousand Sons of Saint Louis in 1823.

By profession, he was a butcher, but Avinain eventually turned towards theft, which earned him six convictions. During his detention at the central house in Melun, he assisted in autopsies and thus learned how to dissect. He made a stay in the sinister Devil's Island, which Captain Dreyfus was to know a few decades later. After spending 18 years in the Cayenne prison, he returned to the Île-de-France in early 1867 at the age of 68, returning to Batignolles, the modest home in which his wife and daughter lived. They both welcomed him warmly.

Excited, his wife and daughter suggested he use his strength and intelligence for better purposes. He announced to them that he would go into the fodder business. When his daughter asked him with what money, he replied: "In Guiana, I sold for two years the wine I made and earned more, and I also found 1700 francs, hidden near the box of a politic who died on Devil's Island. The money was in hard cash, but a vivandiere exchanged it to me for bank notes." But such money did not exist.

Under false civil status associated with his first names, he had rented premises on the banks of the Seine, Levallois-Perret and Courbevoie. Avinain had discovered a trick that allowed him to rent for a few days without loose stock through temporary lease agreements.

=== Murders ===
In January 1867, he rented a warehouse under a false name in the district of Montaigne Avenue, where he unloaded his first cart. It was bought on the morning of 12 March for 50 francs on the Charenton market from a man named Lucien Leconte. Avinain delayed manoeuvres so well that unloading, when he had to pay, he announced that he did not have all the money on him and that he had to wait until the next morning. But Leconte was wary and did not close his one eye. Avinain did not dare to attack him and in the first hours of dawn left, on the pretext of fetching the missing francs.

From there his murders began. On 16 March 1867, Avinain was seen by several witnesses at the La Chapelle Market buying a load of one hundred bales of hay and three hundred bales of straw from a young grain merchant named Isidore Vincent and his wife. In the rented house in Courbevoie, he murdered Vincent, stealing his straw and hay afterwards.

On 19 March 1867, on the banks of the Seine on the Argenteuil side, workers saw a human body whose head and limbs were missing. The doctor who carried out the autopsy, Dr. Maurice, could not identify the victim. On the other hand, he was certain that the one who dismembered the victim was a butcher.

Dr. Maurice also showed his finding to the imperial police: the body belonged to a 25-year-old man; it was submerged some fifteen kilometres downstream; the death dated back to three days and was likely caused by strangulation accomplished four or five hours after the last meal. Provided with this information, the police let their finest bloodhounds on the killer's trail.

On the morning of 26 June, an old man named Duguet went to La Chapelle market with a cart loaded with fodder, pulled by a white horse. Avinain approached him, offering to sell his goods, and they both left the market towards Levallois-Perret. In Levallois, they stowed the cart and went to eat soup at the Mathon restaurant and drink wine. After that, they were seen strolling on the banks of the Seine. Avinain, after a busy day, convinced Duguet to accept his hospitality for the night. And it was during his sleep that Duguet was hit seventeen times with a hammer, beaten to death by Avinain.

=== The investigation ===
On 28 June 1867, in Saint-Ouen, a torso was discovered. And a few days later, the arms, legs and head of the corpse were also found. The dean of the Faculty of Medicine, Professor Auguste Ambroise Tardieu, was responsible for conducting the autopsy. His conclusions largely matched those of Dr. Maurice: the death was caused by strangulation, with additional violent blows to the head by a blunt object while the victim was asleep, who was then butchered. A few days after the discovery the victim was identified: he was a 75-year-old man named Duguet, a farmer from Longperrier.

The victim's white horse and cart were found; the former had been sold for four hundred francs to a man named Juquin, and the latter had been sold for forty francs to a cartwright-locksmith by a certain Jean Charles, a fodder merchant who lived in the city of Chasseurs. The investigators went to the address and discovered the man described by the witness, who was seen with Duguet. Avinain tried to escape through the sewers but was captured at the exit by police.

The searches then commenced. In Levallois-Perret, there were traces of blood and fodder belonging to Duguet were found. Despite the overwhelming evidence, Avinain denied his guilt, confusing magistrate Henriquez. The authorities promised him imperial grace only if he acknowledged his crimes, and he finally confessed.

=== The trial ===
On 2 October 1867, Avinain appeared before the cour d'assises of Seine, wearing a black frock coat and a white shirt plastron. He was defended by Master Massoni.

At the hearing on 26 October 1867, the Advocate General wrote to the jury: "If there were any of those humanitarian philosophers in this room who doubted the efficacy of the death penalty, I ask them to look at the man who is struggling at this bench, this man to attaches all his hope to perpetual punishment and exhausts himself in vain efforts to obtain a sentence that leaves him alive. May this terrible villain be treated without pity. I declare loudly that I intend to claim my share of responsibility in the inflexible verdict that you will make".

The president of the cour d'assises, Councilor Charles Berriat-Saint-Prix made the following statement: "Gentlemen jurors...I can not let you believe that, even if you dismiss the premeditation, Avinain would not incur death. Know indeed that under the terms of article 304 of the Penal Code, the murder carries the supreme punishment, when it had for object (...) to prepare, facilitate or execution of a simple crime, for example, that of flight".

But the prosecutor and the President of the cour d'assises drew attention to the "incurable perversity of the condemned and the atrocity of his crimes". Master Massoni wrote to Napoleon III on 23 November, and even Avinain himself sent a petition to the Emperor. However, nothing could be done: the date of execution was set to be on 27 November 1867.

=== The execution ===
Avinain was the only one to repulse with violence the Abbé Crozes, the chaplain of the convict depot at the La Roquette Prisons. Avinain said to him: "You are wasting your time, I do not believe in your fuss".

On 28 November 1867, the executioner was Jean-François Heidenreich, and the execution took place at the roundabout of Roquette, between the convict deposit and women's prison. The crowd that came to watch Avinain's execution would not see much, as there was too much fog. The assembly of the guillotine was done by the light of a battery of torches. Meanwhile, Mr. Claude, the police chief, came to wake up Avinain.

He put on his clothes and emptied the glass of wine handed to him by the prison's chaplain. After twenty days of resistance to the clergyman, Avinain finally confessed. He thanked Mr. Claude for his consideration, saying: "The world treated me too badly for me to regret leaving him. I am a man and will die a man". This did not prevent him from struggling with Heindenreich by insulting him but was quickly calmed down.

Avinain was treated to his exit. To the soldiers who made the hedge, he shouted: "Farewell, children of the fatherland!" And on the platform of the guillotine, facing a crowd he could not see, he said the words: "Gentlemen, never confess! Never admit!".

== Description ==
"He was no longer young, but he seemed solidly built. The lips clear, the nose pointed, the face glabrous, the bare forehead, a few tufts of gray hair at the temples, he would not have seemed distinct without his false eye deep in the orbit under thick black eyebrows".

== Posterity ==
The last sentence of Avinain, "Never admit!" has remained famous.

In Guillaume Apollinaire's erotic novel Les Onze Mille Verges, a verse reads as follows:

"Your hands will introduce my beautiful member Asinin In the sacred brothel open between your thighs And I want to admit you, despite Avinain, What makes your love as long as you enjoy!"

The famous lawyer René Floriot said: "Do not ever admit it" is an adverse legal advice, but still excellent in love.
