= The Sensational Past =

2017 book about 18th century Europe

The Sensational Past: How the Enlightenment Changed the Way We Use Our Senses
- Author: Carolyn Purnell
- Subject: Sensory history; The Enlightenment
- Genre: History
- Publisher: W.W. Norton & Co.
- Publication date: February 7, 2017
- Pages: 288
- ISBN: 978-0-393-24937-8
- Website: The Sensational Past

The Sensational Past: How the Enlightenment Changed the Way We Use Our Senses is a 2017 book by Carolyn Purnell on Enlightenment-era history of the senses.

The Sensational Past was published by W.W. Norton on February 7, 2017. The 288-page book is organized in ten chapters on different aspects of ideas about sensory experience and the role senses played in social life, culture and science from 1690 to 1830, with the focus on interest in bodily sensation serving as a corrective to "modern notions of the Enlightenment as being entirely concerned with rational rigor, logic and the scientific method." Writing in the Wall Street Journal, historian Mark Smith described The Sensational Past as "a brisk, jaunty and at times witty romp through the history of the senses in the long 18th century, filled with entertaining examples."
