= Alain Corbin =

French historian (born 1936)

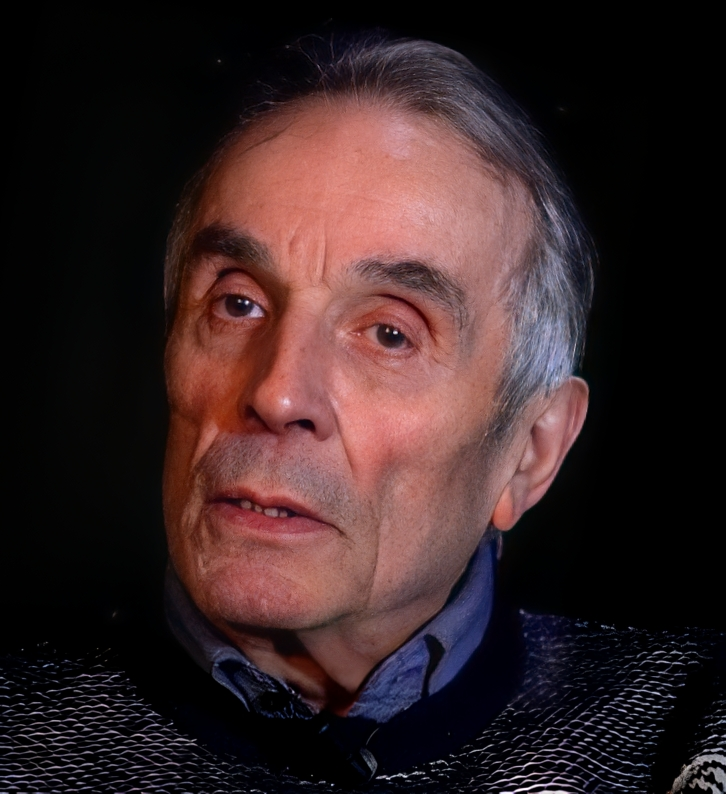
- Alain Corbin (2020)
- Born: January 12, 1936 (age 90); Courtomer, Orne, French Third Republic
- Citizenship: France
- Occupations: Historian, Professor of contemporary history
- Years active: 1959—2005
- Notable work: Prélude au Front populaire. Contribution à l’histoire de l’opinion publique dans le département de la Haute-Vienne (1934–1936)(1968); Archaïsme et modernité en Limousin au XIXe siècle. (1845-1880) (1975); Les Filles de noce : Misère sexuelle et prostitution au XIXe siècle (1978); Le Miasme et la Jonquille : L’odorat et l’imaginaire social (XVIIIe-XIXe siècles) (1988); Le territoire du vide: L'occident et le désir du rivage (1750-1840) (1988); Le village des "cannibales" (1986); Le cloches de la terre: Paysage sonore et culture sensible dans les campagnes au XIXe siècle (1994); Le temps, le désir et l'horreur (1995); Le monde retrouvé de Louis-François Pinagot: Sur les traces d'un inconnu (1798-1876) (1998); La pluie, le soleil et le vent: Une histoire de la sensibilité au temps qu'il fait, Aubier (2013); Histoire buissonnière de la pluie, Flammarion (2017); Histoire du silence: de la Renaissance à nos jours (2018); Terra Incognita: Une histoire de l'ignorance (2020)
- Partner: Simone Delattre (since 2012)

Alain Corbin (born January 12, 1936, in Courtomer) is a French historian. He is a specialist of the 19th century in France and in microhistory.

Trained in the Annales School, Corbin's work has moved away from the large-scale collective structures studied by Fernand Braudel towards a history of sensibilities which is closer to Lucien Febvre's history of mentalités. His books have explored the histories of such subjects as male desire and prostitution, sensory experience of smell and sound, and the 1870 burning of a young nobleman in a Dordogne village.

== Early life and education ==
Alain Corbin was born on January 12, 1936, in Courtomer, Orne, France. His father was a rural physician, born in the French Caribbean in 1901, who studied medicine in Paris before establishing practice in Normandy in the 1920s, while his mother was a native of the Norman bocage. In september 1937, the family moved to Guadeloupe but returned to France in March 1938 due to difficulties adapting to the climate and after Corbin suffered from severe malaria. They settled in Lonlay-l’Abbaye, a small medieval town in the Orne, located in a deeply Catholic rural environment marked by the bocage landscape.

Corbin spent his childhood in Normandy during the Second World War, an experience that strongly marked his early memories. In June 1940, his family fled south during the German advance and travelled to Bayonne. After a short stay in Boucau, they were blocked at the demarcation line in Limousin, where they were sheltered by local farmers in the Monts d’Ambazac, whom Corbin would later study in his doctoral research. Upon returning to the north, their home was initially occupied by German troops and throughout the occupation, German military presence became a regular feature of Corbin’s daily life, including training exercises conducted at his school and the billeting of soldiers in nearby properties. In the summer of 1944, Corbin even experienced the Battle of Normandy at close range by being displaced to the countryside and taking refuge in trenches dug by local farmers. He also witnessed the arrival of American forces during the Liberation. He later recalled vivid sensory memories of this period, marked by fear under the constant threat of bombardments and mines, strong visual impressions, lingering smells of destruction and clear memories of sounds, particularly of aircraft, which he noted were hard to fully capture in later reconstructions and which contributed to his interest in sensory experience in historical writing.

He completed his primary education at the Sacré-Cœur school in Domfront from 1945 to 1952 before continuing his secondary education at the Immaculé-Conception school in Flers-de-l’Orne until the age of sixteen in 1952. Largely educated at home in his early years, he learned to read, write and count before entering school and was admitted directly to secondary education at the age of nine. Because hospitals were distant, Corbin also witnessed patients frequently coming to the family home to receive medical care, including minor surgical procedures. Although this environment did not encourage Corbin to pursue a medical career like his father, observing his father and accompanying him in his visits introduced Corbin at an early age to rural medicine, which later led him to make extensive use of medical discourse in his writing. This formative environment also allowed him to discover the countryside through his father’s interactions with rural residents and contributed to his later interest in rural life and everyday practices, which influenced some of his work. He later described his childhood as taking place in a very nineteenth-century atmosphere due to his father’s practice of rural medicine but also due to the farmers and landscapes of Normandy.

After years in a strictly disciplined Catholic school and after obtaining his baccalaureate, Corbin’s father suggested that he enter the literary preparatory classes but Corbin insisted on pursuing more flexible studies to move away from the standard rigid academic path. Between 1952 and 1953, he prepared the propédeutique at the Sorbonne and the Institut catholique where he studied philosophy, history, French and English. After failing the examination, he continued his university studies at the University of Caen from 1953 to 1959. There, he prepared a history degree within a relatively light curriculum, which allowed him significant time for independent reading and was not very politically engaged. Reflecting on his educational path, Corbin described his academic trajectory as atypical compared with that of most Sorbonne professors.

In 1963, he married Annie Lagorce with whom he had two children. In 2012, he married Simone Delattre, also French historian and specialist of the 19th century in France.

== Academic career ==
After passing the agrégation, Alain Corbin taught history at the Lycée Gay-Lussac in Limoges from 1959 to 1967. His early experience in secondary education was soon interrupted by compulsory military service.

In 1960, Corbin was directly conscripted and sent to Algeria, where he served for twenty-seven months during the Algerian War. He initially served as an enlisted man and later held administrative and organizational duties, completing his military service with the rank of brigadier-chef. He returned to civilian life in 1962 and resumed his teaching career at the Lycée Gay-Lussac.

While continuing to teach in secondary education, Corbin continued his academic research. In 1968, he defended a doctoral thesis entitled Prélude au Front populaire. Contribution à l’histoire de l’opinion publique dans le département de la Haute-Vienne (1934–1936). Conducted under the guidance of Georges Castellan at the University of Poitiers, this research was based on an oral history study that included approximately 200 interviews with surviving voters from the 1936 elections. The thesis represented one of the early uses of oral inquiry in French contemporary history.

After being appointed assistant at the newly created collège universitaire littéraire of Limoges, he was recruited as lecturer at the University of Tours by Jacques Ozouf in 1969, marking his entry into higher education.

He then prepared a State doctorate under the supervision of Bertrand Gille. His dissertation, defended in 1973, examined the Limousin region in the nineteenth century and focused on the social, demographic and political contrasts between migrant and sedentary populations. The thesis was originally titled Limousins migrants, Limousins sédentaires. Contribution à l'histoire de la région limousine au XIXe siècle (1845-1880) and was later published under the title Archaïsme et modernité en Limousin au XIXe siècle. (1845-1880)

He later pursued his university career in Paris and was appointed professor of contemporary history at Paris 1 Panthéon-Sorbonne, where he taught until his retirement. He was also member of the Institut universitaire de France from 1992 to 2002.

== Contributions to the history of the senses and representations ==
Alain Corbin is a central figure in the development of the Sensory history and the study of social representations in modern historiography. He has consistently defended the legitimacy of studying sensory perception, affects and imagination as historical objects, emphasising that sensory experience is historically and socially constructed. He was even labeled a historian of the senses in Historien du sensible (2000), a book-length interview with Gilles Heuré, which reflects the importance of his contribution to this approach.

Several of his works illustrate this approach. In Women for Hire : Prostitution and Sexuality in France after 1850 (Les Filles de noce : Misère sexuelle et prostitution au XIXe siècle), Corbin remained within social history but shifted the focus from prostitution as an institution to the expressions of desire, emotions and moral judgment surrounding prostitutes, showing how representations influenced sexual practices. In The Foul and the Fragrant : Odor and the French Social Imagination (Le Miasme et la Jonquille : L’odorat et l’imaginaire social (XVIIIe-XIXe siècles), he pioneered an olfactory history, examining not the smells themselves but the social meanings attached to odor to show how olfactory references influenced how people were perceived and, by the late nineteenth century, contributed to racialized ways of thinking.

Corbin also studied how sensory pleasure developed over time. The Lure of the Sea :The Discovery of the Seaside in the Western World, 1750-1840 (Le Territoire du vide : L’Occident et le désir du rivage, 1750-1840) analyzed the emergence of the seaside as a place of pleasure, demonstrating how this desire for the shore grew through cultural and social influences such as literature and later encouraged economic and industrial developments, thus linking sensory history to the history of technology and infrastructure. In Village Bells: Sound and Meaning in the 19th century French Countryside (Les Cloches de la terre : paysage sonore et culture sensible dans les campagnes au XIXe siècle), he examined changing perceptions of sound, showing how church bells once sacralized space, organised social life and affected collective emotional responses before gradually losing this role.

In The Village of Cannibals: Rage and Murder in France, 1870 (Le Village des « cannibales »), he analysed a rural murder committed in Hautefaye in 1870 by showing how long-standing representations, collective emotions such as fear and shared imaginaries influenced political violence, demonstrating the contribution of history of the senses to political history and highlighting the role of rumour in the history of representations.

Corbin also contributed to microhistory through The Life of an Unknown : The Rediscovered World of a Clog Maker in the Nineteenth-century France (Le Monde retrouvé de Louis-François Pinagot : Sur les traces d’un inconnu (1798-1876), a study of an anonymous nineteenth-century rural clog maker who left almost no personal records. Rather than a general history of rural life, Corbin offered a subjective reconstruction that shows how individuals otherwise absent from historical records may have experienced their time.

== Works ==
- Les filles de noce: Misère sexuelle et prostitution au XIXe siècle, 1978
  - Translation: Women for Hire: Prostitution and Sexuality in France after 1850, (published 1996)
- Le territoire du vide: L'occident et le désir du rivage (1750-1840), 1988
  - Translation: The Lure of the Sea: The Discovery of the Seaside in the Western World, 1750-1840, (published 1994)
- Le miasme et la jonquille: L'odorat et l'imaginaire social, XVIIIe-XIXe siècles, 1982
  - Translation: The Foul and the Fragrant: Odor and the French Social Imagination), (published 1988)
- Le village des "cannibales", 1986
  - Translation: The Village of Cannibals: Rage and Murder in France, 1870, (published 1993)
- Le cloches de la terre: Paysage sonore et culture sensible dans les campagnes au XIXe siècle, 1994
  - Translation: Village Bells: Sound and Meaning in the 19th-century French Countryside, (published 1998)
- Le temps, le désir et l'horreur, 1995
  - Translation: Time, Desire, and Horror: Towards a History of the Senses, (published 1995)
- Le monde retrouvé de Louis-François Pinagot: Sur les traces d'un inconnu (1798-1876), 1998
  - Translation: The Life of an Unknown: The Rediscovered World of a Clog Maker in Nineteenth-century France, (published 2001)
- La pluie, le soleil et le vent: Une histoire de la sensibilité au temps qu'il fait, Aubier, 2013
- Histoire buissonnière de la pluie, Flammarion, 2017
- Histoire du silence: de la Renaissance à nos jours, 2018
  - Translation: A History of Silence: From the Renaissance to the Present Day, (published 2018)
- Terra Incognita: Une histoire de l'ignorance, 2020
  - Translation: Terra Incognita: A History of Ignorance in the 18th and 19th Centuries, (published 2021)

== Bibliography ==
- For a general overview on his work, see S. Godfrey "Alain Corbin : Making Sense of French History », French Historical Studies, vol. 25, n° 2, 2002, p. 381-398
- See also Dominique Kalifa, "L’expérience, le désir et l’histoire. Alain Corbin ou le tournant culturel silencieux", in “Alain Corbin and the writing of History”, French Politics, Culture & Society, vol. 22, n° 2, 2004, p. 14-25.
- Corbin, Alain. Historien du sensible : Entretiens avec Gilles Heuré. Paris, La Découverte. « Cahiers libres », (2000)
