= Mark M. Smith =

American historian and professor

- Education: University of Southampton (BA); University of South Carolina (MA, PhD)
- Occupation: Historian

Mark M. Smith is an American historian and the Carolina Distinguished Professor of History at the University of South Carolina. Smith holds a B.A. University of Southampton (1988) & M.A. University of South Carolina (1991) and a Ph.D. University of South Carolina (1995). Smith is a scholar of sensory history, which he described to an interviewer as stressing “the role of the senses—including sight and vision—in shaping people's experiences in the past and shows how they understood their worlds and why.”

== Books ==
- 1997. Mastered by the Clock: Time, Slavery, and Freedom in the American South (co-winner of the Organization of American Historians' 1998 Avery O. Craven Award and South Carolina Historical Society's Book of the Year)
- 1998. Debating Slavery: Economy and Society in the Antebellum American South. Cambridge University Press
- 2000. The Old South, (as editor). Oxford: Blackwell
- 2001. Listening to Nineteenth-Century America. Chapel Hill: University of North Carolina Press
- 2004. Hearing History: a reader, (as editor). Athens: University of Georgia Press
- 2005. "Stono: Documenting and Interpreting a Southern Slave Revolt". Columbia: University of South Carolina Press
- 2006. How Race is Made: Slavery, Segregation, and the Senses. Chapel Hill: University of North Carolina Press
- 2007. "Sensing the Past: Seeing, Hearing, Smelling, Tasting, and Touching, and Touching in History". Berkeley: University of California Press
- 2007. "Sensory History". Oxford: Berg
- 2015. "The Smell of Battle, the Taste of Siege: A Sensory History of the Civil War". New York: Oxford University Press
- 2021. "A Sensory History Manifesto". University Park, PA: Pennsylvania State University Press

Also:

* 2020. Boddice, Rob, and Mark M. Smith. Emotion, Sense, Experience. Cambridge University Press; 2020.

== Public Humanities ==
He is the host and creator of the podcast "Take on the South, produced by the Institute for Southern Studies at the University of South Carolina.
