= Hautefaye =

- Commune
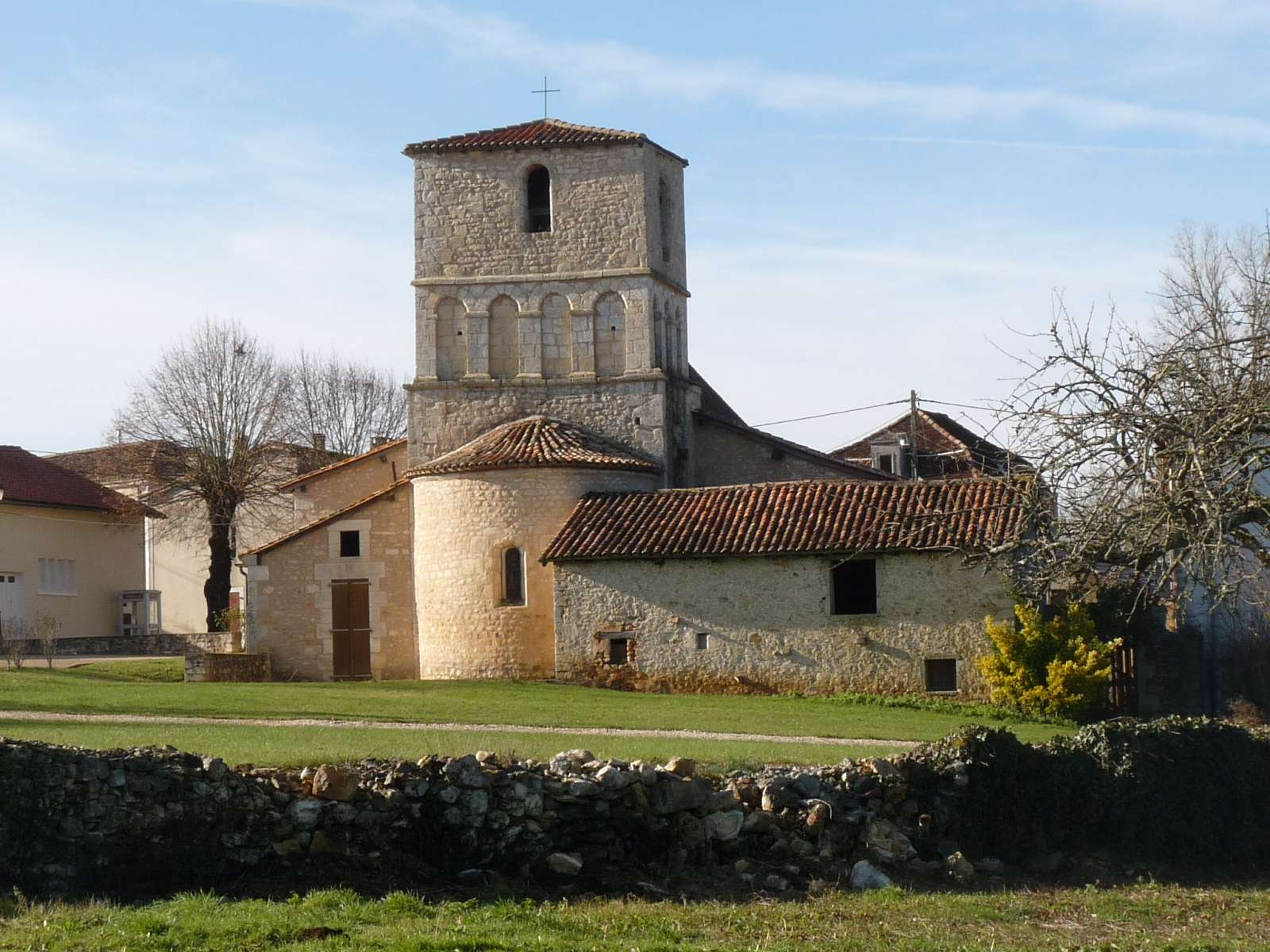
- The church in Hautefaye
- Location of Hautefaye
- Location within France Location within Nouvelle-Aquitaine
- Coordinates: 45°32′15″N 0°29′39″E
- Country: France
- Region: Nouvelle-Aquitaine
- Department: Dordogne
- Arrondissement: Nontron
- Canton: Périgord Vert Nontronnais

Government
  - Mayor (2022–2026): Jean Manguy
- Area^{1}: 12.47 km^{2} (4.81 sq mi)
- Highest elevation: 206 m (676 ft)
- Lowest elevation: 139 m (456 ft)
- Population (2023): 123
  - Density: 9.86/km^{2} (25.5/sq mi)
- Time zone: UTC+01:00 (CET)
  - Summer (DST): UTC+02:00 (CEST)
- INSEE/Postal code: 24209 /24300
- ^{1} French Land Register data, which excludes lakes, ponds, glaciers > 1 km^{2} (0.386 sq mi or 247 acres) and river estuaries.

Hautefaye (French pronunciation: [otfaj]; Occitan: Autafaia) is a commune in the Dordogne department in Nouvelle-Aquitaine in south-western France. It gained particular notoriety for a mob attack and murder of an innocent man, Alain de Moneys, at the time of the Franco-Prussian War, in mid-August 1870.

== History ==
=== Killing of Alain de Monéys ===
On 16 August 1870, France was losing the war against Prussia. Within three weeks, Emperor Napoleon III would be captured by the enemy and his regime overthrown by a self-proclaimed Government for National Defence.

Rural France, which had largely been faithful to Napoleon I and welcomed his nephew, was tense. Many rural residents were illiterate and depended upon news of the war from educated, often noble residents, which they resented.

During a fair at Hautefaye, matters turned ugly when an aristocratic cousin of a young nobleman named Alain de Monéys reported the war was not going well. Many villagers had been drinking and received the news poorly. They attacked the cousin, the Vicomte Camille Maillard Lafaye, son of the mayor of the nearby town of Beaussac. Frightened, the viscount and his party fled. In an alcohol-fueled patriotic fervor, villagers wielding pitchforks and cudgels turned their attention on young Alain.

They accused him of being a Prussian plant, a spy, and of financing Prussia in the war against France. They claimed he betrayed the emperor and nation. Both claims were in fact false, as Monéys was not a Republican and his patriotism was spotless, but a crowd gathered around him. The parish priest tried to calm the mob by offering drinks to divert their attention but, however well-meaning the effort may have been, it probably made the crowd even more intoxicated than they already were and more dangerous. The mayor, unable to show leadership in the face of drunken excitement, reportedly said "Eat him if you want".

For two hours, the mob tortured and battered Alain de Monéys. They nailed horseshoes to his feet and burst one of his eyeballs. The crowd finally burnt him in the village square (or a nearby lake bed), likely while still alive. It is alleged that those who took part in the killing collected fat dripping from his burning body onto bread, eating the resulting tartines. (The last statement has not been proved historical).

==== Judgment ====
Some 600 festival attendees were implicated in the affair. On 19 August 1870, gendarmes arrested fifty people ranging in age from age 14 through 60.

On 18 September 1870, twenty-one defendants were informed of charges against them.

During 13–21 December 1870, perpetrators were brought to trial in the town of Périgueux. Nineteen were convicted, four sentenced to death. Judge Brochon, from the Bourdeaux Court of Appeals, presided over the Dordogne Criminal Court in this instance. Altogether, four individuals were judged to have primary culpability and sentenced to death, while another received a sentence of life imprisonment. Others received sentences ranging from six to eight years imprisonment with hard labour for their role in the atrocity. Another group was sentenced to a single year of imprisonment. One teenager, then aged fourteen years of age, was sentenced to six years in a reformatory, while a small child was acquitted.

On 6 February 1871, the four participants judged most complicit for the murder of Monéys were guillotined in the Hautefaye village square.

==== Aftermath ====
In 1953, Lavaud Noemie, the last direct witness of the Hautefaye Affair, died at 92 years of age.

On 16 August 1970, a century after the tragedy and at the initiative of one of the villagers, the Hautefaye church held a "Mass of forgiveness" in the presence of descendants of the family of Alain of Monéys and those of his killers.

Jean Teule has since written an historical novel on the subject, Eat Him if You Like (2009: English Translation: 2011).

L.M. Twist wrote a historical novel on the event, Louis Mie and the Trial of Hautefaye (2024).

== Population ==
Historical population
Year	Pop.	±% p.a.
1968	169	—
1975	146	−2.07%
1982	144	−0.20%
1990	129	−1.37%
1999	116	−1.17%
2007	113	−0.33%
2012	122	+1.54%
2017	136	+2.20%
2023	123	−1.66%
Source: INSEE

== See also ==
- Communes of the Dordogne department
- The Hautefaye case
