= Sensory history =

Academic study of the senses in history

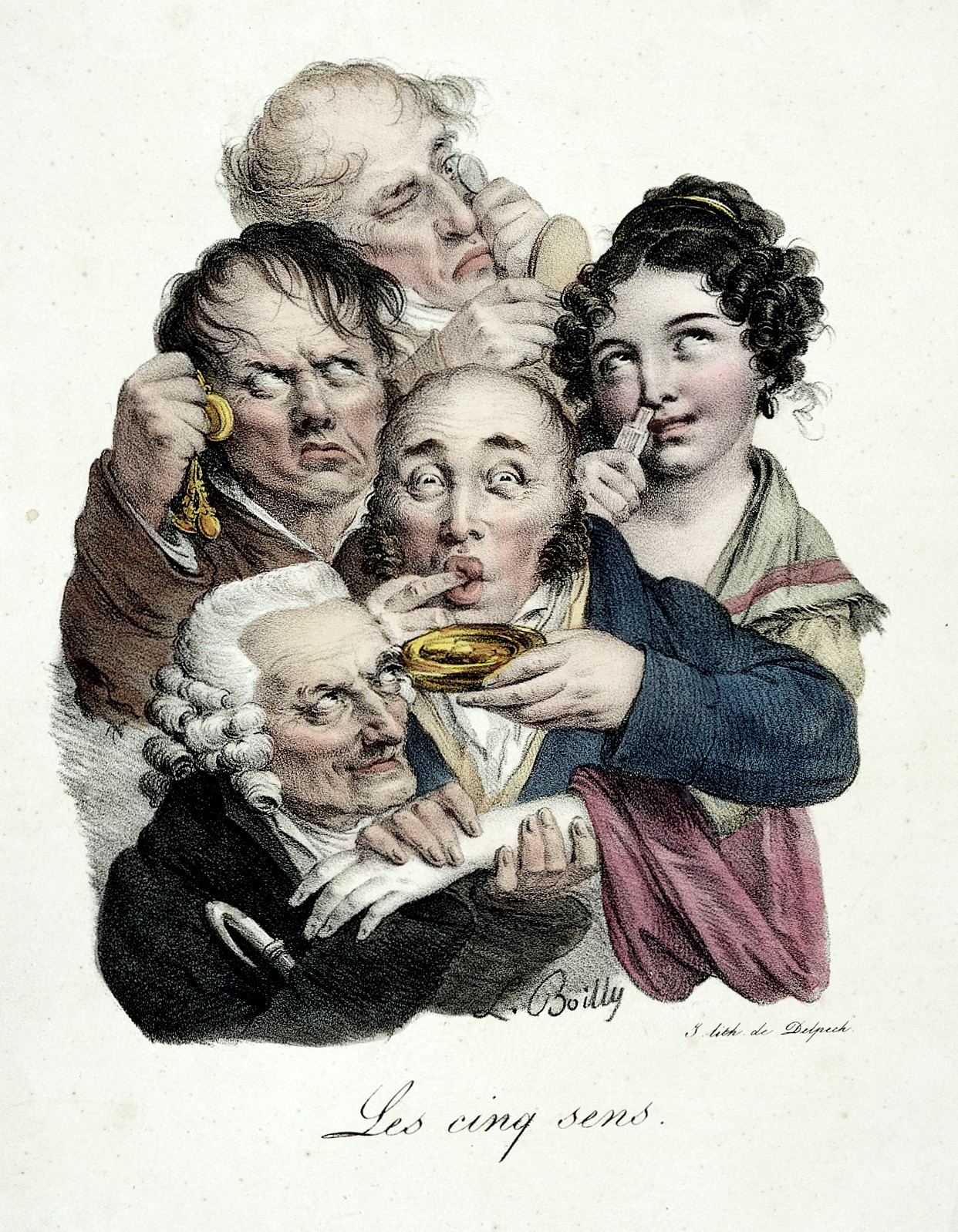
Five people, each exercising one of the five senses. Coloured lithograph after L.-L. Boilly.

Sensory history is an area of academic study which examines the role conceptions of our senses have played in the past. It developed partly as a reaction to the lack of serious attention given to sensory experience in traditional history books, which often treat sensory experience as a writing technique rather than a serious avenue of enquiry. Works of sensory history try to convey a deeper understanding of the past through an emphasis on physical experiences.

One of the most significant proponents of sensory history is the American historian Mark M. Smith. Anthropological approaches to sensory studies have had a notable influence on sensory history and there has been significant discussion and overlap between the two disciplines. The transient nature of sensory experience makes sensory history a difficult topic to study and write about. This challenge is reflected in debate within the field, such as what methods of presentation are appropriate for works of sensory history.

== History ==
Karl Marx drew attention to the possibility of sensory history in The Economic and Philosophic Manuscripts of 1844, in which he stated that "the forming of the five senses is a labour of the entire history of the world down to the present." In 1942 Lucien Febvre, a French historian and one of the founders of the Annales School, called for the history of sensibilities to be examined and so is credited as one of the first historians to consider the senses as a legitimate historical field of study.

The development of sensory history has also been influenced by other academic disciplines, such as philosophy and anthropology. The idea that sight is the most important sense of the modern era was particularly argued by philosopher Michel Foucault. Philosophers Marshall McLuhan and Walter J. Ong expanded on this idea in their theory of 'the great divide'. The theory claims that the invention of the printing press caused a fundamental shift in how people used their senses – from hearing being the most important sense, to sight. The concept of the pre-eminence of sight in the modern world, has also prompted a particular focus on the other four senses in works of sensory history in order to readdress this inequality. Anthropologists such as David Howes and Constance Classen have also made significant contributions to the study of sensory history, particularly in regards to the importance of context in sensory histories, through their work within the broader field of sensory studies.

Historian Alain Corbin produced one of the first books focussing exclusively on sensory history in 1982, The Foul and the Fragrant: Odor and the French Social Imagination, a discussion on the role of smell in 18th and 19th century France. In 1994 George H. Roeder wrote the essay Coming to Our Senses, which claimed that historical studies were still lacking in engagement with the senses, particularly history textbooks. The historian who has most represented sensory history in the 21st century is Mark M. Smith, who has written both a book on the subject of sensory history itself and books which examine historical events through the senses.

== Method ==
Sensory history is often written because of a significant lack of any examination of the sensory in a particular historical area previously. This means that sensory historians can simply re-examine primary and secondary sources, with a lens for the sensory, in order to support their work. Historian Mark M. Smith refers to sensory history as a 'habit' that can be used across many fields of historical study. Historicising the senses is an important concept for sensory historians when conducting research, and this means considering the senses in their historical context while putting aside more modern conceptions of the senses. This concept lies at the heart of many sensory histories because if accounts of sensory experience cannot be taken at face-value then a more rigorous examination is required. The idea of historicising the senses is significantly influenced by sensory anthropological studies. Sensory history is a field which lends itself to inter-disciplinary cooperation with fields such as anthropology and media studies.

Because sensory history concerns itself with the sensory experiences of individuals, it is linked to the notion of 'bottom up' history, which focusses on the lives of ordinary people throughout history.

=== Inter-sensoriality ===
Inter-sensoriality (also spelt intersensoriality) is a word used by sensory historians to describe one of the goals of sensory history, which is to consider the five senses together and how they work in concert. Works of history which consider the whole inter-sensoriality of a subject aim to provide a more complete and engaging perspective on history. Historians of food, long wedded to an approach that privileged taste (both as a property of individual foods and as a means of social distinction in matters culinary), now give a pride of place to all five senses when analysing goods, dishes, and meals. They also describe how the industrialisation of food production went hand in hand with the ways in which attention to the senses helped invent, formulate, and produce goods like tin-cans, cheeses or convenience foods (tv dinners) that were acceptable and appealing to consumers' eyes, noses, ears, teeth, and tongues. In doing so, they pay special attention to social class, gender, and other organising principles of society.

== Challenges ==
The question of how to present sensory history is a significant challenge. Sensory experience is in nature transient, so historians must consider how best to represent and discuss this. A further challenge for sensory historians when conducting sensory history is how to access sensory experiences of the past. Written descriptions of sensory experiences are numerous and often used, but some historians take this further and attempt to recreate past sensory experiences, in the hope that by experiencing it themselves they can better understand the past. In regards to this dilemma, historian Alain Corbin states that the historian is always a "prisoner of language" when investigating the past.

== Debate ==
The method of presentation of sensory history has been a significant topic of debate in the field of sensory history. Historians such as Peter Charles Hoffer place priority upon the communication of their work to their audience. This can involve more creative methods of presentation, such as living museums or interactive exhibitions, in order for the audience to more deeply experience and understand the past. Other historians, such as Mark M. Smith, disagree with this method of presentation, as priority is placed upon the historicity of the senses. Smith contends that how people sense now is fundamentally different from how people sensed in the past, based on factors such as location and context. He argues that presentations of sensory history such as living museums undermine the integrity of sensory history, as they suggest that a person is able to experience the past in the same way that those who lived the experience did, regardless of their fundamentally different contexts and places unnecessary importance on the 'consumption' of the past. However, more recent work by William Tullett has argued that using our senses in the present to engage with sensory reconstructions of the past can be a useful comparative exercise that sheds light on the continuities and differences between contemporary and past sensory experiences.

Another significant debate in relation to sensory history is the relevance of the 'great divide' theory, as presented in The Gutenberg Galaxy by Marshall McLuhan, to the study of sensory history. Sensory historians give varying degrees of importance to this theory.

== The senses ==
=== Touch ===
Touch has historically been included as one of the 'lower' senses, that is, not requiring any skill of the mind to be used. German naturalist Lorenz Oken characterised Africans as the uncivilised "skin-man," as opposed to the civilised European "eye-man," thus utilising touch to support racist ideology. As a result of this view of touch as a 'lower' and 'uncivilised' sense, serious historical analysis of the role touch has played in the past was lacking until the end of the 20th century, when interest in sensory history first 'boomed'. Histories of touch naturally lend themselves to a history of sexuality, but touch is also central to histories of Christian practices. For example, in renaissance and early modern England debates ranged from the role of the kiss in Christian practices to the legitimacy of the 'royal touch', which was reputed to heal the sick. Additionally, the sense of touch is such an integral part of everyday life and experience that it is not often referred to explicitly in historical sources, and so is an "inferred history" as named by historian Constance Classen.

=== Hearing ===
One of the first sensory histories dealing with the sense of hearing is Village Bells: Sound and Meaning in the Nineteenth-century French Countryside by Alain Corbin, which examines the meanings embedded in the sound of bells in 19th century French villages. The study of cities, particularly with regards to industrialisation, is a common topic of histories of sound or hearing. For example, the term 'soundscape' often refers to both the sounds of the physical environment inhabited, and how these sounds are perceived, especially in regard to how the soundscapes of certain cities change, and how this change affects its citizens. This necessarily draws upon inter-disciplinary research in the fields of soundscapes, sound studies and urban history. The historian Mark M. Smith has suggested the term "acoustemology" as a title for this field of study. Of particular importance in this topic is the invention of recording methods, which some historians have argued was a pivotal turning point in the history of the sense of hearing and radically changed society's relationship with the sense of hearing. Scholars such as Jonathan Sterne, have offered a critique of this narrative by showing that many new forms of listening associated with recording and playback technologies preceded the invention and popularisation of recorded sound. Additionally, how people's relative perception and sensitivity to sound has changed is of particular interest. The focus of this research has been on the regulation of, campaigning against, and association of social groups with urban noise.

=== Smell ===
Perfumer Eugène Rimmel stated in the 19th century that "the history of perfume is, in some manner, that of civilisation." Rarely has the sense of smell been given any prominence in the study of history, which partly stems from the difficulty the English language poses in describing olfactory sensations. Aristotle first pointed this out in De Anima, and it is continually seen in the reliance upon words related to flavour when describing smells. A more common description of smells is simply distinguishing whether the smell is pleasurable or not. Smell is historically considered one of the ‘lower’ senses (like touch and taste) as it is linked to animals who often have a keener sense of smell than humans. The sense of smell is also generally considered to be an undervalued sense, particularly in Western societies. This perspective also stems somewhat from the philosopher Immanual Kant who stated that it was the "least rewarding" and "most easily dispensable sense." In Alain Corbin's book The Foul and the Fragrant, he argues that the sense of smell is inherently tied to social power, as historically certain groups of people have been rendered as 'lesser' because of lack of hygiene.

=== Taste ===
The history of taste is traditionally tied to food history and food studies, however sensory histories of taste attempt to analyse this sense throughout history more broadly and to expand beyond gastronomy. As the sense of taste is intrinsically connected to the act of eating, so the history of taste is necessarily tied to morality and the sin of gluttony, and also therefore the history of the Christian church. Taste is historically considered a lower sense, particularly as it requires physical contact with the subject of the tasting.

=== Sight ===
Sight has historically been considered one of the 'higher' senses as it is linked to reading and use of the mind. It has also been associated with the higher classes of society whose jobs do not involve manual labour, as opposed to the lower classes who have even been referred to as simply "hands". This is also reflected in the use of the term 'Dark Ages' and the 'Enlightenment' to describe the period of history in which minimal progress was made as opposed to the period when the foundations of modern thought were built. Due to this supposed supremacy, particularly within the sensory hierarchy of the west, there is no dearth of visual analysis in the practice of traditional history writing. Visual sources such as photographs and paintings are frequently utilised as important sources in historical works. In his essay, When Seeing Makes Scents, Mark M. Smith argues that these visual sources can be mined for information about the other four senses in order to gain a more complete understanding of past sensory experiences.

== Significant works ==
In the ‘boom’ of sensory history during the late 20th and early 21st century, many significant works have been produced within the field of sensory history. Historian Mark M. Smith has written the introductory book Sensory History and a sensory history of the American Civil War in The Smell of Battle and the Taste of Siege. A series of books titled The Cultural History of the Senses surveys the role the five senses has played from antiquity to the modern age through a variety of essays on the subject. Additionally in Empire of the Senses: a Cultural Reader, David Howes has selected essays which represent a large cross-section of the field. For the renewal of food history that goes beyond taste to embrace the other senses, see Vabre, Bruegel, Atkins (2021).
