= Souffrignac =

- Commune
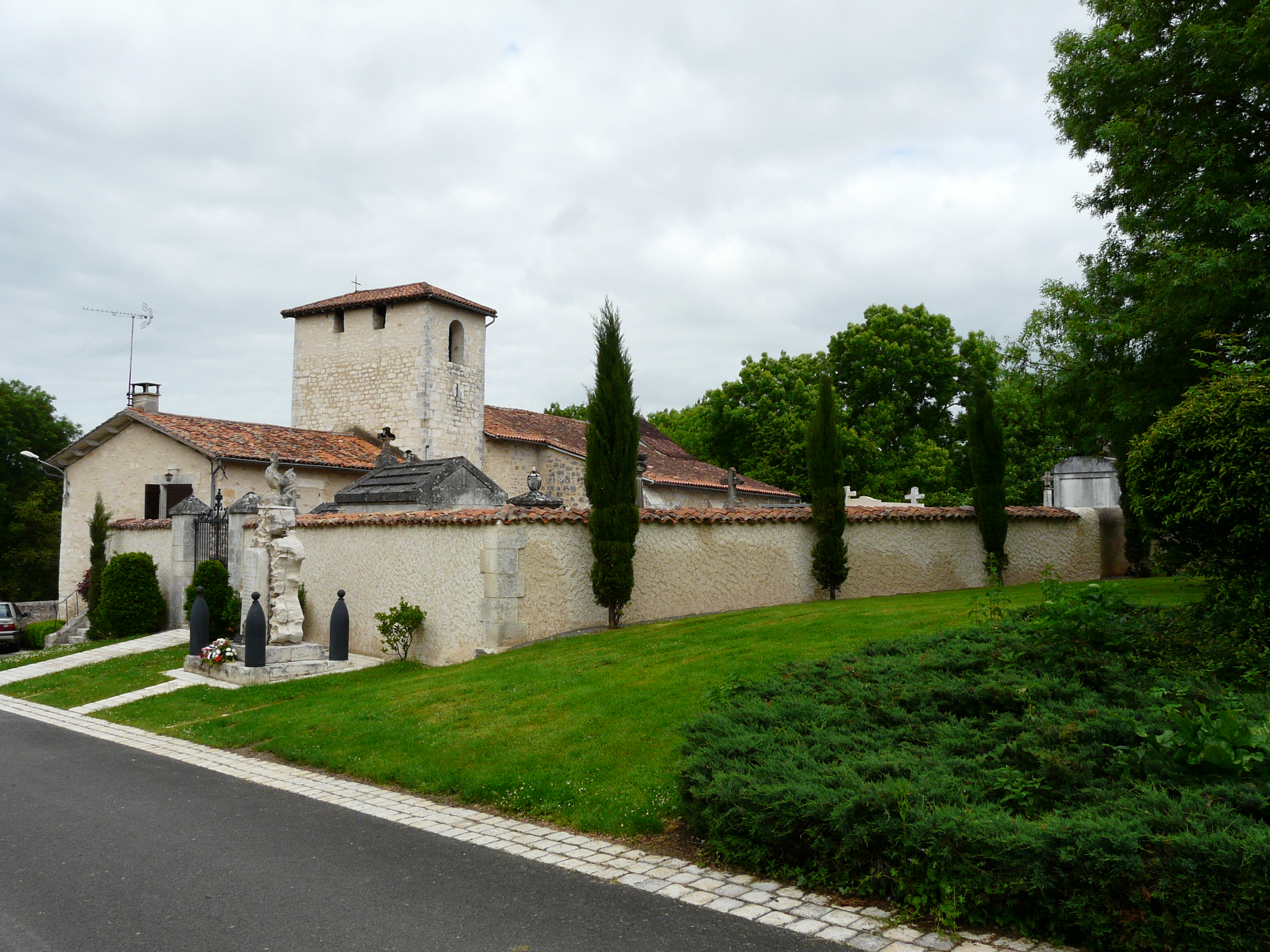
- The church in Souffrignac
- Location of Souffrignac
- Location within France Location within Nouvelle-Aquitaine
- Coordinates: 45°35′36″N 0°30′19″E
- Country: France
- Region: Nouvelle-Aquitaine
- Department: Charente
- Arrondissement: Angoulême
- Canton: Val de Tardoire

Government
  - Mayor (2020–2026): Patrice Jubineau
- Area^{1}: 9.37 km^{2} (3.62 sq mi)
- Elevation: 119 m (390 ft)
- Highest elevation: 178 m (584 ft)
- Lowest elevation: 106 m (348 ft)
- Population (2023): 150
  - Density: 16/km^{2} (41/sq mi)
- Time zone: UTC+01:00 (CET)
  - Summer (DST): UTC+02:00 (CEST)
- INSEE/Postal code: 16372 /16380
- ^{1} French Land Register data, which excludes lakes, ponds, glaciers > 1 km^{2} (0.386 sq mi or 247 acres) and river estuaries.

Souffrignac (French pronunciation: [sufʁiɲak]; Occitan: Sofrinhac) is a commune in the Charente department in southwestern France.

== Population ==
Historical population
Year	Pop.	±% p.a.
1968	182	—
1975	141	−3.58%
1982	148	+0.69%
1990	130	−1.61%
1999	157	+2.12%
2007	126	−2.71%
2012	153	+3.96%
2017	134	−2.62%
2023	150	+1.90%
Source: INSEE

== See also ==
- Communes of the Charente department
