= Mainzac =

- Commune
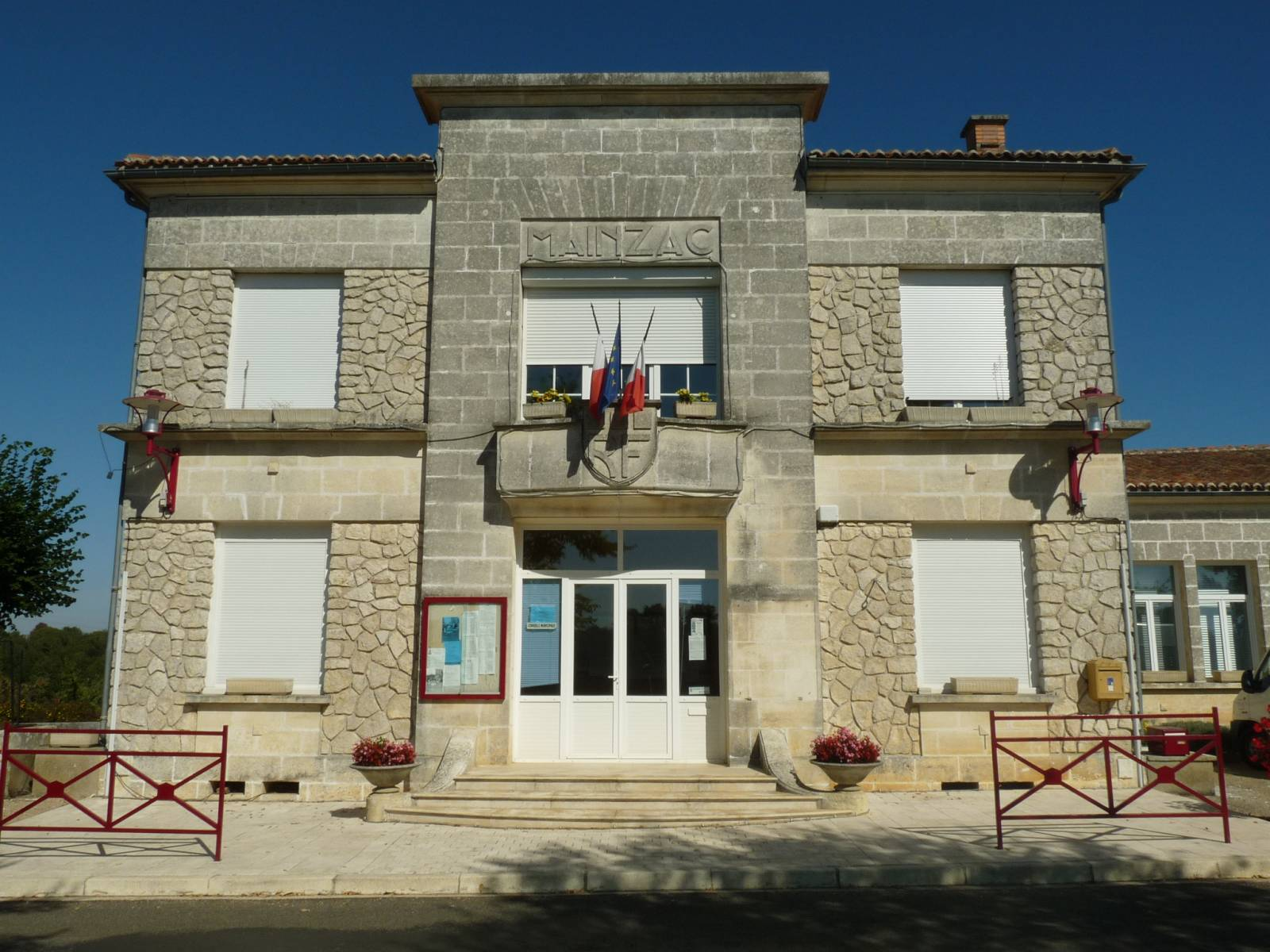
- Town hall
- Location of Mainzac
- Location within France Location within Nouvelle-Aquitaine
- Coordinates: 45°33′10″N 0°29′11″E
- Country: France
- Region: Nouvelle-Aquitaine
- Department: Charente
- Arrondissement: Angoulême
- Canton: Val de Tardoire

Government
  - Mayor (2020–2026): Patrice Dominici
- Area^{1}: 11.29 km^{2} (4.36 sq mi)
- Elevation: 160 m (520 ft)
- Highest elevation: 192 m (630 ft)
- Lowest elevation: 119 m (390 ft)
- Population (2023): 125
  - Density: 11.1/km^{2} (28.7/sq mi)
- Time zone: UTC+01:00 (CET)
  - Summer (DST): UTC+02:00 (CEST)
- INSEE/Postal code: 16203 /16380
- ^{1} French Land Register data, which excludes lakes, ponds, glaciers > 1 km^{2} (0.386 sq mi or 247 acres) and river estuaries.

Mainzac (French pronunciation: [mɛ̃zak]; Occitan: Minzac) is a commune in the Charente department in southwestern France.

== Population ==
Historical population
Year	Pop.	±% p.a.
1968	157	—
1975	121	−3.65%
1982	110	−1.35%
1990	121	+1.20%
1999	102	−1.88%
2007	111	+1.06%
2012	96	−2.86%
2017	110	+2.76%
2023	125	+2.15%
Source: INSEE

== See also ==
- Communes of the Charente department
