= Jean-François Heidenreich =

French executioner (1811–1872)

- Born: 1811
- Died: 1872
- Occupation: Executioner

Jean-François Heidenreich (March 28, 1811 – March 29, 1872) was a French executioner and the first person to hold the position of Chief Executioner of France.

His father, François-Joseph, had himself been an executioner in Chalon-sur-Saône until 1806.

From 1849 until 1871, Hendenreich served as an executioner of Paris and held this job through the Second French Republic, Second French Empire, and Third French Republic. In 1871, he became the first sole executioner of France, as local executioners positions were eliminated. He acted briefly in this capacity until his death.

Government offices
Preceded by Charles-André Férey	Executioner of Paris; 1849 – 1871	Succeeded by Provincial executioners eliminated
Preceded by New title	Chief Executioner of the French Republic; 1871 – 1872	Succeeded by Nicholas Roch
